= Heart discography =

- Studio albums: 16
- Live albums: 9
- Compilation albums: 9
- Singles: 64
- Music videos: 35

The discography of the American rock band Heart consists of 16 studio albums, nine live albums, nine compilation albums, 64 singles and 35 music videos. The group, led by Ann and Nancy Wilson, have sold about 35 million records worldwide.

On the Billboard 200, Heart's self-titled album reached number one in 1985 and was certified quintuple platinum by the Recording Industry Association of America (RIAA). On the Billboard Hot 100 singles chart, the group hit number one twice, with "These Dreams" in 1986 and "Alone" the following year.

== Albums ==
=== Studio albums ===
Title	Album details	Peak chart positions								Certifications
Title	Album details	US	AUS	AUT	CAN	NL	NOR	SWE	UK	Certifications
Dreamboat Annie	Release date: September 1975; Label: Mushroom	7	9	—	20	7	—	—	36	RIAA: Platinum; ARIA: Gold; MC: 2× Platinum
Magazine	Release date: April 19, 1977 / Re-release April 22, 1978; Label: Mushroom	17	66	—	13	9	—	—	—	RIAA: Platinum; MC: 2× Platinum
Little Queen	Release date: May 14, 1977; Label: Portrait/Epic	9	22	—	2	9	—	44	34	RIAA: 3× Platinum; MC: 2× Platinum
Dog and Butterfly	Release date: October 7, 1978; Label: Portrait/Epic	17	48	—	9	46	—	—	—	RIAA: 2× Platinum; MC: Platinum
Bébé le Strange	Release date: February 14, 1980; Label: Epic	5	78	—	24	—	—	—	—	RIAA: Gold; MC: Platinum
Private Audition	Release date: June 5, 1982; Label: Epic	25	—	—	21	—	—	—	77	
Passionworks	Release date: August 20, 1983; Label: Epic	39	—	—	7	—	—	—	—	
Heart	Release date: July 6, 1985; Label: Capitol	1	37	—	3	—	—	22	19	RIAA: 5× Platinum; BPI: Gold; MC: 6× Platinum
Bad Animals	Release date: June 6, 1987; Label: Capitol	2	10	30	3	9	4	5	7	RIAA: 3× Platinum; BPI: Platinum; MC: 4× Platinum
Brigade	Release date: March 25, 1990; Label: Capitol	3	11	7	2	16	7	2	3	RIAA: 2× Platinum; ARIA: Gold; BPI: Gold; MC: 5× Platinum
Desire Walks On	Release date: November 16, 1993; Label: Capitol	48	55	—	36	—	—	24	32	RIAA: Gold; MC: Gold
Heart Presents a Lovemongers' Christmas	Release date: November 20, 2001; Label: Beyond Music	—	—	—	—	—	—	—	—	
Jupiters Darling	Release date: June 22, 2004; Label: Sovereign	94	—	—	—	—	—	—	120	
Red Velvet Car	Release date: August 31, 2010; Label: Legacy	10	—	—	—	—	—	—	196	
Fanatic	Release date: October 2, 2012; Label: Legacy	24	—	—	—	—	—	—	142	
Beautiful Broken	Release date: July 8, 2016; Label: Concord	105	—	—	—	—	—	—	77	
"—" denotes releases that did not chart.

=== Live albums ===
Title	Album details	Chart positions			Certifications (sales threshold)
Title	Album details	US	AUS	UK	Certifications (sales threshold)
Greatest Hits/Live	Release date: November 29, 1980; Label: Epic	13	25	—	RIAA: 2× Platinum
Rock the House Live!	Release date: September 24, 1991; Label: Capitol	107	150	45	
The Road Home	Release date: August 29, 1995; Label: Capitol	87	—	—	RIAA: Gold
Alive in Seattle	Release date: June 10, 2003; Label: Capitol	—	—	—	RIAA: Gold (video longform)
Dreamboat Annie Live	Release date: October 23, 2007; Label: Shout! Factory	—	—	—	
Fanatic Live from Caesar's Colosseum	Release date: February 25, 2014; Label: Frontiers	—	—	—	
Heart & Friends: Home for the Holidays	Release date: November 10, 2014; Label: Frontiers	—	—	—	
Live at the Royal Albert Hall with the Royal Philharmonic Orchestra	Release date: December 2, 2016; Label: Eagle Rock Entertainment	—	—	—	
Live Pittsburgh 1978	Release date: February 23, 2018; Label: The Media Champ	—	—	—	
Live in Atlantic City	Release date: January 25, 2019; Label: earMUSIC	— (Note: Peaked at number 17 on the Billboard Independent Albums chart.)	—	—	
Take The Freedom (Capitol Theatre, New Jersey '79)	Release date: October 19, 2020; Label: Blue Cactus	—	—	—	
"—" denotes releases that did not chart.

=== Compilation albums ===
Title	Album details	Chart positions			Certifications (sales threshold)
Title	Album details	US	NOR	UK	Certifications (sales threshold)
Ballads: The Greatest Hits	Release date: July 3, 1996; Label: Toshiba/EMI Japan	—	—	—	
These Dreams: Greatest Hits	Release date: March 11, 1997; Label: Capitol	131	—	33	
Greatest Hits	Release date: August 25, 1998; Label: Epic/Legacy	—	—	—	
Greatest Hits: 1985–1995	Release date: June 27, 2000; Label: Capitol	—	3	—	RIAA: Gold; BPI: Gold
The Essential Heart	Release date: November 26, 2002; Label: Legacy	—	—	—	RIAA: Platinum
Love Alive	Release date: September 27, 2005; Label: Sony BMG	—	—	—	
Love Songs	Release date: January 10, 2006; Label: Sony BMG	—	—	—	
Playlist: The Very Best of Heart	Release date: July 8, 2008; Label: Legacy	—	—	—	
Strange Euphoria	Release date: June 5, 2012; Label: Sony Legacy	—	—	—	
Icon	Release date: May 14, 2013; Label: Capitol	—	—	—	
"—" denotes releases that did not chart.

== Singles ==
Title	Year	Peak chart positions								Certifications	Album
Title	Year	US	US CB	US Rock	US AC	AUS	CAN	NL	UK	Certifications	Album
"How Deep It Goes"	1975	—	—	x	—	—	—	—	—		Dreamboat Annie
"Magic Man"	1975	9	7	x	—	6	26	8	—		Dreamboat Annie
"Crazy on You"	1976	35	40	x	—	70	25	4	—		Dreamboat Annie
"Dreamboat Annie"	1976	42	32	x	17	—	53	—	—		Dreamboat Annie
"(Love Me Like Music) I'll Be Your Song"	1977	—	—	x	—	—	—	—	—		Dreamboat Annie
"Barracuda"	1977	11	10	x	—	15	2	29	—	BPI: Gold	Little Queen
"Little Queen"	1977	62	48	x	—	—	58	—	—		Little Queen
"Kick It Out"	1977	79	69	x	—	—	67	—	—		Little Queen
"Crazy on You" (re-entry)	1978	62	69	x	—	—	68	—	—		Dreamboat Annie
"Heartless"	1978	24	18	x	—	—	18	—	—		Magazine
"Without You"	1978	—	—	x	—	—	—	—	—		Magazine
"Magazine"	1978	—	—	x	—	—	—	—	—		Magazine
"Straight On"	1978	15	18	x	—	—	14	—	—		Dog & Butterfly
"Dog & Butterfly"	1979	34	31	x	33	—	51	—	—		Dog & Butterfly
"Even It Up"	1980	33	30	x	—	—	56	—	—		Bebe le Strange
"Bebe le Strange"	1980	109	—	x	—	—	—	—	—		Bebe le Strange
"Raised on You"	1980	—	—	x	—	—	—	—	—		Bebe le Strange
"Tell It Like It Is"	1980	8	14	x	43	51	4	—	—		Greatest Hits/Live
"Unchained Melody" (live)	1981	83	—	x	—	—	—	—	—		Greatest Hits/Live
"This Man Is Mine"	1982	33	29	16	—	—	—	—	—		Private Audition
"City's Burning" (airplay)	1982	—	—	15	—	—	—	—	—		Private Audition
"Bright Light Girl"	1982	—	—	—	—	—	—	—	—		Private Audition
"How Can I Refuse?"	1983	44	56	1	—	—	—	—	—		Passionworks
"Sleep Alone" (airplay)	1983	—	—	43	—	—	—	—	—		Passionworks
"Allies"	1983	83	—	—	—	—	—	—	—		Passionworks
"The Heat" (airplay)	1984	—	—	40	—	—	—	—	—		Up the Creek (soundtrack)
"What About Love"	1985	10	17	3	—	28	8	—	14		Heart
"Never"	1985	4	6	2	—	48	13	—	8		Heart
"These Dreams"	1986	1	1	2	1	27	6	38	8		Heart
"Nothin' at All"	1986	10	11	6	40	87	29	—	38		Heart
"If Looks Could Kill"	1986	54	60	—	—	—	—	—	—		Heart
"Alone"	1987	1	1	3	2	6	1	6	3	BPI: Platinum	Bad Animals
"Who Will You Run To"	1987	7	6	2	—	63	19	—	30		Bad Animals
"There's the Girl"	1987	12	19	16	—	—	31	—	34		Bad Animals
"I Want You So Bad"	1988	49	55	—	—	—	88	—	—		Bad Animals
"All I Wanna Do Is Make Love to You"	1990	2	1	2	6	1	1	4	8	RIAA: Gold; ARIA: Platinum; BPI: Silver; MC: Gold; RMNZ: Platinum	Brigade
"Wild Child" (airplay)	1990	—	—	3	—	—	—	—	—		Brigade
"Tall, Dark Handsome Stranger" (airplay)	1990	—	—	24	—	—	—	—	—		Brigade
"I Didn't Want to Need You"	1990	23	21	13	—	64	14	60	47		Brigade
"Stranded"	1990	13	11	25	8	120	2	—	60		Brigade
"Secret"	1991	64	41	—	—	—	30	—	79		Brigade
"You're the Voice" (live)	1991	—	104	20	—	—	65	—	56		Rock the House Live!
"Black on Black II" (airplay)	1993	—	—	4	—	138	59	—	—		Desire Walks On
"Will You Be There (In the Morning)"	1993	39	41	—	15	24	8	—	19		Desire Walks On
"Back to Avalon" (radio promo single)	1994	—	—	—	—	—	60	—	—		Desire Walks On
"The Woman in Me"	1994	105	—	—	24	—	13	—	—		Desire Walks On
"Crazy on You" (live EP)	1995	—	—	—	—	—	—	—	—		The Road Home
"The Road Home" (live)	1995	—	—	—	—	—	47	—	—		The Road Home
"Strong, Strong Wind"	1998	—	—	—	—	—	—	—	—		Greatest Hits
"The Perfect Goodbye"	2004	—	—	—	—	—	—	—	—		Jupiters Darling
"Oldest Story in the World"	2004	—	—	22	—	—	—	—	—		Jupiters Darling
"Make Me"	2004	—	—	—	—	—	—	—	—		Jupiters Darling
"Hey You"	2010	—	—	—	26	—	—	—	—		Red Velvet Car
"WTF"	2010	—	—	—	—	—	—	—	—		Red Velvet Car
"Walking Good" (with Sarah McLachlan)	2012	—	—	—	—	—	—	—	—		Fanatic
"Fanatic"	2012	—	—	—	—	—	—	—	—		Fanatic
"Dear Old America"	2013	—	—	—	—	—	—	—	—		Fanatic
"Stairway to Heaven" (Live at the Kennedy Center Honors)	2013	—	—	29	—	—	—	—	—		Non-album singles
"Please Come Home for Christmas" (with Aaron Neville)/ "All Through the Night" (with Richard Marx)	2013	—	—	—	16	—	—	—	—		Non-album singles
"Beautiful Broken" (with James Hetfield)	2016	—	—	—	—	—	—	—	—		Beautiful Broken
"—" denotes releases that failed to chart or not released to that country. "x" denotes the chart did not exist at the time.

== Other appearances ==
Year	Song(s)	Album	Notes
2014	"Band on the Run" and "Letting Go"	The Art of McCartney	Wings cover

== Music videos, VHS and DVD releases ==
- 1977: "Love Alive"
- 1977: "Little Queen"
- 1977: "Barracuda"
- 1980: "Even It Up"
- 1980: "Break"
- 1980: "Tell It Like It Is"
- 1982: "This Man Is Mine"
- 1982: "City's Burning"
- 1982: "The Situation"
- 1983: "How Can I Refuse"
- 1983: "Allies"
- 1985: "What About Love"
- 1985: "Never"
- 1986: "These Dreams"
- 1986: "Nothin' at All"
- 1987: "Alone"
- 1987: "Who Will You Run To"
- 1988: "There's the Girl"
- 1990: "All I Wanna Do Is Make Love to You"
- 1990: "I Didn't Want to Need You"
- 1990: "Stranded"
- 1991: "Secret"
- 1991: "You're the Voice"
- 1993: "Will You Be There (In the Morning)"
- 2003: "Alive in Seattle" (DVD/Blu-ray)
- 2010: "WTF"
- 2012: "Fanatic"
- 2012: "Dear Old America"
- 2016: Live at the Royal Albert Hall with the Royal Philharmonic Orchestra (DVD)
- 2019: Live in Atlantic City (DVD/Blu-ray)

"What About Love", "Never", "These Dreams", "Nothin' at All", "Alone", "Who Will You Run To" and "There's the Girl" were released on VHS in 1988 under the title If Looks Could Kill.

A video version of The Road Home has been issued on both VHS (1995) and DVD (2003).

== Lovemongers releases ==
Ann & Nancy Wilson have also recorded albums under the moniker Lovemongers, an informal acoustic music side-project with long-time Heart contributing writer Sue Ennis as a fellow band member. Their second full-length album was later re-released presented by Heart.

Year	Title	Notes
1992	Battle of Evermore	live EP; cover songs
1997	Whirlygig	debut album
1998	Here is Christmas	later re-released, in 2001, as Heart Presents A Lovemongers' Christmas
