= List of Heart band members =

List of current and former Heart members

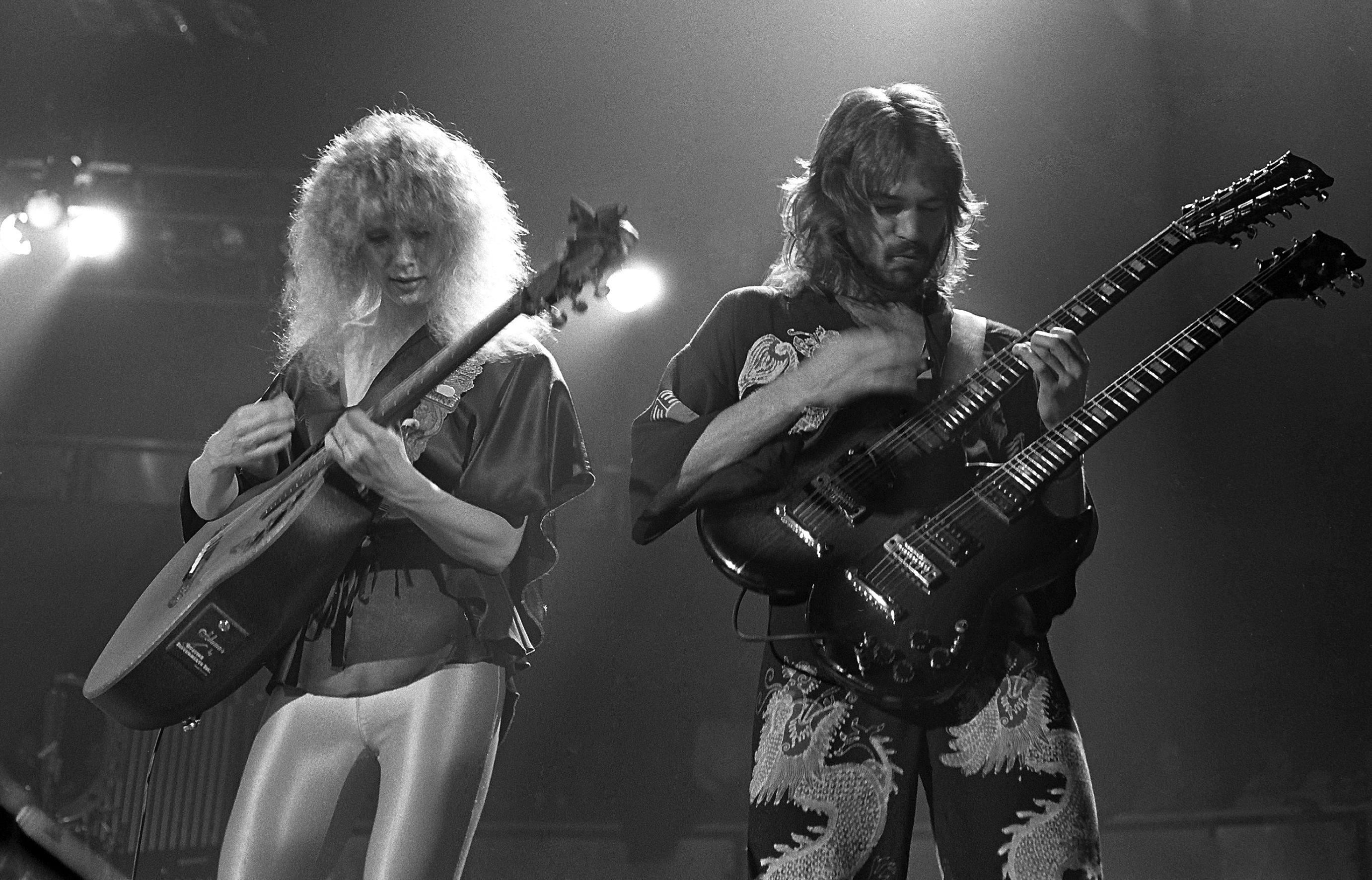
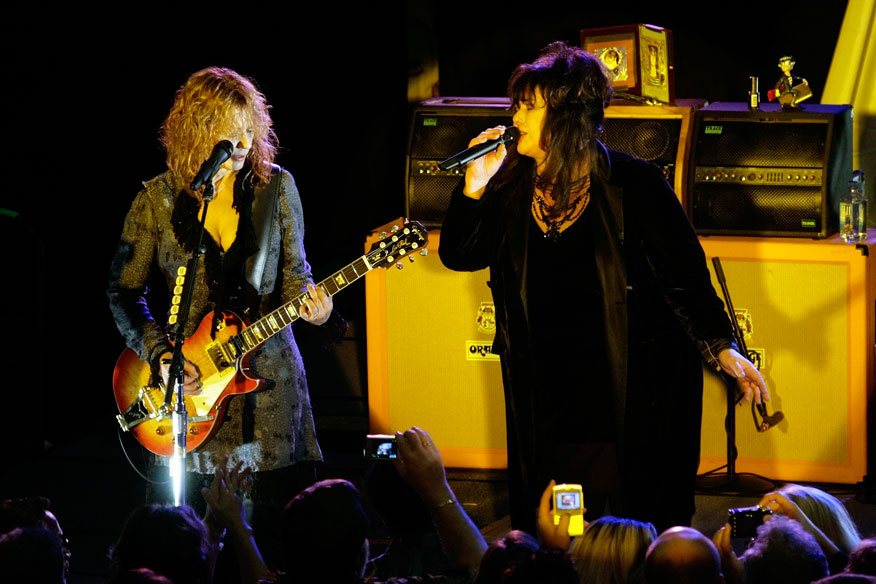
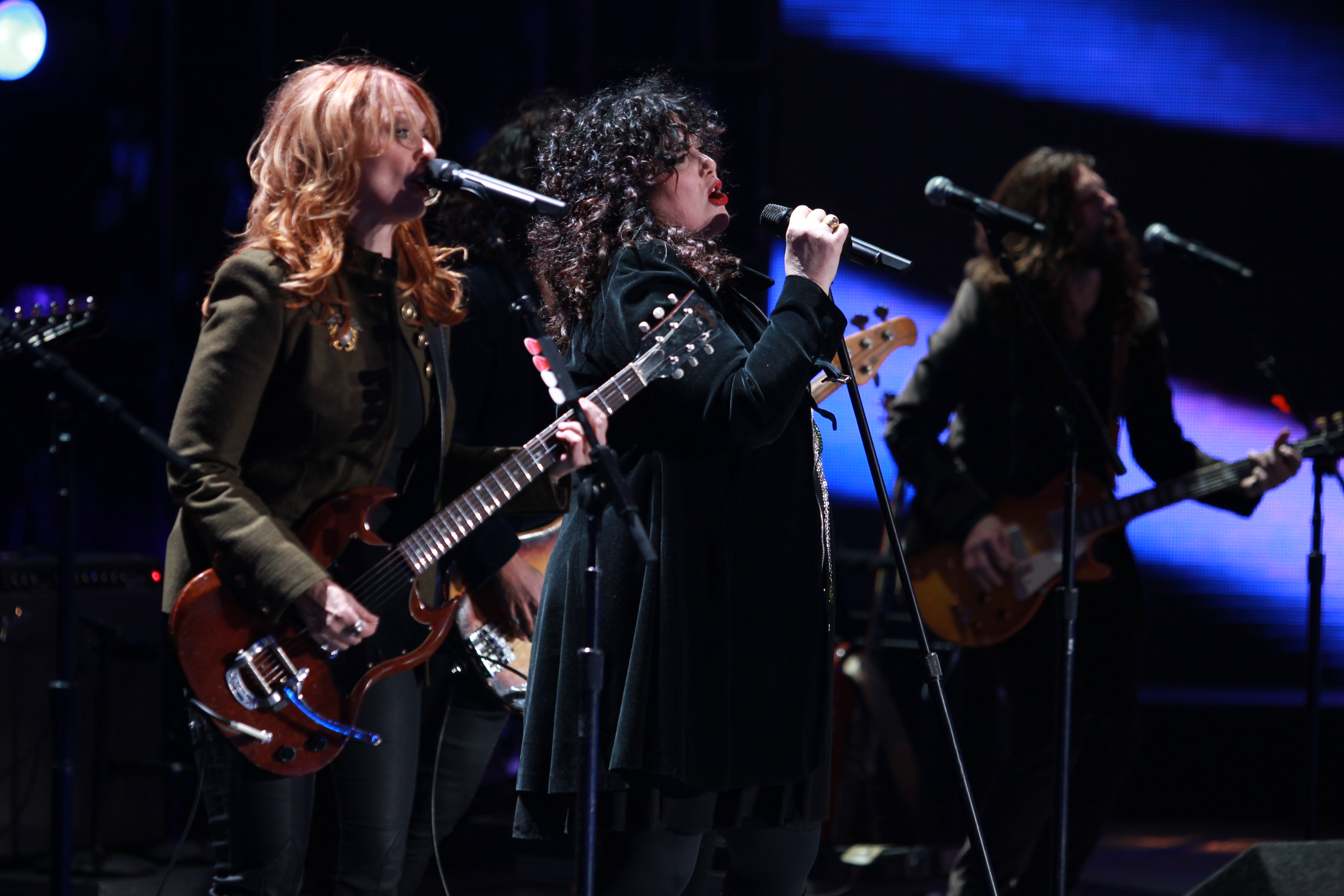
Members of Heart performing live in 1978 (top), 2007 (middle) and 2010 (bottom)

Heart is an American rock band from Seattle, Washington. Formed in 1967, the group later consisted of vocalist Ann Wilson, guitarist Roger Fisher, bassist Steve Fossen, drummer Brian Johnstone and keyboardist John Hannah. Shortly after the group's formation, Wilson's younger sister Nancy joined as rhythm guitarist, Johnstone was replaced by Michael Derosier and Hannah by Howard Leese. The band's current lineup includes the Wilson sisters, guitarists Ryan Waters (since 2019) and Ryan Wariner, keyboardist/guitarist Paul Moak, bassist Tony Lucido and drummer Sean T. Lane (all since 2023).

== History ==
=== 1967–1995 ===
Heart formed in 1967 as the Army, which featured guitarist Roger Fisher, bassist Steve Fossen and drummer Mike Fisher (Roger's brother). The group went through a number of lineup changes in its early years, as well as changing its name to White Heart (also sometimes credited simply as Heart) and later Hocus Pocus. Once it had settled on the name Heart in 1973, the band included Roger Fisher and Fossen, vocalist Ann Wilson (who became romantically involved with Mike Fisher), drummer Brian Johnstone and keyboardist John Hannah. Wilson's younger sister Nancy joined as rhythm guitarist the following year (and became romantically involved with Roger Fisher), while Hannah and Johnstone were replaced by Howard Leese and Michael Derosier, respectively, upon the band's signing with Mushroom Records in 1975.

After the release of the band's first four albums, Roger Fisher was fired from Heart in October 1979 due to increased tensions within the group, stemming from his lifestyle and breakup with Nancy Wilson. Leese took over the role of the band's lead guitarist, as they remained a five-piece. Fossen and Derosier also left after the recording of 1982's Private Audition, with Mark Andes and Denny Carmassi taking their respective positions. Both members remained with the band until the early 1990s; Andes left in 1992, prior to recording for the following year's Desire Walks On, before Carmassi followed the next year, after performing on said album. Following the album's release, the departed Andes and Carmassi were replaced by Fernando Saunders and Denny Fongheiser, respectively.

=== 1995–2019 ===
Heart spent several years in the late 1990s on temporary hiatus as the Wilson sisters worked on other projects, including together in new group the Lovemongers. The band toured occasionally without Nancy Wilson, adding lead guitarist Frank Cox, rhythm guitarist Scott Olson, bassist Jon Bayless and drummer Ben Smith. After a tour in 1998, long-time guitarist and keyboardist Leese left the band, later joining the solo band of Paul Rodgers. Ann and Nancy Wilson began touring in 1999 for the first time without a backing band. In 2002, a new lineup of Heart was introduced featuring returning members Olson and Smith, as well as new bassist Mike Inez and keyboardist Tom Kellock. The following year, Olson and Kellock were replaced in the Heart touring lineup by Gilby Clarke and Darian Sahanaja, respectively.

Sahanaja remained for Heart's first studio album in eleven years, Jupiters Darling, which also featured Clarke's replacement Craig Bartock. Debbie Shair replaced Sahanaja after the album's release. Ric Markmann became Heart's new bassist in 2005, after Inez's former band Alice in Chains reformed. Markmann left the touring lineup in 2009, introducing the band to his eventual replacement Kristian Attard, although he would later work with the band in the studio for Red Velvet Car and Fanatic. Dan Rothchild took over on bass in 2012. Chris Joyner replaced Shair in 2014. During late 2016, 2017 and 2018, Heart was on hiatus after an incident in which Ann Wilson's husband Dean Wetter was arrested for assaulting Nancy Wilson's children outside the venue in which the sisters were performing.

=== 2019 onwards ===
In February 2019, it was announced that Heart had reformed for a new concert tour. The lineup for the tour included long-time guitarist Craig Bartock and former drummer Denny Fongheiser, plus new members Ryan Waters on guitar, Andy Stoller on bass and keyboardist Dan Walker.

In November 2023, it was announced that the band would reform Heart for a few shows in December. The show included the Wilsons, former guitarist Ryan Waters, and members of Ann's band Tripsitter, which includes guitarist Ryan Wariner, keyboardist/guitarist Paul Moak, bassist Tony Lucido and drummer Sean T. Lane.

== Members ==
=== Current ===
Image	Name	Years active	Instruments	Release contributions
	Ann Wilson	1971–2016; 2019; 2023–present	lead and backing vocals; flute; acoustic guitar; autoharp; occasional piano and bass	all Heart releases
	Nancy Wilson	1974–1995; 1998–2016; 2019; 2023–present	lead and rhythm guitar; mandolin; harmonica; keyboards; autoharp; backing and lead vocals	all Heart releases
	Ryan Waters	2019; 2023–present	lead and rhythm guitars; backing vocals	none to date
	Ryan Wariner	2023–present	lead and rhythm guitars; backing vocals	none to date
	Paul Moak	2023–present	keyboards; rhythm and lead guitar; backing vocals	none to date
	Tony Lucido	2023–present	bass	none to date
	Sean T. Lane	2023–present	drums	none to date

=== Former ===
Image	Name	Years active	Instruments	Release contributions
	Steve Fossen	1967–1982	bass; backing vocals; occasional percussion	all Heart releases from Dreamboat Annie (1975) to Private Audition (1982)
	Roger Fisher	1967–1979	lead and rhythm guitars; lap steel guitar; mandolin	all Heart releases from Dreamboat Annie (1975) to Dog & Butterfly (1978)
	Gary Ziegelman	1967–1971	lead vocals	none
	James Cirrello	1967–1971	rhythm guitar	none
	Ron Rudge	1967–1971	drums	none
	Ken Hansen	1967–1971	percussion	none
	David Belzer	1971	keyboards	none
	Jeff Johnson	1971	drums	none
	Gary Humphries	1971–1972	lead vocals	none
	Don Wilhelm	1971–1972	keyboards	none
	Chris Blaine	1971–1972	drums	none
	John Hannah	1972–1975	keyboards	none
	Brian Johnstone	1972–1975	drums	none
	Howard Leese	1975–1998	keyboards; lead and rhythm guitars; mandolin; percussion; accordion; backing vocals; bass (1992)	all Heart releases from Dreamboat Annie (1975) to The Road Home (1995)
	Michael Derosier	1975–1982	drums; percussion	all Heart releases from Dreamboat Annie (1975) to Private Audition (1982)
	Denny Carmassi	1982–1993	drums; percussion	all Heart releases from Passionworks (1983) to Desire Walks On (1993)
	Mark Andes	1982–1993	bass; backing vocals; occasional acoustic guitar	all Heart releases from Passionworks (1983) to Rock the House Live! (1991)
	Denny Fongheiser	1993–1995; 2019	drums; percussion	The Road Home (1995)
	Fernando Saunders	1993–1995	bass; backing vocals	The Road Home (1995)
	Frank Cox	1995–1999	lead and rhythm guitar; backing vocals	"Strong, Strong Wind" (1998)
	Scott Olson	1995–1998; 2002–2003	lead and rhythm guitar; lap steel guitar; backing vocals	Alive in Seattle (2003)
	Ben Smith	1995–1998; 2002–2016	drums; percussion	all Heart releases from Alive in Seattle (2003) to Live in Atlantic City (2019)
	Jon Bayless	1995–1998	bass	none
	Mike Inez	2002–2005	bass; occasional percussion	Alive in Seattle (2003); Jupiters Darling (2004); Live in Atlantic City (2019)
	Tom Kellock	2002–2003	keyboards	Alive in Seattle (2003)
	Darian Sahanaja	2003–2004; 2007	keyboards; percussion; backing vocals	Jupiters Darling (2004); Dreamboat Annie Live (2007)
	Gilby Clarke	2003	lead and rhythm guitars; backing vocals	none
	Craig Bartock	2003–2016; 2019	lead and rhythm guitars; backing vocals	all Heart releases from Jupiters Darling (2004) onwards, except Red Velvet Car (2010) and Fanatic (2012)
	Debbie Shair	2004–2014	keyboards; percussion; accordion; backing vocals	Dreamboat Annie Live (2007); Night at Sky Church (2010); Fanatic Live from Caesar's Colosseum (2014); Home for the Holidays (2014); Live in Atlantic City (2019)
	Ric Markmann	2005–2009	bass	Dreamboat Annie Live (2007); Red Velvet Car (2010); Fanatic (2012)
	Kristian Attard	2009–2012	bass	Night at Sky Church (2010)
	Dan Rothchild	2012–2016	bass; backing vocals	all Heart releases from Fanatic Live from Caesar's Colosseum (2014) to Live at the Royal Albert Hall (2016)
	Chris Joyner	2014–2016	keyboards; rhythm guitar	Beautiful Broken (2016); Live at the Royal Albert Hall (2016)
	Andy Stoller	2019	bass; backing vocals	none
	Dan Walker	2019	keyboards; accordion; backing vocals	none

== Lineups ==
Period	Members	Releases
Early 1973 – mid-1974	Ann Wilson – lead vocals, flute; Roger Fisher – guitar; Steve Fossen – bass, percussion, backing vocals; Brian Johnstone – drums; John Hannah – keyboards	none
Mid-1974 – early 1975	Ann Wilson – vocals, flute; Nancy Wilson – rhythm guitar, harmonica, vocals; Roger Fisher – lead guitar; Steve Fossen – bass, percussion, backing vocals; Brian Johnstone – drums; John Hannah – keyboards	none
Summer 1975 – October 1979	Ann Wilson – vocals, flute, rhythm guitar, piano; Nancy Wilson – rhythm and lead guitar, harmonica, vocals; Roger Fisher – lead guitar; Steve Fossen – bass, percussion, backing vocals; Michael Derosier – drums, percussion; Howard Leese – keyboards, lead and rhythm guitar, backing vocals	Dreamboat Annie (1975); Little Queen (1977); Magazine (1977); Dog & Butterfly (1978)
October 1979 – early 1982	Ann Wilson – vocals, flute, rhythm guitar, piano; Nancy Wilson – lead and rhythm guitar, harmonica, vocals; Howard Leese – lead and rhythm guitar, keyboards, backing vocals; Steve Fossen – bass, percussion, backing vocals; Michael Derosier – drums, percussion	Bébé le Strange (1980); Greatest Hits/Live (1980); Private Audition (1982)
1982–1992	Ann Wilson – vocals, flute, rhythm guitar, piano; Nancy Wilson – lead and rhythm guitar, harmonica, vocals; Howard Leese – lead and rhythm guitar, keyboards, backing vocals; Mark Andes – bass, backing vocals; Denny Carmassi – drums, percussion	Passionworks (1983); Heart (1985); Bad Animals (1987); Brigade (1990); Rock the House Live! (1991)
1992–1993	Ann Wilson – vocals, flute, rhythm guitar, piano; Nancy Wilson – lead and rhythm guitar, harmonica, vocals; Howard Leese – lead and rhythm guitar, keyboards, backing vocals, bass; Denny Carmassi – drums, percussion	Desire Walks On (1993)
1993–1995	Ann Wilson – vocals, flute, rhythm guitar, piano; Nancy Wilson – lead and rhythm guitar, harmonica, vocals; Howard Leese – lead and rhythm guitar, keyboards, backing vocals; Fernando Saunders – bass, backing vocals; Denny Fongheiser – drums, percussion	The Road Home (1995)
1995–1998	Ann Wilson – lead vocals, flute, piano; Frank Cox – lead guitar, backing vocals; Scott Olson – rhythm guitar, backing vocals; Jon Bayless – bass; Ben Smith – drums, percussion; Howard Leese – keyboards, rhythm and lead guitar, backing vocals	none
1998	Ann Wilson – vocals, flute, rhythm guitar, piano; Nancy Wilson – lead and rhythm guitar, harmonica, vocals; Frank Cox – lead and rhythm guitar, backing vocals	"Strong, Strong Wind" (1998)
1999–2002	Ann Wilson – vocals, flute, rhythm guitar, piano; Nancy Wilson – lead and rhythm guitar, harmonica, vocals	none
April 2002 – March 2003	Ann Wilson – vocals, flute, rhythm guitar, piano; Nancy Wilson – lead and rhythm guitar, harmonica, vocals; Scott Olson – lead and rhythm guitar, backing vocals; Mike Inez – bass, percussion; Ben Smith – drums, percussion; Tom Kellock – keyboards	Alive in Seattle (2003)
March – August 2003	Ann Wilson – vocals, flute, rhythm guitar, piano; Nancy Wilson – lead and rhythm guitar, harmonica, vocals; Gilby Clarke – lead and rhythm guitar, backing vocals; Mike Inez – bass, percussion; Ben Smith – drums, percussion; Darian Sahanaja – keyboards, percussion, backing vocals	none
2003–2004	Ann Wilson – vocals, flute, rhythm guitar, piano; Nancy Wilson – lead and rhythm guitar, harmonica, vocals; Craig Bartock – lead and rhythm guitar, backing vocals; Mike Inez – bass, percussion; Ben Smith – drums, percussion; Darian Sahanaja – keyboards, percussion, backing vocals	Jupiters Darling (2004)
2004–2005	Ann Wilson – vocals, flute, rhythm guitar, piano; Nancy Wilson – lead and rhythm guitar, harmonica, vocals; Craig Bartock – lead and rhythm guitar, backing vocals; Mike Inez – bass, percussion; Ben Smith – drums, percussion; Debbie Shair – keyboards, percussion, backing vocals	Live in Atlantic City (2019)
2005–2009	Ann Wilson – vocals, flute, rhythm guitar, piano; Nancy Wilson – lead and rhythm guitar, harmonica, vocals; Craig Bartock – lead and rhythm guitar, backing vocals; Ric Markmann – bass; Ben Smith – drums, percussion; Debbie Shair – keyboards, percussion, backing vocals	Dreamboat Annie Live (2007); Red Velvet Car (2010) (does not feature Bartock or Shair); Fanatic (2012) (does not feature Bartock or Shair)
2009–2012	Ann Wilson – vocals, flute, rhythm guitar, piano; Nancy Wilson – lead and rhythm guitar, harmonica, vocals; Craig Bartock – lead and rhythm guitar, backing vocals; Kristian Attard – bass; Ben Smith – drums, percussion; Debbie Shair – keyboards, percussion, backing vocals	Night at Sky Church (2010)
2012–2014	Ann Wilson – vocals, flute, rhythm guitar, piano; Nancy Wilson – lead and rhythm guitar, harmonica, vocals; Craig Bartock – lead and rhythm guitar, backing vocals; Dan Rotchild – bass, backing vocals; Ben Smith – drums, percussion; Debbie Shair – keyboards, percussion, backing vocals	Fanatic Live from Caesars Colosseum (2014); Home for the Holidays (2014)
2014–2019	Ann Wilson – vocals, flute, piano; Nancy Wilson – lead and rhythm guitar, harmonica, vocals; Craig Bartock – lead and rhythm guitar, backing vocals; Dan Rotchild – bass, backing vocals; Ben Smith – drums, percussion; Chris Joyner – keyboards, rhythm guitar	Beautiful Broken (2016); Live at the Royal Albert Hall (2016)
February – August 2019	Ann Wilson – vocals, flute, rhythm guitar, piano; Nancy Wilson – lead and rhythm guitar, harmonica, vocals; Craig Bartock – lead and rhythm guitar, backing vocals; Ryan Waters – lead and rhythm guitar, backing vocals; Andy Stoller – bass, backing vocals; Denny Fongheiser – drums, percussion; Dan Walker – keyboards, backing vocals	none
December 2023 – present	Ann Wilson – vocals, flute, rhythm guitar; Nancy Wilson – lead and rhythm guitar, harmonica, vocals; Ryan Wariner – lead and rhythm guitar, backing vocals; Ryan Waters – lead and rhythm guitar, backing vocals; Paul Moak – keyboards, rhythm and lead guitar, backing vocals; Tony Lucido – bass; Sean T. Lane – drums	none
