= These Dreams: Greatest Hits =

Greatest hits album by Heart
- Released: March 11, 1997
- Recorded: 1975–1995
- Genre: Hard rock, power pop, pop rock, folk rock
- Length: 73:31
- Label: Capitol
- Producer: Mike Flicker, Ron Nevison, Keith Olsen, Richie Zito

Heart chronology
The Road Home (1995)	These Dreams: Greatest Hits (1997)	Greatest Hits (1998)

Professional ratings
Review scores
Source	Rating
Allmusic	4/5 stars

These Dreams: Greatest Hits is a compilation album by the American rock band Heart.

The track list spans the band's history from 1975 through 1995, though Capitol Records did not have the licensing to some of Heart's earlier work as it had been issued on other labels. Therefore, some of Heart's earlier singles are presented in alternate live acoustic versions, as featured on the 1995 release The Road Home.

== Track listing ==
No.	Title	Writer(s)	Original album	Length
1.	"Crazy on You"	Ann Wilson, Nancy Wilson	Dreamboat Annie (1975)	4:51
2.	"All I Wanna Do Is Make Love to You"	Robert John "Mutt" Lange	Brigade (1990)	5:07
3.	"If Looks Could Kill"	Jack Conrad, Bob Garrett	Heart (1985)	3:41
4.	"Never"	A. Wilson, N. Wilson, Greg Bloch, Holly Knight	Heart	4:04
5.	"Alone"	Tom Kelly, Billy Steinberg	Bad Animals (1987)	3:38
6.	"Who Will You Run To"	Diane Warren	Bad Animals	4:04
7.	"Straight On" (live acoustic)	A. Wilson, N. Wilson, Sue Ennis	The Road Home (1995)	4:48
8.	"Magic Man"	A. Wilson, N. Wilson	Dreamboat Annie	5:28
9.	"What About Love"	Brian Allen, Sheron Alton, Jim Vallance	Heart	3:39
10.	"Dreamboat Annie"	A. Wilson, N. Wilson	Dreamboat Annie	2:04
11.	"Dog and Butterfly" (live acoustic)	A. Wilson, N. Wilson, Ennis	The Road Home	6:03
12.	"Nothin' at All"	Mark Mueller	Heart	4:08
13.	"Heartless"	A. Wilson, N. Wilson	Magazine (1977)	5:00
14.	"Stranded"	Jaime Kyle, Jeff Harrington	Brigade	3:54
15.	"Will You Be There (In the Morning)"	Lange	Desire Walks On (1993)	4:25
16.	"These Dreams"	Martin Page, Bernie Taupin	Heart	4:12
17.	"Barracuda" (live)	A. Wilson, N. Wilson, Roger Fisher, Michael DeRosier	Rock the House Live! (1991)	4:25
