= The Essential Heart =

Greatest hits album by Heart
- Released: November 26, 2002
- Recorded: 1975–1995
- Genre: Hard rock; folk rock; power pop; pop rock
- Length: 157:44
- Label: Sony Music; Epic; Capitol; Legacy
- Producer: Mike Flicker; Ron Nevison; Keith Olsen; Richie Zito; Duane Baron; John Purdell; John Paul Jones; Heart

Heart chronology
| Heart Presents a Lovemongers' Christmas (2001) | The Essential Heart (2002) | Alive in Seattle (2003) |

Professional ratings
Review scores
| Source | Rating |
|---|---|
| AllMusic | 4.5/5 stars |
| Uncut | 4/10 stars |
| The Music Box | 3/5 stars |
| Sputnikmusic | 3/5 stars |

The Essential Heart is a compilation album released by the American rock band Heart in 2002, part of Sony BMG's The Essential series. The collection spans the band's history from 1975 through 1995. In 2008, the album was re-released as The Essential Heart 3.0, a three-disc limited edition with an added third disc of songs. In June 2011 the album was certified Platinum by the RIAA.

== Track listing ==
=== Disc 1 ===
1. "Crazy on You" – 4:54
2. "Magic Man" – 5:30
3. "Dreamboat Annie (Reprise)" – 3:49
4. "Barracuda" – 4:23
5. "Little Queen" – 5:13
6. "Kick It Out" – 2:46
7. "Love Alive" – 4:25
8. "Heartless" – 5:00
9. "Straight On" – 5:06
10. "Dog & Butterfly" – 5:21
11. "Silver Wheels" – 1:25
12. "Even It Up" – 5:12
13. "Rock and Roll (Live)" – 5:57
14. "Tell It Like It Is" (Edit) – 3:55
15. "Unchained Melody (Live)" – 4:32
16. "This Man Is Mine" – 3:06
17. "How Can I Refuse?" – 3:54
18. "Allies" – 4:41

=== Disc 2 ===
1. "What About Love" – 3:41
2. "Never" (Original Version) – 4:04
3. "These Dreams" – 4:14
4. "Nothin' at All" (Original Version) – 4:13
5. "If Looks Could Kill" – 3:43
6. "Alone" – 3:40
7. "Who Will You Run To" – 4:06
8. "There's the Girl" – 3:51
9. "I Want You So Bad" – 4:19
10. "All I Wanna Do Is Make Love to You" – 5:07
11. "Wild Child" – 4:29 (Romeo's Daughter cover)
12. "I Didn't Want to Need You" – 4:07
13. "Stranded" – 3:56
14. "Secret" – 4:14
15. "You're the Voice" (live) – 5:07
16. "Will You Be There (In the Morning)" – 4:28
17. "Black on Black II" – 3:53
18. "Ring Them Bells" featuring Layne Staley (of Alice in Chains) – 3:51
19. "The Road Home" (live) (edit) – 3:34

=== Disc 3 [Limited Edition 3.0 version only] ===
1. "Sylvan Song" - 2:12
2. "Dream of the Archer" - 4:31
3. "Bebe le Strange" - 3:40
4. "Mistral Wind" (live) - 7:15
5. "Hit Single" - 2:35
6. "Strange Euphoria" - 2:45
7. "City's Burning" - 4:25
8. "Strong, Strong Wind" - 4:28

== Charts ==
| Chart (2002) | Peak position |
|---|---|
| NZ Recorded Music NZ | 15 |
