= Greatest Hits: 1985–1995 =

2000 greatest hits album by Heart

Greatest hits album by Heart
- Released: June 27, 2000
- Recorded: 1985–1995
- Genre: Hard rock, power pop, pop rock
- Length: 73:04
- Label: Capitol
- Producer: Ron Nevison, Richie Zito, Duane Baron, John Purdell, John Paul Jones

Heart chronology
Greatest Hits (1998)	Greatest Hits: 1985–1995 (2000)	Heart Presents a Lovemongers' Christmas (2001)

Professional ratings
Review scores
Source	Rating
Allmusic	4/5 stars
The Rolling Stone Album Guide	4/5 stars

Greatest Hits: 1985–1995, released in Europe as simply Greatest Hits, is a compilation album by the American rock band Heart. This compilation is a companion to the 1998 Epic Records release Greatest Hits (1976–1983) and collects the band's studio hits from the Capitol Records years on a single disc, including the semi-rarities of the Ann Wilson and Cheap Trick singer Robin Zander duet "Surrender to Me" and the previously unreleased studio cover version of John Farnham's "You're the Voice".

== Track listing ==
No.	Title	Writer(s)	Original album	Length
1.	"What About Love"	Brian Allen, Sheron Alton, Jim Vallance	Heart (1985)	3:47
2.	"If Looks Could Kill"	Jack Conrad, Bob Garrett	Heart	3:45
3.	"Never" (7" Remix)	Ann Wilson, Nancy Wilson, Greg Bloch, Holly Knight	Heart	4:05
4.	"These Dreams"	Martin Page, Bernie Taupin	Heart	4:14
5.	"Nothin' at All" (7" Remix)	Mark Mueller	Heart	4:11
6.	"Alone"	Tom Kelly, Billy Steinberg	Bad Animals (1987)	3:38
7.	"Who Will You Run To"	Diane Warren	Bad Animals	4:05
8.	"There's the Girl" (7" Remix)	Knight, N. Wilson	Bad Animals	3:55
9.	"Surrender to Me" (Duet with Ann Wilson and Robin Zander)	Richard Marx, Ross Vanelli	Tequila Sunrise soundtrack (1988)	4:05
10.	"All I Wanna Do Is Make Love to You"	Robert John "Mutt" Lange	Brigade (1990)	5:05
11.	"I Didn't Want to Need You"	Warren	Brigade	4:09
12.	"Tall, Dark Handsome Stranger"	Knight, Albert Hammond	Brigade	4:05
13.	"Stranded"	Jamie Kyle, Jeff Harrington	Brigade	3:58
14.	"You're the Voice" (Studio Version)	Andy Qunta, Keith Reid, Maggie Ryder, Chris Thompson	Previously unreleased, live version previously released on Rock the House Live! (1991)	4:27
15.	"Back to Avalon"	A. Wilson, N. Wilson, Kit Hain	Desire Walks On (1993)	3:40
16.	"Black on Black II"	A. Wilson, N. Wilson, Lisa Dalbello	Desire Walks On	3:50
17.	"Will You Be There (In the Morning)"	Lange	Desire Walks On	4:30
18.	"The Road Home"	A. Wilson	The Road Home (1995)	3:35

== Personnel ==
- Evren Göknar - Mastering Engineer

== Certifications ==
Certifications for Greatest Hits: 1985–1995
Region	Certification	Certified units/sales
United Kingdom (BPI)	Gold	100,000^{‡}
United States (RIAA)	Gold	500,000^{^}
^{^} Shipments figures based on certification alone.^{‡} Sales+streaming figures based on certification alone.
