= Rock the House Live! =

Live album by Heart
- Released: September 24, 1991
- Recorded: November 28, 1990
- Venue: Centrum (Worcester, Massachusetts)
- Genre: Hard rock
- Length: 62:43
- Label: Capitol
- Producers: Richard Erwin, Heart

Heart chronology
Brigade (1990)	Rock the House Live! (1991)	Desire Walks On (1993)

Singles from Rock the House Live!
- 1. "You're the Voice" (live) / "Call of the Wild (live)" Released: September 1991

Professional ratings
Review scores
Source	Rating
AllMusic	2/5 stars
Entertainment Weekly	C−
The Rolling Stone Album Guide	2.5/5 stars

Rock the House Live! is a live album released by the American hard rock band Heart in 1991. It was recorded at The Centrum, Worcester, MA, USA on November 28, 1990. The band performed a set of 22 songs (including "The Way Back Machine" guitar solo by Howard Leese); but only 14 were used on the album, missing most of their recent successful singles "These Dreams", "Never", "Alone", "What About Love", "All I Wanna Do Is Make Love to You", trying to demonstrate that Heart wasn't a band of ballad hits, but instead an arena rock staple. Instead of filling the album either with their early hard rock hits or their later pop ones, it is instead composed of mainly less familiar songs from recent albums (six from Brigade, one from Bad Animals, two from Heart and one from Passionworks), and a new cover.

The live version of "You're the Voice" was released as a single performing moderately well, reaching #20 on the US Mainstream Rock chart, whilst it was a minor hit in the UK reaching number 56. The studio version was recorded in 1989 as part of the sessions for the Brigade album, and finally included on Greatest Hits: 1985–1995 album in June 2000.

== Track listing ==
Rock the House Live! track listing
No.	Title	Writer(s)	Length
1.	"Wild Child"	Robert John "Mutt" Lange, Craig Joiner, Anthony Mitman	5:20
2.	"Fallen from Grace"	Sammy Hagar, Denny Carmassi, Jesse Harms	4:26
3.	"Call of the Wild"	Ann Wilson, Nancy Wilson, Howard Leese, Mark Andes, Denny Carmassi, Sue Ennis	4:31
4.	"How Can I Refuse?"	A. Wilson, N. Wilson, Leese, Ennis	5:04
5.	"Shell Shock"	A. Wilson, N. Wilson, Leese, Andes, Carmassi, Ennis	4:15
6.	"Love Alive"	A. Wilson, Roger Fisher, N. Wilson	5:29
7.	"Under the Sky"	A. Wilson, N. Wilson, Ennis	3:05
8.	"The Night"	Hagar, Carmassi, A. Wilson, N. Wilson	6:51
9.	"Tall, Dark Handsome Stranger"	Holly Knight, Albert Hammond	3:56
10.	"If Looks Could Kill"	Jack Conrad, Bob Garrett	3:36
11.	"Who Will You Run To"	Diane Warren	4:17
12.	"You're the Voice"	Andy Qunta, Keith Reid, Maggie Ryder, Chris Thompson	5:59
13.	"The Way Back Machine"	Leese	0:57
14.	"Barracuda"	A. Wilson, Fisher, N. Wilson, Michael DeRosier	4:52

== Personnel ==
Heart

- Ann Wilson – lead vocals, flute, autoharp
- Nancy Wilson – backing vocals, guitars (acoustic, electric and resonator), harmonica, mandolin
- Howard Leese – lead guitar, keyboards, mandolin, backing vocals
- Mark Andes – bass guitar, 12-string acoustic guitar, backing vocals
- Denny Carmassi – drums

Production

- Richard Erwin – producer, live engineer
- David Hewitt, Phil Gitomer, Sean Webb, Roger Binette – live engineers
- Stanley Johnston – post-production engineer
- Mike Clink, Ed Thacker – mixing at Can-Am Recorders
- Jeff Poe – mixing assistant

== Charts ==
1991 weekly chart performance for Rock the House Live!
Chart (1991)	Peak position
Australian Albums (ARIA)	150
Canada Top Albums/CDs (RPM)	63
Japanese Albums (Oricon)	49
UK Albums (Official Charts)	45
US Billboard 200	107
