= Greatest Hits (1998 Heart album) =

Greatest hits album by Heart
- Released: August 25, 1998
- Recorded: 1975–1983, 1998
- Genre: Hard rock, power pop, folk rock
- Length: 76:25
- Label: Epic/Legacy

Heart chronology
These Dreams: Greatest Hits (1997)	Greatest Hits (1998)	Greatest Hits: 1985–1995 (2000)

Professional ratings
Review scores
Source	Rating
Allmusic	4.5/5 stars
The Rolling Stone Album Guide	4/5 stars

Greatest Hits is a compilation album by the American rock band Heart. This compilation collects Heart's hits from 1975 through 1983, with one all-new studio recording, the Diane Warren-penned "Strong, Strong Wind", the song also recorded by Air Supply for their 1997 album The Book of Love. The collection, which was limited to release in the U.S. and Japan, acted as a 'first volume' of two greatest hits releases, the companion being the widely released Greatest Hits: 1985–1995 (2000). Other territories confusingly experienced the Capitol Records release of These Dreams: Greatest Hits (1997) instead of this collection, which featured a selection of tracks from 1976–1995.

== Track listing ==
No.	Title	Writer(s)	Original album	Length
1.	"Strong, Strong Wind"	Diane Warren	Previously unreleased	4:28
2.	"Magic Man"	Ann Wilson, Nancy Wilson	Dreamboat Annie (1975)	5:28
3.	"Crazy on You"	A. Wilson, N. Wilson, Roger Fisher	Dreamboat Annie	4:54
4.	"Dreamboat Annie (Reprise)"	A. Wilson, N. Wilson	Dreamboat Annie	3:50
5.	"Barracuda"	A. Wilson, N. Wilson, Roger Fisher, Michael DeRosier	Little Queen (1977)	4:21
6.	"Little Queen"	A. Wilson, N. Wilson, DeRosier, Fisher, Steve Fossen, Howard Leese	Little Queen	5:10
7.	"Kick It Out"	A. Wilson	Little Queen	2:45
8.	"Love Alive"	A. Wilson, N. Wilson, Fisher	Little Queen	4:23
9.	"Heartless"	A. Wilson, N. Wilson	Magazine (1977)	5:00
10.	"Straight On"	A. Wilson, N. Wilson, Sue Ennis	Dog & Butterfly (1978)	5:09
11.	"Dog & Butterfly"	A. Wilson, N. Wilson, Ennis	Dog & Butterfly	5:22
12.	"Even It Up"	A. Wilson, N. Wilson, Ennis	Bébé le Strange (1980)	5:10
13.	"Bebe le Strange"	A. Wilson, N. Wilson, Ennis, Fisher	Bébé le Strange	3:40
14.	"Tell It Like It Is"	George Davis, Lee Diamond	Greatest Hits/Live (1980)	4:28
15.	"This Man Is Mine"	A. Wilson, N. Wilson, Ennis	Private Audition (1982)	3:08
16.	"How Can I Refuse?"	A. Wilson, N. Wilson, Ennis, Leese, Mark Andes, Denny Carmassi	Passionworks (1983)	3:56
17.	"Rock and Roll" (Live)	John Bonham, John Paul Jones, Jimmy Page, Robert Plant	Greatest Hits/Live	5:55
