= Dreamboat Annie Live =

2007 live DVD released by Heart

Video by Heart
- Released: October 23, 2007
- Recorded: April 17, 2007
- Venue: Orpheum Theatre, Los Angeles
- Genre: Hard rock, folk rock
- Length: 90 min.
- Label: Shout! Factory/Sony BMG
- Director: Ivan Dudynsky
- Producer: Bill Cracknell, Carol Peters, Nikki Varhely-Gillingham

Heart video chronology
Alive in Seattle (2003)	Dreamboat Annie Live (2007)	Live: Soundstage (2008)

Dreamboat Annie Live

Live album by Heart
- Released: October 23, 2007
- Recorded: April 17, 2007
- Venue: Orpheum Theatre, Los Angeles,
- Genre: Hard rock, folk rock
- Length: 70:48
- Label: Shout! Factory
- Producer: Nancy Wilson, Craig Bartock, Jeff Palo, Carol Peters

Heart chronology
Love Songs (2006)	Dreamboat Annie Live (2007)	Playlist: The Very Best of Heart (2008)

Professional ratings
Review scores
Source	Rating
Allmusic	(DVD)
The Music Box	4/5 stars

Dreamboat Annie Live is a live DVD released by the American rock band Heart in October 2007, which features Heart performing all ten songs from their 1975 debut album, Dreamboat Annie, plus five extra performances. The concert was also broadcast on DirecTV. The concert soundtrack was released as a live album, with the UK edition containing two bonus live tracks.

The DVD is the first in the Shout! Factory's "Legendary Albums Live" series.

== Reviews ==
The album was favourably reviewed. At AllMusic, Andrew Leahey said "For those fans who prefer Heart's early material to the slick, hairsprayed singles of the '80s, Dreamboat Annie Live is a reminder that this band did – and, indeed, does – rock the boat."

== Track listing ==
All songs by Ann Wilson and Nancy Wilson, except where indicated

1. "Magic Man" - 5:52
2. "Dreamboat Annie (Fantasy Child)" - 1:23
3. "Crazy on You" - 4:42
4. "Soul of the Sea" - 6:34
5. "Dreamboat Annie" - 2:48
6. "White Lightning and Wine" - 3:38
7. "(Love Me Like Music) I'll Be Your Song" - 3:38
8. "Sing Child" (A. Wilson, N. Wilson, Roger Fisher, Steve Fossen) - 4:15
9. "How Deep It Goes" (A. Wilson) - 4:31
10. "Dreamboat Annie (Reprise)" - 4:15
11. "Mistral Wind" (A. Wilson, N. Wilson, Sue Ennis, Fisher) - 8:24
12. "Goodbye Blue Sky" (Roger Waters) - 3:54
13. "Black Dog" (John Paul Jones, Jimmy Page, Robert Plant) - 4:51
14. "Misty Mountain Hop" (Jones, Page, Plant) - 5:01
15. "Love, Reign o'er Me" (Pete Townshend) - 6:54

British CD release bonus tracks

16. "Love Alive" (A. Wilson, N. Wilson, Fisher) - 4:52
17. "Isolation" (John Lennon) - 4:12

== Personnel ==
=== Heart ===
- Ann Wilson – lead vocals, flute, percussion
- Nancy Wilson – rhythm guitar, 12-string guitar, harmonica, vocals, percussion, audio producer
- Craig Bartock – lead guitar, banjo, backing vocals, audio producer
- Debbie Shair – keyboards
- Ric Markmann – bass, didjeridu
- Ben Smith – percussion, drums, tympani

=== Additional musicians ===
- Darian Sahanaja – percussion, sound effects, vocals, vocal arrangement, string arrangements, string conductor
- Andreas Forsman – violin
- Lena Bergström, Anna Landberg Dager – cellos
- Jeffrey Foskett, Libby Torrance – backing vocals

=== CD production ===
- Shawn Amos, Bob Emmer – series producers
- Jeff Palo, Carol Peters – producers
- Stewart Whitmore – digital editing
- Stephen Marcussen – mastering
- Emily Johnson – artwork, package supervision
- Robert Y. Kim – project assistant
