= Scott Olson =

American musician

- Also known as: Scotty Olson
- Born: 1954 or 1955 (age 71–72); United States
- Occupations: Musician, producer, recording engineer
- Instruments: Guitar, bass, keyboards
- Years active: 1985–2018
- Formerly of: Heart

Scott Olson is an American guitarist, bassist, music producer and recording engineer. He played guitar with Heart between 1995 and 1998 and between 2002 and 2003, and in 1996 he performed with Alice In Chains on their MTV Unplugged concert. Olson was a recording consultant for Cameron Crowe's 2000 film Almost Famous. He performed with Alice in Chains again on February 18, 2005, during a benefit concert in Seattle for the victims of the 2004 tsunami disaster, and joined the band one more time to perform the song "No Excuses" at their concert in Washington, D.C., on October 25, 2006.

Olson produced and engineered albums for artists such as Heart, Jerry Cantrell, Queensrÿche, Deftones, Limp Bizkit, Pauline Oliveros, Powerman 5000, Unearth, Buckcherry and Dredg.

Olson attended Mount Si High School in Snoqualmie, Washington.

In 2018, Olson was diagnosed with progressive dementia. In August 2018, Heart guitarist Nancy Wilson and Alice in Chains shared on their social media pages a crowdfunding set up by friends of Olson to help cover his assisted living costs and medical expenses. As of 2019, Olson lives in a senior living facility in Kirkland, Washington.

== Discography ==
=== Performer ===
Year	Album	Artist	Notes
1992	A Very Special Christmas, Vol. 2: Released: October 20, 1992; Label: A&M Records	Various	vocals on "Blue Christmas"
1994	Tribute to Edith Piaf: Released: June 28, 1994; Label: Amherst Records	Various	guitar on "Jezebel"
1996	MTV Unplugged: Released: July 30, 1996; Label: Columbia Records	Alice in Chains	acoustic rhythm guitar; acoustic bass on "Killer Is Me"
1999	WASBE '99: Oklahoma State University Wind Ensemble: Released: August 16, 1999; Label: Mark Records	Oklahoma State Wind Ensemble	percussion
2002	Guilty Pleasures: Released: November 16, 2002; Label: Self-released	Peepshow	composer, guitars, strings
2003	Alive in Seattle: Released: June 11, 2003; Label: BMG	Heart	guitars, background vocals
2005	B-Sides & Rarities: Released: October 4, 2005; Label: Rhino Entertainment/Maverick	Deftones	guitar on "Change (In The House Of Flies)"
2006	The Essential Alice in Chains: Released: September 5, 2006; Label: Columbia Records	Alice in Chains	acoustic rhythm guitar on "Nutshell" and "Over Now"
2008	Playlist: The Very Best of Heart: Released: July 8, 2008; Label: Epic/Legacy	Heart	lead guitar, backing vocals
2008	Playlist Plus: A Very Special Christmas: Released: October 14, 2008; Label: A&M Records	Various	guitar, keyboards, background vocals
2011	A Very Special Christmas Vol. 1 & Vol. 2: Released: August 23, 2011; Label: A&M Records	Various	guitar, keyboards, background vocals
2012	Strange Euphoria: Released: June 5, 2012; Label: Epic/Legacy	Heart	guitar, background vocals

=== Production ===
Year	Album	Artist	Notes
1985	Heart	Heart	guitar technician
1992	A Very Special Christmas, Vol. 2	Various	producer
1995	The Road Home	Heart	engineer, production manager
1996	Home Alive: The Art of Self Defense	Various	producer, engineer, mixing
1998	Collection	Mike Strickland	engineer
1998	Boggy Depot	Jerry Cantrell	assistant engineer
1999	Makin' Bacon	The Rockinghams	producer, engineer
1999	Buckcherry	Buckcherry	engineer, programming
1999	Music Bank	Alice in Chains	recording, producer
2000	White Pony	Deftones	recording/Pro-Tools engineer
2000	Musicworks 76: Changing The Score	Pauline Oliveros	electronics on "Primordial/Lift"
2000	Almost Famous (Music From The Motion Picture)	Various	recording on "Fever Dog"
2000	Chocolate Starfish and the Hot Dog Flavored Water	Limp Bizkit	engineer
2000	Little Nicky (Music From the Motion Picture)	Various	engineer, Pro-Tools
2001	Valentine (Original Motion Picture Soundtrack)	Various	engineer, Pro-Tools
2001	Live Raw in Germany	The Hellecasters	live mixing
2001	Microfish	Spys4Darwin	engineer
2001	Anyone for Doomsday?	Powerman 5000	engineer, Pro-Tools
2002	Guilty Pleasures	Peepshow	producer, composer, guitars, strings
2003	Tribe	Queensrÿche	engineer
2003	Back to School (Mini Maggit)	Deftones	engineer, digital editing
2005	Catch Without Arms	Dredg	engineer, Pro-Tools
2005	B-Sides & Rarities	Deftones	engineer, Pro-Tools
2006	III: In the Eyes of Fire	Unearth	engineer
2007	Moody Glow	Future Fossils	producer, engineer
2008	Playlist Plus: A Very Special Christmas	Various	producer
2009	Feathergun	Rishloo	producer, engineer, mixing
2011	A Very Special Christmas Vol. 1 & Vol. 2	Various	producer
2016	The Studio Album Collection	Deftones	engineer, Pro-Tools

== Photography credits ==
Year	Album	Artist
1991	Kant Sheck Dees Bluze	Jimmy Dawkins
1992	Tell My Story Movin'	Louis Myers
2001	Adult Time	The Bottletones
2009	Midlife: A Beginner's Guide to Blur	Blur
