= Love Songs (Heart album) =

Compilation album by Heart
- Released: January 10, 2006
- Recorded: 1980–2005
- Genre: Rock, pop rock
- Length: 51:02
- Label: Epic/Legacy

Heart chronology
| Love Alive (2005) | Love Songs (2006) | Dreamboat Annie Live (2007) |

Professional ratings
Review scores
| Source | Rating |
|---|---|
| Allmusic | (mixed) |

Love Songs is a compilation album by the American rock band Heart. It was released January 10, 2006.

The collection features a couple of rarities: the live version here of "Unchained Melody" was originally included in the vinyl edition of "Greatest Hits Live" in 1980, but omitted from the CD release of that collection due to initial limitations in CD technology in relation to album length.

"Love Song", as well as being exclusive to this CD release, is Heart's only recorded version of Leslie Duncan's track. "Love Song", "Alone" and "These Dreams" are all taken from Heart's live Soundstage performance in 2005, and are the only CD releases from that show, as well as being featured on the full DVD release.

== Track listing ==
1. "Sweet Darlin'" - 3:20
2. "Alone" (live) - 4:06
3. "Magic Man" (live) - 5:08
4. "One Word" - 4:35
5. "Love Song" (live) - 3:38
6. "Lighter Touch" - 5:06
7. "These Dreams" (live) - 4:37
8. "No Other Love" - 4:05
9. "How Can I Refuse?" - 3:53
10. "Unchained Melody" (live) - 4:32
11. "Love Alive" - 4:24
12. "What About Love" - 3:42
