= Alive in Seattle =

2003 live album by Heart

Video by Heart
- Released: 11 June 2003
- Recorded: 8 August 2002
- Venue: Paramount Theatre, Seattle, Washington
- Genre: Hard rock, pop rock, folk rock
- Length: 104 min.
- Label: BMG - Image
- Director: Dave Diomedi
- Producer: Katie McNeil, Jordan Berliant

Heart video chronology
The Road Home (1995)	Alive in Seattle (2003)	Dreamboat Annie Live (2007)

Alive in Seattle

Live album by Heart
- Released: 11 June 2003
- Recorded: 8 August 2002
- Venue: Paramount Theatre, Seattle, Washington
- Genre: Hard rock
- Length: 99:32
- Label: Epic/Legacy
- Producer: Jordan Berliant, Jeff Magid

Heart chronology
The Essential Heart (2002)	Alive in Seattle (2003)	Jupiters Darling (2004)

Professional ratings
Review scores
Source	Rating
Allmusic	3/5 stars

Alive in Seattle is a live DVD and album released in 2003 by the American rock band Heart. It is a recording of their final concert in Seattle, during their "Summer of Love Tour" in summer 2002. The show included many of their greatest hits and some new songs. The soundtrack of the concert was released in a double-CD package. A Blu-ray transfer was released in 2008.

== Track listing ==
Disc one
No.	Title	Writer(s)	Length
1.	"Crazy on You"	Ann Wilson, Nancy Wilson	5:13
2.	"Sister Wild Rose" (new song)	A. Wilson, N. Wilson, Sue Ennis	3:38
3.	"The Witch" (The Sonics cover)	Gerry Roslie	3:59
4.	"Straight On"	A. Wilson, N. Wilson, Ennis	5:31
5.	"These Dreams"	Martin Page, Bernie Taupin	5:48
6.	"Mistral Wind"	A. Wilson, N. Wilson, Ennis, Roger Fisher	7:39
7.	"Alone"	Tom Kelly, Billy Steinberg	4:48
8.	"Dog & Butterfly"	A. Wilson, N. Wilson, Ennis	6:15
9.	"Mona Lisas and Mad Hatters" (Elton John cover)	Elton John, Taupin	5:50
10.	"The Battle of Evermore" (Led Zeppelin cover)	Jimmy Page, Robert Plant	5:49

Disc two
No.	Title	Writer(s)	Length
1.	"Heaven" (new song)	A. Wilson, N. Wilson, Ennis	5:51
2.	"Magic Man"	A. Wilson, N. Wilson	6:00
3.	"Two Faces of Eve" (new song)	A. Wilson, N. Wilson, Ennis	4:16
4.	"Love Alive"	A. Wilson, N. Wilson, Fisher	5:52
5.	"Break the Rock" (new song)	A. Wilson, N. Wilson, Ennis	3:54
6.	"Barracuda"	A. Wilson, N. Wilson, Fisher, Michael DeRosier	6:10
7.	"Wild Child"	Robert John "Mutt" Lange, Craig Joiner, Anthony Mitman	4:37
8.	"Black Dog" (Led Zeppelin cover)	Page, Plant, John Paul Jones	6:12
9.	"Dreamboat Annie (Reprise)"	A. Wilson, N. Wilson	3:27

== Personnel ==
=== Heart ===
- Ann Wilson – lead and backing vocals, acoustic guitar, autoharp, flute, ukulele
- Nancy Wilson – lead and backing vocals, lead and rhythm guitars, acoustic guitar, mandolin, ukulele
- Scott Olson – lead and rhythm guitars, acoustic guitar, lap steel, backing vocals
- Tom Kellock – keyboards
- Mike Inez – bass guitar
- Ben Smith – drums, percussion
