= Heart Presents a Lovemongers' Christmas =

Studio album by Heart
- Released: November 20, 2001
- Recorded: July 1997–July 1998
- Studio: Stepping Stone, Seattle, Washington; Studio X, Seattle, Washington (Note: "How Beautiful"); Take One (Burbank, California) (Note: "Here Is Christmas")
- Genre: Christmas
- Length: 36:02
- Label: Beyond Music
- Producer: Lovemongers

Heart chronology
Greatest Hits: 1985–1995 (2000)	Heart Presents a Lovemongers' Christmas (2001)	The Essential Heart (2002)

Lovemongers chronology
Whirlygig (1997)	Here Is Christmas (1998)

Here Is Christmas cover

Professional ratings
Review scores
Source	Rating
AllMusic	(original release)
AllMusic	2/5 stars
antiMusic	5/5 stars

Heart Presents a Lovemongers' Christmas is a Christmas album and the twelfth studio album by American rock band Heart. It was originally released under the title Here Is Christmas on October 20, 1998, by 2b Music, serving as the second album of the Lovemongers, a side project involving Ann and Nancy Wilson, their longtime friend and collaborator Sue Ennis and Frank Cox.

On November 20, 2001, Beyond Music re-released Here Is Christmas as a Heart album with the same track listing and new artwork. The album was reissued on November 16, 2004, by Sovereign Artists with a different cover and two bonus tracks—"Mary" and "Let's Stay In".

== Track listing ==
No.	Title	Writer(s)	Length
1.	"Here Is Christmas"	Ann Wilson; Nancy Wilson; Richie Zito	4:11
2.	"Balulalow"	James Wedderburn; John Wedderburn; Robert Wedderburn	1:18
3.	"Christmas Waits"	A. Wilson; Sue Ennis; N. Wilson	3:06
4.	"William and Rose"	A. Wilson; Ennis	3:54
5.	"Ave Maria"	Franz Schubert; A. Wilson (ad.); N. Wilson (ad.)	4:49
6.	"How Beautiful"	A. Wilson; Ennis; N. Wilson; Frank Cox	5:28
7.	"The Last Noel"	Cox	4:21
8.	"It's Christmas Time"	A. Wilson; Ennis; N. Wilson; Cox	3:37
9.	"Oh Holy Night!"	Adolphe Adam	3:20
10.	"Bring a Torch"	Traditional	1:58
Total length:			36:02

2004 reissue
No.	Title	Writer(s)	Length
1.	"Here Is Christmas"	A. Wilson; N. Wilson; Zito	4:12
2.	"Christmas Waits"	A. Wilson; Ennis; N. Wilson	3:08
3.	"Mary"	Patty Griffin	4:50
4.	"How Beautiful"	A. Wilson; Ennis; N. Wilson; Cox	5:29
5.	"William and Rose"	A. Wilson; Ennis	3:56
6.	"Let's Stay In"	A. Wilson; Ennis	3:27
7.	"Balulalow"	James Wedderburn; John Wedderburn; R. Wedderburn	1:19
8.	"Ave Maria"	Schubert; A. Wilson (ad.); N. Wilson (ad.)	4:51
9.	"The Last Noel"	Cox	4:23
10.	"It's Christmas Time"	A. Wilson; Ennis; N. Wilson; Cox	3:38
11.	"Oh Holy Night!"	Adam	3:19
12.	"Bring a Torch"	Traditional	1:57
Total length:			44:29

== Personnel ==
Credits adapted from the liner notes of Heart Presents a Lovemongers' Christmas and its 2004 reissue.

=== Lovemongers ===
- Ann Wilson
- Nancy Wilson
- Sue Ennis
- Frank Cox
- Ben Smith

=== Additional musicians ===
- Brad Allison – flugelhorn, piccolo trumpet
- Dewey Marler – clarinet, flute
- Mary Frank – concert harp
- Probyn Gregory – flugelhorn (2004 reissue)
- Craig Bartock – additional guitars on "Mary" and "Let's Stay In"

=== Technical ===
- Lovemongers – production
- Daniel Mendez – engineering
- Sig Skaylan – second engineer
- Eric Oz – second engineer
- Mark Guenther – mastering at Seattle Disc Mastering (2001 release)
- Craig Bartock – engineering (2004 reissue)
- Ghian Wright – second engineer (2004 reissue); production on "Mary" and "Let's Stay In"
- Nancy Wilson – production on "Mary" and "Let's Stay In"

=== Artwork ===
- Klaus Whitley – album art, design, back cover photo (2004 reissue)
- Nancy Wilson – cover photo (2004 reissue)
