= Jupiters Darling =

Studio album by Heart
- Released: June 22, 2004
- Recorded: November 2003–March 2004
- Studio: Whoville (Seattle); The Back Yard (Los Angeles); Ice Station Zebra (Seattle); Vaughn Verdi's house (Los Angeles)
- Genre: Hard rock; folk rock
- Length: 62:04
- Label: Sovereign Artists
- Producer: Nancy Wilson; Craig Bartock

Heart chronology
Alive in Seattle (2003)	Jupiters Darling (2004)	Love Alive (2005)

Professional ratings
Review scores
Source	Rating
AllMusic	4/5 stars
The Daily Vault	D
Entertainment Weekly	B+
Mojo	3/5 stars
Q	3/5 stars
Rolling Stone	3/5 stars
The Rolling Stone Album Guide	3/5 stars
Smash Hits	4/10 stars

Jupiters Darling is the thirteenth studio album by American rock band Heart, released on June 22, 2004, by Sovereign Artists. Sovereign Artist's marketing director, Paul Angles, simultaneously released their album via file sharing networks, which were included in an amicus curiae brief to the US Supreme Court. Two promotional singles were released simultaneously with the album: "The Oldest Story in the World", which peaked at number 22 on Billboard's Heritage Rock chart, and "The Perfect Goodbye". Heart performed "The Perfect Goodbye" with country singer Wynonna Judd on CMT Crossroads on July 9, 2004.

This album continued the move back to Heart's hard rock and folk rock roots. It peaked at number 94 on the US Billboard 200.

The album cover bears an image of the Mandelbrot set, rotated so the main cardioid is oriented the same way a heart would normally be, with the cusp at top. The album cover art is seen briefly in the 2005 film Elizabethtown, for which Nancy Wilson provided soundtrack music; at the time she was married to the film's director and screenwriter, Cameron Crowe.

== Track listing ==
No.	Title	Writer(s)	Length
1.	"Make Me"	Nancy Wilson; Ann Wilson; Craig Bartock	3:57
2.	"Oldest Story in the World"	N. Wilson; A. Wilson; Bartock	3:53
3.	"Things"	N. Wilson; Bartock	2:45
4.	"The Perfect Goodbye"	N. Wilson; A. Wilson; Bartock	3:37
5.	"Enough"	A. Wilson; Bartock	3:25
6.	"Move On"	N. Wilson; A. Wilson; Bartock	5:00
7.	"I Need the Rain"	N. Wilson; Bartock	4:20
8.	"I Give Up"	N. Wilson; A. Wilson; Bartock; Sue Ennis; Ben Smith	3:50
9.	"Vainglorious"	N. Wilson; A. Wilson; Bartock	3:57
10.	"No Other Love"	Chuck Prophet	4:02
11.	"Led to One"	N. Wilson; Bartock	2:56
12.	"Down the Nile"	N. Wilson; A. Wilson	4:49
13.	"I'm Fine"	N. Wilson; Bartock	2:59
14.	"Fallen Ones"	N. Wilson; A. Wilson; Bartock	3:42
15.	"Lost Angel"	N. Wilson	6:56
16.	"Hello Moonglow"	N. Wilson; Bartock	1:56
Total length:			62:04

UK edition bonus tracks
No.	Title	Writer(s)	Length
17.	"How Deep It Goes"	A. Wilson	3:07
18.	"Fallen Ones" (acoustic)	N. Wilson; A. Wilson; Bartock	3:47
Total length:			68:58

=== Notes ===
- Upon the album's initial release, an exclusive additional track, "Fireflies and Stars", was available for a limited time as a digital-only download.

== Personnel ==
Credits adapted from the liner notes of Jupiters Darling.

=== Heart ===
- Ann Wilson – lead vocals, harmonies, spoken word
- Nancy Wilson – lead vocals (tracks 3, 7, 11, 13, 16); harmonies, electric and acoustic guitars, mandolins, mandocello, dulcimer, blues harp, piano, megaphone, string arrangements
- Craig Bartock – lead guitar, acoustics, pump organ, EBow orchestra, Mellotron, marimba, harmonies, string arrangements
- Darian Sahanaja – keyboards, Stylophone
- Mike Inez – bass, tambourine
- Ben Smith – drums, cardboard boxes

=== Additional musicians ===
- Jami Sieber – cello
- Ravi Jakhotia – percussion
- Terry Davison – pedal steel guitar (track 7)
- Mike McCready – EBow guitar (track 11); Leslie guitar (track 12); lead guitars (track 13)
- Jerry Cantrell – guitar (track 14)

=== Technical ===
- Nancy Wilson – production, mixing
- Craig Bartock – production, engineering, mixing
- Dave Dysart – engineering
- Patrick MacDougall – engineering, mixing
- Kam Dahlin – engineering
- Brian "Big Bass" Gardner – mastering at Bernie Grundman Mastering (Los Angeles)

=== Artwork ===
- Nancy Wilson – album design, snapshots
- Klaus Whitley – album design, graphic design, additional images, angel wings
- Randee St. Nicholas – photos
- Sabrina Voll – additional images
- Patrick MacDougall – additional images
- Thomas Day – fractal designs
- Theresa Day – fractal designs

== Charts ==
Chart performance for Jupiters Darling
Chart (2004)	Peak position
Japanese Albums (Oricon)	222
UK Albums (OCC)	120
UK Independent Albums (OCC)	10
US Billboard 200	94
US Independent Albums (Billboard)	3
