= The Road Home (Heart album) =

1995 live album by Heart

Live album by Heart
- Released: August 29, 1995
- Recorded: August 12–16, 1994
- Venues: Backstage Club, Seattle, Washington
- Genre: Acoustic rock
- Length: 74:37
- Label: Capitol
- Producer: John Paul Jones

Heart chronology
Desire Walks On (1993)	The Road Home (1995)	These Dreams: Greatest Hits (1997)

The Road Home

Video by Heart
- Released: 1995
- Recorded: May 12, 1995
- Venues: Moore Theatre, Seattle, Washington
- Genre: Acoustic rock
- Length: 88:58
- Label: Capitol
- Director: Joel Gallen
- Producer: Douglas C. Forbes

Heart video chronology
If Looks Could Kill (1988)	The Road Home (1995)	Alive in Seattle (2003)

Professional ratings
Review scores
Source	Rating
AllMusic	3/5 stars
Entertainment Weekly	B
Q	3/5 stars
The Rolling Stone Album Guide	4/5 stars

The Road Home, a live album released in 1995, is the fourteenth album overall by the rock group Heart. It chronicles a club performance in the "unplugged" style in their home city of Seattle. The setlist contains acoustic versions of many of the band's hits including "Dreamboat Annie", "Alone", "Barracuda".

The album was produced by John Paul Jones of Led Zeppelin, a band to whom Ann and Nancy Wilson paid tribute with their band the Lovemongers. "He was a prince among men," enthused Ann. The cover photograph shows an old picture of a young Ann and Nancy Wilson with a candle.

The album reached number eighty-seven on the U.S. Billboard 200.

In 1995, a VHS was released under the same name and with the same cover containing another concert from the same tour. The video was reissued on DVD in 2003.

== Track listing ==
The Road Home track listing
No.	Title	Writer(s)	Length
1.	"Dreamboat Annie (Fantasy Child)"	Ann Wilson, Nancy Wilson	3:35
2.	"Dog and Butterfly"	A. Wilson, N. Wilson, Sue Ennis	6:00
3.	"(Up On) Cherry Blossom Road" (previously unreleased)	Amy Sky	5:04
4.	"Back to Avalon"	A. Wilson, N. Wilson, Kit Hain	3:55
5.	"Alone"	Billy Steinberg, Tom Kelly	4:45
6.	"These Dreams"	Bernie Taupin, Martin Page	5:20
7.	"Love Hurts" (previously unreleased)	Boudleaux Bryant, Felice Bryant	4:30
8.	"Straight On"	A. Wilson, N. Wilson, Sue Ennis	5:10
9.	"All I Wanna Do Is Make Love to You"	Robert John "Mutt" Lange	3:40
10.	"Crazy on You"	A. Wilson, N. Wilson	5:13
11.	"Seasons" (previously unreleased)	Elton John, Bernie Taupin	3:40
12.	"River" (previously unreleased)	Joni Mitchell	3:40
13.	"Barracuda"	A. Wilson, N. Wilson, Roger Fisher, Michael DeRosier	4:40
14.	"Dream of the Archer" (includes uncredited excerpt of "Sylvan Song" during the intro)	A. Wilson, N. Wilson, Fisher	5:37
15.	"The Road Home" (unlisted bonus track, previously unreleased)	A. Wilson	4:35
16.	"Never" (Japanese edition bonus track)	A. Wilson, N. Wilson, Greg Bloch, Holly Knight	5:19

== VHS track listing ==
0. unlisted introduction interview with Ann & Nancy Wilson
1. "River"
2. "Dog and Butterfly"
3. "(Up on) Cherry Blossom Road"
4. "Back to Avalon"
5. "Alone"
6. "These Dreams"
7. "Dreamboat Annie (Fantasy Child)"
8. "Seasons"
9. "Dream of the Archer"
10. "Love Alive"
11. "All I Wanna Do Is Make Love to You"
12. "Straight On"
13. "Mistral Wind" (A. Wilson, N. Wilson, Ennis, Fisher)
14. "Barracuda"
15. "Love Hurts"
16. "Crazy on You"
17. "The Road Home"

=== DVD bonus material ===
18. The Road Home – electronic press kit
19. "Crazy on You" – live from The Tonight Show with Jay Leno
20. "The Road Home" – live from Later with Greg Kinnear

== Personnel ==
- Ann Wilson – lead vocals, guitars, autoharp, flute
- Nancy Wilson – vocals, guitars, mandolin
- Howard Leese – guitars, mandolin, keyboards, accordion, background vocals
- John Paul Jones – piano, bass, mandolin, producer (only on CD concert)
- Fernando Saunders – bass, background vocals
- Denny Fongheiser – drums, percussion
- Gary Gersh – percussion, executive producer
- Kristen Barry – background vocals
- Seattle Symphony string section (CD):
  - Gennady Filimonov, Leonid Keylin – violins
  - Vincent Comer – viola
  - David Tonkongui – cello
  - John DeJarnatt – oboe, English horn
- London Metropolitan String Quartet on track 12 and DVD:
  - Rosemary Furniss, David Ogden – violins
  - Andrew Brown – viola
  - Caroline Dale – cello
  - John Anderson – oboe
  - Roger Bolton – conductor

== Charts ==
Chart performance for The Road Home
Chart (1995)	Peak position
Canada Top Albums/CDs (RPM)	49
Japanese Albums (Oricon)	20
US Billboard 200	87

== Certifications ==
Certifications for The Road Home
Region	Certification	Certified units/sales
United States (RIAA)	Gold	500,000^{^}
^{^} Shipments figures based on certification alone.
