= Barracuda (song) =

1977 single by Heart

Single by Heart

from the album Little Queen
- B-side: "Cry to Me"
- Released: May 20, 1977
- Recorded: 1977
- Studio: Kaye Smith (Seattle)
- Genre: Hard rock
- Length: 4:20
- Label: Portrait
- Songwriters: Ann Wilson; Roger Fisher; Nancy Wilson; Michael Derosier
- Producer: Mike Flicker

Heart singles chronology
"Dreamboat Annie" (1976)	"Barracuda" (1977)	"Little Queen" (1977)

Music video
- "Barracuda" on YouTube

"Barracuda" is a song by American rock band Heart, released in 1977 on their third studio album, Little Queen, and was released as the album's lead single. The song peaked at number 11 on the Billboard Hot 100. "Barracuda" was named the 34th-best hard rock song of all time by VH1 in 2009.

The song was included on the compilation albums Greatest Hits/Live (1980), These Dreams: Greatest Hits (1997), Greatest Hits (1998), The Essential Heart (2002), Love Alive (2005), Playlist: The Very Best of Heart (2008) and Strange Euphoria (2012), and on the live albums Rock the House Live! (1991), The Road Home (1995), Alive in Seattle (2003) and Live in Atlantic City (2019).

== Origin ==
=== Lyrics ===
Ann Wilson revealed in interviews that the song was about Heart's anger towards Mushroom Records, who as a publicity stunt released a made-up story of an incestuous affair involving Ann and her sister Nancy Wilson. The song particularly focuses on Ann's rage towards a male radio promoter who came up to her after a concert asking how her "lover" was. She initially thought he was talking about her boyfriend, band manager Michael Fisher. After he revealed he was talking about her sister Nancy, Ann became outraged, went back to her hotel room, and wrote the original lyrics of the song. When she relayed the incident to Nancy, she, too, was infuriated. Nancy joined Ann and contributed a melody and bridge.

Producer Mike Flicker added that Mushroom Records was so obtuse in the contract negotiations that Heart decided to discard the album they were working on, Magazine—which the label still released in an unfinished form—and instead sign with the newly formed Portrait Records to make another record, Little Queen. As Flicker put it, "'Barracuda' was created conceptually out of a lot of this record business bullshit. Barracuda could be anyone from the local promotion man to the president of a record company. That is the barracuda. It was born out of that whole experience."

=== Music ===
The song is a straight-ahead rocker mostly in 4/4 time, but diverges in parts to the odder signatures 5/4 and 7/4. In 2021, Nancy Wilson praised "The cool little parts where it skips a beat here and skips a beat there. There are a couple of odd time signature things in there that bring it into a more sophisticated song. A sophisticated song of rage!"

In a March 2019 interview with Gear Factor, Nancy Wilson said:

"We'd been opening for a band called Nazareth in Europe and also for Queen. And Nazareth had a hit with a Joni Mitchell song that they covered [in 1973] called "This Flight Tonight" that had kind of that riff. So we kind of borrowed that. And we made it into 'Barracuda'. And we saw the guys from Nazareth later and they were pissed. 'You took our riff!' But that's kind of what everybody—you borrow from what you love and then you make it your own. It's one of those sounds too, it's one of those guitar tones that I'm still trying to figure out what we did. [Laughs] It's hard to re-create."

== Reception ==
"Barracuda" is a hard rock song incorporating elements of psychedelic rock. Upon the song's release, it became Heart's second top-20 entry in the United States, peaking at number 11 on the Billboard Hot 100, spending 20 weeks on the chart.

Cash Box called it "an aggressive rocker, tempered with sparkling production and Ann Wilson's alluring lead vocal.." Record World said that it is "tough, driving rock 'n' roll, topped by the Wilsons' evocative vocals."

== Usage at the 2008 Republican National Convention ==
"Barracuda" was played at the 2008 Republican National Convention in reference to John McCain's running mate, Sarah Palin, who claims she was known as "Sarah Barracuda" as a high school basketball star (and as "Sarracuda" after the convention, a play on her name). The Wilson sisters disapproved, as they disagreed with Palin's policies, and sent a cease-and-desist letter to John McCain's campaign, despite the McCain campaign's claim to have lawfully purchased rights to use the song.

In an appearance on a Seattle talk show, song co-writer and lead guitarist Roger Fisher announced he was thrilled with the RNC's use of the song, because it both resulted in royalties for the band and gave them an opportunity to publicly point out that he is a "staunch" supporter of Barack Obama. Michael Derosier, a co-writer of the song and the band's drummer on the recording, also supports the use of the song by the RNC. The McCain campaign continued to use the song, despite Nancy Wilson's statement to Entertainment Weekly that "Sarah Palin's views and values in no way represent us as American women."

== Personnel ==
Credits adapted from the liner notes of Little Queen.

- Ann Wilson – lead vocals
- Nancy Wilson – acoustic guitar, backing vocals
- Roger Fisher – lead guitar
- Howard Leese – rhythm guitar, mellotron
- Steve Fossen – bass guitar
- Michael DeRosier – drums

== Charts ==
=== Weekly charts ===
Chart (1977)	Peak position
Australia (Kent Music Report)	15
Austria (Ö3 Austria Top 40)	16
Belgium (Ultratop 50 Flanders)	30
Canada Top Singles (RPM)	2
Netherlands (Dutch Top 40 Tipparade)	4
Netherlands (Single Top 100)	29
New Zealand (Recorded Music NZ)	37
South Africa (Springbok Radio)	1
Sweden (Sverigetopplistan)	14
US Billboard Hot 100	11
US Cash Box Top 100	10
West Germany (GfK)	8

=== Year-end charts ===
Chart (1977)	Position
Australia (Kent Music Report)	94
Canada Top Singles (RPM)	37
South Africa (Springbok Radio)	3
US Billboard Hot 100	53
US Cash Box Top 100	71
West Germany (Media Control)	46

== Certifications ==
Region	Certification	Certified units/sales
New Zealand (RMNZ)	Platinum	30,000^{‡}
United Kingdom (BPI)	Gold	400,000^{‡}
^{‡} Sales+streaming figures based on certification alone.

== See also ==
- "Five Per Cent for Nothing", 1971 Yes instrumental whose title disparages the band's former manager
- "Death on Two Legs (Dedicated to...)", 1975 Queen song which similarly disparages the band's former manager and record label
