= Allies (song) =

Single by Heart

from the album Passionworks
- B-side: "Together Now"
- Released: October 1983
- Recorded: 1983
- Genre: Rock
- Length: 4:26 (Single Version); 4:42 (Album Version)
- Label: Epic
- Songwriter: Jonathan Cain
- Producer: Keith Olsen

Heart singles chronology
"How Can I Refuse?" (1983)	"Allies" (1983)	"What About Love" (1985)

"Allies" is a song recorded by the rock band Heart. It was released in 1983 as the second and final single from the band's seventh studio album Passionworks. The song was written by Jonathan Cain, best known as a member of the rock band Journey.

"Allies" was the final single released by Heart on the Epic Records label. The band's relationship with the label was sour at the time, and the Wilson sisters claim that Epic did not properly promote their final two albums on the label. "Allies" is a power ballad which begins with a subdued piano line before building into a metal style ballad complete with power guitar chords and booming drums. The song peaked at number eighty-three on the U.S. Billboard Hot 100, and stands as Heart's lowest-charting U.S. single along with "Unchained Melody." The band rebounded two years later, finding their biggest success yet as they joined Capitol Records.

== Chart performance ==
Chart (1983)	Peak position
U.S. Billboard Hot 100	83
