= Nothin' at All =

Single by Heart

from the album Heart
- B-side: "The Wolf"
- Released: April 3, 1986
- Recorded: 1985
- Genre: Power pop
- Length: 4:13
- Label: Capitol
- Songwriter: Mark Mueller
- Producer: Ron Nevison

Heart singles chronology
"These Dreams" (1986)	"Nothin' at All" (1986)	"If Looks Could Kill" (1986)

Music video
- "Nothin' at All" on YouTube

Professional ratings
Review scores
Source	Rating
Number One	1/5 stars

"Nothin' at All" is a song by American rock band Heart from their eponymous eighth studio album (1985). It was released on April 3, 1986, as the album's fourth single. The song was written by pop and musical theatre composer Mark Mueller.

The single peaked at number 10 on the Billboard Hot 100, becoming the band's ninth top-10 entry, as well as the fourth top-ten single from the parent album. It also reached number 8 on the R&R Magazine CHR (Contemporary Hit Radio) Airplay chart, where it spent two weeks. Additionally, it peaked at number 38 on the UK Singles Chart in 1988, after reaching number 76 two years earlier during its original release.

Musically, the track represents an embrace of the new wave and power pop styles of radio-friendly rock songs of the early-to-mid-1980s (akin to contemporary U.S. groups such as The Cars) with elements such as strident keyboard playing mixed with an emphasis on rhythm guitar. This artistic choice was a softening from the heavier sound of earlier releases by Heart that were closer to hard rock while retaining the same melodramatic balladry driven songwriting.

== Background and music video ==
The track functions as a love song that describes a new romantic relationship which falls into place without any interpersonal conflict or even real effort. In the lyrics, the song title has two meanings:

1. compared to her previous experiences, the narrator says the new relationship is like "nothin' at all"
2. when she asks the song's subject what he did to make falling in love so easy, his response is "nothin' at all"

The music video for "Nothin' at All" touches on the lyrical content of the song only abstractly and features a combination of comedic elements such as Ann and Nancy Wilson debating each other on fashion choices as well as numerous moments of a large black panther stalking different environments in a darkened building. The clip additionally displays band members either miming to the track or pretending to play instruments. As of December 2022, it has been well-received on YouTube, with the release featuring over nine million views.

== Reception ==
The U.S. publication Cash Box stated that "Ann Wilson’s ever exhilarating vocal force is dynamic as ever here, aided by sizzling rock guitar musicianship."

Music critic Joe Viglione of AllMusic praised the track for how it "explodes off the turntable", in his view, and he additionally remarked that it incorporates a "mix which is arguably producer Ron Nevison's finest moment." He commented how, musically, the track represents an embrace of the new wave and power pop styles of radio-friendly rock songs of the early to middle 1980s by Heart, bringing the group in line with the spirit of contemporary U.S. bands such as The Cars.

== Personnel ==
=== Heart ===
- Ann Wilson – vocals
- Nancy Wilson – lead guitar, background vocals
- Howard Leese – lead guitar, keyboards, background vocals
- Mark Andes – bass guitar
- Denny Carmassi – drums

=== Additional musicians ===
- Peter Wolf – synthesizers
- Johnny Colla – background vocals
- Lynn Wilson – background vocals
- Holly Knight – keyboards
- Frankie Sullivan – additional guitar

== Charts ==
Chart (1986)	Peak position
Australia (Kent Music Report)	87
Canada Top Singles (RPM)	29
UK Singles (Official Charts)	76
US Billboard Hot 100	10
US Adult Contemporary (Billboard)	40
US Mainstream Rock (Billboard)	6
US Cash Box Top 100	11

Chart (1988)	Peak position
Ireland (IRMA)	18
UK Singles (Official Charts)	38

== See also ==
- 1986 in music
- Heart discography
- New wave music
- Power pop music
