= Never (Heart song) =

1985 single by Heart

Single by Heart

from the album Heart
- B-side: "Shell Shock"
- Released: August 29, 1985
- Genre: Hard rock; Synth-rock
- Length: 4:07
- Label: Capitol
- Songwriters: Holly Knight; Gene Bloch; Connie (Note: Connie is a pseudonym for Ann Wilson, Nancy Wilson, and Sue Ennis)
- Producer: Ron Nevison

Heart singles chronology
"What About Love" (1985)	"Never" (1985)	"These Dreams" (1986)

Music video
- "Never" on YouTube

"Never" is a song by American rock band Heart, released on August 29, 1985, as the second single from the band's eponymous eighth studio album (1985). It was written by Holly Knight and Gene Bloch (both from the band Device), and "Connie" (a pseudonym for Ann Wilson, Nancy Wilson, and Sue Ennis).

"Never" is a rock song with an uplifting lyric to a person who has been discouraged by love. Like the preceding "What About Love", the music video for "Never" received heavy rotation on MTV.

"Never" peaked at number four on the Billboard Hot 100, marking the first time that Heart earned consecutive top ten entries, and the first time a Heart album generated two top ten singles. On the UK singles chart, it was a top 10 hit in 1988 as part of a double A-side reissue with "These Dreams", intended to capitalize on the success of "Alone" the previous year. While "Never" was ostensibly the lead track, airplay focused almost exclusively on "These Dreams".

A reworking of the song appears on the Japanese version of Heart's live album The Road Home. "Only in that version of 'Never'," observed Nancy Wilson, "did the song get the rootsy vibe that stands up to time."

== Reception ==
Cash Box said it is "a slow driving ballad" that has "a succinct arrangement and production." Billboard called it "crisply buoyant power rock."

== Personnel ==
=== Heart ===
- Ann Wilson – vocals
- Nancy Wilson – lead guitar, background vocals
- Howard Leese – lead guitar, keyboards, background vocals
- Mark Andes – bass guitar
- Denny Carmassi – drums

=== Additional musicians ===
- Peter Wolf – synthesizers
- Lynn Wilson – background vocals
- Holly Knight – keyboards

=== Technical ===
- Scotty Olson – guitar technician
- Gary Chalk – drum technician
- Ron Nevison – production, engineering
- Mike Clink – engineering assistance
- Brian Foraker – second assistant engineer
- Mike Reese – mastering at The Mastering Lab (Hollywood, California)

== Charts ==
=== Weekly charts ===
Weekly chart performance for "Never"
Chart (1985–1986)	Peak position
Australia (Kent Music Report)	48
Canada Top Singles (RPM)	13
Finland (Suomen virallinen lista)	20
US Billboard Hot 100	4
US Mainstream Rock (Billboard)	2
US Cash Box Top 100 Singles	6

Weekly chart performance for "Never"/"These Dreams"
Chart (1988)	Peak position
Europe (Eurochart Hot 100 Singles)	34
Ireland (IRMA)	10
UK Singles (Official Charts)	8

=== Year-end charts ===
1985 year-end chart performance for "Never"
Chart (1985)	Position
US Cash Box Top 100 Singles	71

1986 year-end chart performance for "Never"
Chart (1986)	Position
US Billboard Hot 100	18
