= How Can I Refuse? =

"How Can I Refuse"

Single by Heart

from the album Passionworks
- B-side: "Johnny Moon"
- Released: August 1983
- Recorded: 1983
- Genre: Rock
- Length: 3:56
- Label: Epic
- Songwriter(s): Ann Wilson; Nancy Wilson; Mark Andes; Denny Carmassi; Sue Ennis; Howard Leese
- Producer(s): Keith Olsen

Heart singles chronology
"This Man Is Mine" (1982)	"How Can I Refuse" (1983)	"Allies" (1983)

"How Can I Refuse" is a song recorded by the rock band Heart. It was released in 1983 as the first single from the band's seventh studio album Passionworks. The song is an uptempo rock tune which lyrically addresses the strong feelings of infatuation at the beginning of a romantic relationship.

"How Can I Refuse" was a successful album-oriented rock (AOR) hit, peaking at number one on the Billboard Top Rock Tracks chart, their only song to date to do so. The song also had moderate success on the pop charts, peaking at number forty-four on the Billboard Hot 100.

Cash Box called the song "good hard rock 'n' roll" and praised the energy level and vocal performance.

The song was Heart's first 12" single release in the UK, backed with "Barracuda" and "Little Queen".

== Chart performance ==
Chart (1983)	Peak position
U.S. Billboard Hot 100	44
U.S. Billboard Top Rock Tracks	1

== See also ==
- List of Billboard Mainstream Rock number-one songs of the 1980s
