= Passionworks =

Studio album by Heart
- Released: August 1983
- Recorded: March–June 1983
- Genres: Rock; hard rock
- Length: 42:00
- Label: Epic
- Producer: Keith Olsen

Heart chronology
Private Audition (1982)	Passionworks (1983)	Heart (1985)

Singles from Passionworks
- 1. "How Can I Refuse?" Released: August 1983; 2. "Allies" Released: October 1983

Passionworks is the seventh studio album by American rock band Heart, released in August 1983, by Epic Records. The album marks a shift in musical direction from hard rock and folk to mainstream rock. It is the first Heart album to feature Denny Carmassi and Mark Andes, who had replaced longtime members Mike Derosier and Steve Fossen. Passionworks was the band's final album with Epic Records before their comeback-fueled move to Capitol Records. It reached number 39 on the US Billboard 200. The album's lead single, "How Can I Refuse?", peaked at number 44 on the Billboard Hot 100 and topped the Hot Mainstream Rock Tracks chart for one week. The second single, "Allies", peaked at number 83 on the Billboard Hot 100.

On July 13, 2009, Passionworks was re-released in the United Kingdom by BGO Records as a double CD with the band's previous album Private Audition.

== Re-recording of tracks ==
Heart's sixteenth studio album, Beautiful Broken (2016), contains two re-recorded tracks from Passionworks, along with a few other re-recorded songs from their 1980s era and a few new ones. These two tracks are "Johnny Moon" and "Language of Love". In an interview with The Arizona Republic, Nancy Wilson explained the idea to re-record the songs, saying, "Like, 'Wow, these songs were so misunderstood production-wise.' And I thought I would love a chance to redesign and reimagine them in the studio."

== Critical reception ==
Professional ratings
Review scores
Source	Rating
AllMusic	3/5 stars
Rolling Stone	2/5 stars
The Rolling Stone Album Guide	2.5/5 stars

Errol Somay of Rolling Stone felt that the album "seems like the soundtrack to an off-Broadway show that closed after two nights", concluding, "Almost totally lacking in hummable tunes and danceable rhythms, Passionworks does little more than showcase Ann Wilson's vocal pyrotechnics." Alex Henderson of AllMusic wrote retrospectively, "Passionworks isn't recommended to casual listeners, but serious Heart devotees will find it to be an enjoyable way for the Wilson sisters to end their Epic period."

== Track listing ==
Side one
No.	Title	Writer(s)	Length
1.	"How Can I Refuse?"	Ann Wilson; Nancy Wilson; Sue Ennis; Howard Leese; Mark Andes; Denny Carmassi	3:52
2.	"Blue Guitar"	A. Wilson; N. Wilson; Leese; Andes; Carmassi; Ennis	3:54
3.	"Johnny Moon"	A. Wilson; N. Wilson; Ennis	4:00
4.	"Sleep Alone"	A. Wilson; Ennis	4:12
5.	"Together Now"	A. Wilson; N. Wilson; Ennis	3:50

Side two
No.	Title	Writer(s)	Length
6.	"Allies"	Jonathan Cain	4:44
7.	"(Beat by) Jealousy"	A. Wilson; Ennis	3:18
8.	"Heavy Heart"	A. Wilson; N. Wilson; Ennis; Keith Olsen	3:50
9.	"Love Mistake"	N. Wilson	3:28
10.	"Language of Love"	A. Wilson; N. Wilson; Ennis	3:38
11.	"Ambush"	A. Wilson; Ennis	3:14

== Personnel ==
Credits adapted from the liner notes of Passionworks.

=== Heart ===
- Ann Wilson – lead vocals, background vocals
- Nancy Wilson – lead vocals, background vocals, rhythm guitars, lead guitars, acoustic guitars, synthesizers
- Howard Leese – lead guitars, rhythm guitars, background vocals, synthesizers
- Mark Andes – bass, background vocals
- Denny Carmassi – drums

=== Additional musicians ===
- Keith Olsen – arrangements
- David Paich – piano (track 6); synthesizers (tracks 1–3, 6, 10)
- Steve Porcaro – synthesizers (track 11); synthesizer programming
- Lynn Wilson – background vocals (track 6)

=== Technical ===
- Keith Olsen – production, engineering
- Brian Foraker – engineering
- Dennis Sager – engineering
- Greg Fulginiti – mastering at Artisan Sound Recorders (California)

=== Artwork ===
- Neal Preston – concept, photography
- Tony Lane – art direction
- Isgo Lepejian – black-and-white photographic prints

== Charts ==
Chart performance for Passionworks
Chart (1983)	Peak position
Canada Top Albums/CDs (RPM)	88
US Billboard 200	39
US Rock Albums (Billboard)	4
