= Heart (Heart album) =

1985 studio album by Heart

Studio album by Heart
- Released: June 21, 1985
- Studios: The Record Plant (Los Angeles, California); The Plant (Sausalito, California)
- Genres: Rock; pop
- Length: 39:28
- Label: Capitol
- Producer: Ron Nevison

Heart chronology
Passionworks (1983)	Heart (1985)	Bad Animals (1987)

Singles from Heart
- 1. "What About Love" Released: 1985; 2. "Never" Released: August 29, 1985; 3. "These Dreams" Released: 1986; 4. "Nothin' at All" Released: April 3, 1986; 5. "If Looks Could Kill" Released: 1986

Professional ratings
Review scores
Source	Rating
AllMusic	4.5/5 stars
Kerrang!	3/5 stars
Rolling Stone	Unfavorable
The Rolling Stone Album Guide	2.5/5 stars

Heart is the eighth studio album by American rock band Heart, released on June 21, 1985, by Capitol Records. The album continued the band's transition into mainstream rock, a genre that yielded the band its greatest commercial success. Marking the band's Capitol Records debut, it became Heart's only album to top the US Billboard 200 to date. The album was eventually certified quintuple platinum by the Recording Industry Association of America (RIAA)—in contrast to Heart's previous two releases, Private Audition and Passionworks, which were uncertified.

The album yielded the band's first number-one single, "These Dreams", along with four other singles: "What About Love", "Never", "Nothin' at All", and "If Looks Could Kill", with the first four singles reaching the top 10 of the Billboard Hot 100. At the 28th Annual Grammy Awards, the album was nominated for a Grammy Award for Best Rock Performance by a Duo or Group with Vocal.

In a 2022 interview, Ann Wilson stated that the album was self-titled because the band "didn’t write a whole lot of the songs on there, so that aspect of closeness with the work was gone and it was much harder for us to come up with a title that was real."

In 2024, Loudwire staff elected it as the best hard rock album of 1985.

== Track listing ==
Side one
No.	Title	Writer(s)	Length
1.	"If Looks Could Kill"	Jack Conrad; Bob Garrett	3:42
2.	"What About Love"	Sheron Alton; Brian Allen; Jim Vallance	3:41
3.	"Never"	Holly Knight; Gene Bloch; Connie^{[a]}	4:07
4.	"These Dreams"	Bernie Taupin; Martin Page	4:15
5.	"The Wolf"	Ann Wilson; Nancy Wilson; Howard Leese; Mark Andes; Denny Carmassi; Sue Ennis	4:03

Side two
No.	Title	Writer(s)	Length
6.	"All Eyes"	Knight; Bloch; Connie^{[a]}	3:55
7.	"Nobody Home"	A. Wilson; N. Wilson; Ennis	4:07
8.	"Nothin' at All"	Mark Mueller	4:13
9.	"What He Don't Know"	A. Wilson; N. Wilson; Ennis	3:41
10.	"Shell Shock"	A. Wilson; N. Wilson; Leese; Andes; Carmassi; Ennis	3:42
Total length:			39:28

=== Notes ===
- ^{^[a]} Connie is a pseudonym for Ann Wilson, Nancy Wilson and Sue Ennis.

== Personnel ==
Credits adapted from the liner notes of Heart.

=== Heart ===
- Ann Wilson – vocals
- Nancy Wilson – lead guitar, acoustic guitar, mandolin, background vocals; lead vocals (track 4)
- Howard Leese – lead guitar, keyboards, mandolin, background vocals
- Mark Andes – bass guitar
- Denny Carmassi – drums

=== Additional musicians ===
- Peter Wolf – synthesizers, acoustic piano
- Mickey Thomas – background vocals (tracks 2, 6, 10)
- Johnny Colla – background vocals (tracks 4, 8)
- Grace Slick – background vocals (track 2)
- Lynn Wilson – background vocals
- Holly Knight – keyboards
- Frankie Sullivan – solo guitar (track 7); additional guitar (track 8)

=== Technical ===
- Scotty Olson – guitar technician
- Gary Clark – drum technician
- Ron Nevison – production, engineering
- Mike Clink – engineering assistance
- Brian Foraker – second assistant engineer
- Mike Reese – mastering at The Mastering Lab (Hollywood, California)

=== Artwork ===
- Rebecca Blake – photography
- Norman Moore – art direction, design

== Charts ==
=== Weekly charts ===
Weekly chart performance for Heart
Chart (1985–1988)	Peak position
Australian Albums (Kent Music Report)	37
Canada Top Albums/CDs (RPM)	3
European Albums (Music & Media)	59
Finnish Albums (Suomen virallinen lista)	18
German Albums (Offizielle Top 100)	57
Japanese Albums (Oricon)	30
Swedish Albums (Sverigetopplistan)	22
UK Albums (Official Charts)	19
US Billboard 200	1

=== Year-end charts ===
1985 year-end chart performance for Heart
Chart (1985)	Position
Canada Top Albums/CDs (RPM)	45
US Billboard 200	79

1986 year-end chart performance for Heart
Chart (1986)	Position
Canada Top Albums/CDs (RPM)	9
US Billboard 200	2

1988 year-end chart performance for Heart
Chart (1988)	Position
UK Albums (Gallup)	96

=== All-time charts ===
All-time chart performance for Heart
Chart	Position
US Billboard 200	108
US Billboard 200 (Women)	32

== Certifications ==
Certifications for Heart
Region	Certification	Certified units/sales
Canada (Music Canada)	6× Platinum	600,000^{^}
Japan (RIAJ)	Gold	100,000^{^}
United Kingdom (BPI)	Gold	100,000^{^}
United States (RIAA)	5× Platinum	5,000,000^{^}
^{^} Shipments figures based on certification alone.
