= If Looks Could Kill (Heart song) =

Single by Heart

from the album Heart
- B-side: "What He Don't Know"
- Released: 1986
- Genre: Hard rock
- Length: 3:42
- Label: Capitol
- Songwriters: Jack Conrad; Bob Garrett
- Producer: Ron Nevison

Heart singles chronology
"Nothin' at All" (1986)	"If Looks Could Kill" (1986)	"Alone" (1987)

"If Looks Could Kill" is a song written by Jack Conrad and Bob Garrett, originally recorded by Pamala Stanley and later by the American rock band Heart in 1985. Stanley's version was featured in the 1986 Arnold Schwarzenegger film Raw Deal and reached No. 23 on Billboard's Dance Club Songs chart. The Heart version was released as the fifth and final single from the band's self-titled 1985 album, Heart.

After four top-ten US singles (including the number-one "These Dreams") from the Heart album, "If Looks Could Kill" peaked at No. 54 on the US Billboard Hot 100 chart.

Billboard magazine said it's a "hard, fast and very excitable dance song."

The song was recorded by Norwegian actress and singer Mia Gundersen on her record Temptation in 1986. German power metal band Primal Fear included a cover of the song on their 2017 collection Best of Fear.

== Charts ==
=== Pamala Stanley version ===
Chart (1985)	Peak position
US Dance Club Songs (Billboard)	23

=== Heart version ===
Chart (1986)	Peak position
US Billboard Hot 100	54
US Cash Box Top 100	60
