= Dreamboat Annie (song) =

Single by Heart

from the album Dreamboat Annie
- B-side: "Sing Child"
- Released: November 1976 (US)
- Recorded: August 1975
- Genre: Soft rock, folk rock
- Length: 2:59 (Single version)
- Label: Mushroom Records
- Songwriters: Ann Wilson; Nancy Wilson
- Producer: Mike Flicker

Heart singles chronology
"Crazy on You" (1976)	"Dreamboat Annie" (1976)	"Barracuda" (1977)

"Dreamboat Annie" is a song written and recorded by the rock band Heart. It is the title track from their debut album Dreamboat Annie and was released as its third single in 1976. The song had originally appeared as the B-side to Heart's debut single "Crazy on You" earlier that year.

"Dreamboat Annie" became Heart's third U.S. chart entry, peaking at number forty-two on the Billboard Hot 100. Being markedly softer in sound than the other singles Heart had released previously, the song was also Heart's first entry onto the U.S. Adult Contemporary singles chart, where it reached number seventeen (Heart's highest-charting AC hit until "These Dreams" in 1986).

== Versions ==
There are three different versions of the song "Dreamboat Annie" on the Dreamboat Annie album:

Track 2 – "Dreamboat Annie (Fantasy Child)" – 1:10
Track 5 – "Dreamboat Annie" – 2:02
Track 10 – "Dreamboat Annie (Reprise)" – 3:50

The version released on the single, a variation of Track 5, was listed on the 45 as 2:59. Assumed to increase the single's playtime to a more standard 3 minutes, the intro to its A-side "Crazy On You" was grafted onto the beginning of the song. The single version has yet to be released on any Heart album.

In 2011, Nancy Wilson recorded a reworked version of the song with American classical guitarist Sharon Isbin for the latter's album Guitar Passions.

== Reception ==
Cash Box said "the tune is soft and melodic; a banjo plays quickly on backup" and "Ann & Nancy Wilson turn out some surefire harmonies." Billboard described "Dreamboat Annie" as "a pretty and poetic song filled with dreamlike sea lyric imagery and backed by near classical folk guitar and banjo runs." Record World said that it "is not as immediate as 'Crazy On You' or 'Magic Man,' but it has an atmosphere and charm that should captivate listeners."

== Personnel ==
- Ann Wilson – lead vocals
- Nancy Wilson – acoustic guitar, backing vocals
- Steve Fossen – bass guitar
- Howard Leese – bells

Additional musicians

- Tessie Bensussen – backing vocals
- Geoff Foubert – backing vocals
- Jim Hill – backing vocals, banjo
- Kat Hendrikse – drums

== Charts ==
Chart (1977)	Peak position
Canada Top Singles (RPM)	53
Canada Adult Contemporary (RPM)	31
Netherlands (Dutch Single Tip)	18
US Billboard Hot 100	42
US Adult Contemporary (Billboard)	17
US Cash Box Top 100	32
