= Nancy Wilson (rock musician) =

American guitarist (born 1954)

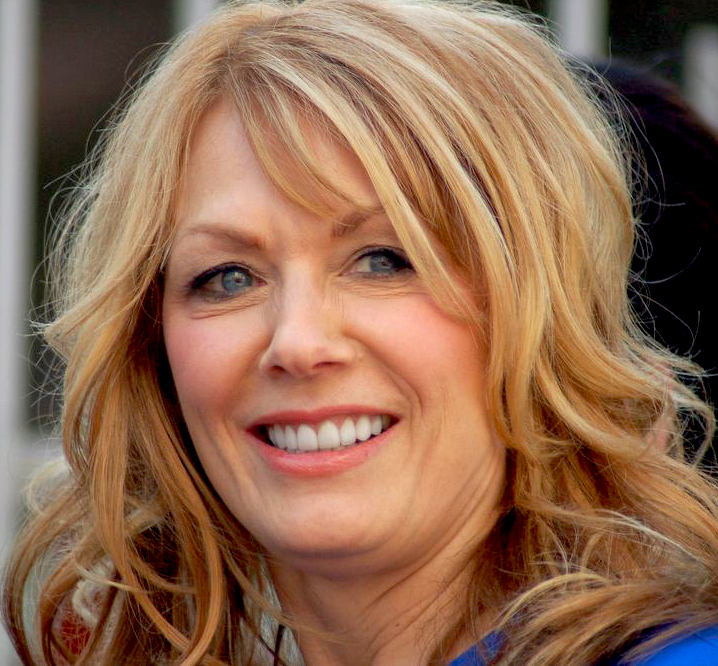
- Wilson in 2012

Background information
- Born: Nancy Lamoureux Wilson; March 16, 1954 (age 72); San Francisco, California, U.S.
- Origin: Seattle, Washington, U.S.
- Genres: Hard rock; folk rock; pop rock; arena rock
- Occupations: Musician; singer; songwriter
- Instruments: Guitar; vocals
- Years active: 1973–present
- Member of: Heart
- Spouses: Cameron Crowe (m. 1986; div. 2010); Geoff Bywater (m. 2012)
- Website: heart-music.com

Nancy Lamoureux Wilson (born March 16, 1954) is an American musician. She rose to fame alongside her older sister Ann Wilson as guitarist and second vocalist in the rock band Heart.

Raised in Bellevue, Washington, Wilson began playing music as a teenager. During college, she joined her sister who had recently become the singer of Heart. Considered the first hard rock band fronted by women to achieve widespread commercial success, Heart released numerous albums throughout the late 1970s and 1980s; the albums Dreamboat Annie (1975) and Little Queen (1977) generated chart singles such as "Magic Man", "Crazy on You", and "Barracuda". The band also had commercial success with their eighth, ninth, and tenth studio albums, Heart, Bad Animals, and Brigade, which were released in 1985, 1987, and 1990 respectively. Heart has sold over 35 million records.

Wilson has been lauded for her guitar playing, noted for blending elements of flamenco and classical guitar styles with hard rock. In 2016, Gibson ranked Wilson the eighth-greatest female guitarist of all time. She is also an accomplished singer in her own right, being the lead vocalist in the song "These Dreams", which became Heart's first number-one single on the Billboard Hot 100. In 2013, Wilson was inducted into the Rock and Roll Hall of Fame as a member of Heart.

== Early life ==
Nancy Wilson was born March 16, 1954, in San Francisco, California, the third and youngest child of John Wilson (d. 2000), and Lois Mary Wilson (née Dustin; d. 2006). She has two older sisters, Lynn and Ann Wilson. Both of Wilson's parents were natives of Oregon—her father from Corvallis, Oregon, and her mother from Oregon City, Oregon. Her middle name is derived from her grandmother, Beatrice Lamoureux. Wilson is of French Canadian and Scottish descent. She was raised in Southern California and Taiwan before the family's United States Marine Corps father retired to the Seattle suburb of Bellevue, Washington, where they relocated when Wilson was six years old. The family lived in a Colonial home in the Lake Hills, Bellevue neighborhood.

On February 9, 1964, Wilson and her sister Ann saw the Beatles perform on The Ed Sullivan Show, a moment they each recalled as being profoundly influential: "The lightning bolt came out of the heavens and struck Ann and me the first time we saw the Beatles on The Ed Sullivan Show... There'd been so much anticipation and hype about the Beatles that it was a huge event, like the lunar landing; that was the moment Ann and I heard the call to become rock musicians. I was seven or eight at the time... right away, we started doing air guitar shows in the living room, faking English accents, and studying all the fanzines." On August 25, 1966, the Beatles performed at the Seattle Center Coliseum, a show which Wilson, her sister Ann, and bandmates attended, another event both recalled as influential in their early lives.

Ann Wilson attended Sammamish High School in Bellevue, where her father was an English teacher, while Nancy attended the newly opened Interlake High School. After graduating in 1972 and prior to joining Heart, Wilson attended Pacific University in Forest Grove, Oregon, for one year, majoring in art and German, then transferred to Portland State University. In late 1973, Wilson returned to the Seattle area and attended the University of Washington.

== Career ==
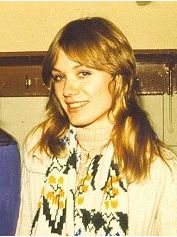
Wilson in the early 1970s

=== Early endeavors ===
Two of the Wilson sisters' friends joined them to form the Wilsons' first music group, the Viewpoints. The Viewpoints were a four-part harmony vocal group. Later that year, Ann purchased her first guitar, a Kent acoustic, with money given to her by her grandmother. Wilson's parents soon bought Nancy a smaller guitar, but since it would not stay in tune, she began playing Ann's Kent guitar. The Viewpoints' first public show was a folk festival on Vashon Island in 1967. In Wilson's words, "We didn't get paid, but since there were people sitting in folding chairs, we considered it a professional gig." The band played at venues such as drive-ins, auto shows, and church socials.

The Wilsons' public debut as a duo took place on Mother's Day at their church. Later at a church Youth Day event, the duo performed "The Great Mandala (The Wheel of Life)" by Peter, Paul and Mary, Elvis Presley's "Crying in the Chapel", and The Doors' "When the Music's Over". The anti-war sentiment, and the irreverence for the venue in some of the lyrics, offended a number of people. By the time they finished, more than half had walked out. Wilson felt some guilt over the event, but "it lit a bonfire under us because we saw for the first time that what we did on stage could have an impact on an audience."

While still a senior in high school, Ann joined a band whose drummer knew a country songwriter in need of a backing band to play on his demos; Wilson and sister Ann entered a recording studio in Seattle to record the demos. During the session, the engineer allowed them to record the song "Through Eyes and Glass", which Nancy and Ann had written. The engineer had his own record label, and liked their songs enough that he offered to make up 500 copies "for a few bucks". Nancy and Ann's first single appeared on the B-side of the country track titled "I'm Gonna Drink My Hurt Away". It was credited to Ann Wilson and the Daybreaks, which was not the name of the band, and it omitted Nancy as co-songwriter. Later, the sisters were returned 250 unsold copies of the record.

=== 1970s ===
During college, Wilson played solo acoustic shows at student unions, performing covers of Joni Mitchell and Paul Simon songs, as well as occasional originals.

Wilson's sister Ann was an acquaintance of guitarist Roger Fisher and bass player Steve Fossen (of the local band The Army) when she answered their advertisement seeking a drummer and a singer. She impressed them with her vocal skills. Within an hour of meeting them, Ann joined the group, which was called Hocus Pocus.

The group shortly reformed as Heart. Pressed by her sister, Nancy joined the band and relocated to West Vancouver. Wilson recalls that "some of the guys" in the band were initially resistant to her joining, and insisted she audition by sitting in periodically. She was given the assignment to work up the introduction to the Yes song "Clap" (from The Yes Album). She learned it, and the next night after playing it with the band at a tavern, was officially made a member of the band.

The band had recorded a demo with Mushroom Records some time before, and producer Mike Flicker remembered them. Flicker saw Nancy as a "diamond in the rough", but was intrigued by the idea of a female rock guitarist.

Mushroom Records released "Magic Man" as a single before Heart's debut album, Dreamboat Annie, had been completed. The song received airplay in and around Vancouver. Portrait Records released the band's second official studio album, Little Queen, in May 1977. The album spawned the track "Barracuda", which reached number 11 on the Billboard charts. The band's third official release, Magazine, was released pre-emptively by Mushroom the following year, and contained eight tracks, some of which had been unfinished; the band sought an injunction and Magazine was recalled after 50,000 copies had already been sold. The dispute over the record lasted nearly two years.

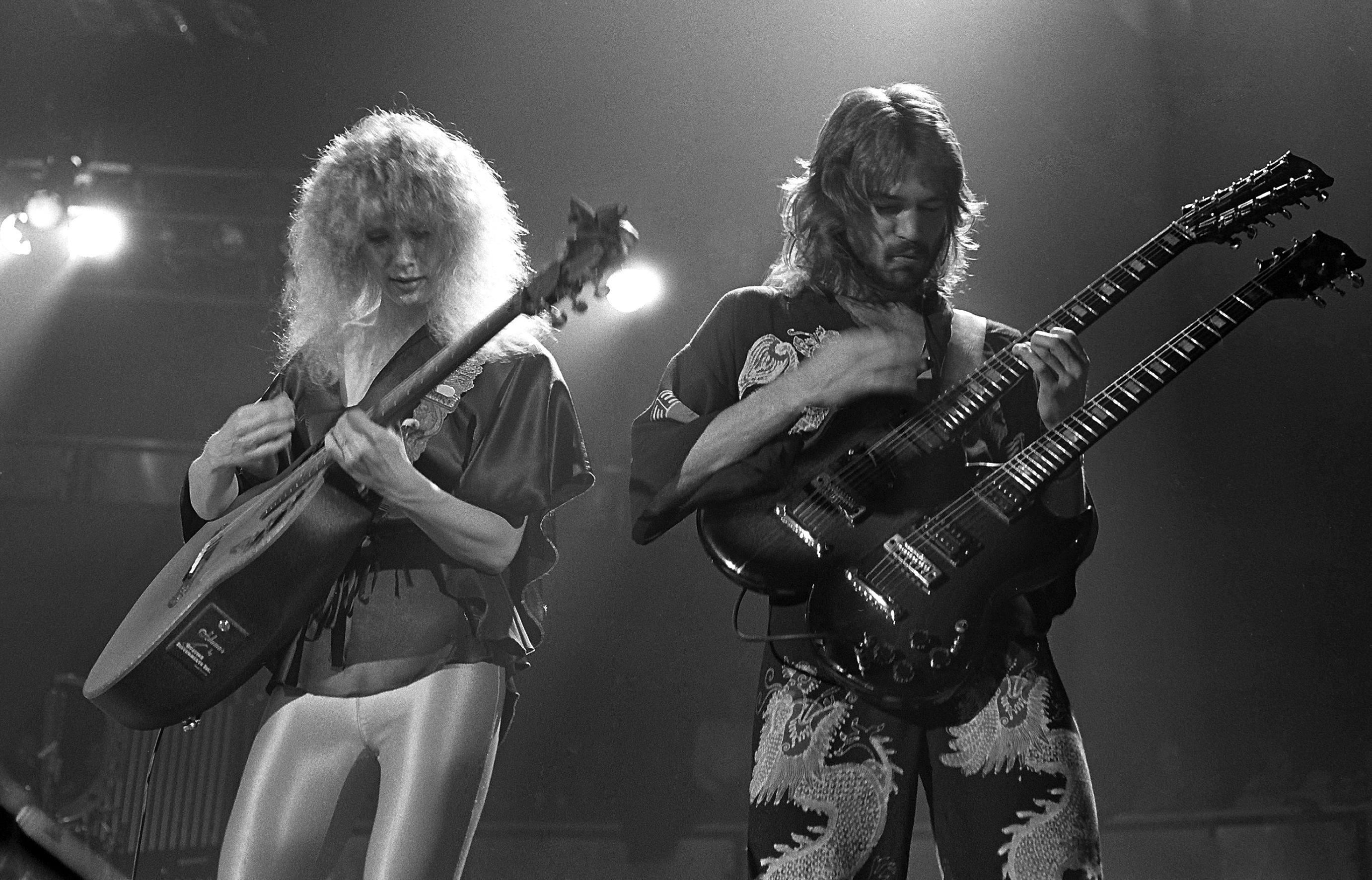
Wilson (left) and Roger Fisher on stage in 1978

Wilson and the group traveled to Berkeley, California, where her friend, Sue Ennis, was studying to receive a PhD at the University of California, Berkeley. Ennis became a writing partner on the group's fourth release, Dog & Butterfly, which they wrote together over the course of a single day. The album was released in October 1978, selling a million copies within the first month. It remained on the album charts for the better part of a year and went on to become a triple-platinum album. It was the band's fourth million-selling album in a row.

During their tour to support Dog & Butterfly, Wilson and Fisher, who were a couple at the time, became estranged. After discovering Fisher had cheated on her, Wilson began dating Michael Derosier. This resulted in tension between the band members, ending with Fisher destroying a guitar onstage and throwing part of it at Wilson in a dressing room. In October 1979, the group voted to oust Fisher from the band; this change allowed Wilson the opportunity to play more lead guitar.

=== 1980s ===
Heart's fifth album, Bébé le Strange, was released on Valentine's Day 1980. The band's sixth album, Private Audition, was released in June 1982 and sold only 400,000 copies; it peaked at number 25 on Billboard. After their series of platinum and gold albums, this was considered a flop. However, Heart continued to do well with concert sales, and had the eighth-highest-grossing tour of the year. During this time, tensions between Wilson and drummer Derosier had increased after several breakups, and both bassist Fossen and he decided to leave the band. Over the next year, they were replaced by bassist Mark Andes and drummer Denny Carmassi.

The lackluster performance of Private Audition led to increased pressure for the band's next album, Passionworks (1983). Drugs became a factor in the band's work during this time. Wilson recalls: "Everything we did in those years had a white sheen of powder over it. There were only a few people on our crew, or band, who resisted. Cocaine was sprinkled over the albums, the videos, and our lives. Cocaine stripped all the humor out of our music. The videos we made were completely without intentional comedy, but were so serious they had an almost comedic feel." After the release of Passionworks, CBS dropped the band due to lackluster sales.

The self-titled Heart (1985) became the band's first number-one album. "What About Love" was released as a single ahead of the album; it became a hit, and crossed over into the pop charts. The album remained on the charts for 78 weeks and went on to be certified five-times platinum. The album had five hit singles, including "These Dreams", a single that featured Nancy Wilson on lead vocals. "These Dreams" had been submitted to the band after Stevie Nicks had turned it down. Though she had not written it, Wilson loved the song from the start. She had to fight to sing it because some band members thought it "did not sound like a Heart song." During the taping session, they received a letter from Sharon Hess, a 22-year-old fan who was dying of leukemia. One of her wishes was to meet Nancy and Ann, and she arrived the same day as the recording of Nancy's vocals for "These Dreams". Sharon loved the song and Wilson dedicated it to her in the album notes. Sharon died just a few days after the final mixes were finished. "These Dreams" became Heart's first number-one single on the Billboard Hot 100 on March 22, 1986.

The album Bad Animals (1987) was preceded by the single "Alone"; it became the band's second number-one hit, and the second-biggest single for the year. This gave them something they had not had with the Heart album: a number-one single before the tour started or the album was released. "We were following on success, not building to it," Wilson recalled. The Bad Animals tour was to start in May 1987 in Europe, and all the dates were sellouts, including three dates at Wembley Arena. During the tour, Ann began to have moments of panic and stage fright. Nancy would have to step forward and play an unscheduled guitar solo, or other ploys, to buy time for Ann to compose herself. Work began on the following album, Brigade, in 1989.

=== 1990s ===
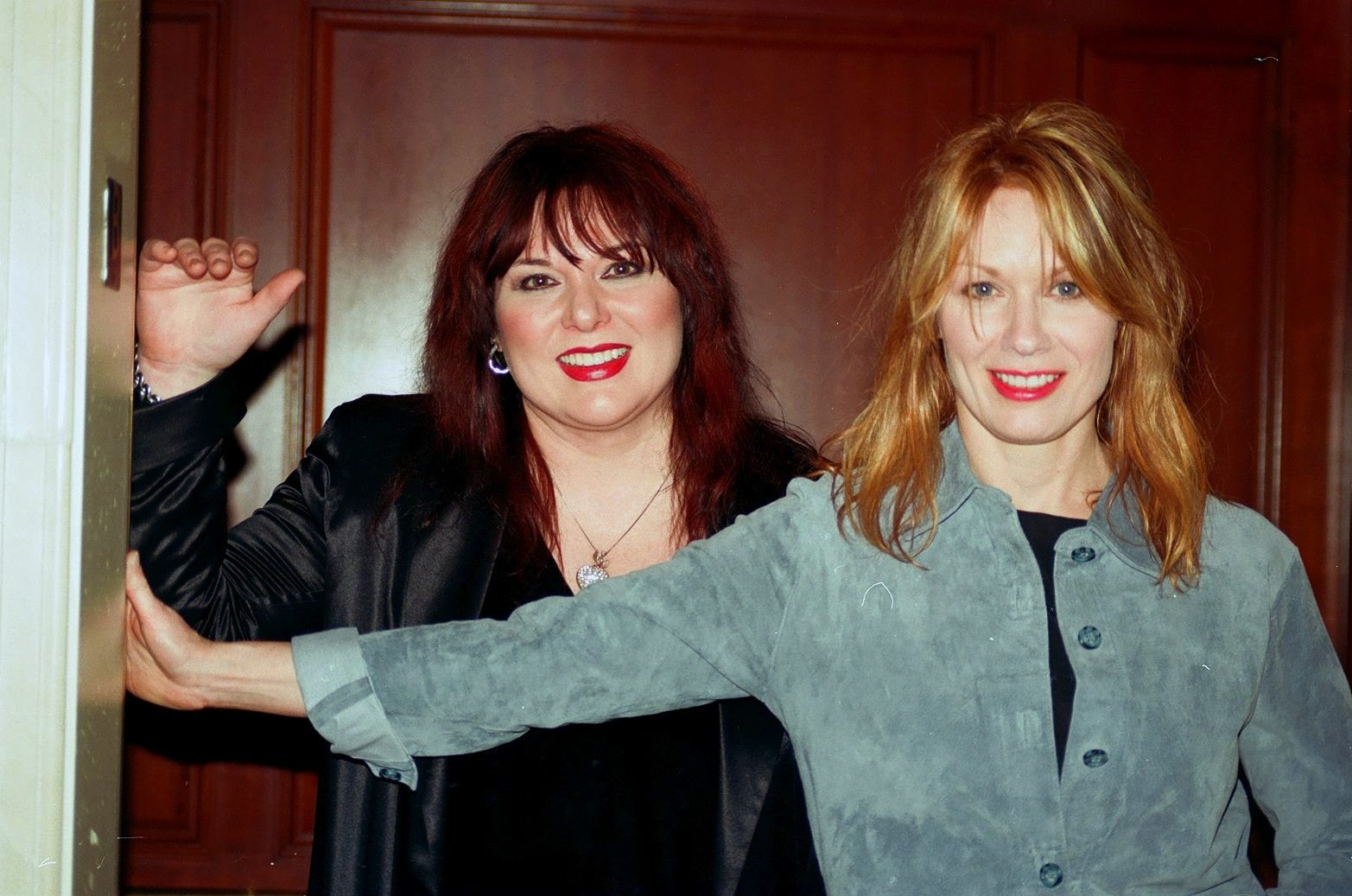
Nancy and her sister Ann in 1998

Around 1990, Wilson and sister Ann were approached to play a Red Cross benefit for the troops during the Gulf War. The promoter wanted Heart to play, but most of the band had been let go after the Brigade tour. Nancy and Ann coaxed Sue Ennis to join and play for the one-time event, along with another friend, Frank Cox. The band's name, Lovemongers, emerged as a counter to war-mongering sentiment surrounding the Gulf War. Since the band lacked a drummer, Ennis programmed a rhythm track into her keyboard and they brought a cardboard cutout of Ringo Starr on stage as a joke. The group played a wrap party for Singles (1992)--a film directed by Wilson's husband, Cameron Crowe—with a local Seattle band called Mookie Blaylock (the band was later renamed Pearl Jam). A four-song EP, which included a live version of Led Zeppelin's "The Battle of Evermore" and an updated version of the Heart standard "Crazy On You", came out in late 1992. A cover of "The Battle of Evermore" also appeared on the original soundtrack for the 1992 film Singles.

In October 1991, Heart released Rock the House Live!, which chronicled songs played on the Brigade tour in 1990. Grunge had taken a firm hold on music by this time, and combined with the lack of big hits the album peaked at only 107 on the Billboard charts.

The album Desire Walks On was released in November 1993 and peaked on Billboard at No. 48. It received gold certification in August 1995.

Heart owed Capitol records one more album. Since their Lovemongers shows had received such a positive response, they decided to record an "unplugged" album. They recruited many rock notables to contribute to the record, titled The Road Home. John Paul Jones of Led Zeppelin served as producer; Layne Staley of Alice in Chains and Chris Cornell of Soundgarden both contributed. The album only reached No. 87 on the U.S. Billboard 200, and the group was dropped by Capitol.

In 1995, Wilson requested that Heart go on hiatus. Wilson explained that she wanted to spend more time working with husband Cameron Crowe on film scores and start a family. At the time, Wilson was 41 and undergoing fertility treatments, which were difficult to schedule around a rock tour and appearances.

Wilson had played "Beautiful Girl in Car" in Crowe's Fast Times at Ridgemont High, then had a small speaking part in The Wild Life. She also contributed some guitar recordings for Crowe's 1989 film Say Anything... and the original song "All For Love". Wilson became more involved in Jerry Maguire, Crowe's new film, and decided that she would write the film score.

During her hiatus from Heart, Wilson was not entirely dormant as a performer; she played the occasional Lovemongers benefit, though she noted that her fertility treatments made performing increasingly difficult. In 1996, Wilson performed her first solo acoustic show in 30 years. Kelly Curtis arranged to have a recording of that show released as an album, Live from McCabe's Guitar Shop, in 1999. The music on the album is a mix of Heart songs, covers (including songs by Peter Gabriel, Joni Mitchell, and Paul Simon), and original new material. In November 1997, Nancy and Ann set out on a 12-date tour traveling by van on what they called the "Don't Blink" tour (joking that, "if you blinked, you missed it.")

The Lovemongers released a full-length album titled Whirlygig in 1997 and a collection of mostly self-penned Christmas songs titled Here is Christmas in 1998. Here is Christmas was re-released as a Heart album with the title Heart Presents a Lovemongers' Christmas in 2001.

For Crowe's 2000 film Almost Famous, Wilson composed the theme and produced two original songs: "Fever Dog" and "Lucky Trumble". She also helped as a technical consultant, coaching the actors on how to look and act like musicians on stage. Wilson was nominated for a Sierra Award for Best Score, a PFCS Award for Best Original Score, and an Anthony Asquith Award for Film Music.

=== 2000s ===
In 2002, Heart embarked on a tour. The tour became a family affair, with four children and their nannies added to the mix of musicians, technical staff, and roadies. It was an eight-week tour and ended what had been a 10-year hiatus from touring for Wilson. The Summer of Love tour concluded in Seattle and that performance was released as the Alive in Seattle DVD, which achieved gold status without an associated album.

Wilson provided the score for the films Vanilla Sky (2001) and Elizabethtown (2005). She was nominated for a Saturn Award for Best Music for her work in Vanilla Sky as well as a Critics Choice Award for Best Composer for Elizabethtown.

The sisters decided to record a new Heart studio album, Jupiters Darling, the first since 1993. Wilson was co-producer, along with guitarist Craig Bartock, who had just joined the band. They wrote all the songs for the album except one. To enhance the guitar parts, Wilson got friends Jerry Cantrell of Alice in Chains and Pearl Jam's Mike McCready to contribute. The album, released by Sovereign Records, charted on the Billboard Top 100, but sold only 100,000 copies.

In 2009, Wilson released Baby Guitars, a solo album aimed at children, composed of instrumental lullabies written and recorded with Craig Bartock. On that same year, after completing a tour with Journey and Cheap Trick, Wilson began recording Heart's 14th studio album, Red Velvet Car, with Ann. The album was released in 2010 and included two singles by Nancy: "Hey You", which reached the top 40 on the Hot Adult Contemporary chart; and "Sunflower", which Nancy wrote for Ann's 60th birthday. The album peaked at number 10 on the Billboard 200 chart and three on the Rock Albums chart. With Nancy now aged 56, and Ann about to become a grandmother, the sisters had managed to have albums make it onto top-10 charts in four different decades. The band's subsequent tour sold out and charted on Billboard just behind those of Lady Gaga and Rihanna.

=== 2010s ===
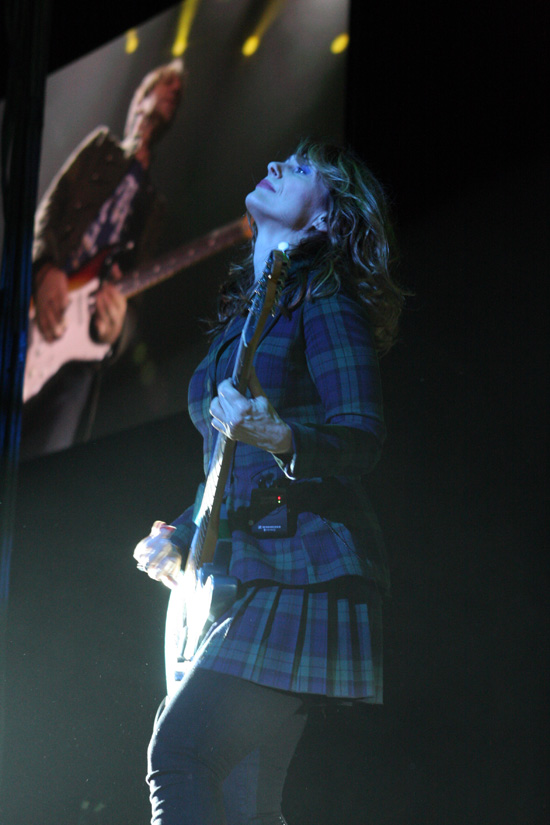
Wilson performing in Sydney in 2011

After completing an international tour with Def Leppard in 2011, Heart was nominated for the Rock and Roll Hall of Fame. On December 11, 2012, Heart was announced to be inducted into the Rock and Roll Hall of Fame as part of the class of 2013, along with Rush, Albert King, Randy Newman, Donna Summer, Public Enemy, Quincy Jones, and Lou Adler. Nancy and Ann also received a star for Heart on the Hollywood Walk of Fame in September 2012.

Heart released its 15th studio album, Fanatic, in October 2012; it debuted at number 24 on the Billboard 200, and hit number 10 on Billboard's Rock Album chart.

Simultaneously, Wilson began assisting in compiling the band's first boxed set, Strange Euphoria (taken from the name of their music publishing company).

In 2016, Heart released their 16th studio album, titled Beautiful Broken, which features Wilson singing lead vocals on the tracks "Two" and "One Word". At an August 26, 2016, show in Auburn, Washington, Wilson's teenaged sons were reportedly assaulted by Ann's husband, Dean Wetter. After the incident, Ann confirmed that Heart was on an "indefinite" hiatus.

In late 2016, Wilson formed a band called Roadcase Royale with former Prince band member and R&B singer Liv Warfield, lead guitarist Ryan Waters (the musical director for Liv's solo work and Prince protégé), Heart keyboardist Chris Joyner, bassist Dan Rothchild, and drummer Ben Smith. They released their first single, "Get Loud", in January 2017. The band signed with Loud and Proud Records in July 2017 and released their debut full-length album First Things First on September 22, 2017.

In February 2019, Heart announced that its hiatus had ended and that the band would embark on the Love Alive tour in the summer of 2019.

=== 2020s ===
In 2021, she released her first solo studio rock album, You and Me. In 2022, she started touring under the name Nancy Wilson's Heart, which includes singer Kimberly Nichole, who was a finalist on Season 8 of The Voice, and former Heart members Ryan Waters (guitars), Ben Smith (drums), Andy Stoller (bass) and Dan Walker (keyboards).

== Personal life ==
Wilson dated bandmates Roger Fisher and Michael Derosier during the early years of Heart. In 1981, Wilson's friend Kelly Curtis introduced her to screenwriter Cameron Crowe; Wilson married him on July 27, 1986. After numerous failed fertility treatments, Wilson and Crowe conceived via an egg donor and surrogate, and the surrogate gave birth to twin sons in January 2000. The marriage ended in divorce in 2010, with the couple citing irreconcilable differences.

In 2011, Wilson began dating Geoff Bywater, who worked in music production on television shows for Fox. They were engaged in 2012 and married on April 28, 2012, in Mill Valley, California.

On the morning of August 27, 2016, Ann Wilson's husband, Dean Wetter, was arrested for physically assaulting Nancy Wilson's 16-year-old twin sons. The incident took place during a Heart performance at the White River Amphitheater in Auburn, Washington, the previous night. The sisters' relationship was strained by the incident. Wetter pleaded guilty to two non-felony assault charges in the fourth degree. Nancy Wilson later commented: "I'm an eternal optimist because I'm from a really strong, tight family, and I don't think any drama that's temporary is going to change our strong relationship. We just have to get through this first. It's been kind of a nightmare." In February 2019, Heart announced that its hiatus had ended and that the band would embark on the Love Alive tour that summer.

== Discography ==
=== Film soundtracks ===
Year	Film	Song	Notes
1986	The Golden Child	"The Best Man in the World"	Lyricist; co-written with Ann Wilson and Sue Ennis

=== Studio albums ===
Year	Title
2005	Elizabethtown
2009	Baby Guitars
2016	Undercover Guitar (with Julie Bergman)
2021	You and Me

=== Other appearances ===
Year	Title	Album
1989	"All for Love"	Say Anything...
1989	"Bring a Torch, Jeanette, Isabella"	Christmas Guitars
1996	"We Meet Again (Theme from Jerry Maguire)" and "Sandy"	Jerry Maguire
2000	"Lucky Trumble"	Almost Famous
2001	"Elevator Beat"	Vanilla Sky
2005	"Oh Yeah"	Songs for the Ride Home

=== Live albums ===
Year	Title
1999	Live at McCabe's Guitar Shop

=== DVDs ===
Nancy Wilson: Instructional Acoustic Guitar (2007, DVD)

== Accolades ==
Awards

- 1997: American Society of Composers, Authors and Publishers (ASCAP Award – Top Box Office Films) for Jerry Maguire
- 2012: Star on the Walk of Fame (Recording) – shared with Ann
- 2013: Inducted into the Rock and Roll Hall of Fame as a member of Heart

Nominations

- 2000: Las Vegas Film Critics Society Awards (Sierra Award – Best Score) for Almost Famous
- 2001: Phoenix Film Critics Society Awards (PFCS Award – Best Original Score) for Almost Famous
- 2001: BAFTA (Anthony Asquith Award for Film Music) for Almost Famous
- 2002: Academy of Science Fiction, Fantasy & Horror Films, USA (Saturn Award – Best Music) for Vanilla Sky
- 2006: Broadcast Film Critics Association Awards (Critics Choice Award – Best Composer) for Elizabethtown

== See also ==
- Heart discography

== Sources ==
- Prown, Peter; Newquist, Harvey P. (1997). Eiche, John F. (ed.). Legends of Rock Guitar: The Essential Reference of Rock's Greatest Guitarists. Hal Leonard Corporation. ISBN 978-0-793-54042-6.
- Wilson, Ann; Wilson, Nancy; Cross, Charles (2013). Kicking & Dreaming: A Story of Heart, Soul, and Rock & Roll. New York: HarperCollins. ISBN 978-0-06-210167-9.
