= These Dreams =

1986 single by Heart

Single by Heart

from the album Heart
- B-side: "All Eyes"
- Released: 1986
- Studio: The Plant (Sausalito, California)
- Genre: Rock; synth-pop
- Length: 4:15 (album version); 3:46 (single and video version)
- Label: Capitol
- Songwriters: Bernie Taupin; Martin Page
- Producer: Ron Nevison

Heart singles chronology
"Never" (1985)	"These Dreams" (1986)	"Nothin' at All" (1986)

"These Dreams" is a song by American rock band Heart from their 1985 self-titled eighth studio album. It was written by Bernie Taupin and Martin Page and released in 1986, as the album's third single, becoming the band's first song to reach number one on the US Billboard Hot 100. The single's B-side song "Shell Shock" (on some releases) was also the B-side of the band's previous single "Never".

== Background ==
In 1985, singer-songwriter Martin Page, who co-wrote Starship's "We Built This City", and Bernie Taupin, longtime collaborator of Elton John, wrote a song which would later be titled "These Dreams". Page envisaged the track as an "electric hymn" in the style of Orchestral Manoeuvres in the Dark. The song was offered to Stevie Nicks, who expressed no interest in recording it. Heart had just recently signed with Capitol Records, and while the band previously recorded their own material, they were impressed by "These Dreams" and agreed to use the song on their upcoming album Heart.

The track is a power ballad with a more polished sound in comparison to Heart's previous work and was the band's first single on which Nancy Wilson performed lead vocals instead of Ann Wilson. According to The Billboard Book of Number One Hits by Fred Bronson, when it came time for Nancy Wilson to record her vocals, she was suffering from a cold and sounded somewhat raspy and gravelly. After the song reached commercial success, producers reportedly wanted Wilson to recreate the vocal style on future recordings, asking her: "Can't you just get sick again?"

== Composition ==
The liner notes of Heart state that the track was dedicated to Wilson's good friend Sharon Hess, who died from leukemia shortly before it was released. The lyrics of the track describe the fantasy world a woman enters, every time she sleeps, when faced with a difficult situation in life.

The anthemic chorus of the song is performed in the key of B major with a tempo of approximately 79 beats per minute. The verses are in G-sharp minor, modulating into the relative major for the chorus.

== Reception ==
Cash Box called it "a tender, forlorn song which features a rare lead vocal appearance by Nancy [Wilson]." In a 2002 review for All Music Guide, Stephen Thomas Erlewine regarded "These Dreams" as "good mid-'80s mainstream material".

== Commercial performance ==
The track was released as the third single from Heart. Following two consecutive US top 10 singles, it elevated the band's success, becoming Heart's first single to reach number one on the Billboard Hot 100 on March 22, 1986. It also became Heart's first and only number-one song on the US Adult Contemporary chart. In the United Kingdom, the single initially peaked at number 62 on the UK Singles Chart, but, following the success of the band's 1987 single "Alone" in the country, the song was re-released in 1988 as a double A-side with "Never", and reached a new peak of number 8.

== In popular culture ==
In the opening scene of the fifth episode of season two of Canadian television series Mr. D, the eponymous Gerry Dee is slowly driving through a quiet residential area when he raises the volume as 'These Dreams' by Heart plays on his car radio. He tearfully sings along as he drives, becoming increasingly emotional with each stanza to the point of briefly losing situational awareness when he unexpectedly collides with the rear bumper of a parked police cruiser.

== Music video ==
A music video was made for the song, recorded via Capitol Records and directed by Jeff Stein. The clip for the track, which used the single version instead of the album version, received heavy airplay from MTV and was the third of four US Top 10 singles from Heart. This version (slightly shorter) does not have the second strophe of the original verses.

In the video, Nancy Wilson sings as she looks out over a pool of water and plays guitar in other sequences. Ann Wilson sings with her from shadow and the other band members have brief appearances performing the song. Wilson plays a Dean guitar as well as a petite sail-shaped electric guitar, created by luthier David Petschulat.

== Charts ==
=== Weekly charts ===
Weekly chart performance for "These Dreams"
Chart (1986)	Peak position
Australia (Kent Music Report)	27
Canada Top Singles (RPM)	6
Canada Adult Contemporary (RPM)	1
Canada (The Record)	10
Finland (Suomen virallinen lista)	23
Ireland (IRMA)	30
Netherlands (Dutch Top 40)	39
Netherlands (Single Top 100)	38
UK Singles (Official Charts)	62
US Billboard Hot 100	1
US Adult Contemporary (Billboard)	1
US Mainstream Rock (Billboard)	2
US Cash Box Top 100 Singles	1

Weekly chart performance for "Never"/"These Dreams"
Chart (1988)	Peak position
Europe (Eurochart Hot 100 Singles)	34
Ireland (IRMA)	10
UK Singles (Official Charts)	8

=== Year-end charts ===
Year-end chart performance for "These Dreams"
Chart (1986)	Position
Canada Top Singles (RPM)	60
US Billboard Hot 100	33
US Adult Contemporary (Billboard)	8
US Cash Box Top 100 Singles	8

== Certifications ==
Region	Certification	Certified units/sales
New Zealand (RMNZ)	Gold	15,000^{‡}
^{‡} Sales+streaming figures based on certification alone.
