= Sue Ennis =

American songwriter

- Born: Seattle, Washington, U.S.
- Education: Willamette University (BA); University of California, Berkeley (MA)
- Occupations: Songwriter, music educator
- Years active: 1970s–present
- Organization: Recording Academy
- Known for: Co-writing songs with Heart, including "Straight On", "Even It Up", and "Dog & Butterfly"
- Notable work: Straight On; Even It Up; Dog & Butterfly; The Best Man in the World; Shining Time

Sue Ennis is a songwriter from Seattle, Washington. She has co-written over 200 songs with Ann Wilson and Nancy Wilson of the band Heart. Ennis has taught classes on songwriting and the music business at Shoreline Community College, and has served four terms as Trustee of the Pacific Northwest Chapter of the Recording Academy.

== Career ==
Ennis' songwriting with Heart includes "Straight On", "Even It Up" and "Dog & Butterfly", and she has been a member of and co-writer for the band The Lovemongers with the Wilsons and Frank Cox.

Known for her versatility and genre-jumping as a songwriter, she has co-written music as part of other works: with John Barry and Ann and Nancy Wilson, Ennis co-wrote "The Best Man in the World" from the 1986 film The Golden Child. She has co-written songs with Hummie Mann, including "Shining Time" from the 2000 movie Thomas and the Magic Railroad. They also wrote an ad jingle for "State Roofing" which won a "Soundie Award" for best commercial of the year in the PNW. She wrote the song for "The Great Fire", a permanent installation in Seattle's Museum of History and Industry, and wrote the score and songs for the 2019 children's musical Art Dog at the Seattle Children's Theatre.

Ennis teaches classes on songwriting and the music business at Shoreline Community College and has served four terms as Trustee of the Pacific Northwest Chapter of the Recording Academy. She sat on the Seattle Music Commission in the Office of Arts and Culture which oversees music advocacy for the PNW music community; she was reappointed in 2021. Terming out as President of the PNW chapter of the Recording Academy, she was recently re-elected by the board as a national trustee for the upcoming term (2025-29). She also serves on the Leadership Council for the Songwriters and Composers Wing of the Recording Academy.

Three of her songs ("You and Me", "I'll Find You", "Walk Away") appear on You and Me (2021) the first solo record by Heart's Nancy Wilson. Their recent songwriting collaboration, a Million Goodbyes, features Nancy in a duet with Ben Gibbard (Death Cab for Cutie). She also co-wrote 5 songs on the upcoming Heart album. (Release: 2027)

Ennis has B.A. degrees in English and German from Willamette University and a M.A. in German Literature from the University of California, Berkeley.
