= Strange Euphoria =

Box set by Heart
- Released: June 5, 2012
- Recorded: 1969–2012
- Genre: Hard rock, folk rock, pop rock
- Length: 3:19:20
- Label: Epic/Legacy
- Producer: Ann Wilson, Nancy Wilson, Sue Wood and Al Quaglieri

Heart chronology
Red Velvet Car (2010)	Strange Euphoria (2012)	Fanatic (2012)

Professional ratings
Review scores
Source	Rating
AllMusic	4/5 stars

Strange Euphoria is a career-spanning box set album by Heart. The three-CD compilation features several of their hit songs as well as songs by The Lovemongers, solo songs by Ann Wilson and Nancy Wilson, a recording by the pre-Heart group Ann Wilson & The Daybreaks that goes back to 1968, and previously unreleased demos and live tracks. A DVD is also included featuring a 1976 concert at Washington State University for the Pullman, Washington-based KWSU-TV concert series The Second Ending in promotion for their debut album Dreamboat Annie.

The Amazon.com exclusive version was released with a bonus CD containing covers of five Led Zeppelin songs, entitled Heart Zeppish. As of July 2017, the bonus disc is no longer available.

== Track listing ==
Disc one
No.	Title	Writer(s)	Original album	Length
1.	"Through Eyes & Glass" (by Ann Wilson & The Daybreaks)	Ann Wilson, Nancy Wilson	Non-album single (1969)	3:16
2.	"Magic Man" (demo; previously unreleased)	A. Wilson, N. Wilson	Dreamboat Annie (1975)	3:12
3.	"How Deep It Goes" (demo; previously unreleased)	A. Wilson	Dreamboat Annie	4:42
4.	"Crazy on You" (demo; previously unreleased)	A. Wilson, N. Wilson, Roger Fisher	Dreamboat Annie	4:49
5.	"Dreamboat Annie (Fantasy Child) + Dreamboat Annie Reprise" (edit; previously unreleased)	A. Wilson, N. Wilson	Dreamboat Annie	3:12
6.	"Love Alive"	A. Wilson, N. Wilson, Fisher	Little Queen (1977)	4:18
7.	"Sylvan Song"	N. Wilson, Fisher	Little Queen	2:14
8.	"Dream of the Archer"	A. Wilson, N. Wilson, Fisher	Little Queen	4:31
9.	"White Lightning & Wine" (live at the Aquarius Tavern in Seattle, Washington, June 1, 1976; previously unreleased)	A. Wilson, N. Wilson	Dreamboat Annie	6:01
10.	"Barracuda" (live at the Universal Amphitheatre in Los Angeles, California, July 15, 1977; broadcast on BBC Radio's London Wavelenghth Concert Hour, October 1, 1978; previously unreleased)	A. Wilson, N. Wilson, Fisher, Michael DeRosier	Little Queen	4:37
11.	"Little Queen"	A. Wilson, N. Wilson, Fisher, Steve Fossen, Howard Leese, DeRosier	Little Queen	5:12
12.	"Kick It Out"	A. Wilson	Little Queen	2:44
13.	"Here Song" (demo; previously unreleased)	A. Wilson	Magazine (1977)	1:34
14.	"Heartless" (demo; previously unreleased)	A. Wilson, N. Wilson	Magazine	4:53
15.	"Dog & Butterfly" (acoustic demo; previously unreleased)	A. Wilson, N. Wilson, Sue Ennis	Dog & Butterfly (1978)	4:57
16.	"Straight On"	A. Wilson, N. Wilson, Ennis	Dog & Butterfly	5:06
17.	"Nada One"	A. Wilson, N. Wilson, Ennis	Dog & Butterfly	5:21

Disc two
No.	Title	Writer(s)	Original album	Length
1.	"Bebe le Strange"	A. Wilson, Ennis, N. Wilson, Fisher	Bébé le Strange (1980)	3:39
2.	"Silver Wheels II"	N. Wilson	Bébé le Strange	1:22
3.	"Even It Up"	A. Wilson, Ennis, N. Wilson	Bébé le Strange	5:10
4.	"Sweet Darlin'"	A. Wilson	Bébé le Strange	3:17
5.	"City's Burning"	A. Wilson, Ennis, N. Wilson	Private Audition (1982)	4:23
6.	"Angels"	A. Wilson, Ennis	Private Audition	2:59
7.	"Love Mistake"	N. Wilson	Passionworks (1983)	3:25
8.	"Lucky Day" (demo)	A. Wilson, N. Wilson, Lisa Dalbello	Previously unreleased	3:29
9.	"Never" (with John Paul Jones; previously unreleased)	Holly Knight, Greg Bloch, Connie	Heart (1985)	4:08
10.	"These Dreams"	Martin Page, Bernie Taupin	Heart	4:12
11.	"Nobody Home"	A. Wilson, N. Wilson, Ennis	Heart	4:07
12.	"Alone"	Tom Kelly, Billy Steinberg	Bad Animals (1987)	3:38
13.	"Wait for an Answer"	Dalbello	Bad Animals	4:28
14.	"Unconditional Love" (demo; recorded in 1986)	A. Wilson, N. Wilson, Ennis	Previously unreleased	4:32
15.	"High Romance" (demo; recorded in 1986)	N. Wilson, Ennis, A. Wilson	Previously unreleased	3:20
16.	"Under the Sky" (demo; previously unreleased)	A. Wilson, N. Wilson, Ennis	Brigade (1990)	2:50
17.	"Desire Walks On" ("Beach demo" version; previously unreleased)	N. Wilson, Ennis, A. Wilson	Desire Walks On (1993)	4:18

Disc three
No.	Title	Writer(s)	Original album	Length
1.	"Kiss" (by The Lovemongers)	A. Wilson, Ennis, N. Wilson	Whirlygig (1997)	5:05
2.	"Sand" (by The Lovemongers)	A. Wilson, N. Wilson, Ennis, Frank Cox	Whirlygig	4:33
3.	"Everything" (by Nancy Wilson) (live)	N. Wilson	Live from McCabe's Guitar Shop (1999)	4:44
4.	"She Still Believes" (live at the Saratoga Mountain Winery California from the Ann and Nancy Live Tour, August 18, 1999)	A. Wilson, N. Wilson, Ennis	Previously unreleased	3:38
5.	"Any Woman's Blues" (demo) (with the Seattle Blues Revue Horns)	A. Wilson, N. Wilson, Ennis	Previously unreleased	3:59
6.	"Strange Euphoria"	A. Wilson, N. Wilson, Ennis	Greatest Hits/Live (1980)	2:43
7.	"Boppy's Back" (demo; recorded in 1993)	A. Wilson, N. Wilson	Previously unreleased	2:07
8.	"Friend Meets Friend" (by The Lovemongers) (live from The Backstage, Seattle, Washington, September 1997)	A. Wilson, N. Wilson, Ennis	Previously unreleased	2:53
9.	"Love or Madness" (live at the Saratoga Mountain Winery California from the Ann and Nancy Live Tour, August 18, 1999)	A. Wilson, N. Wilson	Previously unreleased	2:48
10.	"Skin to Skin"	A. Wilson, N. Wilson	Previously unreleased	4:20
11.	"Fallen Ones"	N. Wilson, A. Wilson, Craig Bartock	Jupiters Darling (2004)	3:41
12.	"Enough"	Bartock, A. Wilson	Jupiters Darling	3:24
13.	"Lost Angel" (live at the Trump Taj Majal, Atlantic City, New Jersey; for the VH1 Classic Decades Rock Live! special recorded on March 10, 2006)	N. Wilson	Previously unreleased; later released on Live in Atlantic City (2019)	6:50
14.	"Little Problems, Little Lies" (by Ann Wilson)	Ben Mink, A. Wilson	Hope & Glory (2007)	3:29
15.	"Queen City"	A. Wilson, N. Wilson, Bartock, Mink	Red Velvet Car (2010)	4:12
16.	"Hey You"	N. Wilson, Mink	Red Velvet Car	4:11
17.	"Avalon (Reprise)"	A. Wilson, N. Wilson, K. Grindstaff	Desire Walks On	0:34

Disc four (DVD) – The Second Ending circa February–March 1976 for KWSU-TV
No.	Title	Writer(s)	Length
1.	"Pre Show"	A. Wilson, N. Wilson, R. Fisher, Fossen, John Hannah, DeRosier, Michael Fisher
2.	"Heartless"	A. Wilson, N. Wilson
3.	"White Lightning & Wine"	A. Wilson, N. Wilson
4.	"Dreamboat Annie"	A. Wilson, N. Wilson
5.	"Silver Wheels"	N. Wilson
6.	"Crazy on You"	A. Wilson, N. Wilson, R. Fisher
7.	"Sing Child"	A. Wilson, R. Fisher, Fossen
8.	"Soul of the Sea"	A. Wilson, N. Wilson
9.	"Devil Delight"	A. Wilson, N. Wilson
10.	"Magic Man"	A. Wilson, N. Wilson

Amazon.com exclusive bonus disc – Heart Zeppish
No.	Title	Writer(s)	Original album	Length
1.	"Going to California" (live)	Jimmy Page, Robert Plant	Previously unreleased	4:08
2.	"The Battle of Evermore" (by The Lovemongers) (live)	Page, Plant	The Bridge School Concerts, Vol. 1 (1997)	5:43
3.	"What Is and What Should Never Be" (with John Paul Jones) (demo)	Page, Plant	Previously unreleased	4:57
4.	"Immigrant Song" (by Ann Wilson)	Page, Plant	Hope & Glory	3:42
5.	"Misty Mountain Hop" (live)	Jones, Page, Plant	Dreamboat Annie Live (2007)	5:00
