= Greatest Hits/Live =

Compilation album of greatest hits and live recordings by Heart
- Released: November 29, 1980
- Recorded: August–September 1980 (Note: Live recordings); September 1980 (Note: New tracks)
- Studios: Kaye-Smith, Seattle, Washington
- Genres: Hard rock; folk rock
- Length: 77:44 (vinyl); 69:01 (CD)
- Label: Epic
- Producers: Heart; Mike Flicker; Connie (Note: Connie is a pseudonym for Nancy Wilson, Sue Ennis, and Ann Wilson.); Howie

Heart chronology
Bébé le Strange (1980)	Greatest Hits/Live (1980)	Private Audition (1982)

Singles from Greatest Hits/Live
- 1. "Tell It Like It Is" Released: November 1980; 2. "Unchained Melody (live)" Released: March 1981

Professional ratings
Review scores
Source	Rating
AllMusic	4.5/5 stars
Robert Christgau	C+
The Rolling Stone Album Guide	3/5 stars

Greatest Hits/Live is a compilation album of greatest hits, live recordings and new tracks by American rock band Heart, released on November 29, 1980, by Epic Records. The album was issued in North America as a double LP. The first disc is a collection of the band's greatest hits, while the second is mostly a live album, although it contains three previously unreleased studio recordings, including a cover of "Tell It Like It Is", released as the first single. The second single released from the album was a live cover of "Unchained Melody".

The songs "Hit Single", "Strange Euphoria", and "Unchained Melody" were omitted from the CD version of the album, due to initial limitations in CD technology. "Unchained Melody" would later resurface on several compilations, while "Hit Single" and "Strange Euphoria" would only become available on the limited three-disc edition of The Essential Heart in 2009. "Strange Euphoria" also appears on the 2012 box set of the same name.

Greatest Hits/Live reached number 13 on the US Billboard 200 chart and has been certified double platinum by the Recording Industry Association of America (RIAA).

In Europe, the album was released as a single disc with 10 songs. In 1999, Sony Music re-released this version with different artwork under the title Simply the Best, as part of their budget series of the same name.

== Track listing ==
Side one
No.	Title	Writer(s)	Original album	Length
1.	"Barracuda"	Ann Wilson; Roger Fisher; Nancy Wilson; Michael DeRosier	Little Queen (1977)	4:21
2.	"Silver Wheels"	N. Wilson	Bébé le Strange (1980)	1:19
3.	"Crazy on You"	A. Wilson; N. Wilson	Dreamboat Annie (1975)	4:54
4.	"Straight On"	A. Wilson; N. Wilson; Sue Ennis	Dog & Butterfly (1978)	4:52
5.	"Dreamboat Annie"	A. Wilson; N. Wilson	Dreamboat Annie	2:08

Side two
No.	Title	Writer(s)	Original album	Length
6.	"Even It Up"	A. Wilson; Ennis; N. Wilson	Bébé le Strange	5:09
7.	"Magic Man"	A. Wilson; N. Wilson	Dreamboat Annie	5:27
8.	"Heartless"	A. Wilson; N. Wilson	Magazine (1977)	5:00
9.	"Dog & Butterfly"	A. Wilson; N. Wilson; Ennis	Dog & Butterfly	5:20

Side three
No.	Title	Writer(s)	Venue	Length
10.	"Bebe le Strange" (live)	A. Wilson; Ennis; N. Wilson; Fisher	The Forum, Los Angeles, August 1980	4:21
11.	"Tell It Like It Is"	George Davis; Lee Diamond	Studio track	4:29
12.	"Mistral Wind" (live)	A. Wilson; N. Wilson; Ennis; Fisher	The Coliseum, Phoenix, Arizona, August 1980	7:13
13.	"Hit Single" (omitted from CD)	A. Wilson; Ennis; N. Wilson; Howard Leese	Studio track	2:34
14.	"Strange Euphoria" (omitted from CD)	A. Wilson; Ennis; N. Wilson	Studio track	2:44

Side four
No.	Title	Writer(s)	Venue	Length
15.	"Sweet Darlin" (live)	A. Wilson	Aladdin Theater, Las Vegas, August 1980	4:04
16.	"I'm Down / Long Tall Sally" (live)	John Lennon; Paul McCartney / Enotris Johnson; Robert Blackwell; Richard Penniman	Sports Arena, San Diego, August 1980	4:07
17.	"Unchained Melody" (live; omitted from CD)	Hy Zaret; Alex North	McNichols Arena, Denver, September 1980	4:30
18.	"Rock and Roll" (live)	Jimmy Page; Robert Plant; John Paul Jones; John Bonham	The Coliseum, Seattle, August 1980	5:12
Total length:				77:44

=== European edition (Simply the Best) ===
No.	Title	Writer(s)	Length
1.	"Tell It Like It Is"	Davis; Diamond	4:30
2.	"Barracuda"	A. Wilson; Fisher; N. Wilson; DeRosier	4:22
3.	"Straight On"	A. Wilson; N. Wilson; Ennis	4:52
4.	"Dog & Butterfly"	A. Wilson; N. Wilson; Ennis	5:20
5.	"Even It Up"	A. Wilson; Ennis; N. Wilson	5:09
6.	"Bebe le Strange" (live)	A. Wilson; Ennis; N. Wilson; Fisher	4:21
7.	"Sweet Darlin" (live)	A. Wilson	4:11
8.	"I'm Down / Long Tall Sally" (live)	Lennon; McCartney / Johnson; Blackwell; Penniman	4:16
9.	"Unchained Melody" (live)	Zaret; North	4:30
10.	"Rock and Roll" (live)	Page; Plant; Jones; Bonham	5:56
Total length:			47:27

== Personnel ==
Credits adapted from the liner notes of Greatest Hits/Live.

=== Heart ===
- Howard Leese
- Steve Fossen
- Ann Wilson
- Michael DeRosier
- Nancy Wilson

=== Additional musicians ===
- Lenny Pickett, Greg Adams, Emilio Castillo, Steven Kupka, Mic Gillette – horns ("Tell It Like It Is" and "Even It Up")

=== Technical ===
- Heart – production (all live recordings, "Tell It Like It Is", "Strange Euphoria" and songs from Dog & Butterfly)
- Mike Flicker – production (songs from Bébé le Strange, Dog & Butterfly, Dreamboat Annie, Little Queen and Magazine); engineering (sides one and two)
- Connie – production (songs from Bébé le Strange)
- Howie – production (songs from Bébé le Strange)
- Rob Perkins – engineering (sides three and four)
- Brian Foraker – engineering (sides three and four)
- Mike Beiriger – engineering (live recordings)
- John Golden – mastering

=== Artwork ===
- Neal Preston – front and back cover photography

== Charts ==
=== Weekly charts ===
Weekly chart performance for Greatest Hits/Live
Chart (1980–1981)	Peak position
Australian Albums (Kent Music Report)	25
Canada Top Albums/CDs (RPM)	18
US Billboard 200	13

=== Year-end charts ===
Year-end chart performance for Greatest Hits/Live
Chart (1981)	Position
Canada Top Albums/CDs (RPM)	72
US Billboard 200	84

== Certifications ==
Certifications for Greatest Hits/Live
Region	Certification	Certified units/sales
United States (RIAA)	2× Platinum	2,000,000^{^}
^{^} Shipments figures based on certification alone.
