= City's Burning =

Song by Heart

from the album Private Audition
- Released: 1982
- Genre: Rock
- Length: 4:25
- Label: Epic
- Songwriter(s): Ann Wilson; Nancy Wilson; Sue Ennis
- Producer(s): Ann Wilson; Nancy Wilson; Sue Ennis; Howard Leese

Music video
- "City's Burning" on YouTube

"City's Burning" is a song by the American rock band Heart, which was released in 1982 as the opening track on their sixth studio album Private Audition. It was written by Ann Wilson, Nancy Wilson, Sue Ennis, and produced by the Wilsons, Ennis and Howard Leese. The song reached No. 15 on the US Billboard Rock Albums & Top Tracks chart. A music video was filmed to promote the song. The song was re-recorded for the band's sixteenth studio album, Beautiful Broken, released in 2016.

== Background ==
"City's Burning" was inspired by the 1980 murder of John Lennon. In a 1985 interview with Bob Andelman, Ann Wilson revealed: "It was a story we made up. A couple – they get the news about John on the radio or TV, and it tells about each of their reactions."

== Reception ==
Upon release Billboard noted Ann Wilson's vocals on the song, describing them as having a "Plant-like rasp". Joe Konz of The Indianapolis Star wrote: ""City's Burning" promises to be one of the most powerful songs of the year. Its deficient lyrical clout is more than offset by an instrumental tour de force, a ravaging display of heavy metal rock. Equipped with the same harsh phrasing, shrill vocals and heavy-metal guitar licks that powered the hits "Magic Man" and "Barracuda", "City's Burning" runs roughshod over everything else on the band's new LP."

Eric Davis of The Marion Star described the song as one of the album's "loud ones that should satisfy the power bugs". He added: "It's an improvement over previous power jettings by the band, as it includes an interesting tempo and mood change midway through, followed by a wailing, but soulful, lead guitar solo." Mike Diana of Daily Press commented: ""City's Burning" is the only all-out rocker on the album, and even though it pales before what other female rockers have been doing of late, the cut gets the album off with a bang." In a review of one of the band's 1982 concerts, Larry Rhodes of the Daily Press described the song as a "heavy metal screamer about crime-ridden, chaotic city life".

In a retrospective review of the album, Jim Smith of AllMusic stated: "Private Audition starts tough with "City's Burning," possibly the band's most underrated song, but it's dragged down by the trite songwriting that follows."

== Charts ==
Chart (1982)	Peak position
US Billboard Top Rock Tracks	15

== Personnel ==
Heart

- Ann Wilson – lead vocals
- Nancy Wilson – acoustic guitar, backing vocals
- Howard Leese – electric guitar, synthesizer, Moog drum
- Steve Fossen – bass
- Michael DeRosier – drums

Production

- Connie and Howie (Ann Wilson, Nancy Wilson, Sue Ennis, Howard Leese) - producers
- David Thoener, Shelly Yakus - engineers
- Rob Perkins - assistant engineer
- Brian Foraker - assistant engineer, mixing
- Steve Marcantonio - mixing
- David Thoener - mixing, mastering
- Greg Calbi - mastering
