= Dixon House Band =

American prog-rock/pop group

The Dixon House Band was a prog-rock/pop group based in Seattle, Washington in the late 1970s. It issued one album on New York City-based Infinity Records in 1979 entitled Fighting Alone and had a minor chart hit with the song "Sooner Or Later".

The band got its name from the founder and keyboard player/lead vocalist, Dixon House, who was a well-known and popular band leader and singer in Victoria, BC who moved to Vancouver in 1974 to pursue a recording career.

The band's sound was a cross between the vocal sound and melodic hooks of Styx combined with some of the musical prowess and lyricism of Kansas, but with heavier guitars using a thinly compressed sound. It also had a female guitarist like Seattle counterpart Heart. Like many rock groups of its day at the dawn of the 1980s, it suffered from poor promotion and record company support.

The band worked with Vancouver's Mushroom Records and producer Mike Flicker, who supported and promoted the band. He had also produced albums for the band Heart while they were signed to the Mushroom label.

Members of the band were:

- Dixon House on keyboards and vocals
- Chrissy Shefts on guitars
- Chuck Gardner on guitars
- James Kenfield on bass
- Fred Zeufeldt on drums

== Discography ==
The Dixon House Band released one album that consisted of eleven tracks. All the lyrics and music were written by Edward Dixon House. The Dixon House Band travelled to Seattle to record "Fighting Alone" at Sea-West Studios, which was produced by Flicker for Mike Flicker Productions.

=== Fighting Alone ===
(Infinity 1979) Produced by Mike Flicker

1. Sooner or later
2. Crusader
3. Turn around
4. Angela
5. Who's gonna love you tonight?
6. Fighting
7. Feelin' no pain
8. Runnin' scared
9. Saracen ride
10. The promise
11. Fighting alone

== E. Dixon House ==
(Edward) Dixon House (1950-) is currently a classical playwright and works in conjunction with Stuart Joseph Johnston (1951-).

His solo work includes:

=== Masked Madness ===
(1981)

1. Just one kiss (House & Leese)
2. Wait for the night
3. Green light
4. Our love
5. Too late, Belinda
6. Masked madness
7. If you wanna go the distance (beat them to the punch)
8. Layanna (House & Leese)
9. Automatic Pilot
10. All too clear

Other work

- Jealousy (1982), words and music by R Meisner, D House and H Leese
- It ain't no mystery (1985), by Stuart Joseph Johnston & Edward Dixon House
- The face of the dove (1988), screenplay by Stuart Joseph Johnston & Edward Dixon House
