= Fanatic (album) =

Studio album by Heart
- Released: October 2, 2012
- Recorded: May 2011 – March 2012
- Studios: Sunset Sound (Los Angeles) (Note: December 2011); The Village (Los Angeles) (Note: January 2012); Room 320 (Bellevue, Washington) (Note: Additional recording; May and November 2011); Ritz-Carlton (Chicago) (Note: Additional recording; August 4–7, 2011); Sunset Marquis Villa (Los Angeles) (Note: Additional recording; June 2011); Jerry Don's bus (St. Louis) (Note: Additional recording; August 10, 2011); Lochinkop (Vancouver) (Note: Additional recording; June 2011 – March 2012); Plumper Sound (Pender Island, British Columbia) (Note: Additional recording; June–November 2011)
- Genres: Hard rock; folk rock
- Length: 39:41
- Label: Legacy
- Producer: Ben Mink

Heart chronology
Strange Euphoria (2012)	Fanatic (2012)	Beautiful Broken (2016)

Singles from Fanatic
- 1. "Fanatic" Released: 2012

Fanatic is the fifteenth studio album by American rock band Heart, released on October 2, 2012, by Legacy Recordings. The album was recorded in hotel rooms and studios up and down the West Coast, with Grammy Award-winning producer Ben Mink, who had previously produced Red Velvet Car (2010), back at the helm.

Ann and Nancy Wilson drew from their own lives and personal experiences as inspiration for the album. "Dear Old America" comes from memories of a military household and is written from the point of view of their father, a Marine Corps officer, returning from war. "Rock Deep (Vancouver)" hearkens back to the city where Dreamboat Annie was written and "Walkin' Good" (a duet with Vancouver resident Sarah McLachlan) captures the joy of finding new life in a new love.

Fanatic debuted at number 24 on the Billboard 200, selling 16,000 copies in its first week. The album also reached number 12 on Billboard's Top Rock Albums chart. The song "Fanatic" peaked at number 24 on Billboard's Heritage Rock chart.

== Critical reception ==
Professional ratings
Aggregate scores
Source	Rating
Metacritic	74/100
Review scores
Source	Rating
AllMusic	3.5/5 stars
The A.V. Club	B−
PopMatters	9/10
Revolver	3.5/5 stars
Rolling Stone	3/5 stars

Fanatic was met with "generally favorable" reviews from critics. At Metacritic, which assigns a weighted average rating out of 100 to reviews from mainstream publications, this release received an average score of 74, based on 5 reviews.

== Track listing ==
All tracks are written by Ann Wilson, Nancy Wilson and Ben Mink, except where noted.

No.	Title	Length
1.	"Fanatic"	3:44
2.	"Dear Old America"	4:01
3.	"Walkin' Good" (with Sarah McLachlan)	3:46
4.	"Skin and Bones"	3:42
5.	"A Million Miles"	5:05
6.	"Pennsylvania"	3:10
7.	"Mashallah!"	4:07
8.	"Rock Deep (Vancouver)"	4:20
9.	"59 Crunch"	3:21
10.	"Corduroy Road"	4:25
Total length:		39:41

Best Buy exclusive edition bonus tracks
No.	Title	Writer(s)	Length
11.	"Beautiful Broken"	A. Wilson; N. Wilson; Mink; James Alan Hetfield	2:40
12.	"Two Silver Rings"		2:57
13.	"Zingara"		3:56
Total length:			49:14

Japanese edition bonus tracks
No.	Title	Writer(s)	Length
11.	"Going to California" (live)	Jimmy Page; Robert Plant	4:44
12.	"Misty Mountain Hop" (live)	Page; Plant; John Paul Jones	5:00
Total length:			49:25

== Personnel ==
Credits adapted from the liner notes of Fanatic.

=== Heart ===
- Ann Wilson – vocals (tracks 1, 2, 4–10); background vocals (all tracks); flute (track 3)
- Nancy Wilson – guitar (tracks 1–5, 7–10); background vocals (all tracks); mandolin (track 5)
- Ben Mink – guitar, programming (all tracks); sonic mangling (track 1); violin (tracks 2, 3, 5, 7–9); viola (tracks 2, 3, 5, 7, 9); keyboards (tracks 2, 4–7, 9, 10); banjo, organ (track 3); mandolin (tracks 5, 10); field holler (track 5); background vocals (track 7); baritone viola (tracks 8, 10); string arrangements, strings (all tracks)
- Ric Markmann – bass
- Ben Smith – drums, percussion

=== Additional musicians ===
- Sarah McLachlan – vocals, background vocals (track 3)

=== Technical ===
- Ben Mink – production
- David Leonard – recording, mixing
- Alex Williams, Geoff Neal, Sam Hofstedt, David Eaman – engineering assistance
- Chris Potter – recording (Sarah McLachlan vocals) (track 3)
- Craig Waddell – mastering at Gotham City Studios (Vancouver)

=== Artwork ===
- Mike Joyce – art direction, design
- Norman Seeff – photography
- Ann Wilson – sketch
- Carol Peters – sketch
- Ben Mink – photography

== Charts ==
Chart performance for Fanatic
Chart (2012)	Peak position
Japanese Albums (Oricon)	118
UK Albums (Official Charts)	142
UK Rock & Metal Albums (Official Charts)	14
US Billboard 200	24
US Top Rock Albums (Billboard)	12
US Indie Store Album Sales (Billboard)	16
