= Live in Atlantic City (Heart album) =

Live album by Heart
- Released: January 25, 2019
- Recorded: March 10, 2006
- Venue: Trump Taj Majal (Atlantic City, New Jersey)
- Length: 67:47 (CD/LP)
- Label: earMUSIC
- Director: Milton Lage
- Producer: Barry Summers

Heart chronology
Beautiful Broken (2016)	Live in Atlantic City (2019)

Live in Atlantic City is a live album and home video release by American rock band Heart, recorded during their concert at the Trump Taj Majal in Atlantic City for VH1's Decades Rock Live! show on March 10, 2006. It was released on CD, LP, DVD, Blu-ray, streaming and digital download on January 25, 2019, through earMUSIC. The concert features guest appearances by Alice in Chains, Gretchen Wilson, Rufus Wainwright, Carrie Underwood, Dave Navarro, Phil Anselmo and Duff McKagan.

This concert marked the first time that William DuVall performed with Alice in Chains as a guest vocalist. Following the concert, DuVall toured with the band and became their official co-lead vocalist and rhythm guitarist.

== Track listing ==
No.	Title	Writer(s)	Length
1.	"Bebe le Strange" (with Dave Navarro)	Ann Wilson; Nancy Wilson; Sue Ennis; Roger Fisher	4:14
2.	"Straight On" (with Dave Navarro)	A. Wilson; N. Wilson; Sue Ennis	5:05
3.	"Crazy on You" (with Dave Navarro)	A. Wilson; N. Wilson	3:28
4.	"Lost Angel"	N. Wilson	6:51
5.	"Even It Up" (with Gretchen Wilson)	A. Wilson; N. Wilson; Sue Ennis	4:24
6.	"Rock and Roll" (Led Zeppelin cover, with Gretchen Wilson)	John Bonham; John Paul Jones; Jimmy Page; Robert Plant	3:53
7.	"Dog & Butterfly" (with Rufus Wainwright)	A. Wilson; N. Wilson; Sue Ennis	5:46
8.	"Would?" (Alice in Chains featuring (Duff McKagan) (CD and LP exclusive)	Jerry Cantrell	4:23
9.	"Rooster" (Alice in Chains featuring William DuVall, Ann and Nancy Wilson)	Jerry Cantrell	6:33
10.	"Alone" (with Carrie Underwood)	Tom Kelly; Billy Steinberg	3:57
11.	"Magic Man"	A. Wilson; N. Wilson	4:38
12.	"Misty Mountain Hop" (Led Zeppelin cover, with Dave Navarro)	John Paul Jones; Jimmy Page; Robert Plant	5:21
13.	"Dreamboat Annie"	A. Wilson; N. Wilson	3:00
14.	"Barracuda" (with Jerry Cantrell, Dave Navarro, Duff McKagan and Rufus Wainwright)	A. Wilson; N. Wilson; Michael Derosier; Roger Fisher	6:14

DVD and Blu-ray also include:

- Bonus: Heart Confidential

== Personnel ==
=== Heart ===
- Ann Wilson – lead and backing vocals, acoustic guitar, flute
- Nancy Wilson – backing vocals, lead and rhythm guitars, acoustic guitar, mandolin
- Craig Bartock – guitars
- Mike Inez – bass guitar
- Debbie Shair – keyboards
- Ben Smith – drums, percussion

=== Alice in Chains ===
- Jerry Cantrell – guitar and vocals
- Sean Kinney – drums
- Mike Inez – bass
- William DuVall – vocals
- Phil Anselmo – vocals
- Duff McKagan – guitar
- Management by Bill Siddons, Susan Silver, Jordan Yousem
- Production crew – Rem Massingil, Tavis LeMay, Jason Stockwell

Production

- Executive producer – Barry Summers
- Co-executive producer – Eric Sherman
- Directed by Milton Lage
- Musical director – Nancy Wilson
- Edited by Marc Schrobilgen
- Heart Management by Sacha Guzy
- FOH engineer – James Geddes
- Monitor engineer – Nathan Payne
- Audio engineer – Keith Windhorst
- Instrument techs – Jeff Ousley, Jason Stockwell, Jeff Diffner
- Carpenter/equipment manager/teleprompter – Joel Bennett
- Original mix by Peter A. Parker, Nancy Wilson, Craig Bartock, Jerry Cantrell and Sean Kinney
- Mix and mastered by Eike Freese, Chameleon Studios, Hamburg
- Recorded live during Decades Rock Live in Atlantic City, March 10, 2006

== Charts ==
Chart (2019)	Peak position
US Current Album Sales (Billboard)	79
US Independent Albums (Billboard)	17
