= Magazine (Heart album) =

Studio album by Heart
- Released: April 19, 1977
- Recorded: 1975; 1976; March 6–9, 1978 (second version)
- Studios: Mushroom (Vancouver) (Note: 1976); Sea-West (Seattle) (Note: 1978 (remix)); The Aquarius Tavern (Seattle) (Note: 1975 (live tracks))
- Genre: Hard rock
- Length: 40:54
- Label: Mushroom
- Producer: Mike Flicker

Heart chronology
Dreamboat Annie (1975)	Magazine (1977)	Little Queen (1977)

Singles from Magazine
- 1. "Heartless" Released: March 1978; 2. "Without You" Released: May 1978; 3. "Magazine" Released: July 1978

Magazine is the second studio album by American rock band Heart. It was originally released on April 19, 1977, by Mushroom Records in unfinished form, without the band's permission. A second, authorized version of the album was released on April 22, 1978. The album has been certified platinum in both the United States and Canada.

== Background ==
After their debut album, Dreamboat Annie, Heart began recording new songs at Mushroom Studios in Vancouver, Canada that were intended as their next studio album. However, the group had a falling out with Mushroom over an advertisement celebrating the sales of the debut album. The advertisement ran as a full-page ad in the December 30, 1976 issue of Rolling Stone magazine, and was designed to resemble the cover of a salacious tabloid-style magazine (a satire of the National Enquirer). It showed the Wilson sisters, Ann and Nancy, bare-shouldered (as on the Dreamboat Annie album cover) with the suggestive caption "It Was Only Our First Time!"

Recording sessions for the new album stopped after the band and their label were unsuccessful in re-negotiating their contract. Only five incomplete recordings were made during these 1976 sessions. As Heart had now proven themselves to be hit makers, they expected Mushroom to raise their royalty rate. However, to the surprise of the group and their producer Mike Flicker, the label refused to pay more.

While keeping the group under contract, Mushroom apparently was not interested in releasing a second Heart album. Flicker then ended his relationship with the label. The contract stipulated that Flicker would be the producer of all Heart recordings. The band took the position that since Mushroom was unable to provide the services of Flicker they would be free to sign with another label. Heart hired a lawyer to resolve the dispute, and they signed with Portrait Records, a subsidiary of CBS Records (now Sony Music Entertainment).

== Original 1977 release ==
The change in labels resulted in a prolonged legal battle with Mushroom's creative director Shelly Siegel. Still having a two-album contract, Mushroom claimed they had the legal right to release a second Heart album after all. Still in possession of the five unfinished studio recordings, as well as unreleased live tracks recorded in 1975, Mushroom had them remixed by the band's recording engineer, but without the group members.

The label added another studio track, "Here Song" (the B-side to "How Deep It Goes", Heart's first Canadian single from 1975). The rest of the album was filled by two live songs recorded in 1975 at The Aquarius Tavern, a rock club in Seattle where the group had played regularly. Mushroom released the collection as Magazine in the spring of 1977, at the same time that the group was preparing their next album for Portrait, titled Little Queen.

According to Flicker, about 50,000 copies of the original Magazine album were pressed. Some of these copies were sold in California and Florida, where the records were manufactured. Unsold copies were quickly recalled and later destroyed when Heart took Mushroom to court to stop distribution of the album. The 1977 version was also briefly released in Europe through Arista Records, but were ordered off shelves by a second court action.

Though the album was not officially released to radio stations in 1977, some stations such as KISW, a Seattle-based rock station, played songs from the unauthorized version, despite objections from Heart. The 1977 release carried a disclaimer on the back cover that read:

"Mushroom Records regrets that a contractual dispute has made it necessary to complete this record without the cooperation or endorsement of the group Heart, who have expressly disclaimed artistic involvement in completing this record. We did not feel that a contractual dispute should prevent the public from hearing and enjoying these incredible tunes and recordings."

== Injunction, re-recording and remixing ==
Unhappy with the somewhat unpolished studio performances and the inclusion of the live recordings, the group took Mushroom to court with the aim of having the 1977 release of Magazine withdrawn from the market. A Seattle court ruled that Mushroom had to recall the album, but the settlement terms required that Heart provide a second album for Mushroom. The band and Flicker chose to fulfill this obligation by finishing the previously released songs to a quality of their satisfaction.

For the 1978 version, Heart chose to re-record, remix, edit and re-sequence the songs. This work was done from March 6 to 9, 1978, at Sea-West Studios in Seattle. Ann Wilson added new lead vocals to some of the existing tracks, replacing the earlier scratch vocals with final takes.

On the original recording of "Heartless", Ann sings, "The doc said come back again next week..." On the re-recorded version, she sings doctor instead. The new lead vocal on "Heartless" is less controlled than the original. The synthesizer solo on "Just the Wine" was replaced by a flute solo and the song is slightly edited. The ending of "Magazine" fades about 30 seconds earlier. The live "Blues Medley" was edited to remove some of Roger Fisher's guitar solo sections and Ann's solo vocal parts. There are also many other subtle differences. The revised version of the album was released with no disclaimer by Mushroom in April 1978.

== Epilogue ==
In the early 1980s, Mushroom Records went out of business. Ownership rights to Heart's two albums for Mushroom were purchased by Capitol Records, which reissued the recordings. The 1978 release was also pressed as a picture disc featuring the album cover. The back cover indicates that it is a special limited edition of 100,000 copies. The original cover had a circle cut out of it. This circle was sent to record stores to be hung in the store for promotion of the album.

== Critical reception ==
Professional ratings
Review scores
Source	Rating
AllMusic	2/5 stars
(The New) Rolling Stone Album Guide	2/5 stars

The New York Times wrote that "Ann Wilson's vocals are worth hearing, and several of the songs are good enough so that one can see why the Wilsons were loath to lose control of them without a fight." Cash Box said of the title track that "Ann Wilson shines vocally on this lush, engaging ballad, as sister Nancy provides sweet acoustic guitar", and also praised Flicker's production.

== Track listing ==
=== 1977 release ===
Side one
No.	Title	Writer(s)	Length
1.	"Heartless"	Ann Wilson; Nancy Wilson	5:00
2.	"Without You" (originally recorded by Badfinger)	Pete Ham; Tom Evans	4:44
3.	"Just the Wine"	A. Wilson; N. Wilson	4:30
4.	"Magazine"	A. Wilson; N. Wilson	6:55

Side two
No.	Title	Writer(s)	Length
5.	"Here Song"	A. Wilson	1:35
6.	"Devil Delight"	A. Wilson; N. Wilson	4:58
7.	"Blues Medley: Mother Earth / You Shook Me Babe" (live)	Peter Chatman / Willie Dixon	7:11
8.	"I've Got the Music in Me" (live)	Bias Boshell	6:01
Total length:			40:54

=== 1978 release ===
Side one
No.	Title	Writer(s)	Length
1.	"Heartless"	A. Wilson; N. Wilson	4:59
2.	"Devil Delight"	A. Wilson; N. Wilson	4:58
3.	"Just the Wine"	A. Wilson; N. Wilson	4:15
4.	"Without You"	Ham; Evans	4:43

Side two
No.	Title	Writer(s)	Length
5.	"Magazine"	A. Wilson; N. Wilson	6:19
6.	"Here Song"	A. Wilson	1:34
7.	"Mother Earth Blues" (live)	Chatman	5:42
8.	"I've Got the Music in Me" (live)	Boshell	6:01
Total length:			38:31

== Personnel ==
=== 1977 release ===
Credits adapted from the liner notes of the 1977 original version of Magazine.

Heart

- Nancy Wilson
- Ann Wilson
- Mike DeRosier
- Howard Leese
- Steve Fossen
- Roger Fisher

Technical

- Rolf Hennemann – production
- Mike Flicker – production, engineering, remix
- Jeff Tolman – remix engineering assistance

Artwork

- Loren Salazar – front cover art
- Burl Davis – art direction
- Glenn Ross – art direction

=== 1978 release ===
Credits adapted from the liner notes of the 1978 revised version of Magazine.

Heart

- Steve Fossen – bass, vocals
- Michael DeRosier – drums
- Howard Leese – guitars, keyboards, vocals (unspecified tracks); guitar solo (tracks 1, 7); sitar, Avatar (track 2); Mellotron (track 3); string arrangements, string conducting (tracks 3–6); back-up vocals (track 5)
- Roger Fisher – lead guitar (unspecified tracks); guitar solo (track 1)
- Nancy Wilson – electric guitar, vocals (unspecified tracks); lead guitar (track 1); acoustic guitar (tracks 3, 6); back-up vocals (track 5); blues harp (track 7)
- Ann Wilson – lead vocals (unspecified tracks); flute, alto flute (track 3); back-up vocals (track 5); acoustic guitar (track 6)

Additional musicians

- Lynn Wilson – back-up vocals (track 5)

Technical

- Mike Flicker – production, engineering
- Heart – production assistance
- Mike Fisher – production assistance, special direction
- Rick Keefer – engineering
- Larry Green – engineering assistance
- Terry Gottlieb – engineering assistance
- Rolf Hennemann – engineering assistance
- The Explorer – recording (tracks 7, 8)

Artwork

- Loren Salazar – front cover art

== Charts ==
=== Weekly charts ===
Chart (1978)	Peak position
Australian Albums (Kent Music Report)	66
Canada Top Albums/CDs (RPM)	13
US Billboard 200	17

=== Year-end charts ===
Chart (1978)	Position
Canada Top Albums/CDs (RPM)	84
US Billboard 200	90

== Certifications ==
Region	Certification	Certified units/sales
Canada (Music Canada)	Platinum	100,000^{^}
United States (RIAA)	Platinum	1,000,000^{^}
^{^} Shipments figures based on certification alone.
