= Sardonyx (guitar) =

Electric guitar model

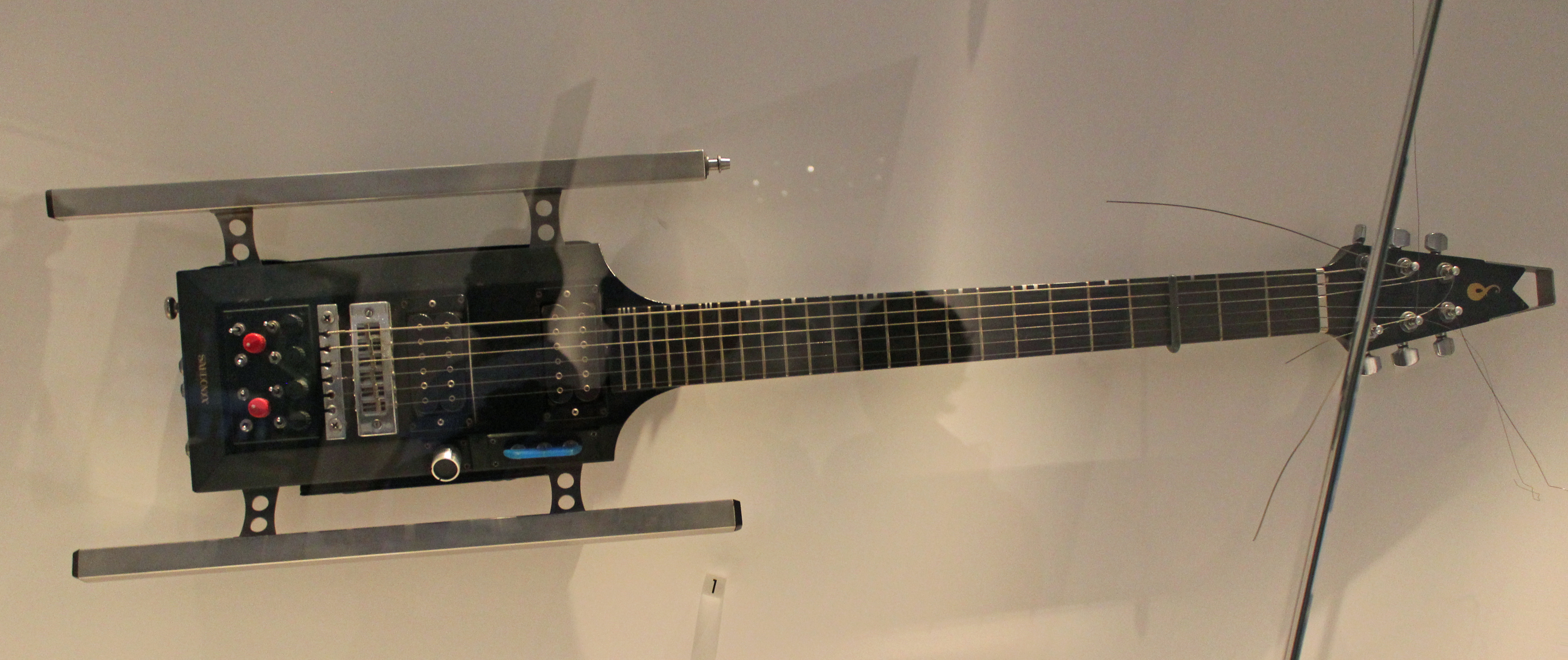
John Lennon's Sardonyx guitar

The Sardonyx was an electric guitar made in small numbers in the late 1970s. The guitar was notable because of its small rectangular wood body that had "outrigger" aluminum tubes running parallel to the body. Popularized by Howard Leese, then guitarist for Heart, it was one of the two main guitars used by John Lennon during the recording of Double Fantasy. Other notable players were Ian Hunter and Wes Beech of the Plasmatics.

The Sardonyx was made by luthier Jeff Levin, who worked for Matt Umanov's Lower Manhattan's guitar store. The body is made of wood. Inside the top aluminum tube is a smaller tube to which the strap is attached; it slides in and out, allowing the player to balance the guitar. A basic and a more upscale model were available, with Leese, Lennon, and Hunter playing the latter. Its electronics were highly complex: the guitar had two output channels, and the player could, via a set of mini-toggle switches, direct the sound from each of two DiMarzio humbucker pickups to either of the channels, with pickups set in series, parallel, or out of phase with each other. Levin also made a bass version.

Umanov estimates that maybe two dozen guitars were built. Years later, Earnie Bailey (former guitar technician for Kurt Cobain and the Foo Fighters), built some 30 guitars and basses based on the Sardonyx, sold mostly to collectors.
