= Beautiful Broken =

Studio album by Heart
- Released: July 8, 2016
- Studio: Sunset Sound (Hollywood, California); Tom-Tom (Budapest, Hungary) (Note: Strings)
- Genre: Hard rock; folk rock
- Length: 40:19
- Label: Concord
- Producer: Dan Rothchild; Nancy Wilson

Heart chronology
Fanatic (2012)	Beautiful Broken (2016)	Live in Atlantic City (2019)

Professional ratings
Aggregate scores
Source	Rating
Metacritic	72/100
Review scores
Source	Rating
AllMusic	3/5 stars
Louder Sound	4/5 stars
PopMatters	7/10 stars
Renowned for Sound	2/5 stars

Beautiful Broken is the sixteenth studio album by American rock band Heart, released on July 8, 2016, by Concord Records. Aside from two new songs, the album consists mostly of re-interpretations of songs from the band's earlier albums.

== Track listing ==
No.	Title	Writer(s)	Length
1.	"Beautiful Broken" (original version on the Fanatic deluxe edition)	Ann Wilson; Nancy Wilson; Ben Mink; James Alan Hetfield	2:25
2.	"Two"	Shaffer "Ne-Yo" Smith; Jesse "Corporal" Wilson; Adam "Royal Z" Waldman	4:23
3.	"Sweet Darlin'" (original version on Bébé le Strange)	A. Wilson	3:52
4.	"I Jump"	A. Wilson; N. Wilson; Dan Rothchild	3:52
5.	"Johnny Moon" (original version on Passionworks)	A. Wilson; N. Wilson; Sue Ennis	4:15
6.	"Heaven" (original version on Alive in Seattle)	A. Wilson; N. Wilson; Ennis	5:23
7.	"City's Burning" (original version on Private Audition)	A. Wilson; N. Wilson; Ennis	3:50
8.	"Down on Me" (original version on Bébé le Strange)	A. Wilson; N. Wilson; Ennis	5:12
9.	"One Word" (original version on Private Audition)	N. Wilson	3:33
10.	"Language of Love" (original version on Passionworks)	A. Wilson; N. Wilson; Ennis	3:34

== Personnel ==
Credits adapted from the liner notes of Beautiful Broken.

=== Heart ===
- Ann Wilson – vocals (tracks 1, 3–10); background vocals (tracks 2, 7); autoharp (track 6)
- Nancy Wilson – guitar (tracks 1–3, 5, 7, 8); background vocals (tracks 1, 2, 4–7, 10); vocals (tracks 2, 9); marxophone (track 5); bowed acoustic guitar (track 6); acoustic guitar (tracks 7, 10); autoharp, handclaps, whispers (track 10)
- Ben Smith – drums (all tracks); percussion (tracks 3, 5–10); claps, snaps (track 9)
- Craig Bartock – guitars (tracks 1, 4–8); acoustic guitar (tracks 3, 9, 10); 12-string acoustic guitar (tracks 3, 5); background vocals (tracks 4, 10); percussive guitar, claps, snaps (track 9)
- Chris Joyner – synthesizers (tracks 1, 2, 4, 6, 8, 9); piano (tracks 2–5); Wurlitzer (tracks 4, 7, 9, 10); Hammond B3 (tracks 4, 10); field organ, nylon-string guitar (track 9)
- Dan Rothchild – bass (tracks 1, 3, 4–8, 10); background vocals (tracks 1, 5–7, 10); additional synthesizer (tracks 1, 9); Moog bass (tracks 2, 6); Hammond B3, additional piano (track 2); background vocals (tracks 2, 4); guitar (track 4); acoustic guitar (tracks 4, 6); lap steel guitar (tracks 4, 5); percussion (tracks 5, 7, 10); textures (track 5); upright bass (tracks 6, 9); additional guitar (track 7); handclaps (track 10)

=== Additional musicians ===
- James Hetfield – vocals, background vocals (track 1)
- Paul Buckmaster – string arrangement (tracks 3, 4, 7, 10)
- Hungarian Studio Orchestra – strings (tracks 3, 4, 7, 10)
  - Péter Illényi – conducting
  - Péter Kanyurszky – concertmaster
- Ken Sluiter – additional textures (track 5); claps, snaps (track 9); textures (track 10)
- Billy Mims – claps, snaps (track 9)
- Dwight Mikkelsen – copyist

=== Technical ===
- Dan Rothchild – production
- Nancy Wilson – production
- Ken Sluiter – engineering, mixing
- Bill Mims – additional engineering
- Howie Weinberg – mastering
- Gentry Studer – mastering assistance
- Chris Claypool – engineering assistance
- Geoff Neal – engineering assistance
- Greg Fidelman – additional engineering (James Hetfield's vocals)
- Kurina Tamás – strings recording

=== Artwork ===
- Brian McGuffey – artwork
- Nancy Wilson – art direction
- Anna Knowlden – photography
- Dan Rothchild – photography

== Charts ==
Chart performance for Beautiful Broken
Chart (2016)	Peak position
Belgian Albums (Ultratop Flanders)	136
Scottish Albums (OCC)	29
UK Albums (OCC)	77
US Billboard 200	105
US Top Rock Albums (Billboard)	9
