= Red Velvet Car =

Studio album by Heart
- Released: August 31, 2010
- Recorded: 2009–2010
- Studio: Octopus' Garden (Los Angeles); Lochinkop (Vancouver) (Note: Additional recording)
- Genre: Hard rock; folk rock
- Length: 37:46
- Label: Legacy
- Producer: Ben Mink

Heart chronology
| Playlist: The Very Best of Heart (2008) | Red Velvet Car (2010) | Strange Euphoria (2012) |

Singles from Red Velvet Car
- 1. "WTF" Released: August 2010

Professional ratings
Aggregate scores
| Source | Rating |
|---|---|
| Metacritic | 71/100 |
Review scores
| Source | Rating |
| AllMusic | 3.5/5 stars |
| Billboard | 3/5 stars |
| Los Angeles Times | 3.5/4 stars |
| Now | 3/5 |
| PopMatters | 7/10 |
| Rolling Stone | 3.5/5 stars |
| Uncut | 3/5 stars |

Red Velvet Car is the fourteenth studio album by American rock band Heart, released on August 31, 2010, by Legacy Recordings. The album debuted at number 10 on the US Billboard 200 with 27,000 copies sold in its first week, making it Heart's first top-10 album since Brigade (1990). It spawned the singles "Hey You" (number 26 on the Adult Contemporary chart) and "WTF" (number 19 on the Hot Singles Sales chart).

The album was released with differing track lists according to format in different territories: the standard US CD release features 10 tracks, the European CD and US download version contain 12 tracks, while the Japanese CD and some exclusive download versions contain 13 tracks. Though the 13th track is "Listening" on the Japanese CD, some exclusive download versions replace this with a live 2010 version of "Crazy on You".

== Track listing ==
| No. | Title | Writer(s) | Length |
|---|---|---|---|
| 1. | "There You Go" | Ann Wilson; Nancy Wilson; Craig Bartock | 3:36 |
| 2. | "WTF" | A. Wilson; N. Wilson; Bartock; Ben Mink | 3:26 |
| 3. | "Red Velvet Car" | A. Wilson; N. Wilson; Mink | 2:59 |
| 4. | "Queen City" | A. Wilson; N. Wilson; Bartock | 4:16 |
| 5. | "Hey You" | N. Wilson; Mink | 4:13 |
| 6. | "Wheels" | A. Wilson; N. Wilson; Sue Ennis; Mink | 3:06 |
| 7. | "Safronia's Mark" | A. Wilson; N. Wilson; Bartock | 3:54 |
| 8. | "Death Valley" | A. Wilson; N. Wilson; Mink | 3:53 |
| 9. | "Sunflower" | N. Wilson; Mink | 3:42 |
| 10. | "Sand" (Lovemongers cover) | A. Wilson; N. Wilson; Ennis; Frank Cox | 4:07 |

Target exclusive edition bonus tracks
| No. | Title | Writer(s) | Length |
|---|---|---|---|
| 11. | "Closer to the Sun" | A. Wilson; N. Wilson; Bartock; Mink | 4:52 |
| 12. | "In the Cool" | A. Wilson; N. Wilson; Bartock | 3:54 |

Australian, Canadian and European edition bonus tracks
| No. | Title | Writer(s) | Length |
|---|---|---|---|
| 11. | "Bootful of Beer" | A. Wilson; N. Wilson; Mink | 2:55 |
| 12. | "Closer to the Sun" | A. Wilson; N. Wilson; Bartock; Mink | 4:52 |

Japanese edition bonus tracks
| No. | Title | Writer(s) | Length |
|---|---|---|---|
| 11. | "Bootful of Beer" | A. Wilson; N. Wilson; Mink | 2:55 |
| 12. | "Closer to the Sun" | A. Wilson; N. Wilson; Bartock; Mink | 4:52 |
| 13. | "Listening" | | 4:55 |

== Personnel ==
Credits adapted from the liner notes of Red Velvet Car.

- Ann Wilson – vocals, flute
- Nancy Wilson – vocals, guitars, mandolin, autoharp, Dobro
- Ben Smith – drums, percussion
- Ric Markmann – bass guitar
- Ben Mink – guitars, gypsy fiddle, viola, lap steel, programming, vocals, string arrangements
- Craig Bartock – Dobro on "Safronia's Mark"
- Geddy Lee – whistle on "Death Valley"

=== Technical ===
- Ben Mink – production
- David Leonard – recording, mixing
- Patrick MacDougall – second engineer
- Andrew Bodkin, Melanie Mullens, Matthew MacDougall, Masa Fukudome, David Eaman – engineering assistance
- Craig Waddell – mastering at Gotham City Studios (Vancouver)

=== Artwork ===
- Jesse Higman – cover image
- Amber McDonald – package design, photos
- Randee St. Nicholas – photos

== Charts ==
Chart performance for Red Velvet Car
| Chart (2010) | Peak position |
|---|---|
| Japanese Albums (Oricon) | 243 |
| UK Albums (OCC) | 196 |
| UK Independent Albums (OCC) | 20 |
| US Billboard 200 | 10 |
| US Top Rock Albums (Billboard) | 3 |
| US Indie Store Album Sales (Billboard) | 12 |
