= Luck in My Eyes =

1990 song performed by k.d. lang

Single by k.d. lang

from the album Absolute Torch and Twang
- Released: 1990
- Genre: Country
- Length: 4:10
- Label: Sire
- Songwriters: k.d. lang Ben Mink
- Producers: k.d. lang Ben Mink; Greg Penny

K.d. lang singles chronology
"Pulling Back the Reins" (1990)	"Luck in My Eyes" (1990)	"Big Boned Gal" (1990)

"Luck in My Eyes" is a song recorded by Canadian country music artist k.d. lang. It was released in 1990 as the fourth single from her fourth studio album, Absolute Torch and Twang. It peaked at number 10 on the RPM Country Tracks chart in April 1990. The song was nominated for a Grammy Award for Best Country Song at the 32nd Annual Grammy Awards.

== Chart performance ==
Chart (1990)	Peak position
Canada Country Singles (RPM)	10
