= Crazy on You =

1976 single by Heart

- Dutch 7-inch single cover

Single by Heart

from the album Dreamboat Annie
- B-side: "Dreamboat Annie"
- Released: March 1976
- Recorded: August 1975
- Genre: Hard rock; folk rock; folk metal; power pop
- Length: 3:09 (1st promo version); 3:11 (2nd promo version); 4:07 (3rd promo version); 4:14 (single version); 4:54 (album version)
- Label: Mushroom
- Songwriters: Ann Wilson; Nancy Wilson
- Producer: Mike Flicker

Heart singles chronology
"Magic Man" (1975)	"Crazy on You" (1976)	"Dreamboat Annie" (1976)

Music video
- "Crazy on You" (TopPop, 1977) on YouTube

"Crazy on You" is a song by American rock band Heart from their debut studio album, Dreamboat Annie (1975). It was released in March 1976 as the album's third single in Canada and the album's debut single in the United States. It reached the top 25 in Canada and the top 35 in the US. It found more success in the Netherlands and Belgium where it peaked at number 2 and 13, respectively, in early 1977 after its release as the second single from Dreamboat Annie in those countries. As of 2019, it was one of the most played tracks on classic rock radio stations in the US.

The song was used in the soundtracks of the films American Pop, Harold and Kumar Go To White Castle, Demolition, Captain Marvel, Guardians of the Galaxy Vol. 3 and The Strangers – Chapter 3.

== Description ==
Opening with an iconic acoustic guitar instrumental which is sometimes identified with Heart's acoustic piece "Silver Wheels", "Crazy on You" then turns into a fast-paced rock song. "Crazy on You" attracted attention both for the relatively unusual combination of an acoustic guitar paired with electric guitars and the fact that the acoustic guitarist was a woman – a rarity in rock music during that time. According to co-writer and guitarist Nancy Wilson, who discussed it on an episode of the radio program In the Studio with Redbeard that devoted an entire episode to the Dreamboat Annie album, the rapid acoustic rhythm part was inspired by The Moody Blues's 1970 song "Question". The guitar riff was created by Roger Fisher during recording sessions.

The song's lyrics tell of a person's desire to forget all the problems of the world during one night of passion. During an interview on the television series Private Sessions in 2007, Ann Wilson revealed the song was written in response to the stress caused by the Vietnam War and social unrest in the United States in the early 1970s.

The song was written while the band members were living in a small A-frame cottage in Point Roberts, Washington, situated on the Canada–United States border.

== Release ==
Released in both Canada and the US in March 1976, "Crazy on You" peaked at number 25 on RPM's Top Singles chart in Canada in May of that year and at number 35 on the US Billboard Hot 100 the following month. It remains one of Heart's signature songs and is still a staple on North American classic rock radio stations. The track received heavy airplay on FM Album-Oriented Rock stations, which drove sales of the parent album.

Chicago-based radio station WLS-AM, a current hit radio station where the song received heavy airplay, ranked "Crazy on You" as the 30th biggest song of 1976. It reached number three on the station's survey of August 7, 1976. After the success of "Crazy on You", "Magic Man" was released in the US and re-released in Canada, particularly in parts of Canada where it had not received much radio airplay before.

In the Netherlands, "Crazy on You" was released in February 1977 as the second single off Dreamboat Annie after "Magic Man" and rose to number 2 and 4 on the two charts in the country. It also ascended to number 13 in neighboring Belgium.

The single's original B-side, "Dreamboat Annie", was released on its own as an A-side in December 1976. The shortest version of "Dreamboat Annie" directly precedes "Crazy on You" on the original album, with little space between the songs.

Mushroom Records re-released "Crazy on You" in late 1977 in both the US and Canada with the same catalog number and B-side. In February 1978, the re-release reached number 62 on the Billboard Hot 100 and number 68 on RPM's Top Singles chart.

In 2013, the original lineup of the band performed the song for their induction into the Rock and Roll Hall of Fame, their first performance together in over 30 years. The current lineup of the band performed "Barracuda".

== Personnel ==
Adapted from the liner notes of Dreamboat Annie.

- Ann Wilson – lead vocals, flute, backing vocals
- Nancy Wilson – acoustic guitar, backing vocals
- Roger Fisher – electric guitar
- Howard Leese – electric guitar
- Steve Fossen – bass

Additional musicians

- Kat Hendrikse – drums
- Rob Deans – synthesizer
- Geoff Foubert – backing vocals
- Tessie Bensussen – backing vocals
- Jim Hill – backing vocals

Technical

- Mike Flicker – production, engineering
- Howard Leese – production assistance
- Rolf Hennemann – engineering
- Patrick Collins – mastering

== Charts ==
=== Weekly charts ===
1976–1977 weekly chart performance for "Crazy on You"
Chart (1976–1977)	Peak position
Australia (Kent Music Report)	70
Belgium (Ultratop 50 Flanders)	16
Canada Top Singles (RPM)	25
Netherlands (Dutch Top 40)	2
Netherlands (Single Top 100)	4
US Billboard Hot 100	35
US Cash Box Top 100	40

2023 weekly chart performance for "Crazy on You"
Chart (2023)	Peak position
US Hot Rock & Alternative Songs (Billboard)	25

=== Year-end charts ===
1976 year-end chart performance for "Crazy on You"
Chart (1976)	Position
Canada Top Singles (RPM)	182

1977 year-end chart performance for "Crazy on You"
Chart (1977)	Position
Netherlands (Dutch Top 40)	59
Netherlands (Single Top 100)	58

== Certifications ==
Certifications for "Crazy on You"
Region	Certification	Certified units/sales
New Zealand (RMNZ)	Gold	15,000^{‡}
^{‡} Sales+streaming figures based on certification alone.
