= Mushroom Studios =

Music studio in Vancouver, British Columbia, Canada

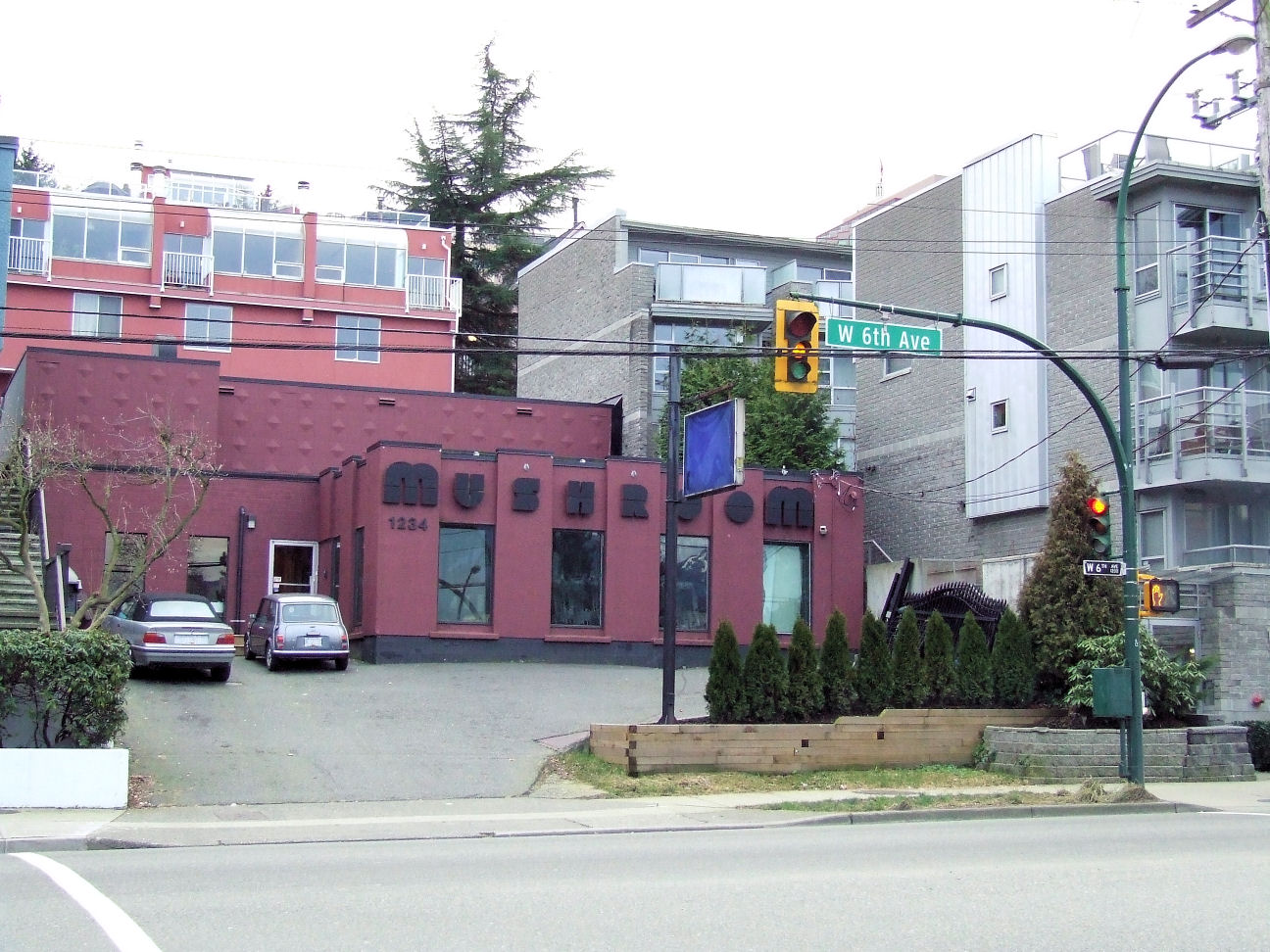
Mushroom Studios - Vancouver

Mushroom Studios was a music recording facility located in Vancouver, British Columbia, Canada with a long history in Canadian music. It has now been relocated to Toronto, Ontario, Canada.

The studio hosted the recording of many classic albums, by such artists as Incredible Bongo Band, Heart, Bachman–Turner Overdrive, Loverboy, Queensrÿche, Chilliwack, Doucette, Skinny Puppy, 54-40, Raffi, Spirit of the West, Jane Siberry, Sarah McLachlan, SNFU, Tegan and Sara, Mutators, and Rymes With Orange.

== History ==
In 1946, aided by Al Reusch, a musician, big band leader, and one of the first DJs in Vancouver, opened one of the first recording studios in the country in Vancouver and christened Aragon Recording Studios. By 1954, Reusch had acquired sole ownership of the company and subsequently built Mushroom Studios in 1966 at 1234 West 6th Avenue, Vancouver.

Built from the ground up as a first class audio recording studio, the facility was originally an orchestral recording room for special sessions by the Canadian Broadcasting Corporation. Author of The Audio Cyclopedia and award-winning acoustician Dr. Howard Tremaine consulted on the original acoustic design and equipment installation, which led to Diana Ross and The Supremes becoming some of the first clients, followed shortly by Led Zeppelin.

=== Sale to Herschorn ===
As Reusch apparently did not like the idea of recording post-Beatles rock and roll, he sold the facility within five years to Jack Herschorn, who had previously co-founded Studio 3 on West 12th Avenue with Tom Northcott. The sale materialized in the spring of 1971.

In a sponsorship deal, the studios were named "Can-Base Studios". Herschorn appointed Mike Flicker as Chief Engineer, Howard Leese as program manager and Charlie Richmond as Head Technical Advisor.

In 1971, Herschorn brought equipment formerly in use at United Western Recorders to Vancouver and installed in Aragon, including the original Universal Audio vacuum tube mixing console custom-built by Bill Putnam. This recording console had been in use in United Studio A at 6050 Sunset Boulevard in Hollywood since 1957, and had recorded hundreds of hits by such artists as Bing Crosby, Nat "King" Cole, Frank Sinatra and Ray Charles.

In 1973, the Incredible Bongo Band recorded their version of "Apache" at Can-Base Studios, in order to take advantage of Canadian content laws.

Can-Base was later renamed to "Mushroom Studios" after the recording label that was originally housed there. The studio gained prominence when Heart's hit debut album Dreamboat Annie was recorded at the studio and subsequently released on their in-house label Mushroom Records.

The studio was purchased by Charlie Richmond in 1980 and updated to accommodate over 50 musicians in semi-isolated concert format to do film scoring for dozens of feature films and movies of the week from Chuck Norris to a redo of The Dirty Dozen. The studio was recognized for the film score album of Top Gun.

For the seven years between 1999–2006, John Wozniak of Marcy Playground owned and operated the studio.

=== Hippowest ===
In 2006, Rob Darch, owner of Hipposonic Studios, bought the building but not the equipment therein and rechristened it to Hippowest.

For four years, the original equipment remained at Hippowest for clients' use, but at the end of 2010, the console and all electronic gear were moved cross country to a new location on Queen Street West in Toronto, Ontario, custom installed and is currently operated by a team at Mushroom under the guidance of John Wozniak.

In 2013, the original Vancouver location was sold due to increased costs and decreased booking and was no longer used as a studio. Hipposonic relocated to Great Northern Way Campus.
