= Ben Mink =

Canadian musician, songwriter, and producer (born 1951)

Benjamin Mink
- Born: January 22, 1951 (age 75); Toronto, Ontario, Canada
- Occupations: Musician; songwriter; producer
- Instruments: Guitar; violin; mandolin
- Website: benmink.com

Benjamin Mink CM (born January 22, 1951) is a Canadian songwriter, multi-instrumentalist, and producer best known as a longtime collaborator of Canadian singer k.d. lang. He plays several string instruments, notably the guitar, violin, and the mandolin.

== Early life, family, and education ==
Born to Polish Holocaust survivors, Mink was raised in Toronto, Canada.

== Career ==
=== Beginnings ===
Mink began performing with the rock/country group Mary-Lou Horner, which became the house band at the Rockpile bar and nightclub and acted as a backup band for Chuck Berry.

He has been a member of the groups Stringband, Murray McLauchlan's Silver Tractors, and FM.

=== With k.d. lang ===
Mink is best known as a longtime collaborator of Canadian singer k.d. lang, whom he met at Expo '85 while doing a gig with CANO. He has performed on, along with co-writing and producing, several of her albums, which often combine voice with string arrangements. Mink subsequently performed as violinist, guitarist, and mandolinist with lang's band, the Reclines. A performance for the Grammy-nominated album Ingénue was recorded as part of the MTV Unplugged series at the Ed Sullivan Theater, New York City, on December 16, 1992. Mink was interviewed about his songwriting collaboration with lang on the British television show South Bank Show in 1996.

=== With Rush ===
Mink was invited to play electric violin on the Rush song "Losing It", from their 1982 album, Signals. He also contributed strings to the song "Faithless" from the 2007 album, Snakes & Arrows. He also co-wrote, produced, and played guitar on My Favourite Headache (2000), a solo project of Rush lead singer and bassist, Geddy Lee. On June 19, 2015, he performed "Losing It" with the trio at the Air Canada Centre in Toronto, as part of their farewell R40 Live Tour.

=== Other collaborations ===
Mink has also produced and/or performed on recordings by Barenaked Ladies, Anne Murray, Dan Hill, Mendelson Joe, Prairie Oyster, Raffi, Jane Siberry, Ian and Sylvia Tyson, Valdy, Bruce Cockburn, Murray McLauchlan, Willie P. Bennett, Susan Aglukark, Methodman, Alison Krauss, Feist, Daniel Lanois, Sarah McLachlan, Roy Orbison, Elton John, and Heart.

He co-produced Red Velvet Car for Heart's Ann and Nancy Wilson, released in the fall of 2010, and appeared onstage in the band's concert video Night at Sky Church. Mink was back at the helm as producer of Heart's 2012 album Fanatic, which included the single "Walkin' Good", featuring Sarah McLachlan.

Mink co-produced and performed on Feist's Grammy-nominated hit single "1234", playing strings and guitars.

He is a member of Black Sea Station, a North American klezmer supergroup. Their debut recording, Transylvania Avenue, is produced by Mink, and was released on Rounder Records in the Fall of 2010 as a digital download. He has also produced other klezmer musical acts in the past, such as Finjan, the Klezmatics, and Chava Alberstein.

=== Soundtracks ===
Mink scored the 2007 biopic Confessions of an Innocent Man about British-Canadian engineer William Sampson, which garnered him a Gemini Award. He wrote the soundtrack to the film Fifty Dead Men Walking, which has since received numerous awards and nominations, including a 2010 Genie Award nomination for Best Achievement in Music—Original Score, and a 2009 Leo Award for Best Musical Score for a Feature-Length Drama. The television soundtracks for Terminal City and Alice both also garnered Leo Awards. In 2011, the TV series Glee used the 1992 song "Constant Craving", written by Mink and k.d. lang, in the seventh episode of the third season, for its closing number (performed by Chris Colfer, Idina Menzel and Naya Rivera).

=== Other work ===
Mink has lectured on such topics as "The Music Business vs. the Creative Process" at the University of British Columbia, Western Washington University, and Simon Fraser University. He has also worked with students as an associate of UBC's Department of Mechanical Engineering (robotics) and is an associate member of the Institute for Computing, Information & Cognitive Systems. In 2006, he delivered the introductory speech to k.d. lang's Governor General's Performing Arts Award induction at the National Arts Centre in Ottawa. He has also contributed to the Library and Archives Canada.

Mink is one of few people to ever share a songwriting credit with Mick Jagger and Keith Richards. In 1997, Mink and k.d. lang were co-credited as songwriters on the Rolling Stones single "Anybody Seen My Baby?" because Jagger-Richards felt the chorus was similar to "Constant Craving".

Mink has one solo recording—the 1980 release Foreign Exchange, on Passport Records.

== Selected awards ==
- Grammy Awards: In 1990, Mink was co-nominated with k.d. lang for a Best Country Song Grammy for "Luck in My Eyes". Subsequently, as a producer and writer, he has been nominated for a total of nine Grammies, winning twice for his work with lang.
- Juno Awards: He has received seven Juno nominations, winning three times between 1993 and 1994.
- Genie/Gemini Awards: Genie Award – Best Original Score for 50 Dead Men Walking; Gemini Award – Best British Columbia Film for Confessions of an Innocent Man.
- Leo Awards: Best Musical Score 2006, 2009, 2010.
