= Whirlygig (album) =

Studio album by The Lovemongers
- Released: December 9, 1997
- Recorded: Synergy Studio, Redmond, Washington, Mighty Mite, Los Angeles, California
- Genre: Rock
- Length: 47:20
- Label: Will Records
- Producer: The Lovemongers

The Lovemongers chronology
The Battle of Evermore (EP) (1993)	Whirlygig (1997)	Here Is Christmas (1998)

Professional ratings
Review scores
Source	Rating
AllMusic	4/5 stars

Whirlygig is the debut studio album by The Lovemongers.

The Lovemongers were a side project of singer-songwriting-musicians, and sisters, Ann and Nancy Wilson, better known as the frontwomen of the rock band Heart. They formed The Lovemongers with Sue Ennis and Frank Cox, and released Whirlygig in 1997 on Will Records. It contained all original material, with no outside writers.

Steve Huey of AllMusic gave the record 4 stars of 5, and he said that it "will likely appeal to fans of both Heart's earlier and later material."

== Track listing ==
All songs written by Ann Wilson, Nancy Wilson and Sue Ennis, except where noted.

1. "City on the Hill" - 4:51
2. "Miracle Girl" - 4:45
3. "Two Black Lambs" - 4:45
4. "No School Today" (Ennis) - 4:16
5. "The Vegas Gene" (Wilson, Wilson, Ennis, Frank Cox) - 3:17
6. "Kiss" - 5:08
7. "Runaway" - 4:36
8. "Elysian" - 5:20
9. "Heavy Sedation" (Cox) - 4:52
10. "Sand" (Wilson, Wilson, Ennis, Cox) - 5:10

== Personnel ==
=== The Lovemongers ===
- Ann Wilson - vocals, acoustic & electric guitars, bass, flute, percussion
- Nancy Wilson - vocals, acoustic & electric guitars, dulcimer, mandolin, drums, percussion
- Sue Ennis - keyboards
- Frank Cox - acoustic & electric guitars, mandolin, autoharp, sampling, drums, percussion

=== Additional musician ===
- Ben Smith - drums and percussion

=== Production ===
- The Lovemongers - arrangements, producers
- Vaughn "Stepping Stone" Verdi - engineer, mixing
- Daniel Mendez, Jason "Synergy" Shavey - engineers
- Bernie Grundman - mastering
