= Magic Man =

1975 single by Heart

Single by Heart

from the album Dreamboat Annie
- B-side: "How Deep It Goes"
- Released: June 1975 (Can.): June 1976 (US)
- Genre: Hard rock; power pop
- Length: 5:28 (album version); 3:29 (single edit)
- Label: Mushroom
- Songwriters: Ann Wilson; Nancy Wilson
- Producer: Mike Flicker

Heart singles chronology
"How Deep It Goes" (1975)	"Magic Man" (1975)	"Crazy on You" (1976)

Music video
- "Magic Man" (TopPop, 1976) on YouTube

"Magic Man" is a song by the American rock band Heart released as a single from their debut album, Dreamboat Annie. Written and composed by Ann and Nancy Wilson, the song is sung from the viewpoint of a young girl who is being seduced by an older man, much to the chagrin of her mother.

Years later, Ann Wilson revealed that the "Magic Man" was about her then boyfriend, band manager Michael Fisher, and that part of the song was an autobiographical tale of the beginnings of their relationship. Roger Fisher came up with the alternative tuning EADGDG for his guitar part. The album version of "Magic Man" features an over-two-minute instrumental break which consists of a guitar solo and the usage of a Minimoog synthesizer, while the single version of the song edits out most of this break, cutting it down from 5:28 to 3:29.

Cash Box said that "a funk rhythm is established quickly with some screaming guitar licks, and the vocal, handled by the female lead, plays well against the arrangement." Record World said that "The beguiling vocal sound of ['Crazy on You'] is duplicated here and accompanied by sumptuous guitar work that should steer it to the top."

"Magic Man" was originally released in Canada in June 1975 as the second single from the yet-to-be released Dreamboat Annie, the first single having been the folksy "How Deep It Goes". "Magic Man" spent 9 weeks on the RPM Singles Chart peaking at number 62 on August 16, 1975. The success of "Magic Man" prompted the release of the album and, in March 1976, a third single, "Crazy on You". After "Crazy on You" had a chart run, "Magic Man" gained popularity in new areas of the country almost a full year later and re-entered the RPM Singles Chart on September 11, 1976 for 14 weeks peaking at number 26 on October 30, 1976.

In the United States, "Magic Man" received its first release in summer 1976, after their first US single "Crazy on You" introduced Americans to the group's sound. It became Heart's first top 10 hit, peaking at No. 9 on the Billboard Hot 100 on November 6, 1976. In the Netherlands and Belgium, "Magic Man" was the first single released from the album in late 1976, and it peaked at number 7 and 10, respectively, in early 1977. It was also successful in Australia, where it peaked at number 6; it reached number 26 in New Zealand.

== Personnel ==
Credits adapted from the liner notes of Dreamboat Annie.

- Ann Wilson – lead vocals
- Nancy Wilson – electric guitar, acoustic guitar, backing vocals
- Roger Fisher – electric guitar, acoustic guitar
- Howard Leese – electric guitar, Minimoog
- Steve Fossen – bass guitar

Additional musicians

- Dave Wilson – drums
- Ray Ayotte – conga
- Mike Flicker – percussion

== Charts ==
=== Weekly charts ===
Weekly chart performance for "Magic Man"
Chart (1976–1977)	Peak position
Australia (Kent Music Report)	6
Belgium (Ultratop 50 Flanders)	10
Canada Top Singles (RPM)	26
Netherlands (Dutch Top 40)	7
Netherlands (Single Top 100)	8
New Zealand (Recorded Music NZ)	26
US Billboard Hot 100	9
US Cash Box Top 100	7

=== Year-end charts ===
1976 year-end chart performance for "Magic Man"
Chart (1976)	Position
Canada Top Singles (RPM)	186
US Cash Box Top 100	80

1977 year-end chart performance for "Magic Man"
Chart (1977)	Position
Australia (Kent Music Report)	46
Netherlands (Dutch Top 40)	66
Netherlands (Single Top 100)	77
