= Dreamboat Annie =

Studio album by Heart
- Released: September 1975 (Canada)
- Recorded: July–August 1975
- Studio: Can-Base (Vancouver)
- Genres: Hard rock; arena rock; folk rock
- Length: 40:02
- Label: Mushroom
- Producer: Mike Flicker

Heart chronology
Dreamboat Annie (1975)	Magazine (1977)

Singles from Dreamboat Annie
- 1. "How Deep It Goes" Released: April 1975; 2. "Magic Man" Released: July 1975; 3. "Crazy on You" Released: March 1976; 4. "Dreamboat Annie" Released: November 1976

Professional ratings
Review scores
Source	Rating
AllMusic	4.5/5 stars
Paste	8.8/10
Rolling Stone	Favorable
The Rolling Stone Album Guide	3/5 stars

Dreamboat Annie is the debut studio album by American rock band Heart. At the time, the band was based in Vancouver, British Columbia; the album was recorded in Vancouver and first released in Canada by the local label Mushroom Records in September 1975, eventually reaching number 20 on RPM's Top Album chart and earning a double platinum certification. It was released in the United States on February 14, 1976, through the US subsidiary of Mushroom Records in Los Angeles, peaking at number seven on the Billboard 200. It also reached the top 10 in the Netherlands and Australia in early 1977. The album contains three commercially successful singles, two of which, "Crazy on You" and "Magic Man", became staples on North American FM radio. Producer Mike Flicker helped the group to polish their sound and obtain a recording contract with the label.

== Release ==
Heart's first single, "How Deep It Goes" (backed with "Here Song"), received little attention when released in Canada by the small Mushroom label in early 1975. The second single, "Magic Man" (backed with "How Deep It Goes"), was first picked up for radio play by CJFM-FM 96 in Montreal, while the band was on tour playing small club dates.

Dreamboat Annie was released in Canada in September 1975 following the success of "Magic Man". The album cover was designed by Emily Carr University of Art and Design communication design instructor Deborah Shackleton. Heart's first radio success earned them a spot opening a Montreal concert for Rod Stewart in October 1975 which prompted sales and airplay to increase in that region and then gradually across other regions of the country, partly because Heart's recording qualified as Canadian content thereby assisting radio stations in meeting their Canadian content requirements. The album sold an impressive 30,000 copies across Canada in its first few months, eventually being certified as double platinum for sales of 200,000. Due to the gradual nature of the sales, it only entered the Canadian Albums Chart on September 4, 1976, peaking at number 20 on October 9, 1976.

Internationally, Dreamboat Annie reached number seven in the Netherlands, number nine in Australia, and number 36 in the United Kingdom. "Magic Man" was the first single in these countries, followed by "Crazy on You".

== Subsequent events ==
The success of the album indirectly led to a break between the band and label. The first cracks appeared when the group tried to renegotiate their royalty rate to be more in keeping with what they thought a platinum band should be earning. For this Michael Fisher, who was Ann Wilson's boyfriend at the time, stepped aside as de facto manager and Ken Kinnear was hired. Mushroom's tough stance in negotiations, and their opinion that perhaps the band was a one-hit wonder, led to Mike Flicker leaving the label. He did, however, continue to produce for Heart.

The relationship broke down completely when the label bought a full-page ad in Rolling Stone, mocked up like a National Enquirer front page. The ad used a photo similar to the one on the Dreamboat Annie album cover, showing Ann and Nancy back to back with bare shoulders. The caption under the photo read, "It Was Only Our First Time!" The band had not been consulted and was furious with the double meaning of the caption.

Since the label could no longer provide Flicker as producer as the contract specified, the band took the position that they were free to move to another label and signed with Portrait Records. Mushroom insisted that the band was still bound to the contract which called for two albums. So, Mushroom released Magazine with incomplete tracks, studio outtakes and live material and a disclaimer on the cover.

The band got a federal injunction to stop distribution of the 1977 edition of Magazine. Most of the initial 50,000 pressings were recalled from stores. The court eventually decided that the band could sign with Portrait, but that they did owe Mushroom a second album. The band returned to the studio to re-record, remix, edit, and re-sequence the recordings. Magazine was re-released in 1978 and sold a million copies in less than a month.

Shelly Siegel, the promoter behind the "First Time" ad and vice president of the record label, died a few months after the re-release, and Mushroom Records went bankrupt two years later. The episode had at least one more repercussion. Not long after the ad appeared, a radio promoter asked Ann about her lover; he was referring to Nancy, thus implying that the sisters were incestuous lesbian lovers. The encounter infuriated Ann who went back to her hotel and wrote the words to what became one of Heart's signature songs, "Barracuda".

== Track listing ==
All tracks are written by Ann Wilson and Nancy Wilson, except where noted.

Side one
No.	Title	Length
1.	"Magic Man"	5:28
2.	"Dreamboat Annie (Fantasy Child)"	1:10
3.	"Crazy on You"	4:53
4.	"Soul of the Sea"	6:33
5.	"Dreamboat Annie"	2:02

Side two
No.	Title	Writer(s)	Length
6.	"White Lightning & Wine"		3:53
7.	"(Love Me Like Music) I'll Be Your Song"		3:20
8.	"Sing Child"	A. Wilson; N. Wilson; Steve Fossen; Roger Fisher	4:55
9.	"How Deep It Goes"	A. Wilson	3:49
10.	"Dreamboat Annie (Reprise)"		3:50

== Personnel ==
Credits adapted from the liner notes of Dreamboat Annie.

=== Heart ===
- Ann Wilson – lead vocals (all tracks); flute (tracks 3, 8, 10); backing vocals (tracks 3, 7–9); acoustic guitar (track 9)
- Nancy Wilson – electric guitar (tracks 1, 6); acoustic guitar (tracks 1, 3, 5–7, 9, 10); backing vocals (tracks 3, 5–10); 12-string acoustic guitar, 6-string acoustic guitar (track 4)
- Roger Fisher – electric guitar (tracks 1, 3, 4, 6–9); acoustic guitar (track 1); lap steel (track 7)
- Howard Leese – electric guitar (tracks 1, 3); synthesizer (track 1); orchestral arrangements (tracks 4, 7, 9, 10); bells (track 5); orchestra bells (track 7); backing vocals (track 8)
- Steve Fossen – bass (tracks 1, 3–8, 10)
- Mike Derosier – drums (tracks 6, 8)
- Heart – arrangements

=== Additional musicians ===
- Dave Wilson – drums (track 1)
- Ray Ayotte – conga (track 1); percussion (track 4)
- Mike Flicker – percussion (track 1); timpani (track 10); arrangements
- Kat Hendrikse – drums (tracks 3–5, 7, 10)
- Rob Deans – synthesizer (tracks 3, 9); orchestral arrangements (tracks 4, 7, 9, 10); piano (tracks 9, 10)
- Geoff Foubert – backing vocals (tracks 3, 5, 7, 10); banjo (track 5)
- Tessie Bensussen – backing vocals (tracks 3, 5, 10)
- Jim Hill – backing vocals (tracks 3, 5, 10)
- Brian Newcombe – bass (track 9)
- Duris Maxwell – drums (track 9)

=== Technical ===
- Mike Flicker – production, engineering
- Mike Fisher – special direction
- Howard Leese – production assistance
- Rolf Hennemann – engineering
- Patrick Collins – mastering

=== Artwork ===
- Toby Rankin – photography
- Jim Rimmer – signature lettering
- Captain Paste-Up – layout

== Charts ==
=== Weekly charts ===
Chart (1976–1977)	Peak position
Australian Albums (Kent Music Report)	9
Canada Top Albums/CDs (RPM)	20
Dutch Albums (Album Top 100)	7
Japanese Albums (Oricon)	67
UK Albums (Official Charts)	36
US Billboard 200	7

=== Year-end charts ===
Chart (1976)	Position
US Billboard 200	49

Chart (1977)	Position
Dutch Albums (Album Top 100)	27

== Certifications ==
Region	Certification	Certified units/sales
Australia (ARIA)	Gold	20,000^{^}
Canada (Music Canada)	2× Platinum	200,000^{^}
United States (RIAA)	Platinum	1,000,000^{^}
^{^} Shipments figures based on certification alone.
