= Heart (band) =

American rock band

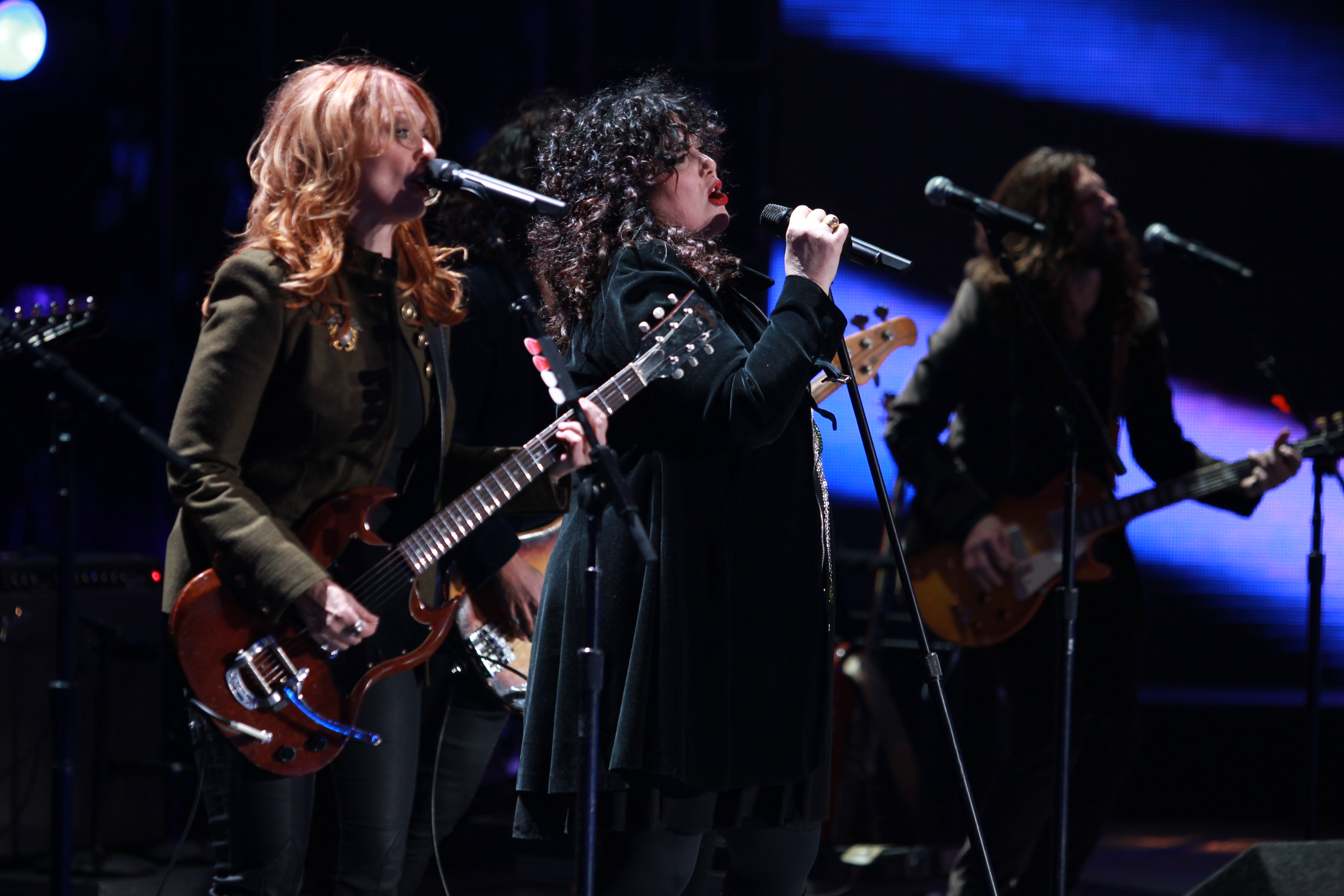
- Heart performing in December 2010 at Marine Corps Air Station Miramar in Miramar, San Diego

Background information
- Origin: Pacific Northwest (Greater Seattle, Washington, and Vancouver, British Columbia)
- Genres: Rock; hard rock; folk rock; pop rock
- Years active: 1974–1998; 2002–2016; 2019; 2023–present
- Labels: Mushroom; Epic; Sony BMG; Portrait; Legacy; EMI; Capitol; Reprise; Shout! Factory; Sovereign; Sony Legacy
- Spinoffs: Alias
- Spinoff of: The Army; Hocus Pocus; White Heart
- Members: Ann Wilson; Nancy Wilson; Ryan Waters; Ryan Wariner; Paul Moak; Tony Lucido; Sean T. Lane
- Past members: Roger Fisher; Steve Fossen; Brian Johnstone; John Hannah; Michael Derosier; Howard Leese; Mark Andes; Denny Carmassi; Denny Fongheiser; Fernando Saunders; Mike Inez; Tom Kellock; Scott Olson; Ben Smith; Gilby Clarke; Craig Bartock; Darian Sahanaja; Debbie Shair; Ric Markmann; Kristian Attard; Dan Rothchild; Chris Joyner; Dan Walker; Andy Stoller
- Website: heart-music.com

Heart is an American rock band formed in 1974 in the Pacific Northwest. The band coalesced from previous projects by founding members including the Army (1967–1969), Hocus Pocus (1969–1970), and White Heart (1970–1973). By 1975, the band’s lineup coalesced with Ann Wilson (lead vocals and flute) and Nancy Wilson (rhythm guitar, vocals), Michael Derosier (drums), Howard Leese (guitar, keyboards and backing vocals), Roger Fisher (guitar) and Steve Fossen (bass guitar). These core members were included in the band's 2013 induction into the Rock and Roll Hall of Fame.

Heart rose to fame with music influenced by hard rock and heavy metal as well as folk music. The band underwent a major lineup change between the late 1970s and the early 1980s; by 1982 Fisher, Fossen, and Derosier all had left and were replaced by Mark Andes (bass) and Denny Carmassi (drums). Though the band's popularity fell off during the initial years with the new lineup, they staged a comeback in the mid-1980s, buoyed by major radio hits which continued into the 1990s. Heart disbanded in 1998, although they have regrouped and resumed touring and recording multiple times since then, with the Wilson sisters being the only consistent members. Heart's Top 40 singles include "Magic Man" (1975), "Crazy on You" (1976), "Barracuda" (1977), "Tell It Like It Is" (1980), "What About Love" (1985), "Never" (1985), "Who Will You Run To" (1987), and "All I Wanna Do Is Make Love to You" (1990), along with no. 1 hits "These Dreams" (1986) and "Alone" (1987).

Heart has been nominated for four Grammy Awards and has sold over 50 million records worldwide, including approximately 22.5 million albums in the United States. They have placed top-ten albums on the Billboard 200 in the 1970s, 1980s, 1990s, and 2010s. Heart was ranked 57th on VH1's "100 Greatest Artists of Hard Rock" and 49th on Ultimate Classic Rock's Top 100 Classic Rock Artists.

== History ==
=== 1967–1972: Early bands and formation ===
In 1965, bassist Steve Fossen formed the Army, along with Roger Fisher on guitar, Don Wilhelm on guitar, keyboards and lead vocals, and Ray Schaefer on drums. They played for several years in and around the Bothell, Washington, area, northeast of Seattle. They frequently played Bothell High School, Inglemoor High School, and Shorecrest High School, as well as many taverns and club venues. In 1969, the band went through lineup changes (Gary Ziegelman—former lead singer of Buffalo Clancy—on lead vocals, Fisher on guitar, Fossen on bass, James Cirrello on guitar, Ron Rudge on drums, and Ken Hansen on percussion) and took on a new name, Hocus Pocus.

The name White Heart came from a discussion Roger Fisher's brother Mike Fisher had with Michael Munro, who had come up with the name White Hart (without the "e" – a reference to Arthur C. Clarke's Tales from the White Hart) for a band with Toby Cyr on lead guitar. Fisher asked and received permission to use the name for the Army, but shifted the spelling and meaning from the animal "hart" to the homophonic organ "heart"; Army became White Heart. For a brief time in 1970, this lineup shortened its name to Heart. The band subsequently went through more personnel changes. In 1971, White Heart consisted of Steve Fossen, Roger Fisher, David Belzer (keys), and Jeff Johnson (drums). The band eventually stuck to the name Heart, which has been their name since 1973.

Mike Fisher was set to be drafted into the army. Nancy Wilson said that when he did not report for duty, his home was raided, he slipped out a rear window, escaped to Canada, and became a Vietnam War "draft dodger". On a day in 1971 or 1972, Fisher crossed the border to visit family, and by chance met Ann at a Hocus Pocus (or White Heart) show. According to Nancy, that meeting was "when she and Michael fell in love" and Ann decided to follow Mike back to Canada. Steve Fossen finished his college education before he also decided to move to Canada in late 1972, and Fisher followed in late 1972 or early 1973. With the addition of Ann, Brian Johnstone (drums), and John Hannah (keyboards), the band Heart was officially formed. Ann's sister Nancy Wilson joined in 1974, and soon after that became romantically involved with Fisher.

=== 1975–1976: Commercial breakthrough ===
The group played numerous shows around their new home in Vancouver, British Columbia, and they recorded a demo tape with the assistance of producer Mike Flicker and session-guitarist and keyboard player, Howard Leese. Hannah and Johnstone had left by then and soon after Leese became a full-time member. Flicker produced the band's first five albums. The team recorded the debut album, Dreamboat Annie, at Can-Base Studios in Vancouver, later known as Mushroom Studios. Mike Derosier eventually joined Heart as full-time drummer. Some of the same Canadian investors who had backed the studio also backed a separate company called Mushroom Records, which was managed by Shelly Siegel.

The album was picked up by Siegel and sold 30,000 copies in Canada within the first few months of its release in September 1975. Sales were assisted by the band opening a Rod Stewart concert at the Montreal Forum in Montreal in October, a gig they were offered a day before the concert when the previously scheduled opening act canceled. The radio success of "Magic Man" led concert organizers to offer the spot to Heart. The band flew from the West Coast of Canada to Montreal overnight for the performance. Siegel soon released the album in the U.S. Helped by two hit singles in 1976 ("Crazy on You" and "Magic Man", which reached No. 35 and 9, respectively, on the Billboard Hot 100), it reached number 7 on the Billboard 200. It eventually sold over a million copies.

=== 1977–1979: Mainstream success and band split ===
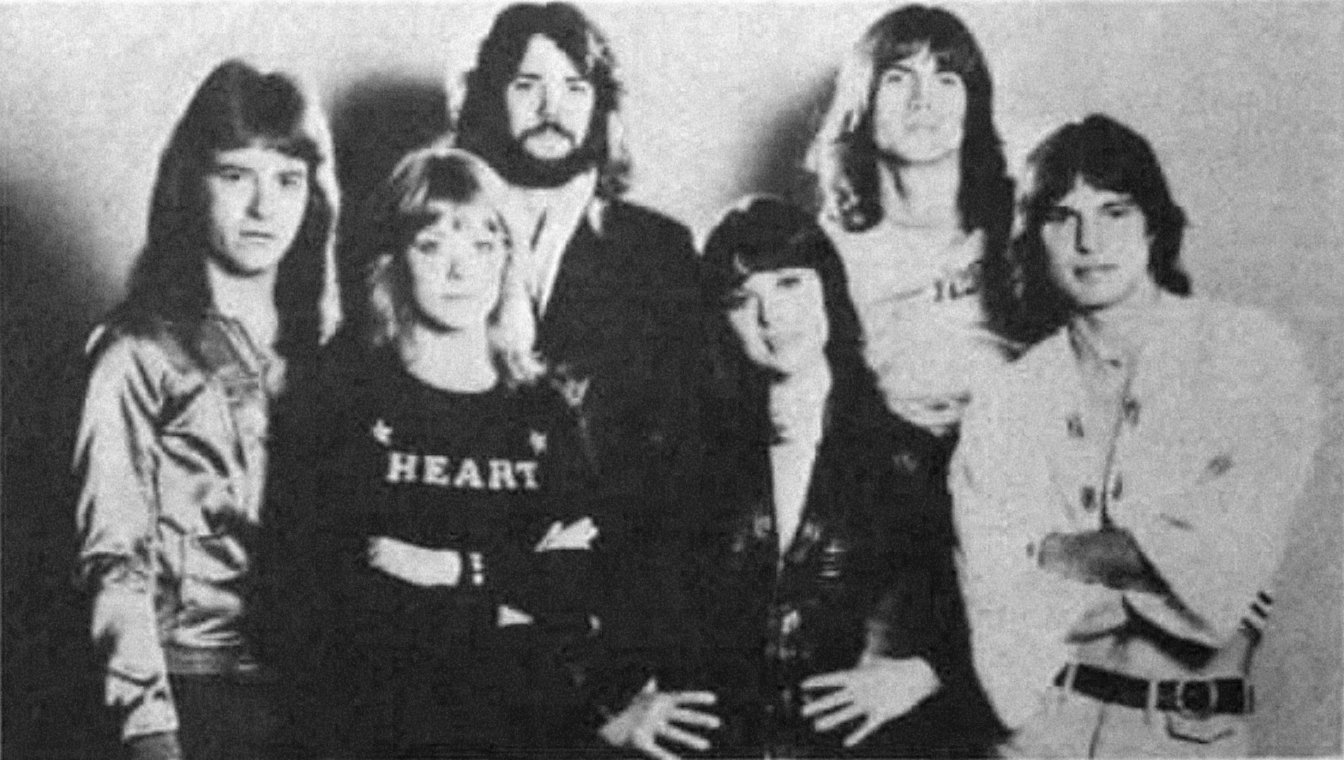
Promo photo of Heart in 1977

In 1977, Mushroom Records ran a full-page advertisement showing the bare-shouldered Wilson sisters (as on the Dreamboat Annie album cover) with the suggestive caption, "It was only our first time!" In a July 1977 Rolling Stone cover story, the sisters cited this advertisement as a key reason for their decision to leave Mushroom Records. Heart broke its contract with Mushroom and signed a contract with CBS subsidiary Portrait Records, resulting in a prolonged legal battle with Siegel. Mushroom released the partly completed Magazine in early 1977, just before Portrait released Little Queen. Each company attempted to prevent the other from releasing any Heart music. A court in Seattle forced Mushroom Records to recall the album so that Heart could remix tracks and add new vocals, and the album was re-released in 1978. It peaked at number 17 in the US, generating the single "Heartless", which reached number 24 in the charts. The album eventually achieved platinum status.

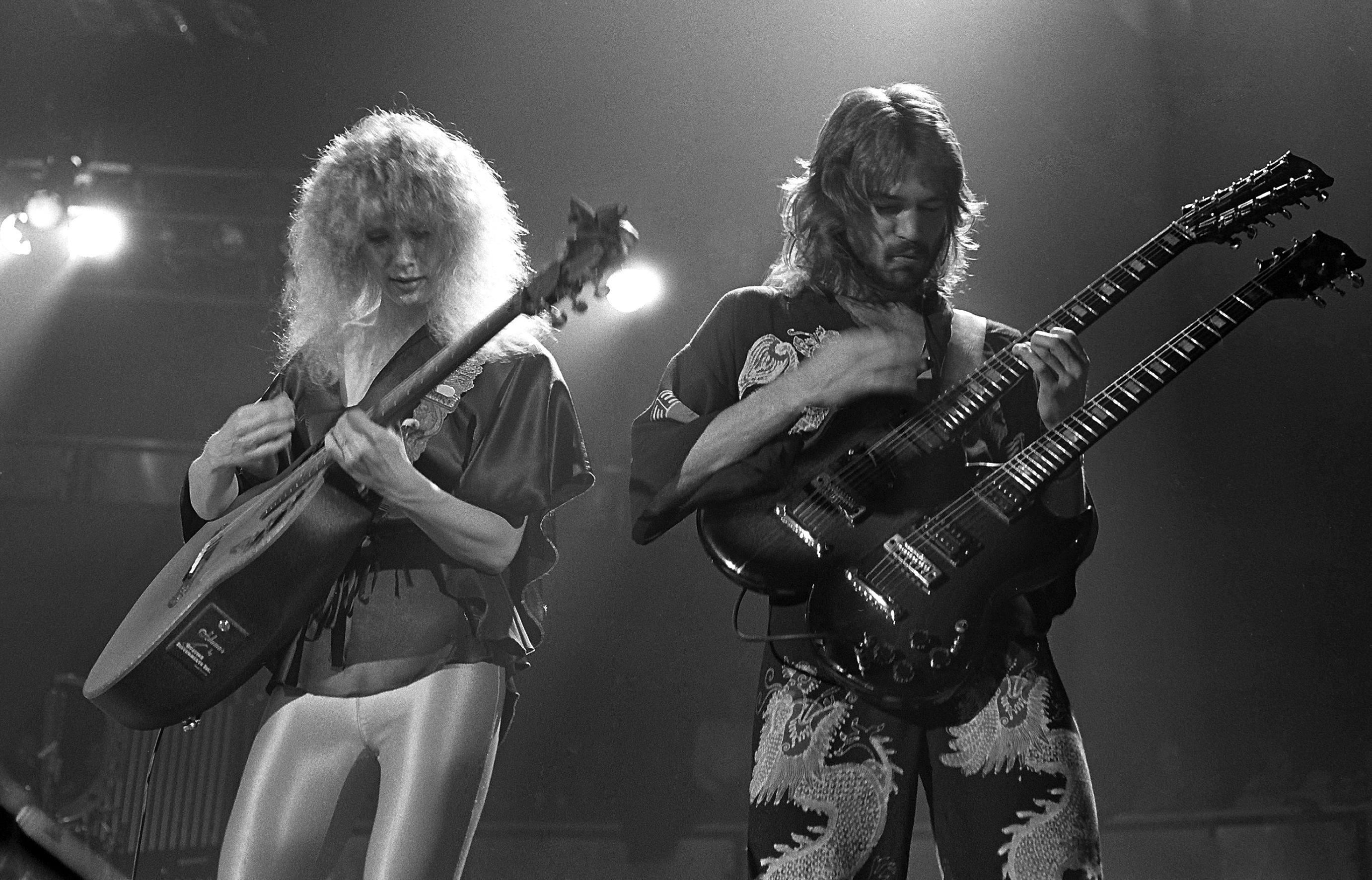
Nancy Wilson and Roger Fisher onstage, 1978

Little Queen became Heart's second million-seller and featured the hit "Barracuda" (number 11). The song's lyrics were written by an infuriated Ann Wilson in her hotel room after a reporter had suggested that the sisters were lesbian lovers.

In late 1978, the double-platinum Dog & Butterfly peaked at No. 17 on the Billboard 200 and produced hits with its title song (No. 34) and "Straight On" (No. 15). In 1979, the Wilson-Fisher liaisons ended—Roger Fisher was voted out of the band by the other members, and his brother Mike left the group’s orbit within a month.

=== 1980–1984: Commercial decline ===
Heart released Bebe le Strange in 1980. It became the band's third top-10 album, peaking at No. 5, and yielded a top-40 hit "Even It Up"; however, it sold less than half of the number of copies of the last album. The band embarked on a 77-city tour to promote the album. By the end of the year, the band scored its highest-charted single at the time, a version of the ballad "Tell It Like It Is", which peaked at No. 8. In November 1980, the double album Greatest Hits/Live was released and reached number twelve on the U.S.. chart, eventually achieving double-platinum status, but only more than a decade later. The two-disc set featured studio versions of most of Heart's singles to date, plus a few new studio tracks and six live tracks, among which were versions of "Unchained Melody", Led Zeppelin's "Rock and Roll" and the Beatles' "I'm Down".

Heart was the first band of the day to appear at the sold-out concert headlined by Queen at Elland Road on May 29, 1982. Their next album, Private Audition (1982), provided the minor hit "This Man Is Mine" (No. 33) and was the first not produced by Mike Flicker. Initially, the band turned to Jimmy Iovine, one of the leading producers of the time, who suggested that the material lacked potential hits, and eventually, the Wilson sisters produced the album themselves. The track "Perfect Stranger" foreshadowed the power ballads that would dominate the band's mid-1980s sound.

At the end of recording, Derosier and Fossen were fired from the band. They were replaced by Denny Carmassi on drums and Mark Andes on bass for Passionworks (1983), while at the record company's insistence, the band turned to established producer Keith Olsen. Both Private Audition and Passionworks had relatively poor sales, failing to reach gold status. Despite the albums' sales, the single "How Can I Refuse" was a success, reaching number one on the Billboard Mainstream Rock Chart.

=== 1985–1990: Comeback ===
The band moved to Capitol Records and their first album for the label was simply titled Heart (1985). The move to Capitol coincided with a glam metal makeover that included minimizing the acoustic and folk sounds characteristic of their early work. The album reached number one, sold five million copies, and launched four top-10 hits: "What About Love" (number 10, 1985), "Never" (No. 4, 1985), the chart-topping "These Dreams" (1986) and "Nothin' at All" (number 10, 1986). A fifth single, "If Looks Could Kill", also charted, giving the band five hit singles from the same album for the first time.

Heart's next album, Bad Animals (1987), continued the move away from the band's folk and acoustic leanings towards a glossier arena rock sound. The lead single, the power ballad "Alone", became Heart's most successful song, spending three weeks at No. 1 on the Billboard Hot 100, while also hitting number 2 on the Billboard Adult Contemporary chart and No. 3 on the Mainstream Rock Tracks chart. "Alone" placed as the number 2 song for the year on the Hot 100. It also peaked at No. 1 in Canada and No. 3 in the UK, made the Top 10 in Australia and several countries in northern Europe, and made the Top 20 in Germany. It is often considered to be Heart's greatest pop song.

The other two singles were the up-tempo rocker "Who Will You Run To", which reached number 7 on the Hot 100 and No. 2 on the Mainstream Rock Tracks chart, and "There's the Girl", with Nancy singing lead, which reached No. 12 and 16 on the same charts respectively. They were not as successful in other markets aside from "Who Will You Run To" making the Top 20 in Canada and "There's the Girl" peaking in the top 15 in Poland. Bad Animals was a Top 3 hit in the US and Canada, being certified 3× and 4× platinum in those countries, respectively. The album also became Heart's first Top 10 album on the UK Albums Chart.

The success of UK top-40 singles "Alone" (No. 3), "Who Will You Run To" (No. 30), "There's the Girl" (No. 34) and the Bad Animals album (No. 7) sparked renewed UK interest in the 1985 self-titled album, resulting in the re-release of several singles. When originally released in 1985, the singles "What About Love" and "Never" did not chart, while "These Dreams" and "Nothin' at All" only charted at 68 and 76 respectively. However, in 1988 after the success of Bad Animals a re-released double A-side single of "Never"/"These Dreams" hit No. 8, "What About Love" hit No. 14, and the re-release of "Nothin' at All" cracked the UK Top 40 at No. 38. This success in the UK would continue with future albums and help Heart become a major concert attraction in the United Kingdom.

In 1990, Brigade became the band's sixth multi-platinum LP and added three more top-25 Billboard Hot 100 hits. "Stranded" reached No. 13 and "I Didn't Want to Need You" peaked at No. 23. The lead single, "All I Wanna Do Is Make Love to You", reached No. 2, and created controversy over whether the song encouraged women to endanger themselves by picking up hitchhikers. Two other album cuts, "Wild Child" (No. 3) and "Tall, Dark Handsome Stranger" (No. 24), were Billboard Mainstream Rock chart hits. Brigade was the band's highest-charting album in the UK, reaching No. 3.

=== 1991–2001: The Lovemongers, Desire Walks On, and Nancy Wilson hiatus ===
Heart released its first complete live album in the autumn of 1991. Rock the House Live! largely featured tracks from Brigade rather than more familiar hits in an effort to capture the harder rock side of the band. The album's single, a version of John Farnham's "You're the Voice", received moderate airplay on rock stations and hit No. 20 on the Mainstream Rock chart. The Wilson sisters then put together an informal acoustic group called Lovemongers with longtime Heart songwriting collaborator Sue Ennis and Frank Cox. Heart returned in 1993 with Desire Walks On, on which bass player Andes was replaced with Fernando Saunders. The album peaked at No. 48 on the Billboard 200, eventually being certified gold. The lead track, "Black on Black II", was an AOR hit peaking at No. 4 on Billboard's Mainstream Rock chart, while the single "Will You Be There (In the Morning)" was a moderate pop hit, reaching No. 39 on the Billboard Hot 100. A third single, "The Woman In Me", hit No. 24 on the Adult Contemporary chart, but missed the Hot 100.

"Desire Walks On" marked the first time that Heart's singles fared better in other countries than the US. Aside from the metallic hard rock radio cut "Black on Black II" which reached the Top 10 on US Rock / Hard Rock charts, "Will You Be There (In the Morning)" hit No. 19 in the UK and No. 8 in Canada. (vs. No. 39 in the U.S.) and "The Woman in Me" reached No. 13 in Canada after just missing the US Billboard Hot 100.

An interactive CD-ROM, Heart: 20 Years of Rock & Roll, with five hours of audio footage, was released in 1994. The next album, The Road Home (1995), offered live acoustic versions of the group's best-known songs and was produced by Led Zeppelin's John Paul Jones. In 1995, Nancy Wilson decided to take a break from music to concentrate on having a family.

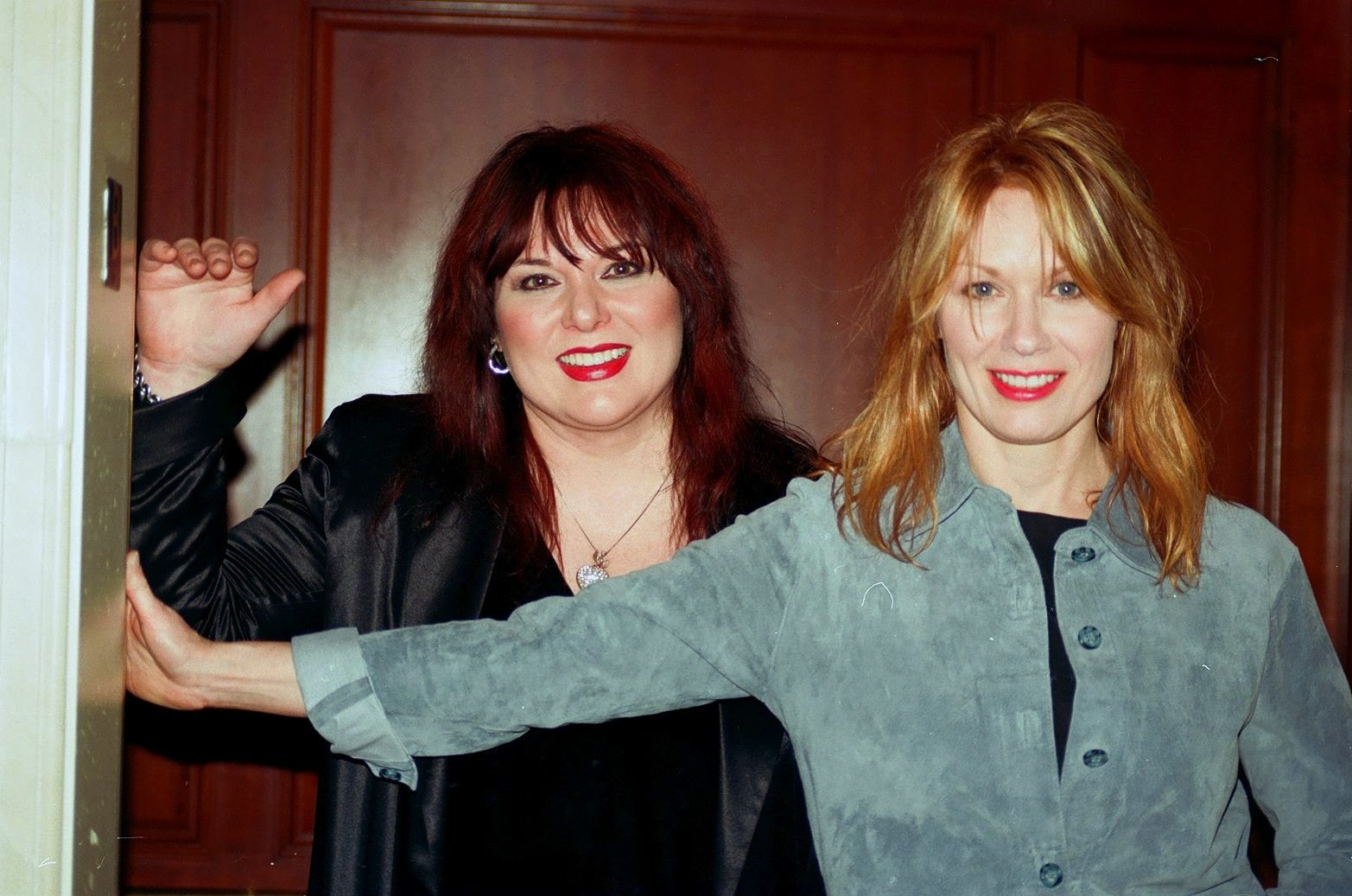
Ann and Nancy Wilson at the Four Seasons Hotel in Washington, D.C., March 1998

In 1998, the band maintained its profile by being the subject of an episode of VH1's Behind the Music. The band released a Greatest Hits boxed set covering their early work. A second volume focusing on the later part of their career came out in 2000. Lovemongers released a live EP of cover songs titled Battle of Evermore in 1992, a full-length album titled Whirlygig in 1997, and a collection of mostly self-penned Christmas songs titled Here is Christmas in 1998. In 2001, Here Is Christmas was re-released presented by Heart as Heart Presents a Lovemongers' Christmas.

=== 2002–2006: Resumption of touring ===
In 2002, Ann and Nancy returned to the road with a brand-new Heart lineup including Scott Olson, Ben Smith, Alice in Chains bassist Mike Inez, and keyboardist Tom Kellock. In 2003, Heart released a DVD of the band's last stop in the tour as Alive in Seattle. Also in 2003, Gilby Clarke (ex-Guns N' Roses) and Darian Sahanaja replaced Olson and Kellock for an American tour. In 2004, with Clarke having been replaced by Craig Bartok, Heart released Jupiters Darling, the first studio album since 1993. It featured a variety of songs that included a return to Heart's original hard-rock sound, as well as a blend of vintage pop and new textures.

In 2005, the Wilsons appeared on the CMT Music Awards as a special guest of country singer Gretchen Wilson (no relation) and performed the Heart classic "Crazy on You" with her. Heart also performed with Gretchen Wilson on VH-1's March 10, 2006, tribute to the band, "Decades Rock Live!". The special featured Alice in Chains, Phil Anselmo, Dave Navarro, Rufus Wainwright, and Carrie Underwood. The concert was released on LP, CD, DVD, and Blu-ray on January 25, 2019, with the title Live in Atlantic City. Later in 2019, bass player Inez left Heart rejoining the reformed Alice in Chains.

=== 2007–2009: VH1 Rock Honors to touring with Journey ===
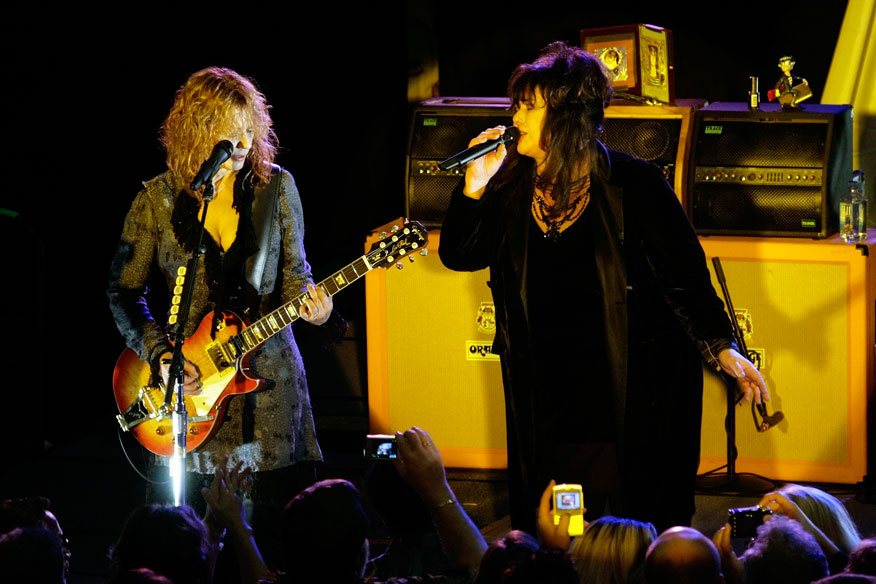
Nancy and Ann Wilson in July 2007

Heart was honored at the second annual VH1 Rock Honors (May 24, 2007) and also performed along with Ozzy Osbourne, Genesis, and ZZ Top. Gretchen Wilson and Alice in Chains honored the group by performing "Barracuda". In September 2007, Ann Wilson released her first solo album, Hope & Glory, which featured her sister Nancy, Elton John, Alison Krauss, k.d. lang, Wynonna Judd, Gretchen Wilson, Wainwright, Shawn Colvin, and Deana Carter.

On April 9, 2008, the band appeared on Idol Gives Back with Stacy "Fergie" Ferguson, who sang "Barracuda" in harmony with Ann. In mid-2008, Heart undertook a U.S. tour with Journey and Cheap Trick. It was named the "Human 2008" tour. Also in 2008, the band performed in a benefit for music education in public schools, appearing live with Jackson Browne on "Something Fine," with Venice on "Crazy on You," and with over 70 members of the Santa Monica High School orchestra and girls' choir on "Bohemian Rhapsody." In 2009, the band was featured on an updated and remastered episode of VH1's Behind the Music.

=== 2010–2012: Red Velvet Car to Kennedy Center Honors ===
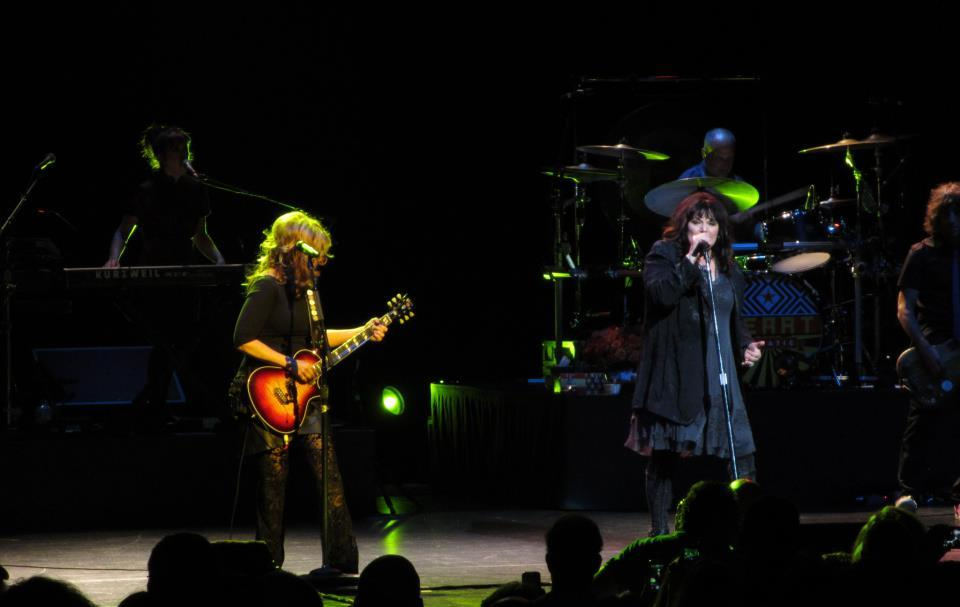
Heart performing at the Beacon Theatre in Manhattan, New York, October 2012

A new studio album, Red Velvet Car, was released in 2010. It marked a stylistic return to Heart's melodic hard rock and folk sound of their early albums. The album peaked at No. 10 on the Billboard 200, becoming the group's first top-10 album in 20 years. It also went to No. 3 on Billboard's Rock Albums Chart. Red Velvet Car spawned two singles. The folky "Hey You" peaked at No. 26 on Billboard's AC chart, while the hard rocker "WTF" peaked at No.19 on Billboard's Hot Rock Songs chart.

In November 2010, Heart announced it would do its first cross-Canada tour in 30 years, beginning on January 28, 2011, in St. John's, Newfoundland and Labrador. A live DVD and Blu-ray disc, A Night at Sky Church, recorded before the tour at the Experience Music Project in Seattle, was released in 2011. Ann and Nancy Wilson played as part of the 2010 VH1 Divas Support the Troops, along with acts including Katy Perry and Paramore; they performed "Crazy on You" with Grace Potter and the Nocturnals. In May 2010, a reunion of former male members of the band, including Fisher and Fossen, performed at the Synergia Northwest concert in Tacoma, Washington.

Heart embarked on a 2011 summer tour co-headlining with Def Leppard. A career-spanning box-set titled Strange Euphoria was released in June 2012, containing many of the band's biggest hits, unreleased demos and rare live cuts. On September 18, 2012, the Wilson sisters released their autobiography, Kicking and Dreaming: A Story of Heart, Soul, and Rock and Roll, which was co-written with Charles R. Cross (Heavier Than Heaven: A Biography of Kurt Cobain). On September 25, 2012, Ann and Nancy received a star on the Hollywood Walk of Fame for their contributions to music.

The band released its 14th studio album, Fanatic, on October 2, 2012, which became the group's 12th top-25 album (No. 24, 2012) and was supported by a tour of the US and Canada. On December 26, 2012, Ann and Nancy performed at the Kennedy Center Honors in a tribute to Led Zeppelin televised on CBS. Along with an orchestra and two choirs (arranged by Rob Mathes), drummer Jason Bonham (the son of John Bonham, the late Led Zeppelin drummer), and guitarist Shane Fontayne, they performed a version of Led Zeppelin's signature song "Stairway to Heaven". Their rendition of "Stairway" earned a standing ovation from the crowd and tears of joy from Robert Plant. The "Stairway" video was viral on YouTube, with over four million views in the first five days after the show, and prompted the Kennedy Center to issue a limited-edition iTunes single of the performance. Although the single was available for only two weeks, it immediately went to No. 1 on the iTunes Rock Singles chart and reached No. 20 on Billboard's Hot Rock Songs chart.

=== 2013–2016: Rock and Roll Hall of Fame and Beautiful Broken ===
At the Rock and Roll Hall of Fame induction ceremony on April 18, 2013, the original members of Heart (the Wilson sisters, Howard Leese, Michael Derosier, Steve Fossen, and Roger Fisher) reunited for the first time in 34 years to play "Crazy on You". The band was inducted by Chris Cornell, who emotionally talked about what heroes and role models Ann and Nancy Wilson had been to him and other musicians in Seattle, saying, "For me, and for countless other men and women, they have earned, at long last, their rightful place in the Rock and Roll Hall of Fame." In 2014, the band released another live album, Fanatic Live from Caesar's Colosseum, which peaked at number 13 on Billboard's Top Hard Rock Albums Chart.

Heart released the album Beautiful Broken on July 8, 2016. The hard-rocking title cut featuring Metallica's James Hetfield trading vocals with Ann Wilson was the first single. Beautiful Broken was No. 9 on Billboard's Rock Album Chart and No. 30 on Billboard's Top Selling Albums Chart. Immediately after the album's release, the band embarked on the Rock Hall Three for All, a 30-date headlining tour of the U.S. with Joan Jett and Cheap Trick supporting.

=== 2016–present: Hiatus, side projects, and reunion ===
On the morning of August 27, 2016, Ann's husband Dean Wetter was arrested and then pleaded guilty to assaulting Nancy's 16-year-old twin sons after the boys had left the door to his RV open. The incident took place during a Heart performance at the White River Amphitheater in Auburn, Washington, the previous night. Although the band played the remaining 2016 tour dates which were already booked, the Wilson sisters only spoke to one another through third parties for the remainder of the tour. The pair's relationship was strained by the incident; an April 2017 article in Rolling Stone reported that they had not spoken to one another since the 2016 tour ended and only sporadically contacted one another through text messaging. After the end of the tour in October 2016, the sisters opted to tour with their own side-project bands. In April 2017, both sisters said the band had not permanently disbanded with Ann saying they were simply on hiatus.

In February 2019, Heart announced their hiatus had ended and they would embark on the Love Alive tour in the summer. In March 2019, both sisters reunited on stage for the first time since the band went on hiatus, at the Love Rock NYC benefit concert. Although Ann and Nancy were reuniting, the former Heart members who had joined Nancy's solo effort were not invited back, and the new lineup consisted of Ann's touring band replacing Ben Smith on drums, Dan Rothchild on bass, and Chris Joyner on keyboards. In June 2019, the band announced the Love Alive tour had been extended through October 2019. In 2022, Nancy Wilson announced her own version of Heart, called Nancy Wilson's Heart. She has toured under that name since then, playing a list consisting primarily of Heart songs.

In the last few days of December 2023, Heart played together for the first time in four years, with two concerts in California followed by a New Year's Eve concert in Seattle, and Ann Wilson's band Tripsitter as backup musicians. On New Year's Day, they performed "Barracuda" and "Magic Man" during the first intermission at the 2024 NHL Winter Classic in Seattle. On January 29, 2024, Heart announced their 2024 Royal Flush World Tour would play several dates with Cheap Trick, Def Leppard, Journey, and Squeeze. The summer 2024 UK and Europe dates were canceled because Ann Wilson had undergone a medical procedure in late May, which was later revealed to be the removal of a cancerous growth. Heart continued to tour in North America in 2025.

In August 2026, Nancy Wilson announced that Heart was finishing up work on a new studio album, and that a documentary, a world tour, and biopic were also on the way.

== Legacy ==
Heart is generally considered a hard rock band, but its diversity has crossed multiple genres from folk to pop to hard rock, and even at times heavy metal. As a result, the band has had singles chart on Billboard's Hot 100, Mainstream Rock Tracks, Hard Rock Tracks, and Adult Contemporary charts. Their 2016 live recording at the Royal Albert Hall in London with the Royal Philharmonic Orchestra even charted in the top 10 of Billboard's Classical Albums chart and Classical Crossover Albums chart.

Heart has sold over 35 million records worldwide, had 20 top-forty singles and seven top-ten albums, and earned four Grammy nominations. The band charted singles and top-ten albums on the Billboard charts in the 1970s, 1980s, 1990s and 2010s: a four-decade span of top-ten albums that is a record for a female-fronted band. Heart was ranked on VH1's "100 Greatest Artists of Hard Rock" in 2008, and Ann and Nancy Wilson ranked number 40 (in 1999) on VH1's "100 Greatest Women in Rock and Roll". Ann Wilson was ranked in Hit Parader's 2006 "Greatest Heavy Metal Vocalists of All Time". In 2009, the Wilson sisters were awarded ASCAP's Founders Award in recognition of their songwriting careers.

In 2011, Heart earned its first nomination for induction into the Rock and Roll Hall of Fame for the 2012 class. After being passed over, the band was nominated again the following year announced as inductees to the 2013 class on December 11, 2012. Their Hall of Fame page says the Wilson sisters are the first women to front a hard-rock band, and "pioneers" inspiring "women to pick up an electric guitar or start a band". In his book Heart: In the Studio, Jake Brown said that the band was beginning "a revolution for women in music... breaking genre barriers and garnering critical acclaim".

"Heart were the first female-fronted band I heard and was influenced by," recalled Lzzy Hale of Halestorm. "I heard Heart and was like, 'Oh, singing like that as a girl is actually a thing!'" The Wilson sisters have been active in the Seattle music scene for decades and influenced many musicians from the region, including bands of the grunge era. Artists who used their Bad Animals Studio include Neil Young, R.E.M., Pearl Jam, Soundgarden, and Alice in Chains.

== Members ==
=== Current members ===
- Ann Wilson – lead and backing vocals, flute, autoharp, acoustic guitar, piano, maracas (1973–1998, 2002–2016, 2019, 2023–present)
- Nancy Wilson – rhythm, lead and acoustic guitar, backing and lead vocals, harmonica, mandolin, keyboards (1974–1995, 1998, 2002–2016, 2019, 2023–present)
- Ryan Waters – lead and rhythm guitar, backing vocals (2019, 2023–present)
- Ryan Wariner – lead and rhythm guitar, backing vocals (2023–present)
- Paul Moak – keyboards, rhythm and lead guitar, backing vocals (2023–present)
- Tony Lucido – bass (2023–present)
- Sean T. Lane – drums (2023–present)

== Discography ==
- Dreamboat Annie (1975)
- Magazine (1977)
- Little Queen (1977)
- Dog and Butterfly (1978)
- Bébé le Strange (1980)
- Private Audition (1982)
- Passionworks (1983)
- Heart (1985)
- Bad Animals (1987)
- Brigade (1990)
- Desire Walks On (1993)
- Heart Presents a Lovemongers' Christmas (2001)
- Jupiters Darling (2004)
- Red Velvet Car (2010)
- Fanatic (2012)
- Beautiful Broken (2016)

== Awards and nominations ==
=== Grammy Awards ===
| Year | Nominee / work | Award | Result |
|---|---|---|---|
| 1986 | Heart | Best Rock Performance by a Duo or Group with Vocal | Nominated |
| 1988 | "Alone" | Best Pop Performance by a Duo or Group | Nominated |
| 1988 | Bad Animals | Best Rock Performance by a Duo or Group with Vocal | Nominated |
| 1991 | "All I Wanna Do Is Make Love To You" | Best Pop Performance by a Duo or Group | Nominated |
| 2023 | Ann and Nancy Wilson | Grammy Lifetime Achievement Award | Won |
