= Howard Leese =

American guitarist and record producer (born 1951)

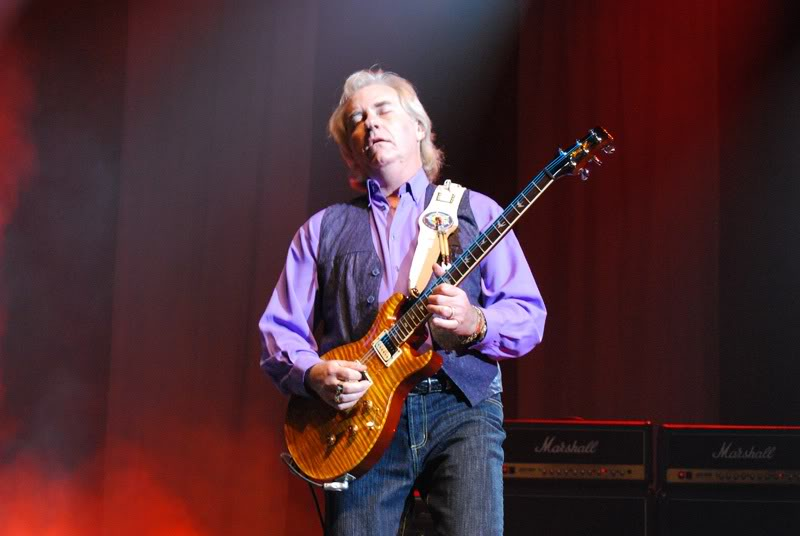
- Howard on stage with The Paul Rodgers Band in 2009

Background information
- Born: Howard M. Leese; June 13, 1951 (age 75); Hollywood, Los Angeles, California, U.S.
- Genres: Rock; hard rock
- Occupations: Guitarist; producer; singer; songwriter; musical director
- Instruments: Guitar; mandolin; keyboards; bass; percussion; accordion; vocals
- Years active: 1966–present

Howard M. Leese (born June 13, 1951) is an American guitarist, record producer, and musical director who played with Heart as guitarist and keyboardist for 23 years (1975 through 1998). He continues to record and tour as a solo artist, and as guitarist with The Paul Rodgers Band and Bad Company. In 2013, he was inducted into the Rock and Roll Hall of Fame as a member of Heart.

== Career ==
Howard received his inspiration to pick up the guitar during the 1960s after seeing Dick Dale, the guitarist in the surf band "the Del-Tones", and feeling the excitement from his playing. He studied violin and music theory at the City College, Los Angeles, and also played in a band called The Zoo.

Leese had his first recording contract with Ed Cobb's Sunburst label at the age of 15, as the band The Zoo with friend and drummer Mike Flicker. Later, when Flicker went to work for Jack Herschorn at Mushroom Studios in Vancouver, Leese went with him as a production manager. While there, he and Shelly Siegel started Mushroom Records.

It was at Mushroom Studios in 1974 that Leese helped produce a demo for Heart. The next year, Mushroom Records signed Heart and released the group's first album Dreamboat Annie which Flicker produced. Leese was assistant producer on the album, and was asked to join the band later that year. He played with the band until 1998, when the Wilson sisters put the band on hiatus for several years to pursue other projects and devote more time to their personal lives. Leese was Heart's guitarist, backing vocalist, keyboard player (best known for playing the Mini-Moog solo on the hit song "Magic Man") and song arranger. Aside from the Wilson sisters, Leese was the longest serving member of Heart.

In 1998 he joined the Paul Rodgers Band and continued to tour with them as with Bad Company.

As of May 2013, when not touring, Howard was performing in Raiding the Rock Vault which originated at the LVH Hotel, but moved to residency at Vinyl at the Hard Rock Hotel and Casino and then to the Rio Hotel in Las Vegas.

He splits his time between homes in Malibu, California and Kent, Washington, as of 2013.

== Solo career ==
2009 saw the release of Leese's first solo effort, Secret Weapon, through Frontiers Records. The disc included special guest appearances by Joe Lynn Turner, Paul Rodgers, Jimi Jamison and Keith Emerson.

== Instruments ==
Howard is a longtime player and endorser of Paul Reed Smith Guitars. In 2009, Paul Reed Smith announced and launched the "Howard Leese Limited Edition Golden Eagle" in tribute to the No. 1 guitar that he played on stage for over 15 years. In the late 1970s, he performed live with the rare Sardonyx guitar.

Howard has used and endorsed Toadworks guitar effects since 2004. In January 2009, ToadWorks USA released the Howard Leese Signature Model analog flanger named Barracuda, after the Heart song of the same name.

== HML Guitars ==
HML Guitars was founded in 1994 by Howard Leese. As a woodworker and luthier, he participated in all aspects of construction as well as quality control. HML guitars were totally hand-built in Seattle by luthier Jack Pimentel. Pimentel has continued to build hand-crafted custom guitars under his own brand JP Guitars.

== Albums ==
The Zoo

- The Zoo Presents Chocolate Moose (1968) – by The Zoo

Mad Dog

- Dawn of the Seventh Sun (1969) – by Mad Dog

Heart

- Dreamboat Annie (1975)
- Little Queen (1977)
- Magazine (1978)
- Dog and Butterfly (1978)
- Bebe Le Strange (1980)
- Private Audition (1982)
- Passionworks (1983)
- Heart (1985)
- Bad Animals (1987)
- Brigade (1990)
- Desire Walks On (1993)
- The Road Home (1995)

Dixon House Band

- Fighting Alone (1979)
- Masked Madness (1981)

Paul Rodgers

- Paul Rodgers: Live in Glasgow (2007)

Bad Company

- Hard Rock Live (2010)
- Live at Wembley (2011)

Solo

- Secret Weapon (2009) – With Keith Emerson and Paul Rodgers.

Others

- Randy Meisner (1982) – by Randy Meisner
- The Thirteenth Dream (aka Spirit of '84) (1984) – by Spirit
- Dangerous Curves (1991) – by Lita Ford
- There Must Be A Place (1993) – by Bananafish
- The Yellow Album by The Simpsons. Lead & rhythm guitar on "Sisters Are Doin' It For Themselves"
- Rockstar (2023) - by Dolly Parton, special guest on the song "Magic Man"
