= Mike Flicker =

American music producer in Los Angeles

- Born: 1950 (age 75–76)
- Instrument: Drum

Mike Flicker (born 1950) is an American music producer in Los Angeles who has numerous credits on music and film projects. He is critically acclaimed for his work with Heart.

== Early career ==
Flicker's career began at age sixteen in Los Angeles when his band, The Zoo, was given a contract in 1968 by Bell Records (which later became Arista Records). They were one of the youngest groups ever signed to a major label at that time. The Zoo included Flicker on drums along with Howard Leese on guitar and keyboards.

After relocating to Vancouver, British Columbia in 1971, Flicker was hired as chief engineer at Aragon Studios (later renamed Mushroom Studios), which became the premier state-of-the-art studio in western Canada.

1975 proved to be a fateful year for Flicker with his discovery, signing, and production of the band Heart. Flicker received the Canadian Juno Award for Producer of the Year for his production on Heart's debut album, Dreamboat Annie.

== Producer ==
Flicker established himself as a major independent producer with artists that included Poco, Al Stewart, Randy Meisner, Nantucket, Wendy Waldman, Heart and Trooper, one of the five top-selling Canadian bands of all time.

Flicker's diverse career in the music, technology and film-television industries culminated in the 1991 formation of Mike Flicker Music Services, where he continues to contribute his leadership in successful service to the film, television and ancillary entertainment industries.

== Personal life ==
On June 18, 2006, Flicker was married to Lyudmila Bateryakova, who was born in Penza, Russia. She is called Luda, the Russian diminutive of Lyudmila, by her family and friends. They have two children: daughter Samantha (from a previous marriage) and son Anton born in 1992.

== See also ==
- Howard Leese
- American film producers
- American record producers
