= Roger Fisher (guitarist) =

American guitarist

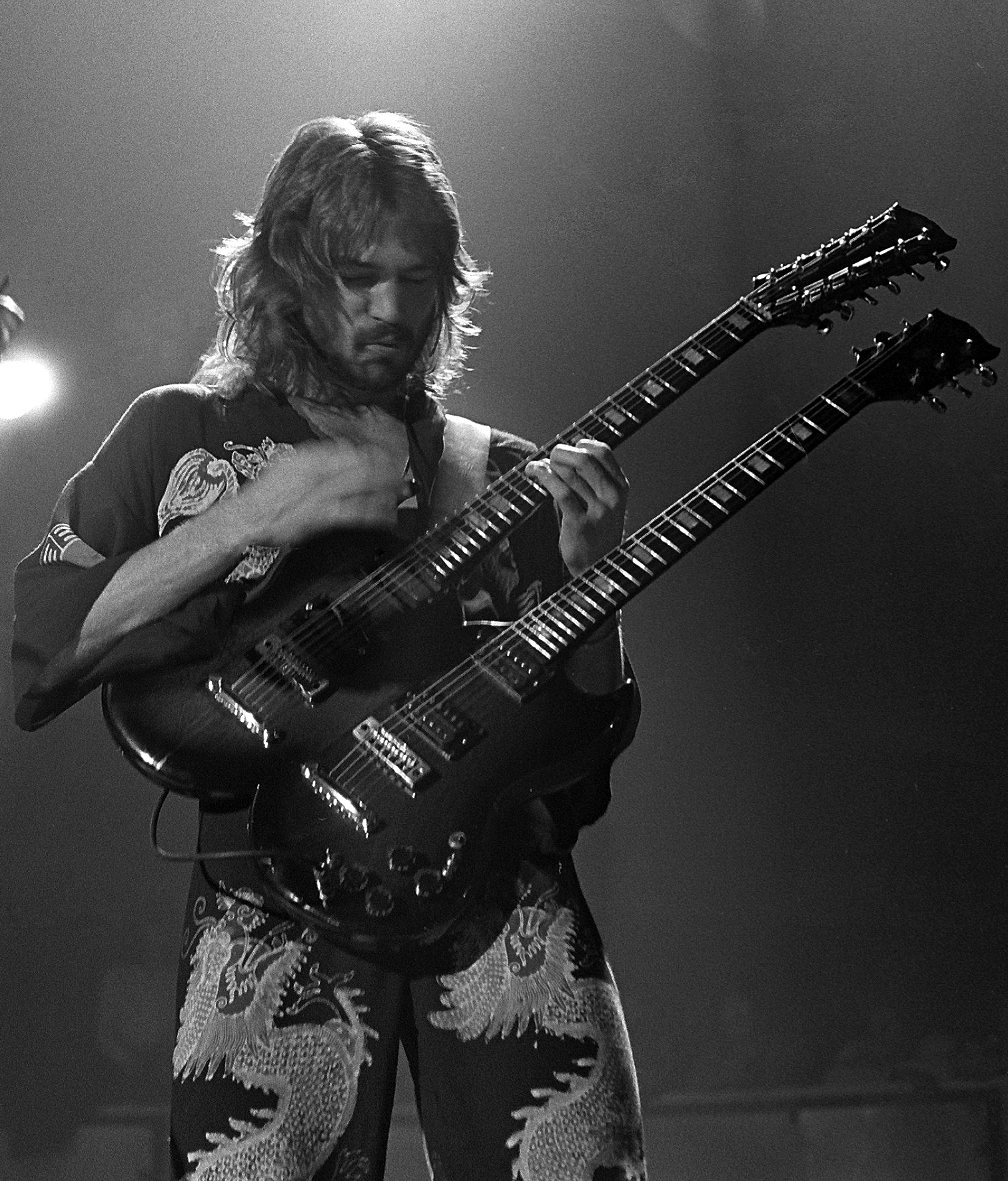
- Fisher in 1978

Background information
- Born: February 14, 1950 (age 76); Seattle, Washington, U.S.
- Genres: Rock music, hard rock, folk rock, Pop music, AOR
- Occupations: Musician, songwriter
- Instrument: Guitar
- Years active: 1967–present
- Labels: Mushroom, Capitol, Portrait, Epic, EMI Canada, MCA
- Website: rogerfisher.com

Roger Fisher (born February 14, 1950) is an American guitarist primarily known as one of the founding members of the band Heart. His tenure lasted from 1967 until 1980. In 2013 Fisher was inducted into the Rock and Roll Hall of Fame as a member of Heart.

== Career ==
The band Heart started out as Army in 1967 in Seattle, Washington, formed by bassist Steve Fossen and brothers Roger and Michael Fisher. The group went by the names Army, Hocus Pocus, and White Heart before settling on just Heart in the mid-1970s. Ann Wilson joined the band in 1970 and Nancy in 1974; romances sprang up between the Fisher brothers and Wilson sisters, with Mike dating Ann and Roger dating Nancy.

Heart rose to fame following the release of their debut album, Dreamboat Annie, in 1976. Follow-up albums Little Queen, Magazine, and Dog and Butterfly also sold well. Following the release of the Dog and Butterfly album, the Roger Fisher / Nancy Wilson romance came to an end. In October 1979, Fisher quit the band.

In 1990, Roger Fisher formed the band Alias with vocalist Freddy Curci and guitarist Steve DeMarchi, who were previously members of the Canadian rock band Sheriff; the other two musicians were fellow ex-Heart members Steve Fossen on bass and Mike Derosier on drums. Alias had a few hits, most notably in 1990 with the song "More Than Words Can Say", which in 2005 resurfaced in a Subway sandwich commercial. Alias toured extensively through 1990. The band also performed twice on The Tonight Show Starring Johnny Carson, once with Johnny Carson and once with Jay Leno. The group disbanded in the early 1990s while touring to promote their album.

Fisher continues his musical career. He has recorded two solo albums and has collaborated with many musicians in the Pacific Northwest USA, including session/touring percussionist Matthew Burgess. He was also involved with a group called "Clever Bastards". Fisher moved with his family from Washington State to Prague, Czech Republic, in 2007. As of September 2008, however, he resides in Monroe, Washington.

In 2013, Fisher was inducted into the Rock and Roll Hall of Fame as a member of Heart.

== Discography ==
Heart

- 1976 : Dreamboat Annie
- 1977 : Little Queen
- 1977 : Magazine
- 1978 : Dog and Butterfly

Alias

- 1990 : Alias
- 2009 : Never Say Never

Solo

- 1990 : Standing, Looking Up
- 2000 : Evolution – Fisher plays guitar, sitar, bouzouki, percussion, bass guitar and lead vocals; produced by Roger & Mike Fisher
- 2016 : All Told – as Roger Fisher and the Human Tribe
- 2018 : Heart of the Blues – as Roger Fisher and the Human Tribe
