= Steve Fossen =

American bass guitarist

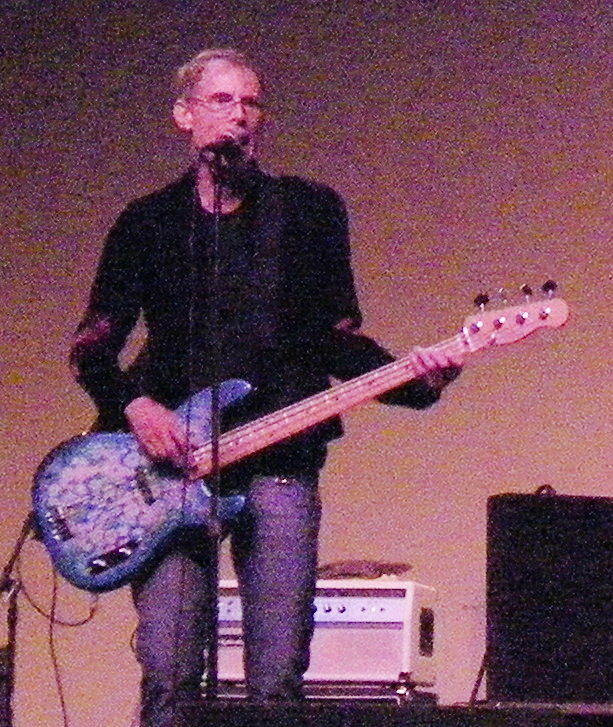
Fossen performing with Café Authors

Steve Fossen (born November 15, 1949) is an American bassist and a founding member of the band Heart.

== Early life ==
Fossen was born on November 15, 1949 in Seattle, Washington, son of Fern and Norman Fossen. His mother was a nurse and his father served during World War II in the Signal Corps and then was a Merchant Marine stationed in Japan. He attended Inglemoor High School, during which he began working as a musician in the Kenmore and Bothell area of Washington with his friend Roger Fisher. Fisher's older brother Mike was their manager and arranged for gigs and negotiated for gainful compensation.

== Career ==
Fossen began playing bass professionally in 1965. In 1967, he and schoolmate Roger Fisher started the band that would become Heart. Ann Wilson joined the group in 1971 followed by her sister Nancy two years later. After completing the band's sixth album Private Audition in 1982, Fossen and Michael DeRosier left the group due to mismanagement and "creative differences". Fossen was inducted into the Rock and Roll Hall of Fame on April 18, 2013, as a member of Heart.

Fossen and his current group Heart By Heart, with former Heart drummer Michael DeRosier continue to perform the songs that made the members of Heart famous. He has also been a member of Café Authors.
