= Black Hole Sun =

1994 single by Soundgarden

Single by Soundgarden

from the album Superunknown
- B-side: "Like Suicide" (acoustic); "Kickstand" (live)
- Released: May 23, 1994
- Studio: Bad Animals (Seattle, Washington)
- Genre: Psychedelic rock; grunge; alternative rock; hard rock; stoner rock
- Length: 5:18
- Label: A&M
- Songwriter: Chris Cornell
- Producers: Michael Beinhorn; Soundgarden

Soundgarden singles chronology
| "The Day I Tried to Live" (1994) | "Black Hole Sun" (1994) | "My Wave" (1994) |

Music video
- "Black Hole Sun" on YouTube

"Black Hole Sun" is a song by American rock band Soundgarden. Written by frontman Chris Cornell, the song was released on May 23, 1994, by A&M Records as the third single from the band's fourth studio album, Superunknown (1994). Considered to be the band's signature song, it topped the US Billboard Album Rock Tracks chart, where it spent a total of seven weeks at number one. Despite peaking at number two on the Billboard Modern Rock Tracks chart, "Black Hole Sun" became the number-one modern rock track of 1994. Worldwide, the single reached the top 10 in Australia, Canada, France, and Ireland, while in Iceland, it reached number one.

The single's accompanying music video was directed by Howard Greenhalgh and received the award for MTV Best Metal/Hard Rock Video at the 1994 MTV Video Music Awards. "Black Hole Sun" was included on Soundgarden's 1997 greatest hits album A-Sides; it also appeared on the 2010 compilation album Telephantasm. In 2021, Rolling Stone magazine ranked "Black Hole Sun" number 368 on their list of the 500 Greatest Songs of All Time.

== Origin and recording ==
"Black Hole Sun" was written by frontman Chris Cornell. In 1994, Cornell explained the song's origins to Uncut Magazine:

I wrote it in my head driving home from Bear Creek Studio in Woodinville, a 35–40 minute drive from Seattle. It sparked from something a news anchor said on TV and I heard wrong. I heard 'blah blah blah black hole sun blah blah blah'. I thought that would make an amazing song title, but what would it sound like? It all came together, pretty much the whole arrangement including the guitar solo that's played beneath the riff. I spent a lot of time spinning those melodies in my head so I wouldn't forget them. I got home and whistled it into a Dictaphone. The next day I brought it into the real world, assigning a couple of key changes in the verse to make the melodies more interesting. Then I wrote the lyrics and that was similar, a stream of consciousness based on the feeling I got from the chorus and title.

Cornell said that he wrote the song in about 15 minutes. He used a Gretsch guitar to write the song, and commented, "I wrote the song thinking the band wouldn't like it—then it became the biggest hit of the summer." Cornell came up with the song while using a Leslie speaker. Guitarist Kim Thayil said that the Leslie model 16 speaker was perfect for the song as "it's very Beatlesque and has a distinctive sound. It ended up changing the song completely." Thayil said that the song "wasn't safe as milk, but it wasn't glass in someone's eye either. It was the spoonful of sugar that helps the medicine go down. Now it's the 'Dream On' of our set." The song was performed in a slightly sharp drop D tuning, similar to the tuning used on the band's first single, "Hunted Down". Drummer Matt Cameron called the song "a huge departure". It was produced by Michael Beinhorn and the recording engineer was Brendan O'Brien.

Appearing on The Pods & Sods Network in July 2017, Beinhorn detailed the process of recording Superunknown and shared his reaction to first hearing "Black Hole Sun": "I think for the rest of my entire life, until I draw my last breath, I'll never ever forget how I felt when they started playing that song. From the very first few notes, I felt like I'd been hit by a thunderbolt. I was just absolutely stunned. What in the world is this? I get goosebumps thinking about it now."

== Composition ==
"Black Hole Sun" sample
"With its weepy, vibrato-guitar arpeggios and spare drums, the verses on 'Black Hole Sun' pave the way for a gloriously pounding metallic chorus."

Musically, "Black Hole Sun" has been described as grunge, psychedelic rock, alternative rock, hard rock, and stoner rock. Regarding the song's lyrics, Cornell stated, "It's just sort of a surreal dreamscape, a weird, play-with-the-title kind of song." He also said that "lyrically it's probably the closest to me just playing with words for words' sake, of anything I've written. I guess it worked for a lot of people who heard it, but I have no idea how you'd begin to take that one literally." In another interview he elaborated further, stating, "It's funny because hits are usually sort of congruent, sort of an identifiable lyric idea, and that song pretty much had none. The chorus lyric is kind of beautiful and easy to remember. Other than that, I sure didn't have an understanding of it after I wrote it. I was just sucked in by the music and I was painting a picture with the lyrics. There was no real idea to get across." Commenting upon how the song was misinterpreted as being positive, Cornell said, "No one seems to get this, but 'Black Hole Sun' is sad. But because the melody is really pretty, everyone thinks it's almost chipper, which is ridiculous." When asked about the line, "Times are gone for honest men", Cornell said:

It's really difficult for a person to create their own life and their own freedom. It's going to become more and more difficult, and it's going to create more and more disillusioned people who become dishonest and angry and are willing to fuck the next guy to get what they want. There's so much stepping on the backs of other people in our profession. We've been so lucky that we've never had to do that. Part of it was because of our own tenacity, and part of it was because we were lucky.

== Critical reception ==
Greg Prato of AllMusic called the song "one of the few bright spots" of mid-1994, when "the world was still reeling from Nirvana frontman Kurt Cobain's suicide the previous April". He said, "The song had a psychedelic edge to it (especially evident in the verse's guitar part), as the composition shifted between sedate melodicism and gargantuan guitar riffs. The lyrics were classic Chris Cornell—lines didn't exactly make sense on paper but did within the song." Larry Flick from Billboard magazine praised it as "a magnificent pop single", noting that "track's resonant production highlights its moving, Beatlesque quality without sacrificing band's visceral punch." Ann Powers of Blender proclaimed that "Cornell's fixation with the Beatles pays off with the hit single 'Black Hole Sun' ". In his weekly UK chart commentary, James Masterton wrote, "Easily the most commercial single the US band have released to date". Alan Jones from Music Week gave it four out of five and named it Pick of the Week, adding, "Heavily plugged by MTV, this single has a fat, full sound, with some psychedelic edges invading the band's usual grungey sound. lt is a light, disciplined and melodic hit." Jon Pareles of The New York Times said, "The Beatles' techniques—fuzz-toned low chords, legato lead-guitar hooks and lumpy Ringo Starr-style drumming...are linked to Lennon-style melody in 'Black Hole Sun'." Roger Morton from NME named it "the best moment" from their album, "a melodramatic downer ballad, whose bleakness is offsett by some curious psychedelic guitar figures." J.D. Considine of Rolling Stone stated, "With its yearning, Lennonesque melody and watery, Harrison-style guitar, 'Black Hole Sun' is a wonderful exercise in Beatleisms; trouble is, it's not a very good song, offering more in the way of mood and atmosphere than melodic direction." Roy Wilkinson from Select noted "the descending corkscrew melody" of the song.

The solo for "Black Hole Sun", performed by Thayil, was ranked number 63 on Guitar World's list of the "100 Greatest Guitar Solos", and number 56 on Total Guitar's list of the "100 Hottest Guitar Solos". The song was included on VH1's countdown of the "100 Greatest Songs of the '90s" at number 25. It was also included on VH1's countdown of the "100 Greatest Hard Rock Songs" at number 77. According to Nielsen Music's year-end report for 2019, "Black Hole Sun" was the ninth most-played song of the decade on mainstream rock radio with 125,000 spins. All of the songs in the top 10 were from the 1990s. In 2017, Billboard ranked the song number four on their list of the 15 greatest Soundgarden songs, and in 2021, Kerrang ranked the song number one on their list of the 20 greatest Soundgarden songs.

== Commercial performance ==
"Black Hole Sun" was released as a single in mid-1994. It became the most successful song from Superunknown on American rock charts and became the band's best-known song overall. On the Billboard Mainstream/Top 40 chart, it peaked at number nine during its eighth week and remained on the chart until its 20th week. The song peaked at number one on the Billboard Album Rock Tracks chart, where it spent a total of seven weeks at number one. It also peaked at number two on the Billboard Modern Rock Tracks chart and was ranked the number-one modern rock track of 1994. At the 1995 Grammy Awards, "Black Hole Sun" received the award for Best Hard Rock Performance and received a nomination for Best Rock Song.

Outside the United States, the single was released in Australia, France, Germany, and the United Kingdom. In Canada, the song reached the top 10 on the RPM 100 Hit Tracks chart. It remained in the top 10 for three weeks and became the band's highest-charting song in Canada. "Black Hole Sun" reached the UK top 20 and was the last single from the album that charted in the UK top 20; it remains the band's highest-charting single in the UK. "Black Hole Sun" debuted at number 10 in Australia but quickly descended the chart; however, widespread airplay and a promotional visit to Australia stimulated a resurgence of interest in Superunknown. "Black Hole Sun" would peak at number six on the Australian Singles Chart. "Black Hole Sun" reached the top 30 in Germany, the Netherlands, and New Zealand, and was a top-10 success in France and Ireland. It topped the Icelandic Singles Chart for a week and was a moderate top-20 success in Sweden. The single has sold over three million copies worldwide.

== Music video ==
The surreal and apocalyptic music video for "Black Hole Sun" was directed by British video director Howard Greenhalgh, produced by Megan Hollister for Why Not Films (London, England), shot by Ivan Bartos, and features post-production work by 525 Post Production (Hollywood, California) and Soho 601 Effects (London). The video follows a suburban neighborhood and its vain inhabitants with grotesquely exaggerated grins, who are eventually swallowed up when the Sun suddenly turns into a black hole, while the band performs the song somewhere in an open field. In the video, Cornell is wearing a fork necklace given to him by Shannon Hoon of Blind Melon. In an online chat, the band stated that the video "was entirely the director's idea", and added, "Our take on it was that at that point in making videos, we just wanted to pretend to play and not look that excited about it." They said that the video was one of the few Soundgarden videos the band was satisfied with.

The video premiered on MTV's late-night alternative rock program 120 Minutes on June 12, 1994. After several weeks of airplay on MTV, a second version of the video was substituted containing more elaborate visual effects than the original, including the addition of a computer-generated black hole. "Black Hole Sun" became a hit on MTV and received the award for Best Metal/Hard Rock Video at the 1994 MTV Video Music Awards. In the same year, it was nominated for Best Clip of the Year in the category for Alternative/Modern Rock at the 1994 Billboard Music Video Awards. In 1995, it received the Clio Award for Alternative Music Video. The video is available on the CD-ROM Alive in the Superunknown.

== Accolades ==
| Publication | Country | Accolade | Year | Rank |
|---|---|---|---|---|
| Guitar World | United States | "100 Greatest Guitar Solos" | 2007 | 63 |
| VH1 | United States | "100 Greatest Songs of the '90s" | 2007 | 25 |
| VH1 | United States | "100 Greatest Hard Rock Songs" | 2008 | 77 |
| Robert Dimery | United States | 1001 Songs You Must Hear Before You Die | 2010 | * |
| Rolling Stone | United States | "500 Greatest Songs of All Time" | 2021 | 368 |
| Kerrang! | United Kingdom | "100 Greatest Singles of All Time" | 2002 | 49 |
| Q | United Kingdom | "The 1001 Best Songs Ever" | 2003 | 543 |
| Total Guitar | United Kingdom | "100 Hottest Guitar Solos" | 2006 | 56 |
| The Movement | New Zealand | "The 100 (+300) Greatest Songs of All Time" | 2004 | 80 |
| The Movement | New Zealand | "The 77 Best Singles of the 90s" | 2004 | 32 |
| Pure Pop | Mexico | "The 100 Best Singles of All Time" | 2003 | 100 |
| Spex | Germany | "Singles of the Year" | 1994 | 15 |
| Rock & Pop | Chile | "Rock&Pop 20 Años 200 Canciones" | 2013 | 174 |

* denotes an unordered list.

== Track listing ==
All songs were written by Chris Cornell except where noted.

CD (Europe and Germany)

1. "Black Hole Sun" – 5:18
2. "Like Suicide" (acoustic) – 6:11
3. "Kickstand" (live) (Cornell, Kim Thayil) – 1:58
  - Recorded live on August 20, 1993, at Jones Beach Amphitheater in Wantagh, New York

CD (Europe)

1. "Black Hole Sun" – 5:18
2. "Jesus Christ Pose" (live) (Matt Cameron, Cornell, Ben Shepherd, Thayil) – 7:19
  - Recorded live on August 11, 1993, at Rushmore Plaza Civic Center in Rapid City, South Dakota
3. "My Wave" (live) (Cornell, Thayil) – 4:34
  - Recorded live on August 20, 1993, at Jones Beach Amphitheater in Wantagh, New York
4. "Spoonman" (Steve Fisk remix) – 6:55

Box set (UK)

1. "Black Hole Sun" – 5:18
2. "Beyond the Wheel" (live) – 5:56
  - Recorded live on August 18, 1993, at Exhibition Stadium in Toronto, Canada
3. "Fell on Black Days" (live) – 4:45
  - Recorded live on August 16, 1993, at Pine Knob Music Theatre in Clarkston, Michigan
4. "Birth Ritual" (demo) (Cornell, Cameron, Thayil) – 5:50

CD (Australia and Germany)

1. "Black Hole Sun" – 5:18
2. "Jesus Christ Pose" (live) (Cameron, Cornell, Shepherd, Thayil) – 7:19
3. "Beyond the Wheel" (live) – 5:54
  - Recorded live on August 18, 1993, at Exhibition Stadium in Toronto, Ontario, Canada

7-inch vinyl (UK) and cassette (UK)

1. "Black Hole Sun" – 5:18
2. "My Wave" (live) (Cornell, Thayil) – 4:34
  - Recorded live on August 20, 1993, at Jones Beach Amphitheater in Wantagh, New York
3. "Beyond the Wheel" (live) – 5:54
  - Recorded live on August 18, 1993, at Exhibition Stadium in Toronto, Ontario, Canada

7-inch vinyl (US)

1. "Black Hole Sun" – 5:18
2. "Spoonman" – 4:06

== Personnel ==
Personnel are taken from the liner notes of Superunknown.

Soundgarden

- Chris Cornell – vocals, rhythm guitar
- Kim Thayil – lead guitar
- Ben Shepherd – bass
- Matt Cameron – drums

== Charts ==
=== Weekly charts ===
1994 weekly chart performance for "Black Hole Sun"
| Chart (1994) | Peak position |
|---|---|
| Australia (ARIA) | 6 |
| Australia Alternative (ARIA) | 1 |
| Belgium (Ultratop 50 Flanders) | 37 |
| Canada Top Singles (RPM) | 5 |
| Denmark (Hitlisten) | 16 |
| Europe (Eurochart Hot 100) | 24 |
| Finland (Suomen virallinen lista) | 13 |
| France (SNEP) | 10 |
| Germany (GfK) | 26 |
| Iceland (Íslenski Listinn Topp 40) | 1 |
| Ireland (IRMA) | 7 |
| Israel (Israeli Singles Chart) | 14 |
| Mexico International (Notitas Musicales) | 3 |
| Netherlands (Dutch Top 40) | 31 |
| Netherlands (Single Top 100) | 25 |
| New Zealand (Recorded Music NZ) | 22 |
| Quebec Airplay (ADISQ) | 8 |
| Scottish Singles Sales (Official Charts) | 11 |
| Sweden (Sverigetopplistan) | 19 |
| UK Singles (Official Charts) | 12 |
| UK Singles (MRIB) | 12 |
| UK Network Singles (Music Week) | 29 |
| UK Rock & Metal Singles (CIN) | 1 |
| US Radio Songs (Billboard) | 24 |
| US Alternative Airplay (Billboard) | 2 |
| US Mainstream Rock Airplay (Billboard) | 1 |
| US Pop Airplay (Billboard) | 9 |
| US Cash Box Top 100 | 25 |

2017 weekly chart performance for "Black Hole Sun"
| Chart (2017) | Peak position |
|---|---|
| US Digital Song Sales (Billboard) | 41 |
| US Hot Rock & Alternative Songs (Billboard) | 5 |

=== Year-end charts ===
1994 year-end chart performance for "Black Hole Sun"
| Chart (1994) | Position |
|---|---|
| Australia (ARIA) | 62 |
| Canada Top Singles (RPM) | 48 |
| Iceland (Íslenski Listinn Topp 40) | 8 |
| Latvia (Latvijas Top 40) | 22 |
| Netherlands (Single Top 100) | 92 |
| Sweden (Topplistan) | 83 |
| UK Singles (OCC) | 144 |
| US Album Rock Tracks (Billboard) | 2 |
| US Modern Rock Tracks (Billboard) | 1 |

2017 year-end chart performance for "Black Hole Sun"
| Chart (2017) | Position |
|---|---|
| US Hot Rock Songs (Billboard) | 53 |

=== Decade-end charts ===
Decade-end chart performance for "Black Hole Sun"
| Chart (2010–2019) | Position |
|---|---|
| US Mainstream Rock (Nielsen Music) | 9 |

== Certifications ==
Certifications and sales for "Black Hole Sun"
| Region | Certification | Certified units/sales |
|---|---|---|
| Australia (ARIA) | Gold | 35,000^{^} |
| Brazil (Pro-Música Brasil) | Gold | 30,000^{‡} |
| Denmark (IFPI Danmark) | Gold | 45,000^{‡} |
| Italy (FIMI) | Gold | 25,000^{‡} |
| New Zealand (RMNZ) | 4× Platinum | 120,000^{‡} |
| Spain (Promusicae) | Gold | 30,000^{‡} |
| United Kingdom (BPI) | Platinum | 600,000^{‡} |
^{^} Shipments figures based on certification alone.^{‡} Sales+streaming figures based on certification alone.

== Release history ==
Release dates and formats for "Black Hole Sun"
| Region | Date | Format(s) | Label(s) | Ref. |
|---|---|---|---|---|
| United States | May 23, 1994 | Radio | A&M | |
| Australia | July 4, 1994 | CD; cassette | A&M; Polydor | |
| United Kingdom | August 8, 1994 | 7-inch vinyl; CD; CD box set; cassette | A&M | |
| Japan | August 10, 1994 | CD | A&M | |

== Cover versions ==
Many notable lounge music cover versions have been recorded. The Moog Cookbook's 1996 home organ bossa nova version, described as "retro futurist cocktail music" and "Cyborg Lounge", gained a cult popularity, earning plays in the 1990s on alternative radio and on MTV's the Chillout Zone. "Weird Al" Yankovic included portions of the song in his medley "The Alternative Polka" on 1996's Bad Hair Day.

Appearing on the 1997 compilation album Lounge-A-Palooza, Steve and Eydie's Las Vegas–style lounge cover was praised by many. Chris Cornell was particularly fond of their version, and also Paul Anka's 2005 cover. In 2006, Cibo Matto released a lounge-tinged version in the French language, described by AllMusic as "wonderfully loopy".

Parody lounge singer Richard Cheese covered the song in 2015, following other covers by artists such as Guns N' Roses, Norah Jones and Peter Frampton. Country singers Cody Jinks and Paul Cauthen interpreted the song as a "plaintive piano ballad" in 2017, shortly after Cornell's death.

Stripping the song down even further, Game of Thrones composer Ramin Djawadi arranged an instrumental version of the song for the pilot episode of HBO's Westworld in 2016. In the series, a number of rock classics are reimagined for the futuristic theme park's automaton saloon piano.

In 2026, during the live quarterfinals of America's Got Talent season 21 the eventual winner, the Thai singer and guitarist Nene Royal, performed a dramatic version of the song which won her the golden buzzer from Mel B. Vicky Cornell, Cornell's widow, praised Nene's performance, describing it as an exceptional rendition and an honour to her late husband.

== In popular culture ==
The track has appeared in a few musical performance games. "Black Hole Sun" is on the base set list for the original Rock Band game. It is featured in the popular Singstar karaoke franchise's 90s edition, released in 2008.

Guitar Hero: Warriors of Rock features the song in its downloadable content library, and it is a playable track in the TV mode of Guitar Hero Live.

The Soundgarden recording appeared on a number of soundtracks, including TV series For All Mankind, NCIS: Origins, Goosebumps, Roswell, New Mexico, Family Guy, The Blacklist, The Vampire Diaries, and Beavis & Butthead. It also appeared in films, including Young Adult, Lost Boys: The Tribe, and A Walk Among The Tombstones.

YA author David Macinnis Gill named the first book of his Hell's Cross series after the track. A number of lesser known sci-fi novels also carry the same name.
