= The Day I Tried to Live =

1994 single by Soundgarden

Single by Soundgarden

from the album Superunknown
- B-side: "Like Suicide" (acoustic); "Kickstand" (live)
- Released: April 18, 1994
- Studio: Bad Animals (Seattle, Washington)
- Genre: Grunge
- Length: 5:19
- Label: A&M
- Songwriter: Chris Cornell
- Producers: Michael Beinhorn; Soundgarden

Soundgarden singles chronology
"Spoonman" (1994)	"The Day I Tried to Live" (1994)	"Black Hole Sun" (1994)

Music video
- "The Day I Tried to Live" on YouTube

"The Day I Tried to Live" is a song by American rock band Soundgarden. Written by frontman Chris Cornell, "The Day I Tried to Live" was released in April 1994 as the second single from the band's fourth studio album, Superunknown (1994). The song peaked at number 13 on the Billboard Album Rock Tracks chart and number 25 on the Modern Rock Tracks chart. The song was included on Soundgarden's 1997 greatest hits album, A-Sides.

== Composition ==
"The Day I Tried to Live" was written by frontman Chris Cornell. The guitar tuning, as with many Soundgarden songs, is unorthodox: E-E-B-B-B-B (from lowest to highest string). The song has a dissonant atmosphere and is also notable for its changing time signatures. For much of the song, there is a cycle of one measure of 7/4, then two of 4/4. Guitarist Kim Thayil has said that Soundgarden usually did not consider the time signature of a song until after the band had written it, and said that the use of odd meters was "a total accident."

== Lyrics ==
Cornell on "The Day I Tried to Live":

It's about trying to step out of being patterned and closed off and reclusive, which I've always had a problem with. It's about attempting to be normal and just go out and be around other people and hang out. I have a tendency to sometimes be pretty closed off and not see people for long periods of time and not call anyone. It's actually, in a way, a hopeful song. Especially the lines "One more time around/Might do it", which is basically saying, 'I tried today to understand and belong and get along with other people, and I failed, but I'll probably try again tomorrow.' A lot of people misinterpreted that song as a suicide-note song. Taking the word "live" too literally. "The Day I Tried to Live" means more like the day I actually tried to open up myself and experience everything that's going on around me as opposed to blowing it all off and hiding in a cave.

— Chris Cornell

== Release and reception ==
"The Day I Tried to Live" was released as a single in 1994, but was rather underpromoted when compared to "Spoonman" or "Black Hole Sun" from the same album. The song peaked at number 13 on the Billboard Mainstream Rock Tracks chart and number 25 on the Billboard Modern Rock Tracks chart. Outside the United States, the single was released in Spain and the United Kingdom. In Canada, "The Day I Tried to Live" charted on the Alternative Top 30 chart, where it peaked at number 27 and stayed there for two weeks.

== Music video ==
The music video for "The Day I Tried to Live" was directed by Matt Mahurin. The video features a man apparently dressed as a hospital patient floating around a bedroom and appearing alone and dazed in various city scenes. It also features the band performing the song in a boiler room. After the first chorus, the band members are shown with their instruments ablaze. The video was released in April 1994. The video is available on the CD-ROM Alive in the Superunknown.

== Cover versions ==
"The Day I Tried to Live" was covered by Between the Buried and Me on the band's 2006 covers album, The Anatomy Of.

The song was also covered by American rock band Sevendust on their thirteenth studio album, Blood & Stone (2020).

== Track listing ==
All songs were written by Chris Cornell.

UK 7-inch vinyl and cassette

1. "The Day I Tried to Live" – 5:20
2. "Like Suicide" (acoustic) – 6:12

== Charts ==
Chart (1994–1995)	Peak position
Canada Rock/Alternative (RPM)	27
UK Singles (Official Charts)	42
US Mainstream Rock (Billboard)	13
US Alternative Airplay (Billboard)	25

== Certifications ==
Region	Certification	Certified units/sales
New Zealand (RMNZ)	Gold	15,000^{‡}
^{‡} Sales+streaming figures based on certification alone.
