= Spoonman =

1994 single by Soundgarden

Single by Soundgarden

from the album Superunknown
- B-side: "Cold Bitch"
- Released: February 7, 1994
- Studio: Bad Animals (Seattle, Washington)
- Genre: Grunge; hard rock; alternative rock
- Length: 4:06
- Label: A&M
- Songwriter: Chris Cornell
- Producers: Michael Beinhorn; Soundgarden

Soundgarden singles chronology
"Rusty Cage" (1992)	"Spoonman" (1994)	"The Day I Tried to Live" (1994)

Music video
- "Spoonman" on YouTube

"Spoonman" is a song by American rock band Soundgarden. Written by frontman Chris Cornell, it was released on February 7, 1994 by A&M Records, as the lead single from the band's fourth studio album, Superunknown (1994). The name was inspired by Seattle street performer Artis the Spoonman, who plays spoons on the song and also appears in the video.

"Spoonman" peaked at No. 3 on Billboard's Album Rock Tracks chart and No. 9 on Billboard's Modern Rock Tracks chart. The song was included on Soundgarden's 1997 greatest hits album, A-Sides, as well as on the 2010 compilation album, Telephantasm, while a remixed version by Steve Fisk appears on the "Black Hole Sun" and "My Wave" singles.

== Origin and recording ==
"Spoonman" was originally written for the soundtrack to the 1992 film Singles. At that time, Soundgarden, along with Pearl Jam, were working on the soundtrack for the film. Pearl Jam's bass guitarist, Jeff Ament, had been put in charge of creating the name for a fictional band that would appear in the film. Before finally choosing Citizen Dick for its name, Ament had compiled a list of potential names, which included the name "Spoonman". The name was inspired by Artis the Spoonman, a street performer from Santa Cruz, California, and later Seattle, Washington, who plays music with a set of spoons. Soundgarden's vocalist and songwriter, Chris Cornell, eventually used the names on the list to create songs for the film. "Spoonman" was among these, and an acoustic version was created from it. This early version of the song is played during a scene in the film in which a poster advertising a Citizen Dick show is stapled to a lightpost.

Rather than just leave the song on the film's soundtrack, Soundgarden began working on an electric version of "Spoonman". The song's inspiration, Artis the Spoonman, played a prominent role in the song. The final version of the song has Artis the Spoonman playing his spoons as part of the song's bridge. Drummer Matt Cameron also plays pots and pans on the song and bass guitarist, Ben Shepherd, performs backing vocals.

== Composition ==
"Spoonman" is a grunge, hard rock, and alternative rock song, performed in drop D tuning. The main riff was written in septuple meter, in 7/4 time. The chorus is 4/4 and part of the spoon solo is in 3/4. The guitarist, Kim Thayil, has said that Soundgarden usually did not consider the time signature of a song until after the band had written it and said that the use of odd meters was "a total accident".

== Lyrics ==
Due to the Pacific Northwest's notoriety for its drug culture amongst musicians at the time, particularly in the grunge scene, the song has been rumored to be about heroin use since its release, however Cornell always denied this.

In a 1994 interview Cornell said:

It's more about the paradox of who [Artis] is and what people perceive him as. He's a street musician, but when he's playing on the street, he is given a value and judged completely wrong by someone else. They think he's a street person, or he's doing this because he can't hold down a regular job. They put him a few pegs down on the social ladder because of how they perceive someone who dresses differently. The lyrics express the sentiment that I much more easily identify with someone like Artis than I would watch him play.

== Release and reception ==
The band played "Spoonman" while on its 1993 tour with Neil Young. With hype building around the band's upcoming album, Superunknown, Soundgarden released the single in 1994, a month before the album's release, with a previously unreleased B-side titled "Exit Stonehenge". On the choice of "Spoonman" as the album's first single, Shepherd called it a "great first choice", adding that "it just jumps out at you instantly". Shepherd said, "You know how you listen to a record and there is one song that literally seems to leap out of the speakers—well, 'Spoonman' did that to me." Shortly after the single's release, the song became widely popular, reaching high positions on rock charts. The song peaked at No. 3 on Billboard's Album Rock Tracks chart and No. 9 on Billboard's Modern Rock Tracks chart. At the 1995 Grammy Awards, "Spoonman" received the award for Best Metal Performance.

Outside the United States, the single was released commercially in Australia, Canada, Germany and the United Kingdom. In Canada, the song reached No. 12 on the Canadian singles chart, reached the UK Top 20, peaked at No. 23 on the Australian Singles Chart, reached the top 30 in Ireland and the top ten in New Zealand. In 2017, Billboard ranked the song No. 12 on its list of the 15 greatest Soundgarden songs, and, in 2021, Kerrang ranked the song No. 5 on its list of the 20 greatest Soundgarden songs.

== Music video ==
The music video for "Spoonman" was directed by Jeffrey Plansker (under the alias "John Smithey"). The video features Artis prominently, making him the focus of the video instead of the band, who are shown only in black-and-white still photographs. Cornell can be seen in some photographs wearing a fork necklace given to him by Shannon Hoon, which he also wore in the video for "Black Hole Sun".

In an interview with Hit Parader magazine in 1994, Chris Cornell said about the music video:

I think we were fairly smart with "Spoonman" in that you really don't see us that much in the video. You see various pictures of us, but it's not quite the same as having us in your living room all the time. We're trying to maintain some degree of mystique about Soundgarden, I guess. I remember back when I was a kid, long before MTV, and the only way to see my favorite bands was to go to their concerts. It was an incredible experience. MTV has helped a lot of bands, but they've also helped rob a lot of groups of that special mystique. It's tough when you can see a great rock band on TV one second, then hit the clicker and be watching a soap opera or a sitcom the next. That's what rock and roll has become for some people.

== Track listings ==
All songs were written by Chris Cornell, except where noted.

- CD (Europe) and 12-inch vinyl (Europe)
1. "Spoonman" – 4:06
2. "Fresh Tendrils" (Matt Cameron, Cornell) – 4:16
3. "Cold Bitch" – 5:01
4. "Exit Stonehenge" (Cameron, Cornell, Ben Shepherd, Kim Thayil) – 1:19
- Cassette (UK) and 7-inch vinyl (UK)
1. "Spoonman" – 4:06
2. "Fresh Tendrils" (Cameron, Cornell) – 4:16
- CD (Germany)
1. "Spoonman" (edit) – 3:51
2. "Cold Bitch" – 5:11
3. "Exit Stonehenge" (Cameron, Cornell, Shepherd, Thayil) – 1:19
- CD (Australia and Canada)
1. "Spoonman" – 4:06
2. "Cold Bitch" – 5:01

== Personnel ==
Personnel adapted from Superunknown liner notes

Soundgarden

- Chris Cornell – vocals, rhythm guitar
- Kim Thayil – lead guitar
- Ben Shepherd – bass, additional vocals
- Matt Cameron – drums, percussion, pots and pans

Additional musicians

- Artis the Spoonman – spoons

== Charts ==
=== Weekly charts ===
Chart (1994)	Peak position
Australia (ARIA)	23
Australia Alternative (ARIA)	1
Canada Top Singles (RPM)	12
European Hot 100 Singles (Music & Media)	47
Finland (Suomen virallinen lista)	8
Iceland (Dagblaðið Vísir Top 30)	3
Ireland (IRMA)	23
Israel (Israeli Singles Chart)	39
New Zealand (Recorded Music NZ)	10
Netherlands (Single Top 100)	37
Sweden (Sverigetopplistan)	37
UK Singles (Official Charts)	20
US Alternative Airplay (Billboard)	9
US Mainstream Rock (Billboard)	3

Chart (2017)	Peak position
US Hot Rock & Alternative Songs (Billboard)	18
US Rock Digital Song Sales (Billboard)	11

=== Year-end charts ===
Chart (1994)	Position
US Album Rock Tracks (Billboard)	13

== Certifications ==
Certifications for "Spoonman"
Region	Certification	Certified units/sales
New Zealand (RMNZ)	Gold	15,000^{‡}
^{‡} Sales+streaming figures based on certification alone.

== Release history ==
Release dates and formats for "Spoonman"
Region	Date	Format(s)	Label(s)	Ref.
Australia	February 7, 1994	CD; cassette	Polydor	
United Kingdom	February 14, 1994	7-inch vinyl; 12-inch vinyl; CD; cassette	A&M	
United States	February 21, 1994	Radio	A&M	
Japan	March 2, 1994	Mini-CD	A&M	
