= Songs from the Superunknown =

EP by Soundgarden
- Released: November 21, 1995
- Recorded: 1993–1994
- Genre: Grunge
- Length: 23:42
- Language: English
- Label: A&M
- Producers: Michael Beinhorn, Brendan O'Brien, Soundgarden

Soundgarden EPs chronology
Loudest Love (1990)	Songs from the Superunknown (1995)	Before the Doors: Live on I-5 Soundcheck

Alive in the Superunknown
- Artwork for the Alive in the Superunknown CD-ROM

Professional ratings
Review scores
Source	Rating
AllMusic	2.5/5 stars

Songs from the Superunknown is an EP by the American rock band Soundgarden. It was released on November 21, 1995, through A&M Records. It was released on the same day as the CD-ROM Alive in the Superunknown.

== Overview ==
The EP is the audio-only counterpart to Alive in the Superunknown. AllMusic staff writer Greg Prato gave the EP two and a half out of five stars. He called it a "solid (albeit short) collection of Soundgarden outtakes".

== Alive in the Superunknown ==
The CD-ROM Alive in the Superunknown contains the first four tracks from Songs from the Superunknown plus a multimedia portion featuring photos of the band, a video game, four music videos ("The Day I Tried to Live", "Black Hole Sun", "My Wave", and "Fell on Black Days"), a performance/special effects video of "Superunknown", and a live video of "Kickstand", among other things. Entertainment Weekly said, "Nothing on Alive ... equals the mystery, humor, sonic impact, or imagination contained on any one of the tracks on Soundgarden's Superunknown album."

== Track listing ==
All songs written by Chris Cornell, except where noted:

1. "Superunknown" (Cornell, Kim Thayil) – 5:06
  - Originally from Superunknown.
2. "Fell on Black Days" (video version) – 5:26
  - Originally from the "Fell on Black Days" single. An alternate version, it is the one used in the music video for the song.
3. "She Likes Surprises" – 3:17
  - Originally from international versions of Superunknown.
4. "Like Suicide" (acoustic) – 6:11
  - Originally from the single "The Day I Tried to Live". Performed acoustically by Chris Cornell.
5. "Jerry Garcia's Finger" (Matt Cameron, Cornell, Ben Shepherd, Thayil) – 4:00
  - Previously unreleased.

== Personnel ==
Soundgarden

- Matt Cameron – drums
- Chris Cornell – lead vocals, rhythm guitar
- Ben Shepherd – bass
- Kim Thayil – lead guitar

Production

- Michael Beinhorn, Brendan O'Brien, Soundgarden – production

Management

- Susan Silver Management – management
