= Superunknown =

Studio album by Soundgarden
- Released: March 8, 1994
- Recorded: July–September 1993
- Studios: Bad Animals (Seattle, Washington)
- Genres: Grunge; alternative metal; doom metal; hard rock; stoner rock; psychedelic rock
- Length: 70:13
- Label: A&M
- Producers: Michael Beinhorn; Soundgarden

Soundgarden chronology
Badmotorfinger (1991)	Superunknown (1994)	Down on the Upside (1996)

Singles from Superunknown
- 1. "Spoonman" Released: February 7, 1994; 2. "The Day I Tried to Live" Released: April 18, 1994 (UK); 3. "Black Hole Sun" Released: May 23, 1994; 4. "My Wave" Released: September 1994; 5. "Fell on Black Days" Released: 1994

2014 re-release cover

Superunknown is the fourth studio album by American rock band Soundgarden, released on March 8, 1994, through A&M Records. Produced by Michael Beinhorn and the band themselves, Soundgarden began work on the album after touring in support of their previous album, Badmotorfinger (1991). Superunknown retained the heaviness of the band's earlier releases while displaying a more diverse range of influences.

Superunknown was a critical and commercial success and became the band's breakthrough album. It debuted at number one on the Billboard 200, selling 310,000 copies in its opening week. The album also topped the Australian, Canadian, and New Zealand charts. Five singles were released from the album: "The Day I Tried to Live", "My Wave", "Fell on Black Days", "Spoonman", and "Black Hole Sun", the latter two of which won Grammy Awards and helped Soundgarden reach mainstream popularity. At the 37th Grammy Awards, the album was nominated for the Grammy Award for Best Rock Album. It has been certified 6× Platinum by the Recording Industry Association of America (RIAA) in the United States. Superunknown has been listed by several publications as one of the best albums of the 1990s and a quintessential grunge album. In April 2019, it was ranked No. 9 on Rolling Stone's "50 Greatest Grunge Albums" list.

== Recording ==
Soundgarden began work on its next album about two months after finishing its stint on the 1992 Lollapalooza tour. The individual band members wrote material on their own before bringing in demos to which the other members would contribute. Frontman Chris Cornell noted that the band allowed each other more artistic freedom than on previous records. Guitarist Kim Thayil observed that even though the band spent as much time writing and arranging as it had on previous albums, it spent a lot more time working on recording the songs. After two albums with producer Terry Date, the band decided to seek another collaborator. Thayil said, "We just thought we'd go for a change." Eventually they settled on producer Michael Beinhorn, who "didn't have his own trademark sound which he was trying to tack on to Soundgarden" and had ideas the band approved.

The album's recording sessions took place from July 1993 to September 1993 at Bad Animals Studio in Seattle, Washington, as according to Cornell "there was never a decent studio in Seattle and now there's one with a Neve console, so it seemed obvious to use it". Bad Animals' resident engineer Adam Kasper, who went on to produce Soundgarden's following albums, assisted Beinhorn on the recording process. Soundgarden took the approach of recording one song at a time. The drum and bass parts were recorded first for each song, and then Cornell and Thayil would lay down their parts over top. Cornell said that getting to know Beinhorn contributed to the length of time Soundgarden spent working on the album. The band spent time experimenting with different drum and guitar sounds, and utilized production techniques such as layering to achieve an expansive production sound. Cornell noted, "Michael Beinhorn was so into sounds. He was so, almost, anal about it, that it took the piss out of us a lot of the time... By the time you get the sounds that you want to record the song, you're sick and tired of playing it." Beinhorn tried to add many of his preferred musicians to mold the band's sound, in what Billboard described as "weaning the band from brute force, giving it the impetus to invest in a more subtle power." For instance, prior to tracking the vocals for "Black Hole Sun", Beinhorn had Cornell listen to Frank Sinatra.

Superunknown features 15 songs and a runtime of approximately 70 minutes because, according to Cornell, the band members "didn't really want to argue over what should be cut." Soundgarden paused the recording sessions to open for Neil Young on a ten-day United States tour. Afterward, the band hired Brendan O'Brien to mix the album because Beinhorn felt they needed "a fresh pair of ears"; O'Brien was recommended by Pearl Jam guitarist Stone Gossard. Thayil called the mixing process "very painless", and bassist Ben Shepherd remembered it as "the fastest part of the record."

Behind-the-scenes footage of the band tracking and mixing "Kickstand" was featured in the "Sound" episode of Bill Nye the Science Guy.

== Outtakes ==
Although the album's singles featured quite a few B-sides, only "Exit Stonehenge" (from the "Spoonman" single) was sourced from the Superunknown recording sessions in 1993. "Cold Bitch" (also from "Spoonman") was recorded during the Badmotorfinger recording sessions in 1991, "Kyle Petty, Son of Richard" and "Motorcycle Loop" (both from the "Fell on Black Days" single) were recorded by Stuart Hallerman at Avast Studios in Seattle in 1994. "Kyle Petty, Son of Richard" was later featured on the 1996 Home Alive compilation. "Tighter & Tighter", "No Attention", and "An Unkind", all of which later appeared on the band's 1996 album, Down on the Upside, were attempted during the Superunknown recording sessions. Cameron said that the band wasn't pleased with the recording of "No Attention" that came out of the sessions. An instrumental entitled "Ruff Riff-Raff" and a light-hearted song called "Bing Bing Goes to Church" were recorded at album rehearsals but were presumably not recorded during the Superunknown recording sessions. Both were released in 2014 on the 20th anniversary Super Deluxe edition.

== Composition ==
The songs on Superunknown retain the grunge and alternative metal sound of the band's previous works, while embracing alternative rock, hard rock, heavy metal, and psychedelic rock. Steve Huey of AllMusic said the band's "earlier punk influences are rarely detectable, replaced by surprisingly effective appropriations of pop and psychedelia." Cornell labeled the album as more "challenging" and "versatile" than the band's previous releases. The songs on the album are more experimental and diverse than the band's previous recordings, with some songs having a Middle-Eastern or Indian flavor (for example "Half", sung by Shepherd). Some songs also show a Beatles influence, such as "Head Down" and "Black Hole Sun". In a 1994 interview with Guitar World, Thayil explained, "We looked deep down inside the very core of our souls and there was a little Ringo sitting there. Oh sure, we like telling people it's John Lennon or George Harrison; but when you really look deep inside of Soundgarden, there's a little Ringo wanting to get out." Drummer Matt Cameron said that the experimentation on the album was "just a matter of refinement." According to The A.V. Club, the album "both redefined and transcended grunge". Michael Beinhorn stated that to achieve the intensity of Superunknown, he sought influence from European electronic music, such as the British Aphex Twin and the Dutch genre of Gabber, described by him as "some of the rawest music made".

Soundgarden used alternate tunings - and tuned their guitars a quarter step down - and odd time signatures across several tracks. "Spoonman", "Black Hole Sun", "Let Me Drown", and "Kickstand" are performed in drop D tuning, whereas "Fell on Black Days" uses standard tuning. Other songs employ more unorthodox tunings: "Superunknown" and "Fresh Tendrils" are tuned to DGDGBe, and "Like Suicide" utilizes a similar DGDGBC arrangement. "My Wave" and "The Day I Tried to Live" both use EEBBBe; "Mailman" and "Limo Wreck" employ CGDGBe; "Head Down" and "Half" utilize CGCGGe; and "4th of July" features CFCGBe tuning. The band's use of odd meters was equally varied: "Fell on Black Days" is written in 6/4, "Limo Wreck" is in 15/8, "My Wave" alternates between 5/4 and 4/4, "The Day I Tried to Live" alternates between 7/8 and 4/4, and "Spoonman" alternates between 7/4 and 4/4 sections. Thayil noted that Soundgarden rarely considered a song's time signature until after it was completely written, calling the use of odd meters "a total accident."

Lyrically, the album is dark and mysterious, exploring themes of substance abuse, suicide, and depression, alongside running motifs of revenge, annihilation, seclusion, fear, loss, death, and discovery. Cornell was heavily inspired by the writings of Sylvia Plath during the writing sessions. Commenting on the album's lyrics, Thayil said that "a lot of Superunknown seems to me to be about life, not death. Maybe not affirming it, but rejoicing—like the Druids [put it]: 'Life is good, but death's gonna be even better!" Cameron said that the lyrics on the album are "a big fuck-you to the world, a plea to 'leave us alone'". Cornell stated that "Let Me Drown" is about "crawling back to the womb to die", "Fell on Black Days" is about realizing "you're unhappy in the extreme", "Black Hole Sun" is about a "surreal dreamscape", "Limo Wreck" is a "shame-on-decadence song", "The Day I Tried to Live" is about "trying to step out of being patterned and closed off and reclusive", and "4th of July" is about using LSD. Cornell talked about "Mailman" at a concert saying, "This next one is about killing your boss. It's about coming to work early one morning cause you have a special agenda and you're going to shoot him in the fucking head." Conversely, "Like Suicide" was literal, written by Cornell after a bird flew into a window of his house. He found the severely injured animal and killed it, hitting it with a brick to end its suffering.

The video clip of the song "Spoonman" is notable for featuring a performance by Artis the Spoonman, a street entertainer in Seattle. The title of the song is credited to bassist Jeff Ament of Pearl Jam. While on the set of the movie Singles, Ament produced a list of song titles for the fictional band featured in the movie. Cornell took it as a challenge to write songs for the film using those titles, and "Spoonman" was one of them. An acoustic demo version of the song appears in the movie. Cornell said that the song is about "the paradox of who [Artis] is and what people perceive him as".

== Packaging ==
The album's cover art (known as the 'Screaming Elf') is a distorted photograph of the band members, photographed by Kevin Westenberg, above a black and white upside-down burning forest. Concerning the artwork, Cornell said, "Superunknown relates to birth in a way ... Being born or even dying—getting flushed into something that you know nothing about. The hardest thing is to nail down a visual image to put on a title like that. The first thing we thought of was a forest in grey or black. Soundgarden has always been associated with images of flowers and lush colors and this was the opposite. It still seemed organic but it was very dark and cold ... I was into those stories as a kid where forests were full of evil and scary things as opposed to being happy gardens that you go camping in." In a 1994 Pulse! magazine interview, Cornell said that the inspiration for the album's title came from his misreading of a video entitled Superclown. He added, "I thought it was a cool title. I'd never heard it before, never saw it before, and it inspired me." The album also saw a limited release on 12" colored vinyl (blue, orange, and clear), as a double-LP in a gatefold sleeve.

On May 25, 2017, photographer Kevin Westenberg revealed the full photo from the cover for the first time on his Instagram account.

== Critical reception ==
Professional ratings
Initial reviews
Review scores
Source	Rating
The Atlanta Journal	3.5/4 stars
Daily News	3/5 stars
Entertainment Weekly	A
Houston Chronicle	3.5/5 stars
Los Angeles Times	3.5/4 stars
Q	5/5 stars
Rolling Stone	4.5/5 stars 4/5 stars
San Francisco Chronicle	3/5 stars
Select	3/5 medals
St. Petersburg Times	4/5 stars

Professional ratings
Retrospective reviews
Review scores
Source	Rating
AllMusic	5/5 stars
Blender	5/5 stars
Christgau's Consumer Guide	A−
The Encyclopedia of Popular Music	5/5 stars
MusicHound Rock	5/5 stars
Pitchfork	8.5/10
The Rolling Stone Album Guide	5/5 stars
Spin	5/5 stars
Spin Alternative Record Guide	8/10
Sputnikmusic	5/5

Superunknown received universal acclaim from music critics. Q said, "Soundgarden dealt in unreconstructed heavy rock: a heavy guitar sound, depth-charge drumming ... Yet Superunknown also includes more measured moments". Rolling Stone magazine's J. D. Considine was impressed by the record's range and, despite criticizing "Black Hole Sun" and "Half", he said "at its best, Superunknown offers a more harrowing depiction of alienation and despair than anything on In Utero". Jon Pareles of The New York Times credited the band with trying to transcend conventional heavy metal: "Superunknown actually tries to broaden its audience by breaking heavy-metal genre barriers that Soundgarden used to accept." In Entertainment Weekly, David Browne wrote, "Soundgarden is pumped and primed on Superunknown, and they deliver the goods." He praised it as a "hard-rock milestone – a boiling vat of volcanic power, record-making smarts, and '90s anomie and anxiety that sets a new standard for anything called metal." Ann Powers from Blender said that "guitarist Thayil helps create the stoner-rock template", and that it "stands as Soundgarden's masterpiece". Village Voice critic Robert Christgau, who had "mocked" Soundgarden's "conceptual pretentions for years", still felt their foredooming, pessimistic lyrics lacked much substance, but said they had improved composing, arranging, and producing on an album that was "easily the best—most galvanizing, kinetic, sensational, catchy—Zep rip in history". In a retrospective review, AllMusic editor Steve Huey wrote, "It's obvious that Superunknown was consciously styled as a masterwork, and it fulfills every ambition." It received a nomination in the Best Rock Album category for the 1995 Grammy Awards.

"We were listening to Nirvana and Pearl Jam just like everybody else," remarked Def Leppard's Vivian Campbell, "and especially to Soundgarden – the Superunknown record. That was the record that we referenced in terms of the sonics and the mood of it when making Slang."

=== Accolades ===
The critical acclaim garnered by Superunknown has led to its inclusion in many lists of the greatest albums.

Accolades for Superunknown
Publication	Country	Accolade	Year	Rank
The Village Voice	United States	Pazz & Jop: Greatest Albums of 1994	1994	11
Entertainment Weekly	United States	The Best and Worst 1994/Music	1994	3 (Best)
Spin	United States	"Top 20 Albums of 1994"	1994	17
Spin	United States	"Top 90 Albums of the 90s"	1999	70
Spin	United States	"125 Best Albums of the last 25 Years"	2012	90
Rolling Stone	United States	"Best Albums of 1994"	1995	3
Rolling Stone	United States	"The 500 Greatest Albums of All Time"	2012	335
Rolling Stone	United States	"The 100 Greatest Albums of the 90s"	2011	38
Muziekkrant OOR	Netherlands	"The 100 Best Albums of 1991–1995"	1995	49
Alternative Press	United States	"The 90 Greatest Albums of the 90s"	1998	18
Kerrang!	United Kingdom	"100 Albums You Must Hear Before You Die"	1998	70
Pause & Play	United States	"The 90s Top 100 Essential Albums"	1999	11
Rock Hard	Germany	"The 500 Greatest Rock & Metal Albums of All Time"	2005	304
Loudwire	United States	"10 Best Hard Rock Albums of 1994"	2014	3
Wall of Sound	United States	"Top 100 Albums of All Time"	1999	89

Unranked list inclusions for Superunknown
Publication	Country	List	Year	Ref
Guitar World	United States	50 Iconic Albums That Defined 1994	2014	
1001 Albums You Must Hear Before You Die	Global	1001 Albums You Must Hear Before You Die	2005	

== Commercial performance ==
Superunknown was Soundgarden's breakthrough album, earning the band international recognition. Upon its release in March 1994, Superunknown debuted at number one on the Billboard 200 album chart and eventually closed the year as the 13th best-selling album of 1994, with 2.5 million copies sold. The album has been certified six times platinum by the RIAA in the United States, three times platinum in Canada and Australia, and two times platinum in Sweden, platinum in the United Kingdom, and gold in the Netherlands and Italy.

The album spawned the EP Songs from the Superunknown and the CD-ROM Alive in the Superunknown, both released in 1995.

== 20th anniversary reissues ==
The 20th anniversary reissue of "Superunknown" was made available in two deluxe versions. The Deluxe Edition was a 2-CD package featuring the remastered album along with disc two consisting of demos, rehearsals, B-sides and more. The Super Deluxe Edition was a 5-CD package featuring the remastered album, additional demos, rehearsals and B-sides and the fifth disc is the album mixed in Blu-ray Audio 5.1 Surround Sound. The Super Deluxe Edition was packaged in a hardbound book with a lenticular cover, liner notes by David Fricke and newly reimagined album artwork designed by Josh Graham. It also featured never-before-seen band photography by Kevin Westerberg. A 2-LP gatefold of the original 16 vinyl tracks remastered on 200-gram vinyl in a gatefold jacket was also made available. In addition, the Superunknown singles and associated b-sides with newly interpreted artwork sleeves by Josh Graham was reissued on Record Store Day, April 19, 2014, as a set of five limited-edition 10-inch vinyl records."

== Tour ==
The band began touring in support of the album in January 1994 with dates in Oceania and Japan, regions where the record had received an early release. It marked Soundgarden's first time touring those areas. This initial leg concluded in February 1994, and the band moved on to Europe the following month. Soundgarden was originally scheduled to join Nine Inch Nails for a 20-date co-headlining tour of the United States throughout April and May, but the group was forced to cancel. Instead, they launched an American headlining theater tour on May 27, 1994, supported by opening acts Tad and Eleven.

In late 1994, doctors discovered that frontman Chris Cornell had severely strained his vocal cords due to the rigorous touring schedule. To prevent permanent damage, Soundgarden cancelled several upcoming performances. Cornell noted, "I think we kinda overdid it! We were playing five or six nights a week and my voice pretty much took a beating. Towards the end of the American tour I felt like I could still kinda sing, but I wasn't really giving the band a fair shake. You don't buy a ticket to see some guy croak for two hours! That seemed like kind of a rip off." The band subsequently made up the cancelled dates in 1995.

== Track listing ==
All lyrics are written by Chris Cornell, except where noted.

Superunknown
No.	Title	Lyrics	Music	Length
1.	"Let Me Drown"		Cornell	3:51
2.	"My Wave"		Cornell; Kim Thayil	5:12
3.	"Fell on Black Days"		Cornell	4:42
4.	"Mailman"		Matt Cameron	4:25
5.	"Superunknown"		Thayil; Cornell	5:06
6.	"Head Down"	Ben Shepherd	Shepherd	6:08
7.	"Black Hole Sun"		Cornell	5:18
8.	"Spoonman"		Cornell	4:06
9.	"Limo Wreck"		Cameron; Thayil	5:47
10.	"The Day I Tried to Live"		Cornell	5:19
11.	"Kickstand"		Thayil	1:34
12.	"Fresh Tendrils"	Cornell, Cameron	Cameron	4:16
13.	"4th of July"		Cornell	5:08
14.	"Half"	Shepherd	Shepherd	2:14
15.	"Like Suicide"		Cornell	7:01
Total length:				70:13

Bonus track (LP and international CD)
No.	Title	Music	Length
16.	"She Likes Surprises"	Cornell	3:20
Total length:			73:33

== Personnel ==
=== Soundgarden ===
- Chris Cornell – vocals, rhythm guitar
- Kim Thayil – lead guitar
- Ben Shepherd – bass; additional drums and percussion ("Head Down"); additional vocals ("Spoonman"); lead vocals and guitar ("Half")
- Matt Cameron – drums, percussion; Mellotron ("Mailman"); pots and pans ("Spoonman")

=== Additional musicians ===
- April Acevez – viola ("Half")
- Artis the Spoonman – spoons ("Spoonman")
- Michael Beinhorn – piano ("Let Me Drown")
- Fred Chalenor – harmonic guidance ("Limo Wreck")
- Justine Foy – cello ("Half")
- Gregg Keplinger – additional drums and percussion ("Head Down")
- Natasha Shneider – clavinet ("Fresh Tendrils")

=== Production ===
- Michael Beinhorn - producer, mixing ("4th of July")
- David Collins – mastering
- Jason Corsaro – engineering
- Adam Kasper – assistant engineering
- Kelk – front cover design
- Gregg Keplinger – studio assistance
- Tony Messina – studio assistance
- Brendan O'Brien – mixing (except "4th of July")
- Reyzart – layout
- Soundgarden – production
- Kevin Westenberg – band photography

== Charts ==
=== Weekly charts ===
Initial chart performance for Superunknown
Chart (1994)	Peak position
Australian Albums (ARIA)	1
Australia Alternative Albums (ARIA)	1
Austrian Albums (Ö3 Austria)	19
Canadian Albums (The Record)	1
Danish Albums (Hitlisten)	7
Finnish Albums (Suomen virallinen lista)	7
Dutch Albums (Album Top 100)	11
European Albums (European Top 100 Albums)	8
French Albums (SNEP)	44
German Albums (Offizielle Top 100)	13
Hungarian Albums (Mahasz)	30
New Zealand Albums (RMNZ)	1
Norwegian Albums (VG-lista)	5
Scottish Albums (Official Charts)	4
Swedish Albums (Sverigetopplistan)	3
Swiss Albums (Schweizer Hitparade)	9
UK Albums (Official Charts)	4
US Billboard 200	1
US Cashbox Album Charts	1

Weekly chart performance for 20th anniversary reissue
Chart (2014–2015)	Peak position
Belgian Albums (Ultratop Wallonia)	138
Italian Albums (FIMI)	87
Spanish Albums (Promusicae)	85
US Tastemaker Albums (Billboard)	12
US Vinyl Albums (Billboard)	9

Weekly chart performance for Superunknown upon Chris Cornell's death
Chart (2017)	Peak position
Canadian Albums (Billboard)	22
Irish Albums (IRMA)	38
Portuguese Albums (AFP)	43
US Digital Albums (Billboard)	9
US Hard Rock Albums (Billboard)	2
US Top Catalog Albums (Billboard)	1
US Top Rock Albums (Billboard)	5

=== Year-end charts ===
1994 year-end chart performance for Superunknown
Chart (1994)	Position
Australian Albums (ARIA)	20
Canada Top Albums/CDs (RPM)	5
Dutch Albums (Album Top 100)	62
European Albums (European Top 100 Albums)	28
German Albums (Offizielle Top 100)	24
Icelandic Albums (Tónlist)	9
New Zealand Albums (Recorded Music NZ)	25
Swedish Albums (Sverigetopplistan)	32
UK Albums (OCC)	71
US Billboard 200	19

1995 year-end chart performance for Superunknown
Chart (1995)	Position
US Billboard 200	88

== Certifications ==
Certifications and sales for Superunknown
Region	Certification	Certified units/sales
Australia (ARIA)	3× Platinum	210,000^{^}
Canada (Music Canada)	3× Platinum	300,000^{^}
Italy (FIMI)	Gold	25,000^{‡}
Netherlands (NVPI)	Gold	50,000^{^}
New Zealand (RMNZ)	Platinum	15,000^{‡}
Sweden (GLF)	2× Platinum	200,000^{^}
United Kingdom (BPI)	Platinum	300,000^{^}
United States (RIAA)	6× Platinum	6,000,000^{‡}
^{^} Shipments figures based on certification alone.^{‡} Sales+streaming figures based on certification alone.
