= This Man Is Mine =

This Man Is Mine may refer to:

- This Man Is Mine (1934 film), an American film directed by John Cromwell
- This Man Is Mine (1946 film), a British film directed by Marcel Varnel
- "This Man Is Mine" (song), a 1982 song by the Heart
