= My Wave =

1994 single by Soundgarden

Single by Soundgarden

from the album Superunknown
- B-side: "Spoonman" (remix); "Birth Ritual" (demo); "My Wave" (live)
- Released: September 1994
- Studio: Bad Animals (Seattle, Washington)
- Genre: Grunge; alternative metal
- Length: 5:12
- Label: A&M
- Composers: Chris Cornell; Kim Thayil
- Lyricist: Chris Cornell
- Producers: Michael Beinhorn; Soundgarden

Soundgarden singles chronology
"Black Hole Sun" (1994)	"My Wave" (1994)	"Fell on Black Days" (1994)

Music video
- "My Wave" on YouTube

"My Wave" is a song by American rock band Soundgarden, notable for an unorthodox tuning of E-E-B-B-B-B, and being predominantly in 5/4, an irregular time signature for rock music. Featuring lyrics written by frontman Chris Cornell and music co-written by Cornell and guitarist Kim Thayil, the song was serviced to US radio in September 1994 as the fourth single from the band's fourth studio album, Superunknown (1994). The single was only released commercially in Australia.

"My Wave" peaked at No. 11 on the Billboard Mainstream Rock Tracks chart, No. 18 on the Billboard Modern Rock Tracks chart and No. 66 on the Canadian RPM 100 Hit Tracks chart. A music video was also released in October 1994, but was not put into MTV's rotation.

== Background ==
Frontman Chris Cornell, when interviewed on The Tonight Show Starring Jimmy Fallon in celebration of Superunknown's 20th anniversary, stated that "My Wave" came together as a spontaneous rehearsal jam and was one of the last songs written for the album. "It was the end of a rehearsal," he says. "We were about to leave, and it’s almost like we were about to grab our car keys, and I just started playing the riff. Everybody just started immediately playing. . . the song."

== Composition ==
The song features lyrics written by Chris Cornell and music co-written by Cornell and guitarist Kim Thayil. "My Wave" is an alternative metal song, according to the music sheet published at DrumSetSheetMusic.com by Realsongbook. The song Corbin Reiff of Vulture described the song as "the closest grunge rock ever came to producing a classic surf song." The song has also been described as psychedelia, with Keith Mulopo of The Indiependent praising its use of cymbals, wah-wah guitar and vocal harmonies.

The tuning, as with many Soundgarden songs, is unorthodox—E-E-B-B-B-B, while the tempo is upbeat with 127 beats per minute. The song is in the keys of E minor and B mixolydian, and features the use of a bass wah pedal by Ben Shepherd. Predominantly in 5/4, an irregular time signature for rock music, the song changes, intersperses and juxtaposes time signatures freely. The effect created is both authoritatively erratic and characteristic of the band, even classically so. Guitarist Kim Thayil has said that Soundgarden usually did not consider the time signature of a song until after the band had written it, and said that the use of odd meters was "a total accident."

== Release and reception ==
"My Wave" peaked at number 11 on the Billboard Mainstream Rock Tracks chart and number 18 on the Billboard Modern Rock Tracks chart. Outside the United States, the single was released commercially in Australia. In Canada, the song reached the top 70 on the Canadian Singles Chart.

Jon Pareles of The New York Times said, "Amid its warring left- and right-channel guitars, "My Wave" includes a drum break harking back to Abbey Road." In The Village Voice, Robert Christgau said while Soundgarden had emulated Led Zeppelin in their music, "Zep never reached out like Cornell in 'My Wave'", citing the lyric, "Cry, if you want to cry/If it helps you see/If it clears your eyes/Hate, if you want to hate/If it keeps you safe/If it makes you brave."

"My Wave" appeared in the trailer for the 1994 film, The Endless Summer II. The song is featured on the soundtrack for the 2004 film, Riding Giants. It later appeared in a 2007 advertisement for the sixth season of the popular television series, 24.

== Music video ==
The music video for "My Wave" was co-directed by Henry Shepherd (bassist Ben Shepherd's brother), who would later direct the international version of the music video for "Pretty Noose", and Doug Pray. The video largely consists of performance footage of the band filmed in Calgary, Alberta on August 11, 1994, at Max Bell Arena. It also features scenes of a child riding his bicycle around a city. The blue man is a friend of the band called Matt "the Tube" Crowley from the Jim Rose Circus Sideshow. The video was released in October 1994. MTV decided not to put the video into its rotation. It is available on the CD-ROM Alive in the Superunknown.

== Track listing ==
All songs written by Chris Cornell and Kim Thayil, except where noted.

CD (Australia)

1. "My Wave" – 5:12
2. "Spoonman" (Steve Fisk remix) (Cornell) – 6:55
3. "Birth Ritual" (demo) (Cornell, Matt Cameron, Thayil) – 5:50
4. "My Wave" (live) – 4:34
  - Recorded live on August 20, 1993 at Jones Beach Amphitheater in Wantagh, New York.

== Charts ==
Weekly chart performance for "My Wave"
Chart (1994–1995)	Peak position
Australia (ARIA)	50
Canada Top Singles (RPM)	66
New Zealand (Recorded Music NZ)	46
US Alternative Airplay (Billboard)	18
US Mainstream Rock Airplay (Billboard)	11

== Release history ==
Release dates and formats for "My Wave"
Region	Date	Format(s)	Label(s)	Ref.
United States	September 1994	Radio	A&M	
Australia	October 31, 1994	CD; cassette	Polydor	
