= Jim Page (singer) =

American singer-songwriter (born 1949)

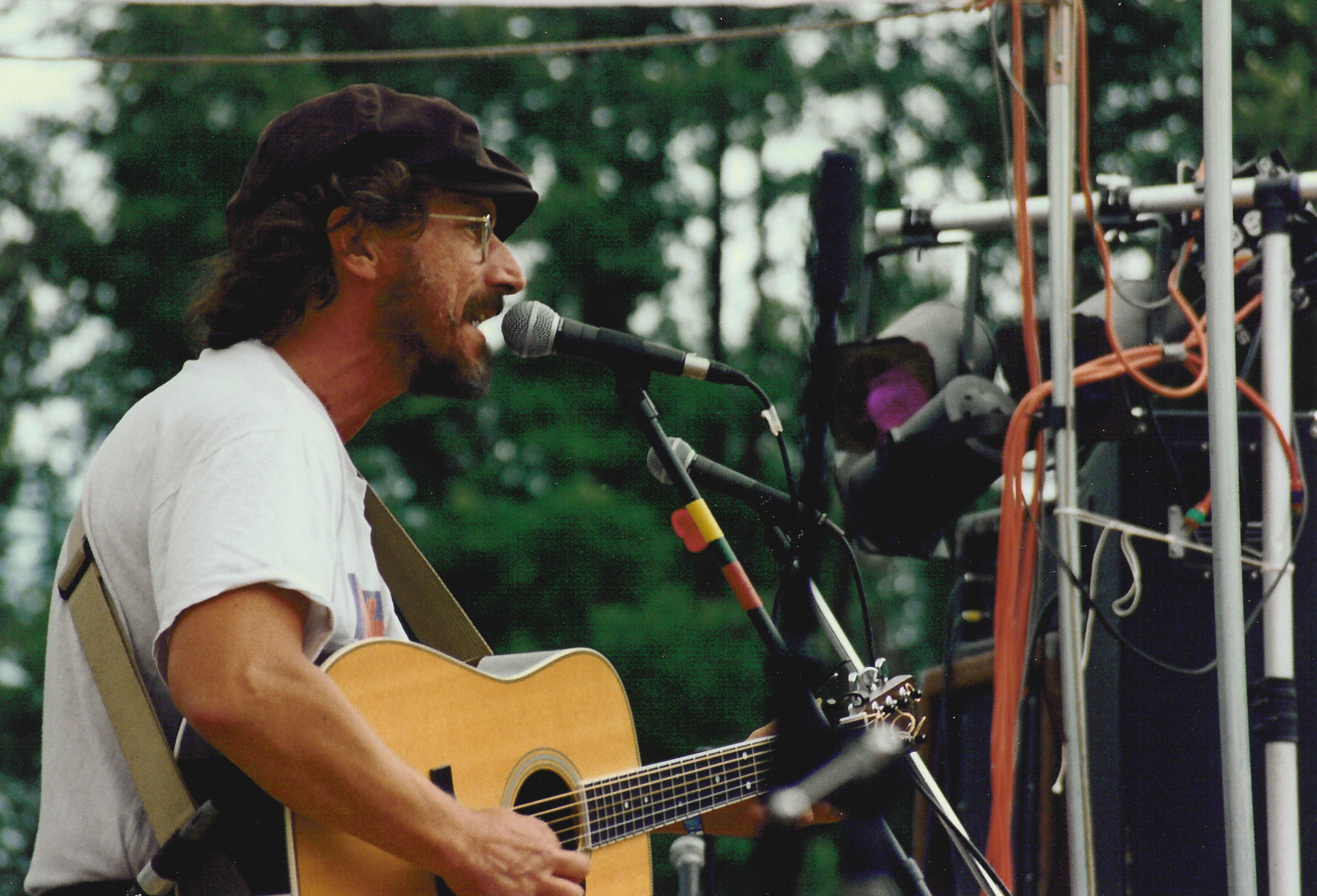
- Page in 1994

Background information
- Born: 1949 (age 75–76); Palo Alto, California, US
- Genres: Folk
- Occupations: Singer-songwriter; activist
- Instruments: Guitar; vocals
- Years active: 1965–present
- Website: jimpage.net

Jim Page (born 1949) is an American folk singer-songwriter and social activist. He is also a staunch supporter of Palestinian justice. His song entitled ‘Palestine’ has been sung by Irish singer Christy Moore.

== Early life ==
Page was born in Palo Alto, California, in 1949 - and moved to Seattle in 1971

== Music career and activism ==
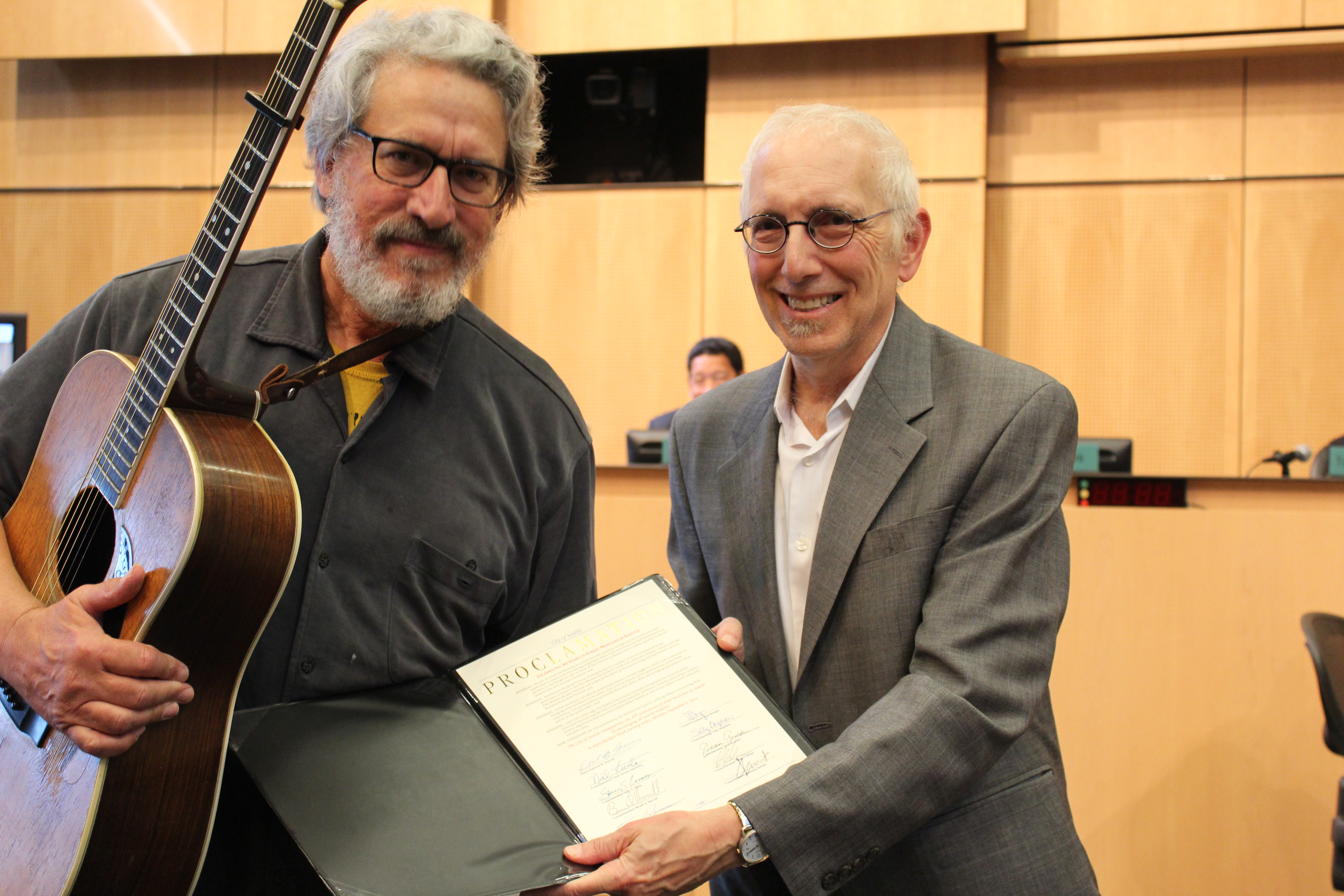
Seattle City Council member Nick Licata presents Page with a formal proclamation honoring the 40th anniversary of the Council's legalization of street music, in which Page played a key role.

He is known for his political songs and for his activism in support of buskers. He is one of the organizers of Buskerfest in Seattle. He frequently appears with Artis the Spoonman. He tours internationally, yet he still plays at Pike Place Market as a street performer.

Page began playing guitar at age 15.

In 1974, his protest song and testimony convinced the Seattle City Council to drop the requirement that street performers have a permit to perform.

== Notable work ==
Page is well known in coffee houses and folk clubs in Seattle and the northwest, as well as in Britain and Ireland, where he toured for several years. His best known songs include "Fireside", his first song, written in 1967, "Hiroshima Nagasaki Russian Roulette", an anti-nuclear weapons song from his 1976 album "On the Street Again", later covered by Moving Hearts and Christy Moore, "On the Street Again", "Time Enough for Questions When the Killing's Done", about the eternal quest for a 'man of honor', "Cultus Bay Serenade", "Miles and Miles", about the modernization of the San Francisco Bay Area, "Anna Mae", "An Old Pair of Red Shoes", and "Gasworks Park". He has also opposed US involvement in the Iraq war

Page's song "Landlord", which he recorded for his debut album, A Shot of the Usual, was covered by David Soul on his eponymous debut album.

== Discography ==
- A Shot of the Usual – Whid-Isle Records, LP, 1975
- On the Street Again – Whid-Isle Records, LP, 1976
- Hot Times – Whid-Isle Records, LP, 1979
- Song For Leonard Peltier – Nacksving, single, 1979
- In the Act – First American Records, LP, 1980
- This Movie Is For Real – Nacksving, LP, 1982
- Visions in My View – Flying Fish, LP, 1986
- More Than Anything Else in the World, 1993
- Jim Page & Artis: On The ~~Street~~ Sidewalk Again, cassette, 1994
- Whose World Is This, 1997
- Heroes and Survivors, 1997
- Gettin Squeezed, 1999
- Music From Big Red, 2001
- Collateral Damage, 2002
- Human Interesting – A Temporary Retrospective, 2002
- Seattle Songs, 2004
- Head Full of Pictures, 2006
- Jim Page & Artis: After All This Time, 2007
- I See What You Mean – Jim Page in Nashville, 2007
- Ghost Bikes, 2010
- A Hand Full Of Songs, 2017
- Pretty Simple, 2020
- The Time is Now, 2022
