= Spoons (musical instrument) =

Percussion instrument

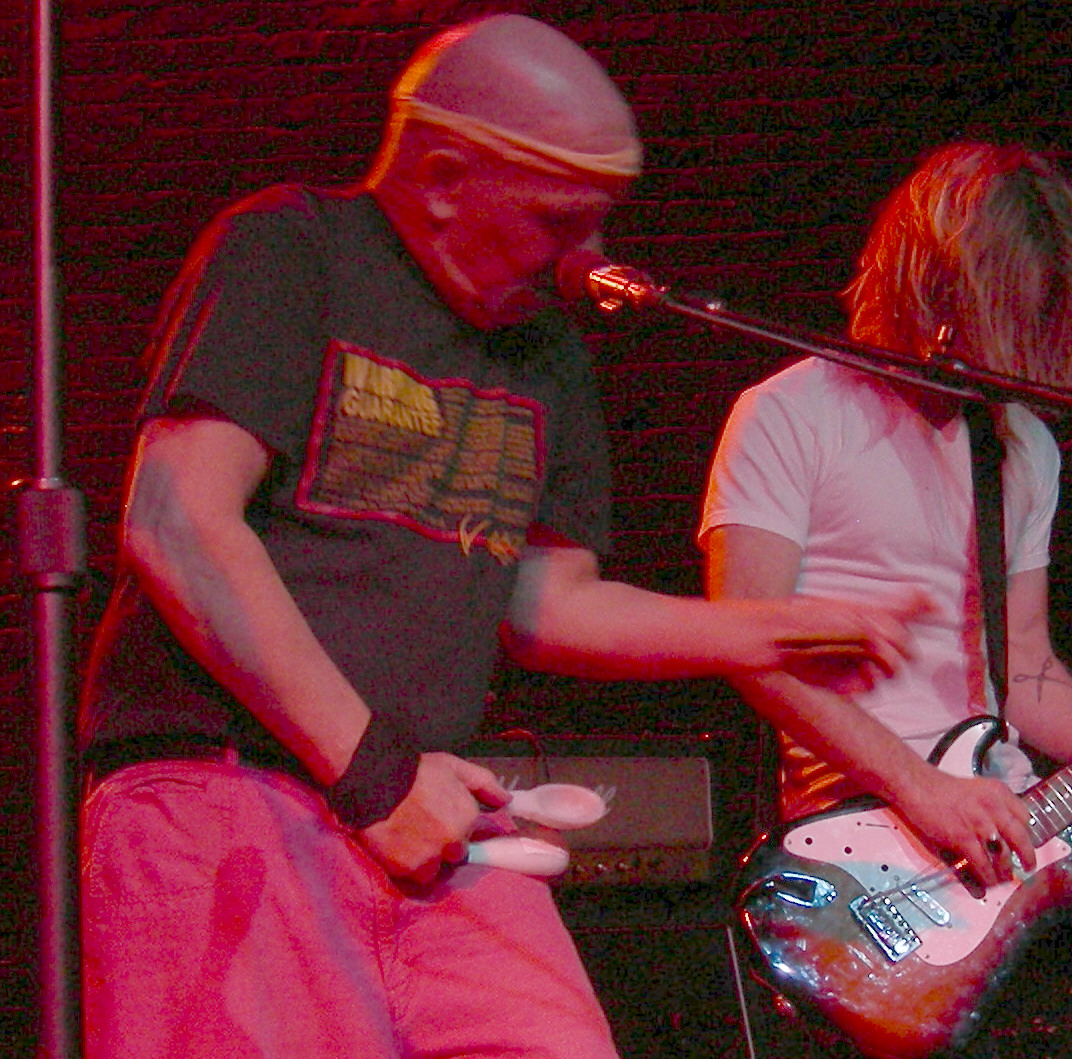
Artis the Spoonman playing the spoons in 2007.

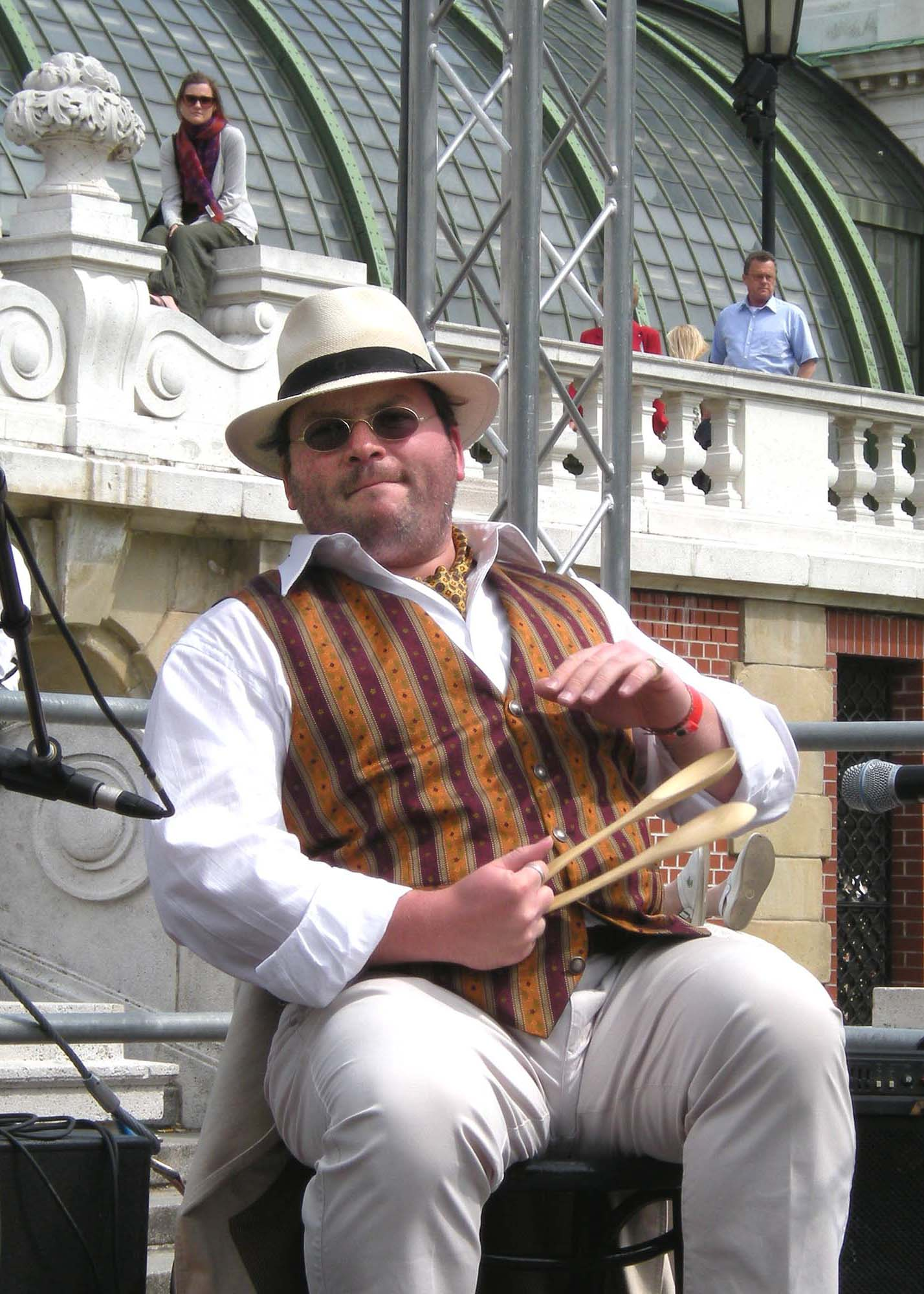
Klaus P. Steurer in '16er Buam' performance at Vienna's annual Stadtfest, 2009, in 'Burggarten'.

Spoons can be played as a makeshift percussion instrument, or more specifically, an idiophone related to the castanets. They are played by hitting one spoon against the other.

== Techniques ==
1. Fire tongs style: A pair of spoons is held tight with concave sides facing out and with index finger between their handles to space them apart. When the pair is struck, the spoons sharply hit each other and then spring back to their original position. The spoons are typically struck against the knee and the palm of the hand. The fingers and other body parts may also be used as striking surfaces to produce different sounds, rhythms, rattles and visual effects.
2. Salad serving style: One spoon between little, ring, and long finger; the other spoon between ring, thumb, and index finger in such a way that they can be rotated with ring finger as the common axis. They can be hit to each other at the convex sides by gathering the fingers (mostly middle and thumb).
3. Castanets style: Two in each hand one spoon held concave-side against the palm held down by the thumb, one between ring and middle fingers with finger tips in the concave side balancing the handle. They can be hit to each other at the convex sides by gripping with the middle and ring fingers.
4. Drumstick style: One spoon held concave-side against the palm, and handle jammed tight under the wrist watch belt, another in between ring and middle fingers of the left hand hitting the latter castanet style, and a third spoon in the right hand hitting both spoons in the left hand.

== American folk music ==
In the United States, spoons as instrument are associated with American folk music, minstrelsy, jug bands, and spasm bands. These musical genres make use of other everyday objects as instruments, such as the washboard and the jug. In addition to common tableware, spoons that are joined at the handle are available from musical instrument suppliers.

== British folk music ==
As percussion, spoons accompany fiddle playing and other folk sets. An example is seen in Midsomer Murders Series 6, episode 2, where Detective Sergeant Gavin Troy plays the spoons at a house party joining a fiddle player who is entertaining the guests. He uses the first technique. The guests also contribute percussion by hand clapping in time with the music.

The song "This Old Man" refers to a related concept, except with sheep bones (hence paddywhack) instead of spoons.

== Canadian folk music ==
In Canada, the spoons accompany fiddle playing in Québecois and Acadian music. Also, Newfoundland and the Atlantic provinces popularly play the spoons at family gatherings. Playing the spoons in Western Canada is closely related to the Métis culture.

== Greek folk music ==
In Greece, spoons as a percussion instrument are known as koutalakia (Greek: κουταλάκια 'little spoons'). Dancers accompany their dancing with rhythms tapped out on the spoons. Many of them are sculpted or painted. The specific tradition is not common in the music of mainland Greece, but used to be popular among Anatolian Greeks.

== Russian folk music ==
Spoons are often used in ethnic Russian music and are known as lozhki (Russian: Ло́жки [plural]; Pronunciation: Ложка [singular]). The use of spoons for music dating at least from the 18th century (and probably older). Typically, three or more wooden spoons are used. The convex surfaces of the bowls are struck together in different ways. For example, two spoons are held by their handles in the left hand, and the third, held in the right hand, is used to hit the two spoons in the left hand. The hit, in a sliding motion, produces a typical sound. One can also hold three spoons in the left hand and put a fourth into the bot or the pocket. A fifth spoon is then held in the right hand and used to hit the other four. Finally, one can hold the bowl of a single spoon in the left hand and hit it with another spoon. In this style, different sounds can be emitted by holding the bowl more or less tightly.

These wooden spoons are commonly used in performances of Russian folk music and sometimes even in Russian orchestras. A video of a choir performing a Russian folk song with spoon and balalaika accompaniment can be found below.

== Turkish folk music ==
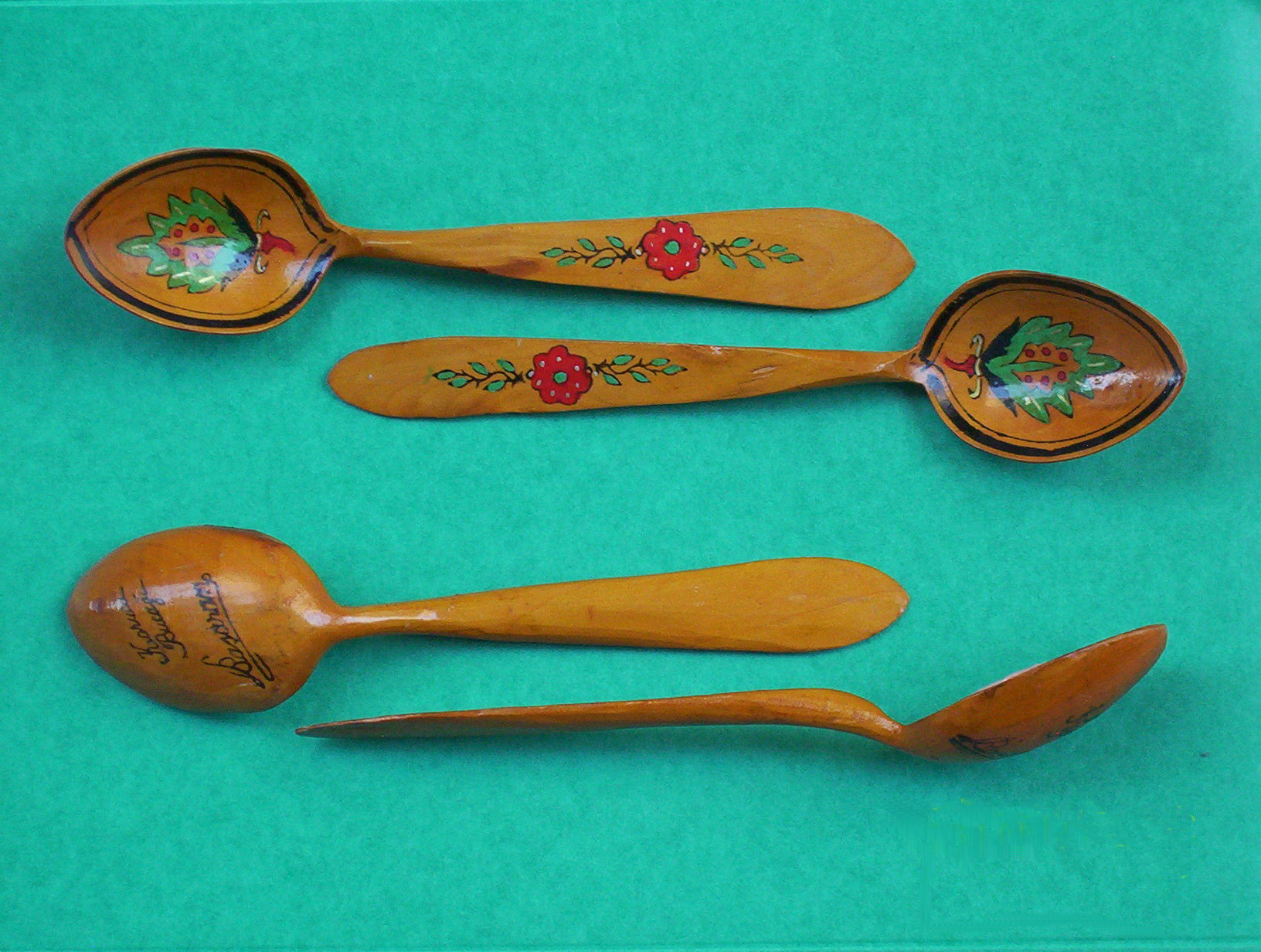

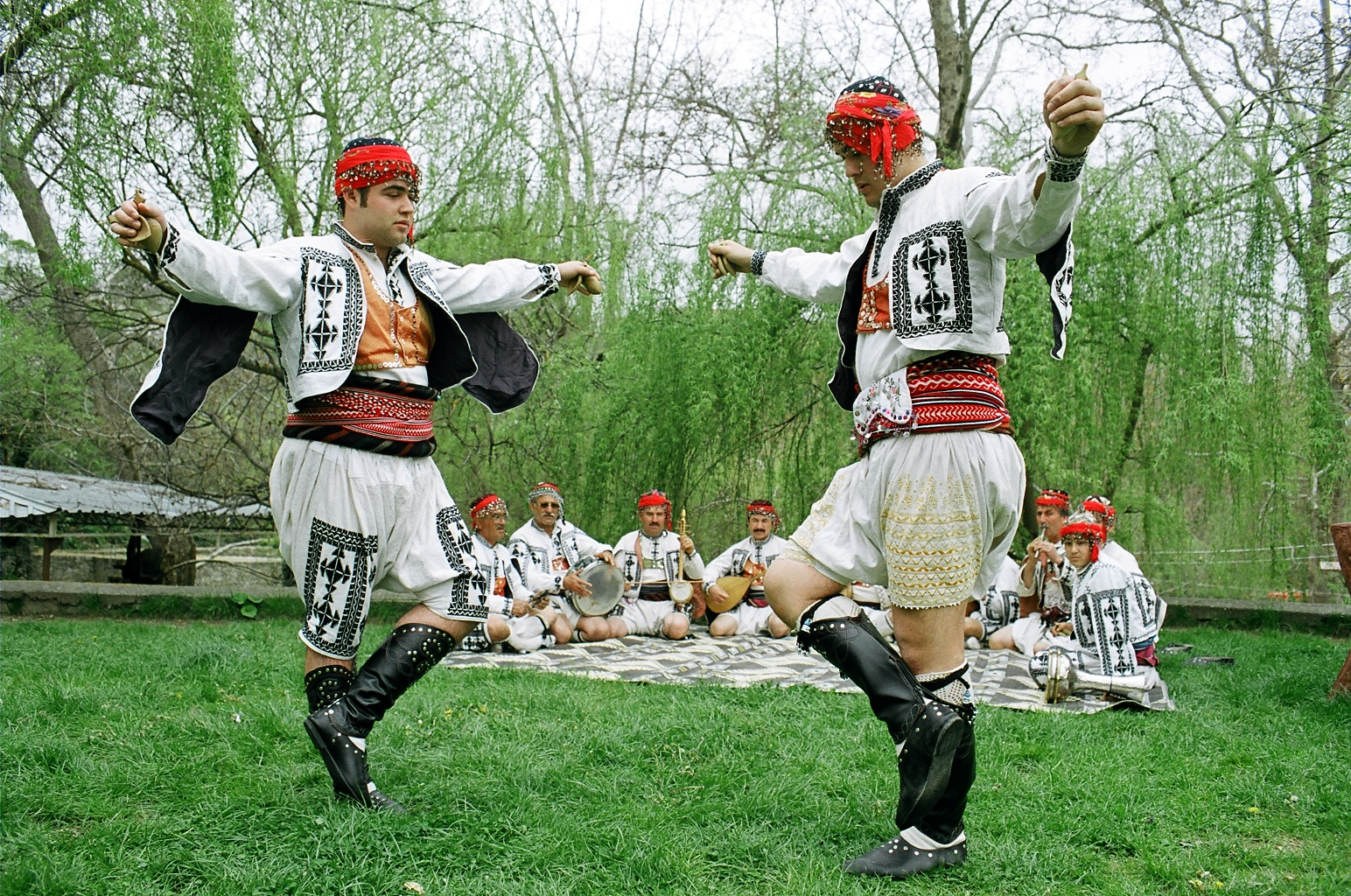
Balıkesir zeybek dance

Turkish spoons (Turkish: kaşıklar) are a Turkish and Uzbek percussion instrument. Kaşıklar made from boxwood are particularly favoured. There are also different holding styles.

1. The handle of one is taken between the long finger and ring finger, fingertips into the concave part, The Concave part of the second spoon is leaned against the base of the thumb in a back to back position with the first spoon. This is the most popular method used mostly with two spoons in each hand, hands up, dancing. Closing the fist clashes the pairs of spoons to each other. Sometimes the tips of the spoon handles in either hand are brushed against each other to get a different sound.
2. The handle of one spoon is held by the ring finger, thumb, and pointing finger, the handle of the other spoon is placed behind the ring finger, but on the inside of the little finger and the long finger in a back to back position with the first spoon. The ring finger works like a hinge and helps to hold both spoons. clasping the fingers lightly causes the spoons to hit each other. This holding style is essentially the same as holding salad spoons for single hand serving; except for this purpose the spoons should not be back to back.
3. The two spoons are held back to back on either side of the right hands index finger, the tips of the spoon handles are held lightly with the little and ring fingers the spoons are then hit down to the leg, up to the inside of the left hand, left thumb and index finger hold lightly and let both handles slip through to get several spoon sounds in one up down movement, spoon tips are allowed to skip over several left hand fingers or folds of the left sleeve to get a repetitive roll. This is the most popular method when sitting.
4. The left hand holds spoons as in the first style, a third spoon is pushed under the strap of the watch, and the right hand holds the fourth spoon. This is used when sitting.

== Musicians ==
- Abby the Spoon Lady (born 1981) is a popular street performer in the USA who plays the spoons.
- Artis the Spoonman (born 1948) is a Seattle street performer who was featured in the Soundgarden song "Spoonman"
- Duncan Campbell (born 1958) of UB40 is a British Reggae singer, and was once the only registered spoon player with the Musicians' Union in the United Kingdom.
- Noel Crombie (born 1953) incorporates spoons in his music.
- A. "Claude" Ferguson (1923–2006) published a 35-page booklet, "You, Too, Can Play the Spoons". Claude was featured in the July 2007 issue of the Highlights Magazine. "Spoonful of Music"
- Bobby Hebb (1938–2010) incorporated spoons in his music.
- British actor Sylvester McCoy, (born 1943) who most notably played the seventh incarnation of Doctor Who, is adept at playing the spoons, as evidenced during his tenure on Doctor Who as well as in his role in Ian McKellan's King Lear.
- Children's Singer, Eric Nagler (born 1942) plays the spoons.
- Sam Spoons (died 2018) was drummer and spoon performer of the Bonzo Dog Doo Dah Band.
- Sr. Coronar California traditional folk musician
- Russian president Boris Yeltsin (1931–2007) was known to enjoy performing with wooden spoons among his officials.
- Gerry Deveaux "Spoon Man" is a Canadian musician who is known for playing the spoons at the Broad Cove Scottish Concert. He also appeared on Ashley MacIsaac's "Hi™ How Are You Today?" album as a guest musician.
