= Fell on Black Days =

1994 single by Soundgarden

Single by Soundgarden

from the album Superunknown
- B-side: "Kyle Petty, Son of Richard"; "Girl U Want"; "Motorcycle Loop"
- Released: 1994
- Studio: Bad Animals (Seattle, Washington)
- Genre: Grunge; psychedelic rock
- Length: 4:42
- Label: A&M
- Songwriter: Chris Cornell
- Producers: Michael Beinhorn; Soundgarden

Soundgarden singles chronology
"My Wave" (1994)	"Fell on Black Days" (1994)	"Pretty Noose" (1996)

Music video
- "Fell on Black Days" on YouTube

"Fell on Black Days" is a song by the American rock band Soundgarden. It was released in 1994 as the final single from the band's fourth studio album, Superunknown (1994). The song peaked at number four on the Billboard Mainstream Rock Tracks chart. The song was included on Soundgarden's 1997 greatest hits album, A-Sides and the 2010 compilation Telephantasm as the Superunknown version on the single disc version and the video version on the Deluxe Edition.

== Composition ==
"Fell on Black Days" is a grunge and psychedelic rock song with blues influences. Written by frontman Chris Cornell, the time signature of the song is in 6/4. Cornell said, "On 'Fell on Black Days'; the drums are totally straight, even though the riff is in six, so it doesn't feel quirky at all." Guitarist Kim Thayil has said that Soundgarden usually did not consider the time signature of a song until after the band had written it, and said that the use of odd meters was "a total accident."

== Lyrics ==
Cornell was interviewed by Everett True on the song, stating:

"Fell on Black Days" was like this ongoing fear I've had for years ... It's a feeling that everyone gets. You're happy with your life, everything's going well, things are exciting—when all of a sudden you realize you're unhappy in the extreme, to the point of being really, really scared. There's no particular event you can pin the feeling down to, it's just that you realize one day that everything in your life is fucked!

== Release and reception ==
After "My Wave" was released as a single in September 1994, A&M subsequently issued "Fell on Black Days" as the next single later that year.

It appeared on Billboard magazine's Hot 100 Airplay chart, peaking at number 54 in its tenth week and remaining on the chart until its twentieth week. The song peaked at number 4 on the Billboard Mainstream Rock Tracks chart and number 13 on the Billboard Modern Rock Tracks chart.

Outside the United States, the single was released commercially in Australia and various European countries. In Canada, the song reached the top 70 on the Canadian Singles Chart and remained in the top 70 for two weeks. "Fell on Black Days" reached the top 50 in the Netherlands, and in Ireland it was a moderate top 20 success.

In 2017, Billboard ranked the song number one on their list of the 15 greatest Soundgarden songs, and in 2021, Kerrang! ranked the song number three on their list of the 20 greatest Soundgarden songs.

The song was featured twice on the TV show Supernatural in the episodes "Simon Said" and "Southern Comfort". The Vampire Diaries featured the song in the season 6 episode "Black Hole Sun" which in turn was named after Soundgarden's hit.

== Music video ==
The music video for "Fell on Black Days" was directed by Jake Scott, who would later direct the music video for "Burden in My Hand". The black-and-white video consists of a filmed live performance of the band in a studio, with Brendan O'Brien producing the recording. The video was filmed at Seattle's Bad Animals Studio in October 1994. The video was released in November 1994. It is available on the CD-ROM Alive in the Superunknown. The video version of the track can be found on the "Fell on Black Days" single, Songs from the Superunknown, and the deluxe edition of the band's 2010 compilation album Telephantasm.

== Track listings ==
All songs written by Chris Cornell, except where noted.

7-inch vinyl (US)

1. "Fell on Black Days" – 4:42
2. "My Wave" (Cornell, Thayil) – 5:12

7-inch vinyl (Europe and UK)

1. "Fell on Black Days" – 4:42
2. "Motorcycle Loop" (Thayil)
3. "Kyle Petty, Son of Richard" (Cornell, Thayil) – 4:07

CD (UK)

1. "Fell on Black Days" – 4:42
2. "Kyle Petty, Son of Richard" (Cornell, Kim Thayil) – 4:06
3. "Fell on Black Days" (video version) – 5:26

CD (UK)

1. "Fell on Black Days" – 4:42
2. "Girl U Want" (Gerald Casale, Mark Mothersbaugh) – 3:29
3. "Fell on Black Days" (demo) – 4:01

CD (Europe)

1. "Fell on Black Days" – 4:42
2. "My Wave" (live) (Cornell, Thayil) – 4:34
  - Recorded live on August 20, 1993, at Jones Beach Amphitheater in Wantagh, New York.

CD (Europe)

1. "Fell on Black Days" – 4:42
2. "Motorcycle Loop" (short version) (Thayil) – 1:32
3. "Girl U Want" (Casale, Mothersbaugh) – 3:29
4. "Fell on Black Days" (demo) – 4:03

CD (Europe)

1. "Fell on Black Days" – 4:42
2. "Kyle Petty, Son of Richard" (Cornell, Thayil) – 4:06
3. "Birth Ritual" (demo) (Cornell, Matt Cameron, Thayil) – 5:51
4. "Fell on Black Days" (live) – 4:52
  - Recorded live on August 16, 1993, at Pine Knob Music Theatre in Clarkston, Michigan.

CD (Australia)

1. "Fell on Black Days" – 4:42
2. "Kyle Petty, Son of Richard" (Cornell, Thayil) – 4:07

CD (Australia)

1. "Fell on Black Days" – 4:42
2. "Kyle Petty, Son of Richard" (Cornell, Thayil) – 4:07
3. "Fell on Black Days" (demo) – 4:04
4. "Motorcycle Loop" (short version) (Thayil) – 1:34
5. "Fell on Black Days" (live) – 4:52
  - Recorded live on August 16, 1993, at Pine Knob Music Theatre in Clarkston, Michigan.

== Chart positions ==
Chart (1994–1995)	Peak position
Australia (ARIA)	52
Canada Top Singles (RPM)	66
Europe (Eurochart Hot 100)	62
Finland (Suomen virallinen lista)	10
Iceland (Íslenski Listinn Topp 40)	11
Ireland (IRMA)	14
Netherlands (Single Top 100)	45
UK Singles (Official Charts)	24
US Radio Songs (Billboard)	54
US Mainstream Rock Airplay (Billboard)	4
US Alternative Airplay (Billboard)	13

Chart (2017)	Peak position
US Hot Rock & Alternative Songs (Billboard)	14
US Rock Digital Song Sales (Billboard)	6

== Certifications ==
Region	Certification	Certified units/sales
New Zealand (RMNZ)	Platinum	30,000^{‡}
^{‡} Sales+streaming figures based on certification alone.

== Release history ==
Release dates and formats for "Fell on Black Days"
Region	Date	Format(s)	Label(s)	Ref.
United States	1994	—N/a	A&M	
United Kingdom	January 23, 1995	7-inch vinyl; CD	A&M	
Australia	January 23, 1995	CD; cassette	Polydor	
