= Private Audition =

Studio album by Heart
- Released: May 20, 1982
- Recorded: October 1981 – March 1982
- Studios: Studio 56, Los Angeles, California; Wally Heider, San Francisco, California; Kaye-Smith, Seattle, Washington
- Genres: Hard rock; folk rock
- Length: 40:19
- Label: Epic
- Producers: Connie (Note: Connie is a pseudonym for Nancy Wilson, Sue Ennis, and Ann Wilson.); Howie

Heart chronology
Greatest Hits/Live (1980)	Private Audition (1982)	Passionworks (1983)

Singles from Private Audition
- 1. "This Man Is Mine" Released: May 1982; 2. "Bright Light Girl" Released: September 1982

Professional ratings
Review scores
Source	Rating
AllMusic	2/5 stars
Rolling Stone	3/5 stars
The Rolling Stone Album Guide	2.5/5 stars

Private Audition is the sixth studio album by American rock band Heart, released on May 20, 1982, by Epic Records. The album reached number 25 on the US Billboard 200, spending 14 weeks on the chart. It spawned the single "This Man Is Mine", which peaked at number 33 on the Billboard Hot 100. It is the last Heart album to feature longtime members Mike Derosier and Steve Fossen, who left after the recording of the album and were replaced by Denny Carmassi and Mark Andes.

In 2009, Private Audition was re-released by BGO Records as a double CD with the band's subsequent album, Passionworks (1983). Prior to this, Private Audition had been out of print for a number of years and was Heart's most difficult CD to obtain.

== Track listing ==
Side one
No.	Title	Writer(s)	Length
1.	"City's Burning"	Ann Wilson; Sue Ennis; Nancy Wilson	4:26
2.	"Bright Light Girl"	A. Wilson; Ennis; N. Wilson	3:19
3.	"Perfect Stranger"	A. Wilson; Ennis	3:51
4.	"Private Audition"	A. Wilson; Ennis; N. Wilson	3:19
5.	"Angels"	A. Wilson; Ennis	3:00
6.	"This Man Is Mine"	A. Wilson; Ennis; N. Wilson	3:00

Side two
No.	Title	Writer(s)	Length
7.	"The Situation"	N. Wilson; Michael Derosier	4:33
8.	"Hey Darlin Darlin"	A. Wilson; Ennis	3:43
9.	"One Word"	N. Wilson	4:32
10.	"Fast Times"	A. Wilson; Ennis; N. Wilson	3:51
11.	"America"	A. Wilson; Ennis	2:45

== Personnel ==
Credits adapted from the liner notes of Private Audition.

=== Heart ===
- Ann Wilson – vocals (all tracks); piano (tracks 3, 4); backing vocals (track 6); flutes (track 8); bass guitar (track 11)
- Nancy Wilson – second vocal (tracks 1, 6, 11); acoustic guitar (tracks 1, 2, 5, 6, 8, 10); electric piano, acoustic piano (track 2); bass guitar (tracks 2, 6); vocals (tracks 2–5, 7–9); acoustic six- and twelve-string guitars (track 3); electric guitar (tracks 4, 6, 7, 10); piano (track 4); piano strings (track 5); backing vocals (track 6); pedal steel guitar (track 9); blues harp
- Howard Leese – electric guitar (tracks 1–3, 7, 9, 10); synthesizers (tracks 1, 3, 4, 6, 9, 10); Moog drum (tracks 1, 7); acoustic guitar (tracks 2, 5, 8); orchestra bells (track 3); acoustic twelve-string (track 4); vocals (tracks 4, 5, 7, 8); piano strings (track 5); Hammond organ (tracks 6, 10); Moog bass, computer effects, clavioline (track 7); bass guitar, alto recorder (track 8); cymbal (track 11), strings score and conducting (tracks 3, 8, 11)
- Steve Fossen – bass (track 1, 3, 4, 9, 10)
- Michael Derosier – drums (tracks 1–4, 6–10)

=== Additional musicians ===
- Lynn Wilson – vocals (tracks 3, 4, 7, 8); backing vocals (track 6)
- Sue Ennis – piano (track 11)

=== Technical ===
- Connie – production
- Howie – production
- David Thoener – engineering, mixing at the Record Plant, mastering at Sterling Sound
- Shelly Yakus – engineering
- Brian Foraker – engineering assistance, mixing at the Record Plant
- Rob Perkins – engineering assistance
- Steve Marcantonio – mixing at the Record Plant (New York City)
- Greg Calbi – mastering at Sterling Sound (New York City)

=== Artwork ===
- Dale Windham – photography

== Charts ==
Chart performance for Private Audition
Chart (1982)	Peak position
Canada Top Albums/CDs (RPM)	21
UK Albums (Official Charts)	77
US Billboard 200	25
