= Artis the Spoonman =

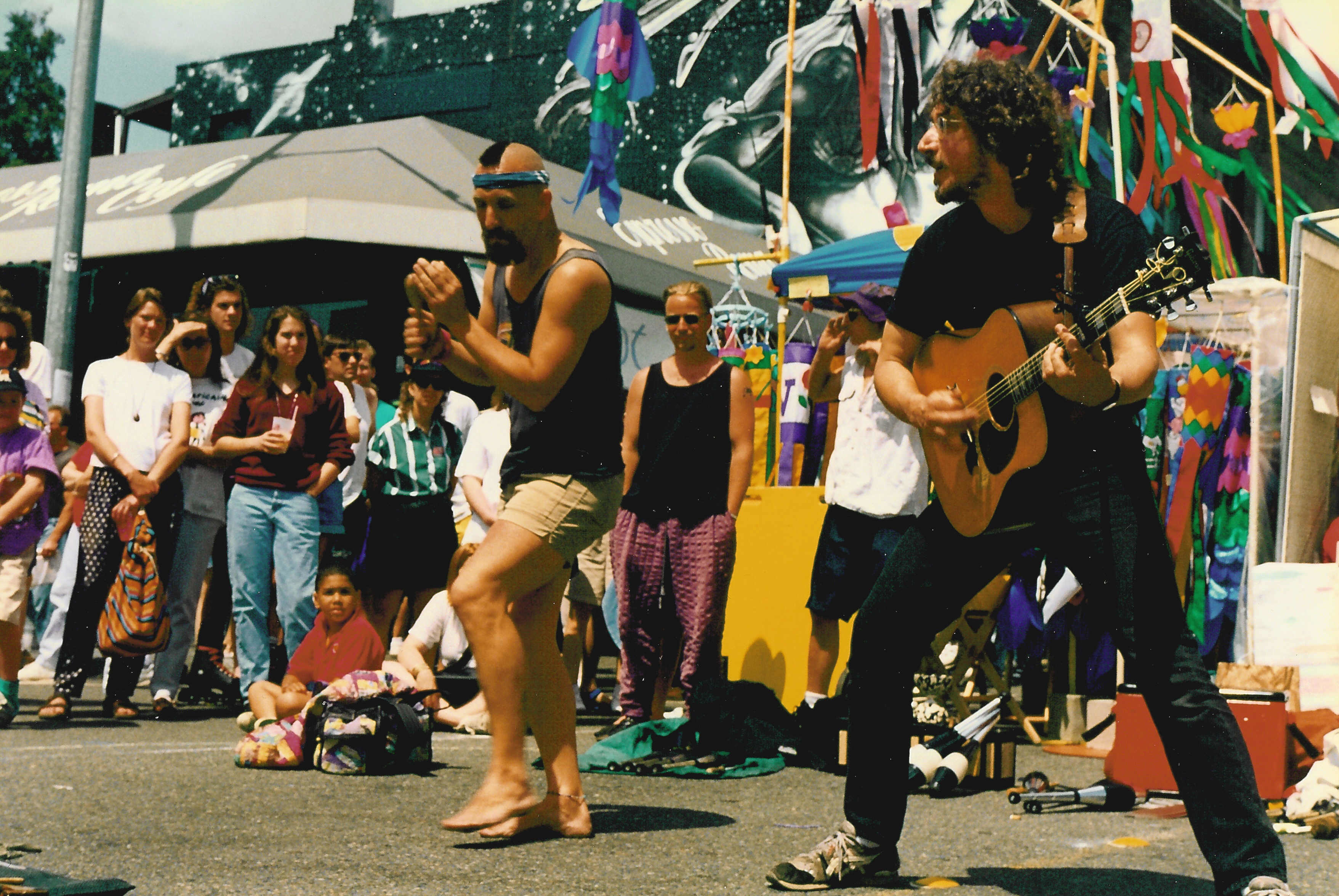
- Artis (left) performing with Jim Page at Seattle's University District Street Fair (1993)

Background information
- Born: October 3, 1948 (age 77); Kodiak, Alaska Territory, U.S.
- Origin: Seattle, Washington, USA
- Genres: Rock
- Occupations: Musician, entertainer
- Years active: 1972–present
- Label: Sapphire
- Website: artisthespoonman.net

Artis, known professionally as Artis the Spoonman (born October 3, 1948), is an American street performer and musician from Seattle, Washington, who uses spoons as a musical instrument.

He frequents the Pike Place Market accompanying singer/songwriter and guitarist Jim Page with his collection of spoons of different shapes and sizes and materials spread out on a blanket. In addition to spoons, he plays the flute and recorder. To the larger public, he is probably best known for his collaborations with Soundgarden and Frank Zappa. He has also performed internationally (Australia, Canada, Japan, USA) with multi-instrumentalist and tap dancing sax player Shoehorn, also known as MC Shoehorn, starting at Expo 88 in Australia.

== Career, performances ==
=== 1970s and 1980s ===
Artis had been active since 1972 as a street artist when he had his first collaboration with a major artist, appearing on stage with Frank Zappa in Eugene, Oregon, and at New York's Palladium, in 1981.

=== 1990s and later—collaboration with Soundgarden ===
In 1992, Artis made a guest appearance, (as local talent), at Bumbershoot, Seattle, which that year featured a lineup of acts including Soundgarden, who were to become instrumental in bringing Artis to the attention of a wider audience.

In 1993, he published a compilation of his poems and short stories called Artis-Aspirations to Manifestations from the Womb to the Void. In 1994, an NPR's Morning Edition focused on him and his rejection of material values. His song "Wake Up Call" opened the 1995 compilation Northwest Post-Grunge.

In the same year, he recorded "Spoonman" with Soundgarden, a song written by Chris Cornell, and named for and featuring Artis for an upcoming album Superunknown. He played the spoons in the song and appeared in the music video. On their 1994 tour, he opened up for the band in New York City, and Shepherd's Bush in London. The single charted at number three on the US Mainstream Rock Tracks chart and at number nine on the US Modern Rock Tracks chart. The song also became a top twenty hit on the UK Singles Chart. In 1995, the song won the Grammy Award for Best Metal Performance.

Chris Cornell commented:

It's more about the paradox of who [Artis] is and what people perceive him as. He's a street musician, but when he's playing on the street, he is given a value and judged completely wrong by someone else. They think he's a street person, or he's doing this because he can't hold down a regular job. They put him a few pegs down on the social ladder because of how they perceive someone who dresses differently. The lyrics express the sentiment that I much more easily identify with someone like Artis than I would watch him play.

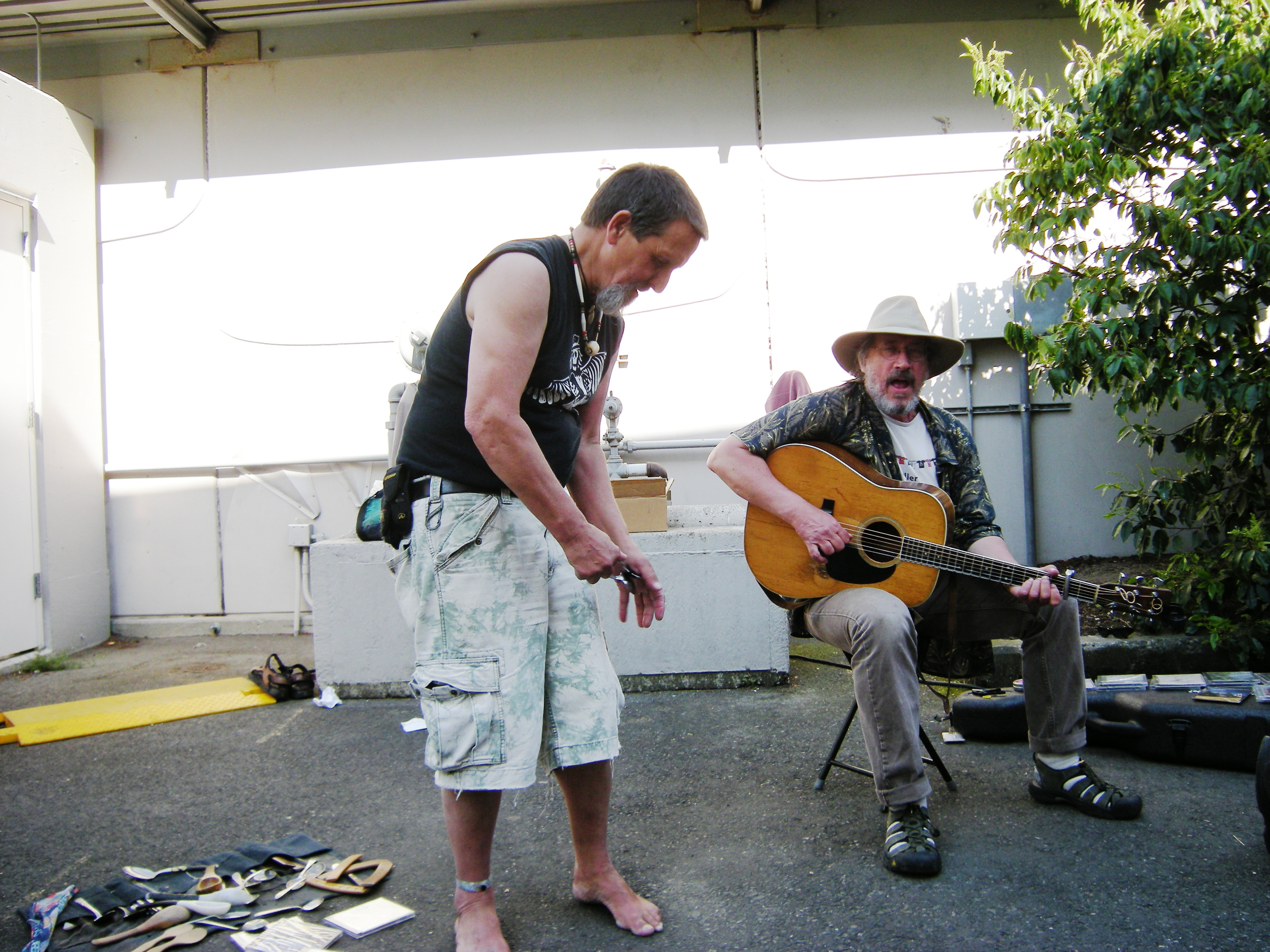
Artis and Jim Page in 2009

On November 10, 1995, he released an album titled Entertain the Entertainers. The album was rated four and a half stars out of five by Allmusic.com who called his release "an exceptional album showing off a very good range for an artist that would otherwise be known more for the gimmick of his chosen instruments, regardless of his abilities on them."

Artis has performed at many festivals, mostly in Canada and the United States. Other bands he has played with include Aerosmith and Phish, and he has been a featured performer at Seattle's Bumbershoot Festival (2003 and 2004) and the Oregon Country Fair. He was a featured performer at the 2013 Northwest Folklife Festival in Seattle.

Artis has made television appearances on Night Music with David Sanborn, BBC, and Late Night with David Letterman, among others. He plays an old man in the 1995 film Toast with the Gods.

== Personal life ==
Artis has stated he was a sailor in the United States Navy in the late 1960s, and worked for the United States Postal Service in the early 1970s.

Artis suffered a heart attack in 2002, and a benefit was organized for him in Seattle. He was reported as receiving state General Assistance Unemployable benefits from 2002 to 2010, and federal SSI benefits with alcoholism-related mental disability as of 2011.

Since 2009, he has lived in Port Townsend, Washington.

== Discography ==
- "World Beat Ragtime" by Shoehorn (Kutsubera Music, 1994)
- "Northwest Post-Grunge" various artists compilation (Elemental Records, 1994)
- ...Entertain the Entertainers (Sapphire Records, 1995)
- "Not for Sale" DVD 2001 video compilation spanning 1979-2000
- "A Livin' Spoonful" by Artis (2003)
- "The Blue Monk" by Shoehorn (Kutsubera Music, 2008)
- " Finally" by Artis 2018

He also recorded a session for Frank Zappa.

== See also ==
- Spoon (musical instrument)
