= The No WTO Combo =

Punk rock band (1999)

- Jello Biafra and Kim Thayil as part of The No WTO Combo, December 1, 1999

Background information
- Genres: Spoken word, hardcore punk
- Years active: 1999
- Label: Alternative Tentacles
- Past members: Jello Biafra; Krist Novoselic; Kim Thayil; Gina Mainwal
- Website: Artist page on Alternative Tentacles website

The No WTO Combo was a one-shot punk rock band started by Krist Novoselic (former Nirvana bassist). The band consisted of Jello Biafra (former frontman of Dead Kennedys); guitarist Kim Thayil of Soundgarden; and the rhythm section of Sweet 75, with Gina Mainwal on drums and Novoselic on bass.

They were originally scheduled to play the Showbox November 30, the night before the WTO meeting of 1999 in Seattle, but the performance was canceled because the venue's staff could not get past the police "curfew zone."

They rescheduled the show for the next night, December 1, but Biafra and Novoselic played a short acoustic set that night down the street at The Central Tavern, where Biafra was approached by local record producer Mark Cavener. Cavener offered to record the album at the Showbox the next evening. The performance itself would be the first formal concert played by Thayil since the demise of Soundgarden a few years beforehand, and only the second time Biafra had played music in a planned live setting since Dead Kennedys split in 1986. (Note: He had done one live show with his post-Kennedys project Lard in 1990, and assorted impromptu guest spots with Ministry, D.O.A., and other bands since 1987.)

Novoselic later asked Jack Endino to mix the recordings, resulting in the bands' only release, Live from the Battle in Seattle, distributed by Biafra's record label Alternative Tentacles.

== Band members ==
- Jello Biafra – vocals
- Kim Thayil – guitar
- Krist Novoselic – bass
- Gina Mainwal – drums
