= This Man Is Mine (song) =

Single by Heart

from the album Private Audition
- B-side: "America"
- Released: May 1982
- Recorded: October 19, 1981
- Genre: Hard rock, folk rock
- Length: 3:01
- Label: Epic
- Songwriter(s): Ann Wilson; Nancy Wilson; Sue Ennis
- Producer(s): Ann Wilson; Nancy Wilson; Connie & Howie

Heart singles chronology
"Unchained Melody" (1981)	"This Man Is Mine" (1982)	"How Can I Refuse?" (1983)

"This Man Is Mine" is a song recorded by the rock band Heart. It was released in 1982 as the first single from the band's sixth studio album Private Audition.

== Background ==
The song is in homage to The Supremes, which can also be inferred from the video of this song.

== Reception ==
Cash Box said it has "a smokey groove that will be a pleasant revelation to many." Billboard said that "Paced by snapping fingers and lush choral harmonies, it's a midtempo showcase for Ann Wilson's sultry vocal."

== Personnel ==
Credits adapted from the liner notes of Private Audition.

Heart

- Ann Wilson – lead vocals, backing vocals
- Nancy Wilson – electric guitar, bass, backing vocals
- Howard Leese – Hammond organ, synthesizers
- Michael Derosier – drums

Additional musicians

- Lynn Wilson – backing vocals

== Charts ==
"This Man Is Mine" was the only charting single released from Private Audition, peaking at number thirty-three on the U.S. Billboard Hot 100.

Chart (1982)	Peak position
Netherlands (Tipparade)	18
US Billboard Hot 100	33
US Mainstream Rock (Billboard)	16
US Cash Box Top 100	29
