= Studio X =

Recording studio in Seattle, Washington, US

Coordinates: 47.615023°N 122.343072°W

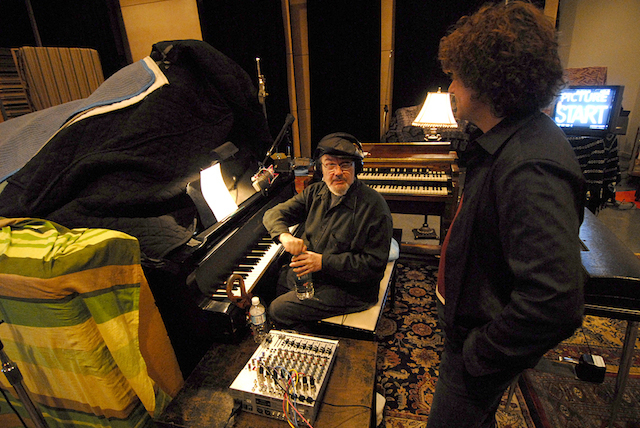
- Anthony Marinelli (right) and Dr. John (left) at Studio X in 2007
- Company type: Recording studio
- Industry: Music
- Founded: 1979; 47 years ago Seattle, Washington, U.S.
- Founder: Steve and Debbie Lawson
- Successor: Steve Lawson Productions
- Website: www.badanimals.com

Studio X (formerly known as Bad Animals Studio and Kaye-Smith Studios) is a music and media recording studio in Seattle, Washington, United States. Originally part of the Kaye-Smith Enterprises media conglomerate founded by Lester Smith and actor Danny Kaye, the studio was used to record commercials and musical performances. The studio was re-launched as Steve Lawson Productions by Steve and Debbie Lawson in 1979. The sisters Ann and Nancy Wilson of the band Heart owned the studio from 1991 until 1997, and named it Bad Animals after their 1987 album of the same name. Artists such as Heart, Alice in Chains, Pearl Jam, Soundgarden, Nirvana, Queensrÿche, Mad Season, Foo Fighters, Audioslave, Aerosmith, The Beach Boys, Jerry Cantrell, Eddie Vedder, Duff McKagan, Johnny Cash, B.B. King, Radiohead, R.E.M., Deftones, Soulfly, Steve Vai, KMFDM, and Neil Young have recorded at the studio.

== History ==
In 1991, Nancy and Ann Wilson of the band Heart entered into a partnership with Steve Lawson, who owned Kaye-Smith Studios where many of their 1970s hits, as well as their 1980 album Bébé le Strange, had been recorded. They upgraded the facility to the state-of-the-art, and renamed it Bad Animals Studio. The studio was named after Heart's 1987 album, Bad Animals. Ann and Nancy sold the studio back to the Lawsons in 1997, and it was renamed Studio X.

Several of the Humongous Entertainment games were also recorded by Bad Animals Studios.

In May 1993, Nirvana entered Bad Animals Studios to remix the songs "Heart-Shaped Box" and "All Apologies" for their album In Utero.

The music video for Soundgarden's 1994 single "Fell on Black Days" was filmed at the studio.

In 1997, Steve Lawson sold Bad Animals to Mike McAuliffe, Dave Howe, Charlie Nordstrom and Tom McGurk.

In 1998, the Spice Girls recorded vocals for the song "Boyfriend/Girlfriend", their contribution to the South Park soundtrack at the studio.

In 2001, Bill Brown recorded all of the music for Microsoft's Windows XP operating system with a live orchestra at the studio.

On September 1, 2003, Seattle radio station KNDD 107.7 The End hosted a solo acoustic performance by Thom Yorke at Studio X.

In October 2017, the studio was purchased for $21.6 million by Skanska, which plans to build a 346-unit multifamily tower with ground-floor retail in the building.

On October 31, 2018, Studio X, now managed by Reed Ruddy, moved its location from Belltown to Capitol Hill. Alice in Chains' 2018 album Rainier Fog was the last album recorded at the original studio.

== Albums recorded at Bad Animals/Studio X ==
Partial list.

- Bachman-Turner Overdrive II (1973)
- Bette Midler (1973) – Bette Midler (as Kaye-Smith Studios)
- Not Fragile (1974)
- Track of the Cat (1975) – Dionne Warwick (overdubbing) (as Kaye-Smith Studios)
- Little Queen (1977) – Heart (as Kaye-Smith Studios)
- M.I.U. Album (1978) – The Beach Boys (as Kaye-Smith Studios)
- Bébé le Strange (1980) – Heart (as Kaye-Smith Studios)
- Greatest Hits/Live (1980) – Heart (as Kaye-Smith Studios)
- Private Audition (1982) – Heart (as Kaye-Smith Studios)
- Metal Church (1984) - Metal Church (as Steve Lawson Productions)
- Automatic For The People (1992) – R.E.M. (mixing)
- Inhaler (1993) – Tad (mixing)
- Desire Walks On (1993) – Heart
- Superunknown (1994) – Soundgarden
- Live Through This (1994) – Hole (mixing)
- Live Alien Broadcasts (1994) – Tad
- Vitalogy (1994) – Pearl Jam
- Above (1995) – Mad Season
- Mirror Ball (1995) – Neil Young
- The Road Home (1995) – Heart (mixing)
- Adrenaline (1995) – Deftones
- Lucy (1995) – Candlebox (mixing)
- Alice in Chains (1995) – Alice in Chains
- Down on the Upside (1996) – Soundgarden
- New Adventures in Hi-Fi (1996) – R.E.M.
- Yield (1998) – Pearl Jam
- Boggy Depot (1998) – Jerry Cantrell
- Heart Presents A Lovemongers' Christmas (1998) – Heart
- 13 Ways to Bleed on Stage (2000) – Cold
- My Favourite Headache (2000) – Geddy Lee
- Riot Act (2002) – Pearl Jam
- Audioslave (2002) – Audioslave
- Deftones (2003) – Deftones
- Savages (2003) – Soulfly
- Some Devil (2003) – Dave Matthews
- Transatlanticism (2003) – Death Cab for Cutie
- In Between Evolution (2004) - The Tragically Hip
- Catch Without Arms (2005) – Dredg
- Pearl Jam (2006) – Pearl Jam
- Into the Wild (2007) – Eddie Vedder
- Ukulele Songs (2011) – Eddie Vedder
- Fanatic (2012) – Heart
- The Heist (2012) – Macklemore & Ryan Lewis
- King Animal (2012) – Soundgarden
- Lightning Bolt (2013) – Pearl Jam
- Satyricon (2013) – Satyricon
- Rainier Fog (2018) – Alice in Chains

== Film scores recorded at Bad Animals/Studio X ==
- Army of Darkness (1992)
- Dennis the Menace (1993)
- 10 Things I Hate About You (1999)
- Office Space (1999)
- PT Barnum (1999)
- The Way of the Gun (2000)
- The Wedding Planner (2001)
- Vanilla Sky (2001)
- A Walk to Remember (2002)
- Big Fish (2003)
- Eternal Sunshine of the Spotless Mind (2004)
- Club Dread (2004)
- Kiss Kiss Bang Bang (2005)
- Into the Wild (2007)
- Orphan (2009)
- The Blind Side (2009)
- Eat Pray Love (2010)
- Carol (2014)
- The Founder (2016)

== Video game scores recorded at Bad Animals/Studio X ==
- Halo 2 Original Soundtrack (2004)
- Star Wars: Republic Commando (2005)
- Halo 3 Original Soundtrack (2007)
- The Incredible Hulk (2008)
- Halo: Reach Original Soundtrack (2010)
- Solitaire Blitz (2012)
- Plants vs. Zombies Adventures (2013)
- Destiny Original Soundtrack (2014)
- Peggle 2 Original Soundtrack (2014)
- Age of Empires II (2013)
- Heroes of Skyrealm (2016)
