= Kim Thayil =

American guitarist (born 1960)

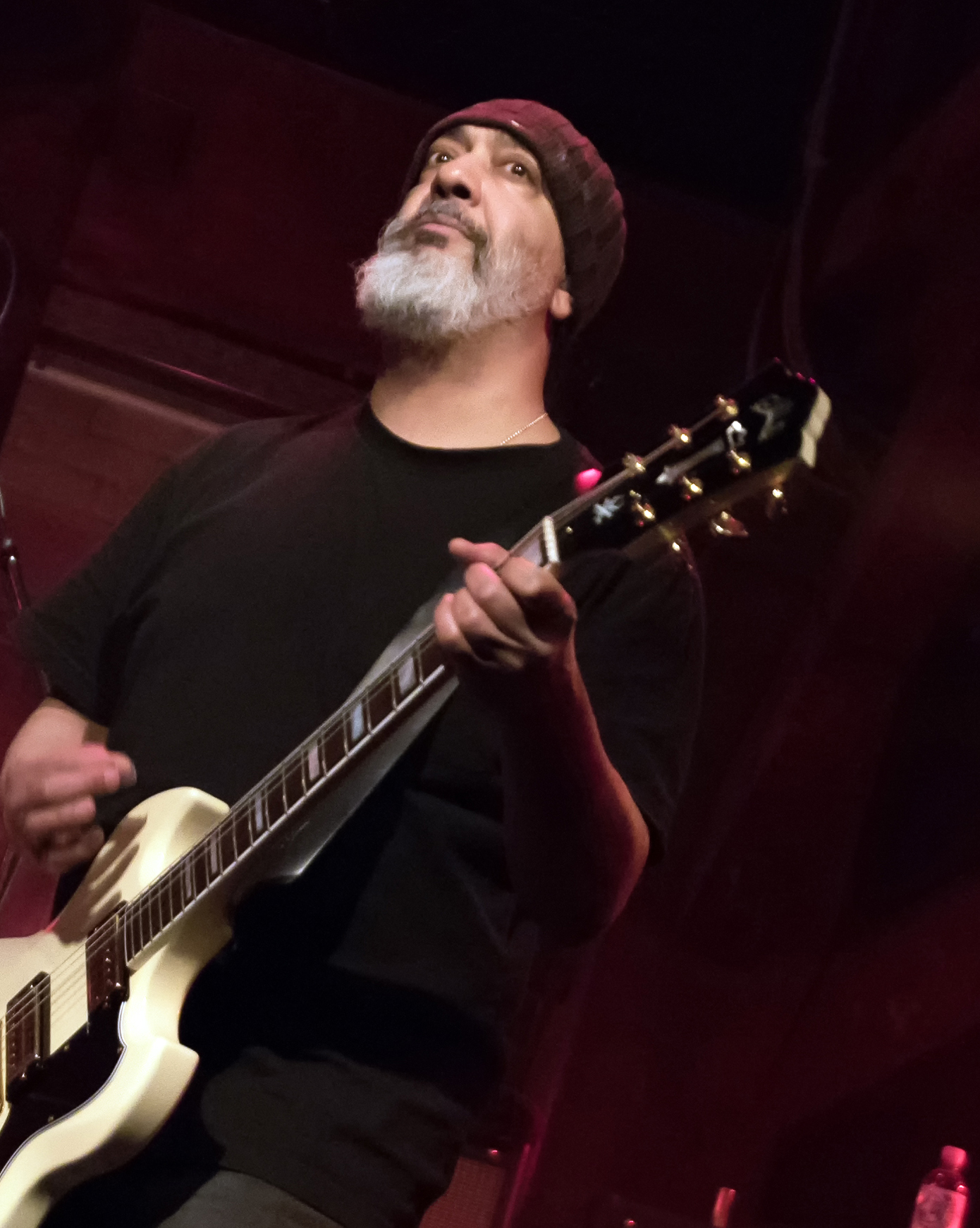
- Thayil performing with MC50 in 2018

Background information
- Born: Kim Anand Thayil; September 4, 1960 (age 66); Seattle, Washington, U.S.
- Genres: Alternative metal; grunge; alternative rock; heavy metal; hard rock
- Occupations: Musician; songwriter
- Instrument: Guitar
- Years active: 1980–present
- Member of: 3rd Secret
- Formerly of: Bozo and the Pinheads; Identity Crisis; Soundgarden; No WTO Combo; MC50

Kim Anand Thayil (born September 4, 1960) is an American musician best known as the lead guitarist of the Seattle-based rock band Soundgarden, which he co-founded with singer Chris Cornell and bassist Hiro Yamamoto in 1984. Cornell and Thayil remained as the original members of the band until Cornell's death in 2017, and the band's subsequent split in 2018. Thayil was named the 100th greatest guitarist of all time by Rolling Stone in 2010, and the 67th greatest guitarist of all time by SPIN in 2012. Thayil has won two Grammy Awards as a member of Soundgarden.

He was inducted into the Rock and Roll Hall of Fame as a member of Soundgarden in 2025.

== Biography ==
=== Childhood and early life ===
Born in Seattle, Washington in 1960, Thayil grew up in the Chicago suburb of Park Forest. His Protestant Malayali parents came from the state of Kerala in India to Seattle. His mother was a music teacher who studied to be a concert pianist at the Royal Academy of Music. His father earned a degree in chemical engineering, received employment in Chicago and moved there with his family.

Thayil started writing lyrics at 12 years old. In 1977, he formed his first band in Chicago, Bozo and the Pinheads, a punk rock band. They did both original songs (written by Thayil and inspired by his punk music tastes) and cover tunes (mostly Sex Pistols, Devo, and Ramones). Their first gig was at a school talent show for an audience of about 500 people.

He played guitar in a post-punk band called Identity Crisis in 1980 and released a 7-inch EP called Pretty Feet.

Thayil met Hiro Yamamoto at Rich East High School in Park Forest. He graduated, along with Hiro Yamamoto, from the Active Learning Process School (ALPS) at Rich East High School in 1979, the same school Bruce Pavitt graduated from two years earlier, in 1977. He and Yamamoto decided to move to Olympia, Washington, to study at The Evergreen State College, but they were unable to find jobs and decided to move to Seattle. There, Thayil was a DJ for KCMU and earned a degree in philosophy at the University of Washington. In Seattle they also met Chris Cornell, a roommate, and the three formed Soundgarden in 1984.

=== Soundgarden (1984–1997) ===
Soundgarden became the first of Seattle's grunge bands to sign with a major label (A&M Records). They went on to release five albums, including three which went platinum at least once, and won two Grammys.

Thayil became acclaimed for his guitar work, which was typically characterized by heavy riffing, and was cited among other grunge guitarists as an influence and a pioneer of the "Seattle Sound." In 1994, Thayil commented, "I think Soundgarden is a pretty good band and I'm a fine guitarist. I'm not God, but I'm certainly not average. I feel very comfortable with the fact that not many other people can do what I do on guitar. I think my guitar is happy with the way I play it."

Originally one of Soundgarden's main songwriters, Thayil's contributions as a writer eventually dwindled to just one song on Down on the Upside, "Never the Machine Forever", although he contributed to details in every song, as did every band member. Thayil explained that "Collaboration was paramount in our early music, especially right at the beginning when it was me on guitar, Hiro on bass and Chris on drums", but eventually all four members became songwriters of their own, "all writing guitar parts that I had to learn." This led him to do "Never the Machine Forever" all on his own, as Thayil thought "Well, if I'm going to have a song on this fucking record, I'm going to have to write lyrics."

While a member of Soundgarden, he cowrote many songs for the band, including "Hunted Down", "Flower", "Hands All Over", "Jesus Christ Pose", "Room a Thousand Years Wide", and "My Wave".

=== Post-Soundgarden (1997–2010) ===
Thayil joined singer Johnny Cash, bassist Krist Novoselic of Nirvana and drummer Sean Kinney of Alice in Chains for a cover of Willie Nelson's "Time of the Preacher", featured on the tribute album Twisted Willie, released in January 1996.

After the 1997 breakup of Soundgarden, Thayil went on to contribute guitar to work by Pigeonhed and Presidents of the United States of America. More recently, he contributed guitar to the track "Blood Swamp" from the 2006 Sunn O)))/Boris album Altar, for which he also wrote liner notes. Thayil also plays lead guitar on a track called "V.O.G." by Ascend, which features Gentry Densley (Iceburn, Eagle Twin) and Greg Anderson (Sunn O))), Engine Kid, Goatsnake). Ascend's record, titled Ample Fire Within, was released in 2008 by Southern Lord Records.

In 1999, Thayil formed a punk band, the No WTO Combo, with Jello Biafra (formerly of Dead Kennedys), Krist Novoselic (formerly of Nirvana, at the time a member of Sweet 75), and Gina Mainwal (also of Sweet 75). The band was formed to celebrate and further the rampant protest activity against the WTO Ministerial Conference of 1999, which was held on November 30, 1999. Originally scheduled to play at The Showbox on that same evening, police prevented the band from doing so, forcing the show to be rescheduled for the following night. This was Thayil's first live concert since the breakup of Soundgarden. The show was recorded by Mark Cavener and mixed by Soundgarden producer Jack Endino; it was released as the album Live from the Battle in Seattle in May 2000.

In 2003, Rolling Stone magazine named Thayil #100 on the list of the "100 greatest guitarists of all time".

In 2004, Thayil played guitar for Probot, Dave Grohl's heavy metal side-project; he was featured on the songs "Ice Cold Man" and "Sweet Dreams".

Thayil was a recurring participant on the Almost Live! sketch comedy show, calling things "lame" during "The Lame List" segments.

In 2009, Thayil played with Soundgarden's Matt Cameron and Ben Shepherd at a show in Seattle on March 24, 2009, at the Crocodile Cafe that was headlined by Tom Morello's The Nightwatchman. It was the first time the three had played together in public since the band's 1997 breakup. The three were joined by Tad Doyle of fellow 1990s Seattle band TAD, and performed three Soundgarden songs. For the last song ("Spoonman") they were joined by Tom Morello (Morello had played the song before with Audioslave). Thayil has also played with Greg Gilmore of Mother Love Bone and Danny Kelly of Heliotroupe in the group Set & Setting. Their debut performance was October 31, 2009, above the famed K Records warehouse now known as the Cherry Street Loft ("The Loft on Cherry") in Olympia, Washington.

=== Soundgarden reunion (2010–2017) ===
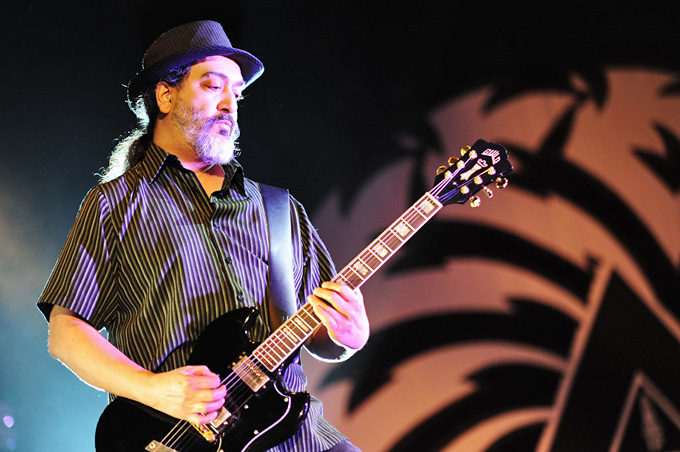
Thayil with Soundgarden in 2012

On January 1, 2010, it was announced through Facebook and Twitter posts by Chris Cornell that the official Soundgarden fanclub had been restarted. On April 15, 2010, it was announced that Soundgarden would play its first show since 1997 the following day at the Showbox at the Market in its Seattle hometown. The band played under the name 'Nudedragons', an anagram for Soundgarden.

On August 5, 2010, the band played their first reunion show under the Soundgarden name at The Vic Theatre in Chicago. Three days later, they headlined the final night of Lollapalooza in Grant Park.

In September 2010, the band released the compilation album Telephantasm. November 2012 saw the release of King Animal, their first studio album since 1996.

In 2012, Thayil voiced a character in Season IV: Church of the Black Klok's "Dethcamp" in the Adult Swim original series Metalocalypse.

On May 18, 2017, Chris Cornell was found dead in his hotel room, cancelling the rest of their tour and the band was disbanded again in 2018, with the exception of their one-off show of Tribute to Chris Cornell in January 2019.

=== Projects outside Soundgarden ===
In March 2018, it was announced that original member of the proto punk band MC5, Wayne Kramer would embark on a 35 date tour of North America for their 50th anniversary of the band's debut Kick Out the Jams, recruiting Thayil to play guitar along with Brendan Canty of Fugazi, Doug Pinnick of King's X, and Marcus Durant of Zen Guerrilla.

In 2020, Thayil played guitar solos on the song "The Firebird" for the jazz fusion band, the Barret Martin Group. In 2021, he played lead guitar and Matt Cameron played drums for a track, "Only Love Can Save Me Now", on the new The Pretty Reckless album. The Pretty Reckless frontwoman Taylor Momsen said that without Thayil, recording the track would have been impossible, as "Kim is a master – there's no-one else like him." In December 2020, Thayil, Krist Novoselic, Jennifer Johnson, Jillian Raye, Jeff Fielder and Ben Smith performed the song "Drone" at the Seattle Museum of Pop Culture's tribute to Alice in Chains. In 2021, Thayil appeared on Mastodon's double album Hushed and Grim, playing lead guitar on the track "Had It All".

In 2021, Thayil, along with drummer Matt Cameron, bassist Krist Novoselic, guitarist Bubba Dupree, and vocalists Jennifer Johnson and Jillian Raye, formed the group 3rd Secret. Their self-titled debut album, which they recorded at The Bait Shop in Bellevue, Washington with producer Jack Endino, was released in April 2022. The group also performed at the Museum of Pop Culture in Seattle.

In 2024, Thayil appeared on Bear McCreary's epic rock concept album, graphic novel, and concert experience - "The Singularity".

In 2025, Thayil was inducted into the Rock and Roll Hall of Fame, as a member of Soundgarden.

Thayil recorded a cover version of "The Day I Tried To Live" with King Ultramega to celebrate the induction of Soundgarden into the Rock & Roll Hall of Fame.

In June 2026, Thayil published his autobiography entitled A Screaming Life: Into the Superunknown With Soundgarden and Beyond, co-authored with Seattle writer Adem Tepedelen. In it, the guitarist talks about his youth in Park Forest, his experiences as a founding member of Soundgarden and his projects beyond the band.

== Equipment ==
=== Guild S-100 ===
Thayil's primary guitar is the Guild S-100—a Gibson SG-style model—which he first purchased for $250 at the age of 18. While Thayil felt his friends would have preferred he buy a more traditional guitar like a Fender Stratocaster or Gibson Les Paul, Thayil did not have the money and liked the S-100, which he felt was easy to play thanks to its "fast" neck and low action. He also liked the S-100 for its unique microphonic pickup: he could blow on it or speak into it and produce a "weird feedback and hum" that he would later implement into his playing style in Soundgarden. The S-100's large gap between the bridge and tailpiece also enabled Thayil to achieve more sounds when playing behind the bridge.

When Soundgarden shot to fame in the early 1990s, the S-100—discontinued over ten years earlier—had been an obscure guitar model that was suddenly in demand thanks to Thayil. A first attempt at an S-100 signature guitar for Thayil never came to fruition due to Fender purchasing Guild in 1995 and then Soundgarden's 1997 break-up. A second attempt was made when Soundgarden reunited, but Guild was shut down and sold again with only a few prototypes having been produced. A signature model, the Guild Kim Thayil Signature S-100 Polara, was finally realized in 2023, with both a USA-made version and a more affordable import model.

=== Other gear ===
Thayil has also used Guild's S-300 model, which came equipped with a DiMarzio PAF in the neck and Super Distortion in the bridge position, and which his bandmates preferred for its "beefier" sound. Other guitars Thayil has used include the Gibson ES-335 and Fender Telecaster.

Thayil uses Mesa/Boogie amplifiers, combining a Dual Rectifier Trem-O-Verb combo and an Electrdyne head. Both amps are dialed to produce heavy amounts of distortion, with the Trem-O-Verb providing a more compressed, midrange-heavy tone and the Electradyne providing more lows and highs. Thayil runs these amps into 4x12 speaker cabinets with Celestion Vintage 30s.

Before Chris Cornell began playing guitar in Soundgarden, Thayil did not use distortion pedals, as he felt that being the sole guitarist meant there was nothing "constraining" him when soloing. After Cornell began contributing guitar parts, Thayil started using pedals like the Ibanez Tube Screamer to help "cut through" the mix, although later in his career he began to prefer boost pedals rather than distortion or fuzz, which he feels compromises his tone and the dynamics of his playing. Thayil has also used the Ibanez CS9 chorus, Rotovibe, and Dunlop Cry Baby, the last of which he mostly uses to alter the timbre of his sound as opposed to using it for its characteristic "wah" effect.

== Discography ==
Soundgarden

No WTO Combo

- Live from the Battle in Seattle (2000)

Probot

- Probot (2004)

Sunn O))) and Boris

- Altar (2006)

3rd Secret

- 3rd Secret (2022)
- The 2nd 3rd Secret (2023)
