= Dalbello discography =

- Studio albums: 6

The discography of Canadian singer Lisa Dal Bello (a.k.a. Dalbello) consists of one EP, six studio albums, one live album, multiple singles, as well as collaborations with other artists and various other solo songs. Although never commercially released, her first releases appear on broadcast recordings by CBC Radio. Her debut studio album Lisa Dal Bello, produced by David Foster and featuring musicians of the band Toto, was released in 1977 by MCA Records. Her second studio album, Pretty Girls (1979), was released independently by Talisman Records. Capitol Records released three studio albums of hers, Drastic Measures (1981), whomanfoursays (1984) and she (1987), the latter two are released under the name Dalbello. whore, her most recent album, was released in 1996 by EMI Electrola. A live album, Live at Rockpalast, recorded in 1985, was released by Repertoire Records in 2015.

== Albums ==
=== Studio albums ===
- Lisa Dal Bello (1977)
- Pretty Girls (1979)
- Drastic Measures (1981)
- whomanfoursays (1984)
- she (1987)
- whore (1996)

=== Live albums ===
- Live at Rockpalast (2015)

== EPs ==
- Lisa Dal Bello – EP (1974, CBC Radio Canada)

Lisa Dal Bello was released when Lisa Dal Bello was 14 years old, and was her recording debut. The record was made for CBC Radio, Canada's national broadcaster, and was produced by Jack Budgell. It had catalogue number LM-230. It was not commercially available, and airplay was legally restricted to the CBC only.

Tracks, all written by Dalbello, are:

- A1: Mourning in the Morning
- A2: The Old Man
- B1: Come Sun Days
- B2: Human

== Singles ==
- "(Don't Want To) Stand in Your Way / Day Dream" (1977)
- "My Mind's Made Up / Snow White" (1977)
- "Pretty Girls / Dreams Are for Lovers" (1978) (#84 CAN)
- "Still in Love / Hollywood" (1978)
- "Never Get to Heaven / Dr. Noble" (1981)
- "She Wants to Know / Bad Timing" (1981)
- "Just Like You / What Your Mama Don't Know" (1981)
- "Gonna Get Close to You / Guilty by Association" (1984) (#77 CAN)
- "Animal" (1984)
- "Black on Black / Baby Doll" (1985)
- "Tango / Why Stand Alone" (1987)
- "Talk to Me / Imagination" (1987) (#84 CAN)
- "Immaculate Eyes" (1987)
- "eLeVeN / Whore" (1995)
- "Heavy Boots" (1995)
- "O Lil' Boy" (1995)

== Music videos ==
- Gonna Get Close to You (1984)
- Tango (1987)
- Talk to Me (1987)
- eLeVeN (1995)

== Other songs ==
- "Always Thinking About You" (2003) - an original song written and performed for a Cheer laundry detergent TV ad.
- "(Faith in You) With All Your Heart" (1999) - an original song written and performed for a Ford Focus TV ad.
- "You're My Day" (1977) - available on Jay Graydon's compilation album "Past To Present: The 70's".
- "Start Today" (Alex Lifeson featuring Lisa Dalbello) (1996) from Alex Lifeson's 1996 solo album "Victor". Lisa Dalbello is doing the lead vocals.
- "Something's Happening Here" (1986) - the theme song for "EXPO 86".
- "March of the Arches" (David Suzuki featuring Lisa Dalbello) (recorded in the early 1980s) - featured on David Suzuki's album "Space Child", an educational album for children. It is available in some regions on iTunes. Lisa Dalbello provides the lead vocals.
- "Eyes" (David Suzuki featuring Lisa Dalbello) (recorded in the early 1980s) - featured on David Suzuki's album "Space Child", an educational album for children. It is available in some regions on iTunes. Lisa Dalbello provides the lead vocals.
- "Wheels" (Lisa Dalbello featuring Tim Thorney) (recorded in the early 1980s) - featured on David Suzuki's album "Space Child", an educational album for children. It is available in some regions on iTunes. Lisa Dalbello shares the lead vocals with Tim Thorney.
- "The Sins of Dorian Gray" is the theme song of the 1983 movie with the same title.
- "Cry" (1996) - an unreleased demo outtake from the "whore" sessions.
- "I Do What I Do (Solo version)" - a demo outtake from the 9½ Weeks soundtrack.
- "I Do What I Do" (John Taylor featuring Lisa Dalbello) - available on the 9½ Weeks soundtrack.
- "Miss Sun" (Boz Scaggs featuring Lisa Dalbello) - recorded in 1980, available on Scaggs' album "HITS"
- "Miss Sun" (TOTO featuring Lisa Dalbello) - a demo song from Toto's album "XX (1977-1997)"
- "Some Things Never Change" (Chris de Burgh featuring Lisa Dalbello) (1980) - from de Burgh's album "Eastern Wind"
- "Rules Are Made to Be Broken" (Robert Palmer featuring Lisa Dalbello)
- "What's Gone" (Kim Mitchell featuring Lisa Dalbello)
- "The Formula" (Thinkman featuring Lisa Dalbello)
- "There Shines Our Promised Land" (Thinkman featuring Lisa Dalbello)
- "Every Moment" (2011) - from The Keg commercials.
- "Lift You Up" (2011) - from The Keg commercials.
- "Something Good" (2011) - from The Keg commercials.
- "Pretty Girls (Alternate Version)" - a different, re-recorded version of Pretty Girls was released as a single in 1978.
- "Black on Black (demo)" - available on the 9½ Weeks soundtrack and as a single.
- "Baby Doll (demo)" - from the Black On Black single.
- "Lucky Day" (Heart (band) featuring Lisa Dalbello) - a demo that Lisa Dalbello recorded and released with the band Heart.
- "Blowin' in the Wind" (St. Margaret Mary Church Singers featuring Lisa Dalbello)
- "Amazing Grace" (St. Margaret Mary Church Singers featuring Lisa Dalbello)
- "Can I Do It?" (Lisa Dalbello featuring Tim Thorney)
