= Juno Awards of 1984 =

Canadian music awards ceremony

- Date: 5 December 1984
- Venue: Exhibition Place, Toronto, Ontario
- Hosted by: Joe Flaherty, Andrea Martin

Television/radio coverage
- Network: CBC

The Juno Awards of 1984, representing Canadian music industry achievements of the previous year, were awarded on 5 December 1984 in Toronto at a ceremony hosted by Joe Flaherty and Andrea Martin of SCTV at Exhibition Place Automotive Building. The ceremonies were broadcast on CBC Television from 8pm Eastern Time.

1984 was a pioneering year for music video in Canada as MuchMusic began broadcasting in September, and a new Juno award for "Best Video" was presented for the first time.

As it had been 20 months since the last Juno show, a number of new artist nominees debuted this year including Corey Hart, Honeymoon Suite, Platinum Blonde, The Parachute Club and Zappacosta.

The Juno Award itself was revised from 18-inches high to a 15-inch statuette, retaining the metronome shape.

== Awards ceremony ==
In October 1983, Juno organizers CARAS decided to move the awards date later in the year, tentatively to 3 December 1984 at Roy Thomson Hall in Toronto, Ontario. A stated reason for this move was to promote Canadian artists during the Christmas shopping season. CARAS also wanted to assume more control over the awards broadcast from the CBC. Eventually, it was determined that the CBC would continue to televise the Junos, but for 1984 would work with major music promoter Concert Productions International on the broadcast.

In August 1984, it was confirmed that the awards would take place at Exhibition Place two days later than planned. At the same time, a preliminary selection of "semi-finalist" artists and albums was also announced. The final set of nominations were determined in late October.

British-Canadian musician Bryan Adams was the heavy favorite of the evening with nominations in five categories of which he would take home four awards including "Male Vocalist of the Year" and "Album of the Year" for the hit Cuts Like a Knife album which had sold more than 3 million copies in the U.S. and over 300,000 copies in Canada. When Adams and his co-writing partner Jim Vallance won the "Composer of the Year" award, Adams excitedly accepted it on behalf of the absent Vallance: "This is the one I really wanted to win. Jim and I have been writing for six years together. Jimmy we did it! Right on!"

Performances during the show included the three "Canadian Music Hall of Fame" inductees: The Crew-Cuts, The Four Lads and The Diamonds, and also Jane Siberry.

The ratings for the television broadcast were far down from the previous year with an estimated 1,443,000 viewers.

== Nominees and winners ==
This was the last year that the "Comedy Album of the Year" was awarded.

Bryan Adams was nominated twice in the same category for "Composer of the Year" award for two different songs both from the Cuts Like a Knife album.

The Good Brothers were given their final "Country Group of the Year" award after a record eight years in a row, while Loverboy claimed the "Group of the Year" award for the third year in a row, as did Liona Boyd for the "Instrumental Artist of the Year" award.

Director Rob Quartly received four of the five nominations for the nascent "Best Video" award category, and also took the win for the "Sunglasses at Night" music video.

=== Female Vocalist of the Year ===
Winner: Carole Pope

Other nominees:

- Dalbello
- Anne Murray
- Shari Ulrich
- Holly Woods

=== Male Vocalist of the Year ===
Winner: Bryan Adams

Other nominees:

- Bruce Cockburn
- Corey Hart
- Gordon Lightfoot
- Stan Rogers

=== Most Promising Female Vocalist of the Year ===
Winner: Sherry Kean

Other nominees:

- Véronique Béliveau
- Ann Mortifee
- Jane Siberry
- Diane Tell

=== Most Promising Male Vocalist of the Year ===
Winner: Zappacosta

Other nominees:

- LaBarge
- Johnnie Lovesin
- Nash the Slash
- Tim Ryan

=== Group of the Year ===
Winner: Loverboy

Other nominees:

- Chilliwack
- Payola$
- Red Rider
- Rush

=== Most Promising Group of the Year ===
Winner: The Parachute Club

Other nominees:

- Honeymoon Suite
- Men Without Hats
- The Nylons
- Platinum Blonde

=== Composer of the Year ===
Winner: Bryan Adams and Jim Vallance, "Cuts Like a Knife" by Bryan Adams

Other nominees:

- Bryan Adams and Eric Kagna, "Straight from the Heart"
- Billy Bryans, Laurie Conger, Lynne Fernie, Lorraine Segato, "Rise Up"
- Ivan Doroschuk, "Safety Dance"
- Corey Hart, "Sunglasses at Night"

=== Country Female Vocalist of the Year ===
Winner: Anne Murray

Other nominees:

- Carroll Baker
- Marie Bottrell
- Kelita Haverland
- Susan Jacks

=== Country Male Vocalist of the Year ===
Winner: Murray McLauchlan

Other nominees:

- Terry Carisse
- Dick Damron
- Ian Tyson
- Diamond Joe White

=== Country Group or Duo of the Year ===
Winner: The Good Brothers

Other nominees:

- Family Brown
- The Mercey Brothers
- Prairie Oyster
- Chris Whiteley and Caitlin Hanford

=== Instrumental Artist of the Year ===
Winner: Liona Boyd

Other nominees:

- Canadian Brass
- Hagood Hardy
- Frank Mills
- The Spitfire Band

=== Producer of the Year ===
Winner: Bryan Adams, Cuts Like a Knife by Bryan Adams

Other nominees:

- Kerry Crawford and Jon Goldsmith, Stealing Fire by Bruce Cockburn
- Dalbello, whomanfoursays by Dalbello
- Daniel Lanois, The Parachute Club by The Parachute Club
- David Tyson, Stand Back by The Arrows

=== Recording Engineer of the Year ===
Winner: John Naslen, Stealing Fire by Bruce Cockburn

Other nominees:

- Gary Gray, Weapons by Rough Trade
- John Naslen, No Borders Here by Jane Siberry
- John Naslen, On Purpose by Tim Ryan
- Lenny De Rose, whomanfoursays by Dalbello

=== Canadian Music Hall of Fame ===
Winner: The Crewcuts, The Diamonds, The Four Lads

=== Walt Grealis Special Achievement Award ===
Winner: J. Lyman Potts

== Nominated and winning albums ==
=== Album of the Year ===
Winner: Cuts Like a Knife, Bryan Adams

Other nominees:

- Grace Under Pressure, Rush
- Hammer on a Drum, Payola$
- Keep It Up, Loverboy
- Neruda, Red Rider

=== Best Album Graphics ===
Winner: Dean Motter, Jeff Jackson and Deborah Samuel, Seamless by The Nylons

Other nominees:

- Heather Brown and Deborah Samuel, whomanfoursays by Dalbello
- Dean Motter, Visions of Our Future by The Tenants
- Dean Motter and Pat Harbron, Honeymoon Suite by Honeymoon Suite
- Bart Schoales, Stealing Fire by Bruce Cockburn

=== Best Children's Album ===
Winner: Rugrat Rock, The Rugrats

Other nominees:

- I Can Do Anything, Sphere Clown Band
- Music Builders, Music Builders
- Reflections on Crooked Walking, Ann Mortifee
- Special Delivery, Fred Penner

=== Best Classical Album of the Year ===
Winner: Brahms: Ballades Op. 10, Rhapsodies Op. 79, Glenn Gould

Other nominees:

- Andrew Davis Plays the Organ at Roy Thomson Hall, Andrew Davis
- Brass in Berlin, Canadian Brass
- Sibelius: Symphony #2, Toronto Symphony Orchestra with Andrew Davis
- Viola Nouveau, Rivka Golani-Erdesz

=== International Album of the Year ===
Winner: Synchronicity, The Police

Other nominees:

- Can't Slow Down, Lionel Richie
- Colour by Numbers, Culture Club
- Eliminator, ZZ Top
- Let's Dance, David Bowie

=== Best Jazz Album ===
Winner: All in Good Time, Rob McConnell & The Boss Brass

Other nominees:

- A New Look, Doug Hamilton and The Brass Connection
- Bye Bye Baby, Ed Bickert
- Indian Summer, Fraser MacPherson
- The Lion's Eyes, Steve Holt

=== Comedy Album of the Year ===
Winner: Strange Brew, Bob & Doug McKenzie

Other nominees:

- Air Farce Live, Royal Canadian Air Farce
- Go to Hell, Maclean and Maclean
- Laugh to Your Heart's Delight, Al Clouston

== Nominated and winning releases ==
=== Single of the Year ===
Winner: "Rise Up", The Parachute Club

Other nominees:

- "Cuts Like a Knife", Bryan Adams
- "Safety Dance", Men Without Hats
- "Straight from the Heart", Bryan Adams
- "Sunglasses at Night", Corey Hart

=== International Single of the Year ===
Winner: "Billie Jean", Michael Jackson

Other nominees:

- "Every Breath You Take", The Police
- "Islands in the Stream", Kenny Rogers and Dolly Parton
- "Let's Dance", David Bowie
- "Girls Just Want to Have Fun", Cyndi Lauper

=== Best Video ===
Winner: Rob Quartly, "Sunglasses at Night" by Corey Hart

Other nominees:

- Robert Fresco, "Rise Up" by The Parachute Club
- Rob Quartly, "Doesn't Really Matter" by Platinum Blonde
- Rob Quartly, "Standing in the Dark" by Platinum Blonde
- Rob Quartly, "I Want You Back" by Sherry Kean

== Bibliography ==
- Krewen, Nick. (2010). Music from far and wide: Celebrating 40 years of the Juno Awards. Key Porter Books Limited, Toronto. ISBN 978-1-55470-339-5
