= Which Face Should I Put On Tonight =

Single by Cassandra Vasik

from the album Wildflowers
- Released: 1992
- Genre: Country
- Length: 3:17
- Label: Epic
- Songwriters: Tim Thorney; Erica Ehm
- Producers: Erica Ehm; Peter Lee

Cassandra Vasik singles chronology
"It Comes Back to You" (1991)	"Which Face Should I Put On Tonight" (1992)	"Wildflowers" (1992)

"Which Face Should I Put On Tonight" is a song recorded by Canadian country music artist Cassandra Vasik. It was released in 1992 as the third single from her debut album, Wildflowers. It peaked at number 5 on the RPM Country Tracks chart in April 1992.

== Chart performance ==
Chart (1992)	Peak position
Canada Country Singles (RPM)	5

=== Year-end charts ===
Chart (1992)	Position
Canada Country Tracks (RPM)	50
