= Feels like Home (Cassandra Vasik album) =

Studio album by Cassandra Vasik
- Released: 1993
- Genre: Country
- Label: Epic
- Producer: Tim Thorney; Erica Ehm

Cassandra Vasik chronology
Wildflowers (1991)	Feels like Home (1993)	Different (2000)

Feels like Home is the second studio album by Canadian country music artist Cassandra Vasik. It was released by Epic Records in 1993. The album peaked at number 20 on the RPM Country Albums chart.

== Track listing ==
1. "Sadly Mistaken"
2. "Fortune Smiled on Me" (with Russell deCarle)
3. "The Man I Never Knew"
4. "Stand Your Ground"
5. "Almost Like You Cared"
6. "Lavender Hill"
7. "Afraid to Drive"
8. "She Talks"
9. "Roll Like a Wheel"
10. "As Far as the Story Goes"
11. "Sometimes a Harbour"
12. "The Parade"
13. "I Can Forgive but I Can't Forget"
14. "Let Sleeping Dogs Lie"

== Chart performance ==
Chart (1993)	Peak position
Canadian RPM Country Albums	20
