= Sadly Mistaken =

Single by Cassandra Vasik

from the album Feels Like Home
- Released: 1993
- Genre: Country
- Length: 4:02
- Label: Epic
- Songwriters: Tim Thorney; Erica Ehm
- Producers: Tim Thorney; Erica Ehm

Cassandra Vasik singles chronology
"Those Stars" (1992)	"Sadly Mistaken" (1993)	"Fortune Smiled on Me" (1993)

"Sadly Mistaken" is a song recorded by Canadian country music artist Cassandra Vasik. It was released in 1993 as the first single from her second studio album, Feels Like Home. The song peaked at number 7 on the RPM Country Tracks chart in May 1993.

== Chart performance ==
Chart (1993)	Peak position
Canada Country Singles (RPM)	7

=== Year-end charts ===
Chart (1993)	Position
Canada Country Tracks (RPM)	78
