= Wildflowers (Cassandra Vasik song) =

Single by Cassandra Vasik

from the album Wildflowers
- Released: 1992
- Genre: Country
- Length: 3:35
- Label: Epic
- Songwriters: Tim Thorney; Erica Ehm
- Producers: Erica Ehm; Peter Lee

Cassandra Vasik singles chronology
"Which Face Should I Put On Tonight" (1992)	"Wildflowers" (1992)	"Those Stars" (1992)

"Wildflowers" is a song recorded by Canadian country music artist Cassandra Vasik. It was released in 1992 as the fourth single from her debut album, Wildflowers. It peaked at number 10 on the RPM Country Tracks chart in August 1992.

== Chart performance ==
Chart (1992)	Peak position
Canada Adult Contemporary (RPM)	27
Canada Country Singles (RPM)	10
