= Wildflowers (Cassandra Vasik album) =

Studio album by Cassandra Vasik
- Released: 1991
- Genre: Country
- Label: Epic
- Producer: Erica Ehm; Peter Lee

Cassandra Vasik chronology
Wildflowers (1991)	Feels Like Home (1993)

Wildflowers is the debut album by Canadian country music artist Cassandra Vasik. It was released by Epic Records in 1991. The album includes the Top 5 single "Which Face Should I Put on Tonight."

== Track listing ==
All songs written by Tim Thorney and Erica Ehm

1. "The Black Book"
2. "Burning Witches"
3. "Which Face Should I Put On Tonight"
4. "When Will I Become a Man"
5. "It Comes Back to You"
6. "Those Stars"
7. "Fading Footsteps"
8. "Painted Cafe"
9. "Wildflowers"
10. "I Walk Alone"
11. "Innocence"
12. "Talk Around Me"
