= Roll Like a Wheel =

Single by Cassandra Vasik

from the album Feels Like Home
- Released: 1993
- Genre: Country
- Length: 2:55
- Label: Epic
- Songwriters: Tim Thorney; Erica Ehm
- Producers: Tim Thorney; Erica Ehm

Cassandra Vasik singles chronology
"Fortune Smiled on Me" (1993)	"Roll Like a Wheel" (1993)	"Almost Like You Cared" (1993)

"Roll Like a Wheel" is a song recorded by Canadian country music artist Cassandra Vasik. It was released in 1993 as the third single from her second studio album, Feels Like Home. It peaked at number 9 on the RPM Country Tracks chart in November 1993.

== Chart performance ==
Chart (1993)	Peak position
Canada Country Singles (RPM)	9

=== Year-end charts ===
Chart (1993)	Position
Canada Country Tracks (RPM)	95
