= Another Broken Heart =

Another Broken Heart

- "Another Broken Heart", song by Nudimension from The Best of Nudimension
- "Another Broken Heart", song by Los Lonely Boys Forgiven (album), 2008
- "Another Broken Heart", song by Esera Tuaolo
- "Another Broken Heart", song by O'Chi Brown from Learning to Live (Without Your Love), 1986
- "Another Broken Heart", song by Graham Nash from This Path Tonight, 2016
- "Another Broken Heart", song by Tove Styrke from Hard, 2022
