= Nudimension =

- Origin: Montréal, Quebec, Canada
- Genres: Synthpop, new wave
- Years active: 1982–1989
- Labels: Musi-Video Records, illusion (Canada), Saisons (Canada)
- Past members: Louie Louie; Marc Fontaine; Anne-Marie Cyr

Nudimension were a francophone French Canadian new wave/synthpop band from Montréal, Canada who were active between 1982 and 1989. The band were composed of lead singer/composer Louie Louie (real name Louis Rondeau), non musician and producer Marc Fontaine and–for a period–vocalist Anne Marie Cyr. They are best known for their 1983 single "Amour Programmé".

The band achieved moderate success in the French-speaking regions of Canada and Europe releasing 5 singles and achieving regular radio play. The band also appeared on a number of North American television stations during the early 1980s at the genesis of synthpop and music video.

Principally recording in their native French language, they achieved crossover success in Anglophone Canada and Europe often recording English versions of their original songs.

Although they ceased recording in the early 1990s, an album of greatest hits was released retrospectively in 2009 on the Musi-Video label.

== History ==
Louis Rondeau (known by his stage name "Louie Louie") was originally a drummer and vocalist in 1970s punk band The 222s. In early 1981, the 222s were wound up by the original members. Rondeau states that as a result of that, he wanted to "explore new dimensions in music, and (the emerging genre of) electro would allow him to do that". He teamed up with the 222s assistant manager Marc Fontaine and on 16 June 1982, formed the studio group Nudimension, taking the band's name from his original music concept.

Fontaine's father was owner of the Studio Fontaine in Montreal (today known as Lamajeure); therefore access to professional recording equipment was easy for them.Together as Nudimension, Rondeau and Fontaine released a number of francophone singles and made regular appearances on the late night (and sometimes risqué) Montreal television show Musi-Video in 1982. It was during recording for the Musi-Video show that they met television presenter Anne Marie Cyr.

Cyr would then become their most prominent female vocalist, appearing on a number of their singles; although a regular contributor, she was never a full member of the band. The release of the single "Amour Programmé" became their breakthrough single, becoming their biggest hit charting in the top 20 in the francophone Canadian charts and also achieving their first sales in Europe. It enabled them to graduate from the late night Musi-Video show to primetime television. In late 1983, Rondeau and Cyr played the track to open Canada's Quebec based television Saturday night Donald Lautrec Show. While it was also featured on heavy rotation on French radio stations in Canada. The follow-up single "Obsession" likewise did well, although "Planête Sauvage" (English): "Wild Planet") and "Big Boy" failed to equal that success.

A marketing advantage that Nudimension had at the time, was that Fontaine had previously studied film in Los Angeles and would produce the band's own rudimentary music videos. His role in the band was similar to that of the Human League's Philip Adrian Wright being largely visual and not musical. In 1983, in the infancy of music television, having a music video to accompany a release was unusual for all but the biggest bands with major label funding and helped Nudimension acquire prominence.

Cyr stopped working with the band after 1985, Patrick Bourgeois went on to form Les BBs in Montreal but Rondeau and Fontaine continued into the early 1990s. The start of the end for Nudimension was when their business manager Ben Kaye left to work with (then) emerging French Canadian singer Celine Dion. Despite the release of the single "I Need Your Loving" (which did not chart) in 1989, Rondeau felt there was a certain breakdown of inspiration, frustration and professional stagnation. Although not a formal split, Nudimension did not continue after 1990.

== Revival ==
Some 20 years after the band's disbandment, and with the synthpop genre receiving a general revival, emboldened an interest in the band's back catalogue. Fontaine started an official YouTube channel to show the band's old music videos. It was easier to obtain from the various television stations and publish the music video clips of performances that the band produced in the early 1980s, than to publish recorded music as at the time the whereabouts of master tapes from the long defunct record labels were not known.

However, in 2009, Fontaine tracked them down and produced The Best of Nudimension as a greatest hits album. It was the band's first album, released 26 years after their first single.

Also in 2009, Fontaine and Rondeau were interviewed on QBR about the band's history.

== Personnel ==
- Louie Louie (Louis Rondeau) – lead vocals, keyboards, drums
- Marc Fontaine
- Anne Marie Cyr – vocals

=== Additional musicians ===
- Francois Laberge - keyboards
- Patrick Bourgeois - electric guitar (later of Les B.B.)
- Laurie Ann Gill - vocals
- Marla – vocals

== Discography ==
=== Albums ===
- The Best of Nudimension (2009) (Musi-Video Records)

=== Singles ===
- "Amour Programmé" (1983) (Illusion Records (Canada)
- "Obsession" (1983) (Saisons)
- "Big Boy" (1984) (Saisons)
- "Planête Sauvage" (1986)

== See also ==
- The 222s
- Les B.B (French wiki) (in French)
