= Amour Programmé =

Single by Nudimension

from the album The Best of Nudimension
- B-side: "Extended Instrumental"
- Released: May 1983
- Studio: Fountain, Montreal, Quebec, Canada
- Genre: Synthpop
- Length: 4:10
- Label: Illusion Records (Canada)
- Songwriter(s): Fontaine, Rondeau
- Producer(s): Francois Matte

Nudimension singles chronology
"Amour Programmé" (1983)	"Obsession" (1984)

"Amour Programmé" is a song by the French Canadian synthpop group Nudimension.

The single is in the French language and was recorded at Fountain Studios, Montreal, Quebec, Canada. Released by Illusion Records (Canada) in May 1983, it became a breakthrough single for Nudimension and was the first to feature TV presenter Anne-Marie Cyr on vocals. It achieved moderate success in French-speaking regions of Canada, charting in the top 20 francophone charts and in Europe. It was responsible for a number of Nudimension's early TV performances including Quebec TV’s prime-time Lautrec Show.

It was also released with a music video created by the band's Marc Fontaine, which was unusual for all but the biggest bands in 1983. The video featured footage shot during one of the band's appearances on Montreal's Musi-Video show and scenes of Louie Louie and Cyr in the studio with basic chromakey overlay effects.

In 2009, two versions of the song were featured on the band's remastered album The Best of Nudimension.

== Credits ==
- Anne-Marie Cyr - Vocals
- Louie Louie - Vocals, Drums, Keyboards
- Patrick Bourgeois - Electric Guitar
- Francois Laberge - Keyboards
- Ben Kaye - Producer
