= Ron Cahute =

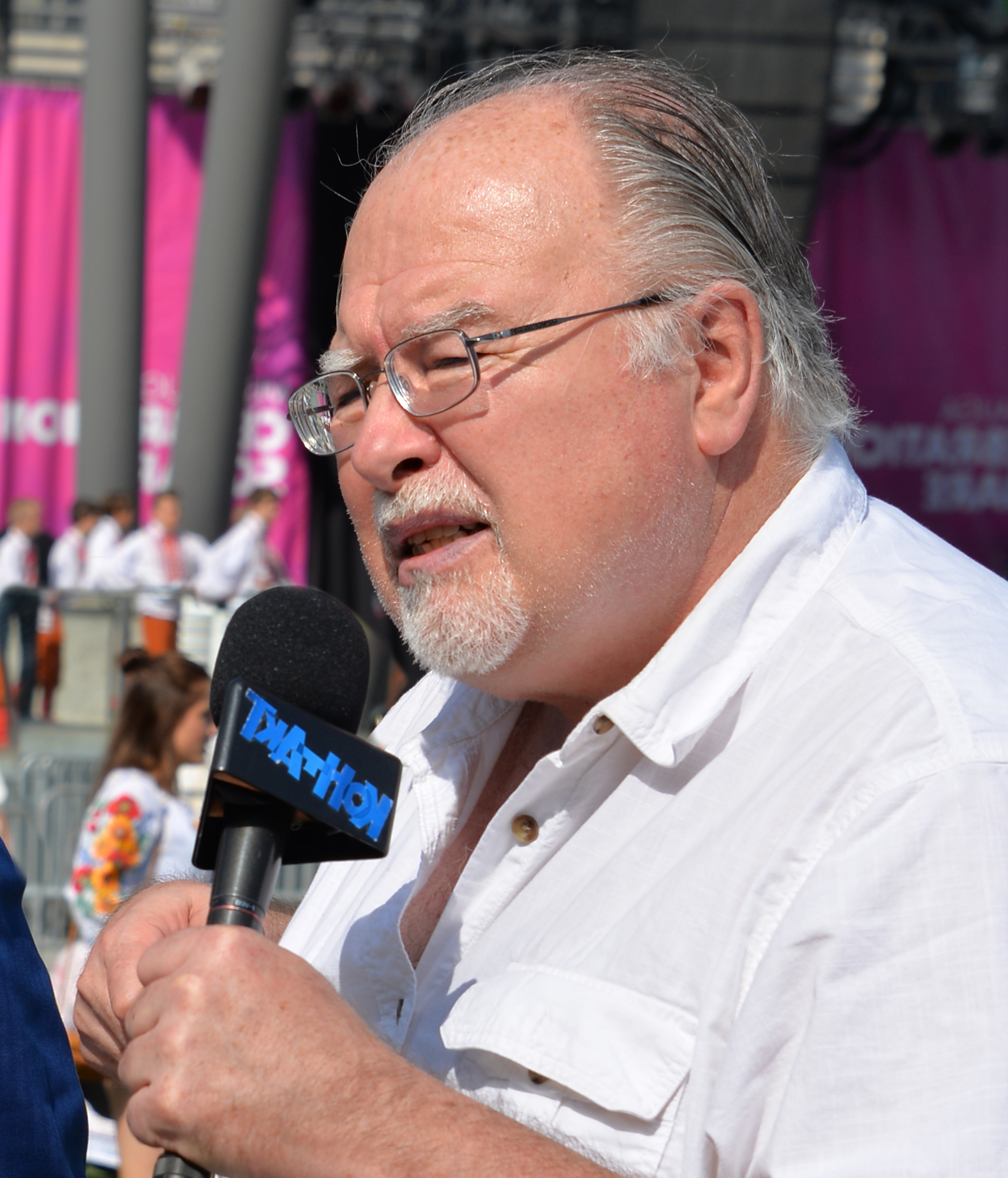

Background information
- Born: March 26, 1955; Toronto, Canada
- Died: April 22, 2023 (aged 68) Toronto, Canada
- Genre: Folk
- Occupations: Singer, musician, songwriter
- Instrument: Accordion
- Formerly of: Burya
- Spouse: Christine Binka (Kowal) Cahute married 2011 - present

Ronald Cahute (Ukrainian: Рoман Кoгут; March 26, 1955 – April 22, 2023) was a Canadian recording artist and songwriter. He was an accordion player and founding member of the Ukrainian-Canadian music band Burya (Ukrainian: Буря) (English translation: Storm). He was an arranger, sound engineer, music producer, and musical director for Ukrainian dance ensembles in Toronto.

Cahute began his music career in 1962 as a drummer in the band of his late father Maurice Cahute. In 1969, he founded a Ukrainian-Canadian music band, which was later called Burya.

Cahute released over 30 albums either with Burya or as a solo artist. As a guest performer with other music artists he has performed on 178 albums. Cahute performed with Nana Mouskouri, Sofia Rotaru, Lisa Dalbello, Melissa Manchester, and Catherine McKinnon. Cahute died in Toronto on April 22, 2023, at the age of 68.

== Burya musicians ==
In its 30+ year history the line-up of Burya musicians has included:

- Ron Cahute: Accordion, Lead Vocals
- Jaroslaw Hryhorsky: Violin, Viola, Trombone, Vocals, Percussion
- Len Steciuk: Guitar, Fiddle, Vocals
- Steve Krachko: Drums
- Bill Hawryschuk: Drums
- David Monis: Drums
- Mark Zubek: Drums
- Michael Monis: Guitar
- Michael Romanick: Tenor Saxophone, Clarinet, Percussion
- Tom Romanick: Saxophone
- Ron Lutz: Alto & Tenor Saxophone, Percussion
- Frank Uhran: Tenor Saxophone, Clarinet, Percussion
- John Lockwood: Flute

== Albums ==
=== Ron Cahute albums ===
- Хpиcтoc Paждaєтьcя (1988)
- Ultimate Polka (1989)
- Accordion Music - The Ron Cahute Collection
- Українські Народні Танці (Traditional Ukrainian Folk Dance) (1993)
- Canada's Ukrainian Festival (1997)
- Ron Cahute Generic Volume 1 (1987)
- Ron Cahute Generic Volume 2 (1989)

=== Ron Cahute & Burya albums ===
- Sharavarshchyna (2015)
- iKozak (2010)

=== Burya albums ===
- Burya I (1979)
- Burya II (1982)
- Burya IIi (1984)
- Burya Live in Toronto (1985)
- Burya V
- Burya Non-Stop Dancing
- Burya Set in Stone
- Burya Live in Edmonton
- Burya Australia Tour (2004)
- Best of Burya
- Burya Now and Then (Double Album)

=== Recording guest appearances ===
- Played accordion on "Tango", Lisa Dalbello's "She" album
- Arranged, played keyboards, and co-produced "Paзoм - Visions" (1988)
- Played accordion on "Sailor Song" by Sarah Lentz
- Played accordion on "Heartbroken" by Keisha Prince
- Played accordion on "Amsterdam" by Steve Wildesmith
- Arranged, played all instruments, and co-produced "Bread for my brother" by Oksana
- Arranged, played all instruments, and produced "Nostalgie Di Tutti I Tempi" by Vince Paparo
- Arranged, played accordion, percussion, recorded and co-produced "Blossoming" by Voloshky (1996)
- Arranged, played accordion, recorded and co-produced "Fantazia" by Voloshky (1999)

=== Ukrainian comedy albums ===
Ron Cahute has recorded Ukrainian comedy albums with Ihor Baczynskyj including:

- ...And the Garden Goes Here! (1997)

=== Children's Educational Albums ===
Ron Cahute has recorded a series of children's educational albums with Jane Lapko and Ihor Baczynskyj including:

- Barabolya (1997)
- Tsyboolya (1998)
- Booryak and Carrots Too (1999)
- Borscht (1999)
- Poutine - French children's album (1999)
- Barabolya High (2000)
- Crepe Suzette- French children's album
