= Obsession (Nudimension song) =

Single by Nudimension
- B-side: "Instrumental"
- Released: May 1984
- Recorded: Fountain Studios, Montreal, Quebec, Canada
- Genre: Synthpop, new wave
- Length: 4:00
- Label: Saison (Canada)
- Songwriter(s): Louie Rondeau
- Producer(s): Ben Kaye

Nudimension singles chronology
"Amour Programmé" (1983)	"Obsession" (1984)	"Planète Sauvage" (1985)

"Obsession" is a song by the French Canadian synthpop group Nudimension.

The single is in the French language (With the exception of a single English refrain from Anne Marie Cyr) and was recorded at Fountain Studios, Montreal, Quebec, Canada. Released by Saison Records (Canada) in May 1984, it became the second single for Nudimension and like most singles featured [part-time TV presenter Cyr on vocals. It would achieve moderate success in French speaking regions of Canada, charting in the top 20 francophone Québécoise charts, and in Europe.

After the single charted, an English-language version (now renamed "Rendez-Vous") was recorded. The English-language version of the song was not released as a single, however in 2009 it was featured on the band's remastered album The Best of Nudimension.

== Credits ==
- Anne-Marie Cyr - vocals
- Louie Louie - vocals, drums, keyboards
- Marc Fontaine - keyboards
