= Live at Rockpalast (Dalbello album) =

Live At Rockpalast

Video by Dalbello
- Released: 15 June 2015
- Recorded: 1 October 1985
- Genre: Alternative rock
- Label: Repertoire

Dalbello chronology
whore (1996)	Live At Rockpalast (2015)

Live At Rockpalast is the first DVD/CD compilation from Canadian singer Dalbello, showcasing her performance at Rockpalast Bochum, Germany, on 1 October 1985. The physical release was originally slated for release on 15 June 2015, with an MP3 release on 5 June 2015, but was pushed back to 29 June 2015. This release is the first time the performance has ever been commercially available, and features restored concert footage and remastered audio. In addition, it is also the first ever commercial Dalbello release since her latest album, whore, released in 1996.

== Track listing ==
No.	Title	Lyrics	Length
1.	"Cardinal Sin"	Lisa Dalbello	4:44
2.	"Devious Nature"	Lisa Dalbello	4:07
3.	"Path of Least Resistance"	Lisa Dalbello	5:14
4.	"Baby Doll"	Lisa Dalbello	5:00
5.	"Wait for an Answer"	Lisa Dalbello	7:36
6.	"Animal"	Lisa Dalbello	5:39
7.	"Guilty by Association"	Lisa Dalbello	4:25
8.	"She Pretends"	Lisa Dalbello	5:41
9.	"Gonna Get Close to You"	Lisa Dalbello	4:57
10.	"Black on Black"	Lisa Dalbello	5:30
11.	"Animal (Reprise)"	Lisa Dalbello	6:53

== Personnel ==
- Lisa Dal Bello : Vocals
- Rob Yale : Keyboards, Fairlight CMI
- Asher Horowitz : Guitar
- Steve Webster : Bass
- Kevin McKenzie : Drums
