= The Best of Nudimension =

Greatest hits album by Nudimension
- Released: July 1, 2009
- Recorded: 1983–1990
- Genre: Synthpop
- Label: Musi-Video Records (Canada)
- Producer: Marc Fontaine

The Best of Nudimension is a greatest hits album by 1980s French Canadian synthpop group Nudimension. It includes the majority of their tracks recorded between 1981 and 1989. Songs are in French and English including the singles "Amour Programmé" and "Rendez-vous" (the anglophone version of original release "Obsession"). Nudimension stopped recording around 1991. The Best of is a re-master and re-release by Musi-Video Records (Canada) in July 2009, produced by original band member Marc Fontaine.

== Track listing ==
The track list on the original album:

1. "Amour Programmé" (Fontaine, Rondeau) – 4:11 ^{<Note 1>}
2. "Another Broken Heart" – 4:04
3. "Automatique" – 3:56
4. "Big Boy" – 3:40
5. "Femme En Amour" – 4:28
6. "Hors La Loi" (Louie Louie version) – 4:17
7. "Hors La Loi (Anne-Marie Cyr version) – 3:47
8. "Hot Pursuit (instrumental" – 2:50
9. "Mondo Erotico (instrumental)" – 5:01
10. "Model Blues (instrumental" – 4:06
11. "Nudimension Theme Song" – 3:11
12. "I Need Your Loving" – 6:59
13. "Planête Sauvage" – 3:40
14. "Petite Fille" – 4:59
15. "Reminiscing" – 3:01
16. "Rendez-vous" – 3:41
17. "Save a Little Love" – 4:18
18. "Amour Programmé (instrumental)" – 6:05
19. "Femme En Amour (instrumental)" – 4:59
20. "I Need Your Loving (instrumental" – 8:22

^{<Note 1> Released as a single 1983}

== Personnel ==
- Patrick Bourgeois – Electric Guitar
- Anne-Marie Cyr: Vocals
- Francois Laberge: Synthesizer
- Laurie Ann Gill – Vocals
- Louie Louie (real name Louis Rondeau): Vocals, Drums, Keyboards
- Marla – Vocals
