= She (Dalbello album) =

she

Studio album by Dalbello
- Released: 1987
- Studio: Phase One (Toronto)
- Genres: Alternative rock; synth-pop
- Length: 41:48
- Label: EMI
- Producer: Dalbello

Dalbello chronology
| whomanfoursays (1984) | she (1987) | whore (1996) |

Singles from she
- 1. "Black on Black" Released: 1985; 2. "Tango" Released: 1987; 3. "Talk to Me" Released: 1987; 4. "Immaculate Eyes" Released: 1987

she is the fifth studio album by Canadian singer Dalbello, released in 1987 by EMI. The album included her biggest Canadian chart hits, "Tango" and "Black on Black".

"Black on Black" appeared in a different form on the soundtrack of the film 9½ Weeks (1986).

"Black on Black" starts with a looped sample from Gregorio Allegri's work Miserere mei, Deus.

Heart recorded a cover version of sorts with "Black on Black II" which became the most noteworthy version of the song as a Top 5 Billboard Rock Chart hit on their eleventh studio album Desire Walks On (1993). The Heart version is similar in structure but in a more heavy metal style and some minor changes to verses. On this version Dalbello provided backing vocals and shared writing credit with the Wilson sisters.

David Gilmour of Pink Floyd guests on guitar on the last song of the album, "Immaculate Eyes".

== Track listing ==
All tracks are written by Lisa Dalbello, except where noted.

Side one
| No. | Title | Length |
|---|---|---|
| 1. | "Black on Black" | 4:23 |
| 2. | "Baby Doll" | 4:01 |
| 3. | "Talk to Me" | 3:56 |
| 4. | "Danger Danger" | 4:33 |
| 5. | "Intimate Secrets" | 3:29 |

Side two
| No. | Title | Lyrics | Length |
|---|---|---|---|
| 6. | "Tango" | | 4:05 |
| 7. | "Body and Soul" | Lisa Dalbello; Asher Horowitz | 4:16 |
| 8. | "Imagination" | | 3:28 |
| 9. | "Why Stand Alone" | | 4:04 |
| 10. | "Immaculate Eyes" | | 4:35 |
| Total length: | | | 41:48 |

== Personnel ==
Musicians

- Dalbello — vocals, keyboards, Hammond B-3 organ, bass, drums, backing vocals
- Scott Humphrey — keyboards, Fairlight CMI, bass, drums, PPG Wave/HDD
- Lou Pomanti — keyboards
- Ron Cahute — accordion
- Asher Horowitz — guitar
- Kevin Breit — guitar
- David Gilmour — guitar on "Immaculate Eyes"
- Fergus Jemison Marsh — Chapman stick
- Steve Webster — bass
- Bernard Edwards — bass on "Tango"
- Eddie Zeeman — drums
- Kevin McKenzie — drums
- Steve Kendry — drums
- Anita Rossi — backing vocals

Technical

- Lenny Derose — engineer, recording, mixing
- Richard Haughton — photography
