= Will You Be There (In the Morning) =

1993 single by Heart

Single by Heart

from the album Desire Walks On
- B-side: "Risin' Suspicion"
- Released: November 8, 1993
- Genre: Rock
- Length: 4:27
- Label: Capitol
- Songwriter: Robert John "Mutt" Lange
- Producers: Duane Baron; John Purdell

Heart singles chronology
"Black on Black II" (1993)	"Will You Be There (In the Morning)" (1993)	"The Woman in Me" (1994)

"Will You Be There (In the Morning)" is a song by American rock band Heart. The ballad was written by veteran songwriter and producer Robert John "Mutt" Lange, who was responsible for writing Heart's "All I Wanna Do Is Make Love to You" in 1990, and was released as the first single from the band's 11th studio album, Desire Walks On (1993) (although "Black on Black II" was released to radio first). Unlike the majority of Heart songs, which feature Ann Wilson on lead vocals, the lead singer on the song is Nancy Wilson. The song was released in the United Kingdom in November 1993 and in the United States the following month by Capitol Records.

"Will You Be There" peaked at number 39 on the US Billboard Hot 100 and number 41 on the US Cash Box Top 100. It also peaked at number 19 on the UK Singles Chart and number eight in Canada. It additionally charted within the top 40 in Australia, Iceland, and New Zealand.

== Track listings ==
- US cassette single; European CD single; Japanese mini-CD single
1. "Will You Be There (In the Morning)" – 4:27
2. "Risin' Suspicion" – 3:04
- UK 7-inch picture disc and cassette single
1. "Will You Be There (In the Morning)"
2. "These Dreams" (live)
- UK CD1
1. "Will You Be There (In the Morning)" – 4:27
2. "What About Love" – 3:41
3. "Risin' Suspicion" – 3:04
4. "Who Will You Run To" – 4:01
- UK CD2
1. "Will You Be There (In the Morning)" – 4:27
2. "Love Hurts" – 4:34
3. "These Dreams" (live) – 4:22
4. "All I Wanna Do Is Make Love to You" – 4:29
- Australian CD single
1. "Will You Be There (In the Morning)"
2. "Risin' Suspicion"
3. "Love Hurts"
4. "These Dreams"

== Charts ==
=== Weekly charts ===
Chart (1993–1994)	Peak position
Australia (ARIA)	24
Canada Top Singles (RPM)	8
Canada Adult Contemporary (RPM)	20
Europe (Eurochart Hot 100)	33
Europe (European Hit Radio)	20
Germany (GfK)	65
Iceland (Íslenski Listinn Topp 40)	38
New Zealand (Recorded Music NZ)	14
UK Singles (Official Charts)	19
UK Airplay (Music Week)	18
US Billboard Hot 100	39
US Adult Contemporary (Billboard)	15
US Pop Airplay (Billboard)	25
US Cash Box Top 100	41

=== Year-end charts ===
Chart (1994)	Position
Australia (ARIA)	98
Canada Top Singles (RPM)	58
US Adult Contemporary (Billboard)	43

== Release history ==
Region	Date	Format(s)	Label(s)	Ref.
United Kingdom	November 8, 1993	7-inch vinyl; CD; cassette	Capitol	
Japan	November 17, 1993	Mini-CD	Capitol	
Australia	December 6, 1993	Cassette	Capitol	
United States	December 6, 1993	CD; cassette	Capitol	
