= Whore (album) =

Studio album by Lisa Dalbello
- Released: July 22, 1996 (Holland); August 24, 1996 (Canada)
- Recorded: 1995 at Phase One Studios, Toronto; A&M Studios, Los Angeles (track 10); The Clubhouse, Burbank (tracks 8 & 9)
- Genres: Alternative rock, alternative metal, gothic rock, funk
- Length: 46:59
- Labels: EMI, Spin Records
- Producers: Lisa Dalbello, Richard G. Benoit

Lisa Dalbello chronology
She (1987)	Whore (1996)	"Live At Rockpalast" (2015)

Professional ratings
Review scores
Source	Rating

Whore is the sixth studio album by Canadian singer Dalbello, released in 1996. It is a concept album and is notable for her direction change from electronic rock (she) to a more avantgarde soundscape, mixing alternative rock with hard rock, metal, gothic rock and funk influences. The song "Eleven" was chosen as the album's lead single, and a promotional video was released. All songs from the album were written by Lisa Dalbello and her brother Stefano Dalbello, except for track 6, written by Stefano Dalbello and his wife Dani Elwell. Critically acclaimed, the album's singles received moderate airplay in Canada.

Lisa Dalbello says about the album:

Before I even began recording this album, I had written a poem called whore, which evolved into the pivotal song that became the foundation for the album [...] the song whore is about the loss of self; and about the loss of self-esteem. It's about trading in your values [...] selling out [...] in exchange for some kind of gain [...] whatever that may be--whether it's to be loved, to be accepted, to fit in, to climb a ladder of success [...] but ultimately, it's about power and powerlessness: The moment you place your self-worth into the hands of others, you devalue yourself [...] you prostitute yourself.

== Track listing ==
No.	Title	Lyrics	Length
1.	"Heavy Boots"	Lisa Dalbello, Stefano Dalbello	4:31
2.	"Easy"	Lisa Dalbello, Stefano Dalbello	4:13
3.	"Whore"	Lisa Dalbello, Stefano Dalbello	4:16
4.	"eLeVeN"	Lisa Dalbello, Stefano Dalbello	4:52
5.	"Falling Down"	Lisa Dalbello, Stefano Dalbello	4:18
6.	"O Lil' Boy"	Stefano Dalbello, Dani Elwell	4:10
7.	"Deep Dark Hole"	Lisa Dalbello, Stefano Dalbello	4:35
8.	"Yippie"	Lisa Dalbello, Stefano Dalbello	4:31
9.	"All That I Want"	Lisa Dalbello, Stefano Dalbello	5:01
10.	"Revenge of Sleeping Beauty"	Lisa Dalbello, Stefano Dalbello	6:32

== Singles ==
Released only in Europe and Canada as promotional singles:

- eLeVeN
1. eLeVen - 4:53
2. whore - 4:22
3. whore (Alternate Version) - 4:41
- Heavy Boots
1. Heavy Boots (Clawfinger Mix 1) - 4:08
2. Heavy Boots (Clawfinger Mix 2) - 4:30
3. Heavy Boots (Album Version) - 4:31
- O Lil' Boy
1. O Lil' Boy (Uncle Moon's Big Boy Mix) - 7:09
2. O Lil' Boy (Uncle Moon's Long Big Boy Mix) - 4:00
3. O Lil' Boy (Album Version) - 4:10

== Additional tracks from recording session ==
- "Start Today" from Alex Lifeson's album Victor. Dalbello provides the lead vocals on the track.

== Personnel ==
- Dalbello - Vocals, Keyboards, Bass, Guitars
- Alain Johannes, Justin Clayton, Tim Welch, Kevin Breit - Guitars
- Richard Benoit - Bass, Fuzz Bass
- Ric Markmann, Steve Webster - Bass
- Ricky Lazar - Dumbec
- Stefano Dalbello - Clavinet, Percussion, Guitars
- Randy Cooke, Tommy Lee - Drums
- Gord Prior - Jew's Harp, Backing Vocals
- Floria Sigismondi - Photography

== In other media ==
- Lyrics quoted and album abundantly praised in Le Théâtre des Opérations by Maurice Dantec.
