= Alex J. Robinson =

- Born: May 9, 1985 (age 40); Sudbury, Ontario, Canada
- Genres: Country
- Occupation: Singer
- Instrument: Vocals
- Years active: 2008–2010
- Labels: Thorniac
- Website: www.alexjrobinson.com

Alex J. Robinson (born May 9, 1985) is a female country music singer/songwriter.

== History ==
In 2008, Alex J. Robinson issued her debut album, Never Say Never. The album contained her debut single, "Breakin' on the Love Thing", which peaked at No. 21 on the Radio and Records Canadian country chart. Her second album, The Getaway, was released in 2010. Both albums were released on Thorniac Records, a label co-owned by Robinson's partner, Tim Thorney.

In 2008, Robinson was nominated for the Canadian Country Music Awards' best new female artist but lost to Jessie Farrell.

Robinson was also featured in an Ontario Tourism commercial, performing "There's No Place Like This."

== Discography ==
=== Albums ===
Title	Details
Never Say Never	Release date: March 25, 2008; Label: Thorniac Records
The Getaway	Release date: February 16, 2010; Label: Thorniac Records

=== Singles ===
Year	Single	Album
2008	"Breakin' on the Love Thing"	Never Say Never
2008	"That's Who I Am"	Never Say Never
2008	"Don't Waste My Time"	Never Say Never
2009	"The Other Woman"	Never Say Never
2009	"Possibilities"	The Getaway
2010	"Into the Sun"	The Getaway
2010	"Mindemoya"	The Getaway
2010	"Girly Girl"	The Getaway

=== Music videos ===
Year	Video	Director
2008	"That's Who I Am"	Chris Stacy
2008	"Don't Waste My Time"	Blake Van Der Graff
2009	"The Other Woman"	Alex Colthart
2010	"Girly Girl"	Chris Stacy

== Awards and nominations ==
Year	Association	Category	Result
2008	Canadian Country Music Association	Top New Talent of the Year – Female	Nominated
