= No Rest for the Wicked (Helix album) =

Studio album by Helix
- Released: March 11, 1983
- Studio: Phase One (Toronto)
- Genres: Hard rock; heavy metal; glam metal
- Length: 33:02
- Label: Capitol
- Producers: Tom Treumuth, Helix and William Seip

Helix chronology
White Lace & Black Leather (1981)	No Rest for the Wicked (1983)	Walkin' the Razor's Edge (1984)

Singles from No Rest for the Wicked
- 1. "Heavy Metal Love" Released: 1983; 2. "Does a Fool Ever Learn" Released: 1983; 3. "Don't Get Mad Get Even" Released: 1983; 4. "Never Want to Lose You" Released: 1983

Professional ratings
Review scores
Source	Rating
AllMusic	3/5 stars

No Rest for the Wicked is the third studio album by the Canadian hard rock/heavy metal band Helix. It is also their major label debut, on Capitol Records.

The tracks "Heavy Metal Love" and "Never Want to Lose You" were released as singles with accompanying music videos. American actress Sandahl Bergman was featured in the music video for "Heavy Metal Love".

== Track list ==
All songs written by Helix except where noted

1. "Does a Fool Ever Learn" (3:28) (Eddie Schwartz)
2. "Let's All Do It Tonight" (2:50)
3. "Heavy Metal Love" (2:59)
4. "Check Out the Love" (3:08)
5. "No Rest for the Wicked" (3:12)
6. "Don't Get Mad Get Even" (3:21) (Lisa Dalbello, Tim Thorney)
7. "Ain't No High Like Rock 'n Roll" (3:50)
8. "Dirty Dog" (3:32)
9. "Never Want to Lose You" (3:09)
10. "White Lace and Black Leather" (3:40)

== Personnel ==
Helix

- Brian Vollmer – lead vocals
- Paul Hackman – guitars, backing vocals
- Brent Doerner – guitars, backing vocals
- Mike Uzelac – bass, backing vocals
- Greg "Fritz" Hinz – drums

Additional musicians

- Tony Moretto
- Bill Wade

Production

- Produced by Tom Treumuth for H&S Productions. Co-Produced by Helix and William Seip.
- Mixed by Tony Bongiovi at Power Station Studios
- Mastered by Bob Ludwig at Masterdisc, New York
- William Seip – manager
- Heather Brown – artwork, cover concept

== Singles ==
- "Heavy Metal Love"
- "Does a Fool Ever Learn"
- "Don't Get Mad Get Even"
- "Never Want to Lose You"

== Charts ==
Chart (1983)	Peak position
US Billboard 200	186

== Certifications ==
Region	Certification	Certified units/sales
Canada (Music Canada)	Gold	50,000^{^}
^{^} Shipments figures based on certification alone.
