= Dalbello =

Canadian musician

- Born: Lisa Concetta Dal Bello; May 22, 1959 (age 67); Weston, Ontario, Canada
- Genres: Early years: Pop; soul; funk; pop rock; Later years: Rock; alternative rock; heavy metal; progressive rock; art pop
- Occupations: Singer; songwriter; record producer
- Instruments: Guitar; piano; keyboards; drums; clavinet; bass; keytar; vocals
- Years active: 1977–present
- Labels: MCA; Talisman; Capitol; EMI; Spin

Lisa Concetta Dal Bello (born 22 May 1959), also known as Dalbello, is a Canadian singer-songwriter. She released three albums in the pop and pop/rock genre in her late teens, from 1977 through 1981 under her full name. In 1984, she re-emerged as Dalbello, with an edgier brand of alternative rock.

== Early life ==
Lisa Concetta Dal Bello was born on May 22, 1959, to Italian and British parents She grew up in Weston, Toronto, Ontario, and then with her family moved to Vaughan, Ontario. At age 11, she began playing guitar and writing her own songs, performing at the Mariposa Folk Festival and the Fiddlers' Green club in Toronto. The first song she wrote was reportedly a protest song called "Oh, Why?"

Lying about her age, at 13 she joined a government-sponsored educational music program, Summer Sounds '71, which auditioned students at various southern Ontario middle and high schools, with the objective of selecting 30 singers, songwriters, musicians and performers who would receive the opportunity to spend the first month north of the city of Toronto at a summer camp. The students would collaborate creatively, forming small music groups and bands for which they rehearsed and built a full show that toured and performed at various events throughout Ontario for the second month.

== Recording career ==
In her early teens Dalbello was featured on a record by St. Margaret Mary Church Singers, where she performed two covers of songs: "Blowin' in the Wind" and "Amazing Grace".

At the age of 14, Dalbello made her 1974 recording debut with a 4-song EP that was recorded for CBC Radio, Canada's national broadcaster. The record was produced by Jack Budgell. The EP featured four songs written and composed by Dalbello: "Mourning In The Morning", "The Old Man", "Come Sun Days" and "Human".

In 1975 Dalbello was featured on a Christmas compilation by CBC Radio, in which she performs the traditional Christmas carols "Deck The Halls" and "O Come All Ye Faithful" and a medley together with Dianne Brooks and Roy Kenner. These records were not commercially available, and airplay was legally restricted to the CBC only.

Signing with MCA Records out of L.A. when she was 17, Dalbello's self-titled debut album in 1977 was produced by David Foster and featured the then-unknown Toto members Mike Porcaro, Jeff Porcaro, Steve Lukather, David Paich and David Hungate. She also collaborated with Jay Graydon, who is featured on guitar. The album won a 1978 Juno Award for Most Promising Female Vocalist of the Year. Despite her win, however, MCA dropped her from the label because the album's production had been too expensive. During these sessions Dal Bello recorded a song for Jay Graydon called "You're My Day". Written by Graydon and Harry Garfield, the song is not featured on the album. The song was later released on a 2006 compilation album by Graydon, titled "Past To Present - The 70s". Mike Porcaro played bass on her next album Pretty Girls released independently via Talisman Records. Pretty Girls received her second Juno nomination in 1979 in the category of Female Vocalist of the Year. The album was later reissued by Capitol Records. Later in 1979, Melissa Manchester covered the song "Pretty Girls"; released as a single, the track hit the US top 40. This marked Dal Bello's first international success as a songwriter.

Dalbello, signed to Capitol Records and released her third album Drastic Measures in 1981. Dalbello collaborated with Bryan Adams and Tim Thorney on the album. In 1982, she sang the theme tune for the ABC TV film The Sins of Dorian Gray.

After Drastic Measures, she took a break from recording to re-evaluate her creative and personal priorities and to work on her poetry. Dalbello received a Juno nomination in 1980 for Female Vocalist of The Year and in 1983 was again nominated for Female Vocalist of the Year. She told Billboard, "I felt there was no point in making records if I hadn't found a sense of how I fitted in musically, and how to express myself. I hadn't yet learned how to convey my musical ideas to the people I was working with." During this time, David Bowie's former Ziggy Stardust guitarist Mick Ronson saw her in a CBC Television documentary on Canadian music while working at Phase One recording studio in Toronto and convinced her to record another album.

That album, whomanfoursays (a homophone for "human forces"), was co-produced by Dalbello and Ronson. It was also her first album recorded as Dalbello, and marked her transformation into an edgy rock artist. The transformation worked – the album was even more successful on the Canadian pop charts than her earlier albums had been. The album spawned the hit singles "Gonna Get Close to You", later covered by Queensrÿche, and "Animal", which was covered by Heavens Gate. whomanfoursays garnered four Juno nominations: two for Dalbello herself as Producer of the Year and Female Vocalist of the Year, one for Lenny De Rose for Recording Engineer of the Year and one for art director Heather Brown and photographer Deborah Samuels for Best Album Graphic.

In 1985, Dalbello was nominated for a seventh Juno in the category of Female Vocalist of the Year.

In 1986, Dalbello wrote and recorded the songs "Black on Black" and "I Do What I Do" for the 9½ Weeks soundtrack. Although included in the film, Dalbello's recording of "I Do What I Do" was not on the soundtrack album, which instead featured a recording by John Taylor of Duran Duran; her recording of "Black on Black" did, however, appear in both the film and the soundtrack album. Dalbello also worked with other artists including Duran Duran's John Taylor, Heart, the band Nena, Glass Tiger and their producer Jim Vallance.

Ronson and Dalbello planned to record a second album, however, Ronson was passed over by both her record label and her manager at that time, Roger Davies, over Dalbello's strong objections. Dalbello then submitted four self-produced song demos to her U.S. label and manager, only to have them rejected because they wanted a real producer. Accordingly, in 1986, it was reported that Rupert Hine had finished producing a new album for Dalbello. However, regardless of the status of the Hine-produced album, partly out of frustration and partly as a practical joke, Dalbello re-submitted her self-produced song demos—crediting the producer as "Bill Da Salleo", which was nothing more than a simple anagram of her name. To her surprise, her label and manager excitedly called her up saying that they loved the new demos and believed "Bill" was the perfect producer for the project.

The Hine-produced album was subsequently scrapped, and remains unissued. However, Dalbello would contribute guest vocals to Hine's "virtual band" project Thinkman, appearing on the title track of their 1986 debut album, The Formula. Dalbello continued to produce her new album under the "Da Salleo" pseudonym, managing to keep both her label and manager from visiting the sessions by booking the studio time late at night. She broke the "news" of "Bill's premature death" to her Canadian A&R person Deane Cameron just prior to delivering the album to the label, and shortly after Cameron called her out of concern that the label had no signed production agreement between Bill Da Salleo and themselves. When the ruse was revealed, Cameron, a maverick in Canadian music circles who was the first record label A&R person to have signing autonomy from his U.S. label counterpart out of L.A., reportedly laughed out loud, proclaiming that Dalbello had "truly kicked the L.A. A&R offices' asses." However, with the knowledge that Bill Da Salleo was actually Dalbello, her manager began to question the strength of the album's production and commercial viability. It was suggested that half the album be scrapped and new songs be recorded with a new producer and other songwriters. The album was delayed 18 months as a result.

EMI released the album she in 1987. The album's singles, "Tango" and "Black on Black", were Dalbello's biggest hits. The success of she allowed her to tour extensively, particularly through Europe. After the album's release, Dalbello ended her contract with Capitol Records and decided to relocate to Los Angeles in 1990.

During her time in L.A., Dalbello spent four years expanding her musical contacts and writing songs for other artists such as Branford Marsalis and Julian Lennon, and co-writing with successful songwriters Carole Bayer Sager, Franne Golde, Bruce Roberts, Holly Knight and Gerald O'Brien. In 1991 Ronson and Dalbello discussed collaborating again. However, everything was put on hold because of a downturn in Ronson's health. Ronson died of liver failure in 1993.

In 1994 Dalbello's former manager, Roger Davies, asked her if she wanted to record another album. Through Davies' efforts, a recording deal with EMI Electrola, which is based in Germany, was forthcoming. Dalbello moved back to Toronto to complete work on her new album. She released whore in 1996, which received favorable reviews from critics upon its release. After the album's release she returned to Europe to tour for the rest of that year.

== Recording guest appearances ==
In addition to having appeared on Rush guitarist Alex Lifeson's solo album Victor, contributing the lead vocal to the song "Start Today", and having recorded duets with Duran Duran's John Taylor and Boz Scaggs ("Miss Sun" from his 1980 album "Hits"), her vocals have appeared on records for Cher, Richard Marx, Heart, Alice Cooper, Patti LaBelle, Toto, Nena (for whom she wrote an entire translation album It's All in the Game) and Canadian artists Rough Trade, Kim Mitchell and Glass Tiger.

== Cover versions of her music ==
Melissa Manchester successfully took "Pretty Girls" into the US and Canadian Top 40 in 1979. Heart covered "Wait for an Answer" and did a version of "Black on Black" called "Black on Black II". Queensrÿche covered "Gonna Get Close to You". Both Hauteville and Meliesa McDonell covered "Immaculate Eyes". Julie Masse covered "Devious Nature". Heavens Gate covered "Animal". Her song "Don't Get Mad Get Even" was recorded in 1983 by the Canadian heavy metal band Helix for their third album No Rest for the Wicked, and by The Lydia Taylor Band for their EP Bitch.

== Influence ==
Because of her powerful voice and aggressive persona, as well as her career path of starting out as a conventional mainstream dance-pop singer before reinventing herself as an idiosyncratic alternative rock artist, comparisons have been drawn between Dalbello and Alanis Morissette. However, she refused to take credit for paving the way for other female rockers like Morissette. As she explained to Jane Stevenson of the Toronto Sun, "someone like Alanis has a sense of angst, a sense of unrest within herself and that's coming from her personal experiences which are different from mine." Dalbello credited women rockers such as Chrissie Hynde (of the Pretenders), Annie Lennox (of Eurythmics) and Patti Smith as paving the way for her and others.

== Songwriter and producer for other artists ==
Dalbello has not released another album since 1996 and has primarily focused on producing and writing for other artists such as Heart, Julian Lennon, Nena, and Patti LaBelle, whom she also produced. Some of the artists and writers she has co-written with are her friends Bryan Adams, Julian Lennon and Ann and Nancy Wilson of Heart, as well as David Foster, Carole Bayer-Sager, Holly Knight, Chaka Khan, Branford Marsalis, Damhnait Doyle and Dan Hill.

== Television commercials and documentary voice work ==
Throughout her recording career, Dalbello has worked as a session vocalist and voice-over artist on TV and radio commercials in North America, as well as writing and arranging the music for them. Her voice work also expanded into areas of documentary work, as well as character voices for the TV anime series Sailor Moon, with her most well-known roles being those of the Negamonsters and Droids, the villains of the series.

In 1999, Dalbello's song "Faith in You (With All Your Heart)" was used to promote the launch of the Ford Focus automobile in North America; commercials featuring it played in movie theatres and on television. Four years later she performed the song "Always (Thinking About You)" for the Cheer detergent commercial "Coming Home" that aired in 2003, which was so popular and garnered so many inquiries, that Cheer commissioned her to do a full length version which they made available for download from their website.

From 2002 to 2008, Dalbello was the brand announcer voice for the Canadian cable news network CBC Newsworld, and her voice was heard introducing CBC News anchor Peter Mansbridge on the network's flagship nightly news and current affairs program, The National. She also was featured on the theme song for the first three seasons of the television series Degrassi: The Next Generation.

In late 2011 Dalbello recorded three 30-second songs, "Every Moment", "Lift You Up", and "Something Good", for The Keg chain of steakhouse restaurants in Canada and the United States.

In late 2012, the Juno Awards' online series, Juno TV, interviewed Dalbello, who shared her thoughts on her early career. The interview, which was one of her first recorded appearances in over 15 years, aired in June 2013.

== Personal life ==
During her time in Los Angeles, Dalbello shared a dwelling with actress Pam Grier.

Dalbello currently resides in Toronto, Ontario.

== Awards and nominations ==
- 1978 Juno Award Nomination & Win for Most Promising Female Vocalist of the Year
- 1979 Juno Award Nomination for Female Vocalist of the Year
- 1980 Juno Award Nomination for Female Vocalist of the Year
- 1982 Juno Award Nomination for Female Vocalist of the Year
- 1984 Juno Award Nomination for Female Vocalist of the Year
- 1984 Juno Award Nomination for Producer of the Year
- 1985 Juno Award Nomination for Female Vocalist of the Year

== Discography ==
- Lisa Dal Bello – EP (1974, CBC Radio Canada)
- Lisa Dal Bello (1977, MCA)
- Pretty Girls (1979, Talisman)
- Drastic Measures (1981, Capitol)
- whomanfoursays (1984, Capitol)
- she (1987, Capitol-EMI)
- whore (1996, EMI-Spin)
- Live at Rockpalast (2015, Repertoire)

== Collaborations with other artists ==
- 1980 : Eastern Wind by Chris de Burgh - Backing vocals on three songs.
- 1983 : DaDa by Alice Cooper — Backing vocals.
- 1985 : Feuer und Flamme by Nena — Dalbello rewrote the English translation of lyrics for the album except, for three bonus songs.
- 1986 : The Thin Red Line by Glass Tiger — Additional background vocals.
- 1993 : Desire Walks On by Heart — Additional background vocals.
- 1996 : Victor by Alex Lifeson — Lead vocals on one song; credited as "Dalbello".
- 1998 : Toto XX by Toto — Backing vocals on one song.
- 1999 : Kimosabe by Kim Mitchell — Backing vocals.

== Filmography ==
- Melanie (1982)
