= Musi-Video =

- Musi-Video logo 1981
- Genre: Music video series
- Created by: Marc Fontaine
- Country of origin: Canada
- Original languages: English and French

Production
- Producer: Marc Fontaine
- Production locations: Montreal, Quebec
- Running time: 60 Mins

Original release
- Network: syndicated
- Release: 1980 – 1984

Related
- MuchMusic

Musi-Video is a music video series which ran in Canada between 1980 and 1984, syndicated to community channels across Canada. It was a very early example of the format that later would be adopted by the creation of America's MTV and MuchMusic.

It was the creation of Marc Fontaine, who was also behind the new wave pop group Nudimension. Produced in Montreal, it featured early 1980s music artists playing live in a studio and early music videos.

In 2008, the Musi-Video brand was revived as a music publishing label by Marc Fontaine.

== Presenters ==
Anne Marie Cyr- The Musi-video show 1982

- Richard Berle
- Erica Ehm
- Anne Marie Cyr
- Marc Fontaine
- Andy Nulman

== Selected artists ==
The following artists have featured on Musi-Video at the beginning of their careers:

- Men Without Hats
- Simple Minds
- Nudimension
- The 222s
- Martha Ladly
