= Cassandra Vasik =

Canadian singer-songwriter

- Also known as: Cassandra Leigh
- Born: Sandra Vasicek
- Origin: Blenheim, Ontario, Canada
- Genres: Country pop
- Occupation: Singer-songwriter
- Years active: 1990–2000
- Labels: Epic, Perimeter

Cassandra Vasik is a Canadian country music singer-songwriter from Blenheim, Ontario. Signed to Epic Records, she released two albums and 11 singles for the label between 1991 and 1994.

In 1992, she won the Rising Star award at the Canadian Country Music Association Awards. She also won the 1992 and 1994 Juno Award for Best Country Female Vocalist. In 2000, Vasik released a pop album, Different, on Perimeter Records.

== Discography ==
=== Albums ===
| Title | Album details | Peak positions |
| Title | Album details | CAN Country |
|---|---|---|
| Wildflowers | Release date: 1991; Label: Epic Records | — |
| Feels Like Home | Release date: 1993; Label: Epic Records | 20 |
| Different | Release date: May 16, 2000; Label: Perimeter Records | — |
"—" denotes releases that did not chart

=== Singles ===
| Year | Title | Peak chart positions | | Album |
| Year | Title | CAN Country | CAN AC | Album |
|---|---|---|---|---|
| 1991 | "The Black Book" | — | — | Wildflowers |
| 1991 | "It Comes Back to You" | 14 | — | Wildflowers |
| 1992 | "Which Face Should I Put On Tonight" | 5 | — | Wildflowers |
| 1992 | "Wildflowers" | 10 | 27 | Wildflowers |
| 1992 | "Those Stars" | 20 | — | Wildflowers |
| 1993 | "Sadly Mistaken" | 7 | — | Feels Like Home |
| 1993 | "Fortune Smiled on Me" (with Russell deCarle) | 11 | — | Feels Like Home |
| 1993 | "Roll Like a Wheel" | 9 | — | Feels Like Home |
| 1993 | "Almost Like You Cared" | 18 | — | Feels Like Home |
| 1994 | "Stand Your Ground" | 27 | — | Feels Like Home |
| 1994 | "Human Highway" (with Jim Witter) | 24 | — | Borrowed Tunes: A Tribute to Neil Young |
"—" denotes releases that did not chart

==== Guest singles ====
| Year | Title | Artist | Peak positions | Album |
| Year | Title | Artist | CAN Country | Album |
|---|---|---|---|---|
| 1994 | "Chains" | Tim Thorney | 54 | Some Other Time |

=== Music videos ===
| Year | Title |
|---|---|
| 1991 | "The Black Book" |
| 1992 | "Which Face Should I Put On Tonight" |
| 1992 | "Wildflowers" |
| 1993 | "Sadly Mistaken" |
