= Anne Marie Cyr =

French Canadian TV presenter and singer

- Born: 1963 (age 62–63); Montreal, Quebec, Canada
- Genres: Synthpop, pop
- Occupations: TV presenter, singer
- Instrument: Vocals
- Years active: 1982–1986
- Labels: Illusion, Saisons, Musi-video

Song samples
- "Big Boy" (English): file; help

Anne Marie Cyr (born 1963) was a French Canadian TV presenter and occasional model; who was active during the early 1980s. Born and raised in Montreal, Quebec, Canada, Cyr came to prominence in her late teens on Montreal cable television assisting and presenting on shows such as Musi-Video (a forerunner to Canada's MuchMusic). She fitted in her television presenting and pop career with studying communications at Montreal's Concordia University.

In early 1983, Nudimension released the francophone single "Amour Programmé" which was a synthpop song by singer/drummer songwriter Louis Rondeau (former singer/drummer/songwriter for the 222s) and Cyr performed the spoken word elements of the track. Released on the Ciel and Saisons labels principally in Quebec, it became a minor hit in the francophone regions of Canada; and by export in France and remaining North America. Cyr and Rondeau appeared together on the Canadian network television show Lautrec '83 (presented by Donald Lautrec) to promote the single, her highest-profile television performance. She also appeared on CFCF-TV on Friday night's Nite Life presented by Peter King.

Cyr continues to live in Montreal, but no longer works in the media.

== Discography ==
Cyr only ever recorded with Nudimension and is listed as a "special guest" on record sleeves. She was Nudimension's principal female vocalist and appears in the following releases:

- "Amour Programmé" – 1983 (Fr)
- "Obsession" – 1983 (Fr)
- "Rendezvous" – 1983 (En)
- "Hors la loi" – 1984 (Fr)
- "Big Boy" – 1984 (En)
