= Drastic Measures (Dalbello album) =

Studio album by Lisa Dalbello
- Released: 1981
- Studios: Cherokee Studios, Los Angeles, California
- Genres: Rock, pop rock
- Label: Capitol
- Producers: Bob Esty, Jim Vallance

Lisa Dalbello chronology
Pretty Girls (1979)	Drastic Measures (1981)	whomanfoursays (1984)

Professional ratings
Review scores
Source	Rating
Allmusic	[]

Drastic Measures is the third studio album by Canadian singer Lisa Dalbello. It includes songs written together with Bryan Adams and her mother Yolanda Dalbello. Musicians invited on the album include guitarist John Goodsall, who has played with Atomic Rooster, Brand X and Bill Bruford, Jeff Baxter who is known for his work with The Doobie Brothers and Steely Dan, and drummer Ric Parnell who was also a member of Atomic Rooster. Ben Mink, who plays violin on one song, also played with the American band Heart, singer k.d. lang and collaborated with Rush frontman Geddy Lee on Lee's 2000 solo album.

== Track listing ==
No.	Title	Lyrics	Length
1.	"Never Get to Heaven"	Lisa Dalbello, Yolanda Dalbello, Bryan Adams	3:00
2.	"You Could Be Good for Me"	Lisa Dalbello, Bryan Adams	3:21
3.	"Just Like You"	Lisa Dalbello, Tim Thorney	3:22
4.	"Princess Telephone"	Lisa Dalbello, Yolanda Dalbello, Tim Thorney	3:27
5.	"She Wants to Know"	Lisa Dalbello, Bryan Adams	3:34
6.	"What Your Mama Don't Know"	Lisa Dalbello, Tim Thorney	2:52
7.	"It's Over"	Lisa Dalbello, Tim Thorney	3:25
8.	"Bad Timing"	Lisa Dalbello, Garry Nichol, Tim Thorney	3:04
9.	"Dr. Noble"	Lisa Dalbello, Yolanda Dalbello, Tim Thorney	3:33
10.	"Stereo Madness"	Lisa Dalbello, Garry Nichol, Tim Thorney	4:39

== Singles ==
- "Never Get to Heaven"
- "She Wants to Know"

== Personnel ==
- Lisa Dalbello - vocals, piano, LM-1 drum machine
- John Goodsall, Garry Nichol - guitar
- Jeff Baxter – lead guitar on "She Wants to Know" and "What Your Mama Don't Know"
- Doug Lunn, Rick Homme - bass
- Tom Dahl - keyboards, synthesizers
- Paul Delph - Prophet 10 synthesizer
- Bob Esty - piano
- Bruce Robb – Hammond B-3 organ solo on "It's Over"
- Ben Mink – electric violin solo on "Just Like You"
- Ric Parnell, Barry Keane - drums
- Bill Smith, Tim Thorney - percussion
- Cal Dodd, Billy Ledster, David Roberts, Bob Segarini, Tim Thorney, St. Matrona's 7th Grade Class, Bob Esty, Lisa Dalbello - backing vocals

== Production ==
- Producers : Jim Vallance, Bob Esty
- Produced by: Bob Esty for Fave Rave Productions
- Basic tracks for "Dr. Noble," "Just Like You" & Stereo Madness" Produced by Jim Vallance
- Recorded & Re-mixed at Cherokee Studios, Los Angeles, CA
- Basic tracks for "Bad Timing," Dr. Noble," "Just Like You" and " Stereo Madness" recorded at Manta Sound Studios, Toronto, ON
- Engineer: Hayward Parrott
- Assistant Engineers: Paul Henderson & Dave Taylor
- Engineer: Jo Robb
- Assistant Engineer: Paul Ray
- Mastered at Precision Lacquers, Hollywood CA by Stephen Marcussen
- Stephen King - photography
