= Black on Black (song) =

1985 song by Dalbello

Single by Dalbello

from the album she
- B-side: "Baby Doll"
- Released: 1985
- Genre: Alternative
- Length: 4:00
- Label: Capitol
- Songwriter: Dalbello
- Producers: Dalbello; Michael Beinhorn

Dalbello singles chronology
"Animal" (1984)	"Black on Black" (1985)	"Tango" (1987)

"Black on Black" is a song written and performed by Canadian singer Dalbello. It was first released as a single in 1985 and was re-recorded for Dalbello's fifth studio album she, released in 1987. The song is best known for its 1993 Top Five Mainstream Rock Chart cover by American hard rock band Heart, released as "Black on Black II" (with updated lyrics and additional songwriting credits from Ann and Nancy Wilson) for their eleventh studio album Desire Walks On.

Dalbello wrote and demoed "Black on Black" in 1985, and it was first released as a non-album single in Europe in the late part of that year. The song was included on the soundtrack to the American erotic romantic drama film 9½ Weeks, which was released in February 1986. The director Adrian Lyne had heard Dalbello's 1984 album Whomanfoursays and contacted her with the request of writing the film's score. Due to touring commitments, she was unable to accept the offer, but instead provided the completed demo versions of "Black on Black" and "Baby Doll" for his consideration.

Despite its release as a single and inclusion on the 9½ Weeks soundtrack, Dalbello always considered the 1985 recording of "Black on Black" to be an unfinished demo. She would release a completed version of the song on her 1987 album she. The she version was also released as a single in some European countries in 1988.

"Black on Black" starts with a looped sample from Gregorio Allegri's work "Miserere mei, Deus".

== Critical reception ==
In a review of the 1989 Canadian re-issue of she, Evelyn Erskine of The Ottawa Citizen described "Black on Black" as "an awesome piece of pop music". She added, "It deals with religious organizations and the power they have over their congregations, a theme that Dalbello unfolds in a way that grates on the edge of profanity while firing out the lyrics like a torrent of daggers." Gerry Krochak of The Leader-Post considered the song to be one of the "marvelous vehicles" on she for Dalbello's "powerful, clear voice" and "talents as [a] songwriter, instrumentalist and programmer".

== Track listing ==
7-inch single

1. "Black on Black" – 4:00
2. "Baby Doll" – 3:34

12-inch single

1. "Black on Black" (Extended Version) – 6:15
2. "Baby Doll" – 3:34

7-inch single (1988 release)

1. "Black on Black" – 4:21
2. "Baby Doll" – 4:05

== Personnel ==
=== 1985 version ===
- Dalbello – vocals, synthesizers, DMX drum program
- Asher Horowitz – guitar
- Steve Webster – bass
- Rob Yale – fairlight programming

Production

- Dalbello – producer, mixing
- Michael Beinhorn – producer
- Lenny DeRose – engineer, mixing

Other

- Heather Brown – art direction, design
- Douglas Brown – photography

=== 1987 version ===
- Dalbello – vocals, backing vocals, keyboards, Hammond B3, drums
- Asher Horowitz – guitar
- Steve Webster – bass
- Scott Humphrey – PPG/HDD, drums

Production

- Dalbello – producer, mixing
- Lenny DeRose – recording, mixing
- Earl Tomo – recording assistant
- Mike Ging, Kevin Whyte, Noel Rafferty – assistant mixers

Other

- Stylorouge – design, art direction
- Richard Haughton – photography

== Heart version ==
"Black on Black II"

Single by Heart

from the album Desire Walks On
- Released: 1993
- Genre: Hard rock; Heavy metal
- Length: 3:51
- Label: Capitol
- Songwriters: Ann Wilson; Nancy Wilson; Dalbello
- Producers: John Purdell; Duane Baron

Heart singles chronology
"You're the Voice" (1991)	"Black on Black II" (1993)	"Will You Be There (In the Morning)" (1993)

In 1993, American rock band Heart recorded a version of the song, titled "Black on Black II", for their eleventh studio album Desire Walks On. Heart's version was produced by John Purdell and Duane Baron, and featured additional writing credits to Ann Wilson and Nancy Wilson. "Black On Black II" was released as a promotional single in North America and a single in Australasia. It peaked at No. 4 on the Billboard Mainstream Rock chart in November 1993.

=== Critical reception ===
In a review of Desire Walks On, Anita M. Seline of the Hartford Courant described the song as having "the familiar Heart riff and Ann Wilson's strong singing". Wallace Baine of the Santa Cruz Sentinel wrote, "Desire Walks On opens with a hurricane-force rocker called 'Black on Black II', propelled by a galloping guitar riff borrowed from the '70s hit 'Barracuda'." Michael Dunn of The Tampa Tribune wrote, "With 'Desire' and 'Black on Black II' as dual openers, the band pushes the pedal to the metal with a 'Barracuda'-like riff that shatters the speed limit in most states."

Chuck Campbell of the Scripps Howard News Service felt the song "may as well be 'Barracuda II' thanks to its familiar chops". Jim Abbott of the Orlando Sentinel noted, "The chunky, thundering bass of 'Black on Black II' sounds like Ann and Nancy are sampling from 'Barracuda' - although on that song, Ann's voice didn't quite reach the level of strident histrionics attained here."

Dale Martin of The Victoria Advocate considered the song's "hard-rock drive" to be "reminiscent of the group's 'Barracuda' days" and therefore "reassures fans that the band hasn't strayed far from its early sound". Tony Norman of the Pittsburgh Post-Gazette noted Wilson's "lethal-weapon voice" which "kicks more tail than on any tune since 'Barracuda'."

=== Track listing ===
CD single

1. "Black on Black II" – 3:51
2. "Anything Is Possible" – 5:05
3. "Crazy on You" (Acoustic Version) – 4:44
4. The Lovemongers – "Battle of Evermore" – 5:37

CD single (promo)

1. "Black on Black II" – 3:51

=== Personnel ===
Heart

- Ann Wilson – lead vocals
- Nancy Wilson – electric guitar, backing vocals
- Howard Leese – electric guitar
- Denny Carmassi – drums

Additional musicians

- Schuyler Deale – bass
- John Purdell – keyboards
- Dalbello – additional backing vocals

Production

- John Purdell – producer
- Duane Baron – producer, engineer
- Mick Guzauski – mixing
- George Marino – mastering

=== Charts ===
Chart (1993)	Peak position
Canada Top Singles (RPM)	59
US Mainstream Rock (Billboard)	4
