= Jackson Hawke =

Canadian musical group

- Origin: Sault Ste. Marie, Ontario, Canada
- Genres: Pop rock
- Years active: 1974–1978
- Label: Columbia
- Past members: Tim Ryan; Bob Yeomans; Gene Falbo; Chris Castle; Garry Holt; JP Hawkins; Bob Clarke; Bucky Berger

Jackson Hawke was a Canadian pop rock band, principally active during 1976–1978 and most notable for its song "You Can't Dance", which became an international hit for England Dan and John Ford Coley.

== History ==
Jackson Hawke was co-founded in 1974 by Tim Ryan and Bob Yeomans. The two had originally begun working together as professional musicians in 1963 and had earlier been managed by noted Canadian manager, promoter and record producer Bernie Finkelstein. (Note: Finkelstein, later the founder of True North Records, at the time managed The Paupers and Kensington Market, two of the early Canadian bands from the mid-1960s to achieve a degree of international success, including U.S. recording contracts. Kensington Market included Keith McKie, a Sault Ste. Marie native who had first gained local fame with The Vendettas.) Ryan and Yeomans, originally from Sault Ste. Marie, Ontario, had been in an early Canadian garage band, The Amen.

In addition to Ryan on lead vocals and guitar and Yeomans on guitar, the original lineup of Jackson Hawke was completed by Gene Falbo on bass (Note: Gene Falbo has continued his career as a side and session musician. See Profile of Gene Falbo; www.loumoore.com. He was recently associated with The Stickmen (www.iridescentmusic.ca), one of several bands he has played in with longtime guitarist friend Bernie LaBarge; www.bernielabarge.com.) and Chris Castle on drums. (Note: Chris Castle is now a music attorney in Los Angeles, having been a member of the bands of Long John Baldry, Jesse Winchester and Yvonne Elliman. See Profile of Chris Castle; www.christiancastle.com.) Later guitarists were Garry Holt & JP Hawkins. Later drummers were Bob Clarke (previously with Ryan and Yeomans in The Amen) and Bucky Berger. Jackson Hawke was particularly prominent in Canada during the 1976–1978 period, releasing three singles and two albums on CBS Records. They were at one time associated with Canadian publicist and entertainment manager Gino Empry.

Their first single, released in 1976, was a double-sided hit, featuring the original "You Can't Dance" and a version of Van Morrison's "Into The Mystic". "You Can't Dance" later became an international hit when released in 1978 by England Dan and John Ford Coley. The song was also covered and released as a successful single by Ricky Nelson. The band's 1977 single, "Set Me Free", peaked at number 54 in Canada, but went to number 11 on the CHUM Chart in Toronto.

Tim Ryan developed a solo career both before and after Jackson Hawke. In 1973, he represented Canada in the Tokyo for the World song festival. In 1984, he was nominated for a Juno Award as "Most Promising Male Vocalist of The Year". He also developed a successful career singing commercial jingles.

In December 2007, both The Amen and Jackson Hawke reunited for the "18 Forever" festival in Sault Ste. Marie, commemorating the musicians who had originally gained fame in Sault Ste. Marie in the 1960s, which is regarded as a seminal period in that city's music history.

Tim Ryan died in Toronto on June 2, 2016, at the age of 67, following heart surgery. Bob Yeomans died in Sault Ste Marie on January 22, 2022.

== Discography ==
- 1976 Forever (CBS)
- 1977 Jackson Hawke (CBS)
