= Desire Walks On =

1993 studio album by Heart

Studio album by Heart
- Released: November 16, 1993
- Recorded: 1992–1993
- Genres: Hard rock; pop rock; folk rock
- Length: 51:09
- Label: Capitol
- Producers: John Purdell; Duane Baron

Heart chronology
| Rock the House Live! (1991) | Desire Walks On (1993) | The Road Home (1995) |

Singles from Desire Walks On
- 1. "Will You Be There (In the Morning)" Released: November 1993; 2. "The Woman in Me" Released: 1994

Professional ratings
Review scores
| Source | Rating |
|---|---|
| AllMusic | 2.5/5 stars |
| Music Week | 3/5 stars |
| People | Favorable |

Desire Walks On is the eleventh studio album by American rock band Heart, released on November 16, 1993, by Capitol Records. The majority of the album was co-written by lead members Ann and Nancy Wilson. It is Heart's final studio album to feature longtime members Howard Leese, who joined in 1975 and, aside from the Wilson sisters, is the band's longest-serving member, and Denny Carmassi, who had been its drummer since 1982. Layne Staley, lead vocalist of the Seattle grunge band Alice in Chains, sings with the Wilson sisters on the cover of Bob Dylan's "Ring Them Bells".

The album peaked at number 48 on the US Billboard 200, and on August 24, 1995, it was certified gold by the Recording Industry Association of America (RIAA), denoting shipments in excess of 500,000 copies in the United States. Desire Walks On spawned three charting singles: "Will You Be There (In the Morning)", which reached number 39 on the US Billboard Hot 100 chart, "Black on Black II" (a cover of a Dalbello song originally recorded for the 9½ Weeks film soundtrack), which peaked at number four on Billboard's Mainstream Rock chart, and "The Woman in Me", which peaked at number 24 on Billboard's Adult Contemporary chart.

The original 1993 European release and the 2001 US re-release were expanded to add Spanish-language versions of "The Woman in Me" and "Will You Be There (In the Morning)", the latter in a remixed format.

== Critical reception ==
Critical response to Desire Walks On was mixed to negative. Reviewers noted that the album was released during a period when many 1970s and 1980s arena rock and pop-metal acts were struggling due to the rise of alternative rock and grunge. Critics suggested that Heart’s style on the album appeared increasingly out of step with prevailing trends, reflecting a sense of uncertainty about the band’s direction. Variety called the album "unfocused and inconsistent." AllMusic described the release as “unimpressive”, citing “unevenness and a shortage of really strong material”.

Some reviewers pointed to individual tracks as relative highlights, despite an overall sense of "confusion" across the album. One retrospective review argued that only "Crazy Head" and “Will You Be There (In the Morning)” stood out, noting that the latter, despite being rather formulaic, would have worked better as the album opener. In contrast, the opening track “Black on Black II” was criticized for its harsh production and vocal delivery.

== Track listing ==
| No. | Title | Writer(s) | Length |
|---|---|---|---|
| 1. | "Desire" | | 0:18 |
| 2. | "Black on Black II" | Lisa Dalbello; Ann Wilson; Nancy Wilson | 3:51 |
| 3. | "Back to Avalon" | A. Wilson; N. Wilson; Kit Hain | 3:40 |
| 4. | "The Woman in Me" | Michael Clark; John Bettis | 4:00 |
| 5. | "Rage" | A. Wilson; N. Wilson; Sue Ennis | 5:01 |
| 6. | "In Walks the Night" | A. Wilson; N. Wilson; Daniel O'Brien; Tina Harris | 6:01 |
| 7. | "My Crazy Head" | A. Wilson; N. Wilson; Ennis | 4:31 |
| 8. | "Ring Them Bells" | Bob Dylan | 3:49 |
| 9. | "Will You Be There (In the Morning)" | Robert John "Mutt" Lange | 4:29 |
| 10. | "Voodoo Doll" | A. Wilson; N. Wilson; Amy Sky; John Capek | 4:52 |
| 11. | "Anything Is Possible" | A. Wilson; N. Wilson; Dalbello | 5:00 |
| 12. | "Avalon (Reprise)" | | 0:31 |
| 13. | "Desire Walks On" | A. Wilson; N. Wilson; Ennis | 5:06 |
| Total length: | | | 51:09 |

European and Japanese edition bonus tracks
| No. | Title | Writer(s) | Length |
|---|---|---|---|
| 14. | "La Mujer Que Hay en Mi" | Clark; Bettis | 4:02 |
| 15. | "Te Quedaras (En la Mañana)" | Lange | 4:40 |
| Total length: | | | 59:51 |

== Personnel ==
Credits adapted from the liner notes of Desire Walks On.

=== Heart ===
- Ann Wilson – lead vocals
- Nancy Wilson – acoustic and electric guitars, lead and background vocals
- Howard Leese – acoustic and electric guitars, background vocals; bass (track 4)
- Denny Carmassi – drums, percussion; sequencing (track 4)

=== Additional musicians ===
- Schuyler Deale – bass
- John Purdell – keyboards, background vocals
- Dalbello – additional background vocal
- Duane Barron – additional background vocal
- Layne Staley – 3rd lead vocal (track 8)
- String section
  - Ella Marie Gray – violin
  - Walter Gray – cello
  - Timothy Hale – viola
  - Simon James – violin
  - Cole Chance Steichen – bell tree (track 8)

=== Technical ===
- John Purdell – production, mixing
- Duane Barron – production, engineering, mixing
- Mick Guzauski – mixing (tracks 1–8, 10–13)
- Mike Shipley – mixing (track 9)
- Ed Brooks, Gregor Visconty, Tom McGurk, Todd Lehmkuhl – engineering assistance
- Don Grierson – executive production
- George Marino – mastering at Sterling Sound (New York City)

=== Artwork ===
- Tommy Steele – art direction
- Jeff Fey – design
- Scott Morgan – photography

== Charts ==
Chart performance for Desire Walks On
| Chart (1993–1994) | Peak position |
|---|---|
| Australian Albums (ARIA) | 55 |
| Canada Top Albums/CDs (RPM) | 36 |
| European Albums (Music & Media) | 61 |
| Finnish Albums (Suomen virallinen lista) | 19 |
| Japanese Albums (Oricon) | 20 |
| Swedish Albums (Sverigetopplistan) | 24 |
| Swiss Albums (Schweizer Hitparade) | 46 |
| UK Albums (Official Charts) | 32 |
| US Billboard 200 | 48 |

== Certifications ==
Certifications for Desire Walks On
| Region | Certification | Certified units/sales |
|---|---|---|
| Canada (Music Canada) | Gold | 50,000^{^} |
| United States (RIAA) | Gold | 500,000^{^} |
^{^} Shipments figures based on certification alone.
