= Pretty Girls (album) =

Studio album by Lisa Dalbello
- Released: 1979
- Genre: Pop, rock
- Label: Talisman
- Producer: Al Ciner, Bob Monaco

Lisa Dalbello chronology
Lisa Dal Bello (1977)	Pretty Girls (1979)	Drastic Measures (1981)

Pretty Girls is the second studio album by Canadian singer Lisa Dalbello, released in 1979 by Talisman Records. Following her departure from MCA Records, the album was initially an independent release before being picked up by Capitol Records for a wider distribution. The title track, "Pretty Girls," gained notable attention when Melissa Manchester’s cover version became a US Top 40 hit later that year. Dalbello’s performance on the album earned her a Juno Award nomination for Female Vocalist of the Year in 1979, her second such honor. The album reflects her early pop and soul roots, setting the stage for her later shift toward alternative rock.

== Track listing ==
No.	Title	Lyrics	Length
1.	"Pretty Girls"	Dal Bello	3:00
2.	"Still in Love"	Dal Bello, David Jollitte	3:35
3.	"Hollywood"	Dal Bello	3:40
4.	"(Is There) Anything I Can Do"	Lisa Dal Bello	3:50
5.	"Talisman"	Dal Bello, Joey Miquelon, Liz Lauzanne	4:30
6.	"Make Up Your Mind Paula"	Dal Bello	3:08
7.	"Miracle Maker"	Dal Bello, Janet Keen	3:40
8.	"Lost Without Your Love"	Dal Bello, Lauzanne	3:52
9.	"Dreams (Are for Lovers)"	Dal Bello	3:48
10.	"Make It Last"	Dal Bello	3:56

== Personnel ==
- Lisa Dal Bello – lead and backing vocals
- Michael Boddicker – synthesizer
- Jay Gruska – synthesizer
- Fred Mandel – organ
- Tom Hensley – piano
- Ron Stockert – piano
- Steve Porcaro – synthesizer programming
- Al Ciner – guitar
- Steve Lukather – guitar
- Richie Zito – guitar
- Dennis Belfield – bass guitar
- Ron Garant – bass guitar
- Mike Porcaro – bass guitar
- Carlos Vega – drums
- Bobby Ruffino – percussion
- Victor Feldman – percussion
- Bill Champlin – backing vocals
- Roy Kenner – backing vocals
- Bobby Kimball – backing vocals
- Liz Lausanne – backing vocals
- Michael McDonald – backing vocals
- Lisa Mordente – backing vocals

== Production ==
- Bob Monaco – producer
- Al Ciner – producer
- Denis Degher – engineer
- Phil Moores – engineer
- Chris Gordon – engineer
- Gary Gray – engineer
