= The 222s =

Canadian punk band

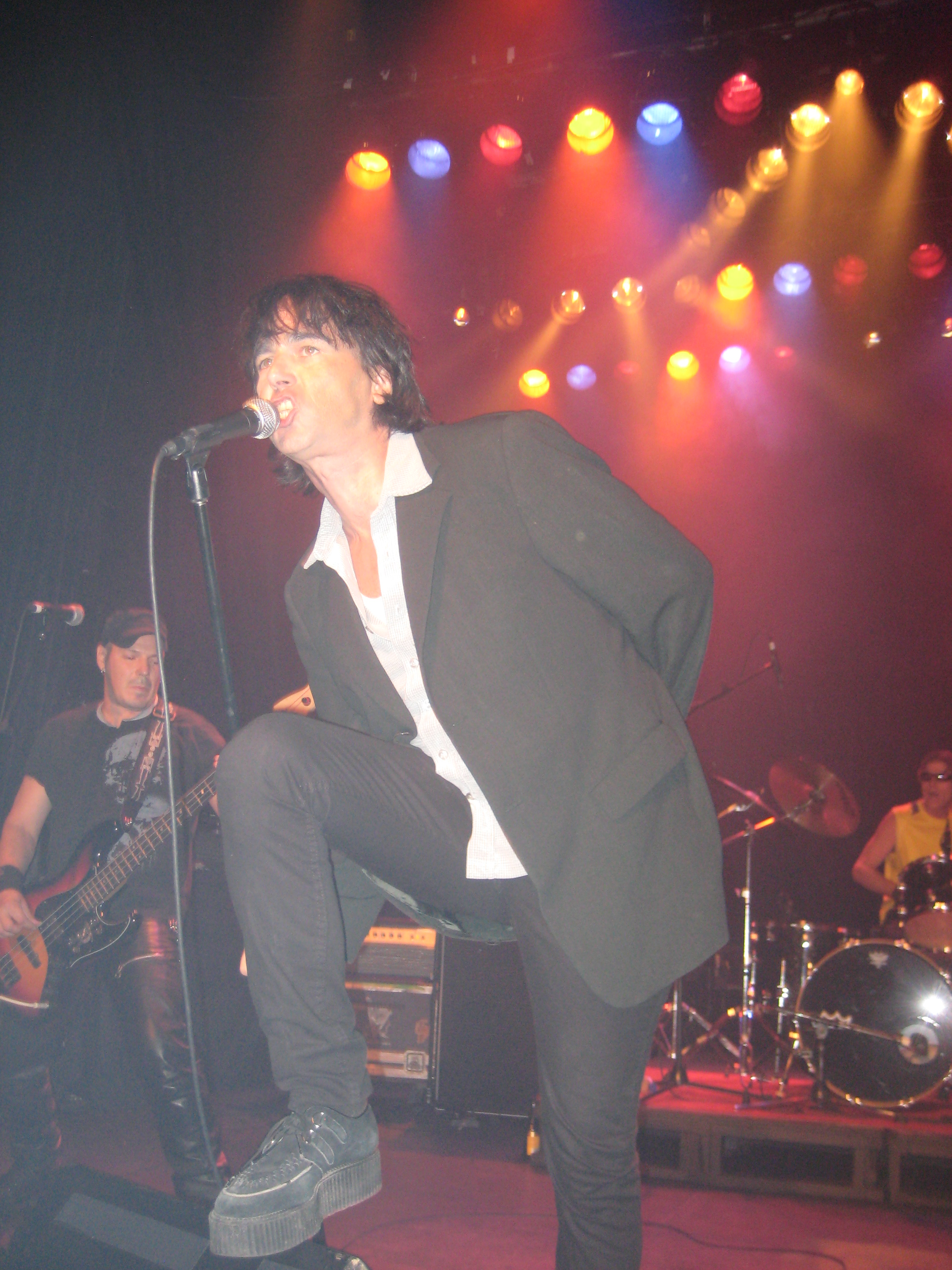
- The 222's playing in Montreal in 2010: Cerrato, Barry, Louie Rondeau

Background information
- Origin: Canada
- Genre: Punk rock
- Years active: 1978–2010
- Label: Rebel Gamma Sonik's Chicken Shrimp
- Past members: Pierre Major; Jean Brisson; Angel Calvo; Louie Rondeau; Christian Belleau; Chris Barry; Joe Cerrato

"I Love Susan" song
- 30-second sample: file; help

The 222s was a Canadian punk band active from 1978 to 2018. They are among the first original Canadian punk bands and the first to emerge from Montreal. They are best known for their 1979 single I Love Susan.

== History ==
The 222s, who took their name from the painkiller of the same name, was formed in 1977, by guitarist Pierre 'Al Cleann' Major and singer Jean 'Frisson' Brisson, bass player/drummer Angel Calvo, and drummer, keyboardist and singer Louie 'Louie Louis' Rondeau. The band played a handful of gigs around Montreal, mostly in high schools.

Calvo left the band and was replaced by bassist Christian 'Chris O'Bell' Belleau, while Brisson's departure coincided with the recording of the 222s first single, I Love Susan b/w The First Studio Bomb. Rondeau took on lead vocals. Released in the fall of 1978, on manager François Doyon's Rebel Records, I Love Susan b/w The First Studio Bomb was the first DIY punk single ever released in the province of Quebec.

Just as the single was coming out, Chris Barry, a 16-year-old high school student, joined the band. Barry brought his friend Joe Cerrato into the group to replace Belleau on bass.

In 1981, the band had been performing a cover of Michel Polnareff's La Poupée qui fait Non, and went into the studio to record it. The 7" "La poupée qui fait non", with an instrumental version of the song on the B-Side, was released in 1981 on Gamma Records and got a fair amount of airplay in Quebec.

Over the course of their career, the 222s toured Canada extensively. They toured in the USA with the Nuclear Accidents and, on several occasions, played New York's Max's Kansas City. There were also appearances on a local Community television show called The Musi-Video show, which was produced by Marc Fontaine. These shows have since resurfaced on YouTube and elsewhere and have sparked a renewed interest in the band.

In 2006, the Italian punk label Rave Up Records released the collected tracks of The 222s, on an album called She Wants Revenge. In 2007, Montreal label Sonik's Chicken Shrimp Records released an anthology of the band's demos under the name Montreal Punk '78-'81.

=== Post-Breakup ===
Pierre Major joined Montreal band The Dazzlers. Louie Rondeau teamed up with the 222s assistant manager Marc Fontaine in 1982 to form the successful synthpop group Nudimension. Together they composed a top-10 Quebec chart hit Amour Programmé and, with Peerless Records in Mexico, the dance hit Rendez-vous (La Coqueteando).

Chris Barry was briefly in a band named 'Bram' with Michael Bramon; they recorded a few demos but Barry moved to England, where he would join with ex-Sex Pistols bassist Glen Matlock and ex-Generation X guitar player James Stevenson in a band called Hot Club (which would become Johnny Hates Jazz. Barry then joined the Southern Death Cult, trying to become the new singer following Ian Astbury's departure, but that didn't work out either. In the spring of 1983, he was about to start a band with former The Police guitar player Henri Padovani, former Clash drummer Topper Headon and former Pretenders bassist Pete Farndon but the project ended when Farndon died of a heroin overdose. Chris then started a solo project with ex-Generation X drummer Mark Laff. Broke and homeless, Barry returned to Montreal when CBS Records, which had heard the Bram demos, paid for his plane ticket.

In 1984, Barry reformed the 222s with Major and Cerrato. With the addition of drummer André Gagné and guitar player Richard Paul, they became the '39 Steps' and released three albums. In 1986, they appeared (as themselves) in the Woody Allen movie Hannah and Her Sisters, playing their hit "Slip into the Crowd" at the CBGB.

Barry then moved to New York to join the band Pillbox (NYC), then back to Montreal to form the band Acrylic, which recorded an album that was never released because the record company went bankrupt. He then started The Throbbing Purple with Dawson, Unruled guitar player Michel "Wax" Cyr, and ex-Subhumans drummer David "Salty" Macanulty. In 2006, the band released the "Let it Writhe" CD on Sonik's Chicken Shrimp Records.

Barry eventually became a journalist. Major and Brisson went into the tech sector. Rondeau founded a post-production studio.

=== 2010 Reunion ===
In 2010 the lineup of Belleau, Barry, Major and Rondeau reformed and performed at festivals in Ontario and Quebec.

== Discography ==
=== Singles ===
- "I Love Suzan"/"The First Studio Bomb" (1979), Rebel Records
- "La poupée qui fait non"/"La poupée qui fait non" (1981), Gamma Records

=== Compilations ===
- She Wants Revenge (2006), Rave Up Records
- Montreal Punk '78-'81 (2007), Sonik's Chicken Shrimp Records
