= Lisa Dal Bello (album) =

Studio album by Lisa Dalbello
- Released: 1977
- Studios: United Western, Hollywood; Producers Workshop, Hollywood; Sound City, Van Nuys
- Genres: Pop, rock
- Label: MCA
- Producer: David Foster

Lisa Dalbello chronology
Lisa Dal Bello (1977)	Pretty Girls (1979)

Lisa Dal Bello is the self-titled debut studio album by Canadian singer Lisa Dalbello. The album was produced by David Foster and won the Juno Award for Most Promising Female Vocalist.

== Track listing ==
No.	Title	Lyrics	Length
1.	"Look at Me (Millions of People)"	Dalbello	3:36
2.	"(Don't Want to) Stand in Your Way"	Dalbello, Roy Kenner	3:47
3.	"My Mind's Made Up"	Dalbello, David Foster	3:59
4.	"Snow White"	Dalbello	3:02
5.	"Touch Me"	Dalbello	4:48
6.	"Talk It Over (Even Though My Body's Cold)"	Dalbello	4:12
7.	"Stay with Me"	Dalbello	3:57
8.	"Day Dream"	Dalbello, Foster	3:42
9.	"Milk & Honey"	Dalbello, Foster	3:18
10.	"Everything Money Can Buy"	Dalbello	4:53

== Personnel ==
- Lisa Dal Bello - lead vocals, backing vocals; string arrangement on "Touch Me" and "Everything Money Can Buy"
- Eddie Patterson, Jay Graydon, Jay Lewis, Steve Lukather, Larry Carlton - guitar
- Mike Porcaro, "Pops" Popwell, David Hungate - bass guitar
- David Foster - Fender Rhodes piano, piano, Clavinet, rhythm arrangements
- Charles Mims Jr. - Oberheim synthesizer
- Richard Baker - Oberheim synthesizer, Moog synthesizer
- David Paich - Moog synthesizer
- Jeffrey Porcaro - drums, percussion
- Nigel Olsson - drums on "Everything Money Can Buy"
- Philip Bailey - percussion on "Day Dream"
- Israel Baker - violin on "Touch Me"
- The Seawind Horns - horns
- Tom Scott - saxophone solo on "Stay With Me"
- Brian Russell - devil's vocal on "Talk It Over (Even Though My Body's Cold)"
- Bill Champlin, Brian Russell, Roy Galloway, Carmen Twillie, Venette Gloud, Jay Gruska, Michelle Gruska, Patrice Rushen, Steve Lukather - backing vocals

Technical

- Jay Lewis, Matt Hyde, Keith Olsen – engineer
- Linda Tyler - second engineer
- George Osaki - art direction
- Olivier Ferrand - photography

== CD ==
- Lisa Dal Bello, UICY-3059, Universal Japan (2000-12-20).
- Lisa Dal Bello, UICY-94654, Universal Japan (2011-12-29), cardboard sleeve (mini LP), SHM-CD, limited release.
