= Cheer (brand) =

Laundry detergent brand

- Current owner: Procter & Gamble
- Country: United States
- Introduced: 1950; 76 years ago
- Tagline: Cleans Clothes Bright
- Website: www.cheer.com

Cheer is a laundry detergent sold in the United States and Canada. It is manufactured by Procter & Gamble.

== History ==
Cheer was introduced in 1950, and after a slight reformulation in 1952, was a highly successful follow up to P&G's Tide product from 1948 to 1949.

Cheer is recognized for its distinctive blue granules, which formerly gave it the nickname "Blue Cheer". The 1952 formula ("Blue-Magic Whitener") was designed to clean as well as perform bluing, which makes white clothing look whiter (this was traditionally a separate process). Magazine and television ads at the time proclaimed, "...washes clothes so clean, so white, you don't need bluing or bleach!" This was well known as a sponsor of I Love Lucy. Kinescopes exist of 1950s soap opera episodes with commercials for Cheer still intact, it being a sponsor of shows like The Brighter Day, As the World Turns & Another World all three shows were owned by P&G

In the 1960s, the brand was repositioned as "All Temperature Cheer" or as it was also known, "All-Tempa-Cheer", as it was said to be formulated to clean clothes effectively in all water temperatures.

As of the mid-2020s, Cheer detergent is still being sold as a detergent designed for darks and colored clothing. Procter & Gamble previously manufactured Tide Plus ColorGuard as a replacement for Tide Total Care, and to compete with Cheer back in 2014, but it has since been discontinued. The current Cheer product is now known as “Cheer ColorGuard.”

Previously, there was also a variant called “Cheer BrightClean” introduced in 2008 which was heavily marketed to compete with Tide.

The brand was the Jerry Seinfeld character's favorite type of detergent on the show Seinfeld, as seen in the episode "The Sponge". As "Blue Cheer", the brand also gave its name to a variety of LSD produced by San Francisco chemist Owsley Stanley.

Additionally, as of September 2023, Procter & Gamble has discontinued manufacturing the powdered version of Cheer, though the liquid version is still available. For those seeking a powdered alternative, P&G brands Tide and Gain are offered in both powdered and liquid forms.
