= Victor (Alex Lifeson album) =

Studio album by Alex Lifeson (as Victor)
- Released: January 9, 1996
- Recorded: October 1994 – July 1995
- Studio: Lerxst Sound
- Genres: Hard rock, alternative metal
- Length: 50:24
- Labels: Anthem Records (Canada); Atlantic (outside Canada)
- Producer: Alex Lifeson

Professional ratings
Review scores
Source	Rating
AllMusic	2/5 stars
The Essential Rock Discography	3/10
MusicHound Rock	1/5 stars

Victor is the debut solo album by Rush guitarist Alex Lifeson under the pseudonym "Victor", released in January 1996 on Anthem Records. The album was recorded at Lerxst Sound (Lifeson's home studio) from October 1994 through July 1995.

The album reached number 99 on the Billboard 200 in 1996 and received a 1997 Juno Award nomination for Best New Group.

== Track listing ==
No.	Title	Writer(s)	Length
1.	"Don't Care"	Alex Lifeson	4:04
2.	"Promise"	Lifeson, Bill Bell	5:44
3.	"Start Today"	Lifeson	3:48
4.	"Mr. X" (Instrumental)	Lifeson	2:21
5.	"At the End"	Lifeson, Adrian Zivojinovich	6:07
6.	"Sending Out a Warning"	Lifeson, Bell	4:11
7.	"Shut Up Shuttin' Up"	Lifeson, Bell, Charlene, Esther	4:02
8.	"Strip and Go Naked" (Instrumental)	Lifeson, Bell	3:57
9.	"The Big Dance"	Lifeson, Zivojinovich	4:14
10.	"Victor"	Lifeson, W. H. Auden	6:25
11.	"I Am the Spirit"	Lifeson, Bell	5:31

=== Notes ===
"Victor" is based on the poem by W. H. Auden.

== Personnel ==
- Alex Lifeson – spoken vocals (5, 7, 10), guitars, keyboards, bass, mandola, programming, production
- Edwin – lead vocals (1, 2, 6, 9, 11), backing vocals (5)
- Dalbello – lead vocals (3)
- Bill Bell – backing vocals (5), rhythm guitar (2, 6–8, 11)
- Peter Cardinali – bass (4, 7, 10)
- Les Claypool – bass (9)
- Blake Manning – drums (1–7, 9, 11)
- Adrian Zivojinovich - programming (5, 9)
- Colleen Allen – horn (10)

Lifeson's wife Charlene is one of the two women in the track 7 dialogue; the other woman is simply listed as "Esther".

== Singles ==
Information
"Don't Care"
- Released: 1995
- Written by: Alex Lifeson
- Produced by: Alex Lifeson
- Chart positions:
"I Am the Spirit"
- Released:
- Written by: Alex Lifeson and Bill Bell
- Produced by: Alex Lifeson
- Chart positions:
"Promise"
- Released: December 4, 1995
- Written by: Alex Lifeson and Bill Bell
- Produced by: Alex Lifeson
- Chart positions:
