= Whomanfoursays =

Studio album by Dalbello
- Released: 1984
- Recorded: 1984
- Studio: Phase One (Toronto)
- Genres: New wave; art pop
- Length: 42:19
- Label: Capitol
- Producers: Lisa Dalbello; Mick Ronson

Dalbello chronology
| Drastic Measures (1981) | Whomanfoursays (1984) | she (1987) |

Alternative cover
- CD version cover

Professional ratings
Review scores
| Source | Rating |
|---|---|
| AllMusic | 4.5/5 stars |

Whomanfoursays is the fourth studio album by Canadian singer and songwriter Dalbello, and her first concept album.

== Album information ==
Vinyl cover with white logo

Released in 1984 by Capitol Records, the album marked a change in direction in her musical career, away from the soul R&B image of her previous studio albums and toward a more individual and avant-garde sound. Dalbello wrote every track herself, and changed her recording name from Lisa Dal Bello to her last name only. Musician Mick Ronson, who collaborated extensively to the project, produced the album with her; all instruments were played by either or both of them.

The title is a pun on the words "human forces". The original vinyl album cover features in either black or white the name in faux Cyrillic letters; on the CD version, this was replaced with regular uppercase lettering. The typography on the vinyl cover was done, by hand, by Canadian singer-songwriter Mary Margaret O'Hara. Dalbello's face is featured on the cover painted in the style of the indigenous people of New Guinea. The sentence "This album was recorded with the Hughmann technique" was placed in the credits, though it was an invented term, meaning that humans were involved.

Three songs from this album were covered by notable artists : "Gonna Get Close to You" by progressive metal band Queensrÿche on Rage for Order (1986), "Wait for an Answer" by Heart on Bad Animals (1987), and "Animal" by German metal band Heavens Gate on Planet E (1996).

== Track listing ==
All tracks are written by Lisa Dal Bello.

Side one
| No. | Title | Length |
|---|---|---|
| 1. | "Gonna Get Close to You" | 4:29 |
| 2. | "Devious Nature" | 4:01 |
| 3. | "She Pretends" | 4:31 |
| 4. | "Wait for an Answer" | 5:38 |

Side two
| No. | Title | Length |
|---|---|---|
| 1. | "Animal" | 4:01 |
| 2. | "Cardinal Sin" | 4:06 |
| 3. | "Guilty by Association" | 3:34 |
| 4. | "Path of Least Resistance" | 5:56 |
| 5. | "Target (My Eyes Are Aimed at You)" | 6:03 |
| Total length: | | 42:19 |

== Personnel ==
Musicians

- Lisa Dal Bello — lead vocals, keyboards, bass, drums, percussion
- Mick Ronson — guitars, keyboards, bass
- Carole Pope — backing vocals on "Animal"
- John Forbes — Fairlight CMI sampler

== Production ==
- Produced by Mick Ronson and Dalbello
- Engineered by Lenny Derose; additional engineering by Mick Walsh and Kevin Markland
- Mixed by Dalbello, Lenny Derose & Mick Ronson
- Mastered by George Marino
- Deborah Samuel — photography
- Joe Primeur — assistant
- Heather Brown — art direction and design
- Hand lettering by Mary Margaret O'Hara
- All songs published by Dalbello Toonz.

== Chart positions ==
| Chart (1984) | Peak position | Certification | Sales |
|---|---|---|---|
| Canadian Albums Chart | 96 | — | — |
