= Erica Ehm =

Canadian writer and former TV host

- Born: Erica Miechowsky; September 30, 1961 (age 64); Montreal, Quebec, Canada
- Occupations: VJ, radio personality and author
- Spouse: Terry Moshenberg (m. 1999; div. 2023)
- Children: 2

Erica Miechowsky (born September 30, 1961), known professionally as Erica Ehm, is a Canadian writer, actress, songwriter, entrepreneur and TV host. She is best known as a pioneering video jockey at the Canadian cable television station MuchMusic.

== Biography ==
She got her first job at CHOM-FM sorting records for DJs. She began her television career by contributing to Musi-Video, a local rock and video show produced in Montreal, Quebec. She graduated with a Bachelor of Arts degree in Communications from the University of Ottawa.

Ehm moved to Toronto where she found a job working as a receptionist at Citytv, which owned the soon-to-launch cable channel MuchMusic, and when the new station began hiring video jockeys in 1984 she applied and became one of the station's first VJs.

Ehm left MuchMusic in 1994, after ten years, to concentrate on her songwriting career. Since then, she has returned periodically to television, hosting or appearing in shows including Yummy Mummy on Life Network and Discovery Health in the U.S. among other countries, Popstars - The One (Global), Real Life with Erica Ehm (Life Network), Power Play (Discovery Channel Canada), The Company (TVOntario), Nestlé Baby and You (Rogers Cable) and Science: From A to Ehm.

After having a child in 2000 with her then-husband Terry Moshenberg, who founded The League of Rock, and another child in 2003, she runs the Yummy Mummy Club. She has written three stage musicals for the family market. After her first play, Caillou's Big Party, sold out in theatres across North America, she was commissioned to write two other shows, The Big Comfy Couch and Caillou's Big Book Club.

Ehm has written songs which have been recorded by, among others, Van Morrison, Tim Thorney, Cassandra Vasik and Tom Jackson. She has won three Canadian Country Music Awards and three SOCAN Awards. She co-wrote the theme song for the animated film and series Pippi Longstocking. Her song "Love Me Even More" was chosen as the theme for the feature film Some Things That Stay. She had a modest acting career, appearing in Alfred Hitchcock Presents as a secretary, RoboCop: The Series as television news anchor Rocky Crenshaw, as "Benita" in a stage play version of Brad Fraser's Unidentified Human Remains and the True Nature of Love, as a madam in Replikator and as Vicky in Jigsaw.

Ehm authored She Should Talk: Conversations with Exceptional Women about Life, Dreams and Success, published by HarperCollins, as well as a children's book, The Mischievous Mom at the Art Gallery. In 2002, she hosted a weekly call-in show on CFRB 1010, a Toronto news/talk radio station.
