= Tim Thorney =

Canadian guitarist (1955–2021)

- Born: February 4, 1955; Winnipeg, Manitoba, Canada
- Died: June 15, 2021 (aged 66) Collingwood, Ontario, Canada
- Genres: Country, pop
- Occupations: Singer-songwriter, record producer
- Instruments: Vocals, guitar
- Years active: 1981–2021
- Labels: Epic; Perimeter; Thorniac
- Formerly of: The Front

Tim Thorney (February 4, 1955 – June 15, 2021) was a Canadian guitarist, songwriter, and record producer, working out of his studio Villa Sound near Collingwood, Ontario.

== History ==
Thorney first came to prominence as a recording engineer and songwriter. In 1981, he co-wrote most of Lisa Dalbello's Drastic Measures album. In 1983 and 1984, he was a singer, songwriter and keyboard player with The Front, a Canadian studio band that released two albums of pop rock.

In 1995, Tim and his younger brother Tom Thorney were taken on as partners in Great Big Music, which later became Tattoo Music. Through their studio work, the Thorney brothers have won advertising awards for many commercial campaigns in both Canada and the U.S., these awards include a Gemini Award and three Daytime Emmy Awards for the hit show Rolie Polie Olie. They have produced jingles for many high-end clients, including FedEx, Sympatico, 7up and the Ford Motor Company.

In addition to his work in film and television, Tim has worked with many Canadian music artists. Some of these collaborations include producing Vancouver-based hillbilly/punk/folk band Hard Rock Miners' 1992 album The Final Frontier (Einstein Bros./Epic/Sony), co-producing Jimmy Rankin's 2001 album Song Dog and his 2003 album Handmade (he also co-wrote a track with Jimmy), and co-producing Alanis Morissette's 2004 album So-Called Chaos.

In 2008, Thorney produced country artist Alex J. Robinson's debut album, Never Say Never, which featured the hit single "Breakin' on the Love Thing". In 2010, Thorney continued his association with Robinson, on her album, The Getaway. Also in 2010, Thorney was involved in producing singer-songwriter Andrea Ramolo. Albums for both Robinson and Ramolo were released on Thorniac Records, co-owned by Thorney.

On June 15, 2021, Thorney died at his home in Collingwood, Ontario, at the age of 66 following a prolonged period of illness.

== Discography ==
=== The Front ===
- 1983 Gina's at a Party (Duke Street)
- 1984 Underworld

=== Solo ===
- 1993 Some Other Time
- 1999 Extenuating Circus Dances
- 2011 Villa Freud

=== Singles ===
Year	Title	Chart Positions			Album
Year	Title	CAN Country	CAN AC	CAN	Album
1993	"Missing Person"		29	27	Some Other Time
1993	"Fortunate Home"	17			Some Other Time
1994	"Chains" (with Cassandra Vasik)	54			Some Other Time
1994	"All the Things I Do"	38			Some Other Time
