= Buskerfest =

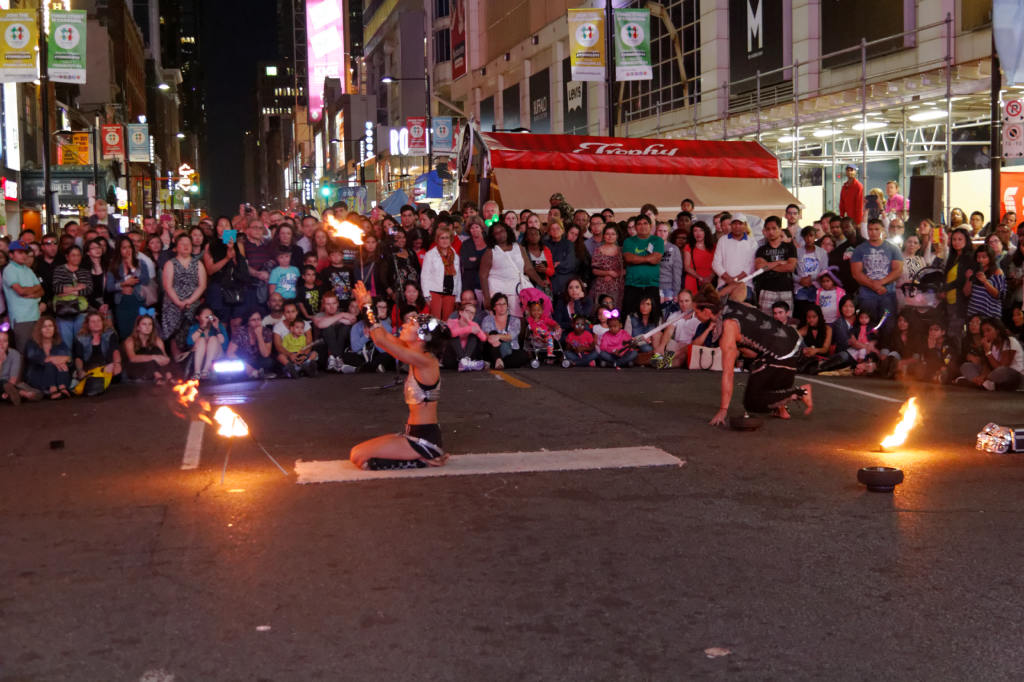
Crowds gather to watch a busker perform on Yonge Street for Toronto's Buskerfest 2014.

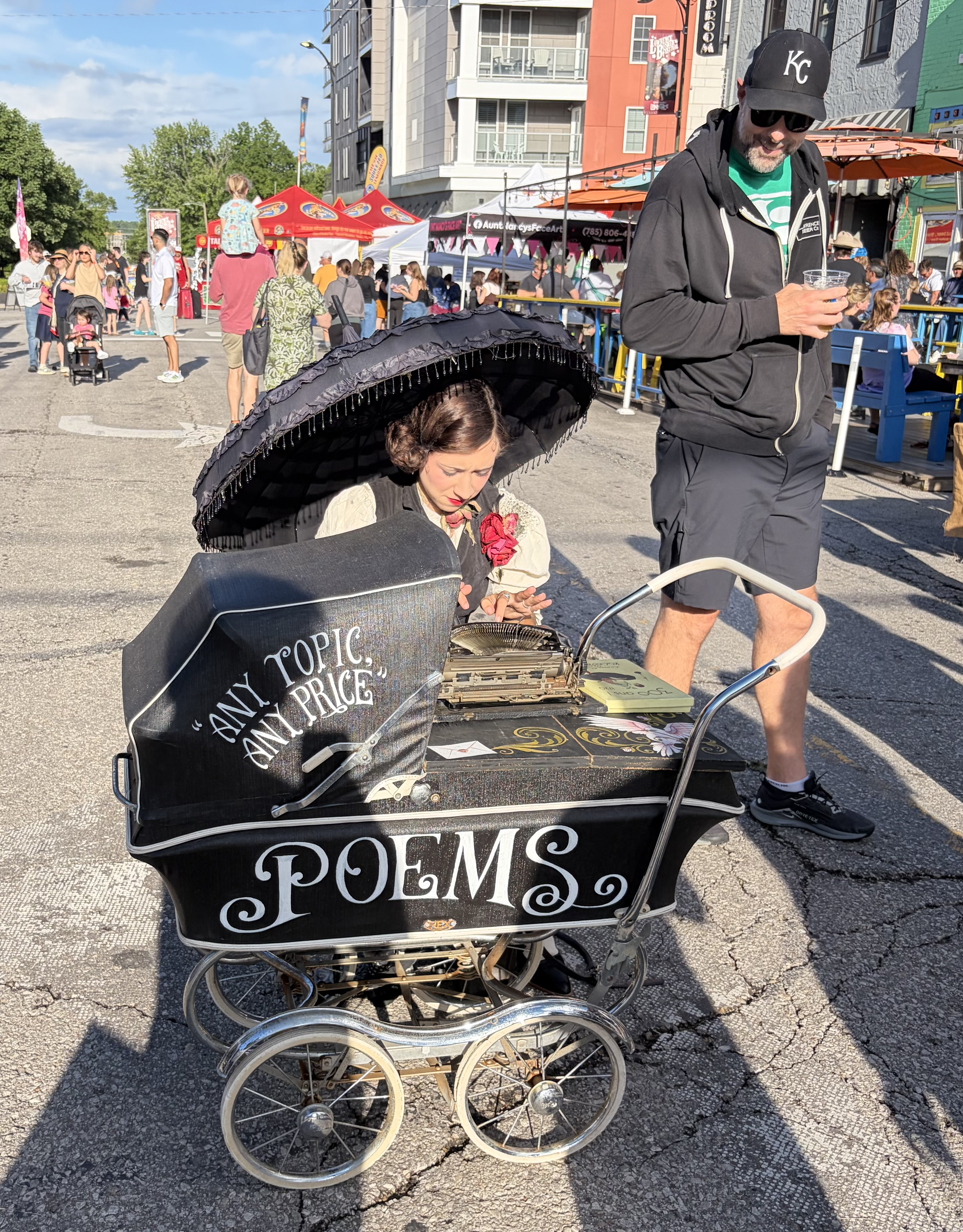
Live poetry at Buskerfest in Lawrence, KS

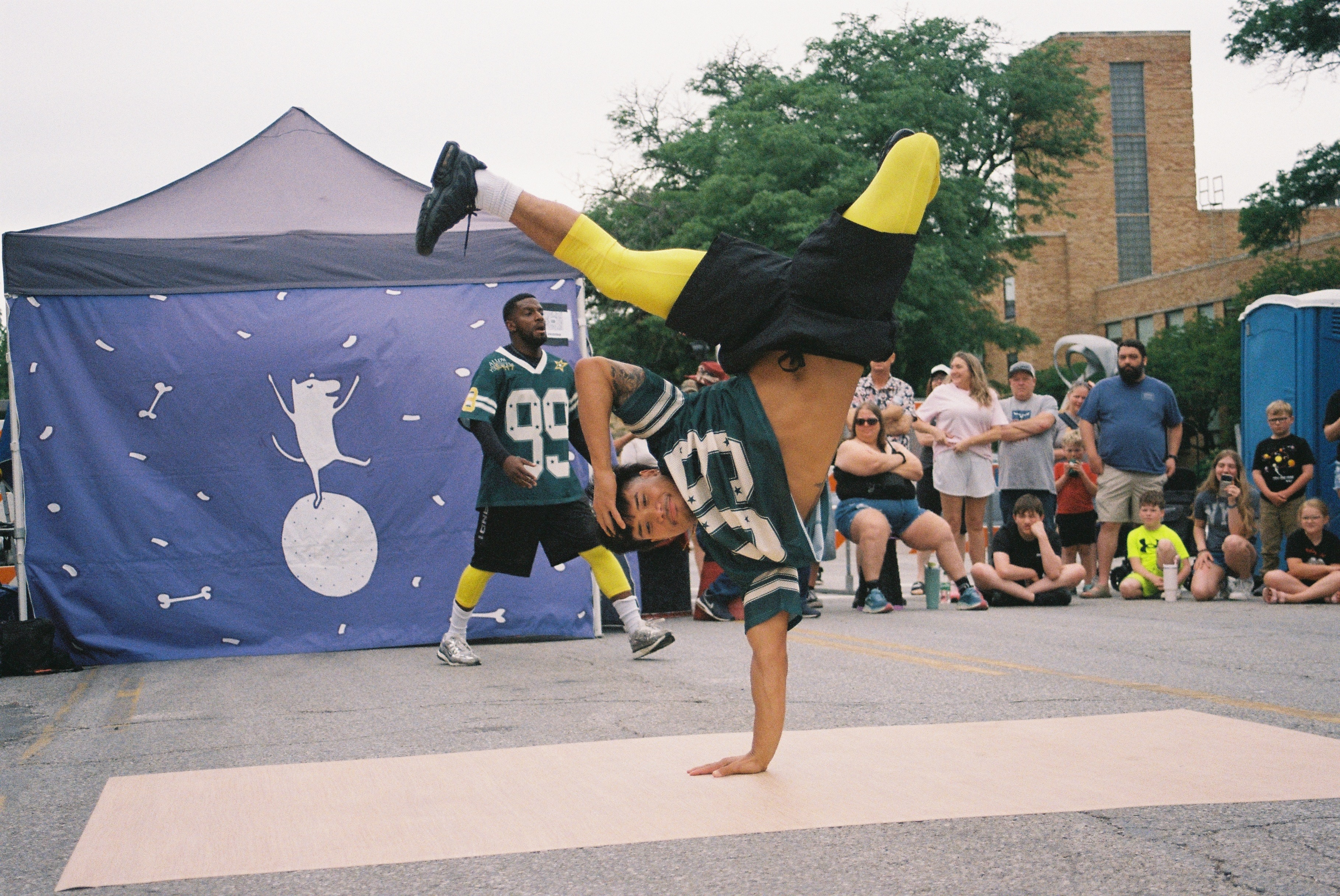
Breakdancing at Lawrence Buskerfest

Buskerfest is the name of a traveling festivals of buskers—street performers. Buskers in the festivals visit a series of host cities each summer. Host cities often shut down one of more blocks of a prominent downtown street for the festival.

host city	years held	notes
Halifax	1986-2020, 2022–	Founded in 1986.; Runs for 6 days during the Natal Day long weekend in July and August.; The 2020 festival was an online three-day event. The 2021 edition was cancelled due to the ongoing pandemic. It resumed the following summer.
Ottawa	1995–2019, 2021–	Unlike other cities Ottawa has a permanent pedestrian mall, and the festival is held there.; Typically held for five days, the first week of August.
Toronto	2000–2019, 2021–	Organized by and as a fundraiser for Epilepsy Toronto.; First hosted in 2000 at Nathan Phillips Square.; In 2013 moved from the St Lawrence Market area to an entire kilometer of Yonge Street where the festival remained for 2014 and 2015; In 2016 moved to Woodbine Park in Toronto's Beach neighbourhood.; Currently runs for four consecutive days, ending on Labour Day.
Lawrence, Kansas	2008–2019, 2021–	Features poets in addition to more traditional buskers.
Long Beach, California	2009–2019, 2021–	Held in early September.; The festival is devoted solely to musical busking.
Abingdon, Virginia	2015–2019, 2021–	First festival to be held over the Labor Day weekend, 2015.
Denver, Colorado	2016-2019, 2021–	Held in early August at Denver Union Station.

== See also ==
- Busking Day
