= Halifax Busker Festival =

Busking / street performance festival held annually in Halifax, Nova Scotia, Canada

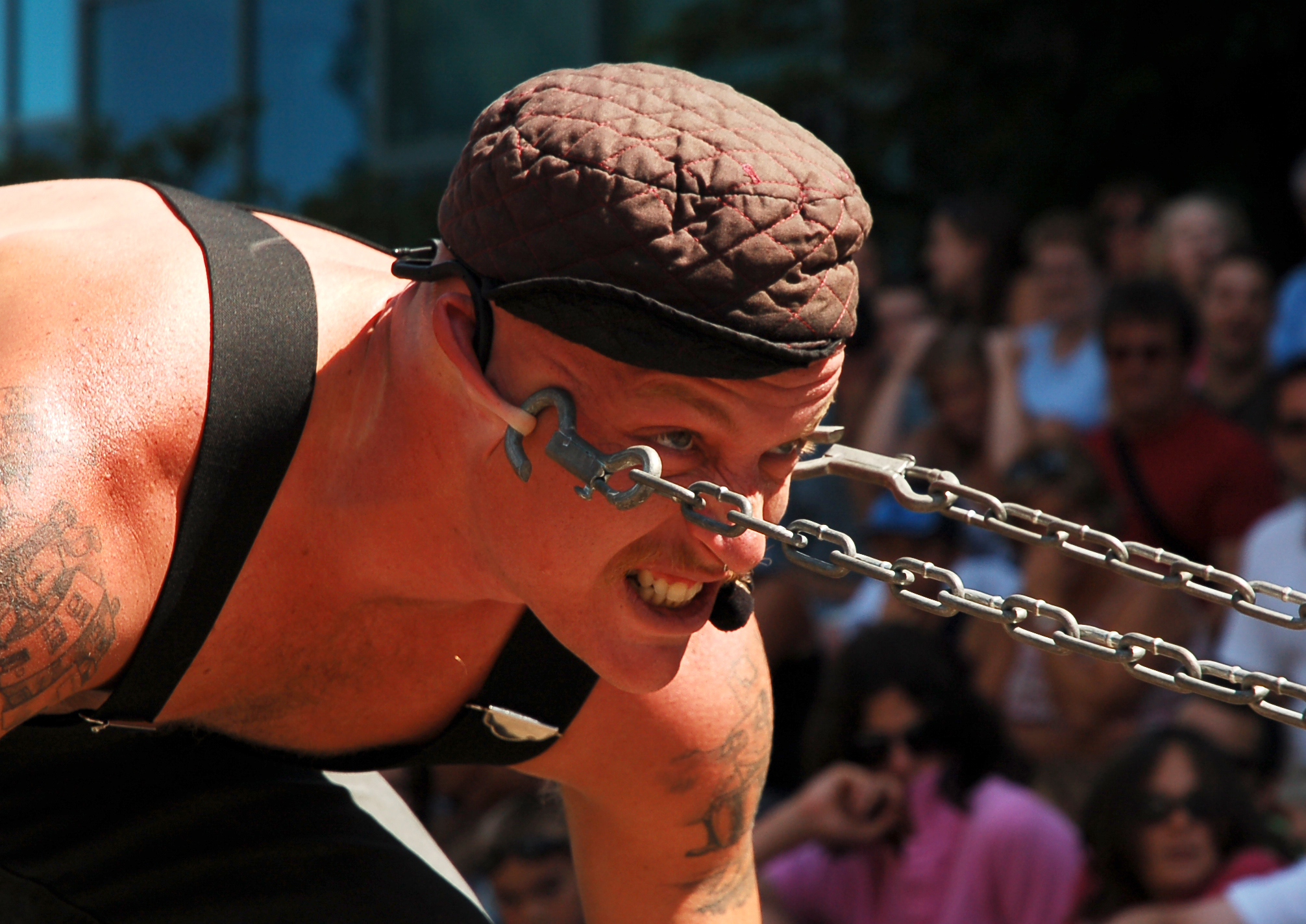
- Masonious Max at the festival in 2007
- Nickname: The Buskers
- Status: Active
- Genre: Street performance
- Date: July-August (6 days)
- Frequency: Annual
- Venue: Halifax Waterfront
- Location: Halifax, Nova Scotia
- Coordinates: 44.64577°N 63.56921°W
- Country: Canada
- Years active: 1986-present
- Website: buskers.ca

The Halifax Busker Festival is an annual event held by Premier Entertainment Group in Halifax, Nova Scotia on the Halifax Waterfront showcasing talent from buskers around the world. The festival runs for 6 days during the Natal Day long weekend in July and August.

== History ==
The festival was founded in 1986.

Admission to the festival is free but audience members are encouraged to tip performers.

In 2020, the event was held entirely online due to the COVID-19 pandemic. It was cancelled in 2021 due to the ongoing pandemic, replaced instead by in-person performances by local musicians and magicians.

The full, live festival resumed in 2022 (when it ran 27 July–1 August), and has continued yearly since, running 2–7 August in 2023, and 31 July–5 August in 2024.

== Gallery ==
Halifax Busker Festival
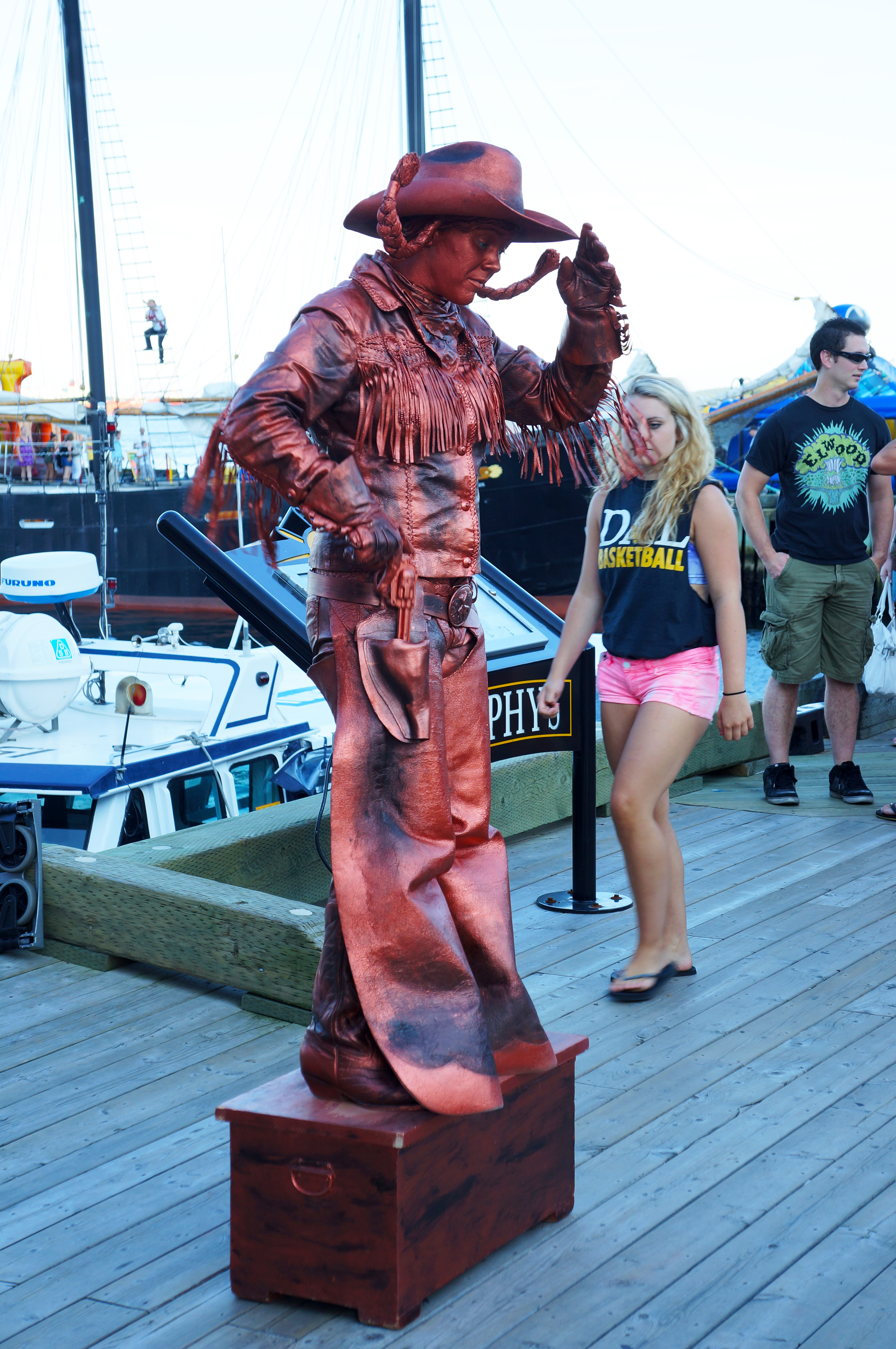
Canadian street performer The Copper Cowgirl (real name Claire Bezuidenhout) performs in Halifax in 2012

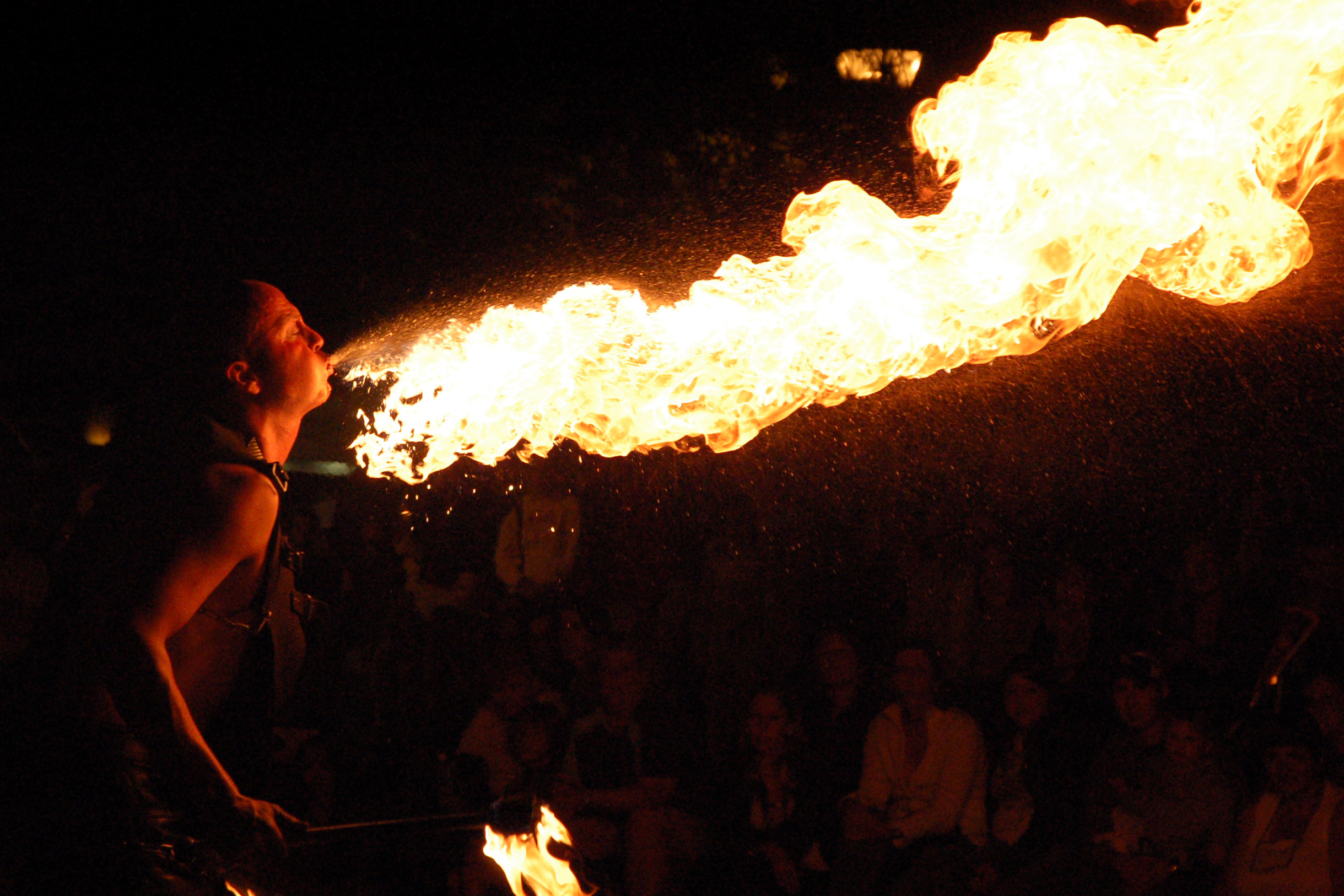
Dutch fire artist Pyromancer at the 2006 festival

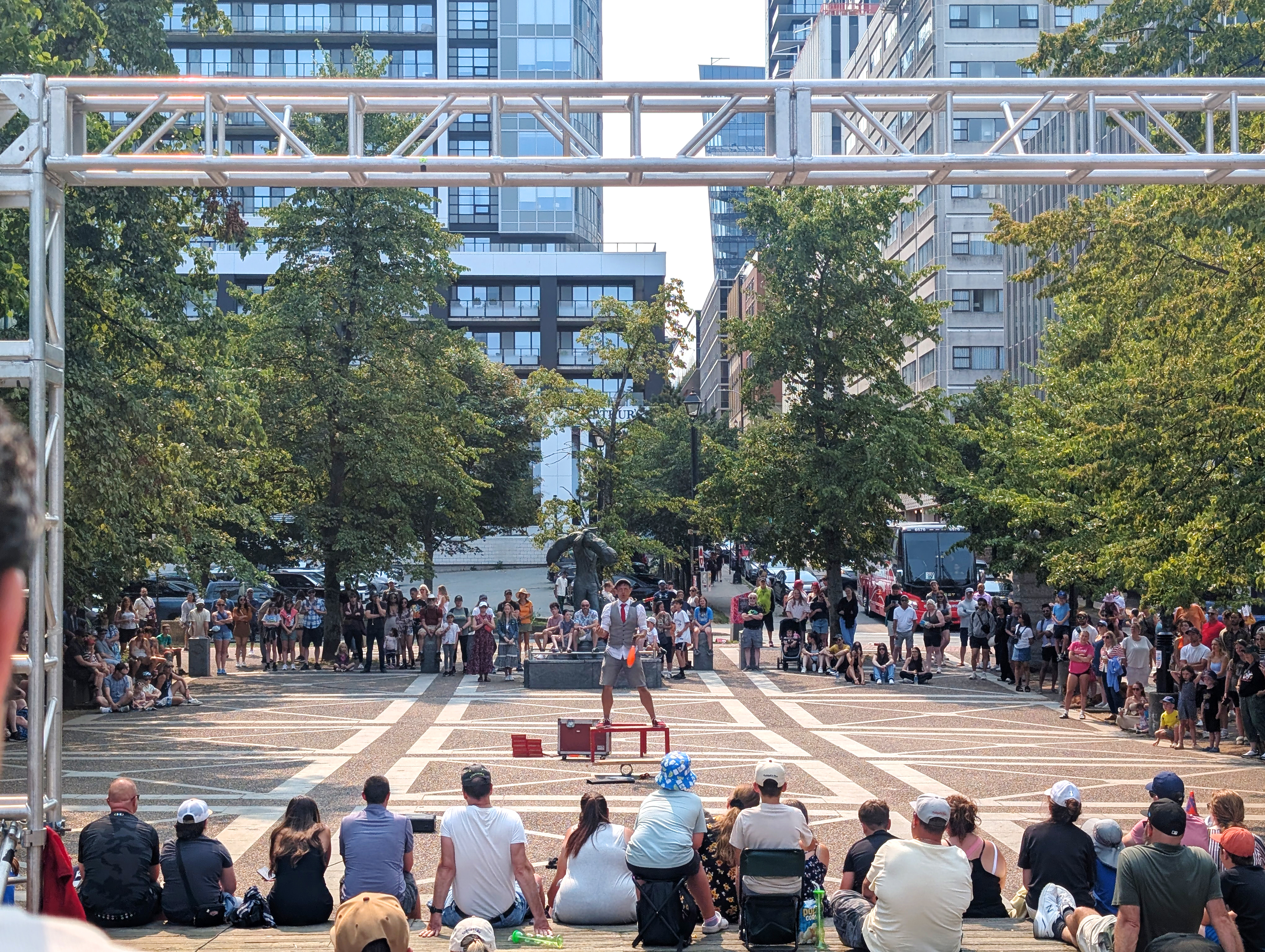
Canadian performer Kobbler Jay juggles at the 2025 festival

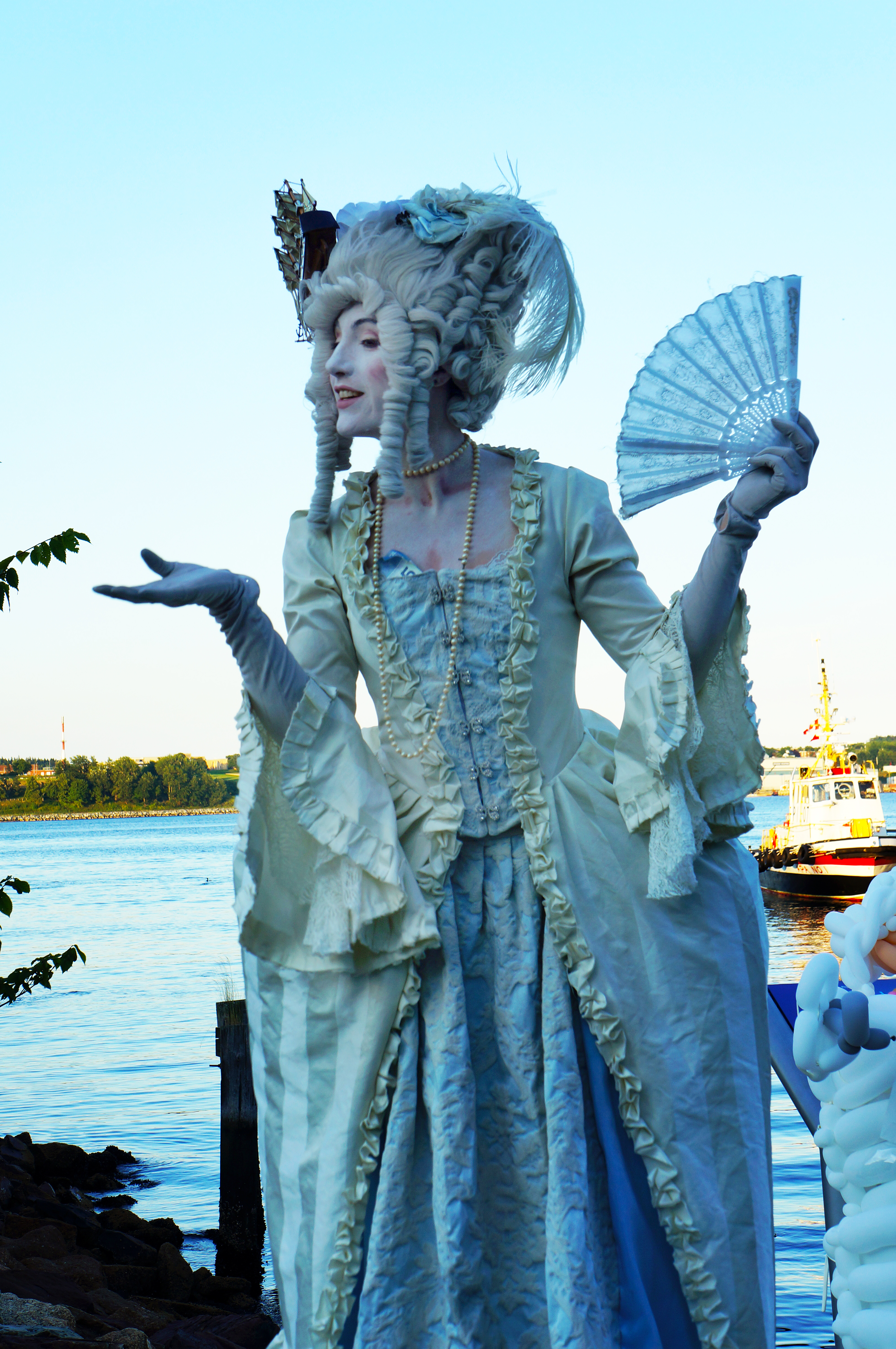
Kate Mior performing as Marie Antoinette in 2012

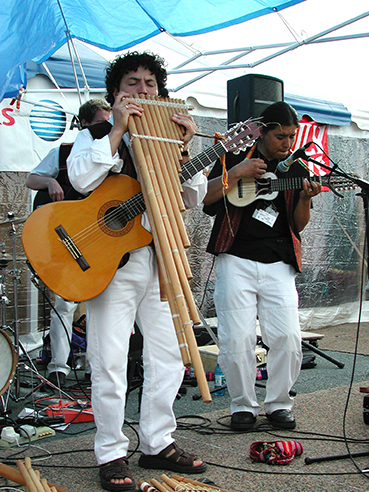
Musicians at the 2002 Busker Festival

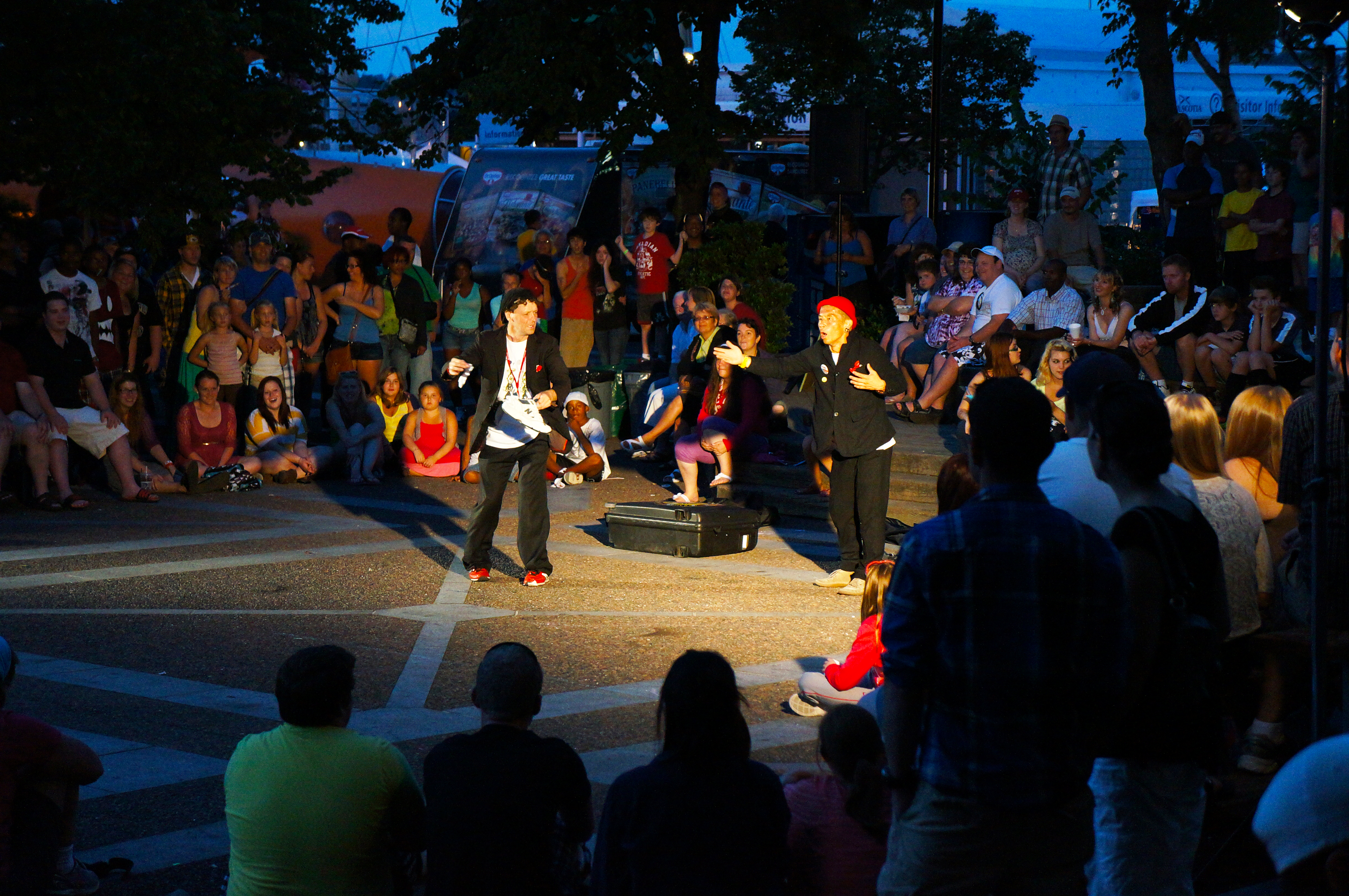
The comedy duo Funny Bones, composed of Chris Peters from the United Kingdom and K-Bow from Japan, performs in Halifax for the 2012 festival

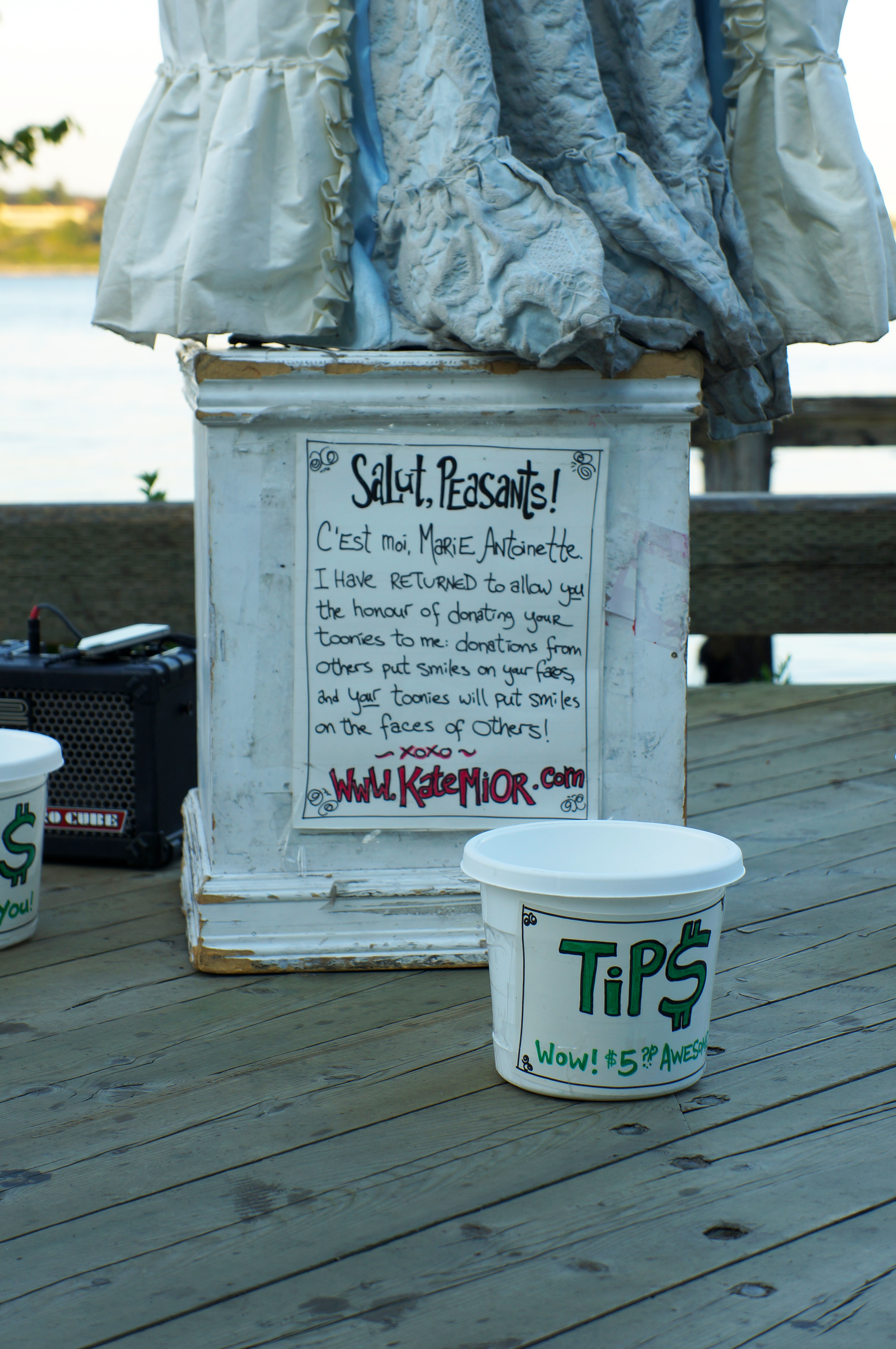
Marie Antoinette and her tip jar
