= Soundgarden discography =

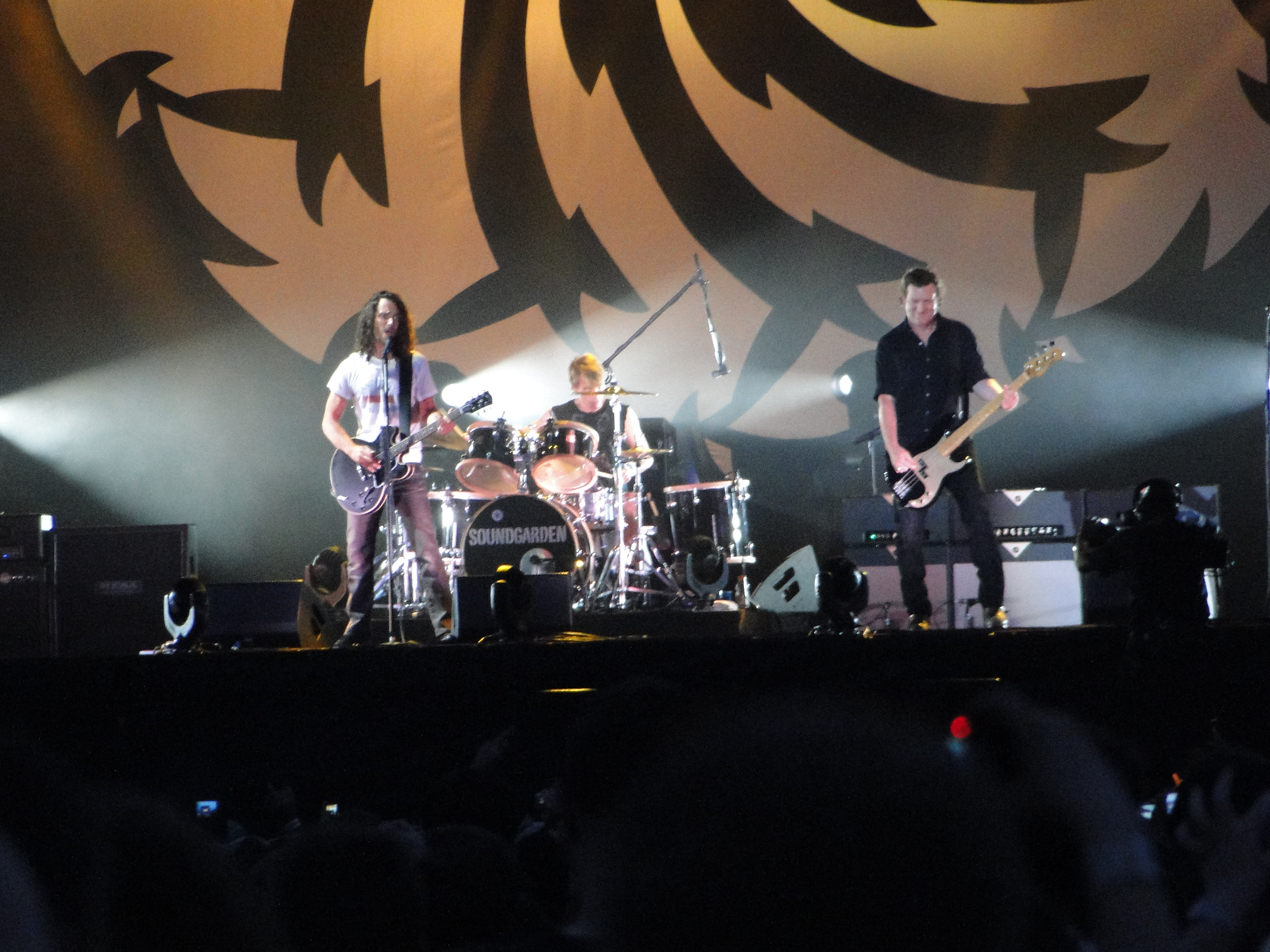
- Soundgarden performing at Lollapalooza in Chicago, 2010; L-R: Chris Cornell, Matt Cameron, and Ben Shepherd. Not pictured: Kim Thayil.
- Studio albums: 6
- Extended plays: 7
- Live albums: 2
- Compilation albums: 6
- Singles: 24
- Video albums: 3
- Music videos: 23

The discography of Soundgarden, an American rock band, consists of six studio albums, two live albums, six compilation albums, seven extended plays, 24 singles and 23 music videos.

Soundgarden was formed in Seattle, Washington in 1984 by vocalist Chris Cornell, guitarist Kim Thayil, and bassist Hiro Yamamoto. The drummer position was originally filled by Cornell until 1986 when Matt Cameron became the band's permanent drummer. The band signed with the independent label Sub Pop and released the Screaming Life EP in 1987 and the Fopp EP in 1988. In 1988, the band signed with legendary punk record label SST Records and released its debut full-length album, Ultramega OK. The band subsequently signed with A&M Records, becoming the first grunge band to sign with a major label. In 1989, the band released its first album for a major label, Louder Than Love.

In 1990, the band was joined by a new bassist, Ben Shepherd. The new line-up released Badmotorfinger in 1991. The album brought the band to a new level of commercial success, and Soundgarden found itself amidst the sudden popularity and attention given to the Seattle music scene. The band's next album was to be its breakthrough. Superunknown, released in 1994, debuted at number one on the Billboard 200 and launched several successful singles, including "Spoonman" and "Black Hole Sun". In 1996, the band released its fifth studio album, Down on the Upside; while successful, the album could not emulate the precedent set by Superunknown. In 1997, the band broke up due to internal strife over its creative direction. Soundgarden has sold 14 million records in the US, and an estimated 30 million worldwide. Cornell announced Soundgarden's reunion on January 1, 2010, The band's first studio album in 16 years, King Animal, was released on November 13, 2012. It debuted and peaked at number five on the Billboard 200.

== Albums ==
=== Studio albums ===
List of studio albums, with selected chart positions and certifications
Title	Album details	Peak chart positions										Certifications
Title	Album details	US	AUS	AUT	CAN	GER	NLD	NOR	NZ	SWE	UK	Certifications
Ultramega OK	Released: October 31, 1988; Label: SST; Formats: CD, CS, LP	—	—	—	—	—	—	—	—	—	—	
Louder Than Love	Released: September 5, 1989; Label: A&M; Formats: CD, CS, LP	108	—	—	—	—	—	—	—	—	—	
Badmotorfinger	Released: October 8, 1991; Label: A&M; Formats: CD, CS, LP	39	27	—	50	—	—	—	16	—	39	RIAA: 2× Platinum; ARIA: Gold; BPI: Gold; MC: Platinum; RMNZ: Platinum
Superunknown	Released: March 8, 1994; Label: A&M; Formats: CD, CS, LP	1	1	19	1	13	11	5	1	3	4	RIAA: 6× Platinum; ARIA: 3× Platinum; BPI: Platinum; IFPI SWE: 2× Platinum; MC: 3× Platinum; NVPI: Gold
Down on the Upside	Released: May 21, 1996; Label: A&M; Formats: CD, CS, LP	2	1	12	2	15	12	6	1	3	7	RIAA: Platinum; ARIA: Platinum; BPI: Silver; MC: Platinum; RMNZ: Platinum
King Animal	Released: November 13, 2012; Label: Seven Four, Republic; Formats: CD, LP, digital download	5	6	19	6	10	24	13	4	25	21	
"—" denotes a recording that did not chart or was not released in that territory.

=== Live albums ===
List of live albums, with selected chart positions
Title	Album details	Peak chart positions				
Title	Album details	US	BEL (FL)	BEL (WA)	SWI	UK
Live on I-5	Released: March 22, 2011; Label: A&M; Formats: CD, LP	47	—	—	—	130
Live from the Artists Den	Released: July 26, 2019; Label: Universal; Formats: CD, LP, digital download, streaming	—	87	77	32	—

=== Compilation albums ===
List of compilation albums, with selected chart positions and certifications
Title	Album details	Peak chart positions										Certifications
Title	Album details	US	AUS	BEL (FL)	BEL (WA)	CAN	GER	NLD	NOR	NZ	UK	Certifications
Screaming Life/Fopp	Released: May 11, 1990; Label: Sub Pop; Formats: CD, CS	—	—	—	—	—	—	—	—	—	—	
Foreshocks	Released: June 28, 1994 (Promo only); Label: A&M; Formats: CD	—	—	—	—	—	—	—	—	—	—	
A-Sides	Released: November 4, 1997; Label: A&M; Formats: CD, CS	63	39	—	—	51	—	—	—	6	90	BPI: Silver
Telephantasm	Released: September 28, 2010; Label: A&M; Formats: CD, LP	24	20	96	76	15	73	97	35	12	83	RIAA: Platinum; BPI: Silver
The Classic Album Selection	Released: May 21, 2012; Label: A&M; Format: CD box set	—	—	149	193	—	—	—	—	—	—	
Echo of Miles: Scattered Tracks Across the Path	Released: November 24, 2014; Label: A&M; Format: CD box set	—	—	—	—	—	—	—	—	—	—	
Essentials	Released: 2019; Label: A&M; Format: CD, digital download	—	—	—	—	—	—	—	—	—	—	
"—" denotes a recording that did not chart or was not released in that territory.

=== Video albums ===
List of video albums
Title	Album details
Louder Than Live	Released: May 22, 1990; Label: A&M; Format: VHS
Motorvision	Released: November 17, 1992; Label: A&M; Format: VHS
Live from the Artists Den	Released: July 26, 2019; Label: Universal; Format: Blu-ray

== Extended plays ==
List of extended plays
Title	EP details
Screaming Life	Released: November 1987; Label: Sub Pop; Formats: CS, 12"
Fopp	Released: August 1988; Label: Sub Pop; Formats: 12"
Loudest Love	Released: October 1990; Label: A&M; Formats: CD
Satanoscillatemymetallicsonatas (SOMMS)	Released: June 23, 1992; Label: A&M; Formats: CD
Songs from the Superunknown	Released: November 21, 1995; Label: A&M; Formats: CD
Before the Doors: Live on I-5 Soundcheck	Released: November 25, 2011; Label: A&M; Formats: 10"
King Animal Demos	Released: April 20, 2013; Label: Republic; Formats: 10"

== Singles ==
=== As lead artist ===
List of singles, with selected chart positions and certifications, showing year released and album name
Title	Year	Peak chart positions										Certifications	Album
Title	Year	US	US Rock	AUS	CAN	GER	NLD	NZ	SCO	SWE	UK	Certifications	Album
"Hunted Down"	1987	—	—	—	—	—	—	—	—	—	—		Screaming Life
"Flower"	1989	—	—	—	—	—	—	—	—	—	—		Ultramega OK
"Loud Love"	1989	—	—	—	—	—	—	—	—	—	87		Louder Than Love
"Hands All Over"	1990	—	—	—	—	—	—	—	—	—	82		Louder Than Love
"Room a Thousand Years Wide"	1990	—	—	—	—	—	—	—	—	—	—		Non-album single (Note: A re-recorded version of the non-album single "Room a Thousand Years Wide" would later appeared on the album Badmotorfinger.)
"Jesus Christ Pose"	1991	—	—	—	—	—	—	—	—	—	30		Badmotorfinger
"Outshined"	1991	—	24	76	—	—	—	—	—	—	50	RMNZ: Gold	Badmotorfinger
"Rusty Cage"	1992	—	—	80	—	—	—	—	—	—	41	RMNZ: Gold	Badmotorfinger
"Spoonman"	1994	—	18	23	12	—	37	10	96	37	20	RMNZ: Gold	Superunknown
"The Day I Tried to Live"	1994	—	— (Note: "The Day I Tried to Live" did not enter the US Hot Rock & Alternative Songs chart, but peaked at number 13 on the US Mainstream Rock Airplay chart.)	—	—	—	—	—	—	—	42	RMNZ: Gold	Superunknown
"Black Hole Sun"	1994	— (Note: "Black Hole Sun" did not enter the Billboard Hot 100, but peaked at number 24 on the US Radio Songs chart.)	5	6	5	26	25	22	11	19	12	ARIA: Gold; BPI: Platinum; RMNZ: 3× Platinum	Superunknown
"My Wave"	1994	—	— (Note: "My Wave" did not enter the US Hot Rock & Alternative Songs chart, but peaked at number 11 on the US Mainstream Rock Airplay chart.)	50	66	—	—	46	—	—	—		Superunknown
"Fell on Black Days"	1994	— (Note: "Fell on Black Days" did not enter the Billboard Hot 100, but peaked at number 54 on the US Radio Songs chart.)	14	52	66	—	45	—	27	—	24	RMNZ: Platinum	Superunknown
"Pretty Noose"	1996	— (Note: "Pretty Noose" did not enter the Billboard Hot 100, but peaked at number 37 on the US Radio Songs chart.)	— (Note: "Pretty Noose" did not enter the US Hot Rock & Alternative Songs chart, but peaked at number four on the US Mainstream Rock Airplay chart.)	22	43	—	—	18	36	42	14		Down on the Upside
"Burden in My Hand"	1996	— (Note: "Burden in My Hand" did not enter the Billboard Hot 100, but peaked at number 40 on the US Radio Songs chart.)	— (Note: "Burden in My Hand" did not enter the US Hot Rock & Alternative Songs chart, but peaked at number one on the US Mainstream Rock Airplay chart.)	57	9	—	—	—	30	—	33	RMNZ: Gold	Down on the Upside
"Blow Up the Outside World"	1996	— (Note: "Blow Up the Outside World" did not enter the Billboard Hot 100, but peaked at number 53 on the US Radio Songs chart.)	— (Note: "Blow Up the Outside World" did not enter the US Hot Rock & Alternative Songs chart, but peaked at number one on the US Mainstream Rock Airplay chart.)	76	89	—	—	—	40	—	40		Down on the Upside
"Ty Cobb"	1997	—	—	—	—	—	—	—	—	—	—		Down on the Upside
"Bleed Together"	1997	—	— (Note: "Bleed Together" did not enter the US Hot Rock & Alternative Songs chart, but peaked at number 13 on the US Mainstream Rock Airplay chart.)	—	—	—	—	—	—	—	—		A-Sides
"Black Rain"	2010	96	14	90	44	—	—	—	97	—	109		Telephantasm
"The Telephantasm"	2010	— (Note: "The Telephantasm" did not enter the Billboard Hot 100, but peaked at number 9 on the Hot Singles Sales chart.)	—	—	—	—	—	—	—	—	—		Telephantasm
"Live to Rise"	2012	— (Note: "Live to Rise" did not enter the Billboard Hot 100, but peaked at number 10 on the Bubbling Under Hot 100 Singles chart.)	4	—	69	—	—	—	—	—	—		Avengers Assemble
"Been Away Too Long"	2012	—	17	—	93	—	—	—	—	—	—		King Animal
"By Crooked Steps"	2013	—	— (Note: "By Crooked Steps" did not enter the US Hot Rock & Alternative Songs chart, but peaked at number 17 on the US Rock & Alternative Airplay chart.)	—	—	—	—	—	—	—	—		King Animal
"—" denotes a recording that did not chart or was not released in that territory.

=== Promotional singles ===
List of songs, with selected chart positions, showing year released and album name
Title	Year	Peak chart positions				Album
Title	Year	US Act. Rock	US Herit. Rock	US Main. Rock	US Rock Air.	Album
"Get on the Snake"	1989	—	—	—	—	Louder Than Love
"Rhinosaur"	1997	18	36	19	—	Down on the Upside
"Halfway There"	2013	13	8	12	33	King Animal
"—" denotes a recording that did not chart or was not released in that territory.

== Music videos ==
List of music videos, showing year released and director
Title	Year	Director(s)	Album
"Flower"	1988	Mark Miremont	Ultramega OK
"Loud Love"	1989	Kevin Kerslake	Louder Than Love
"Hands All Over"	1990	Kevin Kerslake	Louder Than Love
"Jesus Christ Pose"	1991	Eric Zimmerman	Badmotorfinger
"Outshined" (version 1)	1991	Matt Mahurin	Badmotorfinger
"Outshined" (version 2)	1991	Kevin Kerslake	Badmotorfinger
"Rusty Cage"	1992	Eric Zimmerman	Badmotorfinger
"Spoonman"	1994	Jeffrey Plansker	Superunknown
"The Day I Tried to Live"	1994	Matt Mahurin	Superunknown
"Black Hole Sun"	1994	Howard Greenhalgh	Superunknown
"My Wave"	1994	Henry Shepherd	Superunknown
"Fell on Black Days"	1994	Jake Scott	Superunknown
"Superunknown"	1995	Numillennia	Superunknown
"Pretty Noose" (version 1)	1996	Frank Kozik	Down On The Upside
"Pretty Noose" (version 2)	1996	Henry Shepherd	Down On The Upside
"Burden in My Hand"	1996	Jake Scott	Down On The Upside
"Blow Up the Outside World"	1996	Gerald Casale	Down On The Upside
"Get on the Snake" (Live)	2010	—N/a	Telephantasm
"Black Rain"	2010	Brendon Small	Telephantasm
"Live to Rise"	2012	Robert Hales	Avengers Assemble
"Been Away Too Long"	2012	Josh Graham	King Animal
"By Crooked Steps"	2013	Dave Grohl	King Animal
"Halfway There"	2013	Josh Graham	King Animal

== Other appearances ==
Year	Song	Album	Label
1986	"Heretic" "Tears to Forget" "All Your Lies"	Deep Six	C/Z
1988	"Sub Pop Rock City"	Sub Pop 200	Sub Pop
1990	"Ugly Truth" (live)	New Music Awards	College Media, Inc.
1990	"Fresh Deadly Roses"	Pave the Earth	A&M
1992	"Birth Ritual"	Singles: Original Motion Picture Soundtrack	Epic
1993	"Show Me"	No Alternative	Arista
1993	"HIV Baby"	Born to Choose	Rykodisc
1994	"New Damage" (with Brian May)	Alternative NRG	Hollywood
1995	"Blind Dogs"	The Basketball Diaries soundtrack	Island
1996	"Kyle Petty, Son of Richard"	Home Alive: The Art of Self-Defense	Epic
2012	"Live to Rise"	Avengers Assemble	Hollywood, Marvel Music
