= List of songs recorded by Soundgarden =

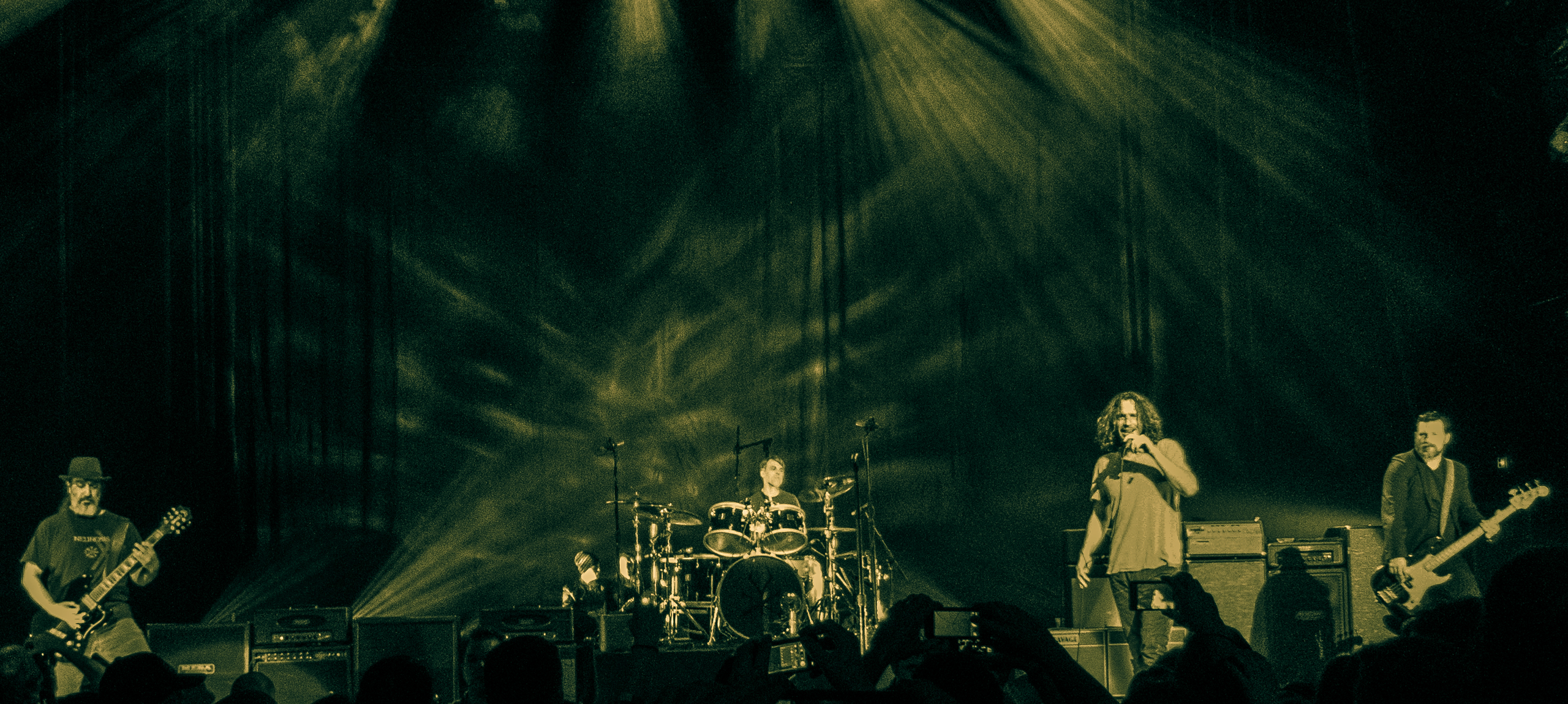
Left to right: Kim Thayil, Matt Cameron, Chris Cornell and Ben Shepherd.

A list of songs recorded by American rock band Soundgarden.

== List ==
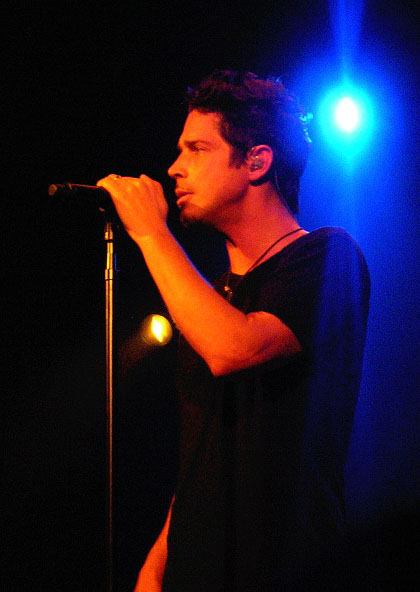
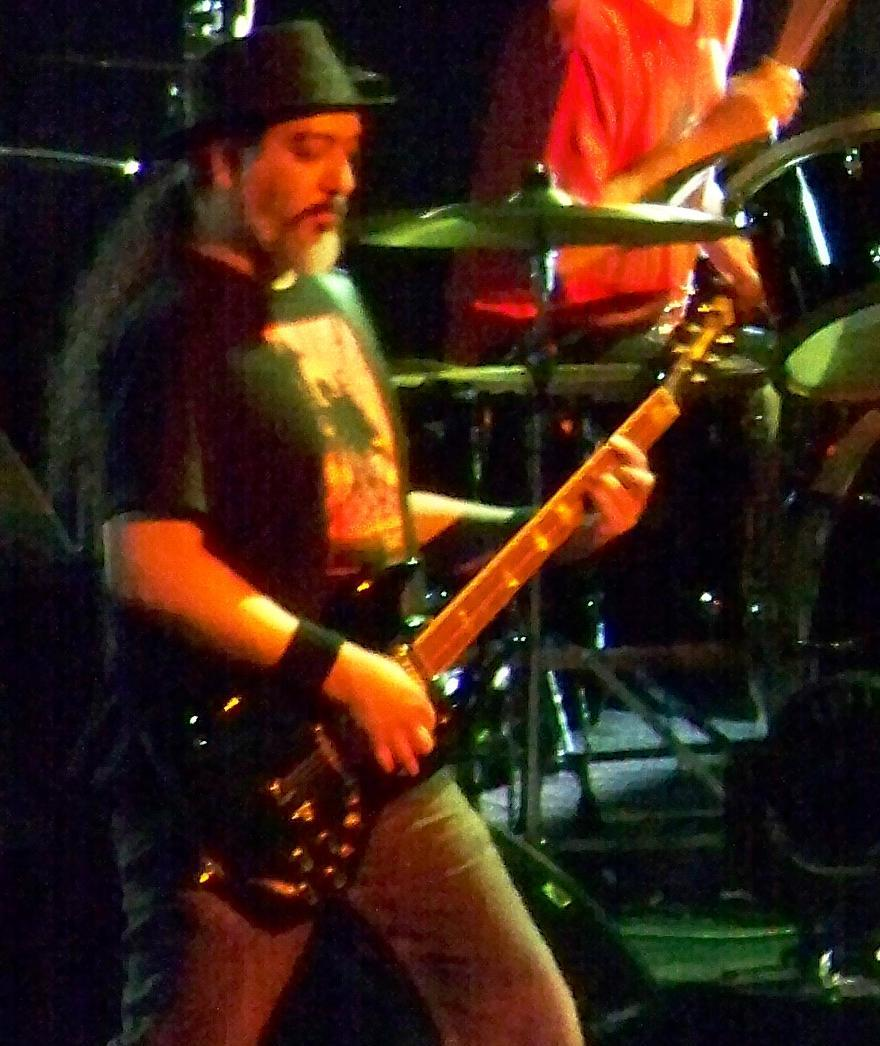
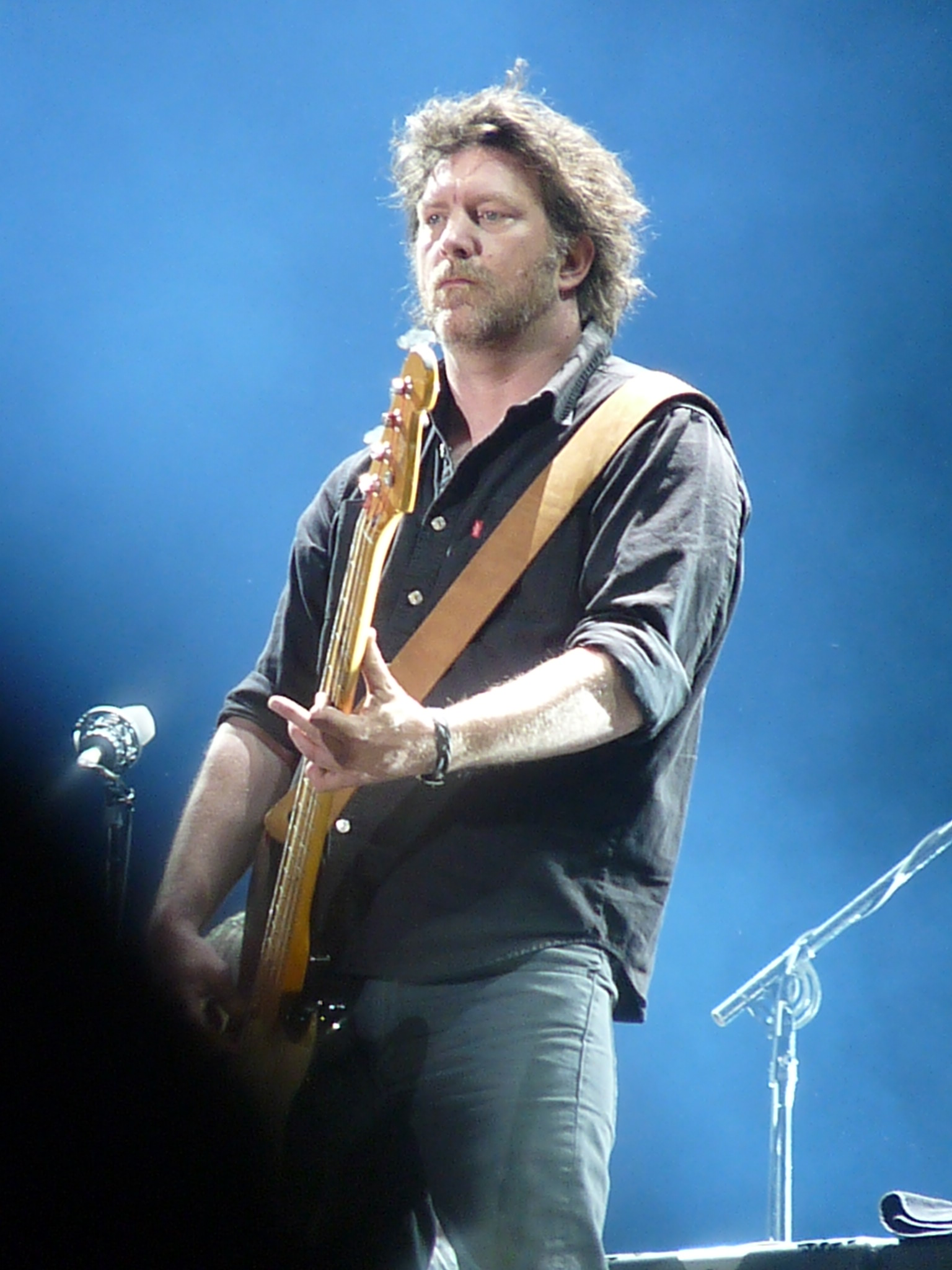
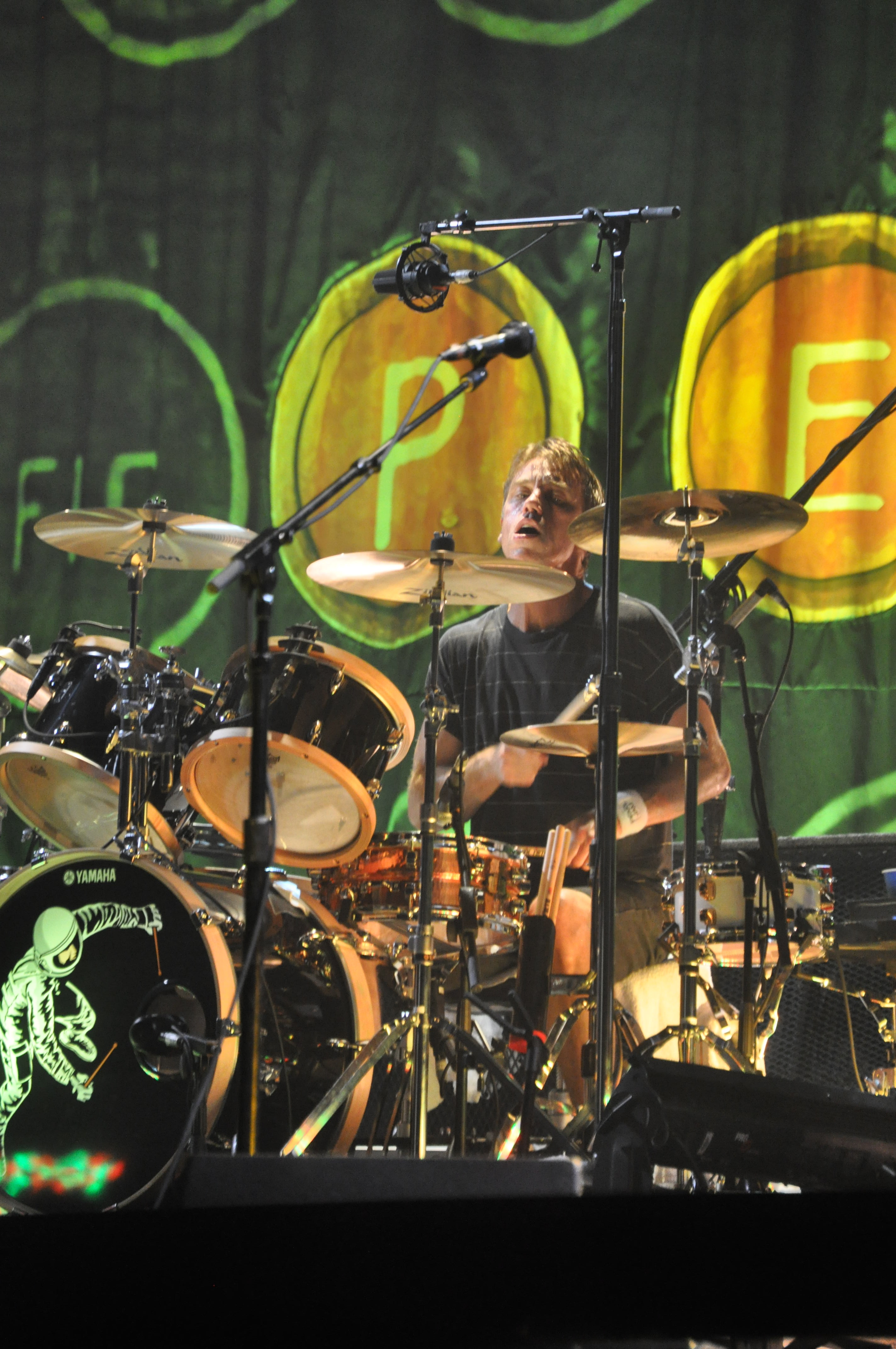
All members of Soundgarden contributed to songwriting, including singer Chris Cornell, guitarist Kim Thayil (top), bassist Ben Shepherd (middle) and drummer Matt Cameron (bottom).
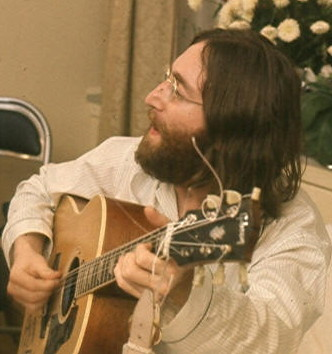
Soundgarden's debut full-length album Ultramega OK features cover versions of Howlin' Wolf's "Smokestack Lightning" and John Lennon's "Two Minutes Silence" (under the title "One Minute of Silence").

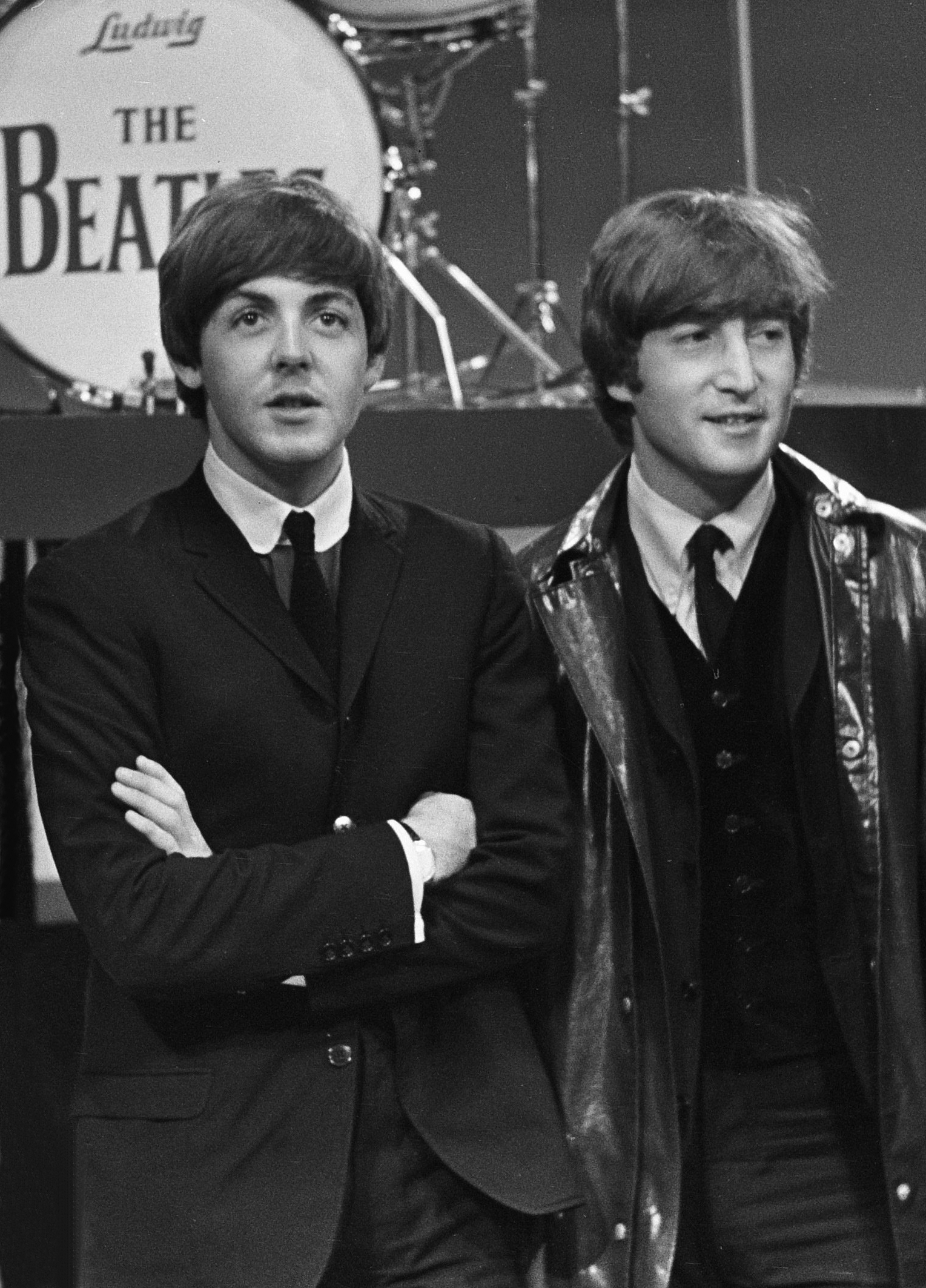
Soundgarden released a recording of The Beatles song "Come Together", written by John Lennon and Paul McCartney, as a B-side to "Hands All Over" in 1990.

Key
†	Indicates song released as a single
‡	Indicates song written solely by Cornell

Name of song, writer(s), original release, and year of release.
Title	Writer(s)	Release	Year	Ref.
"4th of July"	Chris Cornell ‡	Superunknown	1994	
"665"	Hiro Yamamoto; Chris Cornell	Ultramega OK	1988	
"667"	Hiro Yamamoto; Chris Cornell	Ultramega OK	1988	
"All Your Lies"	Chris Cornell; Kim Thayil; Hiro Yamamoto	Deep Six	1986	
"An Unkind"	Ben Shepherd	Down on the Upside	1996	
"Applebite"	Chris Cornell; Matt Cameron	Down on the Upside	1996	
"Attrition"	Ben Shepherd	King Animal	2012	
"Been Away Too Long" †	Chris Cornell; Ben Shepherd	King Animal	2012	
"Beyond the Wheel"	Chris Cornell ‡	Ultramega OK	1988	
"Big Dumb Sex"	Chris Cornell ‡	Louder Than Love	1989	
"Birth Ritual"	Chris Cornell; Kim Thayil; Matt Cameron	Singles	1992	
"Black Hole Sun" †	Chris Cornell ‡	Superunknown	1994	
"Black Rain" †	Chris Cornell; Kim Thayil; Ben Shepherd	Telephantasm	2010	
"Black Saturday"	Chris Cornell ‡	King Animal	2012	
"Bleed Together" †	Chris Cornell ‡	"Burden in My Hand"	1996	
"Blind Dogs"	Chris Cornell; Kim Thayil	The Basketball Diaries	1995	
"Blood on the Valley Floor"	Chris Cornell; Kim Thayil	King Animal	2012	
"Blow Up the Outside World" †	Chris Cornell ‡	Down on the Upside	1996	
"Bones of Birds"	Chris Cornell ‡	King Animal	2012	
"Boot Camp"	Chris Cornell ‡	Down on the Upside	1996	
"Burden in My Hand" †	Chris Cornell ‡	Down on the Upside	1996	
"By Crooked Steps" †	Kim Thayil; Ben Shepherd; Matt Cameron	King Animal	2012	
"Circle of Power"	Kim Thayil; Hiro Yamamoto	Ultramega OK	1988	
"Cold Bitch"	Chris Cornell ‡	"Outshined"	1991	
"Come Together" (Note: "Come Together" and "Drive My Car" were originally recorded by The Beatles.) (Note: "Come Together", "Fresh Deadly Roses" and "Heretic" were also later released on the 1990 EP Loudest Love.)	John Lennon; Paul McCartney	"Hands All Over"	1989	
"The Day I Tried to Live" †	Chris Cornell ‡	Superunknown	1994	
"Drawing Flies"	Chris Cornell; Matt Cameron	Badmotorfinger	1991	
"Dusty"	Chris Cornell; Ben Shepherd	Down on the Upside	1996	
"Entering"	Chris Cornell; Kim Thayil	Screaming Life	1987	
"Exit Stonehenge"	Chris Cornell; Kim Thayil; Ben Shepherd; Matt Cameron	"Spoonman"	1994	
"Eyelid's Mouth"	Chris Cornell; Matt Cameron	King Animal	2012	
"Face Pollution"	Chris Cornell; Ben Shepherd	Badmotorfinger	1991	
"Fell on Black Days" †	Chris Cornell ‡	Superunknown	1994	
"Flower" †	Kim Thayil; Chris Cornell	Ultramega OK	1988	
"Fopp" (Note: "Fopp" was originally recorded by Ohio Players.)	Billy Beck; Leroy Bonner; Marshall Jones; Ralph Middlebrooks; Mervin Pierce; Clarence Satchell; James Williams	Fopp	1988	
"Fresh Deadly Roses"	Chris Cornell ‡	"Loud Love"	1989	
"Fresh Tendrils"	Chris Cornell; Matt Cameron	Superunknown	1994	
"Full On (Reprise)"	Chris Cornell ‡	Louder Than Love	1989	
"Full on Kevin's Mom"	Chris Cornell ‡	Louder Than Love	1989	
"Get on the Snake"	Kim Thayil; Chris Cornell	Louder Than Love	1989	
"Girl U Want" (Note: "Girl U Want" was originally recorded by Devo.) (Note: "Girl U Want", "Into the Void (Sealth)", "She's a Politician" and "Stray Cat Blues" were later also released on the bonus disc of the 1992 reissue of Badmotorfinger entitled Satanoscillatemymetallicsonatas (SOMMS).)	Mark Mothersbaugh; Gerald Casale	"Outshined"	1991	
"Gun"	Chris Cornell ‡	Louder Than Love	1989	
"H.I.V. Baby"	Chris Cornell; Kim Thayil; Ben Shepherd	"Room a Thousand Years Wide"	1990	
"Half"	Ben Shepherd	Superunknown	1994	
"Halfway There" †	Chris Cornell ‡	King Animal	2012	
"Hand of God"	Chris Cornell; Kim Thayil	Screaming Life	1987	
"Hands All Over" †	Kim Thayil; Chris Cornell	Louder Than Love	1989	
"He Didn't"	Matt Cameron; Chris Cornell	Ultramega OK	1988	
"Head Down"	Ben Shepherd	Superunknown	1994	
"Head Injury"	Chris Cornell ‡	Ultramega OK	1988	
"Heretic"	Kim Thayil; Hiro Yamamoto	Deep Six	1986	
"Holy Water"	Chris Cornell ‡	Badmotorfinger	1991	
"Hunted Down" †	Chris Cornell; Kim Thayil	Screaming Life	1987	
"I Awake"	Hiro Yamamoto; Kate McDonald	Louder Than Love	1989	
"Incessant Mace"	Kim Thayil; Chris Cornell	Ultramega OK	1988	
"Into the Void (Sealth)" (Note: "Into the Void" was originally recorded by Black Sabbath.)	Tony Iommi; Ozzy Osbourne; Geezer Butler; Bill Ward	"Jesus Christ Pose"	1991	
"Jerry Garcia's Finger"	Chris Cornell ‡	Songs from the Superunknown	1995	
"Jesus Christ Pose" †	Chris Cornell; Kim Thayil; Ben Shepherd; Matt Cameron	Badmotorfinger	1991	
"Karaoke"	Chris Cornell ‡	"Burden in My Hand"	1996	
"Kickstand"	Chris Cornell; Kim Thayil	Superunknown	1994	
"Kingdom of Come"	Chris Cornell ‡	Fopp	1988	
"Kristi"	Chris Cornell; Kim Thayil	Echo of Miles: Scattered; Tracks Across the Path	2014	
"Kyle Petty, Son of Richard"	Chris Cornell; Kim Thayil	"Fell on Black Days"	1994	
"Let Me Drown"	Chris Cornell ‡	Superunknown	1994	
"Like Suicide"	Chris Cornell ‡	Superunknown	1994	
"Limo Wreck"	Chris Cornell; Kim Thayil; Matt Cameron	Superunknown	1994	
"Little Joe"	Chris Cornell; Kim Thayil	Screaming Life	1987	
"Live to Rise" †	Chris Cornell ‡	Avengers Assemble	2012	
"Loud Love" †	Chris Cornell ‡	Louder Than Love	1989	
"Mailman"	Chris Cornell; Matt Cameron	Superunknown	1994	
"Mind Riot"	Chris Cornell ‡	Badmotorfinger	1991	
"Mood for Trouble"	Chris Cornell ‡	Ultramega OK	1988	
"Motorcycle Loop" (Note: "Motorcycle Loop" is also known as "Ghostmotorfinger".)	Kim Thayil	"Fell on Black Days"	1994	
"My Wave" (Note: "My Wave" is also known as "Keep It Off My Wave".) †	Chris Cornell; Kim Thayil	Superunknown	1994	
"Nazi Driver"	Hiro Yamamoto; Chris Cornell	Ultramega OK	1988	
"Never Named"	Chris Cornell; Ben Shepherd	Down on the Upside	1996	
"Never the Machine Forever"	Kim Thayil	Down on the Upside	1996	
"New Damage"	Chris Cornell; Kim Thayil; Matt Cameron	Badmotorfinger	1991	
"Night Surf"	Ben Shepherd	Echo of Miles: Scattered; Tracks Across the Path	2014	
"No Attention"	Chris Cornell ‡	Down on the Upside	1996	
"No Wrong, No Right"	Hiro Yamamoto; Chris Cornell	Louder Than Love	1989	
"Non-State Actor"	Chris Cornell; Kim Thayil; Ben Shepherd	King Animal	2012	
"Nothing to Say"	Chris Cornell; Kim Thayil; Hiro Yamamoto; Matt Cameron	Screaming Life	1987	
"One Minute of Silence" (Note: "One Minute of Silence" was originally recorded by John Lennon and Yoko Ono under the title "Two Minutes Silence".)	John Lennon	Ultramega OK	1988	
"Outshined" †	Chris Cornell ‡	Badmotorfinger	1991	
"Overfloater"	Chris Cornell ‡	Down on the Upside	1996	
"Power Trip"	Hiro Yamamoto; Chris Cornell	Louder Than Love	1989	
"Pretty Noose" †	Chris Cornell ‡	Down on the Upside	1996	
"Rhinosaur" †	Chris Cornell; Matt Cameron	Down on the Upside	1996	
"Room a Thousand Years Wide" (Note: "Room a Thousand Years Wide" was also later released on Badmotorfinger.) †	Kim Thayil; Matt Cameron	"Room a Thousand Years Wide"	1990	
"Rowing"	Chris Cornell; Ben Shepherd	King Animal	2012	
"Rusty Cage" †	Chris Cornell ‡	Badmotorfinger	1991	
"Searching with My Good Eye Closed"	Chris Cornell ‡	Badmotorfinger	1991	
"She Likes Surprises"	Chris Cornell ‡	Superunknown	1994	
"She's a Politician"	Chris Cornell ‡	Split with Rights of the Accused	1991	
"Show Me"	Ben Shepherd	"Outshined"	1991	
"Slaves & Bulldozers"	Chris Cornell; Ben Shepherd	Badmotorfinger	1991	
"Smokestack Lightning" (Note: "Smokestack Lightning" was originally recorded by Howlin' Wolf.)	Chester Burnett	Ultramega OK	1988	
"Somewhere"	Ben Shepherd	Badmotorfinger	1991	
"A Splice of Space Jam"	Chris Cornell; Kim Thayil; Ben Shepherd; Matt Cameron	"Blow Up the Outside World"	1996	
"Spoonman" †	Chris Cornell ‡	Superunknown	1994	
"Storm"	Chris Cornell; Kim Thayil	Echo of Miles: Scattered; Tracks Across the Path	2014	
"Stray Cat Blues" (Note: "Stray Cat Blues" was originally recorded by The Rolling Stones.)	Mick Jagger; Keith Richards	"Jesus Christ Pose"	1991	
"Sub Pop Rock City"	Chris Cornell; Kim Thayil; Hiro Yamamoto; Matt Cameron	Sub Pop 200	1988	
"Superunknown"	Chris Cornell; Kim Thayil	Superunknown	1994	
"Swallow My Pride" (Note: "Swallow My Pride" was originally recorded by Green River.)	Steve Turner; Mark Arm	Fopp	1988	
"Switch Opens"	Chris Cornell; Ben Shepherd	Down on the Upside	1996	
"Taree"	Chris Cornell; Ben Shepherd	King Animal	2012	
"Tears to Forget"	Chris Cornell; Kim Thayil; Hiro Yamamoto	Deep Six	1986	
"The Telephantasm" †	Kim Thayil	Telephantasm	2010	
"A Thousand Days Before"	Chris Cornell; Kim Thayil	King Animal	2012	
"Tighter & Tighter"	Chris Cornell ‡	Down on the Upside	1996	
"Touch Me" (Note: "Touch Me" was originally recorded by Fancy.)	Mike Hurst; Ray Fenwick	"Rusty Cage"	1992	
"Toy Box"	Kim Thayil; Hiro Yamamoto	"Flower"	1989	
"Twin Tower"	Matt Cameron	Echo of Miles: Scattered; Tracks Across the Path	2014	
"Ty Cobb" †	Chris Cornell; Ben Shepherd	Down on the Upside	1996	
"Ugly Truth"	Chris Cornell ‡	Louder Than Love	1989	
"Uncovered"	Chris Cornell ‡	Louder Than Love	1989	
"Worse Dreams"	Chris Cornell ‡	King Animal	2012	
"Zero Chance"	Chris Cornell; Ben Shepherd	Down on the Upside	1996	
