= Echo of Miles: Scattered Tracks Across the Path =

2014 compilation album by Soundgarden

Compilation album by Soundgarden
- Released: November 24, 2014
- Recorded: 1987–2014
- Genres: Alternative metal; sludge metal; grunge; psychedelic rock
- Length: 210:53
- Label: A&M

Soundgarden chronology
King Animal (2012)	Echo of Miles: Scattered Tracks Across the Path (2014)

Professional ratings
Review scores
Source	Rating
AllMusic	3.5/5 stars

Echo of Miles: Scattered Tracks Across the Path is a compilation album by Soundgarden, an American rock band. It was released on November 24, 2014. The album is a collection of rarities, live tracks, and unreleased material spanning the group's history. It includes previously released songs, such as "Live to Rise", "Black Rain", and "Birth Ritual", and a new rendition of a song from the band's pre–Matt Cameron 1985 demo, "The Storm", now titled "Storm", which was produced by Jack Endino.

Although the album is almost comprehensive, there are some notable absentees from this compilation: "Incessant Mace" from 1986's Pyrrhic Victory compilation cassette (with Chris Cornell on drums), "Heretic" and "Tears to Forget" from 1986's Deep Six compilation (with Scott Sundquist on drums), (Note: "All Your Lies" from this compilation was previously released on 2010's Telephantasm.) and a re-recording of "New Damage" featuring Brian May from 1993's Alternative NRG compilation.

Kim Thayil has also mentioned in past interviews that there are more unreleased tracks that still have not seen the light of day. None of these tracks are on Echo of Miles, despite the fact that Thayil has expressed that he wanted to release a B-sides compilation featuring these tracks. Deluxe editions of the band's studio albums Ultramega OK, Badmotorfinger, and Superunknown were released between 2014 and 2017. All three contained demo rehearsals, remixes, alternate versions, or outtakes, some of which did not appear on Echo of Miles.

== Track listing ==
All lyrics are written by Chris Cornell, except where noted.

Disc one – Originals
No.	Title	Lyrics	Music	Original album	Length
1.	"Sub Pop Rock City"		Kim Thayil	Sub Pop 200, 1988	3:15
2.	"Toy Box"	Hiro Yamamoto, Thayil	Yamamoto	"Flower" single B-side, 1989	5:42
3.	"Heretic"	Yamamoto	Thayil	"Hands All Over" single B-side and the Loudest Love EP, 1990	3:50
4.	"Fresh Deadly Roses"		Cornell	"Loud Love" single B-side, 1989; Loudest Love EP, 1990	4:51
5.	"HIV Baby"		Ben Shepherd, Thayil	"Room a Thousand Years Wide" single B-side, 1990; Born to Choose, 1993	4:51
6.	"Cold Bitch"		Cornell	"Outshined" single B-side, 1991; "Spoonman" single B-side, 1994	4:59
7.	"Show Me"	Shepherd	Shepherd	"Rusty Cage" single B-side, 1992; No Alternative, 1993	2:46
8.	"She's a Politician"		Cornell	Satanoscillatemymetallicsonatas EP, 1992; "Burden in My Hand" single B-side, 1996	1:46
9.	"Birth Ritual"		Matt Cameron, Cornell, Thayil	Singles: Original Motion Picture Soundtrack, 1992	6:03
10.	"She Likes Surprises"		Cornell	International version of Superunknown, 1994; Songs from the Superunknown EP, 1995	3:18
11.	"Kyle Petty, Son of Richard"		Thayil	"Fell on Black Days" single B-side, 1994; Home Alive: The Art of Self Defense, 1996	4:04
12.	"Exit Stonehenge"		Cameron, Cornell, Shepherd, Thayil	"Spoonman" single B-side, 1994	1:19
13.	"Blind Dogs"		Thayil	The Basketball Diaries soundtrack, 1995	4:40
14.	"Bleed Together"		Cornell	"Burden in My Hand" single B-side, 1996; A-Sides, 1997	3:53
15.	"Black Rain"		Thayil, Shepherd	Telephantasm, 2010	5:25
16.	"Live to Rise"		Cornell	The Avengers soundtrack, 2012	4:40
17.	"Kristi"		Thayil	Previously unreleased, recorded 1995	5:32
18.	"Storm" (Previously unreleased, recorded 2014)		Cornell, Thayil		5:25
Total length:					77:00

Disc two – Covers
No.	Title	Writer(s)	Original album	Length
1.	"Swallow My Pride" (Green River cover)	Mark Arm, Steve Turner	Fopp EP, 1988	2:22
2.	"Smokestack Lightning" (Howlin' Wolf cover)	Chester Burnett	Ultramega OK, 1988	5:10
3.	"Everybody's Got Something to Hide Except Me and My Monkey (John Peel Sessions)" (The Beatles cover)	Lennon–McCartney	Previously unreleased, recorded 1989	2:27
4.	"Thank You (Falettinme Be Mice Elf Agin) (John Peel Sessions)" (Sly and the Family Stone cover)	Sly Stone	Previously unreleased, recorded 1989	5:07
5.	"Come Together" (The Beatles cover)	Lennon–McCartney	"Hands All Over" single B-side; Loudest Love EP, 1990	5:54
6.	"Stray Cat Blues" (The Rolling Stones cover)	Jagger–Richards	Satanoscillatemymetallicsonatas EP, 1992; "Jesus Christ Pose" single B-side, 1991	4:41
7.	"Into the Void (Sealth)" (Black Sabbath cover)	Geezer Butler, Tony Iommi, Ozzy Osbourne, Bill Ward; Chief Sealth (lyrics)	Satanoscillatemymetallicsonatas EP, 1992 & "Jesus Christ Pose" single B-side, 1991	6:38
8.	"Girl U Want" (Devo cover)	Gerald Casale	Satanoscillatemymetallicsonatas EP, 1992 & "Fell on Black Days" single B-side, 1995	3:30
9.	"Touch Me" (Fancy cover)	Ray Fenwick, Mike Hurst	"Rusty Cage" single B-side, 1991	2:51
10.	"Can You See Me? (Friday Rock Show BBC Sessions)" (The Jimi Hendrix Experience cover)	Jimi Hendrix	"Outshined" single B-side, 1992	2:41
11.	"Homicidal Suicidal (Friday Rock Show BBC Sessions)" (Budgie cover)	John Shelley	"Outshined" single B-side, 1992	4:24
12.	"I Can't Give You Anything (Friday Rock Show BBC Sessions)" (Ramones cover)	The Ramones	"Outshined" single B-side, 1992	2:17
13.	"I Don't Care About You (Friday Rock Show BBC Sessions)" (Fear cover)	Lee Ving	"Outshined" single B-side, 1992	1:55
14.	"Waiting for the Sun (Live)" (The Doors cover)	John Densmore, Ray Manzarek, Jim Morrison, Robby Krieger	Before the Doors: Live on I-5 Soundcheck EP, 2011	4:31
15.	"Search and Destroy (Live)" (The Stooges cover)	Iggy Pop, James Williamson	Live on I-5, 2011	3:13
16.	"Big Bottom (Live)" (Spinal Tap cover)	Christopher Guest, Harry Shearer, Michael McKean, Rob Reiner	Louder Than Live, 1990; "Rusty Cage" single B-side, 1991	4:53
17.	"Earache My Eye (Live)" (Cheech & Chong cover)	Cheech Marin, Gaye Delorme, Thomas Chong	Louder than Live, 1990 & "Rusty Cage" single B-side, 1991	5:47
Total length:				68:29

Disc three – Oddities
No.	Title	Lyrics	Music	Original album	Length
1.	"Twin Tower"	(Instrumental)	Matt Cameron	Previously unreleased, recorded 1988	3:21
2.	"Jerry Garcia's Finger"	(Instrumental)	Cameron, Chris Cornell, Ben Shepherd, Kim Thayil	Songs from the Superunknown EP, 1995; "Pretty Noose" single B-side, 1996	3:25
3.	"Ghostmotorfinger"	(Instrumental)	Thayil	"Fell on Black Days" single B-side, 1995 (as "Motorcycle Loop")	1:33
4.	"Night Surf"	(Instrumental)	Ben Shepherd	Previously unreleased, recorded 1993	5:23
5.	"A Splice of Space Jam"	(Instrumental)	Cameron, Cornell, Shepherd, Thayil	"Blow Up the Outside World" single B-side, 1996	4:06
6.	"The Telephantasm"	(Instrumental)	Thayil	Telephantasm iTunes bonus track, 2010	2:59
7.	"Black Days III"	Cornell	Cornell	"Fell on Black Days" single B-side, 1995 (as "Fell on Black Days (Demo version)")	4:03
8.	"Karaoke"	Cornell	Cornell	"Burden in My Hand" single B-side, 1996	6:00
9.	"Fopp (Fucked Up Heavy dub mix)"	William Bec, Leroy Bonner, Marshall Jones, Ralph Middlebrooks, Marvin Pierce, Clarence Satchell, James Williams	Bec, Bonner, Jones, Middlebrooks, Pierce, Satchell, Williams	Fopp EP, 1988	6:28
10.	"Big Dumb Sex (Dub version)"	Cornell	Cornell	"Loud Love" single B-side, 1989 & Loudest Love EP, 1990	6:10
11.	"Spoonman (Steve Fisk remix)"	Cornell	Cornell	"Black Hole Sun" single B-side, 1994	6:58
12.	"Rhinosaur (The Straw That Broke the Rhino's Back remix)"	Cornell	Cameron	"Ty Cobb" single B-side, 1997	3:43
13.	"Dusty (Moby remix)"	Cornell	Shepherd	"Blow Up the Outside World" single B-side, 1996	5:09
14.	"The Telephantasm (Resurrection remix)"	(Instrumental)	Thayil	Previously unreleased, remixed 2010	4:55
15.	"One Minute of Silence"	(Instrumental)	John Lennon	Ultramega OK, 1988	1:04
Total length:					65:24

All lyrics are written by Chris Cornell, except where noted.

The Originals (Single Disc version)
No.	Title	Lyrics	Music	Original album	Length
1.	"Heretic"	Hiro Yamamoto	Kim Thayil	"Hands All Over" single B-side & the Loudest Love EP, 1990	3:50
2.	"Fresh Deadly Roses"		Cornell	"Loud Love" single B-side, 1989 & Loudest Love EP, 1990	4:51
3.	"HIV Baby"		Ben Shepherd, Thayil	"Room a Thousand Years Wide" single B-side, 1990; Born to Choose, 1993	4:51
4.	"Cold Bitch"		Cornell	"Spoonman" single B-side, 1994	4:59
5.	"Show Me"	Shepherd	Shepherd	"Rusty Cage" single B-side, 1991 & No Alternative, 1993	2:46
6.	"She's a Politician"		Cornell	Satanoscillatemymetallicsonatas EP, 1992 & "Burden in My Hand" single B-side, 1996	1:46
7.	"Birth Ritual"		Matt Cameron, Cornell, Thayil	Singles: Original Motion Picture Soundtrack, 1992 & Telephantasm, 2010	6:03
8.	"She Likes Surprises"		Cornell	International version of Superunknown, 1994 & Songs from the Superunknown EP, 1995	3:18
9.	"Blind Dogs"		Thayil	The Basketball Diaries soundtrack, 1995	4:40
10.	"Bleed"		Cornell	"Burden in My Hand" single B-side, 1996 & A-Sides, 1997	3:53
11.	"Black Rain"		Thayil, Shepherd	Telephantasm, 2010	5:24
12.	"Live to Rise"		Cornell	The Avengers soundtrack, 2012	4:40
13.	"Kristi"		Thayil	Previously unreleased, recorded 1995	5:32
14.	"Storm"		Cornell, Thayil	Previously unreleased, recorded 2014	5:25

== Personnel ==
Soundgarden

- Chris Cornell – lead vocals, rhythm guitar
- Kim Thayil – lead guitar
- Ben Shepherd – bass (Originals: 5–18; Covers: 6–15; Oddities: 2–5, 7, 8, 11–13)
- Matt Cameron – drums
- Hiro Yamamoto – bass (Originals: 1–4; Covers: 1–4; Oddities: 1, 6, 9, 10, 14)
- Jason Everman – bass (Covers: 5, 16, 17)

Additional musicians

- Stephanie (Barber) Fairweather – lead vocals on track 9 (Covers)

== Charts ==
Chart (2014–15)	Peak position
Spanish Albums (Promusicae)	71
Swiss Albums (Schweizer Hitparade)	86
US Top Hard Rock Albums (Billboard)	12
US Top Rock Albums (Billboard)	49
