= 6 Songs for Bruce =

Soundgarden demo cassette tape

Demo album by Soundgarden
- Recorded: April 24, 1985
- Genre: Grunge
- Language: English
- Producer: Jack Endino

6 Songs for Bruce, also commonly known as the 4-Track Demo, is an early single-sided demo cassette tape by American rock band Soundgarden.

== Overview ==
The band, at the time a three-piece named Sound Garden, composed of guitarist Kim Thayil, bassist Hiro Yamamoto, and Chris Cornell on drums and vocals, recorded the demo, in Jack Endino's basement four-track studio (Note: "... I already knew Soundgarden pretty well, since they and Skin Yard had shared the stage many times in Seattle's tiny club scene circa 1985-1986. ... I had a basement 4-track setup and had done some demos for them and others..." – Jack Endino, Seattle 2013) on April 24, 1985, for their friend Bruce Pavitt, hence the name of the tape, which features a rare early version of "Tears to Forget" sung by Yamamoto, and, as a bonus song, a Cornell's solo recording titled "The Storm". The side B of the cassette, humorously titled Zen Deity Speaks, contains no recordings. (Note: This blank track ostensibly makes tribute, in a joking way, to 4′33″, the 1952 experimental silent composition by John Cage (who was highly influenced by Zen Buddhism); as previously John Lennon and Yoko Ono did through the piece "Two Minutes Silence", from their 1969 album Unfinished Music No. 2: Life with the Lions; which in turn, Soundgarden would parodied as "One Minute of Silence" on their 1988's Ultramega OK album.)

The demo tape was among many of the artifacts displayed at the Museum of Pop Culture's Nirvana: Taking Punk to the Masses exhibit in Seattle, Washington.

6 Songs for Bruce would be the second demo of Soundgarden; which was preceded by a tape titled The First 15, recorded in 1984.

== Reissues and re-recordings ==
"Tears to Forget" would be re-recorded in late 1985, with Cornell on vocals and Scott Sundquist on drums, for the C/Z Records compilation album Deep Six released in 1986. It was recorded for a third time in 1987, with Matt Cameron on drums, for the band's debut EP Screaming Life. (Note: Sub Pop #SP 12)

"The Storm" would be laid down for a second time, during a March 1986 session, on a 16-track demo tape that got shelved. 28 years later, again with Endino as producer, the tune would be re-recorded in finished form in May 2014. Retitled as simply "Storm", it was released on the band's rarities box set Echo of Miles: Scattered Tracks Across the Path. (Note: A&M #B0022156-02)

"Incessant Mace" was reissued on the 1986 C/Z Records limited edition cassette-only various artists compilation Pyrrhic Victory. In 1988, the song would be re-recorded, with Cameron on drums, for its release on the band's first full-length album Ultramega OK. (Note: SST #SST 201) In 2017, two previously unreleased eight-track versions of "Incessant Mace", taken from a demo tape, informally called the "Ultramega EP" by the band members, produced in 1987 by Endino and Chris Hanzsek at Seattle's Reciprocal Recording studio, were included on the expanded remixed and remastered reissue of Ultramega OK. (Note: Sub Pop #SP1172)

== Track listing ==
All lyrics are written by Chris Cornell, except where noted; all music is composed by Cornell, Kim Thayil, and Hiro Yamamoto, except where noted.

Side A: 6 Songs for Bruce
No.	Title	Music	Artist	Length
1.	"I Think I'm Sinking"
2.	"Bury My Head In Sand"
3.	"Tears to Forget"	Thayil, Yamamoto
4.	"The Storm" (bonus track)	Cornell, Thayil	Chris Cornell
5.	"Incessant Mace"	Thayil
6.	"In Vention"
7.	"Out of My Skin"

Side B: Zen Deity Speaks (blank side)
No.	Title	Length

== Personnel ==
Sound Garden

- Chris Cornell – lead vocals, drums, all instruments on "The Storm"
- Kim Thayil – guitar
- Hiro Yamamoto – bass, lead vocals on "Tears to Forget"

Production

- Jack Endino – production
