= Screaming Life/Fopp =

Compilation album by Soundgarden
- Released: May 11, 1990
- Recorded: 1987 (Reciprocal); 1988 (Moore Theatre)
- Venue: Moore Theatre (Seattle)
- Studio: Reciprocal (Seattle)
- Genres: Grunge; alternative metal
- Length: 37:15
- Label: Sub Pop
- Producers: Jack Endino; Steve Fisk; Soundgarden

Soundgarden compilations chronology
Screaming Life/Fopp (1990)	A-Sides (1997)

Screaming Life/Fopp is a compilation album by the American rock band Soundgarden that combines their debut EPs in their entirety into a single release. It was originally released on May 11, 1990, through Sub Pop Records. Sub Pop later remastered and reissued the album on November 24, 2013.

== Overview ==
The album combines the band's first two studio EPs: Screaming Life (1987) and Fopp (1988). It was released in 1990 by Sub Pop despite having been recorded in 1987–88, after Soundgarden's two subsequent full-length releases, Ultramega OK (1988) and Louder than Love (1989), had gained them considerable popularity. There are two cover songs on the album; "Swallow My Pride" is a Green River cover and "Fopp" is an Ohio Players cover.

The 2013 re-issue contains an extra track, "Sub Pop Rock City", that is not present on the original release. "Sub Pop Rock City" was a track recorded during the same pre-Ultramega OK era but previously only available on the Sub Pop 200 compilation.

== Release and reception ==
Professional ratings
Review scores
Source	Rating
AllMusic	3/5 stars
Consequence of Sound	C+
PopMatters	6/10
Rolling Stone	2.5/5 stars

PopMatters journalist J.C. Maçek III reviewed the 2013 remastered version of the album and said, "As for the 'remastering' aspect, to be sure, the album sounds as good as it ever has, especially to those of us who memorized every note by way of audio cassettes. However, the new version doesn't sound markedly different from the previous release on CD, mostly because the songs were recorded tough and rough in the first place."

== Track listing ==
All lyrics written by Chris Cornell, all music composed by Kim Thayil, except where noted.

=== Original release ===
No.	Title	Lyrics	Music	Length
1.	"Hunted Down"			2:42
2.	"Entering"			4:36
3.	"Tears to Forget"		Hiro Yamamoto, Thayil	2:00
4.	"Nothing to Say"			4:00
5.	"Little Joe"			4:31
6.	"Hand of God"		Yamamoto	4:27
7.	"Kingdom of Come"		Chris Cornell	2:35
8.	"Swallow My Pride"	Mark Arm	Steve Turner	2:18
9.	"Fopp"	Billy Beck, Leroy Bonner, Marshall Jones, Ralph Middlebrooks, Marvin Pierce, Clarence Satchell, James Williams	Billy Beck, Leroy Bonner, Marshall Jones, Ralph Middlebrooks, Marvin Pierce, Clarence Satchell, James Williams	3:37
10.	"Fopp (Fucked Up Heavy dub mix)"	Beck, Bonner, Jones, Middlebrooks, Pierce, Satchell, Williams	Beck, Bonner, Jones, Middlebrooks, Pierce, Satchell, Williams	6:25
Total length:				37:15

=== Remastered 2013 release ===
No.	Title	Lyrics	Music	Length
1.	"Hunted Down"			2:42
2.	"Entering"			4:33
3.	"Tears to Forget"		Hiro Yamamoto, Thayil	2:01
4.	"Nothing to Say"			3:57
5.	"Little Joe"			4:29
6.	"Hand of God"		Yamamoto	4:26
7.	"Sub Pop Rock City"		Yamamoto, Thayil, Matt Cameron	3:15
8.	"Fopp"	Billy Beck, Leroy Bonner, Marshall Jones, Ralph Middlebrooks, Marvin Pierce, Clarence Satchell, James Williams	Billy Beck, Leroy Bonner, Marshall Jones, Ralph Middlebrooks, Marvin Pierce, Clarence Satchell, James Williams	3:37
9.	"Fopp (Fucked Up Heavy Dub Mix)"	Beck, Bonner, Jones, Middlebrooks, Pierce, Satchell, Williams	Beck, Bonner, Jones, Middlebrooks, Pierce, Satchell, Williams	6:28
10.	"Kingdom of Come"		Chris Cornell	2:36
11.	"Swallow My Pride"	Mark Arm	Steve Turner	2:20
Total length:				40:28

== Charts ==
Chart (2013)	Peak position
US Vinyl Albums (Billboard)	7
US Tastemaker Albums (Billboard)	22

== Personnel ==
Soundgarden
- Chris Cornell – vocals
- Matt Cameron – drums
- Kim Thayil – guitar
- Hiro Yamamoto – bass

Production (1990 original version)

- Jack Endino – production & engineering, tracks 1–6
- Steve Fisk – production, tracks 7–10
- Drew Canulette – engineering, tracks 7–10
- Soundgarden – co-production on tracks 1–6
- Charles Peterson – photography

Production (2013 remastered version)

- Jack Endino – remastering, all tracks; production & engineering, tracks 1–7
- Steve Fisk – production, tracks 8–11
- Drew Canulette – engineering, tracks 8–11
- Soundgarden – co-production on tracks 1–7
- JJ Golden – remastering, all tracks
- Charles Peterson – photography
- Katey Miller – logo design
