= A-Sides =

Greatest hits album by Soundgarden
- Released: November 4, 1997
- Recorded: 1987–1996
- Genres: Alternative metal; grunge; alternative rock; heavy metal
- Length: 79:10
- Label: A&M
- Producers: Michael Beinhorn; Drew Canulette; Terry Date; Jack Endino; Adam Kasper; Soundgarden

Soundgarden chronology
Down on the Upside (1996)	A-Sides (1997)	Telephantasm (2010)

Professional ratings
Review scores
Source	Rating
AllMusic	4.5/5 stars
Entertainment Weekly	A
NME	7/10 stars
Pitchfork	7.5/10
Q	4/5 stars
Robert Christgau	(3-star Honorable Mention)
Rolling Stone	4/5 stars
Uncut	4/5 stars

A-Sides is a greatest hits album by the American rock band Soundgarden with songs spanning the band's thirteen-year career. It was released on November 4, 1997, through A&M Records.

== Overview ==
Guitarist Kim Thayil said the song list emerged out of list of what each member "thought would make a 'best of' and then we cross-referenced them", adding that while the typical compilation titles 'Best Of' and 'Greatest Hits' was thought by them to a subjective name - "that's something that an individual fan can make of his own collection, and these aren't necessarily our personal favourites" - they went with A-Sides to reflect that these were the A-side singles released on the band's original run. The opening track "Nothing to Say" was originally a B-side to the band's first single "Hunted Down" on Sub Pop in 1987, but Thayil said it took precedence for being their first song to draw a label's attention as part of a compilation titled Bands That Will Make Money. It contains one song absent from previous albums ("Bleed Together") which appeared on import copies of the "Burden in My Hand" single. In addition, "Get on the Snake" from Louder Than Love was released as a promo-only single in 1989. Also, the 1990 Sub Pop single "Room a Thousand Years Wide" does not appear on A-Sides, nor the 1994 single "My Wave" from Superunknown.

The album was released in 1997 on A&M Records and was Soundgarden's last official release for 13 years, until 2010's Telephantasm. It debuted at number 63 on the Billboard 200 album chart. It peaked at number 51 on the UK Albums Chart, number 39 on the Australian Albums Chart, and number 6 on the New Zealand Albums Chart.

AllMusic staff writer Stephen Thomas Erlewine gave the album four and a half out of five stars. He said, "For an act that was one of the definitive album artists of the late '80s and '90s, Soundgarden was a surprisingly effective singles band. Their singles effectively conveyed all of their best ideas, from their sludgy early Sub Pop recordings to the elaborate, post-metal psychedelia of their last two albums, Superunknown and Down on the Upside. That's the reason why the 17-track compilation A-Sides is such a successful overview of the band's too-brief career." Entertainment Weekly reviewer David Browne gave the album an A. He said, "Pruning their best early songwriting ("Hands All Over", "Nothing to Say") and wisely highlighting chunks of their last two (and best) albums, A-Sides presents the band in all its evolving, bridling-horses glory and thunder. When all those Hanson fans grow up and want to educate themselves on the flannel era they missed, here's where they should turn."

Following Chris Cornell's death in May 2017, A-Sides re-entered the Australian albums chart at number 47. On Record Store Day 2018, A-Sides was released on double green translucent vinyl.

== Track listing ==
All tracks are written by Chris Cornell, except where noted.

No.	Title	Music	Album	Length
1.	"Nothing to Say"	Kim Thayil	Screaming Life EP, 1987	3:56
2.	"Flower"	Thayil	Ultramega OK, 1988 (US)/1989 (UK)	3:25
3.	"Loud Love"		Louder Than Love, 1989	4:57
4.	"Hands All Over"	Thayil	Louder Than Love	6:00
5.	"Get on the Snake"	Thayil	Louder Than Love	3:44
6.	"Jesus Christ Pose"	Matt Cameron; Ben Shepherd; Thayil; Chris Cornell	Badmotorfinger, 1991	5:51
7.	"Outshined"		Badmotorfinger	5:11
8.	"Rusty Cage"		Badmotorfinger	4:26
9.	"Spoonman"		Superunknown, 1994	4:06
10.	"The Day I Tried to Live"		Superunknown	5:19
11.	"Black Hole Sun"		Superunknown	5:18
12.	"Fell on Black Days"		Superunknown	4:42
13.	"Pretty Noose"		Down on the Upside, 1996	4:12
14.	"Burden in My Hand"		Down on the Upside	4:50
15.	"Blow Up the Outside World"		Down on the Upside	5:46
16.	"Ty Cobb"	Shepherd	Down on the Upside	3:05
17.	"Bleed Together"		"Burden in My Hand" single, 1996	3:54

== Personnel ==
Soundgarden

- Chris Cornell – lead vocals (all); rhythm guitar (3–17); mandolin and mandola (16)
- Kim Thayil – lead guitar
- Ben Shepherd – bass (6–17); additional vocals (9); mandola and intro instrumentation (16)
- Matt Cameron – drums (all); pots and pans (9)
- Hiro Yamamoto – bass (1–5)

Additional musicians

- Artis the Spoonman – spoons (9)

Technical personnel

- Soundgarden – production (all); mixing (15–17)
- Jack Endino – production, engineering (1); engineering assistant (3–5)
- Drew Canulette – production, engineering (2)
- Terry Date – production, engineering (3–8)
- Michael Beinhorn – production (9–14)
- Adam Kasper – co-production, engineering, mixing (15–17); engineering and mixing assistant (9–14);
- Larry Brewer – production assistant (6–8)
- Michael Barbiero – mixing (3–5)
- Steve Thompson – mixing (3–5)
- Ron Saint Germain – mixing (6–8)
- Brendan O'Brien – mixing (9–14)
- Nelson Ayres – mixing assistant (3–5)
- John Jackson – mixing assistant (6–8)
- Lance Limbocker – engineering (2)
- Jason Corsaro – engineering (9–14)
- Stuart Hallerman – engineering assistance (3–5)
- Efren Herrera – engineering assistant (6–8)
- Matt Bayles – engineering assistant (15–17)
- Sam Hofstedt – engineering assistant (15–17)
- John Burton – additional tracking assistant (15–17)
- Tom Smurdon – additional tracking assistant (15–17)
- Gregg Keplinger – drum technician (15–17)
- Darrell Peters – guitar technician (15–17)
- Howie Weinberg – mastering (3–8)
- Dave Collins – mastering (9–17)

Creative personnel

- Oogie – art direction and design
- Kevin Westenberg – photography
- Charles Peterson – photography
- Michael Lavine – photography
- Mark Seliger – photography
- Steve Gilbert – photography
- Jan Van Oldenmark – photography
- Larimie Garcia – photography
- Jonathan Poneman – booklet message

== Charts ==
=== Album ===
Chart (1997–1998)	Peak position
Australian Albums (ARIA)	39
Canada Top Albums/CDs (RPM)	51
New Zealand Albums (RMNZ)	6
UK Albums (Official Charts)	90
US Billboard 200	63

Chart (2018)	Peak position
Croatian International Albums (HDU)	17
US Top Hard Rock Albums (Billboard)	20

=== Singles ===
Year	Single	Peak chart positions	
Year	Single	US Main	US Mod
1997	"Bleed Together"	13	32

== Certifications ==
Region	Certification	Certified units/sales
United Kingdom (BPI)	Silver	60,000^{‡}
^{‡} Sales+streaming figures based on certification alone.
