= Fopp =

Fopp may refer to:

- "Fopp" (song), a 1975 song by the Ohio Players from Honey
- Fopp (EP), a 1988 EP by Soundgarden, featuring the song of the same name
- Screaming Life/Fopp, a 1990 compilation album by the American rock band Soundgarden
- Fopp (retailer), a British entertainment retailer
- Michael A. Fopp, Director General of the Royal Air Force Museum
