= Jonathan Poneman =

American music executive

- Born: October 9, 1959 (age 66); Toledo, Ohio, U.S.
- Occupation(s): Record Label Executive, Sub Pop, Hardly Art
- Years active: 1983–present
- Parent(s): Harold Poneman, Beverly Poneman (nee Sutker)
- Website: subpop.com

Jonathan Poneman is an American record executive and co-founder of two record labels: Sub Pop and Hardly Art. He was credited by Kurt Cobain as the one who coined the term "grunge."

== Early life and education ==
The third child of Harold and Beverly Poneman, Jonathan Poneman was born October 9, 1959, in Toledo, Ohio, and grew up in the suburb of Ottawa Hills. He got his first job, pumping gas at a local filling station at the age of 14. After being kicked out of high school in 11th grade, Poneman moved to Scottsdale, Arizona, and graduated from Arcadia High School in 1977. He moved to Washington in the same year.

== Career ==
In 1983, Poneman began volunteering at the University of Washington's student-run radio station, KCMU, a forerunner to KEXP, and important champion of local independent music. Mark Arm of Mudhoney, photographer Charles Peterson, Soundgarden guitarist Kim Thayil, and Poneman's eventual business partner Bruce Pavitt also worked regular air shifts at the station.

At a 1985 KCMU benefit show Poneman had booked, he first saw Soundgarden perform at the Rainbow Tavern near the University of Washington and was especially impressed by the band's singer, Chris Cornell.

I walked up to the front of the stage after and introduced myself to Chris and said, "My name is Jonathan, I’m the host of Audioasis and I do the booking down here, and I gotta tell you, that was one of the best shows I’ve seen in my whole life."

He was the first person to me that planted that seed that, "You guys will be the future of rock music," Chris remembered. "You guys will be playing huge places. You guys will be the ones on commercial rock radio stations that kids listen to in their Camaros."

In 1987, Poneman contributed $2,000 of his own money to help get Soundgarden's debut single, "Hunted Down" / "Nothing to Say" and EP, Screaming Life, released on Pavitt's fledgling Sub Pop label. On April 1, 1988, Poneman and Pavitt pooled together $19,000 which gave Poneman a 50% stake in the business, to open Sub Pop Records as a full service record label in Seattle.

Poneman was the first record label executive to sign Nirvana to a record contract. In 2007, Poneman started an offshoot label called Hardly Art. Kurt Cobain stated in a 1993 interview that Poneman may have been the person to first come up with the term grunge for the type of music they were producing.

As of 2020, Poneman remains at the helm of Sub Pop Records and splits his time between Seattle, Brooklyn, and Lipce Reymontowskie, Poland.

== Health ==
In 2013 he was diagnosed with Parkinson's disease.

== Awards ==
In 2014, Poneman was the recipient of the Independent Spirit Award, presented by the Music Business Association. In 2019 he was also honored with a Lifetime Achievement Award by the American Association of Independent Music (A2IM).
