= Telephantasm =

Greatest hits album by Soundgarden
- Released: September 28, 2010
- Recorded: 1987–2010
- Genre: Alternative metal; grunge; alternative rock; heavy metal
- Length: 59:40 (standard edition); 114:10 (deluxe edition)
- Label: A&M; Interscope
- Producer: Michael Beinhorn; Drew Canulette; Terry Date; Jack Endino; Adam Kasper; Soundgarden

Soundgarden chronology
| A-Sides (1997) | Telephantasm (2010) | Live on I-5 (2011) |

Singles from Telephantasm
- 1. "Black Rain" Released: August 17, 2010; 2. "The Telephantasm" Released: November 26, 2010

Telephantasm is a compilation album by the American rock band Soundgarden. Featuring songs that span 23 years of the band's career, it was released on September 28, 2010, through A&M Records. The album was certified platinum by the RIAA after its first day of retail availability based on the one million discs that were included in packages for the video game Guitar Hero: Warriors of Rock.

== Overview ==
The album was released in September 2010 on A&M Records following the band's reunion earlier that year. The career-spanning retrospective compilation includes an unreleased track, "Black Rain", taken from the Badmotorfinger recording sessions. In late August 2010, "Black Rain" reached No. 44 on the Canadian Hot 100 and No. 96 on the US Billboard Hot 100. The song also peaked at No. 14 on the Billboard Rock Songs chart.

Kim Thayil explained the title Telephantasm as "an illusion at a distance, or a ghost from afar. Which I think would be an appropriate reference to what we have here — a retrospective of a band that had been inactive for thirteen years." He added that the album emerged from a project to create a "B-sides" compilation following the 1997 greatest hits album A-Sides, but the band decided to include some better-known songs because "we need to re-establish ourselves with the rock and roll audience out there, the younger audience".

The single-CD version of the album is featured in the music video game Guitar Hero: Warriors of Rock, with "Black Rain" available on the disc and the remaining eleven tracks available as downloadable content alongside the release of the game.

The two-CD/DVD limited edition package includes a booklet containing a biography of Soundgarden written by Jeff Gilbert, a message from Thayil, and content credits.

The album features artwork by Josh Graham, who handles the visual arts for Neurosis as well as artwork for other musical artists.

== Track listing ==
=== Single-disc version ===
All tracks are written by Chris Cornell, except where noted.

| No. | Title | Music | Length |
|---|---|---|---|
| 1. | "Hunted Down" (Screaming Life EP, 1987) | Kim Thayil | 2:41 |
| 2. | "Hands All Over" (Louder Than Love, 1989) | Thayil | 5:58 |
| 3. | "Outshined" (Badmotorfinger, 1991) | | 5:11 |
| 4. | "Rusty Cage" (Badmotorfinger) | | 4:25 |
| 5. | "Birth Ritual" (Singles: Original Motion Picture Soundtrack, 1992) | Cornell; Thayil; Matt Cameron | 6:05 |
| 6. | "My Wave" (Superunknown, 1994) | Cornell, Thayil | 5:13 |
| 7. | "Spoonman" (Superunknown) | | 4:08 |
| 8. | "Black Hole Sun" (Superunknown) | | 5:19 |
| 9. | "Fell on Black Days" (Superunknown) | | 4:39 |
| 10. | "Burden in My Hand" (Down on the Upside, 1996) | | 4:50 |
| 11. | "Blow Up the Outside World" (Down on the Upside) | | 5:46 |
| 12. | "Black Rain" (Previously unreleased, 2010) | Thayil, Ben Shepherd | 5:25 |
| Total length: | | | 59:40 |

=== Deluxe edition ===
Disc one
| No. | Title | Lyrics | Music | Place of origin | Length |
|---|---|---|---|---|---|
| 1. | "All Your Lies" ('86 version) | Chris Cornell | Kim Thayil; Hiro Yamamoto | Deep Six, 1986 | 3:52 |
| 2. | "Hunted Down" | Cornell | Thayil | Screaming Life EP, 1987 | 2:41 |
| 3. | "Fopp" | Billy Beck; Leroy Bonner; Marshall Jones; Ralph Middlebrooks; Mervin Pierce; Clarence Satchell; James Williams | Beck; Bonner; Jones; Middlebrooks; Pierce; Satchell; Williams | Fopp, 1988 | 3:38 |
| 4. | "Beyond the Wheel" | Cornell | Cornell | Ultramega OK, 1988 | 4:23 |
| 5. | "Flower" (BBC session for John Peel at the Golders Green Hippodrome, Golders Green, London, England, May 14, 1989) | Cornell | Thayil | Originally from Ultramega OK | 3:28 |
| 6. | "Hands All Over" | Cornell | Thayil | Louder Than Love, 1989 | 5:58 |
| 7. | "Big Dumb Sex" | Cornell | Cornell | Louder Than Love | 4:11 |
| 8. | "Get on the Snake" (Live at the Whisky a Go Go, Los Angeles, CA) | Cornell | Thayil | Louder Than Live, 1990 | 3:30 |
| 9. | "Room a Thousand Years Wide" (Single version) | Thayil | Matt Cameron | Badmotorfinger, 1991 | 4:14 |
| 10. | "Rusty Cage" | Cornell | Cornell | Badmotorfinger | 4:27 |
| 11. | "Outshined" | Cornell | Cornell | Badmotorfinger | 5:11 |
| 12. | "Slaves & Bulldozers" | Cornell | Cornell; Ben Shepherd | Badmotorfinger | 6:58 |
| Total length: | | | | | 52:31 |

Disc two
| No. | Title | Lyrics | Music | Place of origin | Length |
|---|---|---|---|---|---|
| 1. | "Jesus Christ Pose" (Live) | Cornell | Cameron; Cornell; Shepherd; Thayil | "Black Hole Sun" single B-side, 1994; originally from Badmotorfinger | 7:13 |
| 2. | "Birth Ritual" | Cornell | Cornell; Cameron; Thayil | Singles: Original Motion Picture Soundtrack, 1992 | 6:04 |
| 3. | "My Wave" | Cornell | Cornell; Thayil | Superunknown, 1994 | 5:15 |
| 4. | "Superunknown" | Cornell | Cornell; Thayil | Superunknown | 5:09 |
| 5. | "Spoonman" | Cornell | Cornell | Superunknown | 4:07 |
| 6. | "Black Hole Sun" | Cornell | Cornell | Superunknown | 5:20 |
| 7. | "Fell on Black Days" (Video version) | Cornell | Cornell | Originally from Superunknown | 4:46 |
| 8. | "Burden in My Hand" | Cornell | Cornell | Down on the Upside, 1996 | 4:49 |
| 9. | "Dusty" | Cornell | Shepherd | Down on the Upside | 4:36 |
| 10. | "Pretty Noose" (Live on Saturday Night Live on May 18, 1996) | Cornell | Cornell | Originally from Down on the Upside | 4:25 |
| 11. | "Blow Up the Outside World" (MTV Live 'N' Loud) | Cornell | Cornell | Originally from Down on the Upside | 5:32 |
| 12. | "Black Rain" | Cornell | Thayil; Shepherd | Previously unreleased | 5:26 |
| 13. | "The Telephantasm" (iTunes album bonus track) | Thayil | Thayil | Previously unreleased | 2:57 |
| Total length: | | | | | 65:39 |

=== DVD ===
| No. | Title | Length |
|---|---|---|
| 1. | "Flower" |
| 2. | "Hands All Over" |
| 3. | "Loud Love" |
| 4. | "Jesus Christ Pose" (Original version) |
| 5. | "Outshined" |
| 6. | "Rusty Cage" |
| 7. | "My Wave" |
| 8. | "Spoonman" |
| 9. | "The Day I Tried to Live" (Uncensored) |
| 10. | "Black Hole Sun" |
| 11. | "Fell on Black Days" |
| 12. | "Pretty Noose" (Uncensored) |
| 13. | "Burden in My Hand" |
| 14. | "Blow Up the Outside World" (Uncensored) |

=== Bonus videos ===
| No. | Title | Length |
|---|---|---|
| 1. | "Spoonman" (Mash-up version) |
| 2. | "The Day I Tried to Live" (European version) |
| 3. | "Superunknown" |
| 4. | "Pretty Noose" (International version) |
| 5. | "Pretty Noose" (Alternate ending) |
| 6. | "Blow Up the Outside World" (Censored) |

== Personnel ==
Soundgarden

- Chris Cornell – vocals, rhythm guitar
- Kim Thayil – lead guitar
- Ben Shepherd – bass on tracks 3–12 (Single Disc); tracks 9–12 on CD1, and tracks 1–12 on CD2 (Deluxe Edition)
- Matt Cameron – drums
- Hiro Yamamoto – bass on tracks 1–2 (Single Disc); tracks 1–7 on CD1 (Deluxe Edition)
- Jason Everman – bass on track 8 on CD1 (Deluxe Edition)
- Scott Sundquist – drums on track 1 on CD1 (Deluxe Edition)

== Charts ==
| Chart (2010) | Peak position |
|---|---|
| Australian Albums (ARIA) | 20 |
| Belgian Albums (Ultratop Flanders) | 96 |
| Belgian Albums (Ultratop Wallonia) | 76 |
| Canadian Albums (Billboard) | 15 |
| Dutch Albums (Album Top 100) | 97 |
| German Albums (Offizielle Top 100) | 73 |
| Greek Albums (IFPI) | 11 |
| Irish Albums (IRMA) | 65 |
| Italian Albums (FIMI) | 48 |
| New Zealand Albums (RMNZ) | 12 |
| Norwegian Albums (VG-lista) | 35 |
| Scottish Albums (OCC) | 83 |
| Spanish Albums (Promusicae) | 66 |
| Swiss Albums (Schweizer Hitparade) | 94 |
| UK Albums (OCC) | 83 |
| UK Rock & Metal Albums (OCC) | 5 |
| US Billboard 200 | 24 |
| US Hard Rock Albums (Billboard) | 2 |
| US Tastemaker Albums (Billboard) | 5 |
| US Top Rock Albums (Billboard) | 7 |

== Certifications ==
| Region | Certification | Certified units/sales |
|---|---|---|
| United States (RIAA) | Platinum | 1,000,000^{^} |
^{^} Shipments figures based on certification alone.
