= Live to Rise =

2012 song by Soundgarden

Single by Soundgarden

from the album Avengers Assemble: Music from and Inspired by the Motion Picture
- Released: April 17, 2012
- Recorded: 2012
- Genre: Alternative rock; hard rock
- Length: 4:40
- Label: Hollywood
- Songwriter: Chris Cornell
- Producers: Adam Kasper; Soundgarden

Soundgarden singles chronology
"The Telephantasm" (2010)	"Live to Rise" (2012)	"Been Away Too Long" (2012)

Music video
- Live to Rise on YouTube

"Live to Rise" is a song recorded by American rock band Soundgarden for the 2012 film The Avengers. The song was released by Hollywood Records on April 17, 2012, as a free digital download during its first week of availability at the iTunes Store, and was later included on the film's soundtrack album, Avengers Assemble: Music from and Inspired by the Motion Picture, released on May 1, 2012.

"Live to Rise" was the first Soundgarden song to be both fully recorded and released since the band reformed in 2010, as "Black Rain" was partly recorded in the early 1990s. The single has been described as a "riff-heavy rocker" that, according to singer Chris Cornell, would "work just fine" on the band's then-upcoming album King Animal, even though it did not necessarily represent the entire album's sound. Despite earlier speculation, "Live to Rise" did not appear on King Animal. In 2014 the track was released as part of the 3-CD compilation album Echo of Miles: Scattered Tracks Across the Path.

== Reception ==
USA Today's review of the Avengers Assemble soundtrack declares "Live to Rise" "is The Incredible Hulk on this all-star soundtrack for the all-star superhero movie The Avengers."

== Charts ==
=== Weekly charts ===
Weekly chart performance for "Live to Rise"
Chart (2012)	Peak position
Canada Hot 100 (Billboard)	69
Canada Rock (Billboard)	1
UK Rock & Metal (Official Charts)	11
US Bubbling Under Hot 100 (Billboard)	10
US Hot Rock & Alternative Songs (Billboard)	4

=== Year-end charts ===
Year-end chart performance for "Live to Rise"
Chart (2012)	Position
US Hot Rock Songs (Billboard)	20
