= Deep Six (album) =

Compilation album by various artists
- Released: March 21, 1986
- Recorded: August–September 1985
- Studio: Ironwood Studios, Seattle, Washington
- Genre: Grunge
- Length: 43:53
- Label: C/Z Records
- Producer: Chris Hanzsek, Tina Casale

1994 re-release artwork

Professional ratings
Review scores
Source	Rating
AllMusic	2.5/5 stars

Deep Six is a 1986 compilation album featuring six Seattle-based rock bands. It was the first release by C/Z Records, with a catalogue number of CZ01 for 2,000 copies. The album was reissued as a joint C/Z Records/A&M Records release on April 5, 1994.

== Development ==
The album was compiled by Seattle locals Chris Hanzsek and Tina Casale of C/Z Records to showcase what was going on in the Seattle rock community at this time by drawing on the talents of six like-minded bands. The album was primarily a document of Seattle’s local music scene and became vital to the history of grunge. It represents the early recordings of a handful of bands that would later become key figures in grunge, and helped establish its concepts and sound.

In the early 1980s, the Seattle branch of the indie movement was influenced by punk rock; however, it removed its speed and its structure and added elements of metal. The Melvins slowed down punk rock to develop their own slow, heavy, sludgy sound. When they contributed four tracks to Deep Six they were regarded as one of Seattle's top bands. Soundgarden provided the most abrasive sound on the album after having formed only a year before. The U-Men contributed minimalist punk with "Sabbath" style metal. Skin Yard's guitarist, Jack Endino, would go on to record and produce many of the grunge bands, and helped to establish Soundgarden, Mudhoney, and Nirvana. He was able to bring a similar sonic quality to some of the tracks recorded by bands who had diverse sounds.

Green River had released its debut EP Come On Down several months before Deep Six; therefore, Come On Down is considered the first grunge record. Members from this band would later form Pearl Jam and Mudhoney, two bands that would become internationally famous. However, Deep Six featured several other bands' first appearance on record and is regarded as the first grunge compilation.

== Track listing ==
1. Green River – "10,000 Things" (lyrics: Mark Arm; music: Stone Gossard, Jeff Ament, Bruce Fairweather, Alex Vincent) – 3:37
2. Melvins – "Scared" (Melvins) – 2:19
3. Melvins – "Blessing the Operation" (Melvins) – 0:44
4. Malfunkshun – "With Yo' Heart (Not Yo' Hands)" (Malfunkshun) – 3:54
5. Skin Yard – "Throb" (Daniel House, Jack Endino, Ben McMillan) – 5:29
6. Soundgarden – "Heretic" (lyrics: Hiro Yamamoto; music: Kim Thayil) – 3:22
7. Soundgarden – "Tears to Forget" (lyrics: Chris Cornell; music: Thayil, Yamamoto) – 2:06
8. Malfunkshun – "Stars-N-You" (Malfunkshun) – 1:46
9. Melvins – "Grinding Process" (Melvins) – 2:09
10. Melvins – "She Waits" (Melvins) – 0:40
11. Skin Yard – "The Birds" (House, Endino, McMillan) – 3:56
12. Soundgarden – "All Your Lies" (lyrics: Cornell; music: Thayil, Yamamoto) – 3:53
13. Green River – "Your Own Best Friend" (lyrics: Arm; music: Gossard, Ament, Fairweather, Vincent) – 6:21
14. The U-Men – "They" (U-Men) – 3:32

An alternative version of Soundgarden's "Heretic" appears on the soundtrack for the 1990 film Pump Up the Volume, as well as on the Soundgarden EP Loudest Love. A re-recorded version of Soundgarden's "All Your Lies" (with new drummer Matt Cameron) appears on their 1988 album Ultramega OK; the original also appears only on the double-disc version of band's 2010 compilation album Telephantasm, while a re-recorded version of "Tears to Forget" (with Cameron) appears on their 1987 EP Screaming Life. Alternative versions of the Melvins' "Blessing the Operation" and "Grinding Process" appear on 26 Songs.

== Personnel ==
- Chris Hanzsek – producer
- Tina Casale – producer
- Reyza Sageb – original blue album artwork
- Charles Peterson – photography
- Jane Duke – photography
- Green River
  - Mark Arm – vocals
  - Jeff Ament – bass
  - Stone Gossard – guitar
  - Bruce Fairweather – guitar
  - Alex Vincent – drums
- Melvins
  - King Buzzo – vocals, guitar
  - Matt Lukin – bass
  - Dale Crover – drums
- Malfunkshun
  - Andrew Wood – vocals, bass
  - Regan Hagar – drums
  - Kevin Wood – guitar
- Skin Yard
  - Ben McMillan – vocals, saxophone on "The Birds"
  - Jack Endino – guitar
  - Daniel House – bass
  - Matt Cameron – drums
- Soundgarden
  - Chris Cornell – vocals
  - Hiro Yamamoto – bass
  - Kim Thayil – guitar
  - Scott Sundquist – drums
- The U-Men
  - John Bigley – vocals
  - Tom Price – guitar
  - Jim Tillman – bass
  - Charlie Ryan – drums

== Bibliography ==
- Anderson, Kyle (2007). Accidental Revolution: The Story of Grunge. Macmillan. ISBN 978-0-312-35819-8.
