= Flower (Soundgarden song) =

1989 single by Soundgarden

Single by Soundgarden

from the album Ultramega OK
- B-side: "Head Injury" "Toy Box"
- Released: May 1989
- Recorded: Spring 1988
- Studio: Dogfish Mobile Unit, Seattle, Washington and Newberg, Oregon
- Genre: Grunge
- Length: 3:25
- Label: SST
- Composer: Kim Thayil
- Lyricist: Chris Cornell
- Producers: Drew Canulette; Soundgarden

Soundgarden singles chronology
"Hunted Down" (1987)	"Flower" (1989)	"Loud Love" (1989)

"Flower" is a song by American rock band Soundgarden. Featuring lyrics written by frontman Chris Cornell and music written by guitarist Kim Thayil, "Flower" was released in 1989, as the only single from their debut studio album, Ultramega OK (1988). The song was included on Soundgarden's 1997 greatest hits album, A-Sides. An alternate BBC version of "Flower" recorded on May 14, 1989, appeared on the Deluxe Edition of the band's 2010 compilation album, Telephantasm.

== Origin and recording ==
"Flower" features lyrics written by frontman Chris Cornell and music written by guitarist Kim Thayil. Thayil on the song:

This song marks the first time I ever blew on a guitar. I put the guitar down on the ground near the amp to get a humming feedback, as opposed to a squealy one, and blew across the strings in rhythm with the drums. There's probably some obscure Mississippi blues guitarist like 'Blind Lemon Pledge' who's done that before, but "Flower" is the first time any rock band had recorded the sound of someone blowing across the strings. It sounds like a sitar.

== Composition ==
Thayil stated, "On the song "Flower" from Ultramega OK, loads of people asked me how I played that so fast—they think I'm playing all these wild barre chords. It's just tuning the bottom E down to D!"

== Lyrics ==
Regarding "Flower", Cornell said "it's about a girl ... who becomes a woman and basically invests everything in vanity and then burns out quick."

== Release and reception ==
"Flower" was released as a single on May 5, 1989, with a previously unreleased B-side titled "Toy Box". The B-side "Head Injury" can be found on the Ultramega OK album. "Toy Box" was recorded during the sessions for their debut EP, Screaming Life. "Flower" was the only single released from Ultramega OK. The cover photo of the single was taken by Charles Peterson, a noted photographer of the early Seattle music scene. An alternate BBC version of "Flower" was recorded on May 14, 1989 for John Peel at the Hippodrome in Golders Green, London and appears on the Deluxe Edition of the band's 2010 compilation album, Telephantasm.

== Music video ==
Released in late 1988, the black-and-white music video for "Flower", directed by Mark Miremont, features the band performing the song amid scenes of the band members wandering around a city. As Soundgarden's first music video, the video was put into rotation on MTV's underground alternative music show, 120 Minutes.

== Track listing ==
1. "Flower" (Chris Cornell, Kim Thayil) – 3:25
2. "Head Injury" (Cornell) – 2:22
3. "Toy Box" (Hiro Yamamoto, Thayil) – 5:39

== Personnel ==
Personnel taken from the single's liner notes.

- Chris Cornell – vocals
- Kim Thayil – guitar
- Hiro Yamamoto – bass
- Matt Cameron – drums

== Accolades ==
Publication	Country	Accolade	Year	Rank
Spex	Germany	"Singles of the Year"	1989	31
