= Bleed Together =

Song by Soundgarden

Promotional single by Soundgarden

from the album A-Sides
- Released: November 1997
- Recorded: November 1995 – February 1996
- Length: 3:54
- Label: A&M
- Songwriter: Chris Cornell
- Producers: Adam Kasper, Soundgarden

Soundgarden singles chronology
| "Ty Cobb" (1997) | "Bleed Together" (1997) | "Black Rain" (2010) |

"Bleed Together" is a song by the American rock band Soundgarden. Written by frontman Chris Cornell, "Bleed Together" was first released in the United States on Soundgarden's post-breakup greatest hits album, A-Sides (1997). It had previously appeared as a B-side on some foreign copies of the band's 1996 single, "Burden in My Hand". It was released as a radio single in November 1997 in support of A-Sides, after the band's breakup in April 1997. The song peaked at number 13 on the Billboard Mainstream Rock Tracks chart.

== Origin and recording ==
"Bleed Together" was written by frontman Chris Cornell. It was recorded by Soundgarden in Seattle, Washington, during the Down on the Upside sessions. Guitarist Kim Thayil on the song:

That came from the Down on the Upside session and originally the record company was interested in it being on the album, but we weren't interested in putting it on the album because we weren't happy with the mix we got for it. Also, we had to concern ourselves with the length of the record and how much time we could fit on one disc, so we never finished it before Down on the Upside came out. This was one of many mixes we had tried at the time.

== Composition ==
"Bleed Together" is one of the few Soundgarden songs written in the key of E. Thayil said, "It's a fast, energetic, punk rock type song with a hooky melody. Chris sings aggressively, but definitely melodically—as opposed to screaming—over these fast punk rock chords." Drummer Matt Cameron can be heard visiting the paradiddle for effect on the ride cymbal during the bridge of the song.

== Release and reception ==
"Bleed Together" was released as a promo CD single. It was the final single released by Soundgarden until "Black Rain" in August 2010. Thayil said, "We decided it would be a good single and song to promote A-Sides." The song peaked at number 13 on the Billboard Mainstream Rock Tracks chart and number 32 on the Billboard Modern Rock Tracks chart. In Canada, "Bleed Together" charted on the Alternative Top 30 chart where it peaked at number 28.

== Charts ==
| Chart (1997) | Peak position |
|---|---|
| Canada Rock/Alternative (RPM) | 28 |
| US Mainstream Rock (Billboard) | 13 |
| US Alternative Airplay (Billboard) | 32 |
