= The Telephantasm =

Song by Soundgarden

Single by Soundgarden

from the album Telephantasm
- B-side: "Gun" (Live)
- Released: November 26, 2010
- Recorded: 1987, 2010
- Genre: Heavy metal; grunge
- Length: 2:57
- Label: A&M
- Songwriter(s): Kim Thayil
- Producer(s): Soundgarden; Adam Kasper; Steve Fisk

Soundgarden singles chronology
"Black Rain" (2010)	"The Telephantasm" (2010)	"Live to Rise" (2012)

"The Telephantasm" is a single by the American rock band Soundgarden. The single was released on Black Friday, November 26, 2010. The track has also appeared as a bonus track of the deluxe edition of Telephantasm upon purchasing the full album download from iTunes. The song was mostly recorded during sessions for Screaming Life in 1987 and was remixed by Steve Fisk in 2010.

== Track listing (7" vinyl single) ==
No.	Title	Writer(s)	Length
1.	"The Telephantasm"	Kim Thayil	2:57
2.	"Gun" (Live at the Showbox)	Chris Cornell	5:05

== Charts ==
Chart (2010)	Peak position
US Hot Singles Sales (Billboard)	9
