= Hunted Down =

Single by Soundgarden

from the EP Screaming Life
- B-side: "Nothing to Say"
- Released: June 1, 1987
- Studio: Reciprocal (Seattle)
- Genre: Grunge
- Length: 2:42
- Label: Sub Pop
- Songwriters: Chris Cornell; Kim Thayil
- Producers: Jack Endino; Soundgarden

Soundgarden singles chronology
"Hunted Down" (1987)	"Flower" (1989)

"Hunted Down" is a song by the American rock band Soundgarden. Featuring lyrics written by frontman Chris Cornell and music written by guitarist Kim Thayil, "Hunted Down" was released in June 1987 as the band's first single. It is the first track on the band's first release, the Screaming Life EP (1987). The song was included on the band's 2010 compilation album, Telephantasm.

== Origin and recording ==
"Hunted Down" features lyrics written by frontman Chris Cornell and music written by guitarist Kim Thayil. Thayil on the song:

That song wasn't supposed to be as heavy sounding as it turned out. We just started jamming on the riff and it took on the 'noise rock' dimensions, kind of a rhythmic thing. And that solo is a noise solo. It's very dissonant.

== Release and reception ==
"Hunted Down" was released as a single in 1987 with a B-side titled "Nothing to Say", which can also be found on Screaming Life and the band's greatest hits compilation, A-Sides (1997). The single was pressed on blue vinyl as a limited edition with only 500 copies made, and has since become a Soundgarden collector's item. Oddly, "Nothing to Say", rather than "Hunted Down", appeared on A-Sides. Kim Thayil jokingly explained the replacement with "that's about the level of communication the band was at back then".

"Hunted Down" was the first song on Sub Pop's "hold music" tape. According to guitarist Kim Thayil, "You would call them up, and when they put you on hold you heard 'Hunted Down'." Upon hearing the song, record labels began contacting the band, which eventually led to the band signing with A&M Records.

The single was reissued as a limited edition, orange 7" record for Record Store Day on April 17, 2010.

== Track listing ==
All songs written by Chris Cornell and Kim Thayil.

1. "Hunted Down" – 2:42
2. "Nothing to Say" – 3:56
