= The Avengers (soundtrack) =

2012 film score by Alan Silvestri

The Avengers (Original Motion Picture Soundtrack) is the film score for the Marvel Studios film The Avengers composed and conducted by Alan Silvestri. It was released by Hollywood Records on May 1, 2012. A separate soundtrack and concept album, titled Avengers Assemble (Music from and Inspired by the Motion Picture), by various artists was also released on the same date.

== The Avengers (Original Motion Picture Soundtrack) ==
The Avengers (Original Motion Picture Soundtrack)

Film score by Alan Silvestri
- Released: May 1, 2012
- Studio: Abbey Road Studios
- Genre: Film score
- Length: 64:25
- Labels: Hollywood; Marvel Music
- Producers: Alan Silvestri; David Bifano

Alan Silvestri chronology
Captain America: The First Avenger (2011)	The Avengers (Original Motion Picture Soundtrack) (2012)	Flight (2012)

Professional ratings
Review scores
Source	Rating
Filmtracks	3/5 stars
Movie Wave	3.5/5 stars
Soundtrack Geek	7.11/10
Tracksounds	6/10 stars

In November 2011, Marvel announced that Alan Silvestri, who scored Captain America: The First Avenger, would write and compose the score for The Avengers (making him the first composer to score more than one movie in the Marvel Cinematic Universe). Silvestri stated, "This is actually a very unique experience [for me]. I've worked on films where there have been a number of stars and certainly worked on films where there have been characters of equal weight in terms of their level of importance and profile in the film, but this one is somewhat extreme in that regard because each of these characters has their own world and it's a very different situation. It's very challenging to look for a way to give everyone the weight and consideration they need, but at the same time the film is really about the coming together of these characters, which implies that there is this entity called the Avengers, which really has to be representative of all of them together." Silvestri recorded the score at Abbey Road Studios in London, England. Avengers director Joss Whedon described the score as "old school", saying "the score is very old-fashioned, which is why [Silvestri] was letter perfect for this movie because he can give you the heightened emotion, the [Hans Zimmer] school of 'I'm just feeling a lot right now!' but he can also be extraordinarily cue and character specific, which I love." Silvestri reprises his themes from Captain America: The First Avenger, and introduced new ones - including the theme for Black Widow, which is "a lonely, plucked theme with an Eastern European flavor to define this character". The score album was released on May 1, 2012.

=== Track listing ===
All tracks are written by Alan Silvestri.

No.	Title	Length
1.	"Arrival"	2:59
2.	"Doors Open From Both Sides"	2:48
3.	"Tunnel Chase"	2:36
4.	"Stark Goes Green"	2:41
5.	"Helicarrier"	2:09
6.	"Subjugation"	3:00
7.	"Don't Take My Stuff"	4:42
8.	"Red Ledger"	5:11
9.	"Assault"	4:26
10.	"They Called It"	2:41
11.	"Performance Issues"	3:35
12.	"Seeing, Not Believing"	4:25
13.	"Assemble"	4:31
14.	"I Got a Ride"	4:00
15.	"A Little Help"	3:14
16.	"One Way Trip"	5:50
17.	"A Promise"	3:34
18.	"The Avengers"	2:03
Total length:		1:04:25

Simultaneously with the digital release, the album was physically released by Hollywood Records, Marvel Music, and Intrada Records. Several tracks on this release are longer than on the digital album and there is one additional track, "Interrogation".

All tracks are written by Alan Silvestri.

No.	Title	Length
1.	"Arrival"	2:59
2.	"Doors Open From Both Sides" (Extended)	3:29
3.	"Tunnel Chase" (Extended)	4:47
4.	"Interrogation"	2:38
5.	"Stark Goes Green" (Extended)	4:46
6.	"Helicarrier"	2:09
7.	"Subjugation" (Extended)	3:40
8.	"Don't Take My Stuff" (Extended)	5:06
9.	"Red Ledger"	5:10
10.	"Assault"	4:25
11.	"They Called It"	2:41
12.	"Performance Issues" (Extended)	4:56
13.	"Seeing, Not Believing"	4:25
14.	"Assemble" (Extended)	5:21
15.	"I Got a Ride"	4:00
16.	"A Little Help" (Extended)	3:49
17.	"One Way Trip"	5:50
18.	"A Promise"	3:34
19.	"The Avengers"	2:03
Total length:		1:16:08

== Avengers Assemble (Music from and Inspired by the Motion Picture) ==
Avengers Assemble (Music from and Inspired by the Motion Picture)

Soundtrack album by various artists
- Released: May 1, 2012
- Labels: Hollywood; Marvel Music
- Producers: Mitchell Leib; Dave Jordan

Singles from Avengers Assemble: Music from and Inspired by the Motion Picture
- 1. "Live to Rise" Released: April 17, 2012; 2. "Comeback" Released: June 4, 2012

Professional ratings
Review scores
Source	Rating
AllMusic	2.5/5 stars

In March 2012, American alternative rock band Soundgarden announced through their official Facebook page that they had written a song to be included on the film's soundtrack, entitled "Live to Rise". The song was released on April 17, 2012, as a free digital download during its first week of availability in the iTunes Store. Additionally, Indian rock band Agnee released a music video for their single "Hello Andheron", which served as the theme song for the Indian release of the film. The following day, Marvel released the album's full track listing, which was released by Hollywood Records on May 1, 2012. A cover of AC/DC's song "Shoot to Thrill", performed by Theory of a Deadman, was originally to be included on the album, but was removed for unknown reasons.

=== Track listing ===
Avengers Assemble track list
No.	Title	Writer(s)	Producer(s)	Length
1.	"Live to Rise" (performed by Soundgarden)	Chris Cornell	Adam Kasper; Soundgarden	4:40
2.	"I'm Alive" (performed by Shinedown)	Brent Smith; Dave Bassett; Eric Bass	Bass; Bassett (voc.)	3:39
3.	"Dirt and Roses" (performed by Rise Against)	Zach Blair; Brandon Barnes; Timothy McIlrath; Joseph Principe	Bill Stevenson; Jason Livermore	3:14
4.	"Even If I Could" (performed by Papa Roach)	Papa Roach; James Michael	Michael	3:16
5.	"Unbroken" (performed by Black Veil Brides)	Blair Daly; Jeremy Ferguson; Jacob Pitts; Andy Biersack; Sean Beavan	Beavan	3:27
6.	"Breathe" (performed by Scott Weiland)	Weiland; Doug Grean	Grean; Weiland	3:17
7.	"Comeback" (performed by Redlight King)	Mark Kasprzyk; Xandy Barry; Wally Gagel	Wax Ltd	3:39
8.	"Into the Blue" (performed by Bush)	Gavin Rossdale	Bob Rock	4:15
9.	"A New Way to Bleed" (Photek Remix) (performed by Evanescence)	Amy Lee; Terry Balsamo	Nick Raskulinecz	4:00
10.	"Count Me Out" (performed by PusherJones)	Dave Kushner; Franky Perez; Dave Warren; Jeremy O'Shea	Kushner	4:37
11.	"Wherever I Go" (performed by Buckcherry)	Josh Todd; Steve Dacanay; Keith Nelson	Nelson	4:13
12.	"From Out of Nowhere" (performed by Five Finger Death Punch)	Michael Andrew Bordin; Roddy Christopher Bottum; Bill David Gould; James Blanco Martin; Michael Allen Patton	Zoltan Bathory; Ivan Moody	3:23
13.	"Shake the Ground" (performed by Cherri Bomb)	Cherri Bomb; Adam Watts; Andy Dodd; Gannin Arnold	Red Decibel	2:40

International edition bonus track
No.	Title	Writer(s)	Artist	Length
14.	"Pistols at Dawn" (performed by Kasabian)	Sergio Pizzorno	Pizzorno; Dan the Automator	5:18

None of these songs, with the exception of "Live to Rise," are heard in the film.

=== Charts ===
Year	Chart	Peak position
2012	Canadian Albums Chart	14
2012	US Billboard 200	11
2012	US Billboard Top Hard Rock Albums	1
2012	US Billboard Soundtrack Albums	2
