= Pretty Noose =

1996 single by Soundgarden

Single by Soundgarden

from the album Down on the Upside
- B-side: "Jerry Garcia's Finger"
- Released: May 7, 1996
- Genre: Progressive rock; alternative rock
- Length: 4:12
- Label: A&M
- Songwriter: Chris Cornell
- Producers: Adam Kasper; Soundgarden

Soundgarden singles chronology
"Fell on Black Days" (1994)	"Pretty Noose" (1996)	"Burden in My Hand" (1996)

Music video
- "Pretty Noose" on YouTube

"Pretty Noose" is a song by the American rock band Soundgarden. Written by the band's frontman, Chris Cornell, "Pretty Noose" was released to US radio on April 30, 1996 as the first single from the band's fifth studio album, Down on the Upside (1996), and released as a single in Europe on May 7. The song reached number two on the US Billboard Modern Rock Tracks chart, topped the UK Rock & Metal Singles Chart, and peaked at number 10 in Finland. The song was included on Soundgarden's 1997 greatest hits album, A-Sides.

== Origin and recording ==
"Pretty Noose" was written by frontman Chris Cornell. Drummer Matt Cameron said of the song,

That song for me was kind of interesting, because we were at the phase where we were just going to demo tunes. So I learned the tune and recorded it, and we ended up using that take. When we recorded that, I had walked to the studio (in Seattle) and my legs were really tired. But to make a long story short, I was trying to get a walking feel on the drum part. So it probably has a little weird shuffle to it probably from that walk that I took to the studio that day.

== Composition ==
"Pretty Noose" has a distinctive opening wah-wah guitar riff. The song was written in C-G-C-G-G-E tuning, which the bass guitarist Ben Shepherd first introduced to the band with the song "Head Down" from Superunknown.

== Lyrics ==
According to Cornell, "Pretty Noose" is about "an attractively packaged bad idea ... something that seems great at first and then comes back to bite you." Frank Kozik, the director of the song's music video, interpreted the song as "your average bad-girlfriend experience", an interpretation which Cornell agreed with.

== Release and reception ==
"Pretty Noose" appeared on Billboard magazine's Hot 100 Airplay chart, reaching the top 40. The song peaked at number four on the Billboard Mainstream Rock Tracks chart and number two on the Billboard Modern Rock Tracks chart. It is notable for being the only song by the band to chart higher on the Modern Rock Tracks chart than on the Mainstream Rock Tracks chart. At the 1997 Grammy Awards, "Pretty Noose" received a nomination for Best Hard Rock Performance. Stephen Thomas Erlewine of AllMusic called the song "updated, muscular prog rock". Kerrang! ranked it at eleventh in their list of "The 20 greatest Soundgarden songs" and stated that the song "remains a benchmark for dark, angsty mid-'90s alt.rock."

Outside of the United States, the single was released in the United Kingdom. In Canada, the song reached the top 50 on the Canadian Singles Chart, and later it charted on the Alternative Top 30 chart where it reached number one and became Soundgarden's first single to top that chart. "Pretty Noose" also reached number four on the Canadian Year End Alternative Top 50. "Pretty Noose" reached the UK Top 20 and was the last single from the album which charted in the UK Top 20. "Pretty Noose" peaked at number 14 in Australia. It reached the top 20 in New Zealand and was a top ten success in Finland.

== Music videos ==
The music video for "Pretty Noose" was directed by Frank Kozik. Kozik had previously been known for his work on posters and album art. The video blends animation with various scenes of the band members in a bar, an exotic dancer, Cameron riding a motorcycle, Shepherd being arrested, a tattoo parlor, and Cornell in a bedroom. In the original version of the video, Cornell is shown killing a woman. The video was released in May 1996.

Cornell said of the music video,

It's unlike anything else we've ever done ... In fact, I think it's unlike anything else anyone has ever done. Working with someone like Frank was really interesting because his approach was so fresh—he didn't know the rules that he's supposed to play under. He made the video what it is. It's really interesting and colorful. It's the kind of video that's still fun to look at after you've seen it a few times. That was very important to us. At this point in our lives, part of the challenge is to try new things, not to fall into the pattern of playing it safe. We did that on the video, and we did that on the album too.

MTV refused to show the full video, as it ends with an apparent murder. MuchMusic was given a revised version for its channel. Kozik said that the video was censored because it was "too heavy" for the "dipshits at MTV". He added, "They got a dead girl in that lame Stabbing Westward video so I don't understand their problem."

An alternative international version of the music video for "Pretty Noose" was released. This version was directed by Henry Shepherd (bass guitarist Ben Shepherd's brother), who had previously co-directed the "My Wave" music video for the band. The video simply features the band performing the song live in a studio. The footage is taken from a pre-release European promotional kit for Down on the Upside. The video was released to areas outside the United States, but began to be shown in the United States after Kozik's version debuted.

== Live performances ==
"Pretty Noose" was performed on the season 21 finale of Saturday Night Live on 18 May 1996, hosted by Jim Carrey, in support of Down on the Upside. A recording of this performance is on the band's 2010 compilation album Telephantasm.

== Track listings ==
All songs were written by Chris Cornell, except where noted.

- CD (Europe) and 7-inch vinyl (Europe)
1. "Pretty Noose" – 4:12
2. "Jerry Garcia's Finger" (Matt Cameron, Cornell, Ben Shepherd, Kim Thayil) – 4:00
- Maxi-CD (Europe)
1. "Pretty Noose" – 4:12
2. "Applebite" (Cameron, Cornell) – 5:10
3. "An Unkind" (Shepherd) – 2:08
4. Interview with Eleven's Alain and Natasha – 8:57

== Personnel ==
- Chris Cornell – vocals, rhythm guitar
- Kim Thayil – lead guitar
- Ben Shepherd – bass guitar
- Matt Cameron – drums, percussion

== Charts ==
=== Weekly charts ===
Chart (1996)	Peak position
Australia (ARIA)	22
Australia Alternative (ARIA)	1
Canada Top Singles (RPM)	43
Canada Rock/Alternative (RPM)	1
European Hot 100 Singles (Music & Media)	53
European Alternative Rock Top 25 (Music & Media)	11
Finland (Suomen virallinen lista)	10
Iceland (Íslenski Listinn Topp 40)	9
New Zealand (Recorded Music NZ)	18
Scottish Singles Sales (Official Charts)	36
Sweden (Sverigetopplistan)	42
Switzerland (Schweizer Hitparade)	47
UK Singles (Official Charts)	14
UK Rock & Metal (Official Charts)	1
US Radio Songs (Billboard)	37
US Alternative Airplay (Billboard)	2
US Mainstream Rock (Billboard)	4

Chart (2000)	Peak position
Italy (FIMI)	32

=== Year-end charts ===
Chart (1996)	Position
US Mainstream Rock Tracks (Billboard)	16
US Modern Rock Tracks (Billboard)	32

== Release history ==
Region	Date	Format(s)	Label(s)	Ref.
United States	April 30, 1996	Album rock; modern rock; hard rock; metal; college radio	A&M	
United Kingdom	May 7, 1996	CD	A&M	
United Kingdom	May 13, 1996	7-inch vinyl	A&M	

== See also ==
- List of RPM Rock/Alternative number-one singles (Canada)
