= Fopp (EP) =

EP by Soundgarden
- Released: August 1988
- Venue: Moore Theatre (Seattle)
- Genre: Grunge
- Length: 14:55
- Label: Sub Pop
- Producer: Steve Fisk

Soundgarden chronology
Screaming Life (1987)	Fopp (1988)	Ultramega OK (1988)

Professional ratings
Review scores
Source	Rating
AllMusic	3/5 stars
Spin Alternative Record Guide	3/10

Fopp is the second EP by the American rock band Soundgarden, released in August 1988 through Sub Pop Records. Fopp was later combined with the band's first EP, Screaming Life (1987), and released as the Screaming Life/Fopp compilation album in 1990.

== Recording ==
The EP was recorded at the Moore Theatre in Seattle, Washington, with producer Steve Fisk.

== Music and lyrics ==
The EP contains one Soundgarden original, two covers, and a remix. Guitarist Kim Thayil said of the title track: "That's an Ohio Players song off of Honey—I've had that album since I was in high school. We thought we could take the song and make it AC/DC or something. We'd take the power chords, turn up the volume and make it heavy. "Fopp" is a good song that needed to be given its due as a "kick-ass rock song!" The EP also contains a cover of the Green River song "Swallow My Pride" from the 1985 EP, Come on Down.

== Release and reception ==
Fopp was released on vinyl only, packaged in black die-cut sleeves and limited to 3,000 copies. The album's cover art was photographed by Charles Peterson. Frontman Chris Cornell said, "The second record did pretty well but it wasn't like a sweep, some people didn't like it."

== Track listing ==
No.	Title	Writer(s)	Length
1.	"Fopp"	Billy Beck, Leroy Bonner, Marshall Jones, Ralph Middlebrooks, Marvin Pierce, Clarence Satchell, James Williams	3:37
2.	"Fopp (Fucked Up Heavy dub mix)"	Beck, Bonner, Jones, Middlebrooks, Pierce, Satchell, Williams	6:25
3.	"Kingdom of Come"	Chris Cornell	2:35
4.	"Swallow My Pride"	Steve Turner, Mark Arm	2:18
Total length:			14:55

== Personnel ==
Soundgarden

- Chris Cornell – vocals
- Kim Thayil – guitar
- Hiro Yamamoto – bass
- Matt Cameron – drums

Production

- Drew Canulette – engineering
- Steve Fisk – production, additional electronics
