= Black Rain (Soundgarden song) =

Single by Soundgarden

from the album Telephantasm
- B-side: "Black Rain" (Album version); "Beyond the Wheel" (Live)
- Released: August 17, 2010
- Recorded: 1991, 2010
- Length: 5:25
- Label: A&M
- Composers: Ben Shepherd; Kim Thayil
- Lyricist: Chris Cornell
- Producer: Soundgarden

Soundgarden singles chronology
"Bleed Together" (1997)	"Black Rain" (2010)	"The Telephantasm" (2010)

"Black Rain" is a song by the American rock band Soundgarden. The song features lyrics written by frontman Chris Cornell and music written by bassist Ben Shepherd and guitarist Kim Thayil. It was released on August 17, 2010, as the first single from their compilation album, Telephantasm (2010). The single debuted at No. 24 and No. 14 on Billboard's Alternative Songs and Rock Songs charts, respectively, in August 2010. It is also Soundgarden's only song to chart on the Billboard Hot 100 chart, peaking at No. 96. "Black Rain" was the first single that Soundgarden had released since 1997.

== Origin and recording ==
The song was mostly recorded during sessions for Badmotorfinger in 1991. According to Kim Thayil, it was never properly finished: "There was drums and bass and some rhythm guitar and some scratch vocals and that was about it." The band did not like the original arrangement, but with the "magic of Pro Tools", the song could be re-arranged easily. Thayil said, "[In] many ways, it's a new song." In 2010, the band reworked the original recording with Down on the Upside co-producer Adam Kasper, who was working with the band on archival material. Cornell noted that when they listened to the original recording for the first time after almost two decades, he immediately remembered the problems he had with the song. Cornell explained that the original version of the song was much longer, and that he was unhappy with how it was arranged. He was also dissatisfied with the lyrics in the chorus. After so many years, however, Cornell noted that the issues seemed "easy to resolve". For the new mix, the music was re-arranged, the chorus vocals were re-written and re-recorded by Cornell, and new guitar overdubs were added.

== Composition ==
The verse is notable for mostly being in the time signature 9/4; additional time signatures such as 15/16 and 3/4 also appear. In an interview with USA Today, Cornell said that "Black Rain" captures "that super heavy version (of the band) we were finally realizing to its fullest potential about 1991."

== Release and reception ==
"Black Rain" was nominated for a Grammy Award for Best Hard Rock Performance.

== Music video ==
The music video for the song, the first for Soundgarden in over a decade, premiered on AOL.com on September 20, 2010. It was directed by Brendon Small of Metalocalypse and is the first artist-driven music video to be based on the show. Virtual band Dethklok also make cameo appearances in the video.

== Track listing ==
Radio promo

No.	Title	Length
1.	"Black Rain" (Radio edit)	4:09
2.	"Black Rain" (Album version)	5:24

7" vinyl single included with Super Deluxe versions of Telephantasm

No.	Title	Length
1.	"Black Rain"	5:24
2.	"Beyond the Wheel" (Live at Showbox, 2010)	5:38

== Charts ==
Chart performance for "Black Rain"
Chart (2010)	Peak position
Australia (ARIA)	90
Canada Hot 100 (Billboard)	44
Canada Rock (Billboard)	8
UK Rock & Metal (OCC)	2
US Billboard Hot 100	96
US Hot Rock & Alternative Songs (Billboard)	14
US Mainstream Rock (Billboard)	10
US Alternative Airplay (Billboard)	20
US Rock Digital Song Sales (Billboard)	9
