= Screaming Life =

EP by Soundgarden
- Released: November 21, 1987
- Studio: Reciprocal (Seattle)
- Genres: Grunge; alternative metal; art punk
- Length: 22:16
- Label: Sub Pop
- Producers: Jack Endino; Soundgarden

Soundgarden chronology
6 Songs for Bruce (1985)	Screaming Life (1987)	Fopp (1988)

Singles from Screaming Life
- 1. "Hunted Down" Released: June 1987

Professional ratings
Review scores
Source	Rating
AllMusic	2.5/5 stars
Collector's Guide to Heavy Metal	9/10
Spin Alternative Record Guide	9/10

Screaming Life is the debut EP by American rock band Soundgarden, released in 1987 by Sub Pop. It was later combined with the band's next EP, Fopp (1988), and released as the Screaming Life/Fopp compilation album in 1990.

== Recording ==
The EP was recorded in Seattle, Washington, at Reciprocal Recording with producer Jack Endino, who also produced albums for Nirvana and Mudhoney. The EP was recorded a year prior to its release, and was held up due to financial reasons at Sub Pop.

== Music and lyrics ==
Drummer Matt Cameron described the sound on the EP as "pretty raw". "Hunted Down", Soundgarden's first single, is representative of the early "grunge" sound—with its dirty guitar, dissonant atmosphere and lyrics concerning entrapment and escape. "Nothing to Say" features drop D tuning, which would become a signature of Soundgarden's sound on later albums. Guitarist Kim Thayil said he learned about the tuning from Buzz Osborne of the Melvins, when Osborne was telling him about Black Sabbath.

Earlier versions of "Tears to Forget" appeared on the band's 1985 demo tape and on the 1986 Deep Six compilation album, which featured some of the first recordings by the earliest Seattle grunge bands, including Soundgarden. That version was recorded with drummer Scott Sundquist, but the version on Screaming Life was recorded with Cameron.

== Release and reception ==
The release of the EP was delayed due to financial reasons. Cornell said that the EP was met with rave reviews and that "everybody loved it." "Hunted Down" was Soundgarden's first single and also the first song on Sub Pop's "hold music" tape. According to Thayil, "you would call them up, and when they put you on hold you heard 'Hunted Down'." It was the only single released from the EP. "Nothing to Say" was Soundgarden's first B-side, released on the "Hunted Down" single. The song also appeared on the KCMU compilation tape, Bands That Will Make Money, which was distributed to record companies. Upon hearing the song, record labels began contacting the band, which eventually led to the band signing with A&M Records.

== Packaging ==
The EP's cover art, photographed by Charles Peterson, features a sepia-toned black-and-white photograph of Cornell singing and Thayil playing guitar in the background. The album cover was an attempt by Sub Pop to capitalize on Cornell's image. The first 500 copies of the EP were pressed on transparent orange vinyl; after that, they were released on standard black vinyl. A second pressing was later made, pressed by Erika Records, but still on the Sub Pop label, in black, sea green marble, blue marble, red, pink marble and purple marble vinyl.

== Track listing ==
All lyrics are written by Chris Cornell; all music is composed by Kim Thayil, except where noted.

No.	Title	Music	Length
1.	"Hunted Down"		2:42
2.	"Entering"		4:36
3.	"Tears to Forget"	Thayil, Hiro Yamamoto	2:00
4.	"Nothing to Say"		4:00
5.	"Little Joe"		4:31
6.	"Hand of God"	Yamamoto	4:27
Total length:			22:16

== Outtakes ==
The song "Toy Box" was recorded during the sessions for Screaming Life. It was later featured on the "Flower" single. The instrumental track "The Telephantasm" was recorded mostly during these sessions and was released as a separate single in late 2010 and as an iTunes bonus track on Telephantasm.

== Personnel ==
Soundgarden

- Chris Cornell – vocals
- Kim Thayil – guitar
- Hiro Yamamoto – bass
- Matt Cameron – drums

Production

- Jack Endino – production, engineering
- Soundgarden – production
- Charles Peterson – snapshots
