= Charles Peterson (photographer) =

American photographer (February 2, 1964)

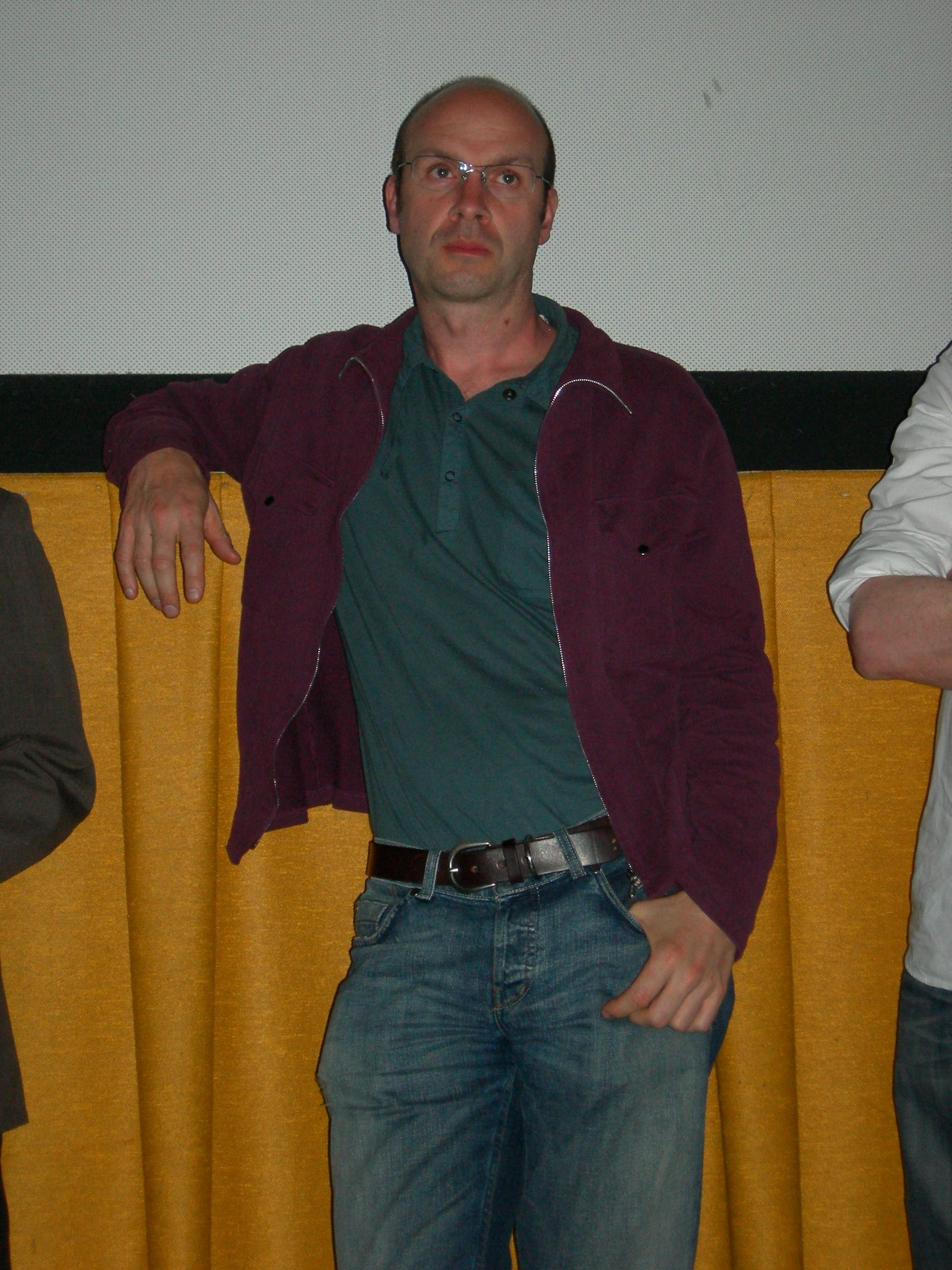
- Peterson at the Seattle International Film Festival in 2007, after a screening of the film Kurt Cobain: About a Son
- Born: 1964 (age 61–62); Longview, Washington, U.S.
- Education: University of Washington, 1987
- Occupation: Photographer
- Writing career
- Subject: Music photography
- Website: www.charlespeterson.net

Charles Peterson (February 2,1964 in Longview, Washington) is an American photographer well known for his work with the Seattle independent record label Sub Pop and for capturing the then-newly emerging grunge scene in images. His photos are presented in the movie Kurt Cobain: About a Son.

Peterson is known for depicting the rise of the Pacific Northwest underground music scene in the late 1980s to early 1990s.

== Personal life ==
Peterson lives in Seattle with his wife, son and daughter.

== Publications ==
- Touch Me I'm Sick, by Jennie Boddy (Author), Eddie Vedder (Author, Introduction), Charles Peterson (Photographer)(PowerHouse, 2003)
- Screaming Life : A Chronicle of the Seattle Music Scene, Charles Peterson (Author, Photographer) (Harper Collins, 1995)
- Pearl Jam: Place/Date, Charles Peterson (Author), Lance Mercer (Author) (Rizzoli/Vitalogy, 1997)
- Cypher, Jeff Chang (Author), Charles Peterson (Photographer), (PowerHouse Books 2008)

== Exhibitions ==
- Chrysler Museum of Art, Norfolk Virginia, February–May 2005
- Seattle's Experience Music Project (EMP)
- Galerie Chappe, Paris "Kurt Cobain, About A Son" November 2008
- Experiencing Nirvana (2014) Camden, UK

== Films ==
- Teen Spirit: The Tribute to Kurt Cobain (1996)
- Hype! (1996)
- All Apologies: Kurt Cobain 10 Years On (2006)
- The Last 48 Hours of Kurt Cobain (2006)
- Seven Ages of Rock (2007)
- Kurt Cobain: Too Young to Die (2012)
- Kurt Cobain: Montage of Heck (2015) (photographs)
