= Hiro Yamamoto =

American musician

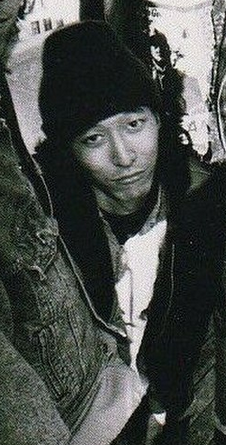
- Yamamoto in a 1987 promo photo

Background information
- Born: Hiro D. Yamamoto; April 13, 1961 (age 65); Seattle, Washington, U.S.
- Origin: Park Forest, Illinois
- Genres: Heavy metal, grunge, alternative metal, garage rock, surf music, exotica
- Occupations: Musician, songwriter
- Instruments: Bass guitar, vocals, guitar
- Years active: 1984–2006; 2008–present
- Labels: Sub Pop, A&M
- Member of: Truly, Stereo Donkey
- Formerly of: Soundgarden

Hiro D. Yamamoto (born April 13, 1961) is an American bassist who was a founding member of grunge band Soundgarden, along with Kim Thayil and Chris Cornell, in 1984. He left the band in 1989; two years later, Yamamoto started the independent rock band Truly together with Screaming Trees drummer Mark Pickerel and Robert Roth from The Storybook Krooks. In 2016, Yamamoto co-founded the surf trio Stereo Donkey. In 2025, Yamamoto was inducted into the Rock and Roll Hall of Fame as a founding member of Soundgarden.

== Soundgarden ==
Hiro Yamamoto is the founding bassist of Soundgarden. He performed with Cornell, Thayil, and drummer Scott Sundquist on the Deep Six compilation, and performed with Cornell, Thayil, and drummer Matt Cameron on the EPs Screaming Life, Fopp, and Loudest Love, as well as on the albums Ultramega OK and Louder Than Love. He departed the band following the spring 1989 European tour. Jason Everman replaced him on the bass briefly, after which Ben Shepherd became the permanent bassist. After Yamamoto departed, he completed the requirements for his master's degree in physical chemistry at Western Washington University. He is currently the Chief of Organic Chemistry at Edge Analytical in Burlington, Washington.

As did Cornell, Thayil, Cameron, and Shepherd, Yamamoto actively wrote songs for the band:

- "Heretic" (first version on Deep Six, second on Loudest Love); lyrics
- "Tears to Forget" (first version on Deep Six, second on Screaming Life); music (co-written)
- "All Your Lies" (first version on Deep Six, second on Ultramega OK); music (co-written)
- "Kingdom of Come" (Fopp); lyrics, music (co-written)
- "665" (Ultramega OK); music
- "667" (Ultramega OK); music
- "Circle of Power" (Ultramega OK); lyrics, vocals
- "Nazi Driver" (Ultramega OK); music
- "Toy Box" (Flower); lyrics, music (co-written)
- "Power Trip" (Louder Than Love); music
- "I Awake" (Louder Than Love); music
- "No Wrong No Right" (Louder Than Love); music

== Truly ==
In 1991, Yamamoto formed the indie rock band Truly. The other members were former Screaming Trees drummer Mark Pickerel and singer Robert Roth (in addition to guitarist Chris Quinn, who left the band after their debut EP). Truly released one EP, two studio albums, and one compilation before breaking up in 2000. The band reunited in 2008.

== Stereo Donkey ==
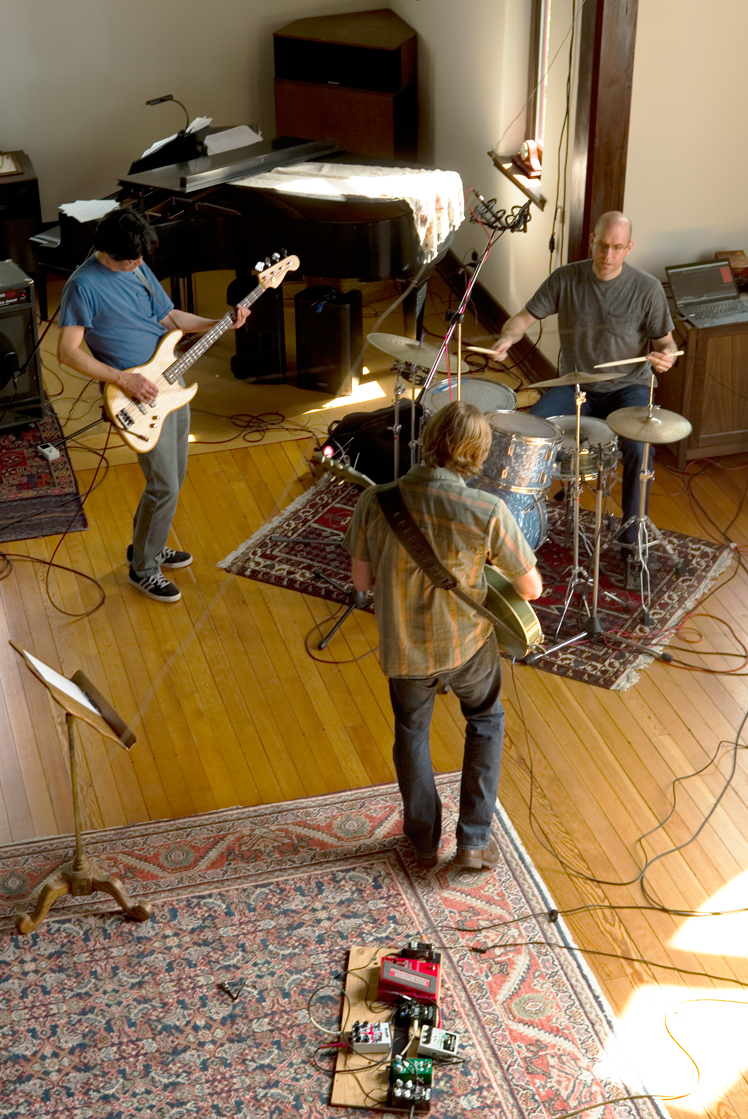
Stereo Donkey in rehearsal, in the former church that is the "fourth member of the band." April 17, 2016.

Following a successful 2016 jam session, Yamamoto formed a surf-inspired trio, Stereo Donkey, with drummer Mike Bajuk, and guitarist Pat Wickline.

In November 2018, the band released an eponymous six-track EP, recorded in the old church that Wickline lives in. According to Wickline, "The room is a fourth member of the band." The recording reportedly works as both surf music and exotica, yet is still rooted in, "Pacific Northwest rock history".

== Other performances ==
On November 8, 2021, Yamamoto performed with other noted musicians at an event in Seattle honoring the Asian Hall of Fame's 2021 inductees, and the 35th anniversary of the Robert Chinn Foundation. The other performers included Jeff Kashiwa, Krist Novoselic, Ed Roth, and Danny Seraphine. Yamamoto himself was inducted into the Asian Hall of Fame in 2022.

On November 8, 2025, Yamamoto joined Kim Thayil, Matt Cameron, Ben Shepherd, Brandi Carlile, Mike McCready, Jerry Cantrell, and Taylor Momsen for Soundgarden's induction into the Rock and Roll Hall of Fame.

== Discography ==
=== Soundgarden ===
- Screaming Life (EP) – 1987
- Fopp (EP) – 1988
- Ultramega OK – 1988
- Flower (single) – 1989
- Louder Than Love – 1989
- Loudest Love (EP) – 1990

=== Truly ===
- Heart and Lungs (EP) – 1991
- Fast Stories... from Kid Coma – 1995
- Feeling You Up – 1997
- Subject to Change: Artists for a Hate-Free America – 1997 compilation
- Twilight Curtains – 2000

=== Stereo Donkey ===
- Stereo Donkey (EP) – 2018
