= Ultramega OK =

1988 studio album by Soundgarden

Studio album by Soundgarden
- Released: October 31, 1988
- Recorded: Spring 1988
- Studios: Dogfish Mobile Unit, Seattle, Washington, and Newberg, Oregon
- Genres: Grunge; alternative metal
- Length: 42:48
- Label: SST
- Producers: Soundgarden; Drew Canulette

Soundgarden chronology
Fopp (1988)	Ultramega OK (1988)	Louder Than Love (1989)

2017 re-release

Singles from Ultramega OK
- 1. "Flower" Released: May 5, 1989

Ultramega OK is the debut studio album by the American rock band Soundgarden, released on October 31, 1988, by SST Records. Following the release of the EPs Screaming Life (1987) and Fopp (1988), both for the Sub Pop record label, Soundgarden signed with SST and went to work on their first full-length release. The resulting album contained elements of psychedelic rock, hard rock, heavy metal and hardcore punk. The band supported the album with a tour in the United States, as well as its first overseas tour.

In 1990, the album earned a Grammy nomination for Best Metal Performance.

== Recording ==
The album was recorded in spring 1988 in Seattle, Washington, and Newberg, Oregon, with producer Drew Canulette. Frontman Chris Cornell said that during the recording sessions the band was not aligned with Canulette. He said, "Material-wise we went through the process that we always do, but the producer wasn't used to the sound we wanted and didn't know what was happening in Seattle."

Later, in a 1995 interview, Cornell admitted "we made a huge mistake with Ultramega OK, because we left our home surroundings and people we'd been involved with and used this producer that really did affect our album in a kind of negative way. The producer was suggested by SST because they could get a good deal. I regret it, because in terms of material, it should have been one of the best records we ever did. It actually slowed down our momentum a little bit because it didn't really sound like us."

Around that same time, veteran Seattle producer Jack Endino, who also produced Soundgarden's first EP, Screaming Life, began the process of remixing the album, and actually completed a rough mix of "Flower". But, due to the band wanting to move on and the financial costs involved with re-pressing and redistributing the record, it was put on hold. The project resumed in 2014 by Jack Endino and Kim Thayil, and was completed in 2017.

== Music and lyrics ==
Ultramega OK has elements of 1960s psychedelic rock, 1970s hard rock and heavy metal, and 1980s hardcore punk. Drummer Matt Cameron said that the band tried to refine its sound while still trying to keep an edge. Steve Huey of AllMusic said the album is the "best expression of Soundgarden's early, Stooges/MC5-meets-Zeppelin/Sabbath sound", and added that it is "a dark, murky, buzzing record that simultaneously subverts and pays tribute to heavy metal".

Guitarist Kim Thayil recalls "Flower" as being the first time he blew across his guitar strings. This can be heard during the song's introduction, when they are played in rhythm with the drums. "Circle of Power" was one of the few Soundgarden songs to be written without any input from Cornell, as it was written by Thayil and bassist Hiro Yamamoto. It is also the only Soundgarden song on which Yamamoto performs lead vocals.

"Smokestack Lightning" is a Howlin' Wolf cover. On the original version of the album, "Smokestack Lightning" segued into a distorted excerpt from the Sonic Youth song, "Death Valley '69". Soundgarden included it as a tribute/parody of Sonic Youth's similar sampling of the Stooges song "Not Right" on their Bad Moon Rising album. This excerpt was removed from the 2017 reissue of Ultramega OK.

Cornell said that "Flower" is "about a girl... who becomes a woman and basically invests everything in vanity and then burns out quick." Thayil stated that "Nazi Driver" is about "cutting up Nazis and making stew out of them". Cornell observed that the lyrics and vocals for "Incessant Mace" are "very European Gothic".

Three songs on the album were recorded as jokes or parodies by the band. The songs "665" and "667" are parodies of the idea of Satanic content in rock music, the idea being that if 666 is such a powerful number, then the surrounding numbers must be equally as powerful. The album's closing track, "One Minute of Silence", is a "cover" of John Lennon's "Two Minutes Silence" from the 1969 album, Unfinished Music No.2: Life with the Lions, excluding Yoko Ono's part. Cornell said that the band "appreciated the Lennon arrangement so much". No instruments are played, although the band (presumably) can be faintly heard in the background. Cornell stated, "We were trying real hard to shut up, but Kim couldn't possibly shut up for a whole minute."

== Release and reception ==
Professional ratings
Review scores
Source	Rating
AllMusic	4/5 stars
Collector's Guide to Heavy Metal	9/10
Kerrang!	4.5/5 stars
The Rolling Stone Album Guide	3/5 stars
Spin Alternative Record Guide	7/10

Cornell said, "On [Ultramega OK] the production wasn't what we were after at all, and that sort of hurt us critically." AllMusic staff writer Steve Huey wrote: "It may not be quite as complex or consistent as some of Soundgarden's later albums, but Ultramega OK is easily the best document of grunge's early, pre-Nirvana days."

"Flower" was the only single released from the album. Its music video, directed by Mark Miremont, aired regularly on MTV's 120 Minutes, helping to call attention to the early Seattle grunge scene.

At the 1990 Grammy Awards, Ultramega OK received a nomination for Best Metal Performance.

== Packaging and title ==
The album's cover art, photographed by Lance Mercer, features a black and white picture of the band. According to Cornell, the album's title was a joke conceived by Thayil. Cornell explained that the title Ultramega OK means "absolutely, unbelievably not bad," and suggested that the British version was going to be called Ultramega UK. Cornell explained the title further, stating, "With Ultramega OK we really liked the songs on that record but we were disappointed in the production. We were sort of making fun of the finished product. It was Ultramega Alright. Ultramega could have been better but not bad."

== Tour ==
Soundgarden supported the album with a tour in the United States in the spring of 1989 and a tour in Europe, which began in May 1989 and was the band's first overseas tour.

== Reissues ==
Ultramega OK was reissued on LP in 2012. "One Minute of Silence" was not included on it.

A new reissue of Ultramega OK was released on March 10, 2017, on Sub Pop in four formats, namely, black and colored double LP, CD, cassette tape, and digital download. The album was fully remixed and remastered from the original tapes by Jack Endino. It includes, as bonus tracks, six early eight-track versions of songs from the same album, taken from a demo tape, informally called the Ultramega EP by the band members, recorded by Endino and Chris Hanzsek at Reciprocal Recording in 1987.

== Track listing ==
All lyrics are written by Chris Cornell, except where noted.

No.	Title	Lyrics	Music	Length
1.	"Flower"		Kim Thayil	3:25
2.	"All Your Lies"		Thayil, Hiro Yamamoto	3:51
3.	"665"		Yamamoto	1:37
4.	"Beyond the Wheel"		Cornell	4:20
5.	"667"		Yamamoto	0:56
6.	"Mood for Trouble"		Cornell	4:21
7.	"Circle of Power"	Yamamoto	Thayil	2:05
8.	"He Didn't"		Matt Cameron	2:47
9.	"Smokestack Lightning" (Howlin' Wolf cover)	Chester Burnett	Burnett	5:07
10.	"Nazi Driver"		Yamamoto	3:52
11.	"Head Injury"		Cornell	2:22
12.	"Incessant Mace"		Thayil	6:27
13.	"One Minute of Silence"	(Instrumental)	John Lennon	1:02
Total length:				42:48

2017 expanded reissue
No.	Title	Length
1.	"Flower"	3:26
2.	"All Your Lies"	3:49
3.	"665"	1:38
4.	"Beyond the Wheel"	4:22
5.	"667"	0:56
6.	"Mood for Trouble"	4:20
7.	"Circle of Power"	2:04
8.	"He Didn't"	2:47
9.	"Smokestack Lightning"	4:36
10.	"Nazi Driver"	3:52
11.	"Head Injury"	2:20
12.	"Incessant Mace"	6:21
13.	"One Minute of Silence"	1:02
14.	"Head Injury" (Early version)	2:59
15.	"Beyond the Wheel" (Early version)	4:55
16.	"Incessant Mace" (Early version)	6:22
17.	"He Didn't" (Early version)	2:54
18.	"All Your Lies" (Early version)	3:45
19.	"Incessant Mace V2" (Early version)	7:49
Total length:		1:10:17

== Personnel ==
All credits for Ultramega OK are adapted from the album's liner notes.

Soundgarden

- Chris Cornell – vocals; additional guitar ("Mood for Trouble", "He Didn't", "Smokestack Lightning"); bass ("Circle of Power")
- Kim Thayil – lead guitar
- Hiro Yamamoto – bass; vocals ("Circle of Power")
- Matt Cameron – drums

Production

- Soundgarden – production, art direction and design
- Drew Canulette – production, engineering
- Lance Limbocker – engineering
- Kathryn Miller – art direction and design
- Lance Mercer – cover photo
- Sydney Taylor – insert photo
- Gardener – back cover photo of Chris Cornell

== Charts ==
Chart (2017)	Peak position
US Vinyl Albums (Billboard)	8
US Tastemaker Albums (Billboard)	9
Belgian Albums (Ultratop Wallonia)	122
