= Live on I-5 =

Live album by Soundgarden
- Released: March 22, 2011
- Recorded: November 30 – December 18, 1996
- Venue: Del Mar Fairgrounds (Del Mar); Oakland-Alameda County Coliseum Arena (Oakland); Pacific Coliseum (Vancouver); Salem Armory Auditorium (Salem); Mercer Arena (Seattle)
- Genre: Alternative metal; grunge; alternative rock; heavy metal
- Length: 77:57
- Label: A&M
- Producer: Adam Kasper

Soundgarden chronology
Telephantasm (2010)	Live on I-5 (2011)	King Animal (2012)

Professional ratings
Aggregate scores
Source	Rating
Metacritic	57/100
Review scores
Source	Rating
AllMusic	3/5 stars
Drowned in Sound	6/10
Pitchfork	2.6/10

Live on I-5 is the debut live album by the American rock band Soundgarden. It was recorded during the West Coast leg of their 1996 tour and released on March 22, 2011. The band announced the release on their official website on January 13, 2011.

The title references Interstate 5, which runs along the West Coast of the United States. The band hired producer Adam Kasper to record several shows using a rented 24-track mobile recording truck. Although they planned to release the live material shortly after the tour concluded, the band disbanded, leaving the multi-track tapes shelved at Studio X (then known as Bad Animals Studio). A live performance of "Blow Up the Outside World" was made available as a 256 kbps MP3 download for customers who pre-ordered the album.

== Track listing ==
All tracks are written by Chris Cornell, except where noted.

No.	Title	Writer(s)	Length
1.	"Spoonman"		4:23
2.	"Searching with My Good Eye Closed"		4:12
3.	"Let Me Drown"		4:10
4.	"Head Down"	Ben Shepherd	6:25
5.	"Outshined"		5:13
6.	"Rusty Cage"		4:13
7.	"Burden in My Hand"		5:02
8.	"Helter Skelter"	Lennon-McCartney	2:09
9.	"Boot Camp"		3:16
10.	"Nothing to Say"	Cornell; Kim Thayil	4:25
11.	"Slaves & Bulldozers"	Cornell; Shepherd	9:15
12.	"Dusty"	Cornell; Shepherd	4:32
13.	"Fell on Black Days"		4:54
14.	"Search and Destroy"	Iggy Pop; James Williamson	3:09
15.	"Ty Cobb"	Cornell; Shepherd	2:42
16.	"Black Hole Sun"		3:00
17.	"Jesus Christ Pose"	Matt Cameron; Cornell; Shepherd; Thayil	6:23
Total length:			77:57

Pre-order bonus track
No.	Title	Length
18.	"Blow Up the Outside World"	6:10

Pre-order bonus CD: Before the Doors: Live on I-5
No.	Title	Writer(s)	Length
1.	"No Attention" (Oakland sound check)		4:16
2.	"Never the Machine Forever" (Oakland sound check)	Thayil	3:32
3.	"Waiting for the Sun" (Oakland sound check)	Jim Morrison	4:12
4.	"Room a Thousand Years Wide" (Vancouver B.C. sound check)	Thayil; Cameron	3:38
5.	"Somewhere" (Sacramento sound check)	Shepherd	4:05

Best Buy bonus DVD – Lollapalooza 2010
No.	Title	Writer(s)	Length
1.	"Searching with My Good Eye Closed"
2.	"Let Me Drown"
3.	"Face Pollution"	Cornell; Shepherd

Notes

- Tracks 1–3, 5, 8–9, 15 and 18 recorded on November 30, 1996, at Del Mar Fairgrounds in Del Mar, California
- Tracks 4, 10, and 14 recorded on December 18, 1996, at Mercer Arena in Seattle, Washington
- Track 6 recorded on December 7, 1996, at Pacific National Exhibition Forum in Vancouver, British Columbia
- Track 7 recorded on December 8, 1996, at Salem Armory in Salem, Oregon
- Tracks 11–13, 17 recorded on December 5, 1996, at Henry J. Kaiser Convention Center in Oakland, California
- Track 16 recorded on December 17, 1996, at Mercer Arena in Seattle, Washington

Pre–order bonus CD:

- Tracks 1–3 recorded on December 5, 1996, at the Henry J. Kaiser Convention Center in Oakland, California
- Track 4 recorded on December 7, 1996, at the Pacific National Exhibition Forum in Vancouver, British Columbia
- Track 5 recorded on December 4, 1996, at the Memorial Audiotorium in Sacramento, California

Best Buy bonus DVD:

- Tracks 1–3 recorded on August 8, 2010, at the Lollapalooza Festival in Chicago, Illinois

Notes

- Tracks 1–3, 5, 8–9, 15 and 18 recorded on November 30, 1996, at Del Mar Fairgrounds in Del Mar, California
- Tracks 4, 10, and 14 recorded on December 18, 1996, at Mercer Arena in Seattle, Washington
- Track 6 recorded on December 7, 1996, at Pacific National Exhibition Forum in Vancouver, British Columbia
- Track 7 recorded on December 8, 1996, at Salem Armory in Salem, Oregon
- Tracks 11–13, 17 recorded on December 5, 1996, at Henry J. Kaiser Convention Center in Oakland, California
- Track 16 recorded on December 17, 1996, at Mercer Arena in Seattle, Washington

Pre–order bonus CD

- Tracks 1–3 recorded on December 5, 1996, at the Henry J. Kaiser Convention Center in Oakland, California
- Track 4 recorded on December 7, 1996, at the Pacific National Exhibition Forum in Vancouver, British Columbia
- Track 5 recorded on December 4, 1996, at the Memorial Audiotorium in Sacramento, California

Best Buy bonus DVD

- Tracks 1–3 recorded on August 8, 2010, at the Lollapalooza Festival in Chicago, Illinois

== Personnel ==
Soundgarden

- Matt Cameron – drums, backing vocals
- Chris Cornell – lead vocals, rhythm guitar
- Ben Shepherd – bass, backing vocals (on "Spoonman")
- Kim Thayil – lead guitar

== Charts ==
Chart (2011)	Peak position
US Billboard 200	47
US Top Hard Rock Albums (Billboard)	2
US Top Rock Albums (Billboard)	14
US Tastemaker Albums (Billboard)	13
US Vinyl Albums (Billboard)	5
