= Outshined =

Single by Soundgarden

from the album Badmotorfinger
- B-side: "I Don't Care About You"; "Can You See Me"
- Released: November 1991
- Genre: Grunge; hard rock; heavy metal
- Length: 5:11
- Label: A&M
- Songwriter: Chris Cornell
- Producer: Terry Date

Soundgarden singles chronology
| "Jesus Christ Pose" (1991) | "Outshined" (1991) | "Rusty Cage" (1992) |

Music videos
- "Outshined" on YouTube; "Outshined (Alternate Version)" on YouTube

"Outshined" is a song by American rock band Soundgarden. Written by the band's frontman Chris Cornell, the song was released as the second single from their third studio album, Badmotorfinger (1991). It became the band's first single to reach Billboard's Album Rock Tracks chart, where it peaked at number 45. It was included on Soundgarden's 1997 greatest hits album, A-Sides, the 2010 compilation album, Telephantasm and the live album Live on I-5.

== Composition ==
"Outshined" is a grunge and hard rock song, written in D major by frontman Chris Cornell and is performed in drop D tuning. The verses are in 7/4 time, an unorthodox meter which the band would also later use in "Spoonman". Guitarist Kim Thayil has said that Soundgarden usually did not consider the time signature of a song until after the band had written it, and said that the use of odd meters was "a total accident."

== Lyrics ==
In an interview, Cornell said, "I've never really been biographical in my lyrics, so when I wrote a line like 'I'm looking California and feeling Minnesota' from 'Outshined', it just felt refreshing." Cornell on the song:

I don't know how everyone else feels ... but I definitely go through periods of extreme self-confidence, feeling like I can do anything. Perhaps a fan will sense that, like in a performance, and the hero image creeps out. But then someone will say something, however insignificant, or I'll get something in my head and, all of a sudden, I'm plummeting in the opposite direction, I'm a piece of shit, and I really can't do anything about it. That's where "Outshined" comes from, and why I'll never consider myself a hero.

Cornell explained the song's most famous lines: "I'm looking California/And feeling Minnesota", in an interview with Details magazine in 1996:

One of the first times I remember writing something personal was on tour. I was feeling really freaky and down, and I looked in the mirror and I was wearing a red T-shirt and some baggy tennis shorts. I remember thinking that as bummed as I felt, I looked like some beach kid. And then I came up with that line—'I'm looking California / And feeling Minnesota,' from the song 'Outshined'—and as soon as I wrote it down, I thought it was the dumbest thing. But after the record came out and we went on tour, everybody would be screaming along with that particular line when it came up in the song. That was a shock. How could anyone know that that was one of the most personally specific things I had ever written? It was just a tiny line. But somehow, maybe because it was personal, it just pushed that button.

== Release and reception ==
"Outshined" was released as a single in 1991 in various versions with the previously unreleased B-sides "Cold Bitch", "I Can't Give You Anything", "Girl U Want", "Show Me", "I Don't Care About You", "Can You See Me", and "Homicidal Suicidal". Outside the United States, the single was released commercially in Germany, the Netherlands, and the United Kingdom.

"Outshined" became an instant hit and a fan favorite, and gained considerable airtime on alternative rock radio stations. "Outshined" features one of the most memorable Soundgarden lyrics, "I'm looking California, and feeling Minnesota". The lyric "feeling Minnesota" has also been used by ESPN anchor Stuart Scott in reference to Kevin Garnett, who spent the first 11 years of his career as a player for the Minnesota Timberwolves.

Steve Huey of AllMusic called the song a "steadily creeping rocker with a main riff that strongly recalled the heavy murk of prime Black Sabbath". He added, "It's a powerful re-imagining of what the Sabbath sound can represent, and the song's encapsulation of early-'90s angst and directionlessness helps make it one of the definitive grunge anthems." Billboard and Kerrang! both named "Outshined" as Soundgarden's second-greatest song, behind "Fell on Black Days" and "Black Hole Sun", respectively.

== Music video ==
There are two versions of the video, a U.S./international version and a Canadian version.

=== Official video ===
The music video for "Outshined" was produced by Jonathan Dayton and Valerie Faris and directed by Matt Mahurin, who would later direct the music video for "The Day I Tried to Live". The video features the band performing the song in a steel mill. The video was released in December 1991. It is a fan favorite and gained considerable airtime on MTV, yet the band members themselves disliked it. According to Cornell, Mahurin was too busy concentrating on Metallica's video for "The Unforgiven" while working on the video for "Outshined".

Cornell on the music video:

[Matt Mahurin] does people on the street, social underbelly crap, but it's pretend underbelly. The clip was in the MTV Buzz-bin for a few weeks and then it fell off. About two months later he sent us the real cut, and it was fantastic, way better than the one that got on the air. It was frustrating. The unseen version was dangerous; the released version was a standard hard rock video. He kind of winged it, he was too busy with Metallica.

Thayil on the music video:

All I can remember is that they cut the guitar solo to make the video 'single-length'. I thought that was a stupid thing. Here we are, a guitar band, and the guitar solo—it may not be a great guitar solo—was edited out just for the video. That's ridiculous. It was a heavy song and our most popular video, even though it was a crap video. It never kicks in or explodes; there's no dynamics. The band never loosens up and explores the riff because the solo was taken out.

In another interview, Thayil said:

It was Buzz Bin at MTV and got played a lot. I think when it was in Buzz Bin, simultaneously Nirvana's "Smells Like Teen Spirit" and Pearl Jam's "Alive" were also in 'Buzz Bin' and they were also from Seattle, so maybe we were a little bit overshadowed—a little bit 'outshined' at that point! I didn't like our video either—it stunk! It was a last minute thing. I believe it was the couple who made that Smashing Pumpkins video where they were on the moon and stuff. Well, this was one of their early videos—and I hated it! That's what I remember most about that song—just how much I couldn't stand the video!

=== Canadian version ===
An alternate version of the music video for "Outshined" was shown on Canadian television. The video features the band performing the song in a yellow-lit studio.

== Live performances ==
A performance of "Outshined" can be found on the Motorvision home video release.

At the 1992 Lollapalooza in Bremerton, Washington, Pearl Jam frontman Eddie Vedder joined the band and did backing vocals for the song.

== Track listings ==
All songs were written by Chris Cornell except where noted.

CD (Germany)

1. "Outshined" (edit) – 4:07
2. "Outshined" – 5:11
3. "Girl U Want" (Gerald Casale, Mark Mothersbaugh) – 3:29
4. "Show Me" (Shepherd) – 2:47
5. "Into the Void (Sealth)" (Chief Sealth, Ozzy Osbourne, Tony Iommi, Geezer Butler, Bill Ward) – 6:37

7-inch vinyl (UK)

1. "Outshined" – 5:11
2. "I Can't Give You Anything" (Dee Dee Ramone) – 2:16

CD (The Netherlands)

1. "Outshined" (edit) – 4:07
2. "I Don't Care About You" (Fear) – 1:55
3. "Can You See Me" (Jimi Hendrix) – 2:40
4. "Outshined" – 5:11

CD (Australasia)

1. "Outshined" (edit) – 4:07
2. "Cold Bitch" – 5:01

== Personnel ==
- Chris Cornell – vocals, rhythm guitar
- Kim Thayil – lead guitar
- Ben Shepherd – bass
- Matt Cameron – drums

== Charts ==
1992 weekly chart performance for "Outshined"
| Chart (1992) | Peak position |
|---|---|
| Australia (ARIA) | 76 |
| Australia Alternative (ARIA) | 8 |
| UK Singles (Official Charts) | 50 |
| US Mainstream Rock (Billboard) | 45 |

2017 weekly chart performance for "Outshined"
| Chart (2017) | Peak position |
|---|---|
| US Hot Rock & Alternative Songs (Billboard) | 24 |
| US Rock Digital Song Sales (Billboard) | 16 |

== Certifications ==
Certifications for "Outshined"
| Region | Certification | Certified units/sales |
|---|---|---|
| New Zealand (RMNZ) | Gold | 15,000^{‡} |
^{‡} Sales+streaming figures based on certification alone.

== Release history ==
Release dates and formats for "Outshined"
| Region | Date | Format(s) | Label(s) | Ref. |
|---|---|---|---|---|
| United States | November 1991 | Radio | A&M | |
| Australia | May 27, 1992 | CD; cassette | A&M | |
| United Kingdom | November 9, 1992 | 7-inch vinyl; 12-inch vinyl; CD | A&M | |
