= Slaves & Bulldozers =

Song by Soundgarden

from the album Badmotorfinger
- Released: October 8, 1991
- Recorded: 1991
- Genre: Grunge; doom metal
- Length: 6:55
- Label: A&M
- Composers: Chris Cornell; Ben Shepherd
- Lyricist: Chris Cornell
- Producers: Terry Date; Soundgarden

"Slaves & Bulldozers" is a song by American rock band Soundgarden. It is the third track on the band's third studio album, Badmotorfinger, released in 1991.

== Origin and recording ==
The song features lyrics written by Chris Cornell and music co-written by Cornell and bassist Ben Shepherd. According to guitarist Kim Thayil, "Slaves & Bulldozers" was the second song (after "Flower") in which he blew across his guitar strings:

That's the second song we did where I blow on the guitar. I'd do it live and people would think I was playing with my tongue or my teeth or my beard. 'Hey look, he's playing guitar with his beard!' No, I was blowing on it - making a wish!

Kim Thayil said that the song's guitar solo is one of his favorites. Kim Thayil on the guitar solo:

One of my favourite solos with the band is on "Slaves & Bulldozers". When our A&R guy came in we played it to him, and he was like, 'This is finished? Huh? C'mon guys.' I just said, 'You don't get it, do you? That's it, finished!' To me it's great - it seems free, it's real kinetic, it gives the song this great jarring feel..."Slaves & Bulldozers" live is when I'm real free. I just approach the fretboard with a 'what do I do now?' attitude. Sometimes it's great, sometimes it doesn't work. That's what music is like.

== Composition ==
Like most of its parent album, "Slaves & Bulldozers" contains drop-tuned guitars. The song is described as a doom metal track, that builds up over time with Cornell's voice getting louder with each verse. Pitchfork describes Thayil's guitar playing as him "strangulating his guitar strings for spasms of noise that almost seem to emanate from an inhuman source". The song displays Cornell's vocals switching from a blues rock style to a heavy metal style. Ben Shepherd's contributions, one of which included this song, helped make (according to Thayil) Badmotorfinger faster and weirder.

== Reception ==
Though never released as a single, the song has been applauded for Chris Cornell's outstanding vocals on it. Producer Rick Rubin played the song for the former instrumentalist members of Rage Against the Machine, to showcase Cornell's strong vocal ability before he joined them to form Audioslave. In a fan poll conducted by Revolver, "Slaves & Bulldozers" was voted the second best of Chris Cornell's vocal performances. Ultimate Guitar named the song as one of Cornell's most unforgettable vocal performances comparing the build-up technique in the second verse to that of Prince with his song "Purple Rain". In 2017, Billboard placed the song at No. 5 on their list of "The 15 Greatest Soundgarden Songs", and in 2021, Kerrang! ranked the song at No. 12 on their list of "The 20 greatest Soundgarden songs". Also in 2017, Loudwire named Cornell's final song of his final performance, "Slaves & Bulldozers", as the vocalist's most unforgettable moment.

== Live performances ==
"Slaves & Bulldozers" is notable for being the last song Soundgarden ever played live, closing out their final show at the Fox Theatre on May 17, 2017, followed by a cover of the Led Zeppelin song "In My Time of Dying". Cornell died within a few hours after the show.

A performance of the song is included on the Motorvision home video release. This was included in the 2016 reissue of Badmotorfinger. The reissue also includes live versions of the song from the Paramount Theatre, the 1992 edition of Pinkpop Festival, and their Seattle performance on July 12, 1992.

== Personnel ==
- Chris Cornell – vocals, rhythm guitar
- Kim Thayil – lead guitar
- Ben Shepherd – bass
- Matt Cameron – drums
