= Room a Thousand Years Wide =

1990 single by Soundgarden

Single by Soundgarden

from the album Badmotorfinger
- B-side: "H.I.V. Baby"
- Released: October 1990
- Recorded: 1990
- Genre: Grunge; alternative metal; doom metal
- Length: 4:15
- Label: Sub Pop
- Composer: Matt Cameron
- Lyricist: Kim Thayil
- Producer: Soundgarden

Soundgarden singles chronology
"Hands All Over" (1989)	"Room a Thousand Years Wide" (1990)	"Jesus Christ Pose" (1991)

"Room a Thousand Years Wide" is a song by the American rock band Soundgarden. With lyrics written by guitarist Kim Thayil and music written by drummer Matt Cameron, the song was released as a single in 1990 by Sub Pop. A re-recorded version later appeared on their third album, Badmotorfinger (1991).

== Origin and recording ==
"Room a Thousand Years Wide" is one of the few Soundgarden songs written without any input from frontman Chris Cornell. Kim Thayil wrote the words and Matt Cameron composed the music. It was also the first Soundgarden song to be recorded and released with bassist Ben Shepherd. Both the original and re-recorded version of the song that is featured on Badmotorfinger include a horn section featuring Scott Granlund (saxophone) and Ernst Long (trumpet). The song is in 6/4 time.

== Lyrics ==
Thayil on "Room a Thousand Years Wide":

I really liked the music to the song and it needed words, and since no one else pursued it, I decided to. It's not really about things that have actually happened to me. It's more about experience in general. I've heard a lot of good ideas from people telling me what it's about. They said it's about God, Satan, Jesus, Satan, both, it's religious, it isn't religious ... The truth is, it's just me.

== Release ==
"Room a Thousand Years Wide" was released as a single in 1990 with a previously unreleased B-side titled "H.I.V. Baby". It was released as a 7-inch through Sub Pop's Single of the Month club a full year before the release of Badmotorfinger. The original version recorded for Sub Pop appears on the Deluxe Edition of the band's 2010 compilation album, Telephantasm.

== Live performances ==
A performance of the song can be found on the Motorvision home video release.

== Track listing ==
No.	Title	Lyrics	Music	Length
1.	"Room a Thousand Years Wide"	Kim Thayil	Matt Cameron	4:15
2.	"H.I.V. Baby"	Chris Cornell	Ben Shepherd	4:58

== Personnel ==
Soundgarden

- Chris Cornell – vocals, rhythm guitar
- Kim Thayil – lead guitar
- Ben Shepherd – bass
- Matt Cameron – drums

Additional personnel

- Scott Granlund – saxophone
- Ernst Long – trumpet
