= Badmotorfinger =

- Standard cover art. Some 1991 pressings opt for a yellow-green color scheme.

Studio album by Soundgarden
- Released: October 8, 1991
- Recorded: Early 1991
- Studios: Studio D (Sausalito); Bear Creek (Woodinville); A&M (Hollywood)
- Genres: Grunge; alternative metal; heavy metal; hard rock; progressive rock
- Length: 57:42
- Label: A&M
- Producers: Terry Date; Soundgarden

Soundgarden chronology
Louder Than Love (1989)	Badmotorfinger (1991)	Superunknown (1994)

2016 re-release

Singles from Badmotorfinger
- 1. "Jesus Christ Pose" Released: September 1991; 2. "Outshined" Released: November 1991; 3. "Rusty Cage" Released: March 1992

Badmotorfinger is the third studio album by American rock band Soundgarden, released on October 8, 1991, through A&M Records. Soundgarden began the recording sessions for the album with new bassist Ben Shepherd in early 1991. The album maintained the band's heavy metal sound, while featuring an increased focus on songwriting compared to the band's previous releases. AllMusic considered the album's music to be "surprisingly cerebral and arty"; alternative tunings and odd time signatures were present on several of the album's songs, and lyrics were intended to be ambiguous and evocative.

The focus on the Seattle grunge scene helped bring attention to Badmotorfinger, and the singles "Outshined" and "Rusty Cage" found a major audience in rock radio and MTV. Badmotorfinger became the band's highest charting album at the time on the Billboard 200, where it peaked at number 39. The album received critical acclaim, citing the significant improvements over earlier releases and evolution in the band's sound. Soundgarden supported the album with tours of North America and Europe, including opening for Guns N' Roses on the Use Your Illusion Tour. In 1992, Badmotorfinger was nominated for the Grammy Award for Best Metal Performance. It was certified double platinum by the Recording Industry Association of America in 1996.

== Writing ==
Badmotorfinger has been classified by various critics as grunge, alternative metal, heavy metal and hard rock. Steve Huey of AllMusic said the songwriting on the album "takes a quantum leap in focus and consistency", adding: "It's surprisingly cerebral and arty music for a band courting mainstream metal audiences, but it attacks with scientific precision." Guitarist Kim Thayil jokingly called it the "Heavy Metal White Album". Frontman Chris Cornell said, "I think there's songs on the new record which are almost more commercially viable because they have that memorable feel to them, and I think if anyone expected us to come out and make something more commercial than Louder Than Love [the band's previous album], then I'm glad that they were surprised." He added that the album was more representative of how the band was live.

Compared with Louder Than Love, the band took a more collaborative approach to the writing process for Badmotorfinger. It was Soundgarden's first album with bassist Ben Shepherd, who replaced Jason Everman in April 1990, and Cornell said Shepherd brought a "fresh and creative" approach to the recording sessions, while the band as a whole said his knowledge of music and writing skills redefined the group. Before joining, Soundgarden had been Shepherd's favorite band. Shepherd contributed the song "Somewhere" and collaborated on the musical composition of several other songs on the album, as did Thayil and drummer Matt Cameron. Thayil said Shepherd's contributions helped make the album "faster" and "weirder".

Several of the album's songs utilize alternative tunings, such as "Rusty Cage", "Searching with My Good Eye Closed", and "Holy Water", on all of which the bottom E string of the guitars is tuned down to B. "Mind Riot" also uses an alternative tuning on which every string is tuned to one of several octaves of E. There are also some unusual time signatures on the album: "Outshined" is partially in 7/4, while "Face Pollution" is in 9/8. Thayil claimed the band did not deliberately pursue unusual meters, stating they were instead the result of a "push to get the quirkiness out of things".

Regarding the lyrics, Cornell said he tried not to get too specific and was more interested in letting ambiguity "create colourful images." Thayil compared listening to the album to "reading a novel [about] man's conflict with himself and society, or the government, or his family, or the economy". Cornell noted that "Outshined" is about shifting from "periods of extreme self-confidence" to "plummeting in the opposite direction". "Jesus Christ Pose" was written about public figures who exploit the symbol of Jesus' crucifixion to suggest they are persecuted by the public. Thayil wrote the lyrics for "Room a Thousand Years Wide", stating the song is about "experience in general". "Holy Water" was written about people who force their beliefs onto others, and "New Damage" subtly criticizes the right-wing government of the United States.

== Recording ==
The album was recorded in early 1991 at Studio D in Sausalito, California, Bear Creek Studios in Woodinville, Washington, and A&M Studios in Los Angeles, California. Soundgarden chose to work with producer Terry Date, as it had on Louder Than Love, because, according to Cornell, the band had a good relationship with Date and did not want to go through the pressure of trying to find a new producer. One example of the innovative techniques used to record the album is that, for the opening song, "Rusty Cage", Thayil used a wah pedal as an audio filter, which resulted in an unusual guitar sound he said produced a guitar riff that "almost sounds backward".

== Outtakes ==
"Cold Bitch", which was one of Shepherd's favorite songs the band recorded, was featured on the Australasia "Outshined" single in 1992, while "She's a Politician" first appeared on the EP Satan Oscillate My Metallic Sonatas (or SOMMS) released June 28, 1992. The song "Birth Ritual" was worked on during the Badmotorfinger recording sessions, but was not completed. The finished version would eventually see release on the Singles soundtrack in 1992, and later, on both the Telephantasm (2010) and Echo of Miles: Scattered Tracks Across the Path (2014) compilations.

"No Attention", which later appeared on the band's 1996 album, Down on the Upside, was attempted during the Badmotorfinger recording sessions, but "did not work" according to Thayil. "Black Rain" was mostly recorded during the sessions, but the vocals were never completed. It was eventually finished in 2010 and released on Telephantasm and Echo of Miles: Scattered Tracks Across the Path. Three additional tracks were discarded during the mixing process, two of which were named "A Broom" and "How Should I Know?"

Although Badmotorfinger's singles featured plenty of B-sides, none of these were from the recording sessions for the album. A one-day recording session with Stuart Hallerman yielded "Stray Cat Blues", "Into the Void (Sealth)", "Girl U Want", "Show Me", and "Touch Me".

== Artwork and title ==
The Badmotorfinger logo on the cover of the album was drawn by guitarist Mark Dancey of the Sub Pop band Big Chief and consists of a jagged, cyclone-like design, in the center of which is a triangle that has the album's title along the interior perimeter and a spark plug in the middle. Thayil suggested the title Badmotorfinger as a joke on the Montrose song "Bad Motor Scooter" and said, regarding the title: "It was sort of off the top of my head. I simply like it because it was colorful. It was kinda aggressive, too ... It conjures up a lot of different kinds of images. We like the ambiguity in it, the way it sounded and the way it looked."

== Release and reception ==
Professional ratings
Review scores
Source	Rating
AllMusic	4.5/5 stars
Blender	4/5 stars
Christgau's Consumer Guide	B−
Entertainment Weekly	B+
Los Angeles Times	3.5/4 stars
Mojo	4/5 stars
NME	8/10
Pitchfork	8.3/10
The Rolling Stone Album Guide	4.5/5 stars
Spin	4/5 stars

Badmotorfinger was scheduled for release on September 24, 1991, but A&M Records pushed it back to October 8 due to "production problems." Coming a month and a half after Pearl Jam's Ten and just weeks after Nirvana's Nevermind and Red Hot Chili Peppers' Blood Sugar Sex Magik (both of which were released on September 24), it has been credited with helping to break alternative rock and grunge into the mainstream. Although overshadowed at the time of its release by the sudden popularity of Nevermind, the attention that album brought to the Seattle music scene helped Soundgarden get broader exposure, and Badmotorfinger peaked at number 39 on the Billboard 200 album chart on February 29, 1992. It was among the 100 top selling albums of 1992, sold a million copies in the early 1990s, and was certified platinum by the RIAA in January 1993.

The album included the singles "Jesus Christ Pose", "Outshined", and "Rusty Cage", which gained considerable airtime on alternative rock radio stations. The music videos for "Outshined" and "Rusty Cage" gained considerable airtime on MTV, but the video for "Jesus Christ Pose", the album's lead single, was removed from MTV's playlist amidst widespread controversy over the perceived anti-Christian message of the song and video. Promotion of the song also precipitated death threats against the band while they were on tour to support the album in the United Kingdom.

In a contemporary review for Spin, Lauren Spencer hailed Badmotorfinger as a "garden of sound" that drew on older hard rock influences without sounding "derivative". Entertainment Weekly critic Gina Arnold commended Soundgarden for writing more engagingly than their contemporaries, "who seldom get beyond extolling booze, girls, and cars". She concluded in her review that the record was more "stylishly bombastic rather than bludgeoningly bombastic. Tuneless heavy metal is, after all, still tuneless heavy metal, and in that department, Soundgarden are as functional as they make 'em." Writing for NME, Keith Cameron said that the band had found "a cool balance" between Cornell's "bluesy screams" and Thayil's "brutish riff powerplay" on Badmotorfinger, rendering the album more "stripped down, lithe and lethal" than Louder Than Love. Dave Hill of The Indianapolis Star writes that the album "is, in stretches, deliciously sardonic and consistently bombastic, and its sense for metaphors is wondrous," whilst noting that "such sophisticated songwriting might be way over the heads of the kids who make up the headbanging legions." Retrospectively, AllMusic staff-writer Steve Huey deemed Badmotorfinger "heavy, challenging hard rock full of intellectual sensibility and complex band interplay", while Ann Powers of Blender commented that "Cornell strikes the perfect Jesus Christ pose on this sonic wallop". Robert Christgau was less enthusiastic, finding it "credible" as a metal record because of Thayil's impressive use of guitar noise, but less impressive lyrically, writing: "Chris Cornell howls on about 'lookin for the paradigm' and 'your Jesus Christ pose' (I swear, that's the good stuff)".

At the 1992 Grammy Awards, Badmotorfinger received a nomination for Best Metal Performance. That same year, the album won a Northwest Area Music Award for Best Metal Album.

It was ranked number 45 in the October 2006 issue of Guitar World on the magazine's list of the 100 greatest guitar albums of all time. Also, in April 2019, was ranked number 2 on Rolling Stone's "50 Greatest Grunge Albums" list.

Buzz Osborne, whose band Melvins had a massive influence on grunge, called Badmotorfinger his favorite grunge album of all time, praising its sophistication and complex structures. In 2010, singer Greg Puciato named "Room a Thousand Years Wide" his favorite song.

In 2022, Pitchfork included the album on its list of "The 25 Best Grunge Albums of the '90s".

== 25th anniversary reissues (2016) ==
The 25th anniversary reissue of Badmotorfinger was released in two deluxe formats:

- The "Deluxe Edition" is a two-CD package featuring a remastered version of the album on the first disc, with studio outtakes and live tracks from a 1992 performance at Seattle's Paramount Theatre on the second.
- The "Super Deluxe Edition" is a seven-disc box set. It includes the remastered album on disc one, studio outtakes on disc two, and the Paramount Theatre live audio spread across discs three and four. Disc five is a DVD of that same concert, while disc six features Motorvision—a 1992 concert film documenting the Paramount show alongside other live tracks and the album's three promotional music videos. Disc seven contains a 5.1 surround sound mix of the album on Blu-ray Audio. The set was packaged with various collectors' items, and the first 1,000 pre-orders included an exclusive 7-inch vinyl reissue of the "Jesus Christ Pose" single.

A 2-LP gatefold of the album was also made available, with a limited edition of 1,000 produced using silver-colored vinyl.

The Badmotorfinger reissue was created using a backup digital audio tape safety copy of the album, as the original master tapes were damaged or destroyed in the 2008 Universal Studios fire, which affected the label group's tape vault and purportedly destroyed material from hundreds of other recording artists. According to a document filed as part of a class action lawsuit Soundgarden and other artists brought against UMG as a result of the fire, the label made the band aware in May 2015 that the original half-inch master tape of Badmotorfinger had been destroyed and was unavailable for use on the remaster project.

== Tour ==
Following the release of Badmotorfinger, Soundgarden went on a tour in North America through October and November 1991. Following this tour, they were selected by Guns N' Roses for an opening slot on their Use Your Illusion Tour. After this, Soundgarden took a slot opening for Skid Row in North America in February 1992 on their Slave to the Grind tour. Soundgarden then headed to Europe for a month-long headlining theater tour before returning to tour in the United States. They rejoined Guns N' Roses and the Use Your Illusion Tour in the summer of 1992 for a tour of Europe along with fellow opening act Faith No More. Regarding the time spent opening for Guns N' Roses, Cornell said: "It wasn't a whole lot of fun going out in front of 40,000 people for 35 minutes every day. Most of them hadn't heard our songs and didn't care about them. It was a bizarre thing." The band would go on to play the 1992 Lollapalooza tour with the Red Hot Chili Peppers and Pearl Jam, among others. They later released Motorvision, which was filmed at the Paramount Theatre in 1992.

== Track listing ==
=== Original release ===
All lyrics are written by Chris Cornell, except where noted.

No.	Title	Lyrics	Music	Length
1.	"Rusty Cage"		Cornell	4:26
2.	"Outshined"		Cornell	5:10
3.	"Slaves & Bulldozers"		Ben Shepherd; Cornell	6:55
4.	"Jesus Christ Pose"		Matt Cameron; Shepherd; Kim Thayil; Cornell	5:50
5.	"Face Pollution"		Shepherd	2:23
6.	"Somewhere"	Shepherd	Shepherd	4:20
7.	"Searching with My Good Eye Closed"		Cornell	6:31
8.	"Room a Thousand Years Wide"	Thayil	Cameron	4:05
9.	"Mind Riot"		Cornell	4:49
10.	"Drawing Flies"		Cameron	2:26
11.	"Holy Water"		Cornell	5:07
12.	"New Damage"		Thayil; Cameron	5:40
Total length:				57:42

=== Satanoscillatemymetallicsonatas EP ===
In anticipation of the band's appearance on the 1992 Lollapalooza tour, a limited edition of Badmotorfinger was released on June 28, 1992, with a second disc containing the EP Satan Oscillate My Metallic Sonatas (or SOMMS).This EP includes three covers, an unreleased original song, and a live version of "Slaves & Bulldozers". For the cover of Black Sabbath's "Into the Void", the original lyrics were replaced with words of protest by Chief Seattle (also known as Sealth), which fit the meter of the song. At the 1993 Grammy Awards, "Into the Void (Sealth)" received a nomination for Best Metal Performance.

Satanoscillatemymetallicsonatas was reissued on purple 12" vinyl for Record Store Day on November 25, 2016.

No.	Title	Writer(s)	Length
1.	"Into the Void (Sealth)"	Chief Seattle, Tony Iommi, Ozzy Osbourne, Geezer Butler, Bill Ward (music)	6:37
2.	"Girl U Want"	Gerald Casale; Mark Mothersbaugh	3:29
3.	"Stray Cat Blues"	Mick Jagger, Keith Richards	4:46
4.	"She's a Politician"	Cornell	1:48
5.	"Slaves & Bulldozers" (live)	Cornell; Shepherd	8:38
Total length:			25:12

== Personnel ==
Soundgarden

- Chris Cornell – vocals, rhythm guitar
- Kim Thayil – lead guitar
- Ben Shepherd – bass
- Matt Cameron – drums

Additional personnel

- Scott Granlund – saxophone on "Room a Thousand Years Wide" and "Drawing Flies"
- Ernst Long – trumpet on "Face Pollution", "Room a Thousand Years Wide", and "Drawing Flies"
- Damon Stewart – narration on "Searching with My Good Eye Closed"

Artwork

- Mark Dancey – front cover illustration
- Walberg Design – design
- Michael Lavine – photography
- Len Peltier – art direction

Production

- Terry Date – production, engineering
- Soundgarden – production
- Larry Brewer – production assistance
- Efren Herrera – assistance
- John Jackson – assistance
- Ron St. Germain – mixing
- Howie Weinberg – mastering
- Susan Silver – management

== Charts ==
=== Weekly charts ===
Chart (1992)	Peak position
Australian Albums (ARIA)	54
Canada Top Albums/CDs (RPM)	50
UK Albums (Official Charts)	39
US Billboard 200	39

Chart (1994)	Peak position
New Zealand Albums (RMNZ)	16

Chart (2016)	Peak position
US Tastemaker Albums (Billboard)	8

Chart (2017)	Peak position
Australian Albums (ARIA)	27
Canadian Albums (Billboard)	72
Irish Albums (IRMA)	85
Portuguese Albums (AFP)	50
US Digital Albums (Billboard)	23
US Hard Rock Albums (Billboard)	6
US Top Album Sales (Billboard)	33
US Top Catalog Albums (Billboard)	7
US Top Rock Albums (Billboard)	13
US Vinyl Albums (Billboard)	12

=== Year-end charts ===
Chart (1992)	Position
US Billboard 200	86

=== Singles ===
Year	Single	Peak position		
Year	Single	US Main. Rock	AUS	UK
1991	"Jesus Christ Pose"	—	—	30
1991	"Outshined"	45	76	50
1992	"Rusty Cage"	—	80	41
"—" denotes releases that did not chart or were not released in that country.

== Certifications ==
Region	Certification	Certified units/sales
Australia (ARIA)	Gold	35,000^{^}
Canada (Music Canada)	Platinum	100,000^{^}
New Zealand (RMNZ)	Platinum	15,000^{^}
United Kingdom (BPI)	Gold	100,000^{‡}
United States (RIAA)	2× Platinum	2,000,000^{^}
^{^} Shipments figures based on certification alone.^{‡} Sales+streaming figures based on certification alone.

== Accolades ==
Publication	Country	Accolade	Year	Rank
Guitar World	United States	"100 Greatest Guitar Albums of All Time"	2006	45
Revolver	United States	"The 69 Greatest Metal Albums of All Time"	2002	26
Kerrang!	United Kingdom	"100 Albums You Must Hear Before You Die"	1998	25
Visions	Germany	"The Most Important Albums of the 90s"	1999	3
Juice	Australia	"The 100 (+34) Greatest Albums of the 90s"	1999	48
The Movement	New Zealand	"The 101 Best Albums of the 90s"	2004	84
