= Motorvision =

Video by Soundgarden
- Released: November 17, 1992
- Recorded: March 5–6, 1992
- Venue: Paramount Theatre (Seattle, Washington)
- Genre: Grunge; alternative metal; heavy metal
- Length: 57:00
- Label: A&M
- Director: Kevin Kerslake

Soundgarden chronology
Louder Than Live (1990)	Motorvision (1992)

Professional ratings
Review scores
Source	Rating
AllMusic	3/5 stars

Motorvision is a home video by the American rock band Soundgarden. It was released on November 17, 1992.

== Overview ==
It features eight songs performed live at the Paramount Theatre in Seattle, Washington on March 5 and 6, 1992, during the Badmotorfinger tour. AllMusic gave it three out of a possible five stars. AllMusic staff writer Greg Prato said, "Motorvision is an excellent sample of Soundgarden in concert." Motorvision was originally released on VHS only.

An official DVD version was finally made available, with various live videos added as extras, in November 2016 as part of the Badmotorfinger 25th anniversary Super Deluxe edition box set.

The video features candid footage of the band and people associated with it, including Sub Pop co-founders Bruce Pavitt and Jonathan Poneman. Before the first song begins, the band is introduced on stage by a clown, J. P. Patches. The performance of "Slaves & Bulldozers" includes lyrics from Pearl Jam's "Alive" and The Doobie Brothers' "Jesus Is Just Alright".

== Track listing ==
1. "Searching with My Good Eye Closed"
2. "Rusty Cage"
3. "Outshined"
4. "Little Joe"
5. "Mind Riot"
6. "Room a Thousand Years Wide"
7. "Jesus Christ Pose"
8. "Slaves & Bulldozers"

== Personnel ==
Soundgarden

- Matt Cameron – drums
- Chris Cornell – lead vocals, rhythm guitar (2, 4, 5, 7 & 8)
- Ben Shepherd – bass
- Kim Thayil – lead guitar

With

- Scott Granlund – tenor saxophone
- Denney Goodhew – baritone saxophone

Production

- Kevin Kerslake – film director

== Charts ==
Chart (1993)	Position
Australia Music Videos (ARIA)	16
US Top Music Videos (Billboard)	25

Chart (1994)	Position
Australia Music Videos (ARIA)	14
