= Jesus Christ Pose =

Single by Soundgarden

from the album Badmotorfinger
- B-side: "Stray Cat Blues" "Into the Void (Sealth)" "Somewhere"
- Released: September 1991
- Recorded: Spring 1991
- Genre: Grunge; alternative metal
- Length: 5:51
- Label: A&M
- Composers: Matt Cameron; Chris Cornell; Ben Shepherd; Kim Thayil
- Lyricist: Chris Cornell
- Producers: Terry Date; Soundgarden

Soundgarden singles chronology
"Room a Thousand Years Wide" (1990)	"Jesus Christ Pose" (1991)	"Outshined" (1991)

Music video
- "Jesus Christ Pose" on YouTube

"Jesus Christ Pose" is a song by the American rock band Soundgarden, released as the first single from the band's third studio album, Badmotorfinger (1991). The song was included on Soundgarden's 1997 greatest hits album, A-Sides.

== Origin and recording ==
"Jesus Christ Pose" features lyrics written by frontman Chris Cornell and music co-written by Cornell, drummer Matt Cameron, bassist Ben Shepherd, and guitarist Kim Thayil. Some see the song as defining the "essence" of Soundgarden, as it is credited to all four band members. Cameron said, "As soon as I played this pattern everyone dove right in, and within an hour we had the guts of the song. The approach we took on this one was pure assault of the senses. Canadians dance to this song."

According to a Rolling Stone interview, Kim Thayil explained the origin of this song:

[It] was definitely a jam at rehearsal. I think Ben was just jamming up this loud and blurry, detuned bass line flopping around there. And Matt starts making it precise and coherent; Matt's drum part is insane – it's so fast and coordinated. And I picked up my guitar, thinking, "What the hell are they doing?" It took me a while to figure out what's going on rhythmically and where to punctuate the one, so what I start hearing is that swirling, kamikaze bat [guitar] sound at the beginning. And that was a groove. Then I revisit the feedback and beneath-the-bridge guitar squeals that I used to do in '84 and '85. I did that mostly out of necessity because I really didn't understand what it was Ben and Matt were playing; it was just too fast and involved. Eventually, Matt and Ben lost each other, so we recorded it. Chris takes it home. We loved the groove, the action and dynamic of it. So Chris takes a recording home and works lyrics and around the lyrics finds a chorus. So he writes a couple other sections to help flesh out the arrangement dynamic and give room for the vocals. He brought that to rehearsal and we're like, "Holy shit, this crazy, insane car wreck is now a song."

== Composition ==
"Jesus Christ Pose" sample
The song "starts with a kind of free-jazz throwdown and moves quickly into the realm of rockdom."

Musically, "Jesus Christ Pose" has been described as grunge and alternative metal. It was performed in the key of D minor, with the guitars in drop D tuning, in 4/4 time at a tempo of 134 beats per minute. Regarding the song, Thayil said, "The song's groove reminds me of helicopter blades. I bent the strings at the beginning and end of the song." The band explained that the lyrics for "Jesus Christ Pose" concern the exploitation of religion for personal benefit. The song is a criticism of how public figures use religion, particularly the image of Jesus Christ, to portray themselves as being "better" than others, or as "martyrs". Chris Cornell specifically mentioned Jane's Addiction's frontman Perry Farrell as an influence on the song, explaining, "It became fashionable to be the sort of persecuted-deity guy." In an interview with Spin magazine in 1992, Cornell explained the term "Jesus Christ Pose":

You just see it a lot with really beautiful people, or famous people, exploiting that symbol as to imply that they're either a deity or persecuted somehow by their public. So it's pretty much a song that is nonreligious but expressing being irritated by seeing that. It's not that I would ever be offended by what someone would do with that symbol.

== Release and reception ==
"Jesus Christ Pose" was released as a single in 1991 in various versions with the previously unreleased B-sides "Stray Cat Blues" and "Into the Void (Sealth)".

Greg Prato of AllMusic said, "In addition to Cornell's biting lyrics and vocals, the rest of the band helped fuel unquestionably one of Soundgarden's most vicious and venomous rockers. Breakneck guitar riffs do battle with sledgehammer drumming for most of the song's five minute and 50 seconds." Gina Arnold of Entertainment Weekly stated, "On songs like the cynical 'Jesus Christ Pose' ... Soundgarden sound a hell of a lot smarter than their peers, who seldom get beyond extolling booze, girls, and cars."

A live performance of "Jesus Christ Pose" can be found on the "Black Hole Sun" single and the compilation album Telephantasm. A performance of the song is also included on the Motorvision home video release.

== Music video ==
The music video for "Jesus Christ Pose" was directed by Eric Zimmerman, who would later direct the music video for "Rusty Cage". The video's intro adapts John 3:16; "And God So Loved Soundgarden He Gave Them His Only Song". The video features the band members wandering around a desert interspersed with various images of crosses, cyborgs, a crucified girl, a crucified skeleton and even vegetables crucified in human form. Thayil said, "A lot was chosen by the director Eric Zimmerman, and we checked it out and decided what we liked and didn't like." Cornell said, "It was a pretty unanimous decision by the band to have a woman being crucified in the video ... As a visual, it's powerful and it's also challenging to people, because women basically have been persecuted since before recorded history, and it would almost make more sense than seeing a man on it." He also added, "There's upside down crosses and right-side up ones. But there's certainly no blatant direction as far as religious conviction in the video."

Thayil said that the video was one of the few Soundgarden videos the band was satisfied with. He stated that "on the "Jesus Christ Pose" video we did a lot of experimenting at different kinda fun, cool things. I guess it seems fun to me because I didn't end up getting disappointed by it." The video was released in October 1991.

=== Controversy ===
"Jesus Christ Pose" garnered attention when MTV banned its corresponding music video in 1991—the channel has not shown it in its entirety since. The song and its video outraged many listeners, who perceived it as anti-Christian, resulting in the band receiving death threats because of it during a UK tour in the early 1990s. Thayil stated that the song and video "never got any airplay because of the references to Jesus. And MTV wouldn't play the video because they didn't like the idea of a girl on the cross. There are no guitars in the video at all. There's not even a picture of a guitar in the video. It's like this hard, rock-fast, punk-metal video that has no instruments in the whole thing. And it's a six minute video!" Cornell additionally attributed the video's lack of airtime due to its length, comparing MTV's programming at the time to that of a commercial radio station.

== Track listing ==
Promotional CD (US) and 12" vinyl (UK)

1. "Jesus Christ Pose" (Matt Cameron, Chris Cornell, Ben Shepherd, Kim Thayil) – 5:51

12" vinyl (UK)

1. "Jesus Christ Pose" (Cameron, Cornell, Shepherd, Thayil) – 5:51
2. "Stray Cat Blues" (Mick Jagger, Keith Richards) – 4:46

12" vinyl (UK), CD (UK), and 12" vinyl (UK)

1. "Jesus Christ Pose" (Cameron, Cornell, Shepherd, Thayil) – 5:51
2. "Stray Cat Blues" (Jagger, Richards) – 4:46
3. "Into the Void (Sealth)" (Chief Sealth, Ozzy Osbourne, Tony Iommi, Geezer Butler, Bill Ward) – 6:37
4. "Somewhere" (Shepherd) – 4:21

Promotional 7" vinyl (US) and promotional 12" vinyl (US)

1. "Jesus Christ Pose" (Cameron, Cornell, Shepherd, Thayil) – 5:51
2. "Drawing Flies" (Cameron, Cornell) – 2:25

== Personnel ==
- Chris Cornell – vocals, rhythm guitar
- Kim Thayil – lead guitar
- Ben Shepherd – bass
- Matt Cameron – drums

== Charts ==
Chart performance for "Jesus Christ Pose"
Chart (1992)	Peak position
UK Singles (Official Charts)	30

== Accolades ==
Publication	Country	Accolade	Year	Rank
Kerrang!	United Kingdom	"666 Songs You Must Own (Grunge)"	2004	2
Q	United Kingdom	"The Ultimate Music Collection"	2005	*

* denotes an unordered list

== Release history ==
Release dates and formats for "Jesus Christ Pose"
Region	Date	Format(s)	Label(s)	Ref.
United States	September 1991	—N/a	A&M	
United Kingdom	April 6, 1992	12-inch vinyl	A&M	
