= Gibson ES-140 =

Electric guitar model

- Manufacturer: Gibson
- Period: 1950–1968 (1950-1957, thinline version: 1956-1968)

Construction
- Body type: Hollow
- Neck joint: Set
- Scale: 22.75"

Woods
- Body: Maple, Poplar, Maple laminate
- Neck: Mahogany
- Fretboard: Rosewood

Hardware
- Pickup: one single-coil P90

Colors available
- Sunburst, Natural

The Gibson ES-140 is an electric guitar manufactured by the Gibson Guitar Corporation from 1950 to 1968. The ES-140 was designed to be a student model guitar targeted towards younger players and players with smaller hands. It is 3/4 scale hollow-body guitar with a single pick up. It may be seen as a scaled-down version of the Gibson ES-175; like the ES-175 it had an all-laminate construction, which allowed the cost of materials and construction to be kept down, as well as assisting in keeping feedback at higher volumes manageable.

The ES-140T is a thinline version of the full-depth ES-140. In 1956 it replaced the original ES-140.
