= Rusty Cage =

1992 single by Soundgarden

Single by Soundgarden

from the album Badmotorfinger
- B-side: "Big Bottom"/"Earache My Eye" (live)
- Released: March 1992
- Recorded: March–April 1991
- Genre: Grunge; alternative metal
- Length: 4:26
- Label: A&M
- Songwriter: Chris Cornell
- Producers: Terry Date, Soundgarden

Soundgarden singles chronology
"Outshined" (1991)	"Rusty Cage" (1992)	"Spoonman" (1994)

Music video
- "Rusty Cage" on YouTube

"Rusty Cage" is a song by the American rock band Soundgarden. Written by frontman Chris Cornell, "Rusty Cage" was released in 1992 as the third single from the band's third studio album, Badmotorfinger (1991). The song became an instant hit and was released as a single in several different formats. The song was included on Soundgarden's 1997 greatest hits album, A-Sides, and the 2010 compilation album Telephantasm.

== Origin and recording ==
"Rusty Cage" was written by frontman Chris Cornell. Guitarist Kim Thayil on the song:

The tuning on that song was pretty nutty. It's recorded with a wah wah in the low position used as a filter. That was the first time we did anything like that. It was Chris's idea; he wanted to get that weird tone that you can't really dial in on an amp. But if you use the wah wah as a filter, it gets an incredibly weird sound. And if you listen to that riff, especially if you've heard the original demos of it, it almost sounds backward.

== Composition ==
On "Rusty Cage" the bottom E string is tuned all the way down to B, with Thayil stating that "the string was all wobbly but it had a good effect". The song features a striking tempo change towards the end of the song. The phrasing and meter also change: the first part of the song is in 4/4 but the second, slower, part is in an irregular, recurring metric pattern containing nineteen beats that could be interpreted various ways: either as 4 bars of 3/4 followed by one bar of 2/4, followed by a bar of 3/4 and a bar of 2/4 (3+3+3+3+2+3+2), or as 3+3+3+5+5, or even as one long bar of 19/4 or 19/8. Thayil has said that Soundgarden usually did not consider the time signature of a song until after the band had written it, and said that the use of odd meters was "a total accident".

== Release and reception ==
"Rusty Cage" was released as a single in 1992 in various versions with a previously unreleased B-side titled "Touch Me". Outside the United States, the single was released commercially in Australia, Germany, the Netherlands, and the United Kingdom. The song gained considerable airtime on alternative rock radio stations.

In 2017, Billboard ranked the song number nine on their list of the 15 greatest Soundgarden songs, and in 2021, Kerrang ranked the song number eight on their list of the 20 greatest Soundgarden songs.

"Rusty Cage" was part of the soundtrack of the 1994 bike racing game, Road Rash, which received 3DO's 1994 "Soundtrack of the Year" award. The song appeared on the fictional radio station "Radio X" in the 2004 video game Grand Theft Auto: San Andreas. However, these versions are all 1 minute and 43 seconds shorter than the album version. The majority of these versions end as the breakdown at the end of the song comes in. It is also featured in the 2008 racing game, Burnout Paradise, where the full version is intact. The song is a part of Soundgarden's compilation album Telephantasm DLC Pack for Guitar Hero: Warriors of Rock. The song was added to the Rock Band 3 downloadable content catalog on July 19, 2011. The Johnny Cash version also appears in the Mob of the Dead zombies map in Call of Duty: Black Ops II's Uprising downloadable content. Like previous songs in the Call of Duty series' DLC, it is triggered by activating objects in the environment. It also appeared on the official trailer for Prey 2, which was later cancelled. Toyota also used the song for the 2014 Corolla advertisement.

== Music video ==
The music video for "Rusty Cage" was directed by Eric Zimmerman, who had previously directed the "Jesus Christ Pose" music video for the band. The video features Soundgarden performing the song in a white room amid scenes of the band members being chased through a forest by dogs, farmers, and a man in a truck. The video was released in March 1992. It gained considerable airtime on MTV.

== Live performances ==
A performance of "Rusty Cage" can be found on the Motorvision home video release.

== Track listing ==
All songs written by Chris Cornell, except where noted:

Promotional CD (US) and Promotional 12" Vinyl (UK)

1. "Rusty Cage" (edit) – 3:52
2. "Rusty Cage" – 4:26

Promotional CD (US)

1. "Rusty Cage" (edit) – 3:52
2. "Rusty Cage" – 4:26
3. "Girl U Want" (Gerald Casale, Mark Mothersbaugh) – 3:29
4. "Show Me" (Shepherd) – 2:47

CD (Australia, Germany, and UK)

1. "Rusty Cage" (edit) – 3:52
2. "Rusty Cage" – 4:26
3. "Touch Me" (Fancy) – 2:51
4. "Stray Cat Blues" (Mick Jagger, Keith Richards) – 4:46

12" Vinyl (UK)

1. "Rusty Cage" (edit) – 3:52
2. "Touch Me" (Fancy) – 2:51
3. "Show Me" (Shepherd) – 2:47

7" Vinyl (UK)

1. "Rusty Cage" – 4:26
2. "Touch Me" (Fancy) – 2:51
  - Lead vocals by Stephanie (Barber) Fairweather
- The vinyl is a limited edition of 5000. Also released as an etched green CD in a Digipak (5000 copies), a picture 7" (5000 copies) and a cassette single.

CD (The Netherlands)

1. "Rusty Cage" (edit) – 3:52
2. "Big Bottom"/"Earache My Eye" (live) (Spinal Tap)/(Tommy Chong, Gaye DeLorme, Richard Marin) – 10:46
  - Recorded live on December 10, 1989 at the Whisky a Go Go in Los Angeles, California.

== Personnel ==
- Chris Cornell – vocals, rhythm guitar
- Kim Thayil – lead guitar
- Ben Shepherd – bass
- Matt Cameron – drums

== Charts ==
Chart performance for "Rusty Cage"
Chart (1992)	Peak position
Australia (ARIA)	80
Australia Alternative (ARIA)	4
UK Singles (Official Charts)	41

== Release history ==
Release dates and formats for "Rusty Cage"
Region	Date	Format(s)	Label(s)	Ref.
United States	March 1992	—N/a	A&M	
United Kingdom	June 8, 1992	7-inch vinyl; 12-inch vinyl; CD; CD digipack	A&M	

== Johnny Cash version ==
"Rusty Cage"

Single by Johnny Cash

from the album Unchained
- Released: 1996
- Recorded: 1995
- Genre: Gothic country; country rock; blues rock; hard rock
- Length: 2:56
- Label: American Recordings
- Songwriter: Chris Cornell
- Producer: Rick Rubin

Johnny Cash singles chronology
"Drive On" (1994)	"Rusty Cage" (1996)	"The Man Comes Around" (2002)

"Rusty Cage" was covered by American country singer Johnny Cash on his 1996 album, Unchained, which won a Grammy Award for Best Country Album, and Cash's version earned him a Grammy nomination for Best Male Country Vocal Performance. During at least three live performances by Soundgarden (July 21, 1996, in Knoxville, Tennessee, at Forks In The River, early November 1996 at the Aragon Ballroom in Chicago, Illinois, and at Soundgarden's last pre-breakup show at the Blaisdell Arena, Honolulu, Hawaii, on February 9, 1997), Cornell introduced the song with a dedication to Cash. On Cornell's Higher Truth acoustic tour in late 2015, he started including "Rusty Cage" in the set-list, employing Cash's country-rock arrangement of the song.
