= Into the Void (Black Sabbath song) =

Song by Black Sabbath

Song by Black Sabbath

from the album Master of Reality
- Released: 21 July 1971
- Studio: Record Plant, Los Angeles, California
- Genre: Heavy metal • doom metal
- Length: 6:11
- Label: Vertigo
- Songwriters: Tony Iommi, Ozzy Osbourne, Geezer Butler, Bill Ward
- Producer: Rodger Bain

"Into the Void" is a song by English heavy metal band Black Sabbath, released in 1971 on their album Master of Reality. An early version of "Into the Void" called "Spanish Sid" was released on the deluxe edition of Master of Reality.

"Into the Void" was ranked the 13th best Black Sabbath song by Rock - Das Gesamtwerk der größten Rock-Acts im Check.

== Influence ==
"Into the Void" has been listed as a favorite song by some of heavy metal's most notable performers. James Hetfield from Metallica lists "Into the Void" as his favorite Black Sabbath track. Eddie Van Halen listed the song's main riff as one of his all-time favorites. Washington, D.C. hardcore punk band Void took their name from the song.

Soundgarden covered the song, replacing the original lyrics with words of protest by Chief Seattle, which fit the metre of the song. At the 35th Annual Grammy Awards, the appropriately renamed "Into the Void (Sealth)" received a nomination for Best Metal Performance.
