= Soundgarden =

American rock band

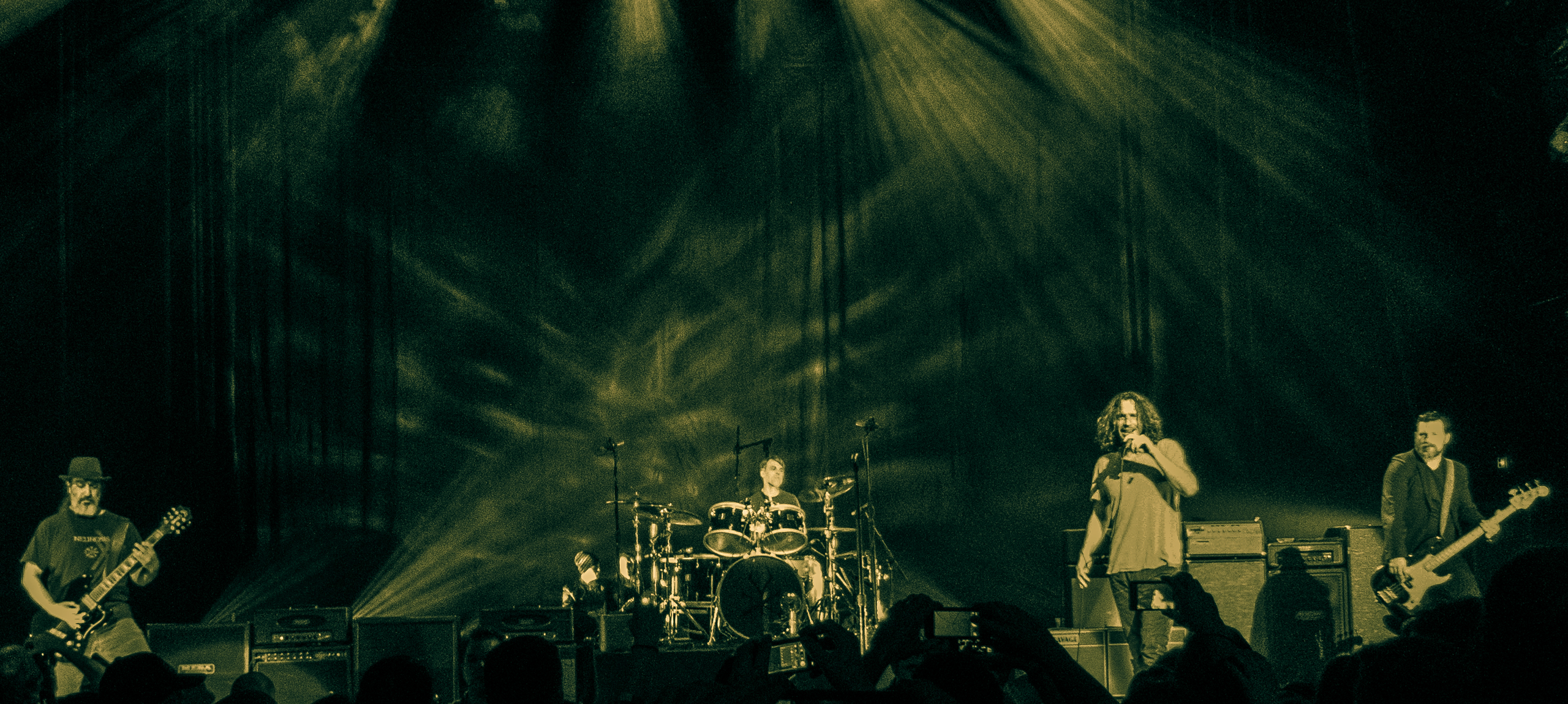
- Soundgarden performing in February 2013. From left to right: Kim Thayil, Matt Cameron, Chris Cornell and Ben Shepherd.

Background information
- Also known as: Nudedragons
- Origin: Seattle, Washington, United States
- Genres: Grunge; heavy metal; alternative metal; alternative rock
- Works: Discography; songs
- Years active: 1984–1997; 2010–2017; 2019; 2025–2026
- Labels: Sub Pop; SST; A&M; Interscope; Seven Four; Republic; Vertigo
- Spinoffs: Audioslave; Hater; Temple of the Dog; Wellwater Conspiracy
- Past members: Chris Cornell; Kim Thayil; Matt Cameron; Hiro Yamamoto; Scott Sundquist; Jason Everman; Ben Shepherd
- Website: soundgardenworld.com

Soundgarden was an American rock band formed in Seattle, Washington, in 1984 by singer and drummer Chris Cornell and bassist Hiro Yamamoto, who then recruited lead guitarist Kim Thayil. Scott Sundquist was brought in to play drums in 1985 so that Cornell could focus solely on vocals. Sundquist was replaced on drums by Matt Cameron in the following year. Yamamoto left in 1989 and was replaced initially by Jason Everman and shortly thereafter by Ben Shepherd. Soundgarden disbanded in 1997 and reformed in 2010. Following Cornell's death in 2017, Thayil declared in October 2018 that Soundgarden had disbanded once again.

Soundgarden was one of the pioneers of grunge music, a style of alternative rock that developed in the American Pacific Northwest in the mid-1980s, and helped to popularize it in the early 1990s, alongside such Seattle contemporaries as Alice in Chains, Pearl Jam, and Nirvana. They were the first of a number of grunge bands to sign to the Seattle-based record label Sub Pop, through which they released two EPs: Screaming Life (1987) and Fopp (1988). Soundgarden's debut album, Ultramega OK, was also released in 1988 by the Los Angeles-based independent label SST Records; although the album did not sell well nationally, it garnered critical acclaim and the band's first Grammy Award nomination. Soundgarden was the first grunge band to be signed to a major label when they signed to A&M Records in 1988. The release of their second album, Louder Than Love (1989), was the band's first album to enter the Billboard 200 chart, peaking at number 108, and spawned two radio hits: "Hands All Over" and "Loud Love".

Soundgarden's third album, Badmotorfinger (1991), helped usher in the mainstream success of grunge. The album was buoyed by the success of the singles "Jesus Christ Pose", "Outshined" and "Rusty Cage", reached number 39 on the Billboard 200 and has been certified double-platinum by the Recording Industry Association of America (RIAA). The band's fourth album, Superunknown (1994), expanded their popularity; it debuted at number one on the Billboard 200 and yielded the Grammy Award-winning singles "Spoonman" and "Black Hole Sun". Soundgarden experimented with new sonic textures on their follow-up album Down on the Upside (1996), which debuted at number two on the Billboard 200 and spawned several hit singles of its own, including "Pretty Noose", "Burden in My Hand" and "Blow Up the Outside World". In 1997, the band broke up due to internal strife over its creative direction and exhaustion from touring. After more than a decade of working on projects and other bands, they reunited in 2010. Republic Records released the band's sixth and final studio album, King Animal, in 2012, the last album to be released in Cornell's lifetime.

Cornell died by suicide in 2017, resulting in the band's second breakup. They continued to occasionally reunite: first for a one-off tribute concert to Cornell in January 2019, second in December 2024 under the anagram Nudedragons for a Seattle benefit concert, and third in November 2025 for Soundgarden's induction into the Rock and Roll Hall of Fame, joined by founding bassist Hiro Yamamoto for the first time in 36 years, and by Taylor Momsen and Brandi Carlile, both on vocals. Despite being officially defunct as a band, the surviving members have been working on Soundgarden's planned seventh and final studio album using unfinished tracks that were recorded by Cornell prior to his death. The band performed at the halftime show for a Seattle Seahawks game on September 9, 2026. The band was joined by Momsen on vocals and Pearl Jam's Mike McCready on guitar, and played "Outshined" and "Spoonman".

By 2019, Soundgarden had sold more than 14 million records in the United States, and an estimated 30 million worldwide. VH1 ranked them at number 14 in their special, 100 Greatest Artists of Hard Rock list. The band was inducted into the Rock and Roll Hall of Fame in 2025.

== History ==
=== Formation and early recordings (1984–1988) ===
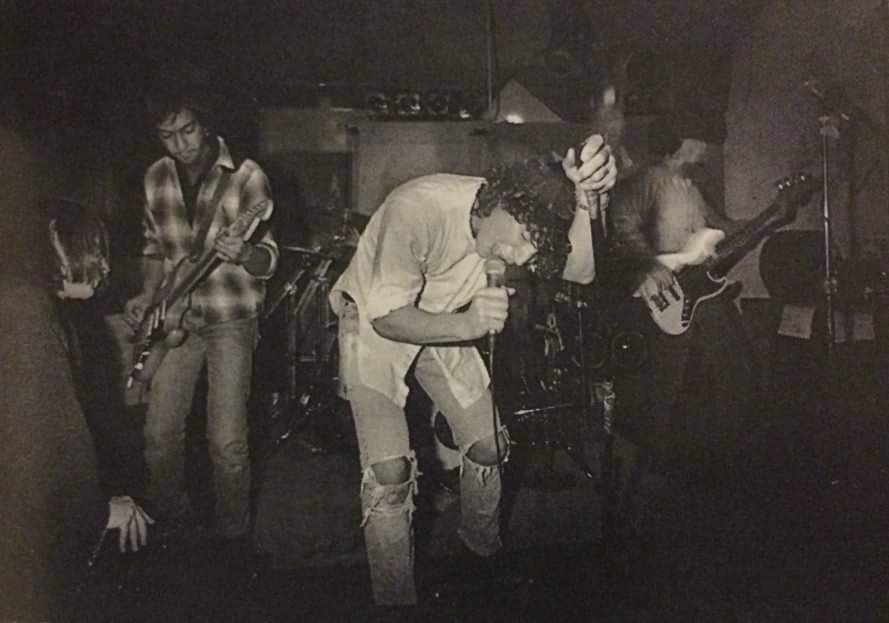
Soundgarden in 1985

Soundgarden was formed in 1984 and included drummer Chris Cornell and vocals and bassist Hiro Yamamoto. Cornell and Yamamoto had been jamming together, and after trying several guitarists, were joined by Kim Thayil. The band named themselves after a wind-channeling pipe sculpture titled A Sound Garden, on National Oceanic and Atmospheric Administration property at 7600 Sand Point Way, next to Magnuson Park in Seattle.

Though both were born in Seattle, Thayil and Yamamoto grew up in Park Forest, Illinois. They moved back to Seattle with Bruce Pavitt, who later started the independent record label Sub Pop. Cornell was a Seattle native.

Soundgarden's origin has been attributed to a band called the Shemps, which had performed around Seattle in the early 1980s. However, the three never performed together in that band, and Thayil has explicitly stated "none of us formed a band together based on our Shemps experience."

Cornell originally played drums while singing, but in 1985 the band enlisted Scott Sundquist to allow Cornell to concentrate on vocals. The band traveled around playing various concerts with this lineup for about a year. Their first recordings were three songs that appeared on the 1986 compilation album for C/Z Records called Deep Six: "Heretic", "Tears to Forget" and "All Your Lies". It also featured songs by fellow grunge pioneers Green River, Skin Yard, Malfunkshun, the U-Men, and the Melvins. In 1986, Cornell's then-girlfriend and future wife, Susan Silver started managing Soundgarden. In the same year, Sundquist left the band to spend time with his family and was replaced by former Skin Yard drummer Matt Cameron.

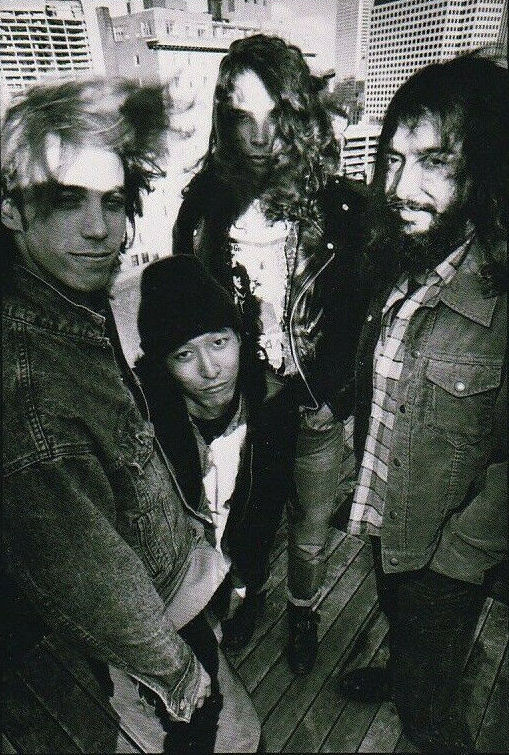
Soundgarden in 1987

A Soundgarden performance one night impressed KCMU DJ Jonathan Poneman, who later said: "I saw this band that was everything rock music should be." Poneman offered to fund a release by the band, so Thayil suggested he team up with Bruce Pavitt. Poneman offered to contribute $20,000 in funding for Sub Pop, effectively turning it into a full-fledged record label. Soundgarden signed to Sub Pop, and the label released "Hunted Down" in 1987 as the band's first single. The B-side of "Hunted Down", "Nothing to Say", appeared on the KCMU compilation tape Bands That Will Make Money, which was distributed to record companies, many of whom showed interest in Soundgarden. Through Sub Pop, the band released the Screaming Life EP in 1987, and the Fopp EP in 1988, and a combination of the two, Screaming Life/Fopp, in 1990.

=== Ultramega OK, major label signing, and Louder Than Love (1988–1990) ===
Though major labels were courting the band, in 1988 they signed to the independent label SST Records for their debut album, Ultramega OK, released on October 31, 1988. Cornell said the band "made a huge mistake with Ultramega OK" because they used a producer suggested by SST who "didn't know what was happening in Seattle." According to Steve Huey of AllMusic, Soundgarden demonstrates a "Stooges/MC5-meets-Zeppelin/Sabbath sound" on the album. Mark Miremont directed the band's first music video for "Flower", which aired regularly on MTV's 120 Minutes. Soundgarden promoted Ultramega OK on a tour in the United States in the spring of 1989, and a tour in Europe which began in May of that year—the band's first overseas tour. Ultramega OK earned the band a Grammy Award nomination for Best Metal Performance in 1990.

The band signed with A&M Records in mid-1988, which had caused a rift between Soundgarden and its traditional audience. Thayil said, "In the beginning, our fans came from the punk rock crowd. They abandoned us when they thought we sold out the punk tenets, getting on a major label and touring with Guns N' Roses. There were fashion issues and social issues, and people thought we no longer belonged to their scene, to their particular sub-culture." The band began work on its first album for a major label, but personnel difficulties caused a shift in the band's songwriting process. According to Cornell, "At the time Hiro [Yamamoto] excommunicated himself from the band and there wasn't a free-flowing system as far as music went, so I ended up writing a lot of it." On September 5, 1989, the band released its debut major-label album, Louder Than Love, which saw it take "a step toward the metal mainstream", according to Steve Huey of AllMusic, describing it as "a slow, grinding, detuned mountain of Sabbath/Zeppelin riffs and Chris Cornell wailing". Because of some of the lyrics, most notably on "Hands All Over" and "Big Dumb Sex", the band faced various retail and distribution problems upon the album's release. Louder Than Love became Soundgarden's first album to chart on the Billboard 200, peaking at number 108, and it was also the first grunge album to enter that chart. This accomplishment was aided by two singles — "Hands All Over" and "Loud Love" — that gained the band exposure on MTV's Headbangers Ball, and mainstream rock radio stations outside of Seattle such as KNAC, WMMS, KRZQ, WBCN, Z Rock and KISS-FM.

A month before touring for Louder Than Love was to begin, Yamamoto, who was becoming frustrated that he was not making much of a contribution, left the band to return to college. First the band played a few rehearsals with Jim Tillman from the U-Men, but it did not work out, and soon Jason Everman, formerly of Nirvana, officially replaced Yamamoto on bass. The band toured North America from December 1989 to March 1990, opening for Voivod, who were supporting their album Nothingface, with Faith No More and the Big F also as opening acts at the beginning and end of the tour. The band also toured Europe. The band fired Everman in mid-1990 after completing its promotional tour for Louder Than Love; Thayil said that "Jason just didn't work out." Louder Than Love spawned the EP Loudest Love and the video compilation Louder Than Live, both released in 1990.

=== Established lineup, Badmotorfinger, and rise in popularity (1990–1993) ===
Bassist Ben Shepherd replaced Everman in 1990 and the new lineup recorded Soundgarden's third album the following year. Cornell said that Shepherd brought a "fresh and creative" approach to the recording sessions, and the band as a whole said that his knowledge of music and writing skills redefined the band. The band released the resulting album, Badmotorfinger, on October 8, 1991. Steve Huey of AllMusic said that the songwriting on Badmotorfinger "takes a quantum leap in focus and consistency." He added, "It's surprisingly cerebral and arty music for a band courting mainstream metal audiences." Thayil suggested that the album's lyrics are "like reading a novel [about] man's conflict with himself and society, or the government, or his family, or the economy, or anything." The first single from Badmotorfinger, "Jesus Christ Pose", garnered attention when MTV decided to ban its music video in 1991. The song and its video outraged many listeners who perceived it as anti-Christian. The band received death threats while on tour in the United Kingdom in support of the album. Cornell explained that the lyrics criticize public figures who use religion (particularly the image of Jesus Christ) to portray themselves as being persecuted. Although eclipsed at the time of its release by the sudden popularity of Nirvana's Nevermind, the focus of attention brought by Nevermind to the Seattle scene helped Soundgarden gain wider attention. The album's follow-up singles, "Outshined" and "Rusty Cage", found an audience on alternative rock radio and MTV. Badmotorfinger was nominated for a Grammy Award for Best Metal Performance in 1992, and was among the 100 top-selling albums of the year.

Following the release of Badmotorfinger, Soundgarden toured North American in October and November 1991. Afterward, Guns N' Roses selected the band as its opening act for their Use Your Illusion tour. The band also opened for Skid Row in North America in February 1992 on their Slave to the Grind tour, and then headed to Europe for a month-long headlining theater tour. The band returned for a tour in the United States, and then rejoined Guns N' Roses in the summer of 1992 in Europe as part of the Use Your Illusion tour along with fellow opening act Faith No More. Describing opening for Guns N' Roses, Cornell said, "It wasn't a whole lot of fun going out in front of 40,000 people for 35 minutes every day. Most of them never heard our songs and didn't care about them. It was a bizarre thing." The band played the 1992 Lollapalooza tour with the Red Hot Chili Peppers, Pearl Jam, Ministry and Ice Cube among others. In anticipation of the band's appearance at Lollapalooza, they released a limited edition of Badmotorfinger in 1992 with a second disc containing the EP Satanoscillatemymetallicsonatas (a palindrome), featuring Soundgarden's cover of Black Sabbath's "Into the Void", titled "Into the Void (Sealth)", which was nominated for a Grammy Award for Best Metal Performance in 1993. The band released the video compilation Motorvision, filmed at Seattle's Paramount Theatre in 1992. The band appeared in the movie Singles, performing "Birth Ritual". The song is included on the soundtrack, as is a Cornell solo song, "Seasons".

In 1993, the band contributed the track "Show Me" to the AIDS-Benefit album No Alternative, produced by the Red Hot Organization.

=== Superunknown and mainstream success (1994–1995) ===
Soundgarden began working on its fourth album after touring in support of Badmotorfinger. Cornell said that while working on the album, the band allowed each other more freedom than on past records, and Thayil observed that they had spent a lot more time working on the recording of the songs than on previous records. Released on March 8, 1994, Superunknown became the band's breakthrough album, debuting at number one on the Billboard 200 album chart and being driven by the singles "Spoonman", "The Day I Tried to Live", "Black Hole Sun", "My Wave", and "Fell on Black Days".

The songs on Superunknown captured the creativity and heaviness of the band's earlier works, while showcasing the group's newly evolving style. Lyrically, the album was quite dark and mysterious, and it is often interpreted to be dealing with substance abuse, suicide, and depression. At the time, Sylvia Plath inspired Cornell's writing. The album was also more experimental than previous releases, with some songs incorporating Middle-Eastern or Indian music. J. D. Considine of Rolling Stone said Superunknown "demonstrates far greater range than many bands manage in an entire career". He also stated, "At its best, Superunknown offers a more harrowing depiction of alienation and despair than anything on [Nirvana's final studio album] In Utero." The music video for "Black Hole Sun" became a hit on MTV, and received the award for Best Metal/Hard Rock Video at the 1994 MTV Video Music Awards, and in 1995 the Clio Award for Alternative Music Video. Soundgarden won two Grammy Awards in 1995—"Black Hole Sun" received the award for Best Hard Rock Performance and "Spoonman" received the award for Best Metal Performance. The album was nominated for a Grammy Award for Best Rock Album in 1995. Superunknown has been certified six times Platinum in the United States and remains Soundgarden's most successful album.

The band began touring in January 1994 in Oceania and Japan, areas where the record came out early and where the band had never toured before. This round of touring ended in February 1994. In the following month, the band moved on to Europe. They began a theater and arena tour of the United States, first with a stop on May 27, 1994, at the PNE Forum in Vancouver, with the opening acts Tad and Eleven. In late 1994, after touring in support of Superunknown, doctors discovered that Cornell had severely strained his vocal cords, and Soundgarden canceled several shows to avoid causing any permanent damage. Cornell said, "I think we kinda overdid it! We were playing five or six nights a week and my voice pretty much took a beating. Towards the end of the American tour I felt like I could still kinda sing, but I wasn't really giving the band a fair shake. You don't buy a ticket to see some guy croak for two hours! That seemed like kind of a rip off." The band made up the dates later in 1995. Superunknown spawned the EP Songs from the Superunknown and the CD-ROM Alive in the Superunknown, both released in 1995.

=== Down on the Upside and breakup (1996–1997) ===
Following the worldwide tour in support of Superunknown, the band began working on what would become their last studio album for over 15 years, choosing to produce it themselves. However, tensions within the group reportedly arose during the sessions, with Thayil and Cornell allegedly clashing over Cornell's desire to shift away from the heavy guitar riffing that had become the band's trademark. Cornell said, "By the time we were finished, it felt like it had been kind of hard, like it was a long, hard haul. But there was stuff we were discovering." The band's fifth album, Down on the Upside, was released on May 21, 1996. It was notably less heavy than the group's earlier albums, and marked a further departure from the band's grunge roots. At the time, Soundgarden explained that they wanted to experiment with other sounds, including acoustic instrumentation. David Browne of Entertainment Weekly said, "Few bands since Led Zeppelin have so crisply mixed instruments both acoustic and electric." The overall mood of the album's lyrics is less dark than on previous Soundgarden albums, with Cornell describing some songs as "self-affirming". The album spawned several singles, including "Pretty Noose", "Burden in My Hand", and "Blow Up the Outside World". "Pretty Noose" was nominated for a Grammy Award for Best Hard Rock Performance in 1997. The album did not match the sales or critical praise of Superunknown.

The band took a slot on the 1996 Lollapalooza tour with Metallica, who had insisted on Soundgarden's appearance on the tour. After Lollapalooza, the band embarked on a world tour, and already-existing tensions increased during it. When asked whether the band hated touring, Cornell replied: "We really enjoy it to a point, and then it gets tedious, because it becomes repetitious. You feel like fans have paid their money and they expect you to come out and play them your songs like the first time you ever played them. That's the point where we hate touring." At the tour's last stop in Honolulu, Hawaii on February 9, 1997, Shepherd threw his bass into the air in frustration after suffering equipment failure, and then stormed off the stage. The band retreated, with Cornell returning to end the show with a solo encore. On April 9, 1997, the band announced they were disbanding. Thayil said, "It was pretty obvious from everybody's general attitude over the course of the previous half year that there was some dissatisfaction." Cameron later said that Soundgarden was "eaten up by the business". The band released a greatest hits collection entitled A-Sides on November 4, 1997, composed of 17 songs, including the previously unreleased "Bleed Together", which was recorded during the Down on the Upside recording sessions.

=== Post-breakup activities (1998–2009) ===
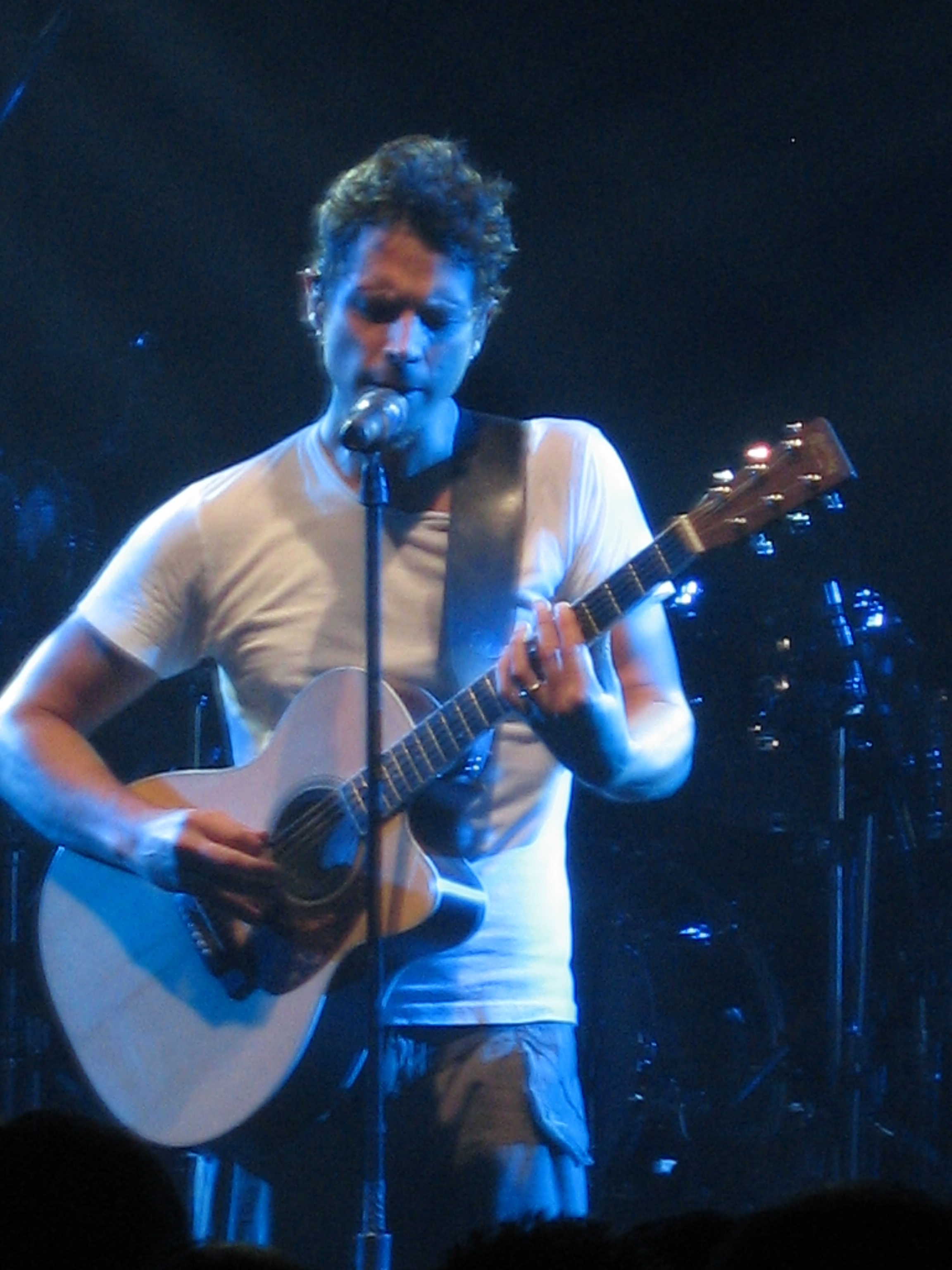
Frontman Chris Cornell performing live at the Montreux Jazz Festival in 2005

Cornell released his first solo album in September 1999, entitled Euphoria Morning, which featured Matt Cameron on the track "Disappearing One". By May 2001, Cornell had joined the platinum-selling supergroup Audioslave with Tom Morello, Tim Commerford and Brad Wilk, then-former members of Rage Against the Machine, which recorded three albums: Audioslave (2002), Out of Exile (2005), and Revelations (2006). Cornell left Audioslave in early 2007, resulting in the band's break-up. His second solo album, Carry On, was released in June 2007, and his third solo album, Scream, produced by Timbaland, was released in March 2009, both to mixed commercial and critical success. Cornell also wrote the lyrics and provided vocals for the song "Promise" on Slash's debut solo album Slash, released in 2010.

Thayil joined forces with former Dead Kennedys singer Jello Biafra, former Nirvana bassist Krist Novoselic, and drummer Gina Mainwal for one show, performing as The No WTO Combo during the WTO ministerial conference in Seattle on December 1, 1999. Thayil contributed guitar tracks to Steve Fisk's 2001 album, 999 Levels of Undo, as well as Dave Grohl's 2004 one-off album, Probot. In 2006, Thayil played guitar on the album Altar, the collaboration between the bands Sunn O))) and Boris.

Cameron initially turned his efforts to his side-project Wellwater Conspiracy, to which both Shepherd and Thayil had contributed. He then worked briefly with the Smashing Pumpkins on the band's 1998 album, Adore. That same year, he played drums for Pearl Jam's Yield Tour following Jack Irons' departure, and later became an official member of the band, remaining until his departure in July 2025. He recorded seven albums with Pearl Jam: Binaural (2000), Riot Act (2002), Pearl Jam (2006), Backspacer (2009), Lightning Bolt (2013), Gigaton (2020) and Dark Matter (2024). Cameron also played percussion on Geddy Lee's album My Favourite Headache. In 2017, he was inducted into the Rock and Roll Hall of Fame as a member of Pearl Jam.

Shepherd was the singer on Wellwater Conspiracy's 1997 debut studio album, Declaration of Conformity, but left the band after its release. He has toured with Mark Lanegan and played bass on two of Lanegan's albums, I'll Take Care of You (1999), and Field Songs (2001). Shepherd and Cameron lent a hand with recording Tony Iommi's album IOMMI (2000). While they were members of Soundgarden they were part of the side-project band Hater, and in 2005 Shepherd released the band's long-delayed second album, The 2nd.

In a July 2009 interview with Rolling Stone, Cornell shot down rumors of a reunion, saying that conversations between the band members had been limited to discussion about the release of a box set or B-sides album of Soundgarden rarities, and that there had been no discussion of a reunion at all. The band's interest in new releases emerged from a 2008 meeting about their shared properties, both financial and legal, where they realized Soundgarden lacked online presence such as a website or a Facebook page. As Thayil summed up, "We kind of had neglected our merchandise over the last decade". Eventually the musicians decided to create an official site handled by Pearl Jam's Ten Club, relaunch their catalog, and according to Cameron, seek "a bunch of unreleased stuff we wanted to try to put out". In March 2009, Thayil, Shepherd and Cameron got onstage during a concert by Tad Doyle in Seattle and played some Soundgarden songs. Cornell stated that the moment "sort of sparked the idea: If Matt, Kim, and Ben can get in a room, rehearse a couple songs, and play, maybe we all could do that as Soundgarden."

On October 6, 2009, all the members of Soundgarden attended Night 3 of Pearl Jam's four-night stand at the Gibson Amphitheatre in Universal City, California. During an encore, Temple of the Dog reunited for the first time since Pearl Jam's show at the Santa Barbara Bowl on October 28, 2003. Chris Cornell joined the band to sing "Hunger Strike". It was the first public appearance of Soundgarden since their breakup in April 1997. Consequently, rumors of an impending reunion were circulating on the Internet.

=== Reunion, Telephantasm and King Animal (2010–2013) ===
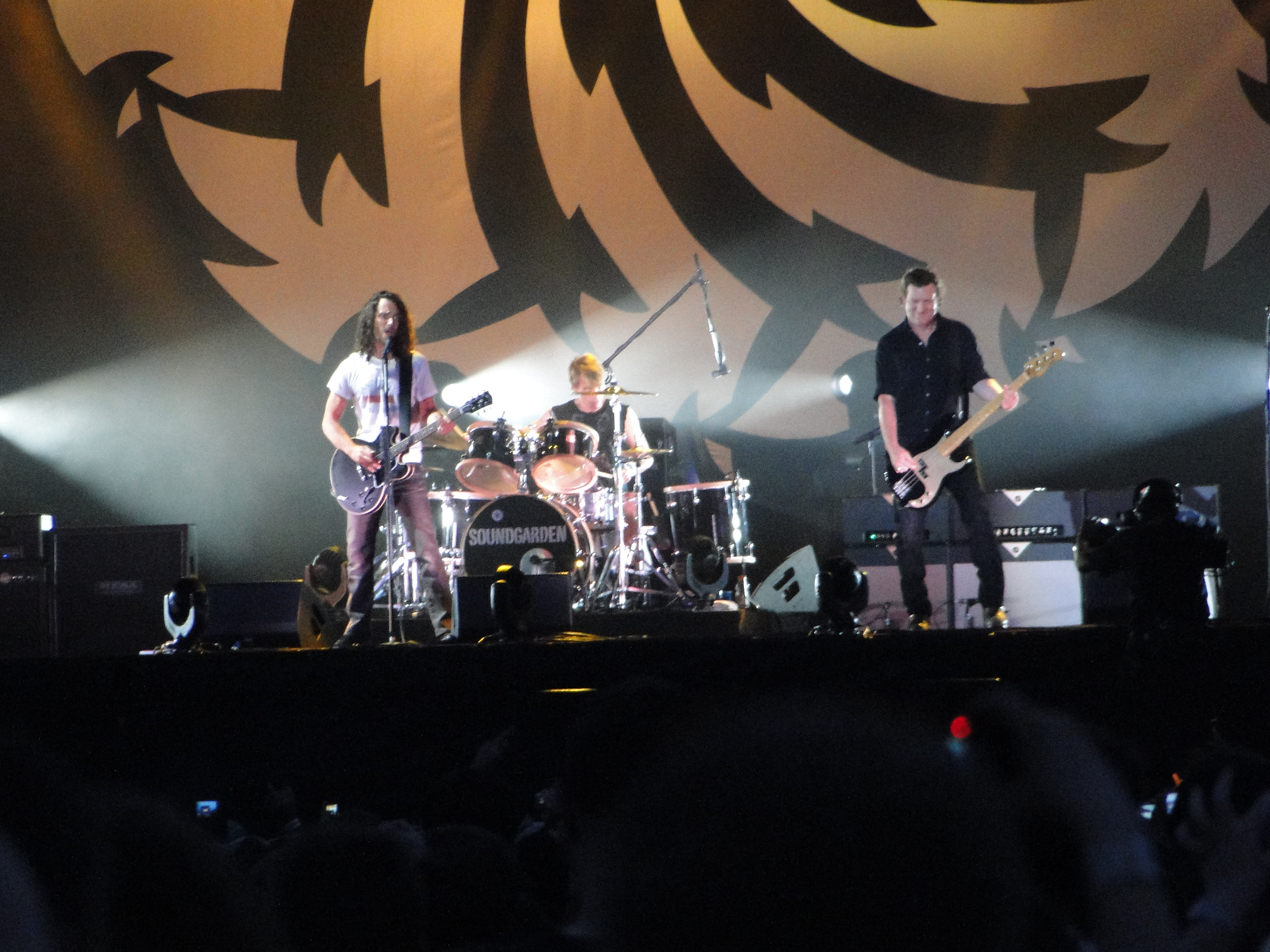
Soundgarden performed at Lollapalooza in 2010. (L-R: Cornell, Cameron, and Shepherd. Not pictured: Thayil.)

On January 1, 2010, Cornell alluded to a Soundgarden reunion on his Twitter account writing: "The 12-year break is over and school is back in session. Sign up now. Knights of the Soundtable ride again!" The message linked to a website that featured a picture of the group performing live and a place for fans to enter their e-mail addresses to get updates on the reunion. Entering that information unlocked a video for the song "Get on the Snake", from 1989's Louder Than Love. On March 1, 2010, Soundgarden announced to their e-mail subscribers that they would be re-releasing an old single "Hunted Down" with the song "Nothing to Say" on a 7-inch vinyl record. It was released on April 17, coinciding with Record Store Day. They released "Spoonman" live at the Del Mar Fairgrounds in San Diego, California from 1996. Soundgarden played their first show since 1997 on April 16 at the Showbox at the Market in the band's hometown of Seattle. The band headlined Lollapalooza on August 8.

Telephantasm: A Retrospective, a new Soundgarden compilation album, was packaged with initial shipments of the Guitar Hero: Warriors of Rock video game and released on September 28, 2010, one week before the CD's availability in stores on October 5, 2010. An expanded version of Telephantasm consisting of two CDs and one DVD is available for sale. A previously unreleased Soundgarden song—"Black Rain"—debuted on the Guitar Hero video game and appears on the compilation album, which achieved platinum certification status after its first day of retail availability. "Black Rain" hit rock radio stations on August 10, 2010, and was the band's first single since 1997. In November 2010, Soundgarden was the second musical guest on the show Conan, making their first television appearance in 13 years. The band issued a 7-inch vinyl, "The Telephantasm", for Black Friday Record Store Day. In March 2011, Soundgarden released their first live album, Live on I-5.

In February 2011, Soundgarden announced on their homepage that they had started recording a new album. On March 1, 2011, Chris Cornell confirmed that Adam Kasper would produce it. Four days later, the band stated it would consist of material that was "90 percent new" with the rest consisting of updated versions of older ideas. They also noted that they had 12 to 14 songs that were "kind of ready to go". Although Cameron claimed the album would be released in 2011, the recording was prolonged as Thayil said that "the more we enjoy it, the more our fans should end up enjoying it". Thayil also reported that some songs sound "similar in a sense to Down on the Upside" and that the album would be "picking up where we left off. There are some heavy moments, and there are some fast songs." The next day, Cornell reported that the new album would not be released until the spring of 2012.

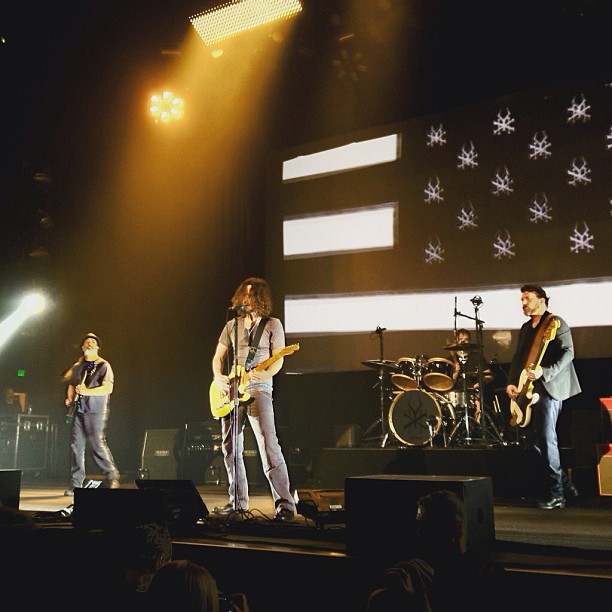
Soundgarden performing in 2013

In April 2011, Soundgarden announced a summer tour consisting of 16 dates across the US with various opening acts. The band later headlined Voodoo Experience at City Park in New Orleans on the 2011 Halloween weekend. In March 2012 a post on the band's official Facebook page said a new song, "Live to Rise", would be included on the soundtrack of the upcoming movie The Avengers, based on the Marvel Comics franchise. It was the first newly recorded song the band had released since re-forming in 2010. "Live to Rise" was released as a free download on iTunes on April 17. Also in March it was announced that Soundgarden would headline the Friday night of the Hard Rock Calling Festival the following July in London, England. In April, Soundgarden announced the release of a box set titled Classic Album Selection for Europe, containing all of their studio albums except for Ultramega OK, and live album Live on I-5. On May 5, just before The Offspring began playing their set, the band appeared as a special guest at the 20th annual KROQ Weenie Roast in Irvine, California. Later that month, Soundgarden told Rolling Stone they were eyeing an October release for their new album. That June, the band appeared at Download Festival in Donington, England. The band released "Been Away Too Long", the first single from their new album King Animal on September 27; the album was released on November 13, 2012. The band released a video for "By Crooked Steps", directed by Dave Grohl, in early 2013. "Halfway There" was the third and final single released from the album.

=== Echo of Miles... and Cornell's death (2013–2017) ===
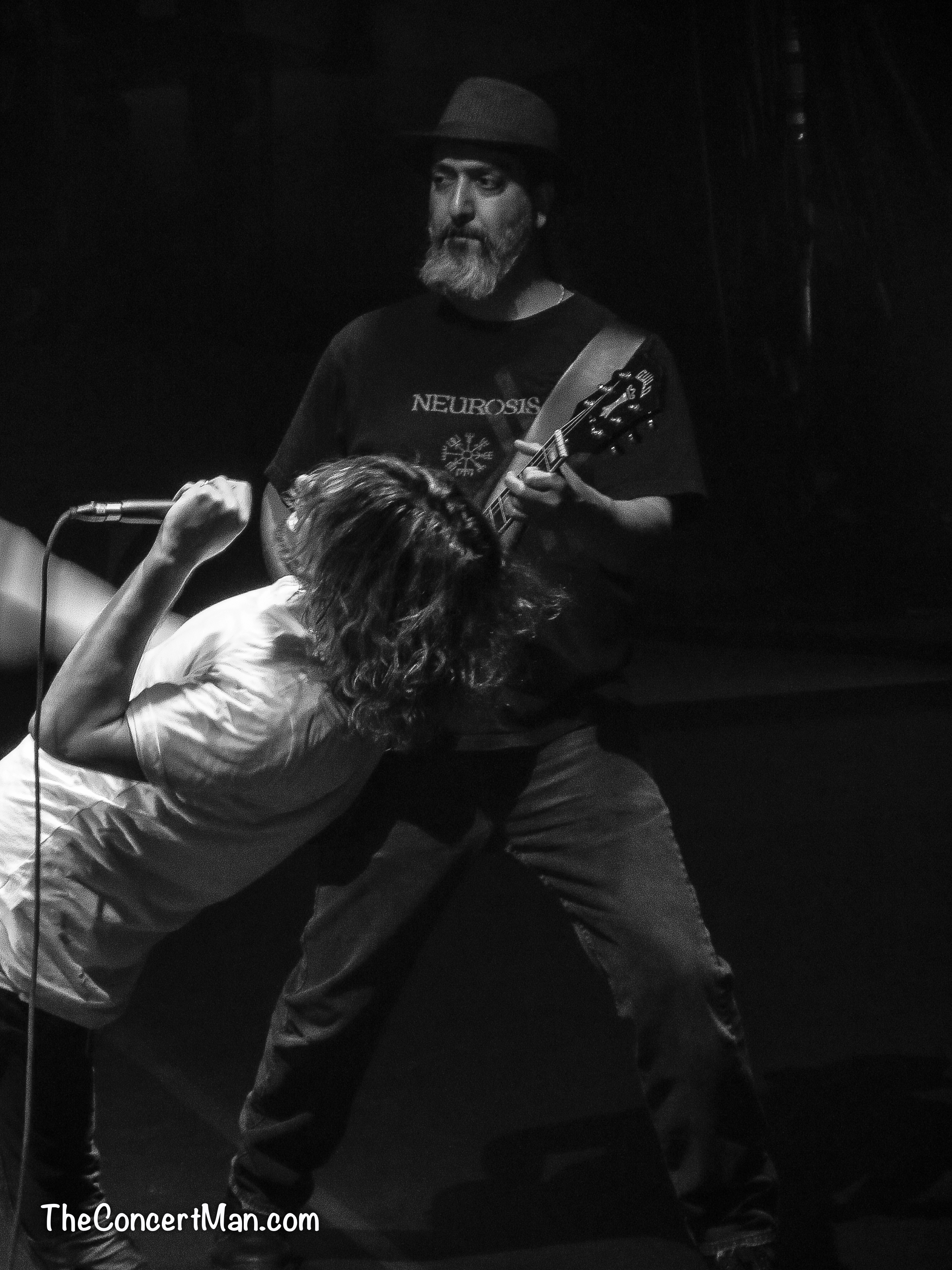
Chris Cornell and Kim Thayil (2012)

On November 15, 2013, drummer Matt Cameron announced he would not be touring with Soundgarden in 2014, due to prior commitments promoting Pearl Jam's album Lightning Bolt. On March 16, 2014, Soundgarden and Nine Inch Nails announced they were going to tour North America together, along with opening act Death Grips. Former Pearl Jam drummer Matt Chamberlain filled in for Cameron for live shows in South America and Europe on March 27, 2014.

Soundgarden announced on October 28, 2014, they would release the 3-CD compilation box set, Echo of Miles: Scattered Tracks Across the Path, on November 24. The set includes rarities, live tracks, and unreleased material spanning the group's history. It includes previously released songs, such as "Live to Rise", "Black Rain", "Birth Ritual", and others, as well as a newly recorded rendition of the song "The Storm" from the band's pre-Matt Cameron 1985 demo, now simply titled "Storm", which was, like the original, produced by Jack Endino. One day before its official announcement, on October 27, the band posted a copy of "Storm" on YouTube.

Thayil mentioned in several interviews it was likely the band would start working on material for a new album in 2015, and in August 2015, Cornell stated they were doing so. On January 19, 2016, The Pulse Of Radio announced that Soundgarden had returned to the studio to continue working on their new album. On July 14, 2016, bassist Ben Shepherd and Cameron stated that the band had written "six solid tunes" for the new album, with more writing to be done in August.

On May 18, 2017, Cornell was found dead, "with a band around his neck", according to his representative, Brian Bumbery. Cornell was in his room at the MGM Grand hotel and casino in Detroit, Michigan, after performing at the Fox Theatre with Soundgarden. From the outset, the investigation into the singer's death was described by a local police spokesperson as that of a "possible suicide", based on unspecified details in the room where his body was discovered. Subsequently, the Wayne County Medical Examiner's Office determined the cause of death as suicide by hanging. However, Cornell's widow, Vicky, questioned whether he would deliberately end his own life, and said that the drug Ativan, which her husband was taking, might have led him to commit suicide. She said: "I know that he loved our children and he would not hurt them by intentionally taking his own life."

Following Cornell's death, Soundgarden canceled the rest of their 2017 tour, including headlining performances at Rock on the Range and Rocklahoma later that month.

=== Second disbandment, reunions and upcoming final album (2017–present) ===
In September 2017, drummer Matt Cameron told Billboard that he and the other surviving members of Soundgarden had yet to make a decision about the future of the band following Cornell's death. He was quoted as saying, "I don't think we're ready to say anything other than ... Kim and Ben and I are certainly aware of how much our fans are hurting, and we're certainly hurting right there along with them. But we're extremely private people, and we're all still processing our grief in our own way and on our own time. But we definitely are thinking of our fans and love them very much."

In September 2018, guitarist Kim Thayil told Billboard that he and the other surviving members of Soundgarden were still unsure about the future of the band. He clarified, "We often reference rock history and we've often commented on what other bands in similar situations have done, not as a plan or anything but just commenting on how bands have handled situations like this and what bands seem to have been graceful and dignified in how they manage their future musical endeavors and how some maybe were clumsy and callous. We think about those things. We try not to go too deep into these conversations, but stuff comes up after a few beers." A month later, Cameron told Rolling Stone that the surviving members of Soundgarden "would certainly love to try to continue to do something, figure out something to do together." Bassist Ben Shepherd added, "We haven't even gotten a chance to hang out, just us three, yet. We're going through natural healing, then thinking about the natural next step."

In an October 2018 interview with Seattle Times, Thayil stated that the Soundgarden band name would be retired. He explained, "I don't know really what kind of thing is possible or what we would consider in the future. It's likely nothing. The four of us were that. There were four of us and now there's three of us, so it's just not likely that there's much to be pursued other than the catalog work at this point." Thayil also stated that while he did not rule out the possibility of working with Cameron and Shepherd in a different capacity, writing or touring under the Soundgarden banner again was unlikely: "No, I don't think that's anything we'd give reasonable consideration to at this point. When I say 'at this point,' I mean perhaps ever."

In January 2019, the remaining members of the band reunited in a tribute concert and fundraiser at the Forum in Inglewood, California, organized by Cornell's widow, Vicky Cornell. Members of Soundgarden, Temple of the Dog, Audioslave, Alice in Chains, the Melvins, Foo Fighters, and Metallica together with other notable artists performed songs from Cornell's career. Taylor Momsen, Marcus Durant, Brandi Carlile, and Taylor Hawkins contributed vocals to Soundgarden, who performed "Rusty Cage", "Flower", "Outshined", "Drawing Flies", "Loud Love", "I Awake", "The Day I Tried to Live", and "Black Hole Sun", making this their first performance since Cornell's death.

In July 2019, Thayil said in an interview with Music Radar that the surviving members of Soundgarden are trying to finish and release the album they were working on with Cornell. However, the master files of Cornell's vocal recordings are currently being withheld, and when Thayil sought permission to use these files, he was denied.

In December 2019, Cornell's widow, Vicky Cornell, sued the surviving members of Soundgarden over seven unreleased recordings Cornell made before his death in 2017, claiming "they have "shamelessly conspired to wrongfully withhold hundreds of thousands of dollars indisputably owed to Chris' widow and minor children in an unlawful attempt to strong-arm Chris' Estate into turning over certain audio recordings created by Chris before he passed away." The lawsuit stated that Cornell made the seven recordings at his personal studio in Florida in 2017, which there was never any explicit agreement that these songs were meant for Soundgarden, and that Cornell was the only owner of tracks. In February 2020, Thayil, Cameron and Shepherd demanded Vicky to hand over the unreleased recordings, claiming that they worked jointly on these final tracks with Chris and that Vicky had no right to withhold from them what they call the "final Soundgarden album." The band members pointed to interviews Chris and his bandmates made at the time confirming they were working together on what would be Soundgarden's eighth album. In March 2020, Soundgarden asked court to dismiss the lawsuit. In May 2020, Soundgarden countersued Vicky claiming that she engaged in "fraudulent inducement" by allegedly attempting to use the revenue from the January 2019 "I Am the Highway: A Tribute to Chris Cornell" concert, which was meant to go to the Chris and Vicky Cornell Foundation, for "personal purposes for herself and her family". The band dropped the benefit concert lawsuit in July 2020.

On August 10, 2020, Nile Rodgers and Merck Mercuriadis' company Hipgnosis Songs Fund acquired 100% of Chris Cornell's catalog of song rights (241 songs), including Soundgarden's catalog. Rodgers is friends with Cornell's widow.

On December 1, 2020, Thayil, Shepherd and Cameron performed as "members of Soundgarden" alongside Tad Doyle of Tad, Mike McCready and Meagan Grandallat at MoPOP Founders Award tribute to Alice in Chains.

In February 2021, Vicky Cornell filed another lawsuit claiming that the remaining members of Soundgarden had undervalued her share of the band, offering her "the villainously low figure of less than $300,000." Vicky claimed the band offered her $300,000 despite receiving a $16 million offer from another investor for the act's master recordings. Vicky said she counter-offered $12 million for the band's collective interests, equaling $4 million per surviving member, which they denied. She then offered them $21 million for the band's interests, and that offer was also rejected. Soundgarden said in a statement that the "buyout offer that was demanded by the estate has been grossly mischaracterized and we are confident that clarity will come out in court. All offers to buy out our interests have been unsolicited and rejected outright." The band also noted that they also had not had access to their social media accounts, which has resulted in "misleading and confusing our fans", leading the band to create new Twitter, Instagram and Facebook accounts under the name "Nude Dragons", an anagram for Soundgarden. On March 19, 2021, a federal judge recommended that claims the surviving band members improperly withheld "hundreds of thousands of dollars" and that the band's manager breached his duty to look after Vicky's interests be dismissed, citing lack of evidence of the band withholding royalties. On March 25, 2021, Soundgarden demanded the passwords for their social media and website. On June 15, 2021, the band got their website and social media accounts back in a temporary agreement with Vicky.

On April 17, 2023, it was officially revealed that seven final recordings with Cornell would be released after the dispute between the members and Vicky Cornell had ended. In a September 2025 interview with Billboard, Cameron confirmed that he, Thayil and Shepherd were "definitely over halfway done with" the remaining eight songs the band worked on before Cornell's death. It was announced in November 2025 that during the album's sessions, the band reunited with producer Terry Date. Thayil reiterated the album's progress in June 2026: "We're kind of fitting it in with the schedules of the individuals, the producers, engineers, Matt, Ben and myself." A month later, Thayil announced that the band is aiming to release the album in 2027, in honor of the tenth anniversary of Cornell's death.

On December 14, 2024, the surviving members of Soundgarden, along with vocalist Shaina Shepherd, performed together under the moniker Nudedragons (previously used in 2010) for a benefit show in Seattle for the Seattle Children's Hospital. The surviving members of the band were scheduled to perform the following July for the benefit concert Back to the Beginning, but did not appear due to scheduling conflicts.

On November 8, 2025, Soundgarden was inducted into the Rock and Roll Hall of Fame by Jim Carrey. At the ceremony, the surviving members of the band were joined by original bassist Hiro Yamamoto for the first time in 36 years and performed a two-song set: Momsen and Mike McCready joined them for "Rusty Cage", while Carlile and Jerry Cantrell were the additional performers for "Black Hole Sun". Cornell's daughter Toni also performed at the ceremony, singing the band's "Fell on Black Days".

Soundgarden performed at the 2026 opening NFL game in Seattle on September 9. Momsen and McCready once again joined the band for the show. It was the second time that the band played at the NFL season opener in Seattle. The first being in 2014, after the Seahawks won their first Super Bowl against the Denver Broncos. On October 3, during the Power to the People Festival, a beneficent event for voter awareness organized by Tom Morello at Merriweather Post Pavilion in Columbia, MD, Cameron, McCready and Momsen had a set as "Suns of Soundgarden" alongside Morello and bassist Robbie Mangano, performing “Loud Love,” “Outshined,” and “Spoonman.”

== Musical style and influences ==
Soundgarden were pioneers of the grunge music genre, which mixed elements of punk rock and metal to make a sludgy, murky sound through the use of fuzzy-sounding distortion in the guitars.

Soundgarden cited Minutemen, the Meat Puppets, Butthole Surfers, Wire, and Joy Division as key early influences. Kim Thayil and Hiro Yamamoto also cited Siouxsie and the Banshees first in interviews. Black Sabbath also had a significant impact on the band's sound, especially on the guitar riffs and tunings. Guitarist Kim Thayil has described the band's sound as a "Sabbath-influenced punk".

Soundgarden has been frequently compared to Led Zeppelin, their early sound being described as consisting of "gnarled neo-Zeppelinisms". In 1990, Joe Gore of Guitar Player wrote, "Like L.A.'s Jane's Addiction (and unlike, say, Kingdom Come), Soundgarden leaves fresh footprints on the well-trodden Zeppelin path, thanks largely to the psychedelic blues-metal guitar work of Kim Thayil." In 2004, Guitar World wrote that, "If Chris Cornell was the Robert Plant of the Seattle scene, then Thayil was its Tony Iommi." Though the band had initially denied being inspired by Led Zeppelin, they would eventually embrace this influence, as detailed by Thayil:

[W]e started getting [comparisons to Led Zeppelin] a lot: 'Zeppelin, Zeppelin, Zeppelin,' and we were like, OK, let's check some of this out. We were all very acquainted with it individually, but collectively we weren't sitting around the table listening them. So initially we would deny that influence. Eventually, after practice we'd be like, 'Let's check out Led Zeppelin IV.' Let's listen to Houses of the Holy.' Like, 'Yeah, I guess I can kind of see that a little bit.' It became very important to us, because of the comparison, so we would listen to it and start referencing it. Ultimately, we started to re-embrace the Zeppelin, Beatles, Sabbath and Pink Floyd. I think they were always there. At some point, we had to look back and say, 'This has a lot to do with our upbringing.' It's a weird story, but it may explain why, for a few years, we denied the Zeppelin-Sabbath influence.

Though the influence of Led Zeppelin was evident, Q magazine noted that Soundgarden were "in thrall to '70s rock, but contemptuous of the genre's overt sexism and machismo."

The Butthole Surfers' mix of punk, heavy metal and noise rock was a major influence on the early work of Soundgarden. Soundgarden, like other early grunge bands, were also influenced by British post-punk bands such as Gang of Four and Bauhaus which were popular in the early 1980s Seattle scene. The band was also influenced by the likes of the Ramones, MC5, Kiss, Accept, the Melvins, Saint Vitus, and Trouble.

The name of the band, according to Thayil, was supposed to include the many roots of their style: that included "a virtual plethora of cutting edge rock that spans Velvet Underground, Meat Puppets, and Killing Joke". The band also mentioned "Metallica Gothicism and sublime poetry. The almost ethereal flavour of the name betrays the brutality of the music but never pins Soundgarden in one corner". In addition to Metallica, the band were admirers of the 1980s thrash metal scene, including bands like Exodus, Metal Church, Voivod, and Dark Angel.

Cornell himself said: "When Soundgarden formed we were post-punk – pretty quirky. Then somehow we found this neo-Sabbath psychedelic rock that fitted well with who we were."

Soundgarden broadened its musical range with its later releases. By 1994's Superunknown, the band began to incorporate more psychedelic influences into its music. Cornell also became known for his wide vocal range and his dark, existentialist lyrics.

Soundgarden also used unorthodox time signatures; "Fell on Black Days" is in 6/4, "Limo Wreck" is played in 15/8, and "The Day I Tried to Live" alternates between 7/8 and 4/4 sections. The main guitar riff of "Circle of Power" is in 5/4. The E strings of the instruments were at times tuned even lower, such as on "Rusty Cage", where the lower E is tuned down to B. Some songs use more unorthodox tunings: "Been Away Too Long", "My Wave", and "The Day I Tried to Live" are all in a E–E–B–B–B–B tuning and "Burden in My Hand", "Head Down", and "Pretty Noose" in a tuning of C-G-C-G-G-E". Thayil has said Soundgarden usually did not consider the time signature of a song until after the band wrote it, and said the use of odd meters was "a total accident". He also used the meters as an example of the band's anti-commercial stance, saying that if Soundgarden "were in the business of hit singles, we'd at least write songs in 4/4 so you could dance to them".

== Legacy ==
The development of the Seattle independent record label Sub Pop Records is tied closely to Soundgarden (due to Sub Pop co-founder Jonathan Poneman funding Soundgarden's early releases), and the success of the band resulted in the expansion of Sub Pop as a serious record label.

Nirvana frontman Kurt Cobain was a fan of Soundgarden's music, and reportedly Soundgarden's involvement with Sub Pop influenced Cobain to sign Nirvana with the label. Cobain also stated that Soundgarden was one of the only Seattle bands that he liked along with Tad and Mudhoney. In rare footage from the 2015 documentary Kurt Cobain: Montage of Heck, Cobain can be seen impersonating Chris Cornell singing "Outshined". Alice in Chains guitarist and vocalist Jerry Cantrell stated that Soundgarden was a big influence on his band.

Soundgarden was the first grunge band to sign to a major label when the band joined the roster of A&M Records in 1988. However, Soundgarden did not achieve success initially, and only with successive album releases did the band meet with increased sales and wider attention. Bassist Ben Shepherd has not been receptive to the grunge label, saying in a 2013 interview, "That's just marketing. It's called rock and roll, or it's called punk rock or whatever. We never were grunge, we were just a band from Seattle." They were ranked No. 14 on VH1's 100 Greatest Artists of Hard Rock.

In 1994, Electronic Arts contacted Soundgarden's label A&M Records for a bid to license the band's music for a CD-based entry in the Road Rash video game series. Although the label was initially hesitant due to the lack of precedence for licensing music for video games, Cornell and his band members expressed enthusiasm, as they were fans of the games and frequently played them on their bus while touring the country. A&M then obtained the band's permission to use them as leverage to incorporate other alt-rock bands within the A&M label into the game, including Monster Magnet, Paw, Swervedriver, Therapy? and Hammerbox. As a result of Soundgarden's involvement, the 3DO version of Road Rash has been credited with revolutionizing the use of licensed music in video games.

Regarding Soundgarden's legacy, in a 2007 interview Cornell said:

I think, and this is now with some distance in listening to the records, but on the outside looking in with all earnestness I think Soundgarden made the best records out of that scene. I think we were the most daring and experimental and genre-pushing really and I'm really proud of it. And I guess that's why I have trepidation about the idea of re-forming. I don't know what it would mean, or I guess I just have this image of who we were and I had probably a lot of anxiety during the period of being Soundgarden, as we all did, that it was responsibility and it was an important band and music and we didn't want to mess it up and we managed to not, which I feel is a great achievement.

Soundgarden has been praised for its technical musical ability, and the expansion of its sound as the band's career progressed. "Heavy yet ethereal, powerful yet always-in-control, Soundgarden's music was a study in contrasts," said Henry Wilson of Hit Parader. Wilson proclaimed the band's music as "a brilliant display of technical proficiency tempered by heart-felt emotion".

Soundgarden is one of the bands credited with the development of the alternative metal genre, with AllMusic's Stephen Thomas Erlewine stating that "Soundgarden made a place for heavy metal in alternative rock." Ben Ratliff of Rolling Stone defined Soundgarden as the "standard-bearers" of the rock riff during the 1990s.

Several bands and artists from different genres have cited Soundgarden as an influence, including Biffy Clyro, Stabbing Westward, the Dillinger Escape Plan, Cave In, Iceburn, Taproot, The Fierce and the Dead, and Amy Lee of Evanescence. The members of Pantera have cited Soundgarden's second album Louder Than Love as one of the inspirations behind the direction change from glam metal to a more heavier groove sound on their 1990 album Cowboys from Hell, which also prompted the band to hire Terry Date to produce it. Metallica guitarist Kirk Hammett has claimed that the riffs for "Enter Sandman" were inspired by Soundgarden.

In 2017, Metal Injection ranked Soundgarden at number three on their list of 10 Heaviest Grunge Bands. Loudwire recognizes Soundgarden as one of the "big four" bands of grunge, alongside Alice in Chains, Pearl Jam, and Nirvana.

== Band members ==
- Chris Cornell – lead vocals (1984–1997, 2010–2017; his death), rhythm guitar (1988–1997, 2010–2017), drums (1984–1985)
- Kim Thayil – lead guitar (1984–1997, 2010–2017, 2019, 2025), rhythm guitar (1984–1988, 2019, 2025)
- Hiro Yamamoto – bass, backing vocals (1984–1989, 2025)
- Scott Sundquist – drums (1985–1986)
- Matt Cameron – drums, percussion, backing vocals (1986–1997, 2010–2017, 2019, 2025)
- Jason Everman – bass (1989–1990)
- Ben Shepherd – bass (1990–1997, 2010–2017, 2019, 2025), backing vocals (1994–1997, 2010–2017, 2019)

== Discography ==
=== Studio albums ===
- Ultramega OK (1988)
- Louder Than Love (1989)
- Badmotorfinger (1991)
- Superunknown (1994)
- Down on the Upside (1996)
- King Animal (2012)

== Awards and nominations ==
Clio Awards

Year	Nominee / work	Award	Result
1995	"Black Hole Sun"	Alternative Music Video	Won

Grammy Awards

Year	Nominated work	Award	Result
1990	Ultramega OK	Best Metal Performance	Nominated
1992	Badmotorfinger	Best Metal Performance	Nominated
1993	"Into the Void (Sealth)"	Best Metal Performance	Nominated
1995	Spoonman	Best Metal Performance	Won
1995	"Black Hole Sun"	Best Hard Rock Performance	Won
1995	"Black Hole Sun"	Best Rock Song	Nominated
1995	Superunknown	Best Rock Album	Nominated
1997	"Pretty Noose"	Best Hard Rock Performance	Nominated
2011	"Black Rain"	Best Hard Rock Performance	Nominated

MTV Europe Music Awards

Year	Nominee / work	Award	Result
1994	Soundgarden	Best Rock	Nominated

MTV Video Music Awards

Year	Nominee / work	Award	Result
1994	"Black Hole Sun"	Best Metal/Hard Rock Video	Won

Northwest Area Music Awards

Year	Nominee / work	Award	Result
1991	Chris Cornell	Best Male Vocalist	Won
1991	Matt Cameron	Best Musician - Drums	Won
1991	Soundgarden	Best Rock Group	Won
1992	Matt Cameron	Best Drums	Won
1992	Chris Cornell	Best Male Vocalist	Won
1992	Badmotorfinger	Best Metal Album	Won
1992	Soundgarden	Best Metal Group	Won

Revolver Music Awards

Year	Nominee / work	Award	Result
2013	King Animal	Album of the Year	Nominated
2013	Soundgarden	Comeback of the Year	Nominated
2013	Kim Thayil	Best Guitarist	Nominated
2013	Chris Cornell	Best Vocalist	Nominated

Rock and Roll Hall of Fame

Year	Nominee / work	Award	Result
2020	Soundgarden	Performers	Nominated
2023	Soundgarden	Performers	Nominated
2025	Soundgarden	Performers	Won

== Bibliography ==
- Nickson, Chris (1995). Soundgarden: New Metal Crown. St. Martin's Griffin. ISBN 978-0-312-13607-9.
- Prato, Greg (2009). Grunge Is Dead: The Oral History of Seattle Rock Music. ECW Press. ISBN 978-1-55022-877-9.
- Prato, Greg (2019). Dark Black and Blue: The Soundgarden Story. Independently published. ISBN 978-1-69108-613-9.
- English, Mike & Jaye (2015). Photofantasm Soundgarden: Nudedragons to King Animal. Spoondog Entertainment Group. ISBN 978-0-988530-01-0.
