= Ben Shepherd =

American musician (born 1968)

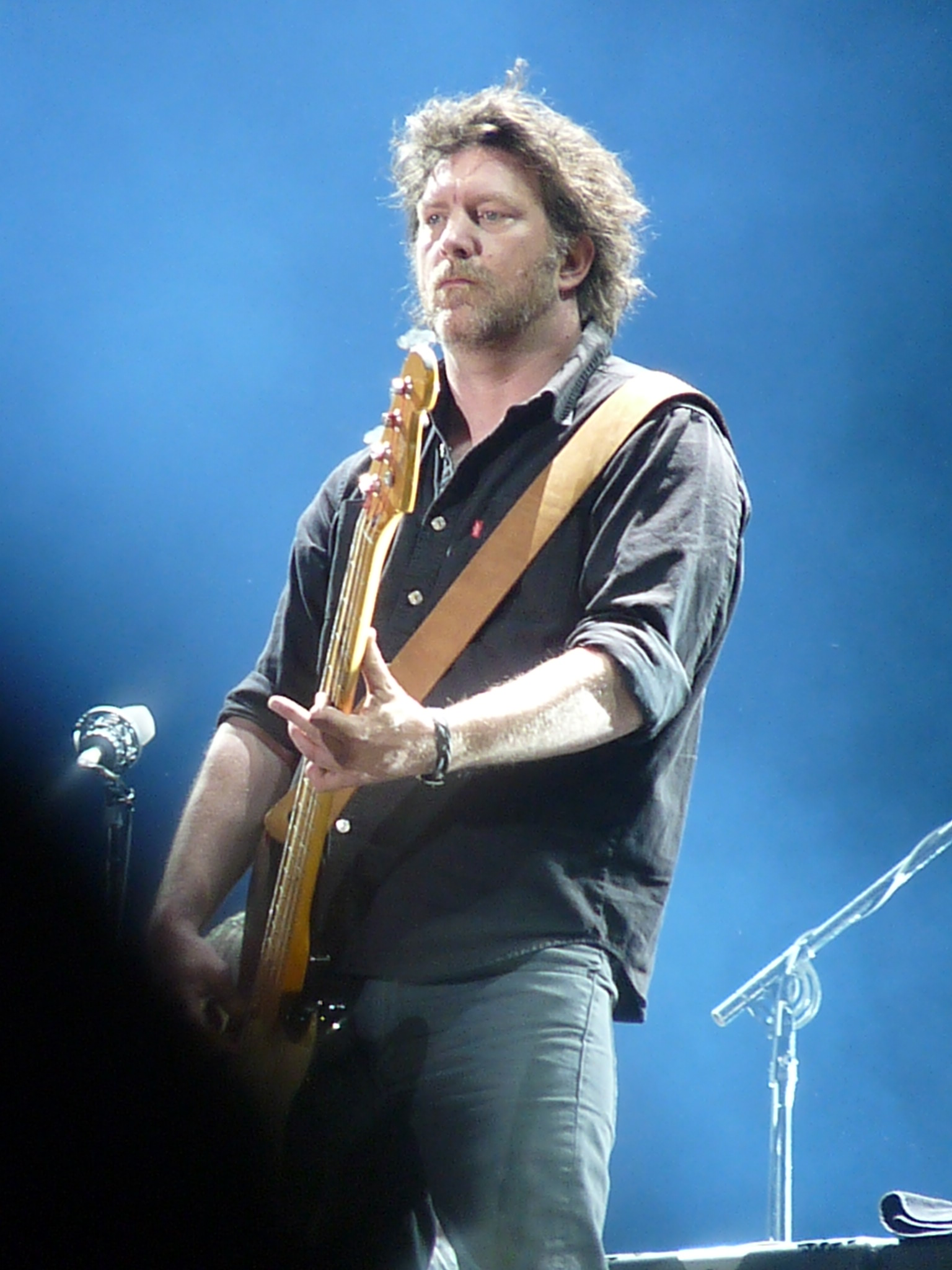
- Shepherd in 2012

Background information
- Also known as: HBS
- Born: Hunter Benedict Shepherd; September 20, 1968 (age 57); Okinawa, USCAR (now Okinawa, Japan)
- Origin: Seattle, Washington, U.S.
- Genres: Alternative metal; grunge; alternative rock; heavy metal
- Occupations: Musician, songwriter
- Instruments: Bass; vocals; guitar
- Years active: 1990–present
- Labels: Sub Pop; A&M; Burn Burn Burn; Dine Alone Records (Canada)

Hunter Benedict Shepherd (born September 20, 1968) is an American musician best known as the bassist of rock band Soundgarden, with whom he has won two Grammy Awards.

Born in Okinawa, Shepherd grew up in Washington and developed an interest in music after watching Johnny Cash on TV. He played in various punk-rock bands and eventually joined Soundgarden as their bassist in 1990. Shepherd contributed to the band's musical evolution and played a significant role in songwriting. In 1993, he formed a side project, Hater, with Matt Cameron and John McBain. Soundgarden broke up in 1997, leading Shepherd to struggle with addiction and personal issues. He played in various bands before Soundgarden reunited in 2010, continuing until Chris Cornell's death in 2017.

Shepherd released a solo album, In Deep Owl, in 2013, and has two children. He partially owns an upscale Seattle bar, Hazlewood, and resides on Bainbridge Island, Washington.

== Early life ==
Shepherd was born in an American military base in Okinawa. His father worked in the Nike missile program and played the guitar. His family moved to Allen, Texas, then settled in Kingston, Washington, where Shepherd grew up. Shepherd became interested in music after listening to Johnny Cash on television. When Shepherd asked his father for a guitar, his father complied only after insisting he must learn every chord in a large book with nothing but a guitar neck. Shepherd did so—with help from his cousin Ralph "Tony" McMullen—and his father bought him his first guitar.

Shepherd played in numerous punk-rock bands with friends as a teenager like March of Crimes, Mind Circus and 600 School, meeting future musicians such as Stone Gossard, Krist Novoselic and Matt Cameron. After graduating from high school, he worked as a carpenter and a laborer, and while playing in Tic Dolly Row with drummer friend Chad Channing, introduced him to Novoselic, who went on to bring Channing into his band Nirvana. Shepherd would later travel with Nirvana on a tour leading up to the release of Nevermind, being a nominal second guitarist but not playing on stage.

== Musical career ==
=== Soundgarden (1990–1997) ===
Shepherd was a fan of Soundgarden ever since their early days as a three-piece. Once bassist Hiro Yamamoto left in 1989, Shepherd auditioned to replace him even as his primary instrument was the guitar. The band members liked Shepherd and his attitude, but given he did not know how to play the songs, they eventually picked bassist Jason Everman. Following the closure of the Louder Than Love tour in 1990, Everman was fired, and the band contacted Shepherd to see if he could join the band. His introduction was deemed by Soundgarden as helpful towards their musical evolution, bringing his own compositions that showed a new style, and guitarist Kim Thayil adding that Shepherd gave "a creative and emotional punch".

In addition to his role as bass player, Shepherd's role as a singer and songwriter increased during his tenure with Soundgarden. On his first recording with the band, the studio album Badmotorfinger, Shepherd took part in writing the following songs: "Slaves & Bulldozers" (music, co-written), "Jesus Christ Pose" (music, co-written), "Face Pollution" (music), and "Somewhere" (music and lyrics). Shepherd also introduced some of the now signature alternate tunings to the band, such as in the singles "The Day I Tried To Live", "My Wave", "Pretty Noose", and "Burden in My Hand".

In 1993, Shepherd and Soundgarden drummer Matt Cameron formed a side-project band called Hater with John McBain of Monster Magnet. Shepherd sang vocals and played guitar in Hater, in addition to writing several songs on the band's first release, a self-titled album. A second album called The 2nd was recorded in 1995 after Superunknown tour's end, but was not released until 2005, ten years later.

In 1994, Soundgarden released Superunknown, which featured Shepherd's compositions "Half" and "Head Down". The latter of which was heavily influenced by The Beatles and was written after experimenting with mic placement on his Gibson L-50, picking up the guitar and strumming it to find he liked the wildly out of tune sound, making up the song's composition on the spot. "Half" was marked by an Indian flavor and was the first song on a Soundgarden album for which Shepherd sang lead vocals. Shepherd has said that "Half" was a song he wrote in case his daughter ever wanted to learn guitar.

In 1996, Soundgarden released Down on the Upside, in which six of the sixteen album tracks were lyrically and/or musically composed by Shepherd. The tracks were: "Zero Chance" (music), "Dusty" (music), "Ty Cobb" (music), "Never Named" (music) "Switch Opens" (music) and "An Unkind" (music and lyrics). Shepherd once said he penned the music for "Never Named" at the age of sixteen. "Ty Cobb" was the first song Shepherd wrote that was made a single.

The Down on the Upside tour ended on February 9, 1997, in Honolulu, with an acrimonious meltdown started by Shepherd. With the band in a bad mood and facing technical problems in their performance, Shepherd eventually got so frustrated he smashed his bass during "Blow Up the Outside World", gave the audience the finger and left the stage. He later said, "I'd had it up to here with my equipment dying. So I wasn't going to stand onstage and fake what I was playing." He then started a heated argument with Thayil backstage that nearly escalated into a fistfight, leading to only Cornell and Cameron returning for the encore. Two months later, Soundgarden announced it was breaking up, citing dissatisfaction and artistic differences.

=== Post-Soundgarden (1997–2010) ===
Shepherd said that he was the one most affected by Soundgarden's breakup: "my fiancée broke up with me; and then I broke three ribs. I got addicted to pain pills, drank a ton, and wound up OD'ing on morphine. I was laid out in my house for five days, and no one knew it. It was a fucking horrible time — this total rock'n'roll cliché."

Hater also disbanded, but he, Cameron, and McBain would go on to form Wellwater Conspiracy with several other artists. Shepherd was the lead vocalist on the first Wellwater Conspiracy album, Declaration of Conformity. In 1998, he quit Wellwater Conspiracy for unknown reasons. Matt Cameron took over lead vocals.

In the years after the split, Shepherd participated in some of Josh Homme's Desert Sessions collaboration (Volumes 1 & 2), on which he played bass and guitar, and played bass with Mark Lanegan (in the 1999 album I'll Take Care of You and 2001's Field Songs, where he even wrote co-wrote the song "Blues For D"), and Tony Iommi (2000's Iommi). In 2005, Shepherd formed the shortly lived band Unkmongoni and released the second Hater album, The 2nd.

In 2008, following the sale of the warehouse Soundgarden's equipment was being stored in, Shepherd was robbed of all his equipment including guitars, basses, and amplifiers collected and used through Soundgarden's career, and two records he had completed. Following the incident, a downtrodden Shepherd decided to quit music altogether and became a carpenter's assistant until he was eventually coerced into making his solo record In Deep Owl and reuniting with Soundgarden shortly thereafter.

In an August 2010 feature about the Soundgarden reunion with Spin, Shepherd stated that before reuniting he was "totally broke" and was sleeping on friends' couches. Shepherd has since downplayed the statement, stating that he was only "sleeping on couches in studios when I was recording my solo album", preferring to stay in Seattle rather than go back home to Bainbridge Island.

=== Soundgarden reunion (2010–2017) ===
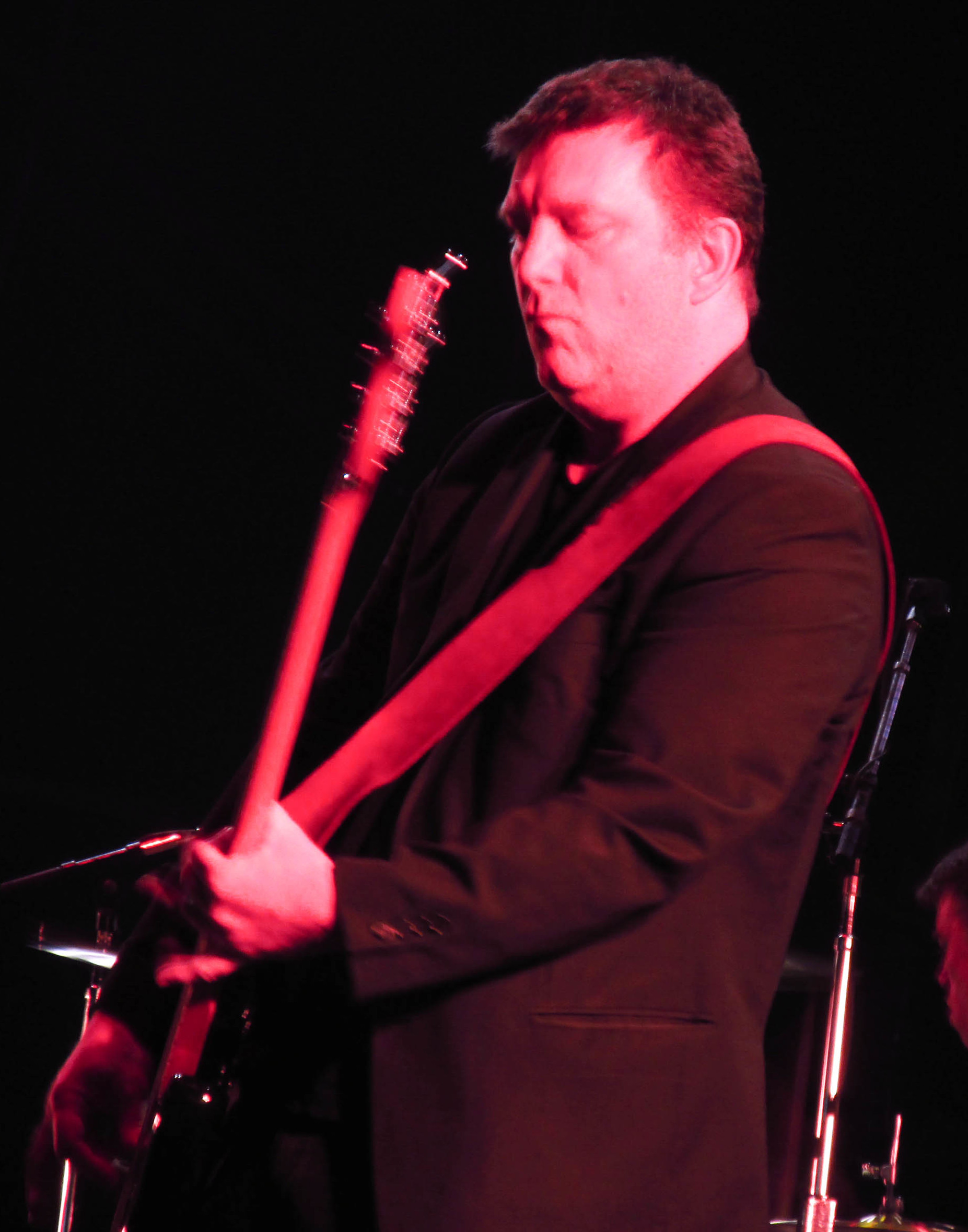
Shepherd in 2015

On January 1, 2010, Chris Cornell confirmed that Soundgarden would reunite, with Shepherd playing as their bassist again. The band played its first show in 13 years on April 16, 2010, at Seattle's Showbox theater under the anagram Nudedragons.

The group released the compilation album Telephantasm in September 2010, followed by King Animal in November 2012, their first studio album since 1996. Shepherd's contributions included two songs which he had written years before and recorded in the eventually stolen demos, "Taree" and "Attrition", and two collaborations with Cornell, "Been Away Too Long" and "Rowing".

The band continued to tour frequently, arranging time around Matt Cameron's schedule in Pearl Jam, and Chris Cornell's acoustic tours. In 2014, the band released a reissue of their 1994 album Superunknown as part of its twentieth anniversary and has toured with drummer Matt Chamberlain filling in for Cameron.

Chris Cornell's sudden death on May 18, 2017, resulted in the cancellation of the rest of their tour.

=== Solo project ===
In the summer of 2010, Shepherd finished recording his latest solo project. He began writing the record in 2009. It started out as an acoustic project, before morphing into a very electrified concept album in the end. Shepherd originally intended for the songs to be just voice and acoustic guitar, but soon Matt Cameron and Matt Chamberlain offered up their services on drums. The album was recorded by Dave French, at a few different studios including KAOS in Georgetown, and The Studio With No Name in Interbay. The album was finished, mixed/mastered at Robert Lang Studios by Adam Kasper and contains a recording of frog ribbits.

On June 25, 2013, Shepherd announced he would be releasing the solo album entitled In Deep Owl on August 27, 2013, under the name HBS. Shepherd premiered the first single "Baron Robber" on Spin. Featured musicians include:

- Ben Shepherd – Guitar, Bass guitar, Vocals, Mandolin, Drums
- Matt Cameron – Drums, percussion
- Matt Chamberlain – Drums, percussion
- Joseph Braley – Drums, percussion
- Greg Gilmore – Drums, percussion
- Klaus – Winds (Sax)

== Personal life ==
Shepherd has two children. He currently resides on Bainbridge Island, Washington. Shepherd is also the partial owner of an upscale Seattle bar called Hazlewood.

== Musical style ==
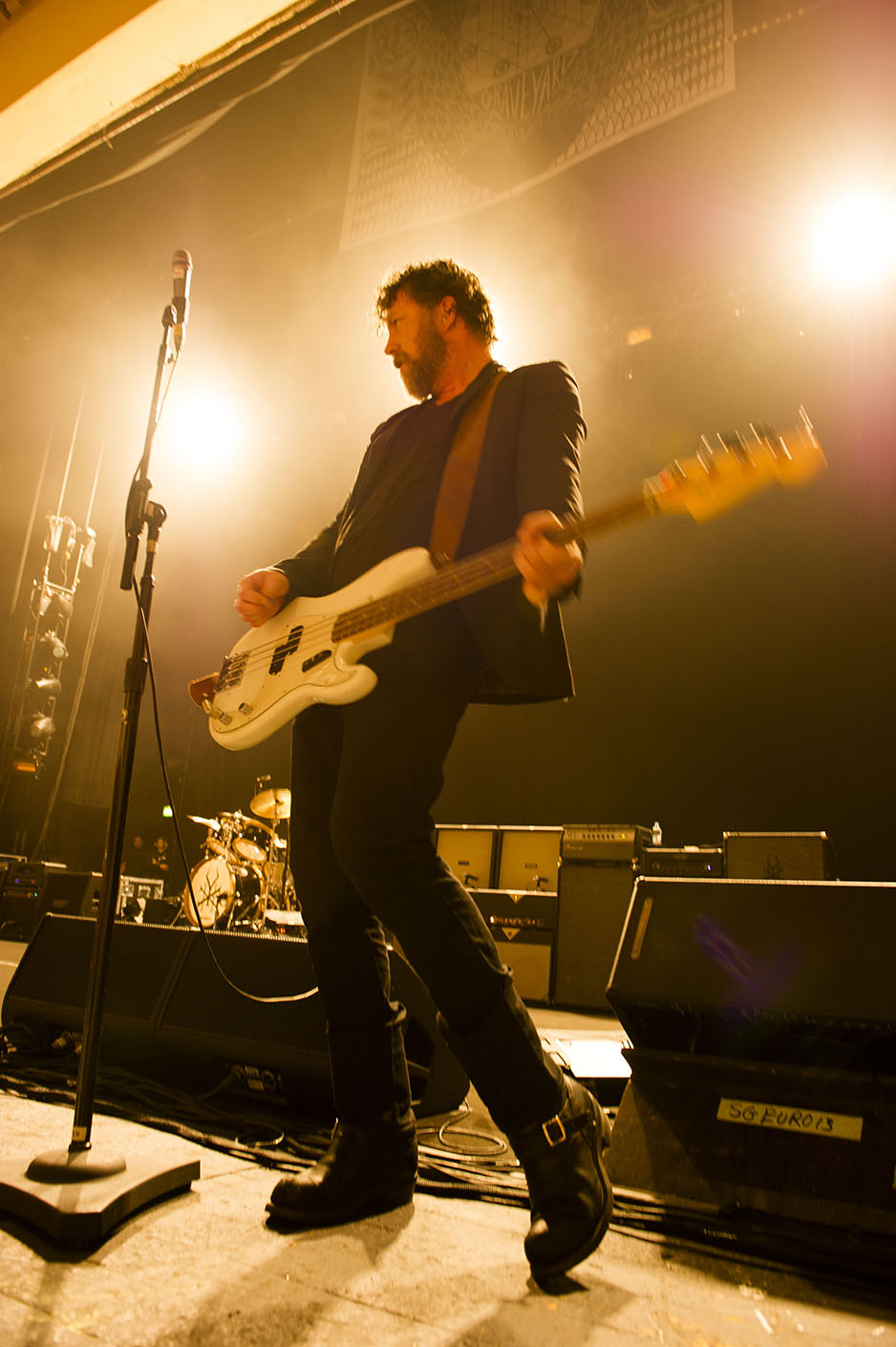
Shepherd in 2013

Shepherd started playing bass trying to replace former Soundgarden bassist Hiro Yamamoto. He considers his predecessor a major influence, particularly as Yamamoto differed from bassists "relegated to a role of following along", even if his bass "was mixed so damn quietly on the recordings that I could never hear him well enough to develop a deep understanding of his fluidity or his textures."

Shepherd followed a fingerstyle playing based on Yamamoto, punk rock musicians Chuck Dukowski from Black Flag, and Mike Watt. He also listened to jazz bassist Charles Mingus "because I wanted to learn how to play some dirty, weird shit." Certain songs have Shepherd using a pick to provide "different textures". Shepherd considers that he approaches guitars "like a horn section", split between rhythm and lead, while "Bass is more fluid; you're a lot more free to do stuff because it's a song within a song". Rather than the more common practice of synchronizing with the drummer, Shepherd's preference is to play the bass along to the vocals, as "it helps to harmonize".

As a singer, Shepherd described himself as "trying to find out who I sound like, not like someone else." Composing is usually done by Shepherd on the guitar, given all other Soundgarden members play that instrument. Bass-minded tracks such as "Switch Opens" are rare because, as he explained "you don't want to write a whole wandering bass line wondering what the drum beat and the guitar chords are going to be."

== Musical equipment ==
In 2008, Shepherd had all of his equipment stolen from Soundgarden's storage warehouse, forcing him to buy new instruments and amplifiers.

=== Pre theft gear ===
Guitars

- 1976–1979 Fender Jazz Bass - Originally owned by the Wood brothers and used by Andy while in Malfunkshun, Shepherd purchased this black Jazz Bass for the Soundgarden auditions, and nicknamed it "Tree" because of its heavy weight. It was his go-to instrument for his entire stint in Soundgarden from his initial tryout in 1989 to the band's break up in 1997. In addition to actually learning on the bass, it was used on the bulk of recording Badmotorfinger, Superunknown, and Down on the Upside, and saw heavy touring during the Badmotorfinger era as his main bass and later tours for alternate tunings.
- 1967–1970 Fender Jazz Bass - Black with a matching headstock and a "block & bound" rosewood fretboard, used as Ben's main bass during the Superunknown European tour. It was also featured prominently in the "Fell On Black Days" and "My Wave" videos.
- 1967-–1974 Fender Precision Bass - Olympic White finish, tortoise pickguard, rosewood fretboard and equipped with EMG PJ pickups, featured in the "Rusty Cage" video, used briefly as Ben's main before being adapted as the bass tuned to EEBB for "Somewhere", which it remained through the Badmotorfinger and Superunknown tours.
- 1981 Fender Precision Bass - Finished in "Capri Orange", part of a limited edition of colors Fender only did in 1981 known as the "International Colors". It had a maple fretboard and kept its bridge and pickup covers. Used during most of the Superunknown American tour and seen in the "Black Hole Sun" video.
- 1963-–1965 Fender Jazz Bass - Finished in extremely rare custom color "Sherwood Green" with a matching headstock, used on MTV Live and Loud and UK tour in 1996.
- 1995 Fender 51 Precision Bass Custom - Limited production run Custom Shop bass in 2 tone sunburst over an Ash body with a 60s style "PJ" pickup arrangement and "stack knob" concentric early Jazz Bass controls. Used on Lollapalloza 1996 and the Down on the Upside tour as the main bass.
- Music Man StingRay - Black model with maple fretboard and a sunburst model with a rosewood fretboard used for alternate tunings in 1996.
- 1967–1970 Mosrite Mark X - Post Ventures 2 pickup model bass, 1 of 3 finished in a factory silver color. Used on Soundgarden's performance on Saturday Night Live, and Lollapalooza '96.
- 1974–1979 Fender Jazz Bass - Ben had two identical basses to "Tree" used live in 1995 and an Olympic White model for alternate tunings on the Superunknown tour.
- Rickenbacker 4001 - Black model used toward the end of Lollapalooza '92.
- Rickenbacker 3001 - Sunburst model used on the live dates in 1993.
- Fender American Standard Jazz Bass - Ben used a couple of these from '94 to '97, including Black and Olympic White models with rosewood or maple fretboards.
- Fender Mexican Standard Jazz Bass - Red model used on the Big Day Out '94 and a white model used from late '96 to Soundgarden's final show ending in its destruction.
- 1965-1969 Gibson Thunderbird IV - "Non-Reverse" two pickup model in custom color Cardinal Red. Seen briefly in the Hater video "Who Do I Kill?"
- Gibson EB-2 - Seen used late in the Down On The Upside tour, circa December 1996.
- Mosrite Combo Bass - Sunburst model used with Mark Lanegan.
- Hofner 500/1 - Vintage model used in the second version of the "Pretty Noose" video and in the studio during the Down On The Upside sessions.
- Harmony H22/1 - Used in the "Blow Up the Outside World" video.
- Vox Cougar Bass
- Micro Frets Stage II Bass
- Gretsch Country Gentleman - Late 70's model, with Hi Lo 'Tron pickups and Bigsby B12 vibrato.
- Gibson L-50 - Used to write and record "Head Down" among other things.
- 1964 Fender Jaguar - Candy Apple Red, matching headstock, tort pickguard. Used in Hater.
- 1961 Gretsch Corvette 6132 - Used in Hater.
- Gibson Les Paul Custom - 3 pickup Bigsby model re-issue used in Hater.

Amplifiers

- Ampeg SVT
- Ampeg 810 Cabinet
- Mesa Boogie 400+
- Mesa Boogie Big Block 750
- Mesa Boogie Diesel/Road Ready Cabs (2x15's, 4x10's, or 8x10's, often mixed)

Ben used a mixture of Ampeg and Mesa for recording, but led more to the Mesa's live in Soundgarden.

=== Post theft gear ===
Guitars

- Fender Precision Bass - Once Shepherd was invited for the Soundgarden reunion in 2010, he purchased a P-Bass, and this model has become his standard instrument ever since. The Precision was praised by Shepherd for "immediate response and heaviness", compared to the less resonating sound of the Jazz.
  - Fender 50s Precision Bass - Mexican reissue in Black. Ben owns two of these and also owns and uses a "Road Worn" version in Sunburst. His main Black P is called "Baron" and its twin backup is named "Mulo". The Sunburst is named "Wolfgang".
  - Fender American Vintage 62 Precision Bass - "Lena" Olympic White, tort guard.
  - Fender American Vintage 63 Precision Bass - Olympic White, mint guard.
  - Fender Japan 51 Precision Bass - Blonde finish, named "Blood". Has a Jazz Bass pickup in place of the regular 51 style single coil.
  - Fender Cabronita Precision Bass - Black 51 style P Bass with Gretsch-style Fedeli'tron humbucker pickup.
  - Fender Factory Special Run Precision Basses - Owns a Deluxe PJ in Seafoam Pearl and an American Special in Honey Burst.
- Fender American Standard Jazz Bass - Ben owns two of these, both in Charcoal Frost Metallic, mostly used during performances with Chris Cornell on Acoustic. His favored is named "Echo", with his #2 named "Ivan".
- Rickenbacker 4001 - Black model named "Balderdash".
- Fender Telecaster Bass - Black late 70s model, featuring Fender's Wide Range "Mudbucker" in the neck.
- Gibson RD Artist Bass - Tuned to C-F-C-G for the song "4th of July".
- Gibson Ripper - Seen used in studio work.
- Gibson EB Bass - Not like the SG styled EB-0 or EB-3, more like an upside-down Mosrite with two humbuckers, a 2014 model in Bullion Gold vintage gloss.
- Music Man StingRay - Black model with a maple fretboard, as well as an El Dorado Gold model with a rosewood fretboard.
- Trussart Steelcaster Bass - An all-metal bass. Built by James Trussart in France in a 51 P Bass style with Jazz Bass pickups.
- Airline Map Bass - Wooden re-issue of the fiberglass guitars of the '60s.
- Fender Geddy Lee Jazz Bass - Used at the "Tadgarden" show.
- Hofner 500/1 - Goldtop Icon B-Bass reissue model. 1 of 150.
- Harmony Sovereign - Acoustic given to Ben by the owners of the OK Hotel in Seattle after their live music venue was destroyed following an earthquake.
- Fender Telecaster Designer Series
- Gibson ES-140
- Gibson SG GT

Amplifiers

- Ampeg SVT VR
- Ampeg SVT 810AV and 610AV Cabs
- Mesa Boogie M6 Carbine
- Mesa Boogie PH 1000 Cab (sometimes used)

Pedals

- Mesa Boogie V-Twin Pre-amp (x2)
- Dunlop Cry Baby Bass Wah
- BOSS RC-3 Loop Station

=== Strings and modifications ===
Shepherd uses GHS Bass Boomers Heavy gauge (50–115), and likes them to be as worn as possible, oftentimes leaving them on for years until they eventually break. Shepherd has used the Leo Quan Badass Bass II bridge and continues to use them on almost all his Fenders. He as of late has also equipped his basses with stereo output jacks for durability.

== Discography ==
=== HBS ===
- In Deep Owl (2013)
- The Star Chief Chronicles EP (2025)

=== 600 School ===
- Live recording (circa 1982)

=== March of Crimes ===
- Fairweather Friend demo (recorded circa 1984)

=== Tic Dolly Row ===
- Live recording (1987)

=== Soundgarden ===
- Badmotorfinger (1991)
- Superunknown (1994)
- Songs from the Superunknown (1995)
- Down on the Upside (1996)
- A-Sides (1997)
- Telephantasm (2010)
- Live on I-5 (2011)
- King Animal (2012)

=== Hater ===
- Hater (1993) - vocals, guitar
- "Convicted", a song recorded for Hempilation: Freedom Is NORML (1995) - vocals, guitar
- The 2nd (2005) - lead vocals, guitar, piano

=== Wellwater Conspiracy ===
- Declaration of Conformity (1997) - vocals

=== With Mark Lanegan ===
- I'll Take Care of You (1999) - bass
- Field Songs (2001) - acoustic & electric guitar, bass, piano, vocals, lap steel guitar; wrote track 10, "Blues for D"

=== Ten Commandos ===
- Ten Commandos (2015)

== Bibliography ==
- Prato, Greg (2009). Grunge is Dead:The Oral History of Seattle Rock Music. ICW Press. ISBN 978-1554903474.
