= Matt Cameron discography =

Matt Cameron is an American musician, serving as drummer for rock bands Pearl Jam and Soundgarden. He also has contributed to other musical projects.

== Solo discography ==
| Year | Title | Label | Track(s) |
|---|---|---|---|
| 2017 | Cavedweller | Migraine Music | All |
| 2023 | Gory Scorch Cretins | Keep It Trippy Records | All |

== Skin Yard discography ==
| Year | Title | Label | Track(s) |
|---|---|---|---|
| 1986 | Deep Six | C/Z | "Throb" and "The Birds" |
| 1986 | Skin Yard | Cruz | All except "Bleed" and "Out of the Attic" |
| 2001 | Start at the Top | Cruz | "Twelve Points" and "Make Room" |

== Tone Dogs discography ==
| Year | Title | Label | Track(s) |
|---|---|---|---|
| 1990 | Ankety Low Day | C/Z | All |

== Temple of the Dog discography ==
| Year | Title | Label | Track(s) |
|---|---|---|---|
| 1991 | Temple of the Dog | A&M | All |

== Hater discography ==
| Year | Title | Label | Track(s) |
|---|---|---|---|
| 1993 | Hater | A&M | All |
| 1995 | Hempilation: Freedom Is NORML | Volcano | "Convicted" |
| 2005 | The 2nd | Barsuk | All |

== Wellwater Conspiracy discography ==
| Year | Title | Label | Track(s) |
|---|---|---|---|
| 1995 | Succour: The Terrascope Benefit Album | Flydaddy | "Far Side of Your Moon" |
| 1997 | Declaration of Conformity | Third Gear | All |
| 1999 | Brotherhood of Electric: Operational Directives | Time Bomb | All |
| 2001 | The Scroll and Its Combinations | TVT | All |
| 2003 | Wellwater Conspiracy | Megaforce | All |

== Harrybu McCage discography ==
| Year | Title | Label | Track(s) |
|---|---|---|---|
| 2008 | Harrybu McCage | Monkeywrench | All |

== Ten Commandos discography ==
| Year | Title | Label | Track(s) |
|---|---|---|---|
| 2015 | Ten Commandos | Monkeywrench | All |

== Contributions and collaborations ==
| Year | Group | Title | Label | Track(s) |
|---|---|---|---|---|
| 1993 | M.A.C.C. (Mike McCready, Jeff Ament, Matt Cameron, and Chris Cornell) | Stone Free: A Tribute to Jimi Hendrix | Reprise/WEA | "Hey Baby (Land of the New Rising Sun)" |
| 1995 | Eleven | Thunk | Hollywood | "Why", "Seasick of You", "Big Sleep", and "No Ground" |
| 1995 | Seaweed | Spanaway | Hollywood | "Magic Mountainman" |
| 1996 | Kristen Barry | Home Alive: The Art of Self Defense | Epic | "Joyride" |
| 1996 | Queens of the Stone Age (known as Gamma Ray) | Gamma Ray | Man's Ruin | "Born to Hula" |
| 1997 | The Prodigy | The Fat of the Land | XL | "Narayan" |
| 1997 | Matt Cameron and Taz Bentley | Flyin' Traps: Stereo Drums | Hollywood | "Theme From Wrong Holy-O" |
| 1997 | Queens of the Stone Age | Kyuss/Queens of the Stone Age | Man's Ruin | "Born to Hula" |
| 1998 | Stegosaurus | Stegosaurus | Reprise | "Not Defeat Myself", "Candy", and "At the Water" |
| 1998 | The Smashing Pumpkins | Adore | Virgin | "For Martha" |
| 1999 | Amy Denio | Greatest Hits | Unit Circle | "(When George Bush Was Head Of The) C.I.A.", "Secret Crush", "Brave It", and "Traffic Island Psycho" |
| 1999 | Chris Cornell | Euphoria Morning | Interscope | "Disappearing One" |
| 2000 | Tony Iommi | Iommi | Divine/Priority | "Time Is Mine", "Flame On", "Just Say No to Love", and "Into the Night" |
| 2000 | Geddy Lee | My Favourite Headache | Atlantic | All except "Home on the Strange" |
| 2001 | Our Lady Peace | Spiritual Machines | Columbia | "Right Behind You (Mafia)" and "Are You Sad?" |
| 2001 | The Smashing Pumpkins | Judas O | Virgin | "Because You Are" |
| 2002 | The Walkabouts | Ended Up a Stranger | Interstate | - |
| 2002 | Aya | Senjou no Hana | BMG | All |
| 2002 | Chad Kroeger featuring Josey Scott | Spider-Man: Music from and Inspired By | Sony | "Hero" |
| 2002 | Burden Brothers | Queen O' Spades | Last Beat | "Walk Away" |
| 2006 | Peter Frampton | Fingerprints | A&M | "Black Hole Sun" and "Blowin' Smoke" |
| 2008 | The Bergevin Brothers | Seven Songs for America and One for the World | Bergevin Brothers Music | All |
| 2013 | Weiss / Cameron / Hill | Drumgasm | Jackpot | All |
| 2020 | Hifiklub / Cameron / Daffodil / Reuben Lewis | Rupture | Electric Valley Records | All |
| 2021 | The Pretty Reckless | Death by Rock and Roll | Fearless | "Only Love Can Save Me Now" |
| 2024 | Nando Reis | Uma Estrela Misteriosa Revelará o Segredo | Relicário | "Estrela Misteriosa" |
