= Hal Blaine =

American drummer (1929–2019)

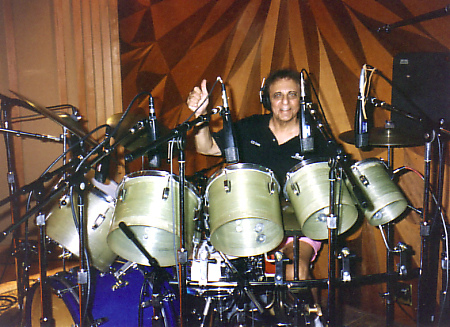
- Blaine recording at the Record Plant in 1995

Background information
- Born: Harold Simon Belsky; February 5, 1929; Holyoke, Massachusetts, U.S.
- Died: March 11, 2019 (aged 90) Palm Desert, California, U.S.
- Genres: Pop; rock and roll
- Instruments: Drums; percussion
- Years active: 1949–2019
- Formerly of: The Wrecking Crew
- Website: halblaine.com

Hal Blaine (born Harold Simon Belsky; February 5, 1929 – March 11, 2019) was an American drummer and session musician, thought to be among the most recorded studio drummers in the music industry, claiming over 35,000 sessions and 6,000 singles. His drumming is featured on 150 US top 10 hits, 40 of which went to number one.

Born in Holyoke, Massachusetts, Blaine moved with his family to California in 1944 and began playing jazz and big band music before taking up rock and roll session work. He became one of the regulars in Phil Spector's de facto house band, which Blaine nicknamed "the Wrecking Crew". Some of the records Blaine played on include the Ronettes' single "Be My Baby" (1963), which contained a drum beat that became widely imitated, as well as works by popular artists such as Frank Sinatra, Elvis Presley, the Beach Boys, Simon & Garfunkel, the Carpenters, Neil Diamond, and the Byrds.

Blaine's workload declined in the 1980s as recording and musical practices changed. In 2000, he was among the inaugural "sidemen" inductees to the Rock and Roll Hall of Fame. In 2007 he was inducted into the Musicians Hall of Fame and Museum as a member of the Wrecking Crew and in 2018 he received a Grammy Lifetime Achievement Award.

== Early life ==
Blaine was born Harold Simon Belsky, one of four children of Meyer and Rose Belsky (née Silverman), who were Eastern European Jewish immigrants, in Holyoke, Massachusetts. When he was seven, his family moved to Hartford, Connecticut. He began playing drums at the age of eight, and got his first drum kit at 13. His father worked at a nightclub and Hal followed him to work, learning drum patterns from the musicians in jazz bands and orchestras.

On July 6, 1944, Blaine was a survivor of the Hartford Circus Fire. He attended the circus primarily to watch the band perform, especially the drummer. When the fire broke out he followed the band escaping under the bottom of the big top’s apron. As ambulances arrived one of the drivers asked Hal to help with a gurney. He ended up assisting victims well into the night.

In 1944, he and his family moved to California.

== Career ==
From 1949 to 1952, Blaine learned drums from Roy Knapp, who had also taught jazz drummer Gene Krupa. He began his professional career playing overnight sessions in Chicago strip clubs, which allowed him to practice and perfect his sight reading skills. He subsequently played as part of Count Basie's big band and toured with Patti Page and Tommy Sands before taking up session work. Unlike many of his jazz contemporaries, Blaine enjoyed playing rock and roll and this meant he played on numerous such sessions during the 1950s. Blaine rarely performed live, with the exception of working with Nancy Sinatra at Caesars Palace in Las Vegas in the 1960s, and with John Denver's band in the 70s.

Blaine was a core member of the Wrecking Crew, the close-knit group of Los Angeles session musicians that played on hit records during the 1960s. Blaine claimed to have invented the name as the "old-school" studio musicians feared these new, younger guys were a "destructive force" in the conservative studio environment of the time. He played with guitarists Glen Campbell and Tommy Tedesco, bassists Carol Kaye and Joe Osborn, and keyboardists Leon Russell and Don Randi.

Blaine drummed for the Ronettes' 1963 single "Be My Baby", produced by Phil Spector at Hollywood's Gold Star Studios, heard as part of the Wall of Sound. The pattern was created when Blaine accidentally hit the snare on just the fourth beat, instead of the two and four. It was a mistake that Spector decided to leave in. Drummer Max Weinberg wrote, "If Hal Blaine had played drums only on ... "Be My Baby", his name would still be uttered with reverence and respect for the power of his big beat."

Blaine played less session work from the 1980s onwards as computers and electronics began to be used in studios, and producers began to bring in younger players. The popularity of the drum machine also reduced demand for session drummers like Blaine. He kept busy recording advertising jingles for a number of years, before semi-retiring from performing. He lost much of his wealth following a divorce. At one point, he was working as a security guard in Arizona.

== Personal life and death ==
Blaine was married six times; he was widowed by the 1968 death of his first wife, with whom he had one daughter. He died of natural causes on March 11, 2019, at age 90 in Palm Desert, California. A statement from his family read "May he rest forever on 2 and 4", referring to the second and fourth beats of a measure in music. Beatles drummer Ringo Starr and Beach Boys leader Brian Wilson expressed public condolences and praised Blaine's musicianship. Ronnie Spector praised Blaine for "the magic he put on all our Ronettes recordings".

== Artistry and legacy ==
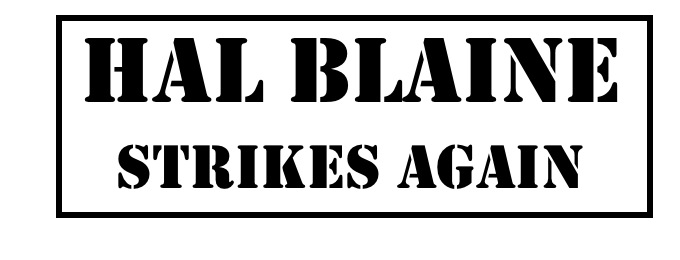
Facsimile of stamp image used by Blaine

"Hal Blaine Strikes Again" was a rubber stamp used by Blaine to mark music scores and places where he played. When asked to explain about the stamp, Blaine said, "I always stamp my charts. And there's a reason why I started that; it wasn't all ego." The stamp was used for any piece of music Blaine played on. Another drummer, Mike Botts, then with the band Bread, recalled: "Every studio I went to in the late sixties, there was a rubber stamp imprint on the wall of the drum booth that said, 'Hal Blaine strikes again.' Hal was getting so many studio dates he actually had a rubber stamp made. He was everywhere!"

Blaine was a prolific session player and by his estimation played on over 35,000 recordings, including 6,000 singles.

Blaine is widely regarded as one of the most in-demand drummers in rock and roll history, having "certainly played on more hit records than any drummer in the rock era". Bruce Gary, drummer for the Knack, once said he was disappointed to find that his 10 favorite drummers turned out to all be Hal Blaine. He is also credited with popularising the "disco beat" after he recorded a "pshh-shup" sound by opening and closing the hi-hat at appropriate intervals on Johnny Rivers' "Poor Side of Town". The effect had been widely used in jazz, but professional recording engineers disliked it because of its resemblance to white noise. The sound subsequently became sought after by producers in the 1970s.

In 2014, Blaine was portrayed by Johnny Sneed in the film Love & Mercy, a biopic of the Beach Boys' Brian Wilson.

The instrumental song "Hal McBlaine" – a portmanteau combining the names of Blaine and guitarist John McBain – by psychedelic garage rock band Wellwater Conspiracy on their 1999 album Brotherhood of Electric: Operational Directives is an homage to Blaine.

== Achievements ==
Blaine played on six consecutive Grammy Award Record of the Year winners:

- Herb Alpert & the Tijuana Brass in 1966 for "A Taste of Honey"
- Frank Sinatra in 1967 for "Strangers in the Night"
- The 5th Dimension in 1968 for "Up, Up and Away"
- Simon & Garfunkel in 1969 for "Mrs. Robinson"
- The 5th Dimension in 1970 for "Aquarius/Let the Sunshine In"
- Simon & Garfunkel in 1971 for "Bridge over Troubled Water"

In March 2000, Blaine was one of the first five sidemen inducted into the Rock and Roll Hall of Fame (one of the other inductees was his long-time friend and drumming colleague Earl Palmer). He was inducted into the Modern Drummer Hall of Fame in 2010. In 2018, he received a Grammy Lifetime Achievement Award.

== Works ==
=== Selected performances ===
- Elvis Presley's '68 Comeback Special, which introduced the world to the power ballad "If I Can Dream", a dramatic tribute to the recently assassinated Dr. Martin Luther King, reaching No. 12 on the Billboard Hot 100.

In addition to playing on 150 US top 10 singles, Blaine played drums on 39 recordings that hit number one on the Billboard Hot 100. The dates given are when each song reached number one:

- "Johnny Angel" – Shelley Fabares, April 7, 1962
- "He's a Rebel" – The Crystals, November 3, 1962
- "Surf City" – Jan and Dean, July 20, 1963
- "I Get Around" – The Beach Boys, July 4, 1964
- "Everybody Loves Somebody" – Dean Martin, August 15, 1964
- "Ringo" – Lorne Greene, December 5, 1964
- "This Diamond Ring" – Gary Lewis & the Playboys, February 20, 1965
- "Help Me, Rhonda" – The Beach Boys, May 29, 1965
- "Mr Tambourine Man" – The Byrds, June 26, 1965
- "I Got You Babe" - Sonny & Cher, August 14, 1965
- "Eve of Destruction" – Barry McGuire, September 25, 1965
- "My Love" – Petula Clark, February 5, 1966
- "Monday, Monday" – The Mamas & the Papas, May 7, 1966
- "Strangers in the Night" – Frank Sinatra, July 2, 1966
- "Poor Side of Town" – Johnny Rivers, November 12, 1966
- "Good Vibrations" – The Beach Boys, December 10, 1966
- "Somethin' Stupid" – Frank & Nancy Sinatra, April 15, 1967
- "The Happening" – The Supremes, May 13, 1967
- "Windy" – The Association, July 1, 1967
- "Mrs. Robinson" – Simon & Garfunkel, June 1, 1968
- "Dizzy" – Tommy Roe, March 15, 1969
- "Aquarius/Let the Sunshine In" – The 5th Dimension, April 12, 1969
- "Love Theme from Romeo and Juliet" – Henry Mancini, June 28, 1969
- "Wedding Bell Blues" – The 5th Dimension, November 8, 1969
- "Bridge Over Troubled Water" – Simon & Garfunkel, February 28, 1970
- "(They Long to Be) Close to You" – The Carpenters, July 25, 1970
- "Cracklin' Rosie" – Neil Diamond, October 10, 1970
- "I Think I Love You" – The Partridge Family, November 21, 1970
- "Indian Reservation" – The Raiders, July 24, 1971
- "Song Sung Blue" – Neil Diamond, July 1, 1972
- "Half Breed" – Cher, October 6, 1973
- "Top of the World" – The Carpenters, December 3, 1973
- "Annie's Song" – John Denver, July 27, 1974
- "Thank God I'm a Country Boy" – John Denver, June 7, 1975
- "Love Will Keep Us Together" – Captain & Tennille, June 21, 1975
- "I'm Sorry"/"Calypso" – John Denver, September 27, 1975
- "Theme from Mahogany (Do You Know Where You're Going To)" – Diana Ross, January 24, 1976

=== Discography ===
- Deuces, T's, Roadsters and Drums (1963)
- Drums! Drums! A Go Go (1966)
- Psychedelic Percussion (1967)
- Have Fun!!! Play Drums!!! (1968)
- Buh-Doom (1998)

== See also ==
- List of recordings of songs Hal Blaine played on
