= King Animal Demos =

EP by Soundgarden
- Released: April 20, 2013
- Recorded: 2012
- Length: 22:26
- Language: English
- Label: Republic Records, Loma Vista
- Producer: Adam Kasper, Soundgarden

Soundgarden EPs chronology
Before the Doors: Live on I-5 Soundcheck (2011)	King Animal Demos (2013)

King Animal Demos is a 10" vinyl EP by the American rock band Soundgarden. It was released on April 20, 2013 through Republic Records. It was released on Record Store Day on a special edition pink vinyl release in the United States, and a standard black edition in Europe.

== Overview ==
The EP is a collection of demos from King Animal. It features six different songs, in their rough mix. The demos were recorded at TNC Studios in Los Angeles and Deke River Studio in Seattle.

== Track listing ==
All tracks written by Chris Cornell, except where noted.

1. "Bones of Birds" – 3:27
2. "By Crooked Steps" (Matt Cameron, Ben Shepherd, Kim Thayil) – 4:24
3. "Halfway There" – 3:34
4. "Worse Dreams" – 3:21
5. "Black Saturday" – 3:17
6. "A Thousand Days Before" (Thayil) – 4:25

== Personnel ==
Soundgarden

- Matt Cameron – drums, percussion
- Chris Cornell – vocals, rhythm guitar
- Ben Shepherd – bass guitar
- Kim Thayil – lead guitar
