= Taree (song) =

Song by Soundgarden

Song by Soundgarden

from the album King Animal
- Released: November 13, 2012
- Recorded: February 2011 – August 2012
- Length: 3:38
- Label: Seven Four Entertainment; Republic Records
- Composer: Ben Shepherd
- Lyricist: Chris Cornell
- Producers: Adam Kasper and Soundgarden

"Taree" is a song by American rock band Soundgarden. Written by bassist Ben Shepherd with lyrics by frontman Chris Cornell, the song appears as the seventh track on the band’s sixth studio album, King Animal (2012).

== Origin and composition ==
Before releasing King Animal, Soundgarden uploaded a string of promotional commentary videos, shot in the Moore Theatre in Seattle, Washington, to its official YouTube account in October and early November 2012. A video involving guitarist Kim Thayil and bassist Ben Shepherd discussing "Taree" was posted online on November 4, 2012, although it had already premiered on MSN two days earlier. In this interview, Shepherd stated that he wrote the music to "Taree" prior to the disbanding of Soundgarden in April 1997:

"I wrote that music before we broke up, before. And I always wanted Chris [Cornell] or us to do it, and I was like, OK, 'cause it had this certain mood. I knew Chris would nail it right away, and he nailed it, and ... he helped to arrange it, so it has more emotion than it used to."

Shepherd added that in the years following the only singers he expected to record in "Taree" were Cornell, Mark Lanegan, or Paul Rodgers. He was preparing to add vocals to a solo demo of the song in 2008, but gave up once it was stolen along with the rest of his equipment. Another demo was done by Shepherd with Soundgarden drummer Matt Cameron while making his solo album In Deep Owl, which decided to show it to the band once King Animal went into production. According to Metro, the song is in 14/4 time. In the past, Kim Thayil has said that Soundgarden usually did not consider the time signature of a song, until after the band had written it, and said that the use of unorthodox meters was "a total accident". Additionally, Thayil uses the wah wah pedal, sometimes cited as being his signature effect, on the track.

== Background and lyrics ==
Shepherd on the background of "Taree":

‘‘I remember moving to Kingston – we lived downtown and [you] look out on the beach and the water and stuff, ’cause it’s a bay, it goes like that. And there was this huge, like, fake Hollywood lettering – 'TAREE' – and it was all totally overgrown.’’

The bassist added that the memories of the neighborhood appeared as he played the "bluesy lick in drop D on my Gretsch Country Gentleman" which evolved into the song riff, as it "reminded me of old photos of my brother and his friend skateboarding in our old neighborhood, Taree. It was a summer cruising kind of feeling. I wanted the choruses to lift up, but the slow part with the feedback—that’s more the mood I wanted for the whole song."

Cornell on its lyrical contents:

‘‘It was my love song to the natural side of the north west [sic] where I grew up…. I never lost that feeling. To me, that’s what Taree’s about.’’

In an audio interview with Matt Pinfield, it was stated that "Taree" had already been given its name, before its lyrics were written. Shepherd said that Taree was an area in Kingston, where he grew up, and that he had previously "worked on [the] song with a lot of different people". Likewise, Cornell elaborated on the song, stating:

"It sort of fit, the title just fit with the music, it just fit too well. I didn’t relieve and try to write something besides that. And then, I just, kind of, made it my sort-of love opus to growing up in the Northwest, geographically. Just my experiences as a kid, you know, it’s like you're – it’s like you could grow up like you’re a gnome in the woods, kind of running around in the trees and climbing trees and swimming in the middle of winter. And that side of it made it a really amazing place, kind of a magical place to grow up in. And the music seemed to sort of support that feeling a lot."

The song has also been named an "ode to nature".

== Release and reception ==
Following its release, the track was generally well received. It was especially praised for its relatively mellow and dejected tone. BBC Music critic Luke Turner said of the song that "Soundgarden have always possessed a real ability to combine darkness with immense grooves, as heard clearly on the sinuous Taree; and it's this that lifted them above their more thrashy, punk rock bar band peers". Rock Cellar Magazine noted that "[Taree's] ominous tones ... demonstrate Soundgarden’s innate ability to quiet down and haunt the listener, things they’ve always done well’’.

United Kingdom-based heavy metal magazine Metal Hammer reviewed it, stating that, "mid-tempo was always Soundgarden's forte" and that "[there are] some great moments here, especially from Matt Cameron who switches from a lazier, behind-the-beat approach to a more direct, punchier groove with the ease of a true professional". The Seattle Post-Intelligencer’s Travis Hay wrote that "King Animal is a record filled with little nuances for your ears to discover and enjoy", such as "the subtle guitar notes accentuating the rhythm section on 'Taree'". Jim Farber of Daily News stated in his review: "They [Soundgarden] stand out even further through their fetish for unresolved chords, a trick that gives many songs a questioning tease. The riff in "Taree" proves so slippery you can ride it. In the tradition of classic Soundgarden songs, like 'Rusty Cage' or 'Outshined', here the guitars snake and slide."

Certain aspects of the song have been the subject of criticism. Reviewing for Time, Consequence of Sound's Matt Melis wrote: "Much of King Animal will satiate even the most skeptical listeners, but the record also slumbers through several cuts that neglect the fact that Soundgarden, even all these years later, is still an animal best kept in a rusty cage. The production on the rallying 'Taree' (among others) removes nearly all the song's rough edges and sandblasts away its grimy surfaces." The Chicago Tribune’s Greg Kot argued that "[for the most part, King Animal] feels a lot like the Chris Cornell show. After wasted years in wayward solo projects and the increasingly linear conservatism of Audioslave, the singer tries to slip back into Soundgarden's heavy-yet-sensual mystique. But he strains for notes he once pierced on the heavier songs, and settles too easily for substandard, low-volume mood pieces, such as 'Taree'." Conversely, Cornell’s vocals were critically lauded as well. David Marchese of Spin said, "Cornell's voice is still a wonder, and he takes full advantage. When, on the ... Sabbath-esque 'Taree', he multi-tracks his vocals — singing harmony in different octaves, inserting rock-god wails deep into the mix, uncorking chest-beating countermelodies — the effect is thrilling."

FasterLouder called it an "odd-timed riff-a-thon", whilst Mary Ouellette of Loudwire labelled the song a "visual soundscape" and Christian Cottingham of Drowned in Sound addressed it as a "Zeppelin stomp", dubbed a highlight on the album. Artistdirect’s Rick Florino pointed out that "'Taree' twists and turns with a dose of Middle Eastern flare". Furthermore, it has been compared to both "Fell on Black Days", off Superunknown (1994), and (partially) to "Rusty Cage", off Badmotorfinger (1991).

== Personnel ==
- Chris Cornell – vocals, rhythm guitar, mandolin
- Kim Thayil – lead guitar, color guitar
- Ben Shepherd – bass guitar, additional guitar
- Matt Cameron – drums, percussion

== Live performances ==
Soundgarden performed "Taree" live for the first time on Later… with Jools Holland, telecast on November 9, 2012, along with "Been Away Too Long" and "Rusty Cage". The band also played the song live on Live on Letterman as part of a ten-song set, recorded at the Ed Sullivan Theater on November 12, 2012.
