= Aya (Japanese singer) =

AYA 亜矢
- Born: Hokkaido, Japan
- Genres: Grunge, Punk rock, Alternative rock
- Occupation: Singer
- Instruments: Vocals, guitar, bass, drums
- Years active: 2001–present
- Labels: Beach Nine Records (2015–present); BMG Funhouse (2002–2006)
- Member of: CruelShe
- Website: https://www.sonymusic.co.jp/artist/Aya/

AYA (亜矢, Aya) is a female Japanese rock artist from Beach Nine Records. AYA's song "Over Night" (2006) is used as the ending theme to the anime Le Chevalier D'Eon. Currently, she is associated with the project band, CruelShe.

== Early life ==
Aya was born in Hokkaido, the northernmost island of Japan, in a small town with a population of 2000. Most of her childhood was spent doodling while listening to her parents' oldies. In elementary school, Aya heard electric guitars for the first time at a Ventures' concert, and in junior high she henceforth devoted herself to hard rock and punk. She joined a girl band right after getting her first electric guitar, doing covers of bands like the Sex Pistols. Bored with school and with few friends, she missed half of the term and dropped out of school at 15.

She was introduced to grunge when she heard Nirvana's 1991 album Nevermind, which would have huge stylistic influence on her own musical career. Leaving home, she wandered around various cities in Hokkaido before ending up in Tokyo. While making a living by singing in bars, she was invited to audition for a band at a pop vocal contest. She won, only to have the band's songwriter die just moments before their debut. She considered giving up on becoming a professional musician, but soon immersed herself in song writing when she discovered it came easily to her. The first song she wrote became her debut song, "Hands". Making demo tracks took up a great part of her time, but she also sharpened her skills by performing on American army bases and the streets of Shibuya. By the time she signed with BMG Japan, she had 30 well-crafted songs ready for production. Aya arranged the songs and used an 8-track multi-tape recorder to create all the various effects and harmonies, playing guitar, bass, and drums (machine) herself.

== The Seattle Recordings ==
American producer Adam Kasper (of Soundgarden and Foo Fighters fame) heard Aya's demo tape and was greatly impressed; he immediately agreed to produce her. In December 2000, Aya traveled to Seattle to record 3 singles at "Studio X", which was well known for its association with '90s grunge bands Pearl Jam, Soundgarden, Alice in Chains and Nirvana. Adam Kasper invited top Seattle musicians to create the "ideal" sound for Aya. Included in this all-star line-up were drummer Matt Cameron (formerly of Soundgarden and currently of Pearl Jam), guitarist Kim Thayil (formerly of Soundgarden), guitarist John McBain (formerly of Monster Magnet), and keyboardist Glenn Slater (formerly of Walkabouts).

In June 2001, they reunited in Seattle to finish the debut album, but this time they were joined by Krist Novoselic, the bass player from Nirvana, whom Aya had long admired.

The album was titled "A Flower in the Battlefield" (Japanese title "Senjyo-No Hana"), and debuted in 2002 to glowing praise in Japanese rock circles and the German press. To promote the album Aya consequently spent the best part of the year concentrating on live performances, doing little press. Soon after her debut she was invited to play at "Summer Sonic Festival," one of Japan's biggest rock festivals, and her wild and aggressive performance was one of the highlights of the 2-day festival. When she opened for grizzled Japanese rocker Eikichi Yazawa's 30th anniversary stadium gigs, she proved she could work a crowd of over 50,000 people with exceptional confidence.

== Independent albums ==
In Spring 2004, Aya decided to release a 7-track EP album, "The Forbidden Song" ("Kinjirareta Uta"), a release that expressed her worldview in a more direct and straightforward manner. Instead of using grunge legends to back her, she decided to record with the three musicians who had been with her on stage since her debut. This was partly to prove that she could do an "Aya" sound by herself, but also stemmed from her discomfort with the idea of using two 'bands' (one for recordings and one for live performances). The result was a tighter album than the first, with a more standard rock feel in general. This mini-album helped Aya secure a more rabid fan base in Japan, and Japanese rock critics hailed the work, stating "Aya reveals her true feelings and intentions with tremendous strength and purity in this landmark album".

Following a sold-out Japanese club tour, Aya went to work on her second full album, "Baghdad Sky" in 2003 and 2004. "BAGHDAD SKY" was the album that Aya had been seeking throughout her career. A "meaty" feel exemplifies the album's harder, more genuine rock tracks ("NOBODY" "1999" "SINGIN' IN THE RAIN" "BETTY" "DEAD END"), while songs like "WE" and "MISS ROCK & ROLL" are essentially pop songs with strong hooks. "SHADOWS ON THE ROAD" and "BAGHDAD SKY" are ballads with a brazen acoustic feel, while "BLUE BUTTERFLY" is an over six-minute epic that showcases the breadth and depth of scale of Aya's talents, with a montage of Metallica and Radiohead set against a majestic soundscape. The album overall has a grander sound than her previous work, and is considered the first to represent her own musical vision.

== 2015: Project band with CruelShe ==
After her long hiatus since 2006, Aya announced her new project band, CruelShe (クルーエルシー), on her Google+ account in April 2015. The band is signed with Beach Nine Records, but no new music releases as of yet. Currently, her YouTube channel contains behind the scenes of her older material, practicing songs, and recent performances at clubs with CruelShe.

== Discography ==
=== Albums ===
- Senjou no Hana (A Flower in the Battlefield) (2002)
- Kinjirareta Uta (The Forbidden Song) (2003)
- Baghdad Sky (2004)

=== Singles ===
- "Hands" (2001)
- "Crazy Mermaid" (2001)
- "Sentaku no Asa" ("The Morning That I Choose My Own Way") (2002)
- "Aya Bitch Project" (2003) – Special Live CD
- "Over Night" (Le Chevalier D'Eon ED) (2006)
