= Taree (disambiguation) =

Taree is a town on the Mid North Coast, New South Wales, Australia

Taree may also refer to:

- City of Greater Taree, a former local government area
- Taree Airport (IATA: TRO, ICAO: YTRE)
- Taree railway station
- "Taree" (song), a 2012 song by American rock band Soundgarden
