= Before the Doors: Live on I-5 Soundcheck =

Before the Doors: Live on I-5

EP by Soundgarden
- Released: November 25, 2011
- Recorded: December 4–7, 1996
- Language: English
- Label: A&M
- Producer: Soundgarden

Soundgarden EPs chronology
| Songs from the Superunknown (1992) | Before the Doors: Live on I-5 (2011) | King Animal Demos (2013) |

Before the Doors: Live on I-5 is a Record Store Day exclusive 10" vinyl EP by the American rock band Soundgarden. It was released on November 25, 2011, through A&M Records.

== Overview ==
The EP is an exclusive Black Friday Record Store Day release. The album is limited to 5000 pieces on clear orange vinyl. The EP contains 5 songs that were recorded during various sound checks on the band's 1996 tour.

== Track listing ==
All songs written by Chris Cornell, except where noted:

1. "No Attention" – 4:27
  - Originally from Down on the Upside.
2. "Never the Machine Forever" (Kim Thayil) – 3:36
  - Originally from Down on the Upside
3. "Waiting for the Sun" (Jim Morrison) – 4:12
4. "Room a Thousand Years Wide" (Matt Cameron, Thayil) – 4:06
  - Originally from Badmotorfinger.
5. "Somewhere" (Ben Shepherd) – 4:21
  - Originally from Badmotorfinger.
- Tracks 1–3 recorded on December 5, 1996, at the Henry J. Kaiser Convention Center in Oakland, California
- Track 4 recorded on December 7, 1996, at the Pacific National Exhibition Forum in Vancouver, British Columbia
- Track 5 recorded on December 4, 1996, at the Memorial Audiotorium in Sacramento, California

== Personnel ==
Soundgarden

- Matt Cameron – drums
- Chris Cornell – lead vocals, rhythm guitar
- Ben Shepherd – bass
- Kim Thayil – lead guitar
