= By Crooked Steps =

Song by Soundgarden

Single by Soundgarden

from the album King Animal
- Released: February 12, 2013
- Genre: Hard rock
- Length: 4:00
- Label: Seven Four Entertainment/Republic Records
- Composers: Matt Cameron, Ben Shepherd, Kim Thayil
- Lyricist: Chris Cornell
- Producer: Adam Kasper

Soundgarden singles chronology
"Been Away Too Long" (2012)	"By Crooked Steps" (2013)	"Halfway There" (2013)

Music video
- "By Crooked Steps" on YouTube

"By Crooked Steps" is a song by American rock band Soundgarden. It is the second single from their album, King Animal. The song premiered on television November 27, 2012, on Jimmy Kimmel Live!. It reached number 1 on the US Mainstream Rock chart.

== Music video ==
The music video for "By Crooked Steps" was directed by Dave Grohl. The video depicts Soundgarden as a motorcycle gang who rides Segways. Midway through the video, the band is shown shutting off an electronic music DJ's laptop, then taking over the stage and playing a show. The DJ proceeds to call the cops, and then the band flees the stage and rides again on the Segways with police in pursuit, ending with the band being arrested. One of the police officers who was arresting the band was played by electronic music artist Deadmau5. Rolling Stone referred to Soundgarden in the video as "badass." Soundgarden drummer Matt Cameron said he felt it was "refreshing" that Dave Grohl decided to make a humorous video for "By Crooked Steps" when it is such a serious song. Cameron went on to say that this was a new experience since Soundgarden had only made "more traditional rock music videos" in the past.

== Personnel ==
- Chris Cornell – vocals, rhythm guitar
- Kim Thayil – lead guitar, color guitar
- Ben Shepherd – bass guitar
- Matt Cameron – drums, percussion

== Charts ==
Chart (2013)	Peak position
Canada Rock (Billboard)	4
US Mainstream Rock (Billboard)	1
US Rock & Alternative Airplay (Billboard)	17
