= Declaration of Conformity =

Declaration of Conformity may refer to:

- Declaration of conformity, a certification mark
- Declaration of Conformity (Wellwater Conspiracy album)
