= Been Away Too Long =

Single by Soundgarden

Single by Soundgarden

from the album King Animal
- Released: September 27, 2012
- Recorded: February 2011 – August 2012
- Genre: Hard rock
- Length: 3:36
- Label: Seven Four Entertainment/Republic Records
- Composers: Chris Cornell; Ben Shepherd
- Lyricist: Chris Cornell
- Producer: Adam Kasper

Soundgarden singles chronology
"Live to Rise" (2012)	"Been Away Too Long" (2012)	"By Crooked Steps" (2013)

Music video
- "Been Away Too Long" on YouTube

"Been Away Too Long" is a song by the American rock band Soundgarden, which is featured on their sixth studio album King Animal (2012) as its opening track. It was released as the album's first single. The song is featured in Sons of Anarchy, NHL 14 and Guitar Hero Live.

== Composition ==
Chris Cornell stated that the title "Been Away Too Long" came to him in as he listened to the radio trying to sleep, as Soundgarden started preparing King Animal. He forgot about it until another insomniac night by the end of production, where he decided to apply it to a song the band had been working on but still had no lyrics. As soon as Cornell started to write them, "it became more autobiographical and it became real." He compared "Been Away Too Long" to Eminem's "Without Me", "which is essentially telling the story of the making of the album and where he feels he exists in pop culture and that kind of thing", stating his song was "more autobiographical and more of a look back at history in sort of a strange atmospheric way, the way that I write. But the initial spark of the idea did feel like it would be right in the narrative of, yes, we've been out, and we've been gone for 15 years, and now we're back. It's about time, and we still have something to say about rock music that no one else is saying and I feel confident about saying that." The music of "Been Away Too Long" started with a demo which Cornell demoed "in a fairly compact form without a bridge", a part later provided by bassist Ben Shepherd. Shepherd, who stated the working title was "EBE" because of the modal guitar tuning - "which is actually EEBB" - stated the bridge intended to contribute "a vast apocalyptic melody", and he even wanted a different bass line before the other members made Shepherd give up on the idea.

== Reception ==
Billboard describes "Been Away Too Long" as being "Built around a heavy snarl of a Kim Thayil riff" that "features frontman Chris Cornell bestowing rock fans with more unbridled energy". Music critic Rick Florino referred to the song as "everything rock 'n' roll fans at large have been waiting for". Amy Sciarreto at Loudwire described the song as "a frenetic, fast-paced song that calls to mind the band's earlier catalog, thanks to raw, booming riffs, jackhammer percussion and Chris Cornell's bluesy, soulful pipes." Sciarreto also praised the song for its lack of polish, calling it "potent, hell yeah, high-five hard rock. Just like we like it."

== Personnel ==
- Chris Cornell – vocals, rhythm guitar
- Kim Thayil – lead guitar, color guitar
- Ben Shepherd – bass guitar
- Matt Cameron – drums, percussion

== Charts ==
=== Weekly charts ===
Weekly chart performance for "Been Away Too Long"
Chart (2012)	Peak position
Canada Hot 100 (Billboard)	93
Canada Rock (Billboard)	1
US Hot Rock & Alternative Songs (Billboard)	17
US Rock & Alternative Airplay (Billboard)	5

=== Year-end charts ===
2012 year-end chart performance for "Been Away Too Long"
Chart (2012)	Position
US Hot Rock Songs (Billboard)	72

2013 year-end chart performance for "Been Away Too Long"
Chart (2013)	Position
US Rock Airplay (Billboard)	28

== Release history ==
Release dates and formats for "Been Away Too Long"
Region	Date	Format
United States	September 28, 2012	Digital download
