= Home on the Strange =

Home on the Strange may refer to:

- "Home on the Strange", part of the Wynonna Earp comic book series
- "Home on the Strange", a song by Geddy Lee from My Favourite Headache
