= The 2nd (album) =

Studio album by Hater
- Released: 2005
- Genres: Alternative rock, grunge
- Length: 35:11
- Label: Burn Burn Burn Records
- Producers: Stuart Hallerman, Adam Casper and Gary King

Hater chronology
Hater (1993)	The 2nd (2005)

Professional ratings
Review scores
Source	Rating
AllMusic	3/5 stars

The 2nd is the second and final studio album by the American rock band Hater, released in 2005. The album was released 12 years after the band's debut, and is made up of songs recorded from 1994 to 1996.

== Production ==
The album was recorded at Avast! Studio in Seattle with Brian Wood, John McBain, and Alan Davis, among others.

== Critical reception ==
AllMusic wrote that "while the Mudhoney/Tad-like guitar rocker 'Between Two Fires' comes off sounding a little too anonymous, the Jimi Hendrix-inspired 'Uncontrolled' is easily the most redeeming moment on The 2nd." PopMatters wrote that "it's not as though it's complete and utter studio wankery (though some of it is) -- there are actual songs to be found in the mush, and some of them even rise a shade above mediocre."

== Track listing ==
1. Try - 3:00
2. Downpour at Mt. Angel - 2:23
3. Curtis Bligh - 2:43
4. Whatsever - 4:12
5. Zombie Hand - 2:35
6. Wish On - 1:51
7. All Good - 3:04
8. Uncontrolled - 3:39
9. Otis & Mike - 2:16
10. Fever Saint - 2:30
11. Alcorokic - 1:32
12. Between Two Fires - 2:01
13. Walk Alone - 3:25

== Personnel ==
- Matt Cameron - vocals, drums, synthesizer
- Ben Shepherd - lead vocals, guitar, piano
- Alan Davis - bass, backing vocals
- Brian Wood - lead vocals on "Downpour at Mt. Angel"
- John McBain - rhythm guitar on "Uncontrolled" and guitar solo on "Fever Saint"
- Gregg Keplinger - lead vocals on "Zombie Hand"
- John Waterman - bass on "Between Two Fires"
- Bill Rieflin - brushes on "Curtis Bligh"
