= Senjou no Hana =

Studio album by Aya
- Released: April 24, 2002
- Recorded: 2001–2002
- Genre: Rock, J-Rock
- Length: 53:30
- Label: BMG Records
- Producer: Adam Kasper

Aya chronology
Senjou no Hana (2002)	Senjou no Hana (2002)	Kinjirareta Uta (2003)

Senjou no Hana (Japanese: 戦場の華) is the debut album by J-Rock artist AYA. It was released by BMG Japan on April 24, 2002. The English title of the album is A Flower in the Battlefield.

Matt Cameron of Soundgarden and Pearl Jam fame plays drums on the album. It also features contributions from several other American musicians: John McBain (bass, 6 tracks), Kim Thayil (guitar, 5 tracks), Glenn Slater (keyboards, 5 tracks) and Nirvana's Krist Novoselic (bass, 1 track).

Some songs are sung entirely in English, some entirely in Japanese, and some a mixture.

The album was produced by Adam Kasper.

== Track listing ==
1. "Prisoner"
2. "HANDS"
3. "Sentaku no Asa" (The Morning I Chose My Way)
4. "Saboten no Uta" (Cactus Song)
5. "May Day"
6. "RABBI DOLL"
7. "ANGERICA"
8. "Jona no Nikki -Home Demo Version-" (Jona's Diary)
9. "KING OF PAIN"
10. "Crazy Mermaid"
11. "Fukai Ai" (Deep Love)

== Singles ==
- HANDS
- Crazy Mermaid
- Sentaku no Asa
