= King Animal =

Studio album by Soundgarden
- Released: November 13, 2012
- Recorded: February 2011 – August 2012
- Studios: Avast! (Seattle); Studio X (Seattle); TNC (Los Angeles)
- Genres: Grunge; alternative metal
- Length: 52:01
- Labels: Universal Republic; Loma Vista; Vertigo
- Producers: Adam Kasper; Soundgarden

Soundgarden chronology
Live on I-5 (2011)	King Animal (2012)	Echo of Miles: Scattered Tracks Across the Path (2014)

Singles from King Animal
- 1. "Been Away Too Long" Released: September 27, 2012; 2. "By Crooked Steps" Released: February 12, 2013; 3. "Halfway There" Released: September 3, 2013

King Animal is the sixth studio album by American rock band Soundgarden, released on November 13, 2012, through Universal Republic and Loma Vista Recordings in North America and Vertigo Records elsewhere. Produced by the band alongside Adam Kasper, King Animal was Soundgarden's first studio album in 16 years, following Down on the Upside (1996), and their final studio album to be released prior to the death of frontman Chris Cornell in 2017 and the dissolution of the band the following year.

== Background and recording ==
In January 2010, the band's vocalist Chris Cornell announced Soundgarden had reunited after dissolving 13 years earlier. At first, the band was primarily interested in relearning their old songs and playing them live, but Cornell declared: "It would be exciting to record one song, to hear how Soundgarden-ish that might be this much time later."

The band's first studio work after the reunion was finishing the song "Black Rain" for the compilation Telephantasm (2010). Guitarist Kim Thayil said the new song "showed our evolvement creatively", and in late 2010 drummer Matt Cameron booked studio time to show some song ideas and have the band compose some more through jam sessions. In February 2011, Soundgarden's homepage announced they had started writing new songs. One month later, recording sessions for a new album began at Seattle's Studio X, with producer Adam Kasper. The sessions were interrupted by the end of the month so Cornell could move onto his solo "Songbook" tour, which would be interspersed with Soundgarden concerts. As the band's contract with A&M Records was fulfilled after releasing Telephantasm and the live album Live on I-5 (2011), Soundgarden produced King Animal independently.

Cameron said in April 2011 how the album would be released later that year, but the recording was prolonged more than anticipated. Thayil said, "the more we enjoy it, the more our fans should end up enjoying it." In October, Cornell said the band would return to the studio in December and the album was "mostly done, we just need to finish a couple of songs and mix it, so that will be happening probably over the holidays."

In May 2012, the band reported they were eyeing a release that October. On September 17, it was announced that the album would be titled King Animal and would be released on November 13, 2012. Cornell said the title relates to how the band "were a big fish in a small pond, and we sort of graduated. There was a sense of us feeling like it was us four against the world. We clearly had that from the very beginning. In some weird way after all this time, we persevered. The album kind of stands out as a symbol and an indication of that."

== Composition and style ==
The band reported that they had 12 to 14 songs that were "kind of ready to go" in March 2011, and the material for the album was "90 percent new". One of the songs that is an updated version of an older idea is "Taree", which bassist Ben Shepherd wrote in the late 1990s. He had recorded a demo of the song for his solo album In Deep Owl (2013) before the band's reunion, but then decided it deserved a full-band treatment.

In June 2011, Thayil said some songs on the album would sound "similar in a sense to Down on the Upside", and the album "pick[s] up where we left off. There are some heavy moments, and there are some fast songs", though the maturation of the musicians during the band's hiatus has also been said to be evident. "Non-State Actor" is mostly in 4/4, but has parts in 5/8 and 7/8. "By Crooked Steps" is in 5/4.

== Artwork ==
The album's cover and subsequent art direction are based on a sculpture titled Night of the Last Equinox by Josh Graham, whom Thayil sought out after seeing the artwork Graham had created for his band A Storm of Light. Featuring animal skulls above a field of flowers in a snowy forest, the sculpture highlights a recurring motif in Graham's art: the juxtaposition of life and death, and how everything in between is a massive part of the human condition. Cornell noted that the artwork was inspired by Graham's interpretation of the songs, feeling it was a suitable fit given the band's frequently moody lyrics with an outdoor theme. Thayil revealed that the band requested art featuring white and lighter colors, as most of their previous album covers utilized a darker palette. Graham also designed the animated backdrops used during the album's promotional tour and directed the music video for the lead single, "Been Away Too Long". The band photographs in the accompanying booklet were taken by their manager, Don VanCleave.

== Promotion and release ==
For the release of King Animal, Soundgarden signed a deal with longtime label executive Tom Whalley's new Loma Vista Recordings, and distribution was handled by Loma Vista's partner Republic Records. Cornell said the experience of only seeking a label once the album was completed was "almost like it was in the beginning of the band." To promote the album, the band recorded a track-by-track narrative at Seattle's Moore Theatre and performed intimate concerts at New York's Irving Plaza, Toronto's Phoenix Concert Theatre, and Los Angeles' Fonda Theatre.

"Been Away Too Long" was released on September 27, 2012, almost seven weeks before the album. Both it and "By Crooked Steps" were used in promotional spots on ESPN for Monday Night Football, and "Been Away Too Long" was used in an episode of Sons of Anarchy. On October 31, 2012, a video for "Non-State Actor" was posted on the official Soundgarden YouTube channel, the visuals consisting of a waving American flag with the King Animal logo in place of the stars. The week before its November 13 release, the whole album could be streamed for free on iTunes. Dave Grohl directed a music video for "By Crooked Steps", which was released on January 29, 2013, and a music video for "Halfway There" was released on September 4.

=== Versions ===
Along with standard CD, double LP, and digital download releases, King Animal was also issued as a deluxe box set that featured the CD with three demos as bonus tracks, the double LP, a DVD of the band's 2012 performance at Hyde Park, and five lithographs. There were several different versions of the CD release, in the United States and internationally, that included various demos as bonus tracks, and for Record Store Day 2013 Soundgarden issued King Animal Demos, a limited edition pink vinyl that collected all six of those demos on a single release. Later in 2013, King Animal Plus was released, which featured five live tracks recorded for Live from the Artists Den at The Wiltern in Los Angeles and an acoustic version of "Halfway There" that Cornell and Shepherd recorded for CIMX-FM in Detroit.

== Critical reception ==
Professional ratings
Aggregate scores
Source	Rating
Metacritic	70/100
Review scores
Source	Rating
AllMusic	4/5 stars
Alternative Press	3.5/5 stars
Entertainment Weekly	B
Drowned in Sound	7/10
The Guardian	4/5 stars
Kerrang!	4/5 stars
Mojo	4/5 stars
The Phoenix	3/4 stars
Pitchfork	5.9/10
Rolling Stone	3.5/5 stars

On Metacritic, the album has a normalized score of 70 out of 100 based on reviews from 32 critics, which indicates it received "generally favorable reviews".

Stephen Thomas Erlewine of AllMusic gave the album a positive review, writing: "King Animal is a big, bright album, executed with precision and professionalism. The band members sound more elderly, not quite as loud, and possess a keener sense of good taste, and it sounds as if they've aged together, which is a testament to their innate chemistry. Simply put, Soundgarden sound like they belong together; Cornell sounds richer, fuller when anchored by drummer Matt Cameron, bassist Ben Shepherd, and the deceptively sinewy and brainy guitarist Kim Thayil, whose presence has sorely been missed over the past decade." Luke Turner of BBC Music was also positive, saying: "King Animal undeniably draws its strength from the band's accessible Superunknown era, but also takes Soundgarden somewhere fresh." Richard Trapunski of Now gave the album four out of five stars and wrote: "King Animal doesn’t sound like a nostalgia-fed cash grab, nor is it poisoned by the desperate commercialism of Cornell's post-Soundgarden projects. Instead, it picks up where 1996's Down on the Upside left off, layering Cornell's distinct howl over psychedelic textures, off-kilter time signatures and heavy, chugging riffs courtesy of way-underrated guitarist Kim Thayil."

Chris DeVille of The A.V. Club gave the album a B− and said: "More often, though, King Animal affirms what a potent formula this band established. It's neither a trainwreck nor a masterpiece, but it stirs the senses in all the right ways." Michael Christopher of The Phoenix gave the album three out of four stars and wrote: "On the whole, King Animal is a welcome return, and though it doesn't reinvent the wheel, it reminds us why these guys were considered the architects of the Seattle scene." Tim Karan of the Alternative Press gave the album three and a half out of five stars and said: "It's difficult to imagine a new Soundgarden album that would sound startlingly different from King Animal. It's right in line with the band's natural progression; so much so that it's almost difficult to believe it didn’t come out a decade ago. Is it as evocative and emotive as their earlier albums? Not quite. But it's new Soundgarden songs that sound like old Soundgarden songs—and if you’re of a certain generation or disposition, that's been a long time coming." Hilary Saunders of Paste gave the album a 7.0 out of 10 and wrote: "Comeback albums are notoriously difficult to conceptualize and actualize and King Animal took more than a year to create after the band spent a decade and a half on hiatus. While this record lacks the canonizing tracks like 'Jesus Christ Pose', 'Black Hole Sun', 'Spoonman' and 'Burden in My Hand', Soundgarden deserves to be commended for recapturing the feeling of grunge and reintroducing it today." Matt Melis of Consequence of Sound gave the album a three stars out of five and said: "Production issues aside, this record proves that Soundgarden still have their muscle but also hints that they are in the process of figuring out how to flex it again. For every realized track like 'Worse Dreams', with its circular vocal phrasings and slippery riffing, there's a jam like 'Eyelid's Mouth' that completely loses its identity — in this case, via an almost painful chorus that asks, 'Who let the river run dry?' Still, there's more than enough merit found in King Animal to ensure that any future tweets by Chris Cornell about new Soundgarden music will confidently be filed under #reallygoodnews."

Scott McLennan of The Boston Globe gave the album a mixed review, writing: "There's nothing bad about these 13 tracks, but nothing truly remarkable either. It's been 16 years since singer Chris Cornell, guitarist Kim Thayil, bassist Ben Shepherd, and drummer Matt Cameron applied their combined talents to new songs, and while the old chemistry sounds intact (though can we get more from the drummer, please?) the material is not particularly combustible." Jonathan Keefe of Slant Magazine gave the album three out of five stars and said: "King Animal doesn't contain any standout tracks that justify Soundgarden's comeback or which rank as essential additions to the band's very strong catalogue. The album is less a triumphant return than an example of what happens to most middle-aged rock bands: They've returned as a slightly more conservative version of what made them famous in the first place." Stuart Berman of Pitchfork Media gave the album a 5.9 out of 10 and wrote: "The best hope for King Animal was that Soundgarden would be inspired enough by their spiritual successors to want to outdo them, and set a new benchmark for ambitious aggression. Instead, the group's first album since 1996 just sounds like the one they would've churned out in 1998."

== Commercial performance ==
In the United States, the album debuted at number 5 on the Billboard 200 chart after selling 83,000 copies during its first week of release. This was the third highest position Soundgarden had achieved on the chart, behind Superunknown (1994), which had reached number 1, and Down on the Upside (1996), which had reached number 2. As of November 2016, King Animal has sold 235,000 copies in the U.S.

Internationally, the album reached the top five of the New Zealand and Danish album charts; the top ten of the Canadian, Australian, Swiss, German, and Finnish charts; the top twenty of the Norwegian, Irish, Italian, and Austrian charts; and the top thirty of the British, Spanish, Dutch, Scottish, and Swedish charts.

== Track listing ==
All lyrics are written by Chris Cornell, except where noted.

No.	Title	Lyrics	Music	Length
1.	"Been Away Too Long"		Cornell; Ben Shepherd	3:36
2.	"Non-State Actor"	Kim Thayil; Cornell	Shepherd	3:57
3.	"By Crooked Steps"		Matt Cameron; Thayil; Shepherd	4:00
4.	"A Thousand Days Before"		Thayil	4:23
5.	"Blood on the Valley Floor"		Thayil	3:48
6.	"Bones of Birds"		Cornell	4:22
7.	"Taree"		Shepherd	3:38
8.	"Attrition"	Shepherd	Shepherd	2:52
9.	"Black Saturday"		Cornell	3:29
10.	"Halfway There"		Cornell	3:16
11.	"Worse Dreams"		Cornell	4:53
12.	"Eyelid's Mouth"		Cameron	4:39
13.	"Rowing"		Shepherd; Cornell	5:08
Total length:				52:01

Deluxe Edition CD, digital download and box set bonus tracks
No.	Title	Music	Length
14.	"Worse Dreams" (Demo)	Cornell	3:20
15.	"Black Saturday" (Demo)	Cornell	3:16
16.	"By Crooked Steps" (Demo)	Cameron; Thayil; Shepherd	4:23
Total length:			63:00

Japanese bonus tracks
No.	Title	Music	Length
14.	"Worse Dreams" (Demo)	Cornell	3:20
15.	"Black Saturday" (Demo)	Cornell	3:16
16.	"By Crooked Steps" (Demo)	Cameron; Thayil; Shepherd	4:23
17.	"Bones of Birds" (Demo)	Cornell	3:27
Total length:			66:27

iTunes Deluxe Edition bonus tracks
No.	Title	Music	Length
14.	"Worse Dreams" (Demo)	Cornell	3:20
15.	"Black Saturday" (Demo)	Cornell	3:16
16.	"By Crooked Steps" (Demo)	Cameron; Thayil; Shepherd	4:23
17.	"Halfway There" (Demo)	Cornell	3:34
Total length:			66:34

Best Buy, Amazon.de, and Australian Deluxe Edition bonus tracks
No.	Title	Music	Length
14.	"Worse Dreams" (Demo)	Cornell	3:20
15.	"Black Saturday" (Demo)	Cornell	3:16
16.	"By Crooked Steps" (Demo)	Cameron; Thayil; Shepherd	4:23
17.	"Bones of Birds" (Demo)	Cornell	3:27
18.	"A Thousand Days Before" (Demo)	Thayil	4:24
Total length:			70:51

King Animal Plus bonus tracks
No.	Title	Music	Length
14.	"Taree" (Live from the Artists Den)	Shepherd	3:48
15.	"Blind Dogs" (Live from the Artists Den)	Thayil	4:24
16.	"Rowing" (Live from the Artists Den)	Shepherd; Cornell	4:25
17.	"Non-State Actor" (Live from the Artists Den)	Shepherd	4:09
18.	"A Thousand Days Before" (Live from the Artists Den)	Thayil	4:46
19.	"Halfway There" (Acoustic from 89X CIMX Detroit/Windsor)	Cornell	3:22
Total length:			77:06

== Personnel ==
Soundgarden

- Chris Cornell – lead vocals, rhythm guitar; piano (6), mandolin (7), producer, additional recording
- Kim Thayil – lead guitar, color guitar; mandolin (4), horn arrangements (4, 9), producer
- Ben Shepherd – bass guitar; additional guitar (7, 8), baritone guitar (8), backing vocals (8), producer
- Matt Cameron – drums, percussion, backing vocals (8), Moog synthesizer (5, 12), producer

Additional musicians

- Adam Kasper – tambura (4), piano (6)
- Jeff McGrath – trumpet (4, 9)
- Greg Powers – tenor and bass trombones (4, 9)
- Brad Stevens – tenor and baritone saxophones (9)
- Bubba Dupree – stun guitar (8)
- Bullet – additional vocals (9)
- Mike McCready – additional guitar (12)

Technical personnel

- Adam Kasper – production, engineering
- Joe Barresi – mixing, additional production
- Nate Yaccino – engineer
- Sam Hofstedt – engineer
- Josh Evans – engineer, studio assistant
- Jay Follette – studio assistant
- Neil Hundt – studio assistant
- Gregg Keplinger – studio assistant
- Jun Murakawa – mixing assistant
- Ted Jensen – mastering
- Josh Graham – album cover sculpture (The Last Equinox), album cover photography and design
- Don VanCleave – band photography

== Charts ==
=== Weekly charts ===
Chart (2012)	Peak position
Australian Albums (ARIA)	6
Austrian Albums (Ö3 Austria)	19
Belgian Albums (Ultratop Flanders)	43
Belgian Albums (Ultratop Wallonia)	46
Canadian Albums (Billboard)	6
Danish Albums (Hitlisten)	5
Dutch Albums (Album Top 100)	24
Finnish Albums (Suomen virallinen lista)	10
French Albums (SNEP)	67
German Albums (Offizielle Top 100)	10
Irish Albums (IRMA)	15
Italian Albums (FIMI)	18
New Zealand Albums (RMNZ)	4
Norwegian Albums (VG-lista)	13
Polish Albums (ZPAV)	36
Scottish Albums (Official Charts)	24
Spanish Albums (Promusicae)	22
Swedish Albums (Sverigetopplistan)	25
Swiss Albums (Schweizer Hitparade)	9
UK Albums (Official Charts)	21
UK Rock & Metal Albums (Official Charts)	2
US Billboard 200	5
US Top Hard Rock Albums (Billboard)	1
US Top Rock Albums (Billboard)	2

=== Year-end charts ===
Chart (2013)	Position
US Billboard 200	149
US Top Rock Albums (Billboard)	35

== See also ==
- King Animal Demos
