= The In-Flight Feature =

Studio album by John McBain
- Released: January 10, 2006
- Genre: Stoner rock
- Length: 46:50
- Label: Duna Records
- Producer: John McBain

The In-Flight Feature is John McBain's debut solo effort released in 2006 on Brant Bjork's label Duna Records. The In-Flight Feature was the result of material accumulated over several years that McBain didn't think was suitable for his then current band the Wellwater Conspiracy. It is mainly instrumental with several songs having no vocals at all and is heavily influenced by 1970s space/progressive rock. Guest appearances include Jon Kleiman and Tim Cronin of Monster Magnet.

A Deluxe Edition of the album was released in 2008 featuring three bonus tracks.

== Track listing ==
1. "The Underwater Pornographer's Assistant" - 5:36
2. "Vimanas Over Nob Hill" - 0:39
3. "In Santiago Airspace" - 10:18
4. "Centaur of the Sun" - 2:33
5. "Motherboard" - 2:23
6. "HubbleBubble" - 3:07
7. "Farewell Iron Age" - 7:36
8. "Vs 666" - 3:32
9. "Metronomicon" - 8:57
10. "Fog Machine" - 2:09

Bonus Tracks

1. "I Got Nightmares" - 2:29
2. "And Now We Are Strange" - 3:34
3. "Motherboard Complete" - 14:03

== Credits ==
- Jon Kleiman - Drums (Tracks 3, 7, 9)
- Tim Cronin - Guitar (Track 3)
- Gerry Amandes - Vocals & Guitar (Tracks 4, 6,11)
- Recorded, Mixed & Mangled by John McBain
