= Hater (album) =

Studio album by Hater
- Released: September 21, 1993
- Genre: Alternative rock, grunge
- Length: 31:03
- Label: A&M
- Producer: Hater

Hater chronology
Hater (1993)	The 2nd (2005)

Professional ratings
Review scores
Source	Rating
AllMusic	3/5 stars
MusicHound Rock: The Essential Album Guide	2/5 stars

Hater is the debut studio album by the American rock band Hater. It was released in 1993 on A&M Records.

The album was reissued on vinyl in 2016 by UME.

== Production ==
The album was recorded live in five days, in a Seattle studio. Most of the material was written by Ben Shepherd, who switched from bass to guitar for the album.

== Critical reception ==
The Stranger called the album "a concise ripper that revitalizes garage rock without descending into kitsch." Trouser Press called it "trivial and self-indulgent, unreleasable were it not for the stature of the participants."

== Track listing ==
Songs composed by Ben Shepherd except where noted:

1. Mona Bone Jakon - 3:09 (Cat Stevens)
2. Who Do I Kill? - 2:37 (John McBain/Shepherd)
3. Tot Finder - 3:06 (McBain/Brian Wood)
4. Lion and Lamb - 2:29 (McBain)
5. Roadside - 2:23 (Shepherd/Wood)
6. Down Undershoe - 4:03
7. Circles - 2:11
8. Putrid - 4:17 (Shepherd/Wood)
9. Blistered - 2:27 (Billy "Edd" Wheeler)
10. Sad McBain - 4:21 (Matthew "Matt" Cameron/McBain)

== Personnel ==
- Matt Cameron - vocals, drums
- John McBain - guitar
- Ben Shepherd - vocals, guitar
- John Waterman - bass
- Brian Wood - vocals
