= The Practice of Joy Before Death =

Studio album by Pond
- Released: 1995
- Genres: Alternative rock; grunge; indie rock
- Label: Sub Pop
- Producers: Pond, Adam Kaspar

Pond chronology
Pond (1993)	The Practice of Joy Before Death (1995)	Rock Collection (1997)

The Practice of Joy Before Death is an album by the American alternative rock band Pond, released in 1995. Its first single was "Glass Sparkles in Their Hair".

== Production ==
The album was produced by Pond and Adam Kaspar. Pond started the album in a basement studio, using an 8-track and recording at different times and with different instruments; Kaspar then remixed some of the songs.

The band filtered its vocals through a megaphone on "Carpenter Ant"; they used a sitar on "Sundial". "Van" is an ode to Pond's mode of transportation during tours.

== Critical reception ==
Professional ratings
Review scores
Source	Rating
AllMusic	4/5 stars
Calgary Herald	B+
Robert Christgau	(2-star Honorable Mention)
Daily Breeze	3/4 stars
The Encyclopedia of Popular Music	3/5 stars
Vancouver Sun	3/4 stars

Trouser Press stated: "Largely repudiating pop, the trio ... head toward the emo-core of bands like Polvo and Sunny Day Real Estate." The Calgary Herald concluded that "few musicians can actually balance raw instinct and fashionable music so beautifully." The Vancouver Sun determined that Pond "churn out a kind of guitar pop that comes from growing up with Pere Ubu, the Pixies and Sonic Youth as songwriting models." Robert Christgau praised "Van" and "Sideroad".

The Washington Post wrote that Pond's "sound is neither pop nor ('Carpenter Ant' aside) metal but swoony low-tech psychedelia; such trippy songs as 'Magnifier' and 'Glass Sparkles in Their Hair' employ droning, circular riffs and the heavily mutated sounds of toy pianos and (apparently) whatever else was lying around." Guitar Player called the album "utterly unpredictable indie-rock chock-full of melodic songs, deep textures, and moods that spirit you away with your balance shaken." The Philadelphia Inquirer opined that Pond "returns to the best elements of its previous effort, while managing to sound more accomplished." The Dallas Observer thought that "the sound is alternately beautiful and harrowing, songs that jangle along their way until they erupt into bizarre bursts of feedback or minor-chord riffs."

AllMusic wrote that "the less-is-more production and incisive songwriting make The Practice of Joy Before Death the best of Pond's three albums." The A.V. Club labeled The Practice of Joy Before Death the band's "masterpiece."

== Track listing ==
1. Sideroad
2. Mubby's Theme
3. Union
4. Magnifier
5. Patience
6. Ol' Blue Hair
7. Sundial
8. Glass Sparkles in Their Hair
9. Van
10. Happy Cow Farm Family
11. Carpenter Ant
12. Artificial Turf
13. Rock Collection
14. Gagged & Bound
