= The Scroll and Its Combinations =

Studio album by Wellwater Conspiracy
- Released: May 22, 2001
- Recorded: 2000 at Space Studio, Seattle, Washington
- Genre: Alternative rock
- Length: 37:03
- Language: English
- Label: TVT

Wellwater Conspiracy chronology
Brotherhood of Electric: Operational Directives (1999)	The Scroll and Its Combinations (2001)	Wellwater Conspiracy (2003)

Professional ratings
Review scores
Source	Rating
Allmusic	4.5/5 stars
Rolling Stone	(favorable)

The Scroll and Its Combinations is the third studio album by the American rock band Wellwater Conspiracy. It was released on May 22, 2001, through TVT Records.

== Overview ==
The album was recorded in 2000 at Space Studio in Seattle, Washington. The album was mixed by the band and Adam Kasper. Pearl Jam vocalist Eddie Vedder (credited as Wes C. Addle) provides vocals on "Felicity's Surprise". Former Soundgarden guitarist Kim Thayil helped with some of the songs on the album. Former Soundgarden bass guitarist Ben Shepherd, who was the former vocalist for Wellwater Conspiracy, played bass guitar on the song "Keppy's Lament". Chris Handyside of Rolling Stone said that "amid all the fuzz and minor chord bombast is an edgy, hard-rock post-millennial tension."

== Track listing ==
No.	Title	Writer(s)	Length
1.	"Tidepool Telegraph"	John McBain, Derek Burns	5:01
2.	"I Got Nightmares"	Q65	2:17
3.	"C, Myself and Eye"	Matt Cameron	4:04
4.	"Tick Tock 3 O'Clock"	Cameron, McBain, Burns, Paul Burback	1:46
5.	"What Becomes of the Clock"	McBain, Gerry Amandes	4:08
6.	"Felicity's Surprise"	Eddie Vedder, McBain	3:42
7.	"Now, Invisibly"	Cameron	2:38
8.	"Of Dreams"	Steve Morgan	3:36
9.	"Brotherhood of Electric"	Cameron, McBain	3:32
10.	"The Scroll"	Cameron, McBain	3:43
11.	"Keppy's Lament"	Cameron	2:36

== Personnel ==
Wellwater Conspiracy

- Matt Cameron – drums, vocals, guitars, keyboards, photography
- John McBain – guitars, bass guitar, drums, keyboards

Additional musicians and production

- Gerry Amandes – vocals on "What Becomes of the Clock"
- Derek Burns – vocals on "Tidepool Telegraph" and "Tick Tock 3 O'Clock"
- Paul Burback – additional vocals on "Tidepool Telegraph" and "Tick Tock 3 O'Clock"
- Amy Denio – saxophone on "Tick Tock 3 O'Clock"
- April Cameron – viola on "Tick Tock 3 O'Clock", "What Becomes of the Clock", and "Felicity's Surprise"
- Justine Foy – cello on "Tick Tock 3 O'Clock", "What Becomes of the Clock", and "Felicity's Surprise"
- Eddie Vedder – vocals on "Felicity's Surprise" (credited as "Wes C. Addle")
- Kim Thayil – additional guitar on "C, Myself and Eye" and "The Scroll"
- Ben Shepherd – bass guitar on "Keppy's Lament"
- Gregg Keplinger – additional drums on "Keppy's Lament"
- Bill Cameron – photography
- Gary Arnett – layout design
- Ed Brooks – mastering
- Adam Kasper, Wellwater Conspiracy – mixing

- Joe Greenwald - Management
- Leonard B. Johnson - A&R Coordination
