= Rock Collection =

Studio album by Pond
- Released: April 8, 1997
- Genre: Alternative rock
- Length: 46:48
- Label: Work Group
- Producer: Adam Kasper

Pond chronology
The Practice of Joy Before Death (1995)	Rock Collection (1997)

Singles from Rock Collection
- 1. "Spokes" Released: 1997

Alternate cover
- Alternate promo edition cover

Rock Collection is the third and final studio album by the Portland-based rock band Pond. It was released in 1997 through Sony Music's Work Group, making it their first and only major label release.

== Musical style ==
At the time, the band described the album as stylistically being a cross between their 1993 self-titled debut and 1995's The Practice of Joy Before Death. Drummer David Triebwasser said in 1997, "I think [it] incorporates a lot of what we did on the first two albums — the songwriting of the first and the experimentation of the second." He added, "it's like you don't want to sit around eating leafy green banana shoots all day, but you can't go bananas on the tire swing all day either."

== Reception ==
Professional ratings
Review scores
Source	Rating
AllMusic	4/5 stars
New Straits Times	3/5 stars

In April 1997, Jeff Vice of the Deseret News considered it to have a different sound to the grunge bands of the Pacific Northwest. He wrote, "now that the grunge rock furor has finally died down, audiences are finally beginning to discover the Pacific Northwest for its 'other' music specialty — fast, loud pop." R.S. Murthi of Malaysian paper the New Straits Times gave the album three out of five stars in November 1997, writing that it "reflects the punkish garage-pop ethos of former label Sub Pop". He added, "the music's in the alt-rock vein and more happenstance than grunge. But there's method in the slackness and that's what makes things like 'You're Not an Astronaut', 'You're Not a Seed', 'Rebury Me' and 'Greyhound' so intriguing. Tunes that start out as crummy chord progressions suddenly make flight in mid-chorus. And what seems like sloppy slide guitar lines add orchestral atmosphere to the music."

AllMusic's Tom Demalon awarded it a four out of five star rating, writing "the lyrics are often tinged with regret, but the sheer force of tracks like 'Spokes', 'Twins', and the gorgeous harmonies on 'One Day in the Future' keep Rock Collection from descending into a depressing morass. Instead, Pond has delivered an album of great power and gloriously loud beauty."

== Track listing ==
Rock Collection track listing
No.	Title	Length
1.	"Spokes"	4:11
2.	"You're Not an Astronaut"	4:36
3.	"Scoliosis"	4:19
4.	"One Day in the Future"	2:35
5.	"Twins"	2:40
6.	"You're Not a Seed"	2:44
7.	"Flawed"	3:07
8.	"My Dog Is an Astronaut, Though"	3:51
9.	"Forget"	3:50
10.	"Golden"	3:07
11.	"Greyhound"	2:11
12.	"Rebury"	2:37
13.	"Filterless"	3:29
14.	"[untitled]" (Also known as "Rabbit")	0:59
15.	"[untitled]" (Also known as "Guitar Opus")	1:03
16.	"Ugly"	2:21
