= Hater (band) =

American musical group

- Origin: Seattle, Washington, U.S.
- Genres: Alternative metal, grunge, hard rock
- Years active: 1993–1997, 2005, 2008
- Labels: A&M, Burn Burn Burn
- Members: Matt Cameron; Ben Shepherd
- Past members: John McBain; John Waterman; Brian Wood; Alan Davis; Andrew Church; Bubba Dupree; Andy Duvall
- Website: haterhater.com

Hater was an American rock supergroup that formed in Seattle, Washington in 1993. The band formed as a side project mostly under the direction of Soundgarden bassist Ben Shepherd. Additional members included Soundgarden drummer Matt Cameron, guitarist John McBain (ex-Monster Magnet and, later, partner of Cameron and Shepherd in Wellwater Conspiracy), bassist John Waterman for the self-titled album, Devilhead vocalist Brian Wood, brother of Mother Love Bone vocalist Andrew Wood, and Alan Davis on bass for The 2nd.

== History ==
=== Formation and first album (1993–94) ===
In 1993, Soundgarden members Ben Shepherd and Matt Cameron formed a side-project band, which they called Hater. They were joined by former Monster Magnet guitarist John McBain. The band's music featured a psychedelic garage rock sound, taking influence from The Stooges. Shepherd sang vocals and played guitar in Hater, in addition to writing several songs on the band's first release, Hater, which was released on September 21, 1993 through A&M Records. AllMusic said, "Those expecting a Soundgarden-esque hard rock album were caught off guard by Hater's penchant for garage rock and classic rock sounds."

=== Side-projects and break up (1995–98) ===
The band contributed a song for the 1995 compilation album, Hempilation: Freedom Is NORML, called "Convicted". The musicians for the track were Shepherd, McBain, bassist Alan Davis, and Cameron. This same lineup recorded a second Hater album in 1995 following Soundgarden's Superunknown tour. The album, however, would be delayed.

During the lengthy hiatus, Shepherd found time to complete the tracks for Hater's second album between his collaborations with Wellwater Conspiracy (another side project with Cameron and McBain), the Mark Lanegan Band, and several other artists. In 1997, after Hater broke up, Shepherd and McBain participated in the first Desert Sessions, a musical project led by Queens of the Stone Age frontman Josh Homme. Cameron joined Pearl Jam in 1998 and would go on to become the band's permanent drummer. Cameron and McBain kept Wellwater Conspiracy going as a permanent side project.

=== Post-breakup activities (2005–present) ===
Hater's second album, called The 2nd, would finally see release on April 26, 2005. It was released through Burn Burn Burn. Allmusic said that the album is "quite comparable to the group's first release" in that it contains "loose n' fun garage rockers." In 2005, Shepherd recruited bassist Andrew Church (Broadcast Oblivion, Droo Church), guitarist Bubba Dupree (Void), and drummer Andy Duvall (Zen Guerrilla) to support The 2nd with a tour following the release of the album. On September 30, 2008, Shepherd and Cameron reunited to perform a Hater show at the Tractor Tavern in Seattle, Washington.

Hater, initially released through A&M Records only on CD and cassette in 1993, was reissued on CD, and for the first time digitally and on vinyl, by UMe in July 2016.

== Members ==
- Matt Cameron – drums, vocals (1993–1997, 2005)
- John McBain – guitar (1993–1997)
- Ben Shepherd – guitar, vocals (1993–1997)
- John Waterman – bass (1993–1995)
- Brian Wood – vocals (1993–1995)
- Alan Davis – bass (1995–1997)
- Andrew Church – bass (2005)
- Bubba Dupree – guitar (2005)
- Andy Duvall – drums (2005)

== Discography ==
=== Studio albums ===
Year	Album details
1993	Hater: Released: September 21, 1993; Label: A&M; Format: CD, cassette (CS)
2005	The 2nd: Released: April 26, 2005; Label: Burn Burn Burn; Format: CD

=== Singles ===
Year	Single	Album
1993	"Who Do I Kill?"	Hater
1993	"Circles"	Hater

=== Other appearances ===
Year	Song	Title	Label
1995	"Convicted"	Hempilation: Freedom Is NORML	Capricorn

== See also ==
- List of alternative rock artists
