= Wellwater Conspiracy (album) =

Studio album by Wellwater Conspiracy
- Released: September 9, 2003
- Recorded: 2002 at Space Studio, Seattle, Washington
- Genre: Alternative rock
- Length: 41:17
- Language: English
- Label: Megaforce
- Producer: Wellwater Conspiracy

Wellwater Conspiracy chronology
The Scroll and Its Combinations (2001)	Wellwater Conspiracy (2003)

Professional ratings
Review scores
Source	Rating
Allmusic	4/5 stars
Rolling Stone	4/5 stars

Wellwater Conspiracy is the fourth and final studio album by the American rock band Wellwater Conspiracy. It was released on September 9, 2003, through Megaforce Records.

== Overview ==
The album was recorded in 2002 at Space Studio in Seattle, Washington. The band members produced the album themselves. The album was mixed by Adam Kasper. The album includes a cover of the Thunderclap Newman song "Something in the Air". David Fricke of Rolling Stone said Wellwater Conspiracy "upgrade the fragrant eccentricity of vintage U.K. flower power—spaced riffing, spiked-afternoon-tea lyrics—with modern muscle." The band performed the song "Wimple Witch" from this album on the Late Show with David Letterman in 2003.

== Track listing ==
All lyrics are written by Matt Cameron, except where noted; all music is composed by John McBain, except where noted.

No.	Title	Lyrics	Music	Length
1.	"Wimple Witch"		McBain, Cameron	2:39
2.	"Galaxy 265"	Gerry Amandes		2:50
3.	"Night Sky"			2:37
4.	"Dragonwyck"			3:20
5.	"Sea Miner"		Cameron, McBain, Glenn Slater	4:36
6.	"Rebirth"		Cameron	4:21
7.	"Something in the Air"	Speedy Keen	Keen	3:57
8.	"Sullen Glacier"			4:27
9.	"Crow Revolt"			3:50
10.	"My Darker Bongo"			3:45
11.	"Dresden Overture"		Slater	4:55

== Personnel ==
Wellwater Conspiracy

- Matt Cameron – drums, vocals, guitars
- John McBain – guitar, bass guitar, keyboards

Additional musicians and production

- Gerry Amandes – quasi-horns on "Galaxy 265"
- Chelsea Chiodo – artwork
- Jack Endino, Kevin Suggs – mixing assistance
- Joe Greenwald – artwork, assistance
- Chris Hanzsek – mastering
- Adam Kasper – mixing
- Gregg Keplinger – bongos on "My Darker Bongo"
- Ted Liljestrand – design
- Sara Roberts – photography
- Glenn Slater – keyboards
- Wellwater Conspiracy – production
- Carolyn White – computer editing
