= Drumgasm =

Studio album by Janet Weiss, Matt Cameron and Zach Hill
- Released: August 27, 2013
- Genre: Instrumental, jazz, improvisation
- Length: 39:43
- Label: Jackpot
- Producer: Larry Crane

Drumgasm is a collaborative album by the drummers Janet Weiss (Sleater-Kinney, Wild Flag), Matt Cameron (Pearl Jam, Soundgarden), and Zach Hill (Hella, Death Grips, Team Sleep). Recorded by Larry Crane, the album was released on August 27, 2013, through Jackpot Records.

== Background ==
Drummer Janet Weiss stated that "friendship and mutual admiration" was the genesis of the project. Prior to the recordings, Weiss proposed renting a studio for a weekend and invited Cameron and Hill, whom she met while touring. The trio recorded around 10 improvisational pieces in varying lengths. The tracks featured on the album, "Drumgasm", was originally one single piece, but were divided into two sides for technical reasons.

== Critical reception ==
Professional ratings
Review scores
Source	Rating
Allmusic	4/5 stars
Consequence of Sound	D−

Allmusic described the album as "a success for a concept that could have just been an exhaustingly showy display of chops on the part of the players," and further stated: "Even in the more self-indulgent moments, it never devolves into anarchy, and much of the album maintains a sense of purpose and delivery." Consequence of Sound critic Steven Arroyo was critical of the album and wrote: "This is the musical equivalent of three people sitting in a room and furiously masturbating on camera for 40 minutes, rarely lending each other a hand."

== Track listing ==
All tracks written by Matt Cameron, Janet Weiss and Zach Hill.

1. "Drumgasm" – 21:16
2. "Drumgasm" – 18:27

== Personnel ==
- Matt Cameron – drums
- Zach Hill – drums
- Janet Weiss – drums
- Larry Crane – recording, production
