= Pond (American band) =

American rock band

- Pond, 1997

Background information
- Origin: Portland, Oregon, U.S.
- Genres: Alternative rock Grunge
- Years active: 1991–1998, 2010
- Labels: Sub Pop; WORK Group
- Past members: Charlie Campbell; Chris Brady; David Triebwasser

Pond was a band from Portland, Oregon. They formed in 1991 and broke up in 1998. They were signed to Sub Pop (first two albums) and the Work Group records sub-label of Sony Records (last album).

On October 23, 2010, Pond reunited for a show to commemorate the closing of Portland club Satyricon.

== Members ==
- Charlie Campbell — guitar, vocals
- Chris Brady — bass, vocals
- David Triebwasser — drums

== Discography ==
=== Albums ===
- Pond (February 12, 1993 - Sub Pop SP186)
  1. "Young Splendor"
  2. "Perfect Four"
  3. "Gone"
  4. "Agatha"
  5. "Tree"
  6. "Wheel"
  7. "Spots"
  8. "Foamy"
  9. "Grinned"
  10. "Filler"
- The Practice of Joy Before Death (1995)
  1. Sideroad
  2. Mubby's Theme
  3. Union
  4. Magnifier
  5. Patience
  6. Ol' Blue Hair
  7. Sundial
  8. Glass Sparkles in Their Hair
  9. Van
  10. Happy Cow Farm Family
  11. Carpenter Ant
  12. Artificial Turf
  13. Rock Collection
  14. Gagged and Bound
- Rock Collection (1997)
  1. "Spokes"
  2. "You're Not an Astronaut"
  3. "Scoliosis"
  4. "One Day in the Future"
  5. "Twins"
  6. "You're Not a Seed"
  7. "Flawed"
  8. "My Dog Is an Astronaut Though"
  9. "Forget"
  10. "Golden"
  11. "Greyhound"
  12. "Rebury Me"
  13. "Filterless"
  14. "Rabbit"
  15. "Guitar Opus"
  16. "Ugly"

=== Singles/EPs ===
- Young Splendor/Tree (B-side is an alternate version from the one that appears on the s/t, Tim/Kerr - 1991)
- Wheel/Cinders (Sub Pop, 1992 - Wheel 7")
- Wheel/Cinders/Snowing (Sub Pop, 1992 - Wheel 12")
- Wheel/Cinders/Ebner (Sub Pop, 1992 - Wheel 12" Import)
- Wheel/Cinders/Snowing/11X17 (Sub Pop, 1992 - Wheel EP)
- Moth/You Don't Quite Get It Do You? (But You're Thinking Hard) (1994 SubPop SP263)
- Glass Sparkles In Their Hair/Sundial (1995 SubPop SP146/366)
- Spokes (1997 - Work)

=== Compilation Appearances ===
- John Peel Sub Pop Sessions - Sub Pop, 1994 (Songs: "You Pretty Thing", "Cinders")
- It's Finally Christmas - Tim/Kerr, 1995 (Song: "Gloria In Excelsis Deo")
- That Virtua Feeling: Sub Pop and Sega Get Together - Sub Pop, 1995 (Song: "Sundial")
