= Ayotte Drums =

Canadian drum manufacturer

Ayotte Drums Inc.
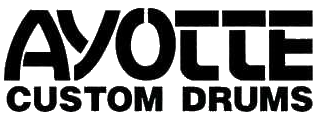
- Company type: Private
- Industry: Musical instruments
- Founded: Vancouver, British Columbia, Canada
- Headquarters: Bedford, Quebec
- Key people: Ray Ayotte, Founder; Jean-Denis Beaudoin, President and CEO
- Products: Drum kits, drum sticks
- Website: www.ayottedrums.com

Ayotte Drums, a former drum manufacturer based in Bedford, Quebec, was founded by Ray Ayotte in 1974 and has been manufacturing drums since 1982. Their drums feature wooden hoops made of Canadian maple. The drums are also known for their Tune-Lock tensioning system, which both protects the drums' tuning and provides a quick-release when changing drum heads.

== History ==
Ayotte Drums was founded by Ray Ayotte, who began his career in the music and percussion business in 1966. Ayotte began selling drums in 1972. Originally, the business was incorporated under the laws of British Columbia on November 28, 1974, under the name "Ray Ayotte's Drums Only! Inc." The Ayotte Drums company was founded as a collaboration between Drums Only! drum store owners Ray Ayotte, his brother George, and Odyssey Guitars' woodworker Attila Balogh, who was in charge of research and development. The company started to manufacture high-quality custom drums in 1983.

On October 27, 1989, at the age of 41, Attila Balogh died in an accident while working late at the Granville workshop. Ray Ayotte was quoted as saying that Attila was "witty, gracious, sympathetic and very very kind, we could not have done what we've done without him". By the time of Balogh's death in 1989, the company employed several craftsmen. In 1993, Ray Ayotte made the decision to forgo drum retailing to concentrate on the manufacturing business. This led to the departure of George Ayotte, and on February 11, 1993, the name was changed to "Ayotte Drums Only Inc."

In November 1994, a group of investors led by Louis Eisman, Bruce Allen, and Sam Feldman invested in Ayotte, taking a controlling interest. The investment was to assist in expansion of the production facilities and implement a worldwide marketing program. In July 1995, Ayotte raised capital through a company formed under the British Columbia Small Business Venture Capital program. The funds were used to expand the factory, purchase new equipment, and hire new staff. The product line was expanded to include drumsticks, and the dealer network was expanded from eleven to over 200 dealers.

Ayotte was joined in 1995 by drum artisan Gregg Keplinger, who helped to publicize and promote the drums — particularly within the burgeoning West Coast music scene, where the grunge movement was on the rise. Ayotte Drums introduced the Keplinger Snare Drum, a 3mm-thick stainless steel shell fitted with wood hoops. Throughout the nineties, the company's success grew until, at the peak of its popularity, most important Canadian drummers played an Ayotte kit.

In 1996, Ayotte drums entered into a relationship with OEM drum manufacturer Tay-e to manufacture proprietary components. The parts included a snare throw-off, bass drum spurs, tom brackets, and tom mounts. Until then, some of the components used came from third party manufacturers such as the RIMS mounting system and Pearl Drums bass drum legs. Before being redesigned and manufactured in Taiwan, the snare throw-offs, which used a rack and pinion mechanism, were machined one by one at the factory in Vancouver.

Ayotte launched their second line of drums, called Drumsmith, in 1997. Drumsmith drums were designed to cater the medium-priced drum market. They had maple shells and lacquer finishes and were mass-produced in Taiwan by Tay-e.

In December 1997, the shareholders of Ayotte Drums Only Inc. tendered their shares under a reverse takeover bid made by ISI Ventures Inc. Ayotte Drums Only Inc. became a wholly owned subsidiary of ISI. The two entities later merged into one corporation, named Ayotte Music Inc., which was listed on the Alberta Stock Exchange under the trading symbol "AYO".

In April 1998, Ayotte Drums opened offices in Nashville to launch and coordinate sales in the United States. Drum industry veteran Ken Austin was hired to head up a team of independent sales representatives operating in the US market. The US division's primary focus was sales, marketing, and artist relations while the head office and custom factory remained in Vancouver.

On August 23, 1999, Ayotte Drums founder Ray Ayotte resigned his positions as President and Director, stating he was unwilling to carry out the direction he was given by the Board regarding the management and direction of Ayotte. Mr. Ayotte then joined Taiwanese drum manufacturer Tay-e to design and establish their own line of drums under the brand "Taye Drums". The drums included maple shell kits and wood hoop snare drums fitted with an "articulated claw hook system" inspired by the quick release system from Ayotte Drums. Mr. Ayotte was also responsible for the sales and distribution of Taye drums in Canada, competing head to head against Ayotte Drums. Between 1999 and 2007, while under the employment of Taye Drums, Ray designed and innovated on a multiple of drum components and hardware parts. In 2007, Taye introduced the Metalworks XP1 bass drum pedal, which was very well received by the trade. The pedal was hailed as one of the most innovative percussion products at the January 2007 NAMM Show held in Anaheim, CA. The relationship between Mr. Ayotte and Taye drums ended abruptly in April 2007 due to conflicts of financial interests and other irreconcilable differences.

In 1999, the Drumsmith line was renamed Pro Maple DS and production was moved from Taiwan to Vancouver.

Ayotte Drums opened an e-commerce website in November 1999. The company announced the site would offer drums, sticks, clothing, hardware, and accessories at 55% below list price. A year later, products from cymbal company Paiste Cymbals and hardware manufacturer Axis Percussion were added to the website. With the retail landscape moving from local drum shops to big box stores coupled with the dot-com bust, the move to e-commerce was controversial. Ultimately, the decision to sell online was perceived from the dealers as a breach of trust, and in reaction to Ayotte Drums selling direct, many dealers decided to stop offering the brand in the stores.

In 2002, Ayotte Drums was sold to Bill Jennison, who operated the business out of Abbotsford, BC. He moved the company to Bedford, Quebec, in 2010. However, after several years of declining activity and growing complaints about customer service, Jennison was unable to maintain production, and the company suffered bankruptcy in 2012. The company was acquired by Jean-Denis Beaudoin. Ray Ayotte rejoined Ayotte Drums in December 2013. After 2 years being retained as an ambassador to the brand, Mr. Ayotte's employment was terminated following the 2015 NAMM convention.

== Drums ==
Ayotte Drums are known for building drums with wooden hoops, as opposed to the metal rims found in most drums. The company states that they use locally grown eastern sugar maple for their drum shells, which are assembled in Bedford, Quebec. The company targets the mid-range and high-end markets. As of 2013, they offered three ranges of drums as well as drumsticks.

=== Custom ===
Made to order, the custom line is considered high quality construction, made from 6-ply maple shells with reinforcement rings and fitted with wood hoops.

- Large Badge (from 1982 to 1996)
- Small squared badge (Serial A: from 1984 to 2012)
- Small squared badge (Serial AA: from 2012 to present)
- Small squared badge (Serial P: from 1989 to 1995)

=== Drumsmith ===
In the late 1990s, Ayotte produced a limited semiprofessional line of maple drums dubbed "Drumsmith", available in a limited selection of colors and sharing the same lugs as their custom line. The most distinctive differences between the Drumsmith line and the custom operation lies with use of triple flange steel hoops as opposed to wood hoops. Also, the bass drum hoops for the Drumsmith line were offered only in a natural lacquer.

- Long badge (from 1998 to 1999)

=== Professional Maple DS ===
At the 1999 summer NAMM Show, the Drumsmith Series was renamed the Professional Maple DS.

- Long badge similar to Drumsmith badge (from 1999 to 2009)

=== Pro-Canada ===
In the early 2000s, Ayotte began producing their most often-requested sizes and finishes in the custom line in advance, rather than wait for a specific customer order. The Pro-Canada line of drums were manufactured in limited colors and sizes to reduced turnaround time. Made in the same facility, by the same craftsmen, with the same materials and machinery, the Pro-Canada line was simply an expedited form of their custom line.

- Small squared badge similar to custom badge (from 2002 to 2008)

=== Velvet ===
In the latter half of the 2000s, Ayotte began offering a new small-scale line of drums, the Velvet series. Offered in limited colors and sizes, the Velvet is made from 8-ply maple shells and is fitted with wood hoops.

- Small squared badge (from 2005 to present)

=== Bedford ===
Similar to the Velvet, the Bedford line is offered in limited configuration but is fitted with steel hoops. This line is offered as a low-cost alternative.

- Small squared badge (from 2010 to present)

=== New Era ===
Introduced at the 2015 NAMM Show, the New Era line is offered in limited configuration and colors.

- Long see-through-logo badge (introduced in 2015)
