= My Favourite Headache =

Studio album by Geddy Lee
- Released: November 14, 2000
- Recorded: April 2000
- Studio: The Peasant's Tent and Reaction Studios, Toronto, East and West and The Factory Studios, Vancouver, British Columbia, Studio X, Seattle, Washington, Metalworks Studios in Mississauga, Ontario
- Genre: Alternative rock; hard rock
- Length: 48:06
- Label: Anthem, Atlantic
- Producer: Geddy Lee; Ben Mink; David Leonard

Geddy Lee chronology
| My Favourite Headache (2000) | The Lost Demos (2023) |

Singles from My Favourite Headache
- 1. "My Favourite Headache" Released: November 2000; 2. "Grace to Grace" Released: February 2001; 3. "Home on the Strange" Released: 2001

My Favourite Headache (also published as My Favorite Headache, especially in the United States) is the debut solo album by Geddy Lee of Canadian rock band Rush. The album was released on November 14, 2000, by Anthem Records in Canada and Atlantic Records outside of Canada. Both the title track and "Grace to Grace" received play on mainstream rock radio.

== Background ==
Although Lee wrote the majority of the album on bass, he was not just writing melody lines; he was also playing chords. In some cases, he multi-tracked basses into different layers of the arrangements.

Lee said of the album: "I think I backed into this project. I've never had a great desire to make an individual statement, and I certainly didn't want any more attention. I satisfy so much of my musical self in the context of Rush, so I don't have any great frustrations from that point of view. But once in a while, you'd wonder, 'What's it like out there? What's it like to work with other people?'".

Lee explaining how he wrote the lyrics for My Favourite Headache: "Most people are like this: They think of stuff during the day. The mind goes to certain places, they remember things, and they try to figure things out. To remind yourself to write that stuff down is a great benefit. Then you come back to it and you analyze it days later, and lyrically shape what you felt when you wrote it down. For me, how I feel about what I wrote down turns into a song."

Professional ratings
Aggregate scores
| Source | Rating |
|---|---|
| Metacritic | 58/100 |
Review scores
| Source | Rating |
| AllMusic | 3/5 stars |
| Classic Rock | 3.5/5 stars |
| The Daily Vault | A |
| The Essential Rock Discography | 5/10 |

== Commercial performance ==
My Favourite Headache peaked at No. 52 on the Billboard 200. The album also reached No. 10 on Canada's Metal Albums chart.

== Track listing ==
All lyrics by Geddy Lee, all music by Lee and Ben Mink.

| No. | Title | Length |
|---|---|---|
| 1. | "My Favourite Headache" | 4:45 |
| 2. | "The Present Tense" | 3:25 |
| 3. | "Window to the World" | 3:02 |
| 4. | "Working at Perfekt" | 5:00 |
| 5. | "Runaway Train" | 4:30 |
| 6. | "The Angels' Share" | 4:33 |
| 7. | "Moving to Bohemia" | 4:25 |
| 8. | "Home on the Strange" | 3:46 |
| 9. | "Slipping" | 5:06 |
| 10. | "Still" | 4:30 |
| 11. | "Grace to Grace" | 4:59 |

== Personnel ==
Personnel per booklet.

=== Musicians ===
- Geddy Lee - bass guitar, vocals, guitar, piano, programming, percussion, string arrangements, producer, engineer
- Ben Mink - guitars, violins and violas, programming, string arrangements, producer, engineer
- Matt Cameron - drums
- Jeremy Taggart - drums on "Home on the Strange"
- John Friesen - cellos on "Working at Perfekt"
- Ed Wilson - additional programming
- Chris Stringer - additional percussion
- Waylon Wall - steel guitar on "Window to the World"
- Pappy Rosen - backing vocals on "Slipping"

=== Production ===
- David Leonard - producer, engineer, mixing at Metalworks Studios
- Adam Kasper, Dennis Tougas - engineers
- Sam Hofstedt, Sheldon Zaharko, Chris Stringer, Tom Heron, Jeff Elliot, Joel Kazmi, Ian Bodzasi - assistant engineers
- Daniel Séguin - computer technical assistance
- Howie Weinberg - mastering at Masterdisk, New York
