= Brotherhood of Electric: Operational Directives =

Studio album by Wellwater Conspiracy
- Released: February 9, 1999
- Recorded: 1998
- Genre: Alternative rock
- Length: 50:03
- Language: English
- Label: Time Bomb
- Producer: Adam Kasper, Wellwater Conspiracy

Wellwater Conspiracy chronology
Declaration of Conformity (1997)	Brotherhood of Electric: Operational Directives (1999)	The Scroll and Its Combinations (2001)

Professional ratings
Review scores
Source	Rating
Allmusic	4/5 stars

Brotherhood of Electric: Operational Directives is the second studio album by the American rock band Wellwater Conspiracy. It was released on February 9, 1999, through Time Bomb Recordings.

== Overview ==
The album was recorded in 1998. The band worked with the producer Adam Kasper. The album was mixed by the band members themselves. This is the first Wellwater Conspiracy album to include Matt Cameron on lead vocals. The album has a guest appearance by rock musician Josh Homme of Queens of the Stone Age and Kyuss. The album's cover art was created by Cameron. Greg Prato of Allmusic said Wellwater Conspiracy "offer another intriguing collection of 60's-tinged ditties." Teen Lambchop was played live at the first Queens of the Stone Age concert which McBain and Cameron were members of at the time.

== Track listing ==
All tracks are written by John McBain and Matt Cameron, except where noted.

No.	Title	Writer(s)	Length
1.	"Destination 24"		0:50
2.	"Compellor"		3:21
3.	"Teen Lambchop"		3:16
4.	"Hal McBlaine"		3:45
5.	"Born With a Tail"		5:49
6.	"Destination 7"		0:32
7.	"Red Light Green Light"		2:59
8.	"B.O.U."	McBain, Cameron, Luke St. Kimble	3:41
9.	"Psycho Scrimm"		2:06
10.	"Van Vanishing"	Cameron	4:55
11.	"Right of Left Field"		3:43
12.	"Ladder to the Moon"		3:23
13.	"Dark Passage"		1:16
14.	"Good Pushin'"		2:38
15.	"Dr. Browne Dr. Greene"		5:07
16.	"Jefferson Experiment"		2:42
17.	"6-6-5-4-3-2-1*"
18.	"Son Of Right Of Left Field*"

== Personnel ==
Wellwater Conspiracy

- Matt Cameron – drums, vocals, guitars, bass guitar, keyboards, artwork
- John McBain – guitars, bass guitar, keyboards, screams

Additional musicians and production

- April Cameron – viola on "Hal McBlaine", "B.O.U.", and "Dr. Browne Dr. Greene"
- Justine Foy – cello on "Hal McBlaine", "B.O.U.", and "Dr. Browne Dr. Greene"
- Rebecca Keith – violin on "Hal McBlaine", "B.O.U.", and "Dr. Browne Dr. Greene"
- Luke St. Kimble – vocals on "B.O.U."
- Gerry Amandes – bass guitar on "Hal McBlaine", keyboards on "Jefferson Experiment"
- Glenn Slater – keyboards, synthesizer, piano on "Hal McBlaine", "Born With a Tail", "Red Light, Green Light", "B.O.U." and "Jefferson Experiment"
- Josh Homme – vocals on "Teen Lambchop", "Red Light, Green Light", and "Ladder to the Moon", bass guitar on "Ladder to the Moon" and "Good Pushin'"
- John Golden – mastering
- John Burton – mixing assistance
- Adam Kasper – production
- Wellwater Conspiracy – production, mixing
