= Adam Kasper =

American record producer and engineer

- Occupations: Record producer; engineer
- Awards: Grammy Award, Best Rock Album, 2001; Grammy Award, Best Rock Album, 2004 (Foo Fighters, One by One); Grammy Award, Best Instrumental Album, 2006 (Peter Frampton, Fingerprints); Golden Globe, 2008 (Eddie Vedder, Into the Wild)

Adam Kasper is an American record producer and engineer, with platinum and gold awards, working with such bands as Aerosmith, Mudhoney, Nirvana, Foo Fighters, Queens of the Stone Age, The Tragically Hip, R.E.M., Soundgarden and Pearl Jam. He went to Capital High School in Olympia, Washington.

He won a Grammy Award in 2001 for his work on the Foo Fighters' There Is Nothing Left to Lose (see Grammy Awards of 2001), and again in 2004 for his work on the Foo Fighters' One by One.

== Albums produced ==
- Truly - Fast Stories... from Kid Coma (1995)
- Seaweed - Spanaway (1995)
- Soundgarden - Down on the Upside (1996)
- Pond - Rock Collection (1997)
- The Watchmen - Silent Radar (1998)
- Wellwater Conspiracy - Brotherhood of Electric: Operational Directives (1999)
- Foo Fighters - There Is Nothing Left to Lose (1999)
- Cold - 13 Ways to Bleed on Stage (2000)
- Foo Fighters - One by One (2002)
- Queens of the Stone Age - Songs for the Deaf (2002)
- Pearl Jam - Riot Act (2002)
- Aya - "Senjou no Hana" (2002)
- The Tragically Hip - In Between Evolution (2004)
- Pearl Jam - Pearl Jam (2006)
- Eddie Vedder - Into the Wild (2007)
- Soundgarden - Live on I-5 (2011)
- Eddie Vedder - Ukulele Songs (2011)
- Spoonshine - Song of the Sockeye (2012)
- Soundgarden - King Animal (2012)
- Ume - Monuments (2014)
- Pop Evil - Up (2015)

== Albums mixed ==
- messerschmitt - gummo ain’t for nothing (2021)
- Truly - Fast Stories... from Kid Coma (1995)
- Soundgarden - Down on the Upside (1996)
- Sunny Day Real Estate - How It Feels To Be Something On (1998)
- Foo Fighters - There Is Nothing Left to Lose (1999) (except 3, 6, 7)
- Spys4Darwin - microfish (2001)
- Wellwater Conspiracy - The Scroll and Its Combinations (2001)
- Queens of the Stone Age - Songs for the Deaf (2002)
- Cat Power - You Are Free (2003)
- Queensrÿche - Tribe (2003)
- Wellwater Conspiracy - Wellwater Conspiracy (2003)
- Jack Irons - Attention Dimension (2004)
- Queensrÿche - The Art of Live (2004)
- Visqueen - Sunset on Dateland (2004)
- Pearl Jam - Pearl Jam (2006)
- Eddie Vedder - Into the Wild (2007)
- The Elms - The Great American Midrange (2009)
- Soundgarden - Live on I-5 (2011)
- Mark Blacknell - Mystery City Pretenders (2017) (3, 5, 10)
- The Jins - It's a Life (2023)

== Songs produced ==
- Nirvana - "You Know You're Right" (2002)
- Pearl Jam - "Man of the Hour" (2003)
