= Declaration of Conformity (Wellwater Conspiracy album) =

- Artwork for the CD edition

Studio album by Wellwater Conspiracy
- Released: 1997
- Recorded: 1996–1997
- Genre: Alternative rock
- Length: 41:51
- Language: English
- Label: Third Gear

Wellwater Conspiracy chronology
Declaration of Conformity (1997)	Brotherhood of Electric: Operational Directives (1999)

Vinyl LP
- Artwork for the 1997 vinyl edition

2023 reissue

Professional ratings
Review scores
Source	Rating
AllMusic	3/5 stars
Rolling Stone	3/5 stars
Uncut	3/5 stars

Declaration of Conformity is the first studio album by the American rock band Wellwater Conspiracy. It was released in 1997 through Third Gear Records.

== Overview ==
The album was recorded in 1996 and 1997. This is the only Wellwater Conspiracy album in which Ben Shepherd sings all of the songs. The album was released to general critical acclaim. Matt Diehl of Rolling Stone said, "Declaration of Conformity suggests that these Soundgarden expats have left the Seattle sound behind for trippy psychedelia that recalls such 1960s freak icons as Syd Barrett and 13th Floor Elevators. Declaration's tinny, fuzzed-out sonics decidedly evoke the Summer of Love."

== Track listing ==
No.	Title	Writer(s)	Length
1.	"Sleeveless"	John McBain, Ben Shepherd	3:17
2.	"Shel Talmy"	McBain, Matt Cameron, Shepherd	3:00
3.	"The Ending"	McBain, Cameron, Shepherd	2:59
4.	"Sandy"	The Carnabeats	2:32
5.	"Far Side of Your Moon"	McBain, Cameron, Shepherd	2:56
6.	"Lucy Leave"	Syd Barrett	3:04
7.	"Green Undertow"	McBain, Cameron	2:49
8.	"Enebrio"	McBain	3:03
9.	"You Do You"	McBain, Shepherd	3:03
10.	"Space Travel in the Blink of an Eye"	McBain, Cameron, Shepherd	3:14
11.	"Nati Bati Yi"	The Spiders	2:31
12.	"Declaration of Conformity"	McBain, Cameron, Shepherd	3:19
13.	"Trowerchord"	McBain, Shepherd	3:24
14.	"Palomar Observatory"	McBain, Cameron, Shepherd	2:40

Japanese bonus tracks

No.	Title	Writer(s)	Length
15.	"Acka Raga"	John Mayer
16.	"Late Night"	Barrett

== Personnel ==
Wellwater Conspiracy

- Matt Cameron – drums, vocals, mini-moog, simulated rain, acoustic guitar, guitar solo on "Lucy Leave"
- John McBain – guitars, bass guitar, drums on "Far Side of Your Moon" and "Palomar Observatory"
- Ben Shepherd – vocals

Additional musicians

- Lou Alexander – bass assistance on "Shel Talmy"
