= John McBain (musician) =

American guitarist

- Born: April 23, 1965 (age 60); New Jersey, United States
- Genres: Rock; space rock; stoner rock; psychedelic rock
- Occupations: Musician; record producer
- Instrument: Guitar
- Years active: 1989–present

John McBain (born April 23, 1965) is an American musician from New Jersey. He was a guitarist for the rock bands Monster Magnet, Hater, and Wellwater Conspiracy, among others. He is also active as a solo artist and has contributed to The Desert Sessions.

== Career ==
=== Hater ===
After leaving Monster Magnet, McBain moved to Washington State to create the garage rock group Hater, along with Matt Cameron (Soundgarden, Pearl Jam), Ben Shepherd (Soundgarden) and Brian Wood (brother of Mother Love Bone vocalist Andrew Wood). The band released two albums of their brand of garage/psychedelic rock: their self-titled debut in 1993 and their follow-up, The 2nd, which was recorded in 1995 but released in 2005.

In 1997, after Hater broke up, McBain participated in the first Desert Sessions, a musical project led by Queens of the Stone Age frontman Josh Homme. There he befriended ex-Kyuss/Fu Manchu drummer Brant Bjork.

He was a live member of the Queens of the Stone Age for their first three shows, and co-wrote the song "Regular John" which appears on their self-titled debut album.

=== Wellwater Conspiracy ===
In 1993, McBain and Matt Cameron created the Wellwater Conspiracy along with Ben Shepherd. After several 7" singles they released their debut album Declaration of Conformity in 1997 on the Third Gear label. Shortly after the release, Cameron was chosen to replace Jack Irons as drummer for rock group Pearl Jam. However, Cameron maintained both groups, contributing to a further three Wellwater Conspiracy albums. Notable appearances include keyboardist Glenn Slater of folk rock group The Walkabouts, Eddie Vedder of Pearl Jam and Josh Homme of Queens of the Stone Age and Kyuss.

=== Solo career ===
In 2004, McBain moved to San Francisco, refining material that he had accumulated which he believed was not in step with the Wellwater Conspiracy's garage rock style. In February 2006 he released The In-Flight Feature on Duna Records (founded by Brant Bjork). In 2012 McBain collaborated with Carlton Melton on their Smoke Drip 12 inch LP

== Discography ==
Monster Magnet

- Monster Magnet – 1990 (EP)
- Tab – 1991 (EP)
- Spine of God – 1991

Hater

- Hater – 1993
- The 2nd – 2005

Devilhead

- Pest Control – 1996

Wellwater Conspiracy

- Declaration of Conformity – 1997
- Brotherhood of Electric: Operational Directives – 1999
- The Scroll and Its Combinations – 2001
- Wellwater Conspiracy – 2003

Solo work

- The In-Flight Feature – 2006
- Accidental Soundtracks Vol. 1: The Alpha Particle – 2017

Other contributions

- Desert Sessions Vol 1 & 2 – 1998
- Desert Sessions Vol 3 & 4 – 1998
- The Freeks – The Freeks – 2008
- Carlton Melton – Smoke Drip – 2012
- Kandodo/McBain - Lost Chants/Last Chance - 2016
