= Wellwater Conspiracy =

American rock band (1993–2004)

- Origin: Seattle, Washington, U.S.
- Genres: Alternative rock; garage rock; neo-psychedelia; space rock
- Years active: 1993–2004
- Labels: Third Gear; Time Bomb; TVT; Megaforce
- Past members: Matt Cameron; John McBain; Ben Shepherd; Josh Homme
- Website: nowinvisibly.com/wwc/

Wellwater Conspiracy was an American rock band that formed in Seattle, Washington in 1993. The band was created by members of the grunge-era side project Hater. Wellwater Conspiracy featured Soundgarden drummer Matt Cameron and ex-Monster Magnet guitarist John McBain. The band originally featured Soundgarden bassist Ben Shepherd, who left the band in 1998. Various other artists have contributed to the band's albums, notably Queens of the Stone Age front man Josh Homme, Pearl Jam singer Eddie Vedder, and Soundgarden guitarist Kim Thayil.

== History ==
Wellwater Conspiracy was formed in 1993 by Matt Cameron, Ben Shepherd, and John McBain. All three were also members of the band Hater at the time. Wellwater Conspiracy's first recording sessions took place in the basement of Cameron's house. The band released three singles in the mid-1990s. The group released its debut album, Declaration of Conformity, on June 17, 1997 through Third Gear Records to general critical acclaim. Matt Diehl of Rolling Stone said, "Declaration of Conformity suggests that these Soundgarden expats have left the Seattle sound behind for trippy psychedelia that recalls such '60s freak icons as Syd Barrett and 13th Floor Elevators."

Shortly after the release of the band's debut album, Shepherd left the band, and Cameron was chosen to replace Jack Irons as the drummer for the rock group Pearl Jam. However, Cameron and McBain were intent on keeping the band going as a permanent side project, and with Cameron taking over lead vocal duties, the band released three more Wellwater Conspiracy albums following its debut album. The band's second album, Brotherhood of Electric: Operational Directives, was released on February 9, 1999 through Time Bomb Recordings. Greg Prato of AllMusic said Wellwater Conspiracy "offer another intriguing collection of 60's-tinged ditties."

On May 22, 2001, Wellwater Conspiracy released its third album, The Scroll and Its Combinations, through TVT Records. Chris Handyside of Rolling Stone said that "amid all the fuzz and minor chord bombast is an edgy, hard-rock post-millenial [sic] tension." On September 9, 2003, the band released the self-titled Wellwater Conspiracy through Megaforce Records. David Fricke of Rolling Stone said Wellwater Conspiracy "upgrade the fragrant eccentricity of vintage U.K. flower power—spaced riffing, spiked-afternoon-tea lyrics—with modern muscle."

The band's music featured a psychedelic garage rock sound. The band often performed with other musicians, many of whom were friends of the band. Notable appearances included keyboardist Glenn Slater of folk rock group The Walkabouts, guitarist Kim Thayil of Soundgarden, vocalist Eddie Vedder of Pearl Jam, and vocalist/guitarist Josh Homme of Queens of the Stone Age and Kyuss.

== Members ==
- Matt Cameron – Vocals, Drums (1993–2004)
- John McBain – Guitar
- Ben Shepherd – Vocals (1993–1998)

== Discography ==
=== Studio albums ===
Title	Album details
Declaration of Conformity	Released: June 17, 1997; Label: Third Gear; Format: CD, LP
Brotherhood of Electric: Operational Directives	Released: February 9, 1999; Label: Time Bomb; Format: CD, LP
The Scroll and Its Combinations	Released: May 22, 2001; Label: TVT; Format: CD
Wellwater Conspiracy	Released: September 9, 2003; Label: Megaforce; Format: CD, LP

=== Singles ===
Year	Single	Album
1993	"Sleeveless"	Declaration of Conformity
1993	"Sandy"/"Nata Bati Yi"	Declaration of Conformity
1994	"Trowerchord"	Declaration of Conformity
1997	"Compellor"	Brotherhood of Electric: Operational Directives
2000	"Tidepool Telegraph"	The Scroll and Its Combinations
2001	"Of Dreams"	The Scroll and Its Combinations

=== Other appearances ===
Year	Song	Title	Label
1995	"Far Side of Your Moon"	Succour: The Terrascope Benefit Album	Flydaddy

== See also ==
- List of alternative rock artists
