= Gregg Keplinger =

American drummer

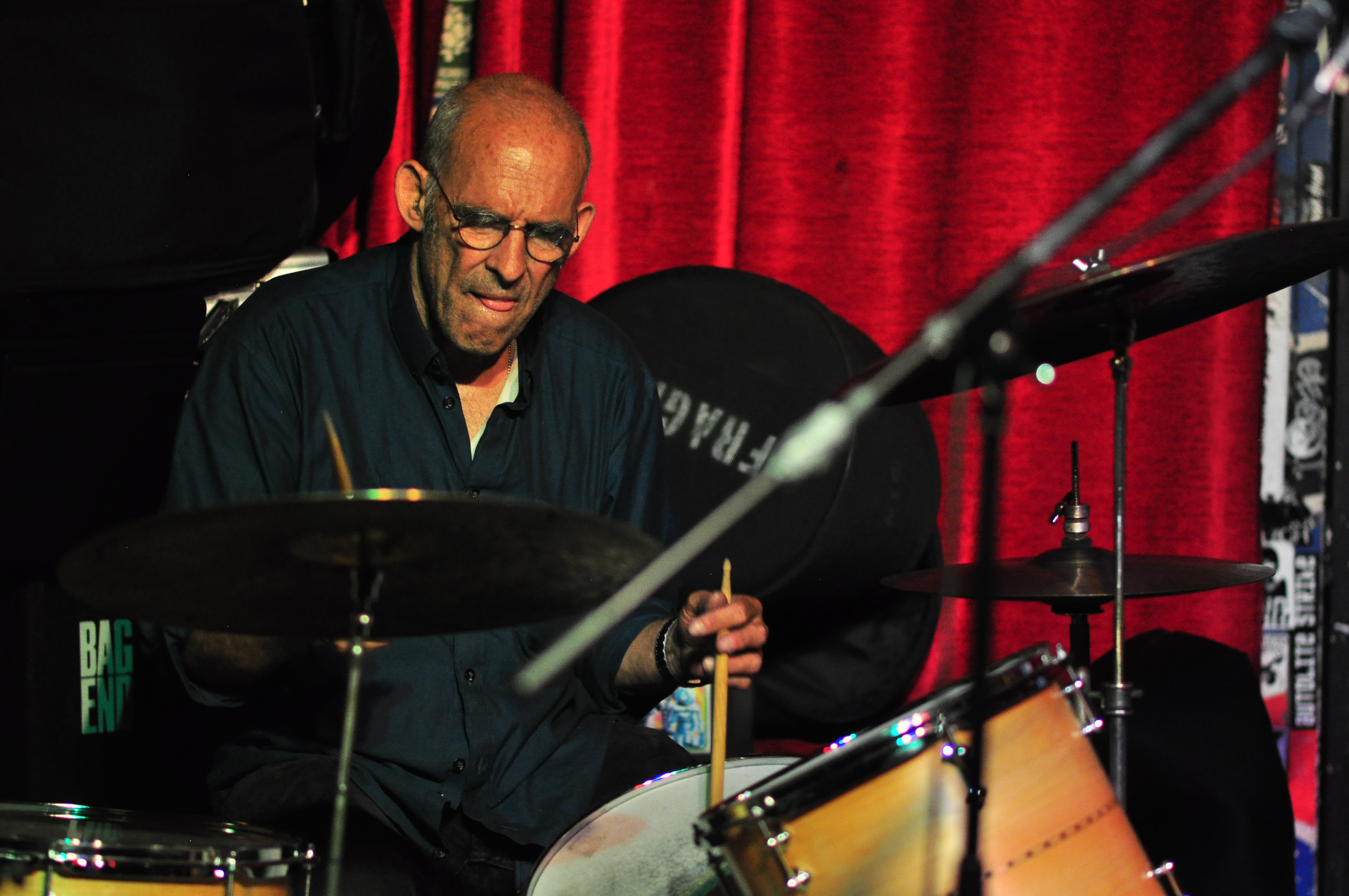
Gregg Keplinger

Gregg Keplinger is an American drummer, drum maker, and drum tech from Seattle, Washington.

== As a drummer ==
Keplinger began playing the drums at the age of 14, and has played in a large variety of bands ranging across many different styles, from Jazz to New Wave to R&B.

== Drum making ==
Keplinger began making drums in the 1980's during a break in his own musical activity. During the 90's he teamed with Ayotte Drums to produce his snares, though he now produces them by himself again. Gregg handcrafts snare drums, cymbals, and percussion out of a variety of metals, mainly stainless steel. His drums have been used by the likes of Elvin Jones, Matt Cameron, Dave Grohl, Jeremy Taggart, and Zach Hill. Keplinger is best known for his stainless steel drums, which are often noted for their explosive sound as well as heavy weight and shell thickness (3mm).

== Drum teching ==
Gregg has toured the world as a drum tech for Matt Cameron with Soundgarden and Pearl Jam, Our Lady Peace, and Sunny Day Real Estate among others. He also served as a drum tech in the recording studio on Soundgarden's breakthrough album Superunknown. Matt Cameron stated in the June 1994 issue of Modern Drummer magazine that "Gregg (Keplinger) was in the studio this time to help me out with things, changing heads and putting up cymbals. But one of the biggest things to me was that he would play the drums while I went into the control room and helped dial in the sounds. That saved a lot of time and kept me fresh when it was time to do a take."
