= Matt Cameron =

American drummer (born 1962)

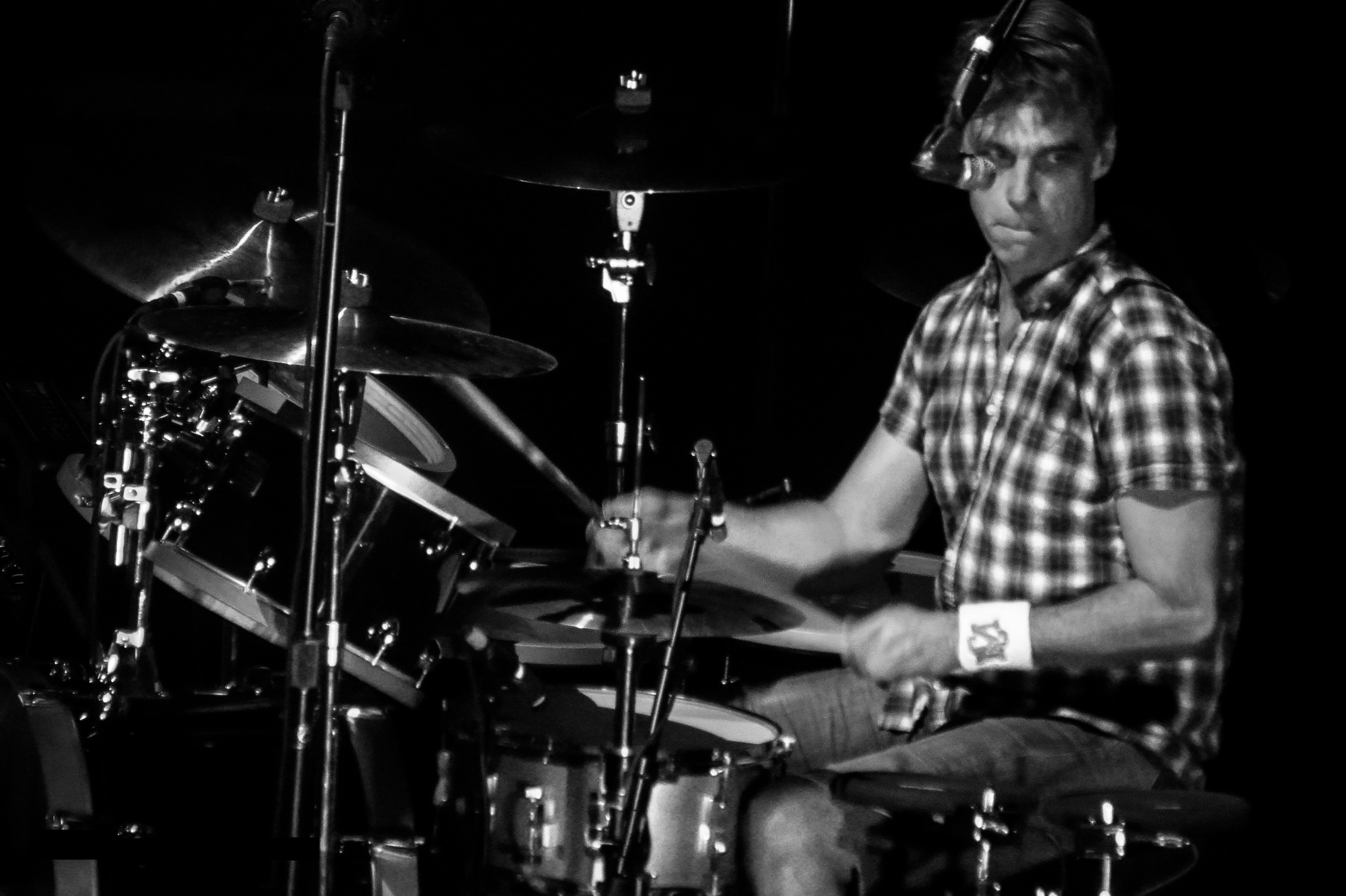
- Cameron drumming with Soundgarden in 2013

Background information
- Also known as: Foo Cameron III; Ted Dameron; MFC
- Born: Matthew David Cameron; November 28, 1962 (age 63); San Diego, California, U.S.
- Genres: Alternative rock; grunge; alternative metal; heavy metal; hard rock
- Occupations: Musician; songwriter
- Instruments: Drums; vocals; guitar; keyboards
- Years active: 1975–present
- Labels: Monkeywrench; Cruz; Sub Pop; SST; A&M; C/Z; Third Gear; Epic; Time Bomb; TVT; Megaforce; J
- Member of: 3rd Secret; Is This Real?
- Formerly of: Pearl Jam; Bam Bam; Soundgarden; Skin Yard; Temple of the Dog; Tone Dogs; Hater; Wellwater Conspiracy

Matthew David Cameron (born November 28, 1962) is an American drummer and songwriter from San Diego, California. He is most known for his work with the Seattle-based rock bands Soundgarden and Pearl Jam.

Cameron joined Soundgarden in 1986 and appeared on each of the band's studio albums. He joined Pearl Jam in 1998 after Soundgarden's initial breakup the year prior and remained a member of the band until announcing his departure on July 7, 2025. Following Soundgarden's reunion in 2010, Cameron was simultaneously a member of Pearl Jam and Soundgarden. He remained with Soundgarden until its second breakup after the death of lead singer Chris Cornell in 2017.

Additionally, Cameron was a member of Temple of the Dog (with fellow Soundgarden and Pearl Jam bandmates) and has served as the drummer for the side project bands Nighttime Boogie Association, Hater and Wellwater Conspiracy, also acting as the lead singer for the latter. Prior to joining Soundgarden, Cameron was a member of the Seattle rock bands Bam Bam and Skin Yard.

In 2016, Rolling Stone ranked Cameron 52nd on its list of the "100 Greatest Drummers of All Time". Cameron is a two-time inductee into the Rock and Roll Hall of Fame: he was inducted with Pearl Jam in 2017, and with Soundgarden in 2025. Cameron has won two Grammy Awards as a member of Soundgarden.

== Early life ==
Matt Cameron was born and raised in San Diego, California. He also grew up in Chula Vista, California. Cameron began playing drums at an early age. At the age of thirteen, he and some friends played in a cover band called "Kiss" (with the word imitation written underneath the name, in small print). During this stunt, he met Paul Stanley. However, after a letter from the management of the band Kiss threatened the boys with legal action if they did not cease their infringement, the band desisted.

Cameron attended Bonita Vista High School. In 1978, under the pseudonym "Foo Cameron", Cameron sang the song "Puberty Love", which was featured in the movie Attack of the Killer Tomatoes. The nickname "Foo" came from Cameron's older brother Pete, who pronounced Matthew as "Ma Foo".

== Musical career ==
=== Bam Bam (1983-1984) & Skin Yard (1985–1986) ===
In 1983, Cameron moved to Seattle, Washington, where he got a job working at a Kinko's. His first professional work as a drummer was for Bam Bam, fronted by early grunge lead singer Tina Bell and guitarist Tommy Martin, the parents of Academy Award winning documentary film director TJ Martin.

He next played in the local instrumental band feeDBack with musician Daniel House. Following feeDBack, Cameron joined House in 1985 in the newly formed Skin Yard. The band had been formed in January 1985 by House and Jack Endino. Cameron stayed with the group for almost a year. In 1986, Skin Yard contributed two songs to the now-legendary Deep Six compilation. This album was the first to showcase the early grunge sound. The band released its first album in 1986, Skin Yard. Cameron wrote the song "Reptile" for the band, which appears on its first record. (More of Cameron's work with Skin Yard can be found on the 2001 rarities compilation, Start at the Top.) Shortly after the release of Skin Yard, Cameron left the band, later joining Soundgarden.

=== Soundgarden (1986–1997; 2010–2017) ===
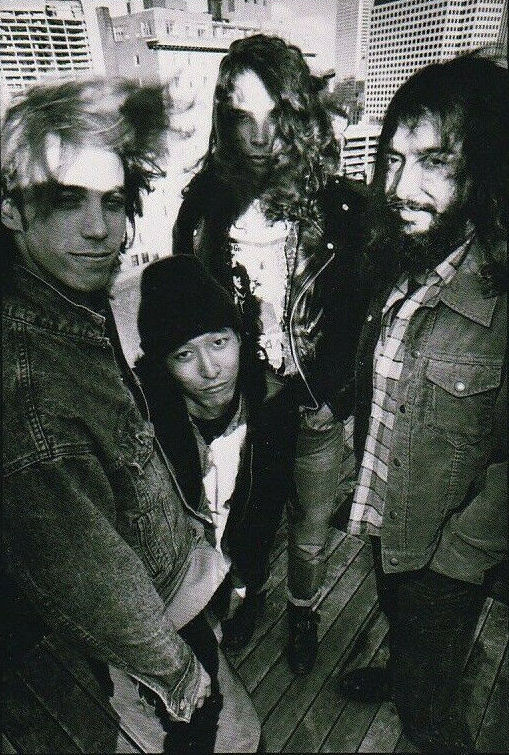
Cameron (left) as a member of Soundgarden in 1987

By September 1986, Cameron had gained so much notoriety in the local music scene that he was chosen to play for Soundgarden, replacing drummer Scott Sundquist. Soundgarden was made up of vocalist/guitarist Chris Cornell, guitarist Kim Thayil, and bassist Hiro Yamamoto. Cornell said, "When I first met Matt, he was already the best drummer in town ... He just seemed very confident and well-adjusted." The band signed with the independent label Sub Pop and released the Screaming Life EP in 1987 and the Fopp EP in 1988. In 1988, the band signed with legendary punk record label SST Records and released its debut full-length album Ultramega OK. The album earned the band its first major award nomination, a Grammy Award, in 1990. The band subsequently signed with A&M Records, becoming the first grunge band to sign to a major label. In 1989, the band released its first album for a major label, Louder Than Love. Following the release of Louder Than Love, Yamamoto left the band to finish his master's degree in Physical Chemistry at Western Washington University. He was replaced by former Nirvana guitarist Jason Everman. Everman was fired following Soundgarden's tour supporting Louder Than Love.

In 1990, the band was joined by a new bassist, Ben Shepherd. The new line-up released Badmotorfinger in 1991. The album brought the band to a new level of commercial success, and the band found itself amidst the sudden popularity and attention given to the Seattle music scene and the genre known as grunge. Badmotorfinger was nominated for a Grammy Award for Best Metal Performance in 1992. The band's next album was to be its breakthrough. Superunknown, released in 1994, debuted at number one on the Billboard 200 and launched several successful singles, including "Spoonman" and "Black Hole Sun". Cameron's drumming is showcased throughout the album, as he provides the complex backbeat (and plenty of improvisation) to the unusual time signatures present on many of the tracks. The album was nominated for the Grammy Award for Best Rock Album in 1995. Two singles from Superunknown, "Black Hole Sun" and "Spoonman", won Grammy Awards, and the music video for "Black Hole Sun" won a MTV Video Music Award and a Clio Award. Superunknown was ranked number 336 on Rolling Stone magazine's list of the 500 greatest albums of all time, and "Black Hole Sun" was ranked number 25 on VH1's list of the 100 greatest songs of the '90s. In 1996, the band released its fifth studio album, Down on the Upside; while successful, the album could not emulate the precedent set by Superunknown. Tensions within the group arose during the Down on the Upside sessions, with Thayil and Cornell reportedly clashing over Cornell's desire to shift away from the heavy guitar riffing that had become the band's trademark. In 1997, Soundgarden received another Grammy nomination, for the lead single "Pretty Noose". In 1997, the band broke up due to internal strife over its creative direction. In a 1998 interview, Thayil said, "It was pretty obvious from everybody's general attitude over the course of the previous half-year that there was some dissatisfaction." Cameron later said that Soundgarden was "eaten up by the business."

On January 1, 2010, Cornell announced on his Twitter that Soundgarden would be reuniting. The official website relaunched soon thereafter. The band had begun recording a new album in February 2011, which was later released in November 2012, known as King Animal.

While a member of Soundgarden, Cameron wrote the following songs for the band:

- "He Didn't" (Ultramega OK) ... music
- "Jesus Christ Pose" (Badmotorfinger) ... music (co-written)
- "Room a Thousand Years Wide" (Badmotorfinger) ... music
- "Drawing Flies" (Badmotorfinger) ... music
- "New Damage" (Badmotorfinger) ... music (co-written)
- "Birth Ritual" (Singles soundtrack) ... music (co-written)
- "Exit Stonehenge" ("Spoonman" single) ... music (co-written)
- "Mailman" (Superunknown) ... music, and played mellotron
- "Limo Wreck" (Superunknown) ... music (co-written)
- "Fresh Tendrils" (Superunknown) ... lyrics (co-written) and music
- "Jerry Garcia's Finger" (Songs from the Superunknown) ... music (co-written)
- "Rhinosaur" (Down on the Upside) ... music
- "Applebite" (Down on the Upside) ... music, and played Moog synthesizer
- "A Splice of Space Jam" ("Blow Up the Outside World" single) ... music (co-written)
- "By Crooked Steps" (King Animal) ... music (co-written)
- "Eyelid's Mouth" (King Animal) ... music

The task of figuring out the time signatures for Soundgarden's songs was usually left to Cameron. Regarding his drumming with Soundgarden, Modern Drummer stated that Cameron "always injected a maturity into Soundgarden's music. His ghost-note grooves and the uncanny ability to make odd time feel like straight time have already earned him status among rock's drumming's elite pacemakers."

On November 15, 2013, Cameron announced that he would not be touring with Soundgarden in 2014, due to prior commitments promoting Pearl Jam's album Lightning Bolt.

=== Pearl Jam (1998–2025) ===
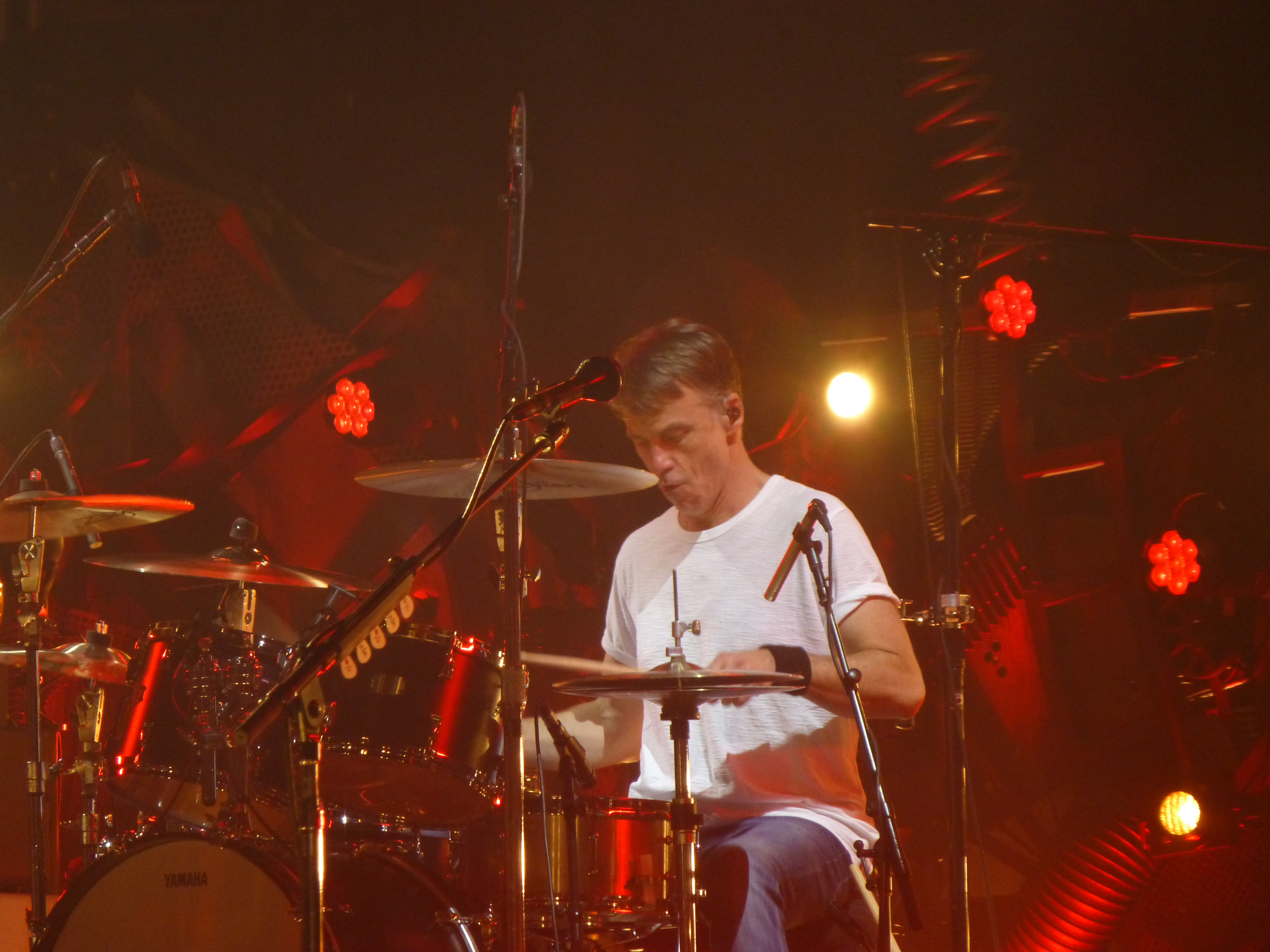
Cameron with Pearl Jam in 2018

Almost a year after Soundgarden's breakup, in summer 1998, Cameron was invited by rock-colleagues Pearl Jam to drum on its U.S. Yield Tour after the band's drummer Jack Irons left due to the touring scheduling conflicting with his health issues and a desire to spend more time with his family. Cameron had worked with members of the band before on the Temple of the Dog project and had helped them record some early instrumental demos in 1990. Cameron said, "I got a phone call out of the blue, from Mr. Ed Ved, Stoney and Kelly (Curtis, Pearl Jam's manager). I was ambushed. It was really short notice. He called and said 'hey what are you doing this summer?'" Guitarist Mike McCready said, "We knew him from being around the same scene and seeing him on tour. It had a lot to do with it. We knew he was a normal cat too, a normal guy." Cameron learned over 80 songs in two weeks. He was hired on an initially temporary basis, but soon, during the tour, he was invited to become a full-time member. Cameron stated, "The guys made me feel real welcome and it wasn't a struggle to get it musically, but my style was a little bit different, I think, than what they were used to. And they've been through so many different drummers, I don't even know if they knew what they wanted. So, I just kind of played the way I played and then eventually we kind of figured out what worked best for the band."

Cameron has since become the longest serving drummer of the band. McCready stated that Cameron has made Pearl Jam "into a way better band." In 1998, Pearl Jam, with Cameron on drums, recorded "Last Kiss", a cover of a 1960s ballad made famous by J. Frank Wilson and the Cavaliers. It was released on the band's 1998 fan club Christmas single; however, by popular demand, the cover was released to the public as a single in 1999. "Last Kiss" peaked at number two on the Billboard charts and became the band's highest-charting single. In 2000, the band released its sixth studio album, Binaural, and initiated a successful and ongoing series of official bootlegs. The band released seventy-two such live albums in 2000 and 2001, and set a record for most albums to debut in the Billboard 200 at the same time. "Grievance" (from Binaural) received a Grammy nomination for Best Hard Rock Performance. The band released its seventh studio album, Riot Act, in 2002. Pearl Jam's contribution to the 2003 film, Big Fish, "Man of the Hour", was nominated for a Golden Globe Award in 2004. The band's eighth studio album, the eponymous Pearl Jam, was released in 2006. The band released its ninth studio album, Backspacer, in 2009. Their tenth studio album Lightning Bolt was released in 2013. Their eleventh studio album Gigaton was released March 27, 2020. In May 2022, Cameron was forced to miss his first shows in 24 years since joining Pearl Jam due to testing positive for the COVID-19 virus. Josh Klinghoffer and Richard Stuverud filled in on drums for Cameron. He tested positive again In September 2023 whilst the band were on a US tour forcing him to miss out on the first night in Indianapolis with Klinghoffer once again filling in for him this time for the whole show.

While not as frequent as the other members' written contributions, Cameron's are held in high regard by the band, as are his performances. In the liner notes of the 2003 Lost Dogs compilation, Pearl Jam vocalist Eddie Vedder says:

Matt Cameron writes songs and we run to find step stools in order to reach his level, ... what comes naturally to him leaves us with our heads cocked like the confused dogs that we are, ... eventually getting it. Did we mention he's the greatest drummer on the planet?

On July 7, 2025, Cameron announced his departure from Pearl Jam on his Instagram account, stating that he was "forever grateful to the crew, staff and fans the world over."

=== Other musical projects (1990–present) ===
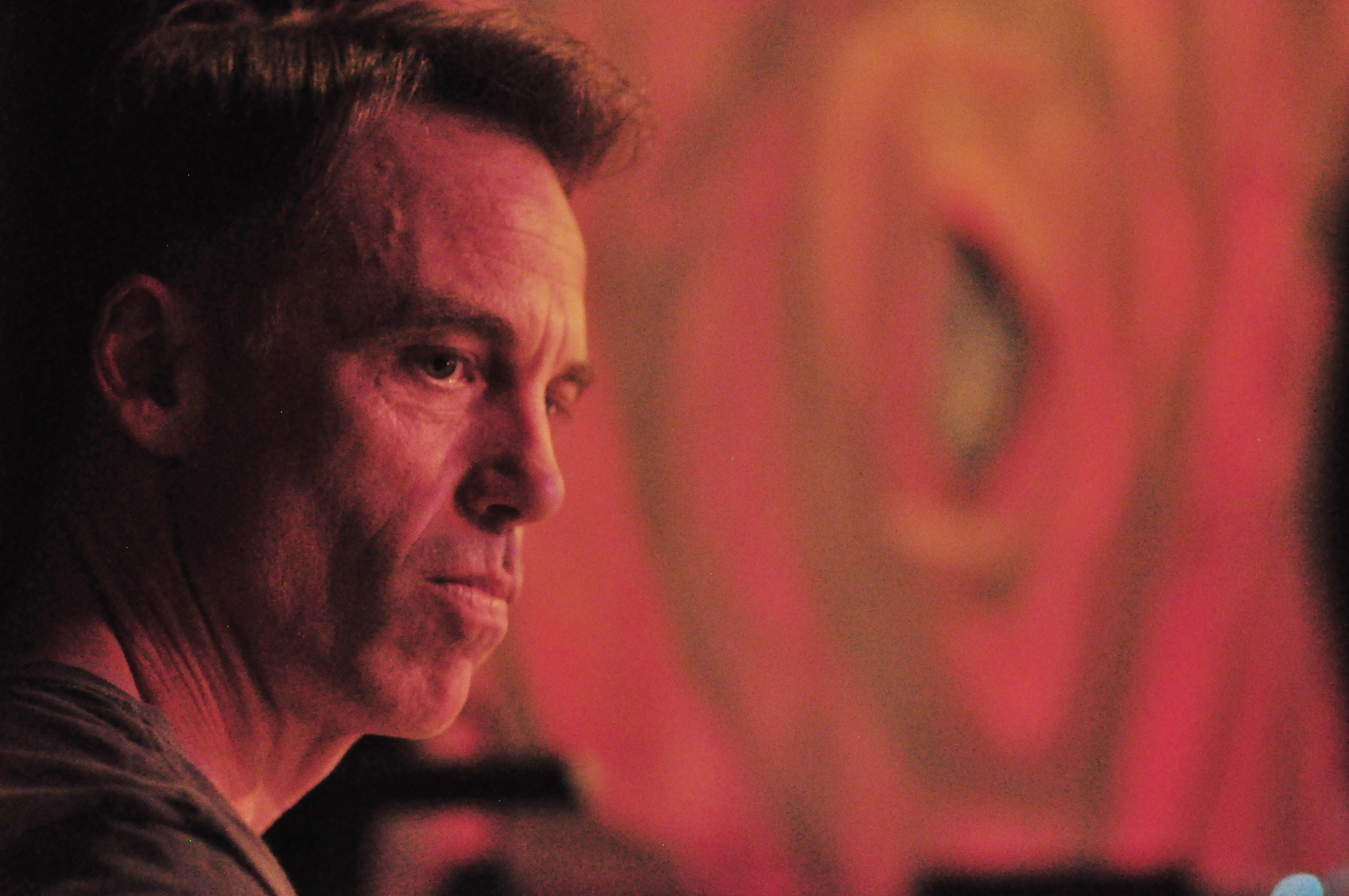
Cameron sitting in with Wayne Horvitz's Pigpen (not shown), February 2016

Along with Cornell, Stone Gossard, Jeff Ament, McCready, and Vedder, Cameron appeared on the 1991 Temple of the Dog album. The album paid tribute to Mother Love Bone vocalist Andrew Wood, who died of a heroin overdose at age 24.

He has played in two jazz-influenced side projects: Tone Dogs in the early 1990s, and Harrybu McCage, which formed in 2008. He recorded with the Tone Dogs for their debut album Ankety Low Day, which was released in 1990. Cameron also has a fondness for psychedelic garage rock, and his side projects Hater and Wellwater Conspiracy reflect this. Cameron formed Hater in 1993 with Soundgarden bassist Ben Shepherd. The band released a self-titled album in 1993 and recorded a second album in 1995 following Soundgarden's Superunknown tour. The band's second album, The 2nd, would not see release until 2005. Cameron founded Wellwater Conspiracy with Shepherd and guitarist John McBain. The band's debut album, Declaration of Conformity, was released in 1997. Following Shepherd's departure from the band in 1998, Cameron took over lead vocal duties for the band. Cameron and McBain maintained the group after Cameron joined Pearl Jam, and a further three Wellwater Conspiracy albums were released following the band's debut album (Brotherhood of Electric: Operational Directives (1999), The Scroll and Its Combinations (2001), and Wellwater Conspiracy (2003)).

He worked with electronic punk act The Prodigy on their album The Fat of the Land, playing on the track "Narayan".

Cameron played drums at first show of Queens Of The Stone Age on November 20, 1997, at the OK Hotel in Seattle, however he did not join the band as its drummer. He also appeared with them in 2008, at the memorial concert for Natasha Shneider, playing double drums along with their then-current drummer Joey Castillo, of which various Queens of the Stone Age and Desert Sessions songs, as well as covers by artists including The Doors and Cream, were played.

Cameron contributed his drumming on seven tracks considered for The Smashing Pumpkins' 1998 album, Adore, though only "For Martha" appeared on the album. Another studio track, "Because You Are", surfaced on the 2001 B-sides and rarities collection, Judas O. Rumors circulated in the beginning of 1998 that he was considered as a permanent drummer replacement for Jimmy Chamberlin, but Cameron denied this.

Other drumming contributions by Cameron include four tracks on Eleven's 1995 album, Thunk, the track "Disappearing One" on former bandmate Chris Cornell's 1999 solo album, Euphoria Morning, and Geddy Lee's 2000 solo album, My Favourite Headache.

Cameron has enjoyed a friendship with fellow drummer Jeremy Taggart of Canadian rock group Our Lady Peace. When Taggart was sidelined with an ankle injury during the recording of that group's 2000 album, Spiritual Machines, Cameron played drums on two songs on the album, "Right Behind You (Mafia)" and "Are You Sad?". Cameron contributed to the soundtrack for the 2002 film Spider-Man, playing on "Hero" with Chad Kroeger and Josey Scott. As Cameron was unable to attend the shoot, Jeremy Taggart returned the favor and is shown in Cameron's place in the video.

Cameron, along with Pearl Jam bandmate Mike McCready, contributed two songs to Peter Frampton's instrumental album, Fingerprints (2006). These include a cover of Soundgarden's "Black Hole Sun" and "Blowin' Smoke".

Cameron has lent his talents to Submersible Music's DrumCore software.

In 2013, Cameron performed with drummers Janet Weiss of Sleater Kinney, and Zach Hill of Death Grips on an all-drum album entitled Drumgasm.

In 2020, Nighttime Boogie Association released their first two singles. The supergroup formed by Cameron, Taylor Hawkins, Buzz Osborne and Steven McDonald described plans in 2021 to continue releasing more music; however, this was cut short after Hawkins' untimely and tragic passing in 2022.

In 2021 Cameron, along with Kim Thayil, bassist Krist Novoselic (Nirvana, Giants in the Trees), guitarist Bubba Dupree (Hater, Void), and vocalists Jennifer Johnson and Jillian Raye (Giants in the Trees) formed the group 3rd Secret. Their self-titled debut album, which they recorded at The Bait Shop in Bellevue, Washington with producer Jack Endino was released in April 2022. The group also performed at the Museum of Pop Culture in Seattle. Also in 2021, Cameron and Thayil were featured on the track "Only Love Can Save Me Now" on The Pretty Reckless album, Death by Rock and Roll, with both also appearing in the video for the song.

On October 3, 2026, Cameron will appear at the Power to the People Festival at Merriweather Post Pavilion in Columbia, MD. The festival, which is being put on by Tom Morello, will also feature performances by Morello, Bruce Springsteen, Foo Fighters and many others. The festival is being held in response to President Donald Trump.

== Musical style and influences ==
Cameron was described by Greg Prato of AllMusic as "unquestionably one of rock's finest and most versatile drummers". Known for his creativity, power, and precision, Cameron's style is one that does not instinctively seek to dominate a song, but rather tease out a groove that will complement and support its atmosphere. Examples of this can be clearly heard in Temple of the Dog's "Wooden Jesus" or Soundgarden's "Mind Riot" and "Applebite". Cameron's time in Pearl Jam has helped see his technique mellow to a more modest backing role, providing support for the more straightforward nature of Pearl Jam's matured style compared to Soundgarden's more extreme and unusual tendencies, e.g., the song "Face Pollution". Despite a career in rock music, Cameron stated in a 1989 radio interview that growing up he "wasn't a big rock fan ..." and that his musical tastes during his youth were "more into jazz." Cameron has professed that his primary musical interests lie in progressive rock and various jazz subgenres, including hard bop, both of which are characterized by a much busier playing style than Cameron typically exhibits, especially in the aforementioned matured Pearl Jam. Cameron has cited Keith Moon of the Who as his biggest musical influence.

Cameron tends to revisit the paradiddle for effect. Examples include the spreading of the RLRR-LRLL pattern amongst ride and snare on Soundgarden's "Never the Machine Forever" (from Down on the Upside), "Unemployable" (from Pearl Jam), creating a driving shuffle; and "You Are" (from Riot Act). This pattern can also be heard during the bridge of "Bleed Together" (from the "Burden in My Hand" single). Cameron also is well known for his use of tom grooves and tribal patterns, the most famous of which being the tour-de-force "Jesus Christ Pose" figure, as well as "Little Joe", "Gun", and "Spoonman". Cameron also incorporated the technique of open-handed drumming into his playing, particularly around the Badmotorfinger period in Soundgarden, specifically the tracks "Slaves & Bulldozers", the outro of "Rusty Cage", and "Somewhere", and used the technique later on Superunknown's "Limo Wreck."

== Equipment ==
Throughout the 80s and 90s, Cameron favored two to three crashes (generally matching 19-inch Zildjian Avedis Rock crashes and eventually Z Customs by Superunknown touring period), an A or K ride of 20 or 21 inches, and 15-inch hi hats with an occasional 10-inch splash or bell. China cymbals were used throughout the '80s but infrequently in the '90s, and were eliminated from his live setup by Badmotorfinger. Even after becoming a full-time member of Pearl Jam, Cameron's cymbal setup did not change radically from his Soundgarden days. Currently, the most noticeable difference is his use of the A and K series as opposed to the heavier Z Custom series.

Though Cameron is best known for his use of equipment from California-based Drum Workshop during his initial time with Soundgarden, he used his own Yamaha kit before 1990 when he started using DW, which he later admittedly approached after Yamaha first turned down his endorsement. Most early Soundgarden records up until Badmotorfinger including the Temple of the Dog record were done with an 8000 series kit in a "real wood" finish. By the autumn of 1991, however, Cameron started playing copper gloss finished DW's with 12 and 13-inch rack toms, a 15-inch floor tom, and a 22-inch bass drum with black gloss hoops and a 14-inch knurled steel snare. By 1993 his Superunknown era kit arrived, a black gloss kit with 12, 13, and a 14-inch hanging tom, which Cameron would mount on a snare stand, a 16-inch floor tom and a 24x16 inch bass drum. Cameron revealed in a 1994 interview with Modern Drummer magazine that to greater emphasize the dynamic shift on the song "Like Suicide", both kits were used, the latter having shells both larger in depth and diameter. Superunknown is well known for its huge drum sound and practices such as this brought attention in the drumming world. Other examples include the use of all ride cymbals on "Black Hole Sun" and 3 drummers playing at the same time at the end of "Head Down", being Cameron, Soundgarden bassist Ben Shepherd and drum technician and craftsman Gregg Keplinger. Cameron, along with fellow Northwesterner William Goldsmith (Sunny Day Real Estate and Foo Fighters), was an early user of Keplinger's snares, famous for perhaps being the heaviest stainless steel snare drum available.

By the recording of 1996's Down on the Upside, and the album's subsequent tour, Cameron endorsed the Canadian custom outfit Ayotte, a company Keplinger had teamed with offering mass-produced steel snares, and soon cohorts and fellow Keplinger fans Jeremy Taggart (Our Lady Peace), Matt Chamberlain (Pearl Jam, session), and Joey Waronker (Beck, Atoms for Peace) joined as well. During the recording of Down on the Upside in 1995 and a short European tour in the middle of making it, Cameron used natural maple finished Ayotte's with wood hoops with 10, 12, and 13-inch rack toms, 16 and 18-inch floor toms, and a 22-inch bass drum, with Ayotte/Keplinger snares or his longtime favorite Keplinger 14x7 stainless steel snare. By the album's official tour in 1996, a new kit with updated OEM hardware made by Tay-e, including bass drum mounted tom mounts, in the same sizes but with dark purple sparkle finish and a 24-inch silver sparkle bass drum was used all the way up to Soundgarden's breakup. Following his hiring for Pearl Jam's U.S. Yield Tour in 1998 Cameron continued using his purple Ayotte kit, which would stay intact for the most part for the next 4 years including touring for Binaural in 2000. All throughout this period Cameron continued using equipment manufactured by DW, including pedals, cymbal stands, and snare stands.

Following a corporate mutiny resulting in the resignation of Ray Ayotte from his own company and the subsequent end in partnership with Gregg Keplinger, Cameron switched to Yamaha in 2002, and Cameron's subsequent time with Pearl Jam is notable for his shift away from maple-shelled drums, arguably the most popular drum material for its overall even frequency response and overall melodic tone. Cameron began endorsing and using Yamaha's Birch Custom Absolute drums in a vintage natural finish that year. Compared to maple shelled drums, birch is higher-pitched with a quicker attack and produces fewer overtones. By 2009, he began experimenting with another type of wood, the Yamaha Oak Custom in a black gloss finish with Yamaha Vintage Maple hoops, similar to his old Ayotte's. Oak drums are noted for their additional attack and projection, with a similar fundamental tone to maple. He used this kit through the period of Soundgarden's reformation.

In 2018 Cameron returned to maple with Yamaha's Absolute Hybrid Maple in a satin black stain but with stock steel hoops. His current setup continues his longtime use of 12, 13, 16-inch toms, with a shallow 24 bass drum, more specifically 12×8, 13×9, 16×16, and 24×14. He occasionally uses a 14×14 floor tom on his left side and an 18×16 floor tom when not using 14×7 Alex Acuña timbale for certain songs in Pearl Jam. His switches his snares between his various Gregg Keplinger built models and Yamaha productions, varying from copper and aluminum shelled models to discontinued signature snares for David Garibaldi, Roy Haynes, and Steve Gadd. Lately he has also experimented with Kapur shelled Yamaha Club Customs and his Yamaha/Steve Gadd 30th anniversary drum set. He has also used a Yamaha Steve Jordan signature cocktail kit live occasionally.

Matt endorses Yamaha drums and hardware, Zildjian cymbals, Vic Firth drumsticks, and Remo Drumheads.

== Personal life ==
Cameron married his longtime girlfriend April Acevez on October 25, 1997. Between at least 2006 and 2014, they resided in Woodway, Washington with their two children. Outside of his music career, Cameron is an avid runner.

Cameron's favorite literary author is Franz Kafka.

== Discography ==
Soundgarden

- Ultramega OK (1988)
- Louder Than Love (1989)
- Badmotorfinger (1991)
- Superunknown (1994)
- Down on the Upside (1996)
- King Animal (2012)

Pearl Jam

- Binaural (2000)
- Riot Act (2002)
- Pearl Jam (2006)
- Backspacer (2009)
- Lightning Bolt (2013)
- Gigaton (2020)
- Dark Matter (2024)

Solo

- Cavedweller (2017)
- Gory Scorch Cretins (2023)
