= List of RPM number-one alternative rock singles =

This is a list of RPM magazine's Rock/Alternative number-one singles of its entire publication from June 11, 1995, to November 6, 2000. There are also some records listed.

== Records ==
Consecutive weeks at #1

The Tragically Hip – "Poets" (12)
Marcy Playground – "Sex and Candy (7)
Filter – "Take a Picture" (7)
U2 – "Beautiful Day" (7)
The Wallflowers – "Heroes" (6)
The Tea Party – "Heaven Coming Down" (6)
Foo Fighters – "Learn to Fly" (6)
Red Hot Chili Peppers – "Otherside" (6)

Non-consecutive weeks at #1

3 Doors Down – "Kryptonite" (10)
Marcy Playground – "Sex and Candy" (8)
Filter – "Take a Picture" (8)
Foo Fighters – "Learn to Fly" (7)
Soundgarden – "Pretty Noose" (6)
Days of the New – "Enemy" (6)
Smash Mouth – "Walkin' on the Sun" (5)

Most songs to reach #1

The Smashing Pumpkins (5)
Red Hot Chili Peppers (5)
U2 (5)
Green Day (4)
Oasis (4)
Bush (3)
Pearl Jam (3)
Everclear (3)

Cumulative weeks at #1

Red Hot Chili Peppers (20)
U2 (18)
Tragically Hip (13)
Smashing Pumpkins (10)
Soundgarden (9)

- Additionally, "Anybody Seen My Baby?" by The Rolling Stones is the only song to ever have debuted at the top spot.

== Chart history ==
Issue date	Song	Artist	Weeks at No. 1	Ref(s)
June 11, 1995	"More Human than Human"	White Zombie	1	
June 19, 1995	"Misery"	Soul Asylum	3	
July 10, 1995	"Hold Me, Thrill Me, Kiss Me, Kill Me"	U2	2	
July 24, 1995	"This Is a Call"	Foo Fighters	4	
August 21, 1995	"Tomorrow"	Silverchair	3	
September 11, 1995	"J.A.R."	Green Day	1	
September 18, 1995	"Comedown"	Bush^{x}	2	
October 2, 1995	"Lump"	The Presidents of the United States of America	1	
October 9, 1995	"Name"	Goo Goo Dolls	1	
October 16, 1995	"Geek Stink Breath"	Green Day	3	
November 6, 1995	"Bullet with Butterfly Wings"	The Smashing Pumpkins	4	
December 4, 1995	"My Friends"	Red Hot Chili Peppers	3	
January 8, 1996	"One of Us"	Joan Osborne	1	
January 15, 1996	"Wonderwall"	Oasis	2	
January 29, 1996	"Brain Stew"	Green Day	3	
February 19, 1996	"1979"	The Smashing Pumpkins	1	
February 26, 1996	"Peaches"	The Presidents of the United States of America	3	
March 18, 1996	"Ironic"	Alanis Morissette	1	
March 25, 1996	"Zero"	The Smashing Pumpkins	1	
April 1, 1996	"Aeroplane"	Red Hot Chili Peppers	1	
April 8, 1996	"Big Bang Baby"	Stone Temple Pilots	2	
April 22, 1996	"Champagne Supernova"	Oasis	1	
April 29, 1996	"Big Bang Baby"	Stone Temple Pilots	1	
May 6, 1996	"Champagne Supernova"	Oasis	1	
May 13, 1996	"Machinehead"	Bush^{x}	1	
May 20, 1996	"Ahead by a Century"	The Tragically Hip	1	
May 27, 1996	"Pretty Noose"	Soundgarden	3	
June 17, 1996	"One More Astronaut"	I Mother Earth	1	
June 24, 1996	"Pretty Noose"	Soundgarden	3	
July 15, 1996	"Trippin' on a Hole in a Paper Heart"	Stone Temple Pilots	4	
August 12, 1996	"Burden in My Hand"	Soundgarden	3	
September 2, 1996	"Who You Are"	Pearl Jam	2	
September 16, 1996	"Standing Outside a Broken Phone Booth with Money in My Hand"	Primitive Radio Gods	1	
September 23, 1996	"E-Bow the Letter"	R.E.M.	1	
September 30, 1996	"If It Makes You Happy"	Sheryl Crow	1	
October 7, 1996	"Novocaine for the Soul"	Eels	2	
October 21, 1996	"Muzzle"	The Smashing Pumpkins	2	
November 4, 1996	"Aneurysm"	Nirvana	3	
November 25, 1996	"Stinkfist"	Tool	1	
December 2, 1996	"Swallowed"	Bush^{x}	4	
January 20, 1997	"#1 Crush"	Garbage	2	
February 3, 1997	"Discothèque"	U2	5	
March 10, 1997	"Lakini's Juice"	Live	2	
March 24, 1997	"Abuse Me"	Silverchair	2	
April 7, 1997	"Precious Declaration"	Collective Soul	2	
April 21, 1997	"The New Pollution"	Beck	1	
April 28, 1997	"Staring at the Sun"	U2	3	
May 19, 1997	"The Impression That I Get"	The Mighty Mighty Bosstones	2	
June 2, 1997	"Song 2"	Blur	4	
June 30, 1997	"The End Is the Beginning Is the End"	The Smashing Pumpkins	2	
July 14, 1997	"If You Could Only See"	Tonic	1	
July 21, 1997	"The Difference"	The Wallflowers	2	
August 4, 1997	"Last Night on Earth"	U2	1	
August 11, 1997	"Building a Mystery"	Sarah McLachlan	1	
August 18, 1997	"Fly"	Sugar Ray	1	
August 25, 1997	"D'You Know What I Mean?"	Oasis	1	
September 1, 1997	"Fly"	Sugar Ray	1	
September 8, 1997	"D'You Know What I Mean?"	Oasis	1	
September 15, 1997	"Anybody Seen My Baby?"	The Rolling Stones	2	
September 29, 1997	"Walkin' on the Sun"	Smash Mouth	1	
October 6, 1997	"Hitchin' a Ride"	Green Day	1	
October 13, 1997	"Don't Go Away"	Oasis	1	
October 20, 1997	"Walkin' on the Sun"	Smash Mouth	4	
November 17, 1997	"Tubthumping"	Chumbawamba	2	
December 1, 1997	"Everything to Everyone"	Everclear	3	
January 12, 1998	"3 A.M."	Matchbox Twenty	2	
January 26, 1998	"Bitter Sweet Symphony"	The Verve	2	
February 9, 1998	"3 A.M."	Matchbox Twenty	1	
February 16, 1998	"Given to Fly"	Pearl Jam	1	
February 23, 1998	"Sex and Candy"	Marcy Playground	7	
April 13, 1998	"I Will Buy You a New Life"	Everclear	1	
April 20, 1998	"Sex and Candy"	Marcy Playground	1	
April 27, 1998	"The Way"	Fastball	4	
May 25, 1998	"Wishlist"	Pearl Jam	1	
June 1, 1998	"Heroes"	The Wallflowers	6	
July 13, 1998	"Poets"	The Tragically Hip	12	
October 5, 1998	"The Scene"	Big Sugar	1	
October 12, 1998	"Got the Life"	Korn	1	
October 19, 1998	"Celebrity Skin"	Hole	2	
November 2, 1998	"Got the Life"	Korn	1	
November 9, 1998	"Dragula"	Rob Zombie	1	
November 16, 1998	"Do You Want to Get Heavy"	Jon Spencer Blues Explosion	5	
Dec 15, 1998-Apr 11, 1999	No charts	No charts		
April 12, 1999	"Free Girl Now"	Tom Petty and the Heartbreakers	1	
April 19, 1999	"Heavy"	Collective Soul	2	
May 3, 1999	"Free Girl Now"	Tom Petty and the Heartbreakers	1	
May 10, 1999	"Mas Tequila"	Sammy Hagar	2	
May 24, 1999	"Lit Up"	Buckcherry	3	
June 14, 1999	"Heaven Coming Down"	The Tea Party	6	
July 26, 1999	"Scar Tissue"	Red Hot Chili Peppers	5	
August 30, 1999	"Smooth"	Santana featuring Rob Thomas	2	
September 13, 1999	"One Man Army"	Our Lady Peace	1	
September 20, 1999	"Enemy"	Days of the New	4	
October 18, 1999	"One Man Army"	Our Lady Peace	1	
October 25, 1999	"Enemy"	Days of the New	1	
November 1, 1999	"The Dolphin's Cry"	Live	1	
November 8, 1999	"Enemy"	Days of the New	1	
November 15, 1999	"Learn to Fly"	Foo Fighters	6	
January 10, 2000	"Take a Picture"	Filter	1	
January 17, 2000	"Learn to Fly"	Foo Fighters	1	
January 24, 2000	"Take a Picture"	Filter	7	
March 13, 2000	"Load Me Up"	Matthew Good Band	1	
March 20, 2000	"Otherside"	Red Hot Chili Peppers	6	
May 1, 2000	"Everything You Want"	Vertical Horizon	1	
May 8, 2000	"Kryptonite"	3 Doors Down	5	
June 12, 2000	"Bent"	Matchbox Twenty	2	
June 26, 2000	"Kryptonite"	3 Doors Down	5	
July 31, 2000	"With Arms Wide Open"	Creed	1	
August 7, 2000	"Wonderful"	Everclear	2	
August 21, 2000	"Californication"	Red Hot Chili Peppers	5	
September 25, 2000	"Beautiful Day"	U2	7	

== See also ==
- List of RPM number-one alternative rock singles of 1995
- List of RPM number-one alternative rock singles of 1996
