= No Way Out (Stone Temple Pilots song) =

2000 promotional single by Stone Temple Pilots

Promotional single by Stone Temple Pilots

from the album No. 4
- Released: September 26, 2000
- Genre: Nu metal; heavy metal
- Length: 4:19 (album version); 4:00 (single version)
- Label: Atlantic
- Songwriters: Scott Weiland; Robert DeLeo; Dean DeLeo; Eric Kretz
- Producer: Brendan O'Brien

Stone Temple Pilots promotional single chronology
| "Heaven & Hot Rods" (1999) | "No Way Out" (2000) | "Wonderful" (2002) |

"No Way Out" is a song by the American rock band Stone Temple Pilots that appears as the sixth track on their fourth studio album, No. 4 (1999). Written by all four members of the band and produced by Brendan O'Brien, the song centers on frontman Scott Weiland's battles with drug addiction and his personal demons, such as his prison sentence in February 1999. Alongside "Sex & Violence" and "MC5", the song is considered one of the heaviest on the album.

A promotional single was released by Atlantic Records in September 2000 and peaked at number 17 on the US Billboard Mainstream Rock Tracks chart and number 24 on the Billboard Modern Rock Tracks chart. A music video, directed by Bart Lipton and using footage from the band's concerts, was also released in 2000.

== Composition and lyrics ==
"No Way Out" is a somber song with a duration of four minutes and 19 seconds. The heavy metal song dynamically shifts from a subtly nuanced but heavy riff to spacey interludes. As a result of this, and the repeated cursing, the song has been compared to nu metal of the time, such as Korn. Alongside the album opener, "Down", the song is built on "sort steely riffs," seen as reminiscent of James Hetfield's rhythm guitaring in Metallica.

Written by all four members of the band and produced by Brendan O'Brien, the song centers on frontman Scott Weiland's battles with drug addiction and his personal demons. In an interview while Weiland was incarcerated for drug charges, guitarist Dean DeLeo stated "the judge saved his life."

== Release ==
Atlantic Records released a clean version of "No Way Out" as a promotional single on September 26, 2000. The song was issued on a CD and shortened to four minutes. Despite this, the tray card listed the time as three minutes and 45 seconds. While not released outside the US, the song is one of many promos by Stone Temple Pilots to chart, with it peaking at No. 24 on the Billboard Mainstream Rock Tracks chart and No. 17 on the Billboard Modern Rock Tracks chart.

== Critical reception ==
Ryan Reed of Ultimate Classic Rock labeled the song, and "Down", as juggernauts that surpass nu metal of the time, with their "dynamic shifts and subtly nuanced riffs." Rob O'Connor, Ira Robbins and Clifford Corcaron of Trouser Press opined the song's mix of "whimsical power pop" from Tiny Music... Songs from the Vatican Gift Shop (1996), and "brooding riffage" from Core (1992) is a mixed bag, with its "sludgy grind" becoming tiresome. Chad Childers of Loudwire brought up the song, alongside "Down" and "Sour Girl", as standout singles from No. 4 that finished out the "band's first era."

The song was ranked at No. 31 on The Daily Vault's list of "Elegant Bachelors: A Stone Temple Pilots Song Countdown", While praising the song as a "slab of nu metal" fueled by a nasty riff and spacy interludes, he feels it comes up short of what other artists were already doing in the genre.

== Music video ==
The music video was directed by Bart Lipton by having 400 radio station contest winners videotape a private concert of the band performing. Footage from the tapes was edited together to form the video. The group wanted their fans to make their video because they were fed up with the state of music videos, which they felt were shallow and formulaic.

The first video the band submitted was banned by MTV due to excessive nudity. It was re-edited and put into rotation in 2000, but despite this, has never been uploaded on the band's official YouTube channel.

== Personnel ==
Personnel are adapted from the "No Way Out" liner notes.

Stone Temple Pilots

- Dean DeLeo – electric guitar
- Robert DeLeo – bass guitar
- Eric Kretz – drums
- Scott Weiland – lead vocals

Production and additional personnel

- Brendan O'Brien – production, mixing
- Nick DiDia – recording
- Russ Fowler – recording
- Andrew Garver – editing
- Stephen Marcussen – mastering
- Dave Reed – engineering
- Allen Sides – engineering

== Charts ==
| Chart (2000) | Peak position |
|---|---|
| US Alternative Airplay (Billboard) | 24 |
| US Mainstream Rock (Billboard) | 17 |

== Release history ==
| Region | Date | Format(s) | Label(s) | Ref. |
|---|---|---|---|---|
| United States | September 26, 2000 | Mainstream rock; active rock; alternative radio | Atlantic | |
