= List of RPM number-one alternative rock singles of 1996 =

This is a list of RPM's number one weekly alternative rock singles chart in Canada for 1996. This chart was first published 11 June 1995 (Note: The first entry Rock/Alternative – Volume 20, No. 20, 10 November 1973 is a catalogue error, further evidenced by the LW (last week) statistic "New".) as the Alternative 30 by RPM magazine. (Note: The magazine's weekly record charts were digitized by the AV Trust. This collection of the Alternative Singles chart is archived by Library and Archives Canada, here. You must view each entry on the chart for a match, when not searching by position number. The PDF text search does not work unless you have DjVu software plug-in installed on your computer.) In early 1999, the magazine renamed the chart to Rock Report. (Note: The first available chart for 1999 is Rock/Alternative – Volume 68, No. 25, 12 April 1999.) This chart was published most weeks (Note: The last entry for this chart is Volume 64, No. 18. The first chart for 1997 is number 19.) until the magazine's demise 13 November 2000.

RPM's number one Alternative rock single for 1996, as published in their chart "Year End Alternative ~ Top 50", was Soundgarden's "Burden in My Hand".

== Weekly chart ==
Date	Issue	Single	Artist	Ref.
8 January	Volume 62, No. 21	"One of Us"	Joan Osborne	
15 January	Volume 62, No. 22	"Wonderwall"	Oasis	
22 January	Volume 62, No. 23	"Wonderwall"	Oasis	
29 January	Volume 62, No. 24	"Brain Stew"	Green Day	
5 February	Volume 62, No. 25	"Brain Stew"	Green Day	
12 February	Volume 62, No. 26	"Brain Stew"	Green Day	
19 February	Volume 63, No. 1	"1979"	The Smashing Pumpkins	
26 February	Volume 63, No. 2	"Peaches"	The Presidents of the United States of America	
4 March	Volume 63, No. 3	"Peaches"	The Presidents of the United States of America	
11 March	Volume 63, No. 4	"Peaches"	The Presidents of the United States of America	
18 March	Volume 63, No. 5	"Ironic"	Alanis Morissette	
25 March	Volume 63, No. 6	"Zero"	The Smashing Pumpkins	
1 April	Volume 63, No. 7	"Aeroplane"	Red Hot Chili Peppers	
8 April	Volume 63, No. 8	"Big Bang Baby"	Stone Temple Pilots	
15 April	Volume 63, No. 9	"Big Bang Baby"	Stone Temple Pilots	
22 April	Volume 63, No. 10	"Champagne Supernova"	Oasis	
29 April	Volume 63, No. 11	"Big Bang Baby"	Stone Temple Pilots	
6 May	Volume 63, No. 12	"Champagne Supernova"	Oasis	
13 May	Volume 63, No. 13	"Machinehead"	Bush X	
20 May	Volume 63, No. 14	"Ahead By a Century"	Tragically Hip	
27 May	Volume 63, No. 15	"Pretty Noose"	Soundgarden	
3 June	Volume 63, No. 16	"Pretty Noose"	Soundgarden	
10 June	Volume 63, No. 17	"Pretty Noose"	Soundgarden	
17 June	Volume 63, No. 18	"One More Astronaut"	I Mother Earth	
24 June	Volume 63, No. 19	"Pretty Noose"	Soundgarden	
1 July	Volume 63, No. 20	"Pretty Noose"	Soundgarden	
8 July	Volume 63, No. 21	"Pretty Noose"	Soundgarden	
15 July	Volume 63, No. 22	"Trippin' on a Hole in a Paper Heart"	Stone Temple Pilots	
22 July	Volume 63, No. 23	"Trippin' on a Hole in a Paper Heart"	Stone Temple Pilots	
29 July	Volume 63, No. 24	"Trippin' on a Hole in a Paper Heart"	Stone Temple Pilots	
5 August	Volume 63, No. 25	"Trippin' on a Hole in a Paper Heart"	Stone Temple Pilots	
12 August	Volume 63, No. 26	"Burden in My Hand"	Soundgarden	
19 August	Volume 64, No. 1	"Burden in My Hand"	Soundgarden	
26 August	Volume 64, No. 2	"Burden in My Hand"	Soundgarden	
2 September	Volume 64, No. 3	On-line chart not available		(Note: This chart for 2 September Volume 64, No. 3 is not available from Library and Archives Canada.)
9 September	Volume 64, No. 4	"Who You Are"	Pearl Jam	
16 September	Volume 64, No. 5	"Standing Outside a Broken Phone Booth with Money in My Hand"	Primitive Radio Gods	
23 September	Volume 64, No. 6	"E-bow the Letter"	R.E.M.	
30 September	Volume 64, No. 7	"If It Makes You Happy"	Sheryl Crow	
7 October	Volume 64, No. 8	"Novocaine for the Soul"	Eels	
14 October	Volume 64, No. 9	"Novocaine for the Soul"	Eels	
21 October	Volume 64, No. 10	"Muzzle"	The Smashing Pumpkins	
4 November	Volume 64, No. 11	"Aneurysm"	Nirvana	
11 November	Volume 64, No. 13	"Aneurysm"	Nirvana	
18 November	Volume 64, No. 14	"Aneurysm"	Nirvana	
25 November	Volume 64, No. 15	"Stinkfist"	Tool	
2 December	Volume 64, No. 16	"Swallowed"	Bush X	
9 December	Volume 64, No. 17	"Swallowed"	Bush X	
16 December	Volume 64, No. 18	"Swallowed"	Bush X	
RPM's number-one Alternative rock single of 1996
16 December	Volume 64, No. 18	"Burden in My Hand"	Soundgarden	

== See also ==
- List of number-one singles in Canada
