= Thank You (Stone Temple Pilots album) =

Greatest hits album by Stone Temple Pilots
- Released: November 11, 2003
- Recorded: 1992–2002
- Genres: Alternative rock; grunge; hard rock
- Length: 58:29
- Label: Atlantic
- Producers: Stone Temple Pilots, Brendan O'Brien

Stone Temple Pilots chronology
Shangri-La Dee Da (2001)	Thank You (2003)	Stone Temple Pilots (2010)

Singles from Thank You
- 1. "All in the Suit That You Wear" Released: October 18, 2003

Professional ratings
Review scores
Source	Rating
AllMusic	4.5/5 stars
Blender	3/5 stars
Encyclopedia of Popular Music	4/5 stars
Rolling Stone	4/5 stars
The Rolling Stone Album Guide	3.5/5 stars
Spin	B

Thank You is a greatest hits album of American rock band Stone Temple Pilots. It was released on November 11, 2003, through Atlantic Records. The album has sold over 500,000 copies and features most of the band's singles.

== Overview ==
There are two versions of the compilation, one that only contains a music CD and another that also features a DVD with live performances, bootlegs (including a performance of the Aerosmith song "Sweet Emotion" with Steven Tyler and Joe Perry), and music videos spanning the band's career.

== Release and reception ==
Two singles were released from the album, an acoustic cover of "Plush" and a new song, "All in the Suit That You Wear". The band's final single before their break-up, it was intended for the soundtrack of 2002 film Spider-Man. However, Chad Kroeger and Josey Scott's song "Hero" was chosen instead.

Thank You was called "nearly perfect" by AllMusic's Stephen Erlewine, who wrote that "STP made music that sounded great at the time and even better now" and that the band's music had "stood the test of time." Rolling Stone gave the compilation album 4 out of 5 stars.

== Big Bang Babies ==
An earlier greatest hits album, to be titled Big Bang Babies, was planned for an October 2000 release. In addition to twelve of the band's biggest numbers, the album was to feature four new songs, including "Heed the Water Whisperer", "The Way She Moves" and "You Can't Drive Me Away". STP planned to record the new material in New York with producer Brendan O'Brien in mid-2000.

== Track listing ==
Thank You track listing
No.	Title	Writer(s)	Original album	Length
1.	"Vasoline"	Weiland; D. DeLeo; R. DeLeo; Kretz	Purple (1994)	2:57
2.	"Down"	Weiland; R. DeLeo	No. 4 (1999)	3:50
3.	"Wicked Garden"	Weiland; D. DeLeo; R. DeLeo	Core (1992)	4:07
4.	"Big Empty"	Weiland; D. DeLeo	Purple (1994)	4:55
5.	"Plush"	Weiland; R. DeLeo; Kretz	Core (1992)	5:13
6.	"Big Bang Baby"	Weiland; R. DeLeo	Tiny Music... Songs from the Vatican Gift Shop (1996)	3:24
7.	"Creep"	Weiland; R. DeLeo	Core (1992)	5:34
8.	"Lady Picture Show"	Weiland; R. DeLeo	Tiny Music... Songs from the Vatican Gift Shop (1996)	4:08
9.	"Trippin' on a Hole in a Paper Heart"	Weiland; Kretz	Tiny Music... Songs from the Vatican Gift Shop (1996)	2:57
10.	"Interstate Love Song"	Weiland; R. DeLeo	Purple (1994)	3:15
11.	"All in the Suit That You Wear"	Weiland; D. DeLeo; R. DeLeo; Kretz	Previously unreleased (2003)	3:41
12.	"Sex Type Thing"	Weiland; D. DeLeo; Kretz	Core (1992)	3:40
13.	"Days of the Week"	Weiland; D. DeLeo	Shangri-La Dee Da (2001)	2:37
14.	"Sour Girl"	Weiland; D. DeLeo	No. 4 (1999)	4:18
15.	"Plush" (acoustic, recorded live on MTV's Headbangers Ball, 1992)	Weiland; R. DeLeo; Kretz	B-side of "Sex Type Thing" (1993)	3:50
16.	"Long Way Home" (recorded live at Rolling Rock Town Fair 2001, bonus track on some editions)	Weiland; D. DeLeo	Shangri-La Dee Da (2001)	4:51
Total length:				58:29

== Personnel ==
- Eric Kretz – drums
- Robert DeLeo – bass
- Scott Weiland – vocals
- Dean DeLeo – guitar

== Charts ==
Chart performance for Thank You
Chart (2003–2025)	Peak position
Canadian Albums (Billboard)	44
Croatian International Albums (HDU)	38
US Billboard 200	26

== Certifications ==
Region	Certification	Certified units/sales
Australia (ARIA)	Gold	35,000^{^}
New Zealand (RMNZ)	Gold	7,500^{‡}
United Kingdom (BPI)	Silver	60,000^{‡}
^{^} Shipments figures based on certification alone.^{‡} Sales+streaming figures based on certification alone.
