= Blood on the Face =

Studio album by Grenouer
- Released: 3 May 2013
- Recorded: 2012–2013
- Genre: Alternative metal
- Length: 43:05
- Label: Mausoleum

Grenouer chronology
Lifelong Days (2008)	Blood on the Face (2013)

Blood on the Face is the seventh studio album by Russian metal band Grenouer. It was released on 3 May 2013 in Europe and 24 June 2013 in the United States through Mausoleum Records.

== Cover ==
The cover was created by Didier Scohier/artcore design, who had previously worked with bands like Cinderella and Raven Lord.

== Reception ==
Reviewer Martell of "We Löve Metal" commented, "Grenouer has changed their sound in a very mainstream oriented direction that can obtain mass appeal. The music is good and will be appreciated. But…when you keep a name with a history; your fans expect a certain things to come out of their speakers. In the case of Grenouer’s “Blood on the Face” their old fans are going to be shocked at the sharp turn the band has taken. They aren't blatantly selling themselves as death metal, but with the name comes the past and their past is death."

== Track listing ==
All tracks are written by Grenouer except where noted.

Blood on the Face track listing
No.	Title	Writer(s)	Length
1.	"Intro: Thunder Phase"		0:39
2.	"Blood on the Face"		3:28
3.	"Sands of Silence"		3:43
4.	"Midday Show"		3:50
5.	"Golden Years"		3:32
6.	"Rejected"		4:13
7.	"Fix Your Life/A Few Miles from Paradise"		3:51
8.	"The Taste of Misery"		3:52
9.	"Brain Fever"		3:41
10.	"See No Sun"		3:30
11.	"Last Stop"		4:48
12.	"All in the Suit That You Wear"	Dean DeLeo; Robert DeLeo; Eric Kretz; Scott Weiland	3:58
Total length:			43:05

== Personnel ==
=== Grenouer ===
- Andrey "Ind" – vocals
- Alexander "Motor" – lead guitar
- Igor "Buzzy" – guitar
- Dmitry "Daemon" – bass
- Michael "Coroner" – drums

=== Production ===
- Dualized (mixing, sound design)
- Eddy Cavazza (keyboards, sound design)
- Anssi Kippo (keyboards, bass, producer)
- Joonas Koto
