= Rhinosaur =

1997 song by Soundgarden

Song by Soundgarden

from the album Down on the Upside
- A-side: "Ty Cobb"
- Released: April 1997
- Genre: Grunge
- Length: 3:14
- Label: A&M
- Composer: Matt Cameron
- Lyricist: Chris Cornell
- Producers: Adam Kasper, Soundgarden

"Rhinosaur" is a song by American rock band Soundgarden on their 1996 album Down on the Upside. Despite not being released as its own single it was released as a B-side to the song "Ty Cobb". While "Ty Cobb" itself did not chart, "Rhinosaur" charted at 19 on the Mainstream Rock Tracks.

== Reception ==
Chris Cornell said in an interview that the lyrical target of "Rhinosaur" was ambiguous and could be applied to several people or groups. "Rhinosaur" was praised for having a massive groove with "stairstep guitar riffs" said to be adored by Soundgarden's guitarist Kim Thayil. Thayil said that the tuning of the instruments was unusual for Soundgarden. He said during an interview "Ben and I played on dropped-D, but Chris played in standard tuning. That's unusual for us. If one of us is in dropped-D, usually all three of us are." The song also received moderate airplay by rock radio stations in America.

== Personnel ==
- Chris Cornell – vocals, rhythm guitar
- Kim Thayil – lead guitar
- Ben Shepherd – bass guitar
- Matt Cameron – drums, percussion

== Charts ==
Chart (1997)	Peak position
US Mainstream Rock (Billboard)	19
