= Dancing Days =

1973 single by Led Zeppelin

- Netherlands single picture sleeve

Single by Led Zeppelin

from the album Houses of the Holy
- A-side: "Over the Hills and Far Away"
- Released: 24 May 1973 (US)
- Recorded: 1972
- Studio: Stargroves, East Woodhay, England
- Genre: Hard rock; boogie rock
- Length: 3:40
- Label: Atlantic
- Songwriters: Jimmy Page; Robert Plant
- Producer: Jimmy Page

Led Zeppelin singles chronology
"Rock and Roll" (1972)	"Dancing Days" (1973)	"D'yer Mak'er" (1973)

Audio sample
- file; help

"Dancing Days" is a song by English rock band Led Zeppelin. It appears on their 1973 album, Houses of the Holy, and was released as a single in the US. It was recorded at Stargroves, England in 1972. It was inspired by an Indian tune that Jimmy Page and Robert Plant heard while traveling in Bombay. This was the first track from the album to be offered for radio play by Atlantic Records. It was premiered on 24 March 1973 on the BBC Radio One Rosko lunch time show.

== Live performances ==
As with the single's A-side, "Over the Hills and Far Away", "Dancing Days" was introduced by the band in concert well ahead of its commercial release. The earliest live documented reference is in Seattle on 19 June 1972 where the song was performed twice: once during the main set and again as an encore; it was then performed frequently during the rest of this tour, with a version appearing on the live album, How the West Was Won. With the release of Houses of the Holy, however, "Dancing Days" was largely dropped from concerts, although an abridged, acoustic version was occasionally performed during the 1977 U.S. tour. A full electric version was played as an encore on 13 July 1973 at Cobo Hall, Detroit, Michigan as featured on the "Monsters of Rock" bootleg.

== Critical reception ==
In a contemporary review for Houses of the Holy, Gordon Fletcher of Rolling Stone gave "Dancing Days" a negative review, calling the track nothing but a piece of "filler".

== Personnel ==
According to the Houses of the Holy liner notes.

- Robert Plant – vocals
- Jimmy Page – guitars
- John Paul Jones – bass, organ
- John Bonham – drums

== Stone Temple Pilots version ==
"Dancing Days"
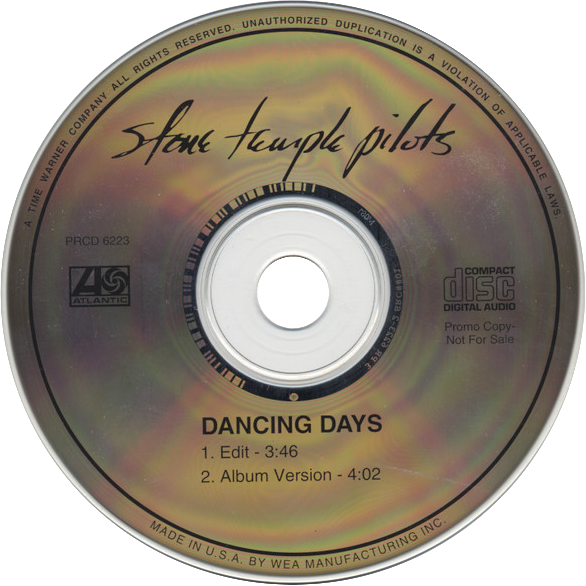
- US promotional CD single

Promotional single by Stone Temple Pilots

from the album Encomium: A Tribute to Led Zeppelin
- B-side: "Dancing Days (Album Version)"
- Released: May 16, 1995
- Recorded: 1995
- Studio: Stargroves, East Woodhay, England
- Genre: Alternative rock; acoustic rock; grunge
- Length: 3:46
- Label: Atlantic
- Songwriters: Jimmy Page; Robert Plant

Stone Temple Pilots promotional single chronology
"Pretty Penny" (1995)	"Dancing Days" (1995)	"Tumble in the Rough" (1997)

American rock band Stone Temple Pilots recorded an acoustic cover of "Dancing Days" for the tribute album, Encomium: A Tribute to Led Zeppelin (1995). Their version is a grunge and alternative rock song, with elements of swing, an example of the DeLeo brother's jazz influences. Atlantic Records serviced the song to contemporary hit radio on May 16, 1995, and peaked at No. 63 on the US Billboard Hot 100 Airplay chart.

The band repurposed the chorus riff on ''Trippin' on a Hole in a Paper Heart", a song and second single from their third studio album, Tiny Music... Songs from the Vatican Gift Shop (1996).

=== Release ===
A promotional single of "Dancing Days", shortened to three minutes and 46 seconds, was released in 1995, with the four minute and two second album version as the B-side. The single was manufactured by WEA Manufacturing, made by Specialty Records, and issued with a black and white printed tray card, but no front insert.

While not entering the US Hot 100, the song reached No. 63 on Hot 100 Airplay, No. 11 on Alternative Airplay, No. 3 on Mainstream Rock and No. 46 on the Canada Top Singles chart.

=== Critical reception ===
Ryan Burleson of Magnet praised the cover for its faithfulness to the original, opining that the song almost sounded like a Stone Temple Pilots original. According to him, this was not surprising, as the band frequently cited Led Zeppelin as an influence, and had the same record label, Atlantic.

=== Legacy ===
"Dancing Days" was remastered and rereleased on 13 September 2019 as one of 12 bonus tracks on the 25th anniversary remaster of the band's second studio album, Purple. Stone Temple Pilots reused the chorus riff from their version of the song on "Trippin' on a Hole in a Paper Heart", a song and second single from the band's third studio album, Tiny Music... Songs from the Vatican Gift Shop, and released on 3 August 1996.

Howard Stern uploaded a video in January 2019 of the band performing the song on The Howard Stern Show, in 1996. The video had never been uploaded to the internet, and only the audio was previously available online. Howard says at the end, "you sons of bitches can really do it, I like it."

=== Track listing ===
All tracks are written by Jimmy Page and Robert Plant.

No.	Title	Length
1.	"Dancing Days" (Edit)	3:46
2.	"Dancing Days" (Album Version)	4:02
Total length:		7:48

=== Charts ===
Chart (1995)	Peak position
Canada Top Singles (RPM)	46
US Hot 100 Airplay (Billboard)	63
US Alternative Airplay (Billboard)	11
US Mainstream Rock (Billboard)	3

== See also ==
- List of cover versions of Led Zeppelin songs – "Dancing Days" entries

== Bibliography ==
- Guesdon, Jean-Michel; Margotin, Philippe (2018). Led Zeppelin All the Songs: The Story Behind Every Track. Running Press. ISBN 978-0-316-448-67-3.
