= Ty Cobb (song) =

Single by Soundgarden

from the album Down on the Upside
- B-side: "Rhinosaur" "Big Dumb Sex"
- Released: April 1997 (AUS)
- Genre: Punk rock
- Length: 3:05
- Label: A&M
- Composer: Ben Shepherd
- Lyricist: Chris Cornell
- Producers: Adam Kasper; Soundgarden

Soundgarden singles chronology
"Blow Up the Outside World" (1996)	"Ty Cobb" (1997)	"Bleed Together" (1997)

"Ty Cobb" is a song by the American rock band Soundgarden. Featuring lyrics written by frontman Chris Cornell and music written by bassist Ben Shepherd, "Ty Cobb" was released in April 1997 as the fourth single from the band's fifth studio album, Down on the Upside (1996). The song was included on Soundgarden's 1997 greatest hits album, A-Sides.

== Origin and recording ==
"Ty Cobb" features lyrics written by frontman Chris Cornell and music written by bassist Ben Shepherd. Cornell and Shepherd play mandolin and mandola on the track. Cornell on the song:

Well, Ben actually had the idea that he wanted to hear mandolin on that song, and so we called some people and they brought like, these older mandolins down for us to try, 'cause they thought they were really great, and then we picked them up and just played 'em, and that was about it, the first time we ever played them.

== Composition ==
"Ty Cobb" is a punk rock song, beginning with a quiet, 22-second intro before acquiring a frenetic pace throughout the rest of the song. Guitarist Kim Thayil said, "'Ty Cobb' sounds like it may fall apart at any second but it remains intact. That is an element that a lot of rock bands neglected. But punk rock has always had that element of barely being able to hold on to the steering wheel."

== Lyrics ==
"Ty Cobb" was originally titled "Hot Rod Death Toll", but the lyrics reminded Shepherd of the infamous baseball player Ty Cobb. He broke many records and still holds the all-time career batting average record (.366), but acquired a reputation for racism, violence, and alcoholism, largely due to now-discredited books and articles by controversial writer Al Stump.

Cornell said to Kerrang! about writing the song,

It was basically coming from the frame of mind of some sort of hardcore pissed-off idiot, and that's why we titled it that. We weren't writing the song about Ty Cobb at all—I didn't even know anything about him. I was just thinking of a character who was a combination of a lot of people I've met and didn't like.

== Release and reception ==
Although "Ty Cobb" did not chart on the Billboard Hot 100, the Billboard Mainstream Rock chart, or the Billboard Modern Rock Tracks chart as the first three singles from Down on the Upside did, its B-side, "Rhinosaur", also from the album, did chart on the Mainstream Rock chart at No. 19. Outside the United States, the single was released commercially in Australia. It also contained a remix of "Rhinosaur" called "The Straw That Broke the Rhino's Back" which was created by Bill Rieflin. David Browne of Entertainment Weekly said, "With its frenetic mandolin, "Ty Cobb" ... is something like metal bluegrass."

== Track listing ==
All songs written by Matt Cameron and Chris Cornell, except where noted:

1. "Ty Cobb" (Cornell, Ben Shepherd) – 3:05
2. "Rhinosaur" – 3:14
3. "Big Dumb Sex" (Cornell) – 4:11
4. "Rhinosaur" (The Straw That Broke the Rhino's Back remix) – 3:43

== Personnel ==
- Chris Cornell – vocals, rhythm guitar, mandolin, mandola
- Kim Thayil – lead guitar
- Ben Shepherd – bass guitar, mandolin, mandola, intro instrumentation
- Matt Cameron – drums, percussion
