= Down on the Upside =

Studio album by Soundgarden
- Released: May 21, 1996
- Recorded: November 1995 – February 1996
- Studios: Studio Litho (Seattle, Washington); Bad Animals (Seattle, Washington)
- Genres: Alternative rock; grunge
- Length: 65:56
- Label: A&M
- Producers: Adam Kasper; Soundgarden

Soundgarden chronology
Superunknown (1994)	Down on the Upside (1996)	A-Sides (1997)

Singles from Down on the Upside
- 1. "Pretty Noose" Released: May 7, 1996; 2. "Burden in My Hand" Released: September 16, 1996; 3. "Blow Up the Outside World" Released: December 16, 1996; 4. "Ty Cobb" Released: April 1997 (Aus)

Down on the Upside is the fifth studio album by the American rock band Soundgarden, released on May 21, 1996, through A&M Records. Following a worldwide tour in support of its previous album, Superunknown (1994), Soundgarden commenced work on a new album. Self-produced by the band, the music on the album was notably less heavy and dark than the group's preceding albums and featured the band experimenting with new sounds.

The album topped the New Zealand and Australian charts and debuted at number two on the United States' Billboard 200, selling 175,500 copies in its opening week and spawning the singles "Pretty Noose", "Burden in My Hand", "Blow Up the Outside World", and "Ty Cobb". The band played the 1996 Lollapalooza tour and, afterward, supported the album with a worldwide tour.

Down on the Upside was Soundgarden's last studio album until 2012's King Animal, as tensions within the band led to its break-up in April 1997. The album has sold 1.6 million copies in the United States.

== Recording ==
Recording sessions for the album took place between November 1995 and February 1996 at Studio Litho and Bad Animals Studio in Seattle, Washington. Studio Litho is owned by Pearl Jam guitarist Stone Gossard. The members of Soundgarden produced the album themselves. On the decision to work without an outside producer, frontman Chris Cornell stated that "a fifth guy is too many cooks and convolutes everything. It has to go down too many mental roads, which dilutes it." Drummer Matt Cameron added that, while working with Michael Beinhorn on Superunknown yielded excellent results, it was "a little more of a struggle than it needed to be", and self-production would accelerate the process. Adam Kasper, who previously worked with Soundgarden as an assistant engineer on Superunknown, collaborated with the band as a co-producer and mixed the album.

Work on the album began in July 1995. The band paused to perform at several European festivals, where they road-tested the new material. Afterward, the group spent about a month writing additional material before tracking the majority of the album at Studio Litho. The overall approach to songwriting was less collaborative than on previous efforts, as individual band members brought in songs that were more fully realized. The band sought to explore unfamiliar territory and utilize a wider variety of material. They aimed to capture a live atmosphere for the album, deliberately retaining sonic textures that producers typically remove, such as audio feedback and out-of-tune guitar parts. The overall time spent working on the album was less than what the band had spent working on Superunknown. Cornell described the album-making process as "way faster and way easier". Most of the material was written by Cornell and bassist Ben Shepherd, with Shepherd having contributed to six of the album's sixteen tracks. Reportedly, tensions within the group arose during the recording sessions, as guitarist Kim Thayil and Cornell allegedly clashed over the latter's desire to shift away from the heavy guitar riffing that had become the band's trademark.

Thayil's sole songwriting contribution to the album was "Never the Machine Forever", for which he wrote both the lyrics and the music; it was also the final song recorded for the sessions. The track initially grew out of a jam session Thayil shared with Seattle drummer Greg Gilmore. In the liner notes, Thayil credited Gilmore for inspiring the song. He stated that he had numerous incomplete musical ideas that lacked lyrics or arrangements, which prevented them from making the final track listing. Thayil noted: "It can be a little bit discouraging if there isn't satisfactory creative input, but on the other hand, I write all the solo bits and don't really have limitations on the parts I come up with for guitar." Cornell reflected: "By the time we were finished, it felt like it had been kind of hard, like it was a long, hard haul. But there was stuff we were discovering."

== Outtakes ==
Various versions of the "Burden in My Hand" single featured two B-sides from the Down on the Upside recording sessions that were not included on the album: "Karaoke" and "Bleed Together". "Bleed Together" was included on the band's 1997 greatest hits compilation, A-Sides, and was released as a promo CD single in 1997. Thayil noted the song was not included on Down on the Upside because the band was not pleased with its mix and already had a sufficient amount of material for the album.

Another song that was written and recorded for the album is "Kristi", which Cameron has called one of his favorite Soundgarden tracks. "Kristi" was eventually mixed in 2014 and included on the compilation box set Echo of Miles: Scattered Tracks Across the Path, along with both "Karaoke" and "Bleed Together".

== Music and lyrics ==
"Burden in My Hand"
Among the album's many sonic experiments is the single "Burden in My Hand", which bears a "blues-tinged, country twang".

Down on the Upside continues the band's musical development away from alt-metal to a more experimental sound, described as alternative rock and grunge. The album's songs placed emphasis on vocals and melody over the heavy guitar riffs that were found on the band's earlier LPs. It also features a rawer sound than Soundgarden's previous album Superunknown, as the band members produced the record themselves. Cornell summed up the changes by saying: "What we've lost in sonic precision we've gained so much in terms of feeling." Stephen Thomas Erlewine of AllMusic noted that Soundgarden "retained their ambitious song structures, neo-psychedelic guitar textures, and winding melodies but haven't dressed them up with detailed production." The songs vary in tempo throughout the course of the album, with Thayil describing the album as having a "dual nature". He stated, "It keeps listeners on their toes and lets them know they're not getting the same album over and over." Shepherd called the album "the most accurate picture of what Soundgarden actually sounds like", stating: "It's way more raw. It's way more honest. It's way more 'responsible.'"

The band stated at the time that it wanted to experiment with other sounds, which included Shepherd and Cornell playing mandolin and mandola on the song "Ty Cobb". This experimentation can be heard to a lesser degree on Superunknown. Soundgarden used alternative tunings and odd time signatures on several of the album's songs. For example, "Never the Machine Forever" uses a time signature of 9/8. "Pretty Noose" and "Burden in My Hand" were written in C-G-C-G-G-E tuning.

The overall mood of the album's lyrics is not as dark as on previous Soundgarden albums. Cornell even admitted "Dusty" was "pretty positive for a Soundgarden song", describing it as an opposite to the previous album's "Fell On Black Days". According to Cornell, "Pretty Noose" is about "an attractively packaged bad idea", and "Ty Cobb" is about a "hardcore pissed-off idiot". Cornell said the songs "Never Named" and "Boot Camp" are based on his childhood. Thayil said the lyrics for "Never the Machine Forever" are about "a life-and-death match between an individual and a less specifically defined entity". Cornell referred to "Overfloater" as "self-affirming".

== Packaging ==
The album's cover art, photographed by Kevin Westenberg, features the band members in silhouette. At one point, a photograph of caterpillars eating a tomato—which was ultimately used for the "Blow Up the Outside World" single—was considered for the cover of Down on the Upside. The album was also released as a limited edition that included the Into the Upside interview bonus disc.

The title Down on the Upside comes from a line in the song "Dusty". The lyric states, "I think it's turning back on me/I'm down on the upside". Cornell noted that the title represents the varied musical textures found across the album. In an interview, he explained how the name was selected:

"I brought it up at some point because the song that the title came from was 'Dusty', but my title for it was 'Down on the Upside', but Ben wrote the music and he called it 'Dusty'. So since we don't really like having song titles being the title of the record, 'cause it brings this weird, undue focus to the song, I thought it would be cool to call it Down on the Upside. We started thinking about all these other titles, and worrying about them describing the whole record without excluding anything ... So it was the last minute and we were at a photo shoot for Spin and someone called and said, 'We need your title now so we can start doing the record package,' so Matt [Cameron] brought up the title again, and everyone went, 'yeah, that's it.'"

— Chris Cornell

During a promotional interview, Cameron and Shepherd jokingly claimed that two alternative titles considered for the album were Mr. Bunchy Pants and Comin' At Ya!

== Release and reception ==
Professional ratings
Review scores
Source	Rating
AllMusic	3/5 stars
Chicago Tribune	3/4 stars
Entertainment Weekly	B+
The Guardian	2/5 stars
Los Angeles Times	3.5/4 stars
NME	3/10
Pitchfork	7.0/10
Rolling Stone	3/5 stars
Spin	8/10
USA Today	3/4 stars

Down on the Upside received a 10,000-copy limited edition vinyl release on May 14, 1996, one week prior to its main release on CD and cassette. It debuted at number two on the Billboard 200 album chart with 175,500 units sold, behind only The Score by the Fugees. The album has sold 1.6 million copies in the United States and has been certified Platinum by the RIAA.

Ivan Kreilkamp of Spin gave the album an eight out of ten, saying the album is "as sprawling and generous-spirited as Superunknown, but ... is a looser and live-er-sounding affair, not seeking the same level of aural precision". Alternative Press gave the album a three out of five, saying Soundgarden are "now fully capable of penning some damned spiffy pop songs", and adding that "they sound more human here, like they're playing in your living room". Rolling Stone staff writer David Fricke gave Down on the Upside three out of five stars, observing that the album has "some quality frenzy", but criticizing it for "lack[ing] defining episodes of catharsis", and saying: "Soundgarden seem to be digging in their heels rather than kicking up dirt, relying too much on drone-y impressionism and clever (as opposed to cleaving) guitar motifs." Neil Strauss of The New York Times called the album the "rawer, looser follow-up to Superunknown", adding: "Generally, identifying with animals in song lyrics is a sign of low self-esteem, and Soundgarden is no exception. For all the virility and macho power that rock singers have tried to wring from the [snake], Soundgarden remains more interested in the fact that it is the only animal cursed to spend its days slithering on the ground."

David Browne of Entertainment Weekly gave the album a B+, saying: "Few bands since Led Zeppelin have so crisply mixed instruments both acoustic and electric." He praised several songs as being "as powerful as anything the band has done", but criticized the album's production, saying that, "like many self-produced efforts, it shows." He added: "With arrangements that crest and fall to the point where a road map would have helped, the overlong (16-song) album is often unwieldy and could have benefited from judicious trimming." AllMusic staff writer Stephen Thomas Erlewine gave the album three out of five stars, saying that "it might seem like nothing more than heavy metal, but a closer listen reveals that Soundgarden haven't tempered their ambitions at all." The reviewer for Melody Maker said that "their roots don't matter now. All I care for now is the immediacy of their pop moments." Critic Robert Christgau gave the album a one-star honorable mention, describing it as "brutal depression simplified" and highlighting the tracks "Ty Cobb" and "Applebite", while Jason Josephes of Pitchfork called it a "double shot of grunge, no foam but plenty of caffeine." A negative review came from Johnny Cigarettes of NME, who rated the album 3/10 and noted: "Throughout this record the mood of dark, demon-wrestling introspection continually rings hollow ... the lack of gut-level resonance [Soundgarden] create reveals all this as mere dark stylistics, the modern equivalent of a scary monster on an Iron Maiden T-shirt."

The album included the singles "Pretty Noose", "Burden in My Hand", and "Blow Up the Outside World", all of which had accompanying music videos. All three singles placed on the Mainstream Rock and Modern Rock charts. The album's other commercially released single, "Ty Cobb", did not chart, however its accompanying B-side, "Rhinosaur", also from the album, did chart. "Burden in My Hand" was the most successful song from Down on the Upside on the rock charts, spending a total of five weeks at number one on the Mainstream Rock charts and reaching number two on the Modern Rock charts. At the 1997 Grammy Awards, "Pretty Noose" received a nomination for Best Hard Rock Performance.

== Tour ==
The band played the 1996 Lollapalooza tour with Metallica, who had insisted on Soundgarden's appearance on the tour. Thayil said the band wasn't interested in doing the tour until it became a "Metallica tour". During the Lollapalooza tour, the band members reportedly took separate flights and then met at the gigs.

After Lollapalooza, the band embarked on a worldwide tour, supported by Moby. Tensions continued to increase and, when asked if the band hated touring, Cornell said: "We really enjoy it to a point and then it gets tedious, because it becomes repetitious. You feel like fans have paid their money and they expect you to come out and play them your songs like the first time you ever played them. That's the point where we hate touring." The band was criticized for its lack of energy while performing. Cornell said that "after a number of years, you start to feel like you're acting. All those people who criticize us for not jumping around should shut the fuck up, and when they come to our shows they should jump around and entertain us for a while." Thayil had an issue with how the band's audience had changed, stating that "nowadays, you also have the kids and the housewives, the casual fans. With your casual fans, you say, 'Thanks for the money.' And they say, 'Thanks for the song.'" The band's concerts in December 1996 were postponed for a week due to Cornell's throat problems.

At the final stop of the tour, in Honolulu, Hawaii, on February 9, 1997, Shepherd threw his bass into the air in frustration after suffering equipment failure, and subsequently stormed off the stage. The band retreated, and Cornell returned alone to conclude the show with a solo encore. On April 9, 1997, the band announced its disbanding. Thayil said, "It was pretty obvious from everybody's general attitude over the course of the previous half year that there was some dissatisfaction." Cameron later said that Soundgarden was "eaten up by the business".

== Track listing ==
All lyrics are written by Chris Cornell, except where noted.

Down on the Upside
No.	Title	Lyrics	Music	Length
1.	"Pretty Noose"		Cornell	4:12
2.	"Rhinosaur"		Matt Cameron	3:14
3.	"Zero Chance"		Ben Shepherd	4:18
4.	"Dusty"		Shepherd	4:34
5.	"Ty Cobb"		Shepherd	3:05
6.	"Blow Up the Outside World"		Cornell	5:46
7.	"Burden in My Hand"		Cornell	4:50
8.	"Never Named"		Shepherd	2:28
9.	"Applebite"		Cameron	5:10
10.	"Never the Machine Forever"	Kim Thayil	Thayil	3:36
11.	"Tighter & Tighter"		Cornell	6:06
12.	"No Attention"		Cornell	4:27
13.	"Switch Opens"		Shepherd	3:53
14.	"Overfloater"		Cornell	5:09
15.	"An Unkind"	Shepherd	Shepherd	2:08
16.	"Boot Camp"		Cornell	2:59
Total length:				65:56

== Personnel ==
Soundgarden

- Chris Cornell – vocals, rhythm guitar; mandolin and mandola ("Ty Cobb"), Rhodes piano ("Overfloater")
- Kim Thayil – lead guitar
- Ben Shepherd – bass guitar; mandolin, mandola and intro instrumentation ("Ty Cobb")
- Matt Cameron – drums, percussion; Moog synthesizer ("Applebite")

Additional musicians

- Adam Kasper – piano ("Applebite"), co-production, engineering, mixing

Artwork

- Ben Marra Studios – "cinema" photography
- Helix creative inc, Seattle – art direction and design
- Ben Shepherd – back CD photo
- Kevin Westenberg – photography

Production

- Matt Bayles, Sam Hofstedt – assistant engineering
- John Burton – additional tracking assistance
- Tom Smurdon – additional tracking assistance
- David Collins – mastering at A&M Mastering Studios, Hollywood, CA
- Gregg Keplinger – drum technician
- Darrell Peters – guitar technician
- Soundgarden – production, mixing

== Charts ==
=== Weekly charts ===
Chart (1996–2025)	Peak position
Australian Albums (ARIA)	1
Austrian Albums (Ö3 Austria)	12
Belgian Albums (Ultratop Flanders)	18
Belgian Albums (Ultratop Wallonia)	19
Canada Albums (The Record)	2
Danish Albums (Hitlisten)	15
Dutch Albums (Album Top 100)	12
Estonia Albums (Eesti Top 10)	8
Europe (European Top 100 Albums)	6
Finnish Albums (Suomen virallinen lista)	4
French Albums (SNEP)	12
German Albums (Offizielle Top 100)	15
Greek Albums (IFPI)	45
Hungary Albums (MAHASZ)	34
Icelandic Albums (Tónlist)	3
Italian Albums (FIMI)	7
Japanese Albums (Oricon)	31
New Zealand Albums (RMNZ)	1
Norwegian Albums (VG-lista)	6
Portuguese Albums (AFP)	23
Scottish Albums (Official Charts)	11
Swedish Albums (Sverigetopplistan)	3
Swiss Albums (Schweizer Hitparade)	20
UK Albums (Official Charts)	7
UK Rock & Metal Albums (Official Charts)	1
US Billboard 200	2

Chart (2016)	Peak position
US Vinyl Albums (Billboard)	14

Chart (2017)	Peak position
US Top Catalog Albums (Billboard)	45
US Hard Rock Albums (Billboard)	14
US Top Rock Albums (Billboard)	39

=== Year-end charts ===
Chart (1996)	Position
Canada Top Albums/CDs (RPM)	40
European Albums (European Top 100 Albums)	93
New Zealand Albums (RMNZ)	20
Swedish Albums Chart	93
US Billboard 200	47

=== Singles ===
Year	Single	Peak chart positions										
Year	Single	US Air	US Main	US Mod	AUS	CAN	CAN Alt.	FIN	NZ	SWE	SWI	UK
1996	"Pretty Noose"	37	4	2	22	43	1	10	18	42	47	14
1996	"Burden in My Hand"	40	1	2	57	9	1	—	—	—	—	33
1996	"Blow Up the Outside World"	53	1	8	76	89	2	—	—	—	—	40
1997	"Ty Cobb"	—	—	—	—	—	—	—	—	—	—	—
1997	"Rhinosaur" (airplay)	—	19	—	—	—	—	—	—	—	—	—
"—" denotes singles that did not chart or were not released in that country.

== Certifications ==
Region	Certification	Certified units/sales
Australia (ARIA)	Platinum	70,000^{^}
Canada (Music Canada)	Platinum	100,000^{^}
New Zealand (RMNZ)	Platinum	15,000^{^}
United Kingdom (BPI)	Silver	60,000^{*}
United States (RIAA)	Platinum	1,000,000^{^}
^{*} Sales figures based on certification alone.^{^} Shipments figures based on certification alone.
