= Down by the Seaside =

Song by Led Zeppelin

from the album Physical Graffiti
- Released: 24 February 1975
- Recorded: February 1971
- Studio: Island Studios, London (Studio One)
- Genre: Country rock
- Length: 5:16
- Label: Swan Song
- Songwriters: Jimmy Page; Robert Plant
- Producer: Jimmy Page

"Down by the Seaside" is a ballad by the English rock band Led Zeppelin, featured on their sixth studio album Physical Graffiti (1975).

== Overview ==
The song was written as an acoustic piece by Jimmy Page and Robert Plant at Bron-Yr-Aur, the cottage in Wales where they went after their 1970 concert tours of North America. It was recorded in 1971 as an electric arrangement, intended for release on Led Zeppelin IV, but was held over and eventually placed on Physical Graffiti to complete the double album.

It has been speculated by fanzine writer Dave Lewis that the song was influenced by Neil Young. The song alternates between soft and hard-rocking sections and changes in tempo, with the lighter sections employing a tremolo effect on the guitar, or possibly by running it through a Leslie speaker, to give an 'underwater talking' feel. John Paul Jones plays a Hohner "Electra-Piano" electric piano on the track. "Down by the Seaside" was never performed live at Led Zeppelin concerts.

Plant later recorded "Down by the Seaside" as a duet with Tori Amos for the 1995 Led Zeppelin tribute album Encomium.

== Reception ==
Ultimate Classic Rock writer Michael Gallucci ranked "Down by the Seaside" at number 66 (out of 92) on their list of every Led Zeppelin song ranked. Another UCR writer, Eduardo Rivadavia, ranked the song the ninth best on the album, calling it a "wistful fantasy awash in trembling guitars and bluesy electric piano breakdowns."

Spin ranked the song at number 53 on their list of every Led Zeppelin song ranked, writing that "amidst the epic brutality of much of Graffiti, it's a highly welcome respite."

== Personnel ==
According to Jean-Michel Guesdon and Philippe Margotin:

- Robert Plant – vocals
- Jimmy Page – acoustic guitar, electric guitars
- John Paul Jones – bass, keyboard
- John Bonham – drums
