= Grenouer =

Russian rock and metal band

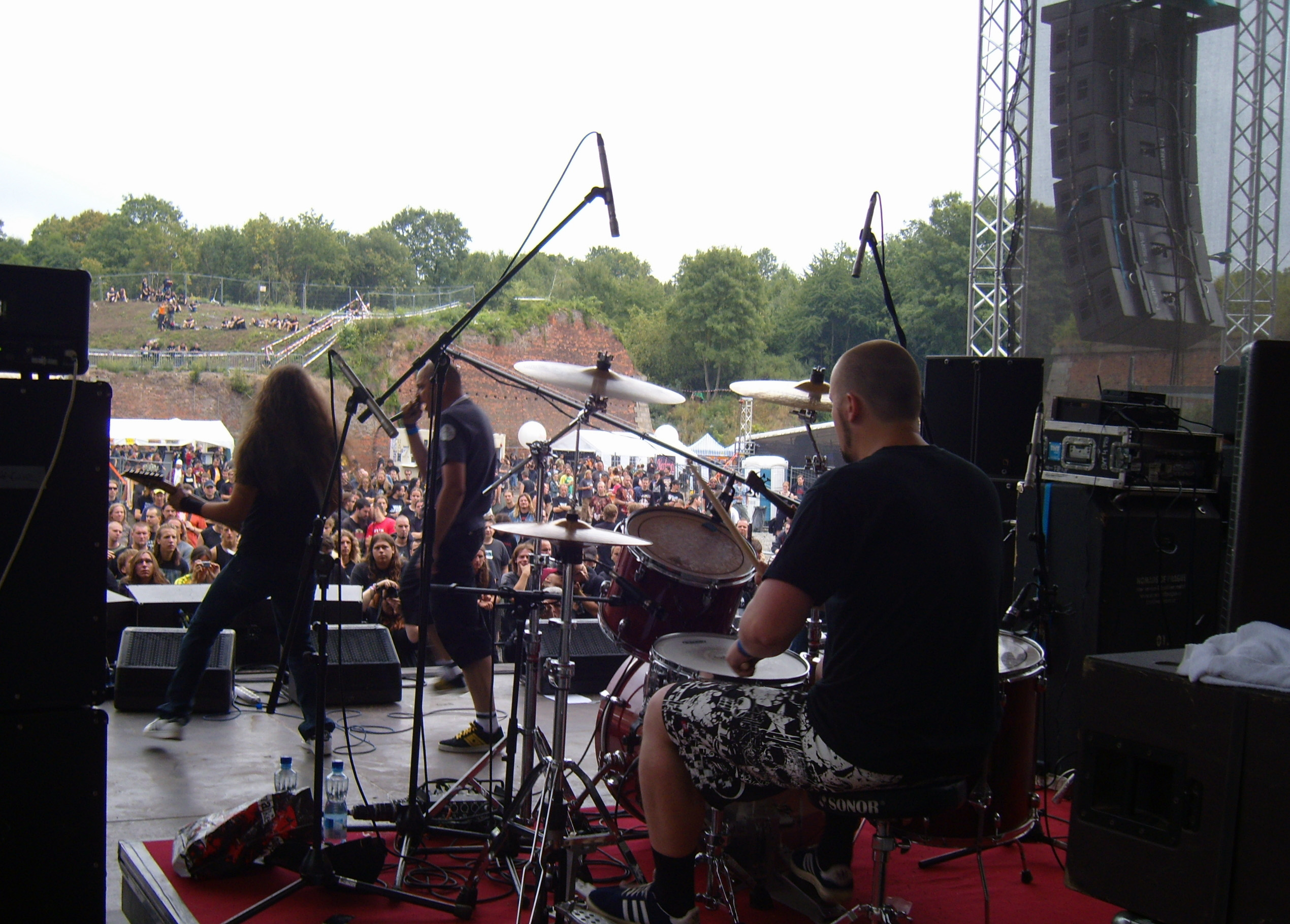

Background information
- Origin: Saint Petersburg, Russia
- Genres: Alternative metal; melodic death metal; progressive metal; djent
- Years active: 1992–present
- Label: Mausoleum
- Members: Ind; Motor; Buzzy; Danny; Daemon
- Website: grenouer.com

Grenouer is a Russian rock and metal band formed in Perm in late 1992. Their name intentionally misspells grimoire, a magic textbook.

== History ==
The debut was followed by other albums, released in Russia by labels like Irond, More Hate, Blacksmith Productions, and Metallism, refining their approach.

The third album, The Odour O' Folly, included a cover version of A-Ha's "Take On Me". The fourth album, Presence With War, dealt with the Iraq war. Mickmo, an American creator of comic books, designed the front cover. Steve Beebee wrote that Grenouer "is the most impressive metal statement from an unlikely source" in 2009, reviewing the album for Kerrang! and giving it a 4K-rating.

In the mid-2000s, Grenouer's music changed as musicians relocated to Saint Petersburg, shifting toward hardcore, math metal, and progressive rock. The fifth album, Try, was released worldwide in Great Britain by Casket Music (a division of Copro Records); it displayed these influences, though some brutal death metal fans felt Grenouer was betraying their ideals. In fact they were pioneering djent. In a retrospective, Kerrang!'s Ryan Bird wrote of Presence With War (released in 2009 in the UK), "Unforgiving to the end, this is metal at its most genuinely ferocious," in another 4K-rating review.

In 2008, the band released their sixth studio album, Lifelong Days, following their previous style. From 2013's Blood on the Face onward, they moved in a more melodic direction, permanently replacing harsh vocals with clean singing.

In 2021, past members formed Grenouer Inc. to return to their death metal roots. They released two singles in late 2023.

== Controversy ==
In 2004, the Mayor of Kemerovo banned Grenouer's concert the very same day they arrived at the city, allegedly for the advocacy of violence.

== Line-up ==
- Ind – vocals
- Motor – guitar
- Al Bolo – bass
- Danny D – drums

== Discography ==
- 1993 – Death of a Bite (demo)
- 1996 – Fiery Swans (EP)
- 1996 – Border of Misty Times
- 1999 – Gravehead
- 2001 – The Odour O'Folly
- 2004 – Presence With War
- 2005 – Try (EP)
- 2007 – Try
- 2008 – Lifelong Days
- 2011 – Computer Crime (EP)
- 2013 – Blood on the Face
- 2015 – Unwanted Today
- 2019 – Ambition 999
- 2022 – Paranoid Infinity (Single)
- 2022 – Mountain Sky (Single)
- 2023 – A Foe Within (Single)
