= Lady Picture Show =

1996 single by Stone Temple Pilots

Single by Stone Temple Pilots

from the album Tiny Music... Songs from the Vatican Gift Shop
- Released: October 22, 1996
- Studio: Westerly Ranch (Santa Ynez, California)
- Genre: Jangle pop; baroque pop
- Length: 4:06
- Label: Atlantic
- Composer: Robert DeLeo
- Lyricist: Scott Weiland
- Producer: Brendan O'Brien

Stone Temple Pilots singles chronology
"Trippin' on a Hole in a Paper Heart" (1996)	"Lady Picture Show" (1996)	"Down" (1999)

Audio sample
- file; help

Music video
- "Lady Picture Show" on YouTube

"Lady Picture Show" is a song by American alternative rock band Stone Temple Pilots. It was the third single released from their third album, Tiny Music... Songs from the Vatican Gift Shop, and became their third consecutive number-one single on the US Billboard Mainstream Rock Tracks chart. "Lady Picture Show" later appeared on the band's greatest hits album Thank You (2003).

== Lyrical content ==
Scott Weiland wrote in his autobiography, Not Dead and Not for Sale, that the song "is about the horrific gang rape of a dancer who winds up falling in love but can't let go of the pain."

== Music video ==
The music video was directed by Josh Taft. The video is presented as an old film peep show; rendered nearly completely in black-and-white. Throughout the video, the band can be seen playing in a white room, with objects such as bubbles and shiny diamonds. Various shots of exotic dancers are seen dancing around the screen as well, along with shots of the band members playing. During Dean DeLeo's guitar solo, the screen turns into the fuzzy color structure which was a trademark of the 1960s. The segment shows DeLeo playing in a colorful meadow, and it then fades back into black and white for the rest of the video.

== Charts ==
=== Weekly charts ===
Chart (1996–1997)	Peak position
Canada Top Singles (RPM)	37
Canada Rock/Alternative (RPM)	2
US Radio Songs (Billboard)	53
US Alternative Airplay (Billboard)	6
US Mainstream Rock Airplay (Billboard)	1

=== Year-end charts ===
Chart (1996)	Position
US Mainstream Rock Tracks (Billboard)	96

Chart (1997)	Position
Canada Rock/Alternative (RPM)	43
US Mainstream Rock Tracks (Billboard)	18
US Modern Rock Tracks (Billboard)	41

== Release history ==
Release dates and formats for "Lady Picture Show"
Region	Date	Format(s)	Label(s)	Ref.
United States	October 22, 1996	Contemporary hit radio	Atlantic	
