= Heaven & Hot Rods =

1999 promotional single by Stone Temple Pilots

Promotional single by Stone Temple Pilots

from the album No. 4
- Released: December 7, 1999
- Studio: A&M, Ocean Way (Hollywood, California); Royaltone (North Hollywood, California); Silent Sound, Southern Tracks (Atlanta, Georgia); Village Recorder (Los Angeles)
- Genre: Grunge; alternative metal; power pop
- Length: 3:26
- Label: Atlantic
- Songwriters: Dean DeLeo; Scott Weiland
- Producer: Brendan O'Brien

Stone Temple Pilots promotional single chronology
"Art School Girl" (1997)	"Heaven & Hot Rods" (1999)	"No Way Out" (2000)

"Heaven & Hot Rods" is a song by the American rock band Stone Temple Pilots and was released as the first promotional single from their fourth studio album, No. 4 (1999), in December 1999.

== Personnel ==
Personnel are adapted from the Heaven & Hot Rods liner notes.

Stone Temple Pilots

- Dean DeLeo – guitar
- Robert DeLeo – bass
- Eric Kretz – drums
- Scott Weiland – vocals, organ

Production and additional personnel

- Brendan O'Brien – production, mixing
- Nick DiDia – recording
- Russ Fowler – recording
- Andrew Garver – editing
- Stephen Marcussen – mastering
- Dave Reed – engineering
- Allen Sides – engineering

== Charts ==
=== Weekly charts ===
Chart (2000)	Peak position
US Alternative Airplay (Billboard)	30
US Mainstream Rock (Billboard)	17

=== Year-end charts ===
Chart (2000)	Position
US Mainstream Rock Tracks (Billboard)	78

== Release history ==
Region	Date	Format(s)	Label	Ref.
United States	December 7, 1999	Mainstream rock; active rock; alternative radio	Atlantic	
