= Blow Up the Outside World =

1996 single by Soundgarden

Single by Soundgarden

from the album Down on the Upside
- B-side: "Dusty" (Moby mix)
- Released: December 16, 1996
- Genre: Grunge
- Length: 5:46
- Label: A&M
- Songwriter: Chris Cornell
- Producers: Adam Kasper; Soundgarden

Soundgarden singles chronology
"Burden in My Hand" (1996)	"Blow Up the Outside World" (1996)	"Ty Cobb" (1997)

Music video
- "Blow Up The Outside World" on YouTube

"Blow Up the Outside World" is a song by the American rock band Soundgarden. Written by frontman Chris Cornell, "Blow Up the Outside World" was released in December 1996, as the third single from the band's fifth studio album, Down on the Upside (1996). The song topped the Billboard Mainstream Rock Tracks chart, where it spent a total of four weeks at number one. The song was included on Soundgarden's 1997 greatest hits album, A-Sides.

== Origin and recording ==
"Blow Up the Outside World" was written by frontman Chris Cornell. Cornell stated that he wrote the song when he was in Toronto, Ontario, Canada, and at the time of writing it "[he] was a little fucked up". Guitarist Kim Thayil on the song's guitar solo:

A blues-type thing, exactly. And after I recorded it, the rest of the band loved it, and the assistant engineer loved it, but I kept feeling like it was too stiff. I was using a Tele with .011's. I was listening to it, going, 'You know, it doesn't have my trademark finger vibrato', like you can hear on Ultramega OK and Badmotorfinger. I wasn't quite satisfied with it, but because everyone else really enjoyed it, eventually I let it go... I finally had to relax and trust the guys that it was cool.

== Composition ==
Regarding "Blow Up the Outside World", drummer Matt Cameron stated that "there's certain points in that tune that are just a really nice, emotional crunch that happens somehow ... that one in particular, that made my girlfriend cry the first time she heard it". Thayil on the song:

A nice ironic, final single in a way. People said there was a Beatles-ish element. I suppose there is a bit of Paul McCartney and a little bit of Lennon in the flavour of the song. Everyone in the band grew up with the Beatles and we had a certain degree of respect and admiration for them that's not uncommon. I think many people were Beatles fans, especially for that period in time. There's a number of acoustic guitars on the track as well and then, towards the end of the song, it gets louder and aggressive and goes to these power chords, and is maybe a little reminiscent of AC/DC.

== Lyrics ==
When asked if he really wanted to "blow up the outside world", Cornell said, "All the time, so it doesn't encroach on me—you can hibernate and not have to worry about it."

== Release and reception ==
"Blow Up the Outside World" was released as a single in 1996 with a previously unreleased B-side titled "A Splice of Space Jam". The cover art is taken from a series of photographs by Catherine Chalmers featuring a tomato being eaten by caterpillars, which at one point were considered for use for the Down on the Upside cover.

It appeared on Billboard magazine's Hot 100 Airplay chart, reaching the top 60. The song peaked at number one on the Billboard Mainstream Rock Tracks chart and number eight on the Billboard Modern Rock Tracks chart. The song spent a total of four weeks at number one on the Mainstream Rock chart.

Outside the United States, the single was released commercially in Australia. In Canada, the song reached the top 90 on the Canadian Singles Chart, and later it charted on the Canadian Alternative Top 30 chart, where it reached number two.

Neil Strauss of The New York Times said that "the band can harness grunge's self-absorption to heavy metal's destructive energy and come up with a song like 'Blow Up the Outside World'."

== Music video ==
The music video for "Blow Up the Outside World" was directed by Devo bassist Gerald Casale. The video was filmed at Occidental Studios in Los Angeles, California. The video features Cornell being tied down to a chair in a position similar to Alex DeLarge from the 1971 film A Clockwork Orange and forced to watch a film parodying the montage from the 1974 film The Parallax View while being watched by scientists. It also features the band performing the song in a room which is eventually blown up. The video was released in October 1996.

== Track listing ==
All songs written by Chris Cornell, except where noted:

CD (Europe) and 7" Vinyl (Europe)

1. "Blow Up the Outside World" – 5:46
2. "Dusty" (Moby mix) (Cornell, Ben Shepherd) – 5:06

CD (Australia and Europe)

1. "Blow Up the Outside World" – 5:46
2. "Gun" (live) – 5:41
3. "Get on the Snake" (live) (Cornell, Kim Thayil) – 3:40
4. "A Splice of Space Jam" (Matt Cameron, Cornell, Shepherd, Thayil) – 4:03

Notes

- Live tracks recorded on December 10, 1989 at the Whisky A Go-Go in Los Angeles, California. This show was recorded for the Louder Than Live home video. The sleeve of the single incorrectly states the date as May 1, 1990.

Promotional CD (US)

1. "Blow Up the Outside World" – 5:46
2. "Blow Up the Outside World" (edit)

== Personnel ==
- Chris Cornell – vocals, rhythm guitar
- Kim Thayil – lead guitar
- Ben Shepherd – bass guitar
- Matt Cameron – drums, percussion

== Charts ==
=== Weekly charts ===
Weekly chart performance for "Blow Up the Outside World"
Chart (1996–1997)	Peak position
Australia (ARIA)	76
Australia Alternative (ARIA)	12
Canada Top Singles (RPM)	89
Canada Rock/Alternative (RPM)	2
UK Singles (Official Charts)	40
US Radio Songs (Billboard)	53
US Mainstream Rock (Billboard)	1
US Alternative Airplay (Billboard)	8

=== Year-end charts ===
Year-end chart performance for "Blow Up the Outside World"
Chart (1996)	Position
US Mainstream Rock Tracks (Billboard)	92

Chart (1997)	Position
US Mainstream Rock Tracks (Billboard)	13
US Modern Rock Tracks (Billboard)	53
