= Tumble in the Rough =

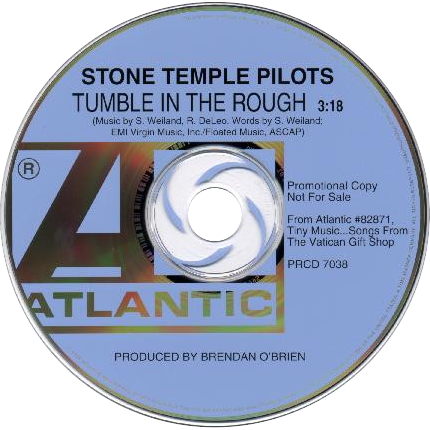
- US promotional CD single

Promotional single by Stone Temple Pilots

from the album Tiny Music... Songs from the Vatican Gift Shop
- Released: January 31, 1997
- Recorded: 1996
- Genre: Alternative rock; hard rock; punk rock
- Length: 3:18
- Label: Atlantic
- Songwriter: Scott Weiland
- Producer: Brendan O'Brien

Stone Temple Pilots promotional single chronology
"Dancing Days" (1995)	"Tumble in the Rough" (1997)	"Art School Girl" (1997)

Audio sample
- "Tumble in the Rough": file; help

"Tumble in the Rough" is a song by American rock band Stone Temple Pilots released in 1996 as the third track on their third studio album Tiny Music... Songs from the Vatican Gift Shop. The song is distinct for being the only on any of the band's albums in which Scott Weiland solely wrote both the lyrics and music. As such, it was often featured in the setlists of Weiland's solo bands.

A promotional single was released by Atlantic Records on January 31, 1997, and peaked at No. 60 on the Canada Top Singles chart. The song was also successful on rock and alternative radio in both the United States and Canada, peaking at No. 9 on the US Mainstream Rock chart.

== Background ==
In recalling the origins of the track, the band's guitarist, Dean DeLeo, told Consequence the following:

'Tumble in the Rough' actually came about from Scott wrestling with a guitar at the house in Santa Ynez where we wrote and recorded the whole record. We had noticed him sitting around for a couple days just banging out those chords. The verse riff that you hear where it goes from a G to a B-flat, he came up with that lick first and we kind of built the whole song around it. From there it metamorphosed into Robert writing the opening and ending licks. We arranged it, Scott wrote the lyrics and melody, and it was really as simple as that.

== Composition and lyrics ==
"Tumble in the Rough" is an alternative rock, hard rock and punk rock song, with a key of G minor, and a moderate rock tempo of 132 beats per minute. The song has elements of glam rock, arena rock, grunge and is punk-influenced, with a layered sound influenced by the 1960s, but prioritizing texture, tone and mood over directness, as is typical of the genre.

The song is distinct for being the only on any Stone Temple Pilots album in which Scott Weiland solely wrote both the lyrics and music. It sees Weiland confronting his inner demons with no self-pity, as exemplified by the lyric: " I made excuses for a million lies, but all I got was humble kidney pie, so what?"

== Critical reception ==
Sadie Sartini Garner of Pitchfork, while praising the song for moving with a "newfound speed and ease", felt it continued the band's lack of originality. She criticized the song for a casual arrangement and flat melody, and opined that other bands, such as Spacehog, were already mixing glam rock and post-grunge better. Charles Aaron of Spin writes that "Tumble in the Rough" enthusiastically pays tribute to Exile on Main St., the tenth studio album by the Rolling Stones, and proves that Stone Temple Pilots "sound most like themselves when they sound like someone else."

== Live version ==
A live version of "Tumble in the Rough" was recorded by Stone Temple Pilots at their performance for MTV Spring Break at Club La Vela in Panama City Beach, Florida. This version was unreleased until July 2021, when it was included on disc three of the deluxe 25th anniversary box set edition of Tiny Music... Songs from the Vatican Gift Shop as part of the full 14-song set from that show. A newly remastered version, and an early recording of the song also appear on the box set.

== Track listing ==
All tracks are written by Scott Weiland.

No.	Title	Length
1.	"Tumble in the Rough"	3:18
Total length:		3:18

== Personnel ==
Credits adapted from Tiny Music... Songs from the Vatican Gift Shop liner notes.

Stone Temple Pilots

- Scott Weiland – vocals
- Dean DeLeo – guitar
- Robert DeLeo – bass
- Eric Kretz – drums

Additional personnel

- Brendan O'Brien – producer, mixing
- Nick DiDia – recording engineer
- Caram Costanzo – 2nd engineer
- Chris Goss – vocal engineer
- Tracy Chisholm – vocal engineer
- Stephen Marcussen – mastering
- Ron Boustead – digital editing

== Chart positions ==
Chart (1997)	Peak Position
Canada Top Singles (RPM)	60
Canada Rock/Alternative (RPM)	23
US Alternative Airplay (Billboard)	36
US Mainstream Rock (Billboard)	9
