= Down (Stone Temple Pilots song) =

1999 song by Stone Temple Pilots

Single by Stone Temple Pilots

from the album No. 4
- B-side: "MC5"; "Down" (live)
- Released: September 24, 1999
- Genre: Grunge; alternative metal; hard rock
- Length: 3:48
- Label: Atlantic
- Composer: Robert DeLeo
- Lyricist: Scott Weiland
- Producer: Brendan O'Brien

Stone Temple Pilots singles chronology
"Lady Picture Show" (1996)	"Down" (1999)	"Sour Girl" (2000)

Audio sample
- "Down": file; help

Music video
- "Down" on YouTube

"Down" is a song by American rock band Stone Temple Pilots, released as the first single from their fourth album, No. 4. In the United States, the song peaked at No. 5 on the Billboard Mainstream Rock Tracks chart and No. 9 on the Billboard Modern Rock Tracks chart. "Down" appears on the compilation albums Thank You and Buy This.

== Reception ==
In 2001, "Down" was nominated for Best Hard Rock Performance at the Grammy Awards, an award STP had previously won for the song "Plush" in 1994. In 2015, Loudwire and Stereogum ranked the song number four and number three, respectively, on their lists of the 10 greatest Stone Temple Pilots songs.

== Music video ==
The song's music video was directed by Robert Hales and Mark Racco. It features a dark room with two projection screens. A white light continuously flickers in the room as confetti is raining down. The screens alternate between images of the band performing the song at the House of Blues in Las Vegas, a woman in a room that either shows her underwater or surrounded by fire raining down on her, and shots of a coffee mug falling to the floor and shattering. On occasion, the song's lyrics will also flash on either screen.

== Track listing ==
1. "Down" – 3:49
2. "Down" (live) – 3:59
3. "MC5" – 2:42

== Charts ==
=== Weekly charts ===
Chart (1999)	Peak position
Canada Rock/Alternative (RPM)	16
US Bubbling Under Hot 100 (Billboard)	7
US Mainstream Rock Airplay (Billboard)	5
US Alternative Airplay (Billboard)	9

=== Year-end charts ===
Chart (1999)	Position
US Mainstream Rock Tracks (Billboard)	50
US Modern Rock Tracks (Billboard)	80

Chart (2000)	Position
US Mainstream Rock Tracks (Billboard)	61

== Release history ==
Release dates and formats for "Down"
Region	Date	Format	Label	Ref.
United States	September 24, 1999	Rock radio	Atlantic	
