= All in the Suit That You Wear =

Single by Stone Temple Pilots

from the album Thank You
- Released: October 18, 2003
- Recorded: 2002
- Genre: Hard rock; grunge
- Length: 3:41
- Label: Atlantic
- Songwriters: Scott Weiland; Robert DeLeo; Dean DeLeo; Eric Kretz

Stone Temple Pilots singles chronology
"Revolution" (2001)	"All in the Suit That You Wear" (2003)	"Between the Lines" (2010)

Audio sample
- file; help

"All in the Suit That You Wear" is a song by the American rock band Stone Temple Pilots. The song was the band's final single before their break-up in 2003 and only appears on the compilation album Thank You. Credited as being written by all members in the band, "All in the Suit That You Wear" received moderate radio airplay, peaking at number five on the Mainstream Rock chart and number 19 on the Modern Rock chart. It was intended to be the lead single on the soundtrack for the 2002 film Spider-Man. However, Chad Kroeger and Josey Scott's song "Hero" was ultimately chosen as the lead single.

== Track listing ==
1. "All in the Suit That You Wear" – 3:41
2. "Sex Type Thing" (live video)

== Charts ==
Chart (2003)	Peak position
US Mainstream Rock (Billboard)	5
US Alternative Airplay (Billboard)	19
US Bubbling Under Hot 100 (Billboard)	18
