= Trippin' on a Hole in a Paper Heart =

1996 single by Stone Temple Pilots

Single by Stone Temple Pilots

from the album Tiny Music... Songs from the Vatican Gift Shop
- B-side: "Pop's Love Suicide"; "Ride the Cliché"
- Released: June 18, 1996
- Genre: Alternative rock
- Length: 2:56
- Label: Atlantic
- Composer: Eric Kretz
- Lyricist: Scott Weiland
- Producer: Brendan O'Brien

Stone Temple Pilots singles chronology
| "Big Bang Baby" (1996) | "Trippin' on a Hole in a Paper Heart" (1996) | "Lady Picture Show" (1996) |

Audio sample
- file; help

Music video
- "Trippin' on a Hole in a Paper Heart" on YouTube

"Trippin' on a Hole in a Paper Heart" is a song by the American rock band Stone Temple Pilots from their third album, Tiny Music... Songs from the Vatican Gift Shop (1996). It was released as the album's second single on June 18, 1996, and topped the US Billboard Mainstream Rock Tracks chart. In 1996, "Trippin' on a Hole in a Paper Heart" was the most-played song on US active rock radio stations and the 48th most-played song across all radio formats. The track later appeared on Stone Temple Pilots' greatest hits album, Thank You (2003).

== Composition and meaning ==
The core music was written by drummer Eric Kretz, while the lyrics were written by Scott Weiland. Weiland stated in a radio interview that the very ambiguous and mysterious lyrics to the song alluded to a "very bad experience dropping acid." In his autobiography Not Dead and Not For Sale (its title a reference to the lyrics of Trippin'), he adds that it "reflects my hunger for redemption". The song's chorus riff references Led Zeppelin's "Dancing Days", which the band performed on Encomium: A Tribute to Led Zeppelin.

== Critical reception ==
In 1997, "Trippin' on a Hole in a Paper Heart" received a nomination for Best Hard Rock Performance at the 39th Annual Grammy Awards. In 2015, Loudwire and Stereogum ranked the song number six and number one, respectively, on their lists of the 10 greatest Stone Temple Pilots songs. In 2021, Sadie Sartini Garner of Pitchfork praised the song as a representation of alternative rock "whose burning chorus would've fit on Alice in Chains' Dirt, and whose choppy, pepped-up verses cleared a happier path out of grunge that bands like Third Eye Blind would gladly follow."

== Charts ==
=== Weekly charts ===
| Chart (1996) | Peak position |
|---|---|
| Canada Rock/Alternative (RPM) | 1 |
| US Radio Songs (Billboard) | 36 |
| US Alternative Airplay (Billboard) | 3 |
| US Mainstream Rock Airplay (Billboard) | 1 |

=== Year-end charts ===
| Chart (1996) | Position |
|---|---|
| Canada Rock/Alternative (RPM) | 7 |
| US Mainstream Rock Tracks (Billboard) | 6 |
| US Modern Rock Tracks (Billboard) | 4 |

== Release history ==
Release dates and formats for "Trippin' on a Hole in a Paper Heart"
| Region | Date | Format(s) | Label(s) | Ref. |
|---|---|---|---|---|
| United States | 1996 | Rock radio | Atlantic | |
| United States | June 18, 1996 | Contemporary hit radio | Atlantic | |
