= Sour Girl =

2000 single by Stone Temple Pilots

Single by Stone Temple Pilots

from the album No. 4
- B-side: "Sex & Violence" (live); "Sour Girl" (live)
- Released: April 4, 2000
- Genre: Alternative rock; psychedelic rock; pop rock
- Length: 4:16
- Label: Atlantic
- Composer: Dean DeLeo
- Lyricist: Scott Weiland
- Producer: Brendan O'Brien

Stone Temple Pilots singles chronology
"Down" (1999)	"Sour Girl" (2000)	"Break on Through (To the Other Side)" (2000)

Audio sample
- "Sour Girl": file; help

Music video
- "Sour Girl" on YouTube

"Sour Girl" is a song by the American rock band Stone Temple Pilots. It was written by singer Scott Weiland and guitarist Dean DeLeo and released as the second single from the band's fourth studio album, No. 4 (1999). "Sour Girl" became the band's only song to chart on the US Billboard Hot 100 chart, peaking at No. 78. Billboard ranked "Sour Girl" at No. 88 on its list of the "100 Best Rock Songs of the 2000s". "Sour Girl" later appeared on the compilation albums Thank You and Buy This.

== Background ==
Scott Weiland talked about the song in his autobiography Not Dead & Not for Sale:

"Everyone is convinced that it's about my romance with Mary [Forsberg, second wife]," "But everyone is wrong. 'Sour Girl' was written after the collapse of my relationship with Jannina [sic]. It's about her. 'She was a sour girl the day that she met me,' I wrote. 'She was a happy girl the day she left me… I was a superman, but looks are deceiving. The rollercoaster ride's a lonely one. I pay a ransom note to stop it from steaming.' The ransom note, of course, was the fortune our divorce was costing me. And the happy state, which I presumed to be Jannina's [sic] mood, was because she had finally rid her life of a man who had never been faithful."

During their episode of Making the Video, Weiland says,

"This song is really sort of about an individual who drew some poor choices, some poor actions... ruins the one relationship that means the most to him. the woman in the song leaves him because of it."

== Chart performance ==
"Sour Girl" peaked at No. 4 on the Billboard Mainstream Rock Tracks chart, No. 3 on the Billboard Modern Rock Tracks chart, and No. 6 on the Billboard Triple-A chart. As of 2026, it is the band's only entry on the Billboard Hot 100, peaking at No. 78.

== Music video ==
A music video was released to accompany this single and stars Sarah Michelle Gellar, who was a fan of the band, as the female lead. At the time the video was made, Gellar was a popular star thanks to her TV series Buffy the Vampire Slayer and her movies Cruel Intentions and I Know What You Did Last Summer. The video was directed by David Slade, whose later work includes episodes of Hannibal, and the movie The Twilight Saga: Eclipse. The video was nominated for Best Cinematography on MTV Video Music Awards in 2000.

== Awards ==
Nominations for "Sour Girl"
Year	Nominee / work	Award	Result
2000	"Sour Girl"	MTV Video Music Award for Best Cinematography	Nominated

== Track listing ==
1. "Sour Girl"
2. "Sex & Violence" (live)
3. "Sour Girl" (live)

== Charts ==
=== Weekly charts ===
Weekly chart performance for "Sour Girl"
Chart (2000)	Peak position
Australia (ARIA)	66
Canada Rock/Alternative (RPM)	3
US Billboard Hot 100	78
US Adult Alternative Airplay (Billboard)	6
US Alternative Airplay (Billboard)	3
US Adult Pop Airplay (Billboard)	37
US Mainstream Rock Airplay (Billboard)	4

=== Weekly charts ===
Year-end chart performance for "Sour Girl"
Chart (2000)	Position
US Mainstream Rock Tracks (Billboard)	14
US Modern Rock Tracks (Billboard)	8
US Triple-A (Billboard)	12
