= No. 4 (album) =

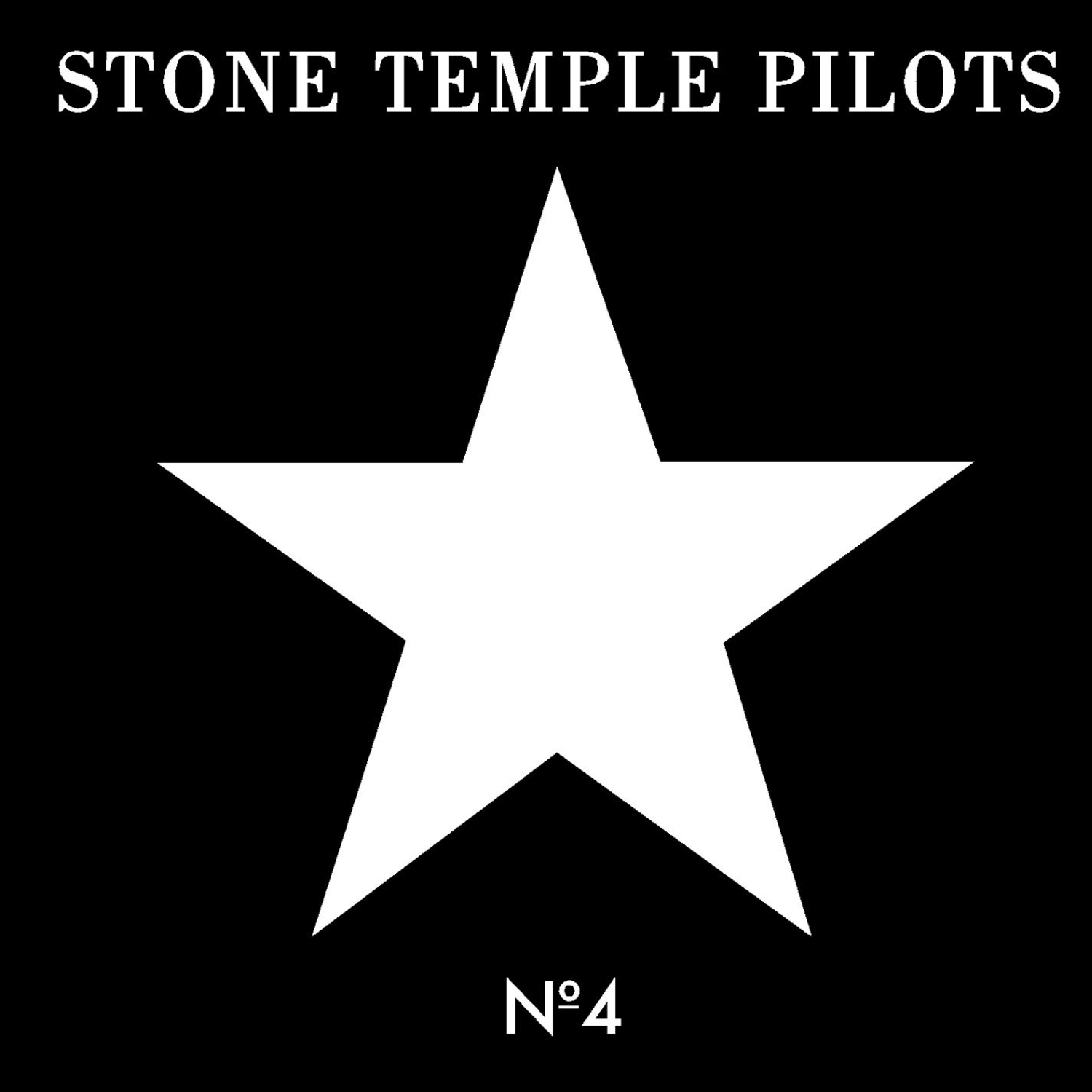

Studio album by Stone Temple Pilots
- Released: October 26, 1999
- Recorded: 1998–1999
- Genres: Grunge; alternative rock; hard rock; glam rock; psychedelic rock; pop rock; alternative metal
- Length: 42:17
- Label: Atlantic
- Producer: Brendan O'Brien

Stone Temple Pilots chronology
Tiny Music... Songs from the Vatican Gift Shop (1996)	No. 4 (1999)	Shangri-La Dee Da (2001)

Singles from No. 4
- 1. "Down" Released: September 24, 1999; 2. "Sour Girl" Released: April 16, 2000

No. 4 (officially stylized as № 4) is the fourth studio album by the American rock band Stone Temple Pilots, released on October 26, 1999, by Atlantic Records. The album was a return to the band's earlier hard rock roots, while also blending elements of heavy metal, psychedelic rock and alternative rock. Despite the lack of promotion due to singer Scott Weiland's one-year jail sentence shortly before the album's release, No. 4 was certified Platinum by the RIAA on August 7, 2000, and by the CRIA in August 2001.

The song "Down" was nominated for Best Hard Rock Performance at the Grammy Awards. The album also produced one of STP's biggest hits, "Sour Girl", which charted at No. 78 on the Billboard Hot 100, their only song to appear on that chart.

== Musical style ==
No. 4, one of the last big-budget grunge and alternative rock albums of the 1990s, combines the hard rock-oriented sound of Core and Purple, with the glam and pop rock influences of Tiny Music... Songs from the Vatican Gift Shop. Italian authors Daniele Follero and Luca Masperone, described the album as "very heavy", as Stone Temple Pilots "veer clearly towards alternative metal," in their book La storia di Hard Rock & Heavy Metal. Stephen Thomas Erlewine of AllMusic considered the album the band's "hardest effort" since Core, remarking that "even the ballads and neo-psychedelic pop have none of the swirling production that distinguished Tiny Music," adding that it "consolidates all [of STP's] strengths." Benjamin Ray of The Daily Vault opined that No. 4 is the band's "most garage rock disc to date," and that it alternates between "grunge rockers, pop songs and ballads."

== Critical reception ==
Professional ratings
Review scores
Source	Rating
AllMusic	4/5 stars
Christgau's Consumer Guide	(neither)
The Daily Vault	B+
Encyclopedia of Popular Music	2/5 stars
Entertainment Weekly	C
NME	1/5 stars
PopMatters	6.5/10
Rolling Stone	3/5 stars
The Rolling Stone Album Guide	2.5/5 stars
Spin	5/10

AllMusic critic Stephen Thomas Erlewine rated the album four out of five stars, praising the opening tracks "Down" and "Heaven & Hot Rods". Entertainment Weekly critic Rob Brunner graded it "C", calling the album "generic and phoned in" and mostly "unexciting and obvious". Brunner deemed "Down" as "dour", "No Way Out" as a "dated" Jane's Addiction ripoff, and "Atlanta" as "pretentious" and "lugubrious". Brunner further deemed the tracks "Sex & Violence" and "Pruno" as "hardly original" and having resemblances to David Bowie but also as "well-crafted". Rolling Stone critic Lorraine Ali rated it three out of five, calling the songs "strong pop-rock pieces but without the self-consciousness of previous efforts". CMJ New Music Monthly critic M. Tye Comer called the album "powerful and cohesive", recommending readers to listen the tracks "Heaven & Hot Rods", "Church on Tuesday", "Sour Girl", and "No Way Out". Critics noted similarities between "Atlanta" and "My Favorite Things" from the 1959 musical The Sound of Music.

== Artwork ==
The cover art for No. 4 generated some brief controversy because it strongly resembled the cover of the debut EP from Washington, D.C.–based band Power Lloyd. The Power Lloyd CD Election Day had been released in 1998, and the cover was a white five-point star on a black field under the band's name; STP's No. 4 also featured a white five-point star on a black field under the band's name. Power Lloyd co-founder Gene Diotalevi explained that after their band had given a song to MTV to be used on the soundtrack of Celebrity Deathmatch, someone at MTV with an advance copy of No. 4 noticed that the covers were nearly identical, and alerted the band. Diotalevi stated that no one from STP's camp would return their calls or letters, until his band mailed a cease-and-desist letter to STP's record company. STP's legal team then "made an offer to settle that was unacceptable to us", according to Power Lloyd's lawyer Will Shill.

== Track listing ==
All lyrics are written by Scott Weiland.

No. 4 track listing
No.	Title	Music	Length
1.	"Down"	Robert DeLeo	3:51
2.	"Heaven & Hot Rods"	Dean DeLeo	3:26
3.	"Pruno"	R. DeLeo	3:15
4.	"Church on Tuesday"	D. DeLeo	3:00
5.	"Sour Girl"	D. DeLeo	4:16
6.	"No Way Out"	R. DeLeo; D. DeLeo; Eric Kretz; Weiland	4:20
7.	"Sex & Violence"	R. DeLeo	2:54
8.	"Glide"	R. DeLeo	5:00
9.	"I Got You"	R. DeLeo	4:16
10.	"MC5"	D. DeLeo	2:42
11.	"Atlanta"	D. DeLeo	5:19
Total length:			42:17

Japanese edition bonus track
No.	Title	Length
12.	"Down" (live)	3:58

== Personnel ==
Stone Temple Pilots

- Scott Weiland – vocals, organ on "Heaven & Hot Rods"
- Dean DeLeo – electric and acoustic guitars, lap steel and six-string bass on "I Got You"
- Robert DeLeo – bass, backing vocals, percussion on "Church on Tuesday" and "Sour Girl", guitar on "Sex and Violence", "Glide", and "I Got You", fuzz bass and zither on "Glide"
- Eric Kretz – drums, percussion on "No Way Out" and "Atlanta"

Additional personnel

- Brendan O'Brien – producer, mixing, backing vocals on "Pruno", "Sour Girl" and "I Got You", keyboards on "Church on Tuesday", percussion on "Church on Tuesday", "Sour Girl", "Sex & Violence" and "I Got You", piano on "Glide" and "I Got You"
- David Campbell – string arrangement on "Atlanta"
- Suzie Katayama – contractor and cello
- Joel Derouin – concertmaster
- Evan Wilson – violin
- Larry Corbett – cello
- Barrett Martin – bass marimba on "Atlanta"
- Nick DiDia – recording engineer
- Russ Fowler – recording engineer
- Dave Reed – engineer
- Allen Sides – engineer
- Stephen Marcussen – mastering
- Andrew Garver – digital editing
- Erin Haley – production coordinator
- Cheryl Mondello – production coordinator
- Richard Bates – art direction
- Andrea Brooks – art direction
- Chapman Baehler – photography
- Steve Stewart – management

== Charts ==
=== Weekly charts ===
1999–2000 weekly chart performance for No. 4
Chart (1999–2000)	Peak position
Australian Albums (ARIA)	21
German Albums (Offizielle Top 100)	41
Canadian Albums (Billboard)	5
New Zealand Albums (RMNZ)	33
Scottish Albums (Official Charts)	82
UK Albums (OCC)	101
UK Rock & Metal Albums (Official Charts)	4
US Billboard 200	6

2024 weekly chart performance for No. 4
Chart (2024)	Peak position
Hungarian Physical Albums (MAHASZ)	21

=== Year-end charts ===
Year-end chart performance for No. 4
Chart (2000)	Position
Canadian Albums (Nielsen SoundScan)	176
US Billboard 200	161

== Certifications ==
Certifications for No.4
Region	Certification	Certified units/sales
Canada (Music Canada)	Platinum	100,000^{^}
United States (RIAA)	Platinum	1,000,000^{^}
^{^} Shipments figures based on certification alone.
