= Encomium: A Tribute to Led Zeppelin =

Compilation album by Various artists
- Released: March 14, 1995
- Genre: Hard rock
- Length: 52:02
- Label: Atlantic
- Producers: Jolene Cherry, Bill Curbishley and Kevin Williamson

Professional ratings
Review scores
Source	Rating
AllMusic	2.5/5 stars

Encomium: A Tribute to Led Zeppelin is a tribute album by various artists dedicated to Led Zeppelin, released by Atlantic Records on March 14, 1995. Many of the appearing artists were signed to Atlantic or an affiliate at the time of the release.

== Track listing ==
No.	Title	Writer(s)	Producer(s)	Length
1.	"Misty Mountain Hop" (4 Non Blondes)	Jimmy Page; Robert Plant; John Paul Jones	Linda Perry; Dave Navarro	5:44
2.	"Hey, Hey, What Can I Do" (Hootie & The Blowfish)	Page; Plant; Jones; John Bonham	Don Gehman	3:27
3.	"D'yer Mak'er" (Sheryl Crow)	Page; Plant; Jones; Bonham	Bill Bottrell	4:20
4.	"Dancing Days" (Stone Temple Pilots)	Page; Plant	Brendan O'Brien	4:02
5.	"Tangerine" (Big Head Todd and the Monsters)	Page	Big Head Todd and the Monsters; Andy Torri	3:36
6.	"Thank You" (Duran Duran)	Page; Plant	Duran Duran	4:32
7.	"Out on the Tiles" (Blind Melon)	Page; Plant; Bonham	Eddie Kramer	3:14
8.	"Good Times Bad Times" (Cracker)	Page; Jones; Bonham	David Lowery	2:43
9.	"Custard Pie" (Helmet with David Yow)	Page; Plant	Butch Vig; Helmet	4:41
10.	"Four Sticks" (Rollins Band)	Page; Plant	Theo Van Rock	3:30
11.	"Going to California" (Never the Bride)	Page; Plant	Never the Bride	4:24
12.	"Down by the Seaside" (Robert Plant and Tori Amos)	Page; Plant	Robert Plant	7:49

== Release history ==
The Maná track "Fool in the Rain" did not appear on the first release of this album and was added in later editions.

There is also a laserdisc version of this release, containing all 13 tracks (including Maná) and interviews and behind the scenes footage.

- Catalogue: Atlantic 82731-2
