= Burden in My Hand =

1996 single by Soundgarden

Single by Soundgarden

from the album Down on the Upside
- B-side: "Karaoke"
- Released: September 16, 1996
- Length: 4:50
- Label: A&M
- Songwriter: Chris Cornell
- Producers: Adam Kasper; Soundgarden

Soundgarden singles chronology
| "Pretty Noose" (1996) | "Burden in My Hand" (1996) | "Blow Up the Outside World" (1996) |

Music video
- "Burden in My Hand" on YouTube

"Burden in My Hand" is a song by the American rock band Soundgarden. Written by frontman Chris Cornell, "Burden in My Hand" was released on September 16, 1996, as the second single from the band's fifth studio album, Down on the Upside (1996). The song topped the Billboard Mainstream Rock Tracks chart, where it spent five weeks at number one. The song was included on Soundgarden's 1997 greatest hits album, A-Sides.

== Origin and recording ==
"Burden in My Hand" was written by frontman Chris Cornell. It was written in open C tuning.

== Lyrics ==
The lyrics of "Burden in My Hand" suggest the song is about a man who murders a woman he is in a relationship with and leaves her in the desert, not without regret. Guitarist Kim Thayil called the song "the "Hey Joe" of the '90s." In a 2011 interview with ARTISTdirect.com, Cornell was asked what the song had come to mean for him, years later. Cornell responded:

That was a song that really came from the guitar itself. It was mostly like the guitar was dictating what the lyrics should be and creating a mental image. The mental image was this sort of destitute guy. I guess he'd lost his cool if you want to put it that way. He's sort of coming to grips with what had happened and not necessarily feeling particularly emotional about it either way. He's trying to figure out how he would stand up and put one foot in front of the other—or not—and the song never really resolves any of that. It's just that moment of somebody sitting in the dirt. I had more moments like that after that song was written than I ever had before it was, so it means a lot more to me now than it did then.

== Release and reception ==
"Burden in My Hand" was released as a single in 1996 in various versions with the previously unreleased B-sides "Karaoke" and "Bleed Together", the latter of which can also be found on the band's greatest hits compilation, A-Sides (1997). "Burden in My Hand" appeared on Billboard magazine's Hot 100 Airplay chart, reaching the top 40. "Burden in My Hand" became the most successful song from Down on the Upside on the American rock charts. The song peaked at number one on the Billboard Mainstream Rock Tracks chart and number two on the Billboard Modern Rock Tracks chart. The song spent five weeks at number one on the Mainstream Rock chart.

Outside the United States, the single was released in Australia and the United Kingdom. In Canada, the song reached the top ten on the Canadian Singles Chart, and later reached number one on the Alternative Top 30 chart, Soundgarden's second single to top that chart. "Burden in My Hand" also reached number one on the Canadian Year End Alternative Top 50.

== Music video ==
The music video for "Burden in My Hand" was directed by Jake Scott, who had previously directed the "Fell on Black Days" music video for the band. The video shows the band members walking through what appears to be the Kelso Dunes of the eastern Mojave Desert. The fighter aircraft in the video is a J 35 Draken, possibly operated out of the nearby National Test Pilot School at Mojave Air and Space Port. The video was released in June 1996.

== Live performances ==
"Burden in My Hand" was performed on the season 21 finale of Saturday Night Live on 18 May 1996, hosted by Jim Carrey, in support of Down on the Upside.

== In popular culture ==
The song was featured in the seventh episode of the second season of the HBO series The Last of Us.

== Track listing ==
All songs written by Chris Cornell, except where noted:

CD (Europe) and 7" vinyl (Europe)

1. "Burden in My Hand" – 4:50
2. "Karaoke" – 6:01

CD (Europe)

1. "Burden in My Hand" – 4:50
2. "Bleed Together" – 3:54
3. "She's a Politician" – 1:48
4. Chris Cornell Interview – 7:42
  - The interview segment with Chris Cornell is conducted by Tom Russell and was recorded in April 1996. Cornell talks about the cancelled Superunknown tour dates in the UK ("My voice just crapped out"), the pressure to release a record that will sell well ("The pressure comes from us"), publishing companies ("We didn't need that"), and the band's sense of humor ("We don't take ourselves seriously").

CD (Australia and Japan)

1. "Burden in My Hand" – 4:50
2. "Karaoke" – 6:01
3. "Bleed Together" – 3:54
4. "Birth Ritual" (demo) (Cornell, Matt Cameron, Kim Thayil) – 5:50

Promotional CD (UK)

1. "Burden in My Hand" – 4:50
- The club promotional CD is a limited edition of 300 in a clear plastic sleeve, sealed with a blue sticker that doubles as the liner notes.

Promotional CD (US)

1. "Burden in My Hand" – 4:50
2. "Burden in My Hand" (edit)

== Personnel ==
- Chris Cornell – vocals, rhythm guitar
- Kim Thayil – lead guitar
- Ben Shepherd – bass guitar
- Matt Cameron – drums, percussion

== Charts ==
=== Weekly charts ===
1996 weekly chart performance for "Burden in My Hand"
| Chart (1996) | Peak position |
|---|---|
| Australia (ARIA) | 57 |
| Australia Alternative (ARIA) | 11 |
| Canada Top Singles (RPM) | 9 |
| Canada Rock/Alternative (RPM) | 1 |
| European Hot 100 Singles (Music & Media) | 53 |
| Iceland (Íslenski Listinn Topp 40) | 7 |
| Quebec Airplay (ADISQ) | 34 |
| UK Singles (Official Charts) | 33 |
| US Radio Songs (Billboard) | 40 |
| US Mainstream Rock (Billboard) | 1 |
| US Alternative Airplay (Billboard) | 2 |

2017 weekly chart performance for "Burden in My Hand"
| Chart (2017) | Peak position |
|---|---|
| US Rock Digital Song Sales (Billboard) | 25 |

=== Year-end charts ===
Year-end chart performance for "Burden in My Hand"
| Chart (1996) | Position |
|---|---|
| Canada Top Singles (RPM) | 75 |
| Canada Rock/Alternative (RPM) | 1 |
| US Mainstream Rock Tracks (Billboard) | 7 |
| US Modern Rock Tracks (Billboard) | 14 |

== Certifications ==
Certifications for "Burden in My Hand"
| Region | Certification | Certified units/sales |
|---|---|---|
| New Zealand (RMNZ) | Gold | 15,000^{‡} |
^{‡} Sales+streaming figures based on certification alone.
