= Big Bang Baby =

1996 single by Stone Temple Pilots

Single by Stone Temple Pilots

from the album Tiny Music... Songs from the Vatican Gift Shop
- B-side: "Adhesive"; "Daisy"
- Released: March 12, 1996
- Genre: Glam rock; alternative rock
- Length: 3:23
- Label: Atlantic
- Composer: Robert DeLeo
- Lyricist: Scott Weiland
- Producer: Brendan O'Brien

Stone Temple Pilots singles chronology
"Big Empty" (1995)	"Big Bang Baby" (1996)	"Trippin' on a Hole in a Paper Heart" (1996)

Audio sample
- file; help

Music video
- "Big Bang Baby" on YouTube

"Big Bang Baby" is a song by American rock band Stone Temple Pilots. It was the first single to be released from their third studio album, Tiny Music... Songs from the Vatican Gift Shop. The song appeared on several US Billboard charts, topping the Mainstream Rock Tracks chart, peaking at No. 2 on the Modern Rock Tracks chart, and reaching No. 28 on the Hot 100 Airplay chart. In Canada, it entered the top 20, peaking at No. 18 on the RPM 100 Hit Tracks chart. "Big Bang Baby" later appeared on the band's greatest hits album, Thank You (2003).

== Background ==
Referencing the Tiny Music... album in his memoir, Not Dead and Not For Sale, Stone Temple Pilots lead singer Scott Weiland wrote: "We wanted to make a statement. We wanted to deconstruct, go low-tech, get to the dark heart of the matter. I was happy to write Bowie-esque stream-of-consciousness lyrics that didn't need to make sense. Example: 'Big Bang Baby.'"

== Music video ==
The music video features the band performing in a white room. It is an intentional pastiche of videos from the early days of MTV, which were mostly shot on videotape rather than film, and most directly evokes the look of the J. Geils Band's "Freeze Frame". The video was directed by the album artwork's artist, John Eder (marking his directorial debut), and was shot in Los Angeles on March 19, 1996.

== Charts ==
=== Weekly charts ===
Weekly chart performance for "Big Bang Baby"
Chart (1996)	Peak position
Australia (ARIA)	37
Canada Top Singles (RPM)	18
Canada Rock/Alternative (RPM)	1
UK Rock & Metal (Official Charts)	11
US Radio Songs (Billboard)	28
US Mainstream Rock Airplay (Billboard)	1
US Alternative Airplay (Billboard)	2

=== Year-end charts ===
Year-end chart performance for "Big Bang Baby"
Chart (1996)	Position
Canada Rock/Alternative (RPM)	6
US Mainstream Rock Tracks (Billboard)	23
US Modern Rock Tracks (Billboard)	30

== Release history ==
Release dates and formats for "Big Bang Baby"
Region	Date	Format(s)	Label(s)	Ref.
United States	March 12, 1996	Contemporary hit radio	Atlantic	
United Kingdom	April 29, 1996	CD; cassette	Atlantic	
