= Tiny Music... Songs from the Vatican Gift Shop =

Studio album by Stone Temple Pilots
- Released: March 26, 1996
- Recorded: October 1995 – January 1996
- Studios: Westerly Ranch, Santa Ynez, California
- Genres: Alternative rock; glam rock; psychedelic rock
- Length: 41:55
- Label: Atlantic
- Producer: Brendan O'Brien

Stone Temple Pilots chronology
Purple (1994)	Tiny Music... Songs from the Vatican Gift Shop (1996)	№ 4 (1999)

Singles from Tiny Music... Songs from the Vatican Gift Shop
- 1. "Big Bang Baby" Released: March 12, 1996; 2. "Trippin' on a Hole in a Paper Heart" Released: May 1996; 3. "Lady Picture Show" Released: October 22, 1996

Tiny Music... Songs from the Vatican Gift Shop is the third studio album by the American rock band Stone Temple Pilots, released on March 26, 1996, through Atlantic Records. After a brief hiatus throughout 1995, the band regrouped to record the album together at Westerly Ranch in Santa Ynez, California, where they also lived at the time. Like all of the band's albums up to that point, production was handled by Brendan O'Brien.

Tiny Music... initially received mixed reviews, similar to the band's earlier work, but has since received acclaim for radically reinventing the band's sound and image. The album debuted at number four on the Billboard 200 and all three of its singles—"Big Bang Baby", "Trippin' on a Hole in a Paper Heart", and "Lady Picture Show"—reached the top of the Mainstream Rock Tracks chart. The album has been certified 2× platinum by the Recording Industry Association of America. The band promoted the album with a tour throughout 1996 and 1997, although it had to be cut short due to Scott Weiland's ongoing battles with substance abuse.

== Background ==
The period leading up to the recording of Stone Temple Pilots' third album, Tiny Music... Songs from the Vatican Gift Shop, was marked by serious internal challenges, largely stemming from the singer, Scott Weiland's struggles with substance abuse. Although the band had managed to complete Purple (1994), it had been a difficult process due to Weiland's addiction, which had already begun to disrupt the group's stability. By early 1995, the situation had worsened. During initial sessions for the album in February, the band was forced to discard two weeks' worth of recordings as Weiland's condition deteriorated. On May 15, 1995, he was arrested for possession of heroin and cocaine. After being released on bond, Weiland sought out more drugs and eventually secluded himself at the Chateau Marmont hotel in Los Angeles, where he reportedly spent time using drugs with Courtney Love.

During Weiland's absence, the remaining members of Stone Temple Pilots, the guitarist Dean DeLeo, the bassist Robert DeLeo, and the drummer Eric Kretz, began developing a new project. Believing the band had hit a low point, they decided to form Talk Show in the spring of 1995, recruiting the former Ten Inch Men singer Dave Coutts. While the members did not view Talk Show as a temporary side project, Stone Temple Pilots had not officially disbanded. At the same time, Weiland started his own group, the Magnificent Bastards, and contributed tracks to the Tank Girl (1995) soundtrack and the Working Class Hero: A Tribute to John Lennon (1995) compilation. Weiland spent the rest of 1995 cycling through rehabilitation centers, leaving the band's future uncertain.

== Recording ==
In October 1995, Stone Temple Pilots regrouped and went to Westerly Ranch in Santa Ynez, California, a 20,000-square-foot estate, (Note: The size of the property has been variously described by sources. Some say the residence is approximately 25,000 square feet,, while others say 20,000. Statements from the band have referred to it as both 20,000 and 60,000 square feet at different times.) with the producer Brendan O'Brien to begin work on Tiny Music… Songs from the Vatican Gift Shop. According to Dean DeLeo, Robert DeLeo had been spending time in the Santa Barbara and Santa Ynez Valley area and suggested recording there. With the help of a woman named Bobby, the band secured the property, which allowed them all to live on-site while making the album. Only twelve people, the band, O'Brien, crew members, engineers, and a cook were present. Robert DeLeo explained that recording in a house was something the band had long wanted to do. He cited albums such as Goodbye Yellow Brick Road (1973) by Elton John as examples of records made in residential settings. At the same time, he acknowledged that Westerly Ranch was booked for Tiny Music partly in the hope that it would help keep Weiland focused and on schedule, as maintaining attention in a traditional studio environment had become challenging.

The DeLeo brothers first sorted through their collection of roughly 30 songs they wrote during Weiland's absence, deciding which would suit Stone Temple Pilots and which would be used for Talk Show. As Dean DeLeo later recalled, "Robert and I had about 30 songs, and we sat in the room one night and basically went down the list and marked next to every song: Scott, Scott, Dave, Scott, Dave, Dave, Scott... It's really weird, because in all reality it was like 'Big Bang Baby' could've been on [the] Talk Show record and 'Everybody Loves My Car' could've been on Tiny Music." Kretz described the period leading up to the recording as stressful. However, once the band settled into the house where they were working, the atmosphere shifted. "Once we got there, the house contained only our egos and our dogs," he said, adding that living together again and reacquainting themselves without getting on one another's nerves allowed the process to fall into place.

Compared to the relatively fast creative process of Purple, the band was able to "stretch out" and experiment even more for Tiny Music. Kretz explained that while their debut studio album Core (1992) consisted largely of songs the band already had before bringing in producer Brendan O'Brien, Purple marked a shift toward greater studio experimentation after learning new techniques during their first collaboration with him. That experimentation, he said, "opened up the floodgates" for Tiny Music. Robert DeLeo said that the house itself inspired exploration, as the band felt curious enough to record in several different rooms. Kretz described it as a setting "where we could live and bring in all the recording equipment in the world", with microphones, drums, guitars, amplifiers, and even a Fender Rhodes placed throughout the space.

The band utilized each room for its own distinct acoustics. The tiled foyer, with its 20-foot ceilings, created a natural reverb effect that can be heard on "Lady Picture Show". O'Brien encouraged spontaneity, and Kretz noted that "Brendan loves to try different things", leading to guitar parts recorded in spaces such as the bathroom and entryway. Some of the percussion was tracked in a large bathroom to capture what Kretz described as "beautiful, natural reverbs and crazy sounds". For "Lady Picture Show", Kretz recorded drums in the attic's cedar closet, while the drums for "Big Bang Baby" were recorded on the front lawn. He added that many of the songs were written "right there, in the heat of the moment", and said the process resulted in a record that avoided standard studio effects. Robert DeLeo described it as "a great experience to make the sounds up yourself rather than be in a studio and assume the sounds were going to be good because of the space you were at and the gear that was there".

According to Kretz, recording and living together at Westerly Ranch created a playful atmosphere, with days that might include playing tennis and drinking margaritas. Dean DeLeo described the sessions as "too much of a paradise to feel anything other than joy and laughter". Despite this, the period was also marked by tension. Robert DeLeo said there were times when, after walking past Weiland's bedroom on the way upstairs, they would check on him to see if he was alive, "literally". Kretz said Weiland would occasionally disappear for days and return in poor condition, calling the situation heartbreaking. He added that it was naïve if the intention behind recording outside a major city was to cut off Weiland's drug supply. "Where there's a will, there's a way," he said. Kretz described cycles in which Weiland would be sober and "laughing and witty and enjoyable to be around", followed by abrupt downturns. "It definitely put the gloom and the ugliness in there," he stated, adding that the record reflected "the good, the bad and the ugly" of what the band was experiencing.

Despite the tension, the band rediscovered the joy of recording together during the sessions. Kretz said he was "really blown away" after reading Weiland's lyrics. He admitted that the band had initially worried the material might be self-indulgent, but instead found it inspiring, adding that he wished Weiland would assemble a book of poems. Dean DeLeo told MTV that when the band wrote a song and gave it to Weiland, "what he puts on it is just satisfying and puts it to another level". Looking back on that period, Dean DeLeo reflected on the experience of working with Weiland: "To be affiliated with somebody of that musical magnitude and to be so fulfilled by it, and to watch this person just go into this deep hole of demise was just fucking awful. It was just awful, man."

Robert DeLeo noted that the home setting gave the band more freedom to explore musical directions without second-guessing. He had been deeply immersed in bossa nova at the time, and the openness of the environment encouraged him to bring that influence into the sessions. Dean DeLeo said the group believed the setting would help them "get back to basics" and reconnect with their blues background. However, the creative atmosphere did not entirely eliminate the strain within the group. Weiland's history of addiction loomed over the sessions, and the band remained aware of the instability that had previously disrupted their plans. Reflecting on the period, Robert DeLeo noted that while they had hoped to tour Purple extensively, they were only able to promote it for six months. That disappointment, paired with internal and external pressure to reestablish momentum, fueled much of the writing for the new record.

== Music and lyrics ==
The album saw the band deviate from the grunge sound present on their first two records and incorporate a wider variety of different influences, including psychedelia, shoegaze, jangle pop and glam rock. Weiland opted for a higher, raspier tone for much of the album's material, as opposed to the deeper vocals present on Core and Purple. It also features a wider array of instrumentation, including organ, vibraphone, and trumpet. Stephen Thomas Erlewine of AllMusic stated in his review of the album that "Tiny Music illustrates that the band aren't content with resting on their laurels" and "STP have added a new array of sounds that lend depth to their immediately accessible hooks." Erlewine also wrote that the album "showcases the band at their most tuneful and creative."

== Songs ==
Tiny Music opens with "Press Play", an instrumental featuring a Rhodes piano and runs for 81 seconds. "Pop's Love Suicide" and "Tumble in the Rough" move with a "newfound speed and ease", though Sadie Sartini Garner of Pitchfork noted their "casual arrangements and flat melodies" give them a slight feel. "Tumble in the Rough" was the only Stone Temple Pilots track credited solely to Weiland for both music and lyrics. According to Ultimate Classic Rock's Saby Reyes-Kulkarni, the song leans toward punk rock with a layered sound influenced by the 1960s, prioritizing texture, tone, and mood over directness. "Big Bang Baby" explores themes of fame's emptiness, with references to Weiland's own death multiple times in the lyrics. According to Garner, the song incorporates a direct melodic nod to the Rolling Stones' "Jumpin' Jack Flash" and namechecks David Bowie's Station to Station, framing it as a commentary on stardom. The line "Sell your soul and sign an autograph" precedes a shift into the refrain "Nothing's for free," a moment where the irony becomes clear. "Lady Picture Show" combines melodic elements of early '70s rock with a structure reminiscent of Beatles-style pop. Garner compares it to "You Never Give Me Your Money", noting its emotional restraint and the detached, observational tone of Weiland's vocal delivery, which lends the song a subtle melancholy that the critic contrasts with the "clumsiness" of the band's breakthrough hit "Sex Type Thing". Weiland's lyrics, as he explained in his autobiography Not Dead and Not for Sale, were inspired by the gang rape of a dancer, who later struggles to reconcile love with lingering trauma.

"And So I Know" showcases Robert DeLeo's interest in jazz and bossa nova, creating a laid-back, swaying atmosphere. Bryan Rolli in Consequence highlighted the song's lithe quality, while NME labeled it "blatant easy listening", pointing to its gentle guitar-jazz style as a contrast to the typical emotional approach of many male-fronted rock bands of the era. "Trippin' on a Hole in a Paper Heart" incorporates a riff reminiscent of Led Zeppelin's "Dancing Days" and builds to a large-scale chorus where Weiland declares himself as "not dead and not for sale". The track also features a prominent guitar solo from Dean DeLeo, described by Rolli as "scorching". "Art School Girl" blends British post-punk with jazz elements, according to Reyes-Kulkarni, and stands out for its irony and humor. Rolli described the track as a satirical take on underground art culture, with Weiland adopting a mock-serious tone before the chorus erupts into noisy garage punk. "Adhesive" combines elements of shoegaze and indie rock, with a slow, ambient arrangement that features trumpet solos reminiscent of Miles Davis' Sketches of Spain (1960). Weiland's lyrics take a dark, introspective turn, reflecting on mortality and commercialism as he sings about selling more records if he were dead. The track's spacious production and trumpet lines by Dave Ferguson contribute to its expansive atmosphere. "Ride the Cliché" subtly incorporates progressive elements, blending them with classic rock influences.

== Album artwork ==
The album cover was designed by John Eder to resemble a 70s-style LP cover and based on an idea from Weiland, features a woman in a swimsuit standing in a pool with a crocodile in it. The cover model was Maya Siklai (formerly Goodman), a family friend of art director John Heiden.

== Release ==
In the United States, the album debuted at number four on the Billboard 200 albums chart on the issue dated April 13, 1996, with 162,500 copies sold. The album was certified double platinum, but was not as commercially successful as STP's first two albums.

== Critical reception ==
Professional ratings
Initial reviews
Review scores
Source	Rating
The Daytona Beach News-Journal	1.5/5 stars
Entertainment Weekly	C
MusicHound Rock	4/5 stars
NME	5/10
Pitchfork	0.8/10
Rolling Stone	3/5 stars 4/5 stars
San Francisco Chronicle	3/5 stars
Spin	5/10
The Star-Ledger	3.5/5 stars

Tiny Music elicited a range of critical responses upon release, with some acknowledging its stylistic shift but questioning its coherence and substance. Lorraine Ali of Rolling Stone viewed Tiny Music as the band's most stylistically liberated and best "grunge-free" effort to date, highlighting its "FM zingers and arena stompers". Spin's Charles Aaron of also found merit in the band's reinvention, calling the album "immense fun". In NME, Kitty Empire was more mixed, observing that the band had filled the album with "expectation-confounding" musical detours, but ultimately stated that much of the record "wallow[s] in the sort of dull powerchord toss we've come to expect".

Other critics were more severe in their assessments. David Browne in Entertainment Weekly noted the band's attempts at eclecticism, but concluded that "it's for naught" and led to "a particularly bumpy listen". He ultimately dismissed the album as "faceless corporate rock" and criticized Weiland's lyricism, describing it as "bad poetry in place of insight". Writing for Pitchfork, Ryan Schreiber gave the album a rating of 0.8 out of ten, expressing a sharp disdain for what he saw as "lousy, repetitive riffs" and "wimpy lyrics", and an overall lack of artistic merit. He singled out "Big Bang Baby" for lifting elements from the Rolling Stones' "Jumpin' Jack Flash" and derided Weiland's lyrics as unworthy of serious consideration.

== Legacy ==
Professional ratings
Retrospective reviews
Review scores
Source	Rating
AllMusic	4/5 stars
The A.V. Club	Positive
Encyclopedia of Popular Music	3/5 stars
Pitchfork	7.4/10
The Rolling Stone Album Guide	3/5 stars

Following Weiland's death in 2015, Billy Corgan of the Smashing Pumpkins posited, "It was STP's 3rd album that had got me hooked, a wizardly mix of glam and post-punk, and I confessed to Scott, as well as the band many times, how wrong I'd been in assessing their native brilliance. And like Bowie can and does, it was Scott's phrasing that pushed his music into a unique, and hard to pin down, aesthetic sonicsphere. Lastly, I'd like to share a thought which though clumsy, I hope would please Scott In Hominum. And that is if you asked me who I truly believed were the great voices of our generation, I'd say it were he, Layne, and Kurt."

In 2016, The A.V. Club noted that Tiny Music "was an almost shocking leap forward in creative ambition" and that "[STP] got weirder and better than anyone gives them credit for."

In 2026, Tiny Music was ranked No. 47 on Consequence's list of the top 60 albums of 1996.

== Track listing ==
All lyrics are written by Scott Weiland.

Tiny Music... Songs from the Vatican Gift Shop track listing
No.	Title	Music	Length
1.	"Press Play" (instrumental)	Dean DeLeo; Robert DeLeo; Eric Kretz; Weiland	1:21
2.	"Pop's Love Suicide"	D. DeLeo	3:43
3.	"Tumble in the Rough"	Weiland	3:18
4.	"Big Bang Baby"	R. DeLeo	3:23
5.	"Lady Picture Show"	R. DeLeo	4:08
6.	"And So I Know"	R. DeLeo	3:57
7.	"Trippin' on a Hole in a Paper Heart"	Kretz	2:57
8.	"Art School Girl"	R. DeLeo; Weiland	3:35
9.	"Adhesive"	R. DeLeo	5:34
10.	"Ride the Cliché"	D. DeLeo	3:17
11.	"Daisy" (instrumental)	R. DeLeo	2:18
12.	"Seven Caged Tigers"	D. DeLeo	4:17
Total length:			41:55

Note: "Press Play" has a length of 4:27 on LP reissues.

== Personnel ==
Credits adapted from the album's liner notes.

Stone Temple Pilots

- Scott Weiland – lead vocals, percussion on "Press Play"
- Dean DeLeo – guitar, bass on "Press Play" and "Big Bang Baby"
- Robert DeLeo – bass, guitar on "Press Play", "And So I Know" and "Daisy"; vibraphone and electric harpsichord on "And So I Know"; percussion on "And So I Know"
- Eric Kretz – drums, percussion on "Pop's Love Suicide", "Lady Picture Show", "And So I Know", and "Art School Girl"

Additional personnel

- Brendan O'Brien – producer, mixing, piano on "Press Play" and "Big Bang Baby"; percussion on "Pop's Love Suicide", "Lady Picture Show", "Art School Girl" and "Seven Caged Tigers"; organ and clavinet on "Art School Girl"
- Dave Ferguson – trumpet on "Adhesive"
- Nick DiDia – recording engineer
- Caram Costanzo – 2nd engineer
- Chris Goss – vocal engineer
- Tracy Chisholm – vocal engineer
- Stephen Marcussen – mastering
- Ron Boustead – digital editing
- John Eder – photography
- John Heiden – art direction

== Charts ==
=== Weekly charts ===
Chart (1996)	Peak position
Australian Albums (ARIA)	3
Austrian Albums (Ö3 Austria)	37
Canada Top Albums/CDs (RPM)	5
German Albums (Offizielle Top 100)	47
Finnish Albums (Suomen virallinen lista)	18
New Zealand Albums (RMNZ)	4
Norwegian Albums (VG-lista)	27
Swedish Albums (Sverigetopplistan)	27
Swiss Albums (Schweizer Hitparade)	41
Scottish Albums (Official Charts)	44
UK Albums (Official Charts)	31
UK Rock & Metal Albums (Official Charts)	2
US Billboard 200	4

Chart (2021)	Peak position
Hungarian Albums (MAHASZ)	29

=== Year-end charts ===
Chart (1996)	Position
New Zealand Albums (RMNZ)	35
US Billboard 200	41

=== Singles ===
Year	Single	Mainstream Rock Tracks	Modern Rock Tracks	CAN Alternative 30
1996	"Big Bang Baby"	1	2	1
1996	"Trippin' on a Hole in a Paper Heart"	1	3	1
1996	"Lady Picture Show"	1	6	2
1996	"Tumble in the Rough"	9	36	23

== Certifications ==
Region	Certification	Certified units/sales
Australia (ARIA)	Gold	35,000^{^}
Canada (Music Canada)	Platinum	100,000^{^}
New Zealand (RMNZ)	Gold	7,500^{^}
United States (RIAA)	2× Platinum	2,000,000^{^}
^{^} Shipments figures based on certification alone.
