= Expo 86 =

World's Fair held in Vancouver, British Columbia, Canada

1986 Vancouver
- The Expo 86 logo

Overview
- BIE-class: Specialized exposition
- Category: International specialized exposition
- Name: 1986 World Exposition on Transportation and Communication
- Motto: "World in Motion – World in Touch"
- Building(s): BC Place Stadium, Canada Place, Science World (Vancouver)
- Area: 70 hectares (170 acres)
- Visitors: 22,111,578
- Mascot: Expo Ernie

Participant(s)
- Countries: 54

Location
- Country: Canada
- City: Vancouver
- Venue: BC Place Stadium, Canada Place, Plaza of Nations, Expo Centre
- Coordinates: 49°17′19.1″N 123°6′40″W

Timeline
- Bidding: 1979
- Awarded: November 1980
- Opening: May 2, 1986
- Closure: October 13, 1986

Specialized expositions
- Previous: Expo '85 in Tsukuba
- Next: World Expo 88 in Brisbane

Universal expositions
- Previous: Expo '70 in Osaka
- Next: Seville Expo '92 in Seville

Horticultural expositions
- Previous: International Garden Festival in Liverpool
- Next: Expo '90 in Osaka

The 1986 World Exposition on Transportation and Communication, or simply Expo 86, was a world's fair held in Vancouver, British Columbia, Canada from May 2 until October 13, 1986. The fair, the theme of which was "Transportation and Communication: World in Motion – World in Touch", coincided with Vancouver's centennial and was held on the north shore of False Creek.

It was the second time that Canada held a world's fair, the first being Expo 67 in Montreal (during the Canadian Centennial). It was also the third world's fair to be held in the Pacific Northwest in the previous 24 years as of 1986 and to date, it still stands as the last world's fair to be held in North America.

It was a great success, drawing over 22 million visitors, double that of Knoxville in 1982 and three times that of Louisiana in 1984.

== History ==
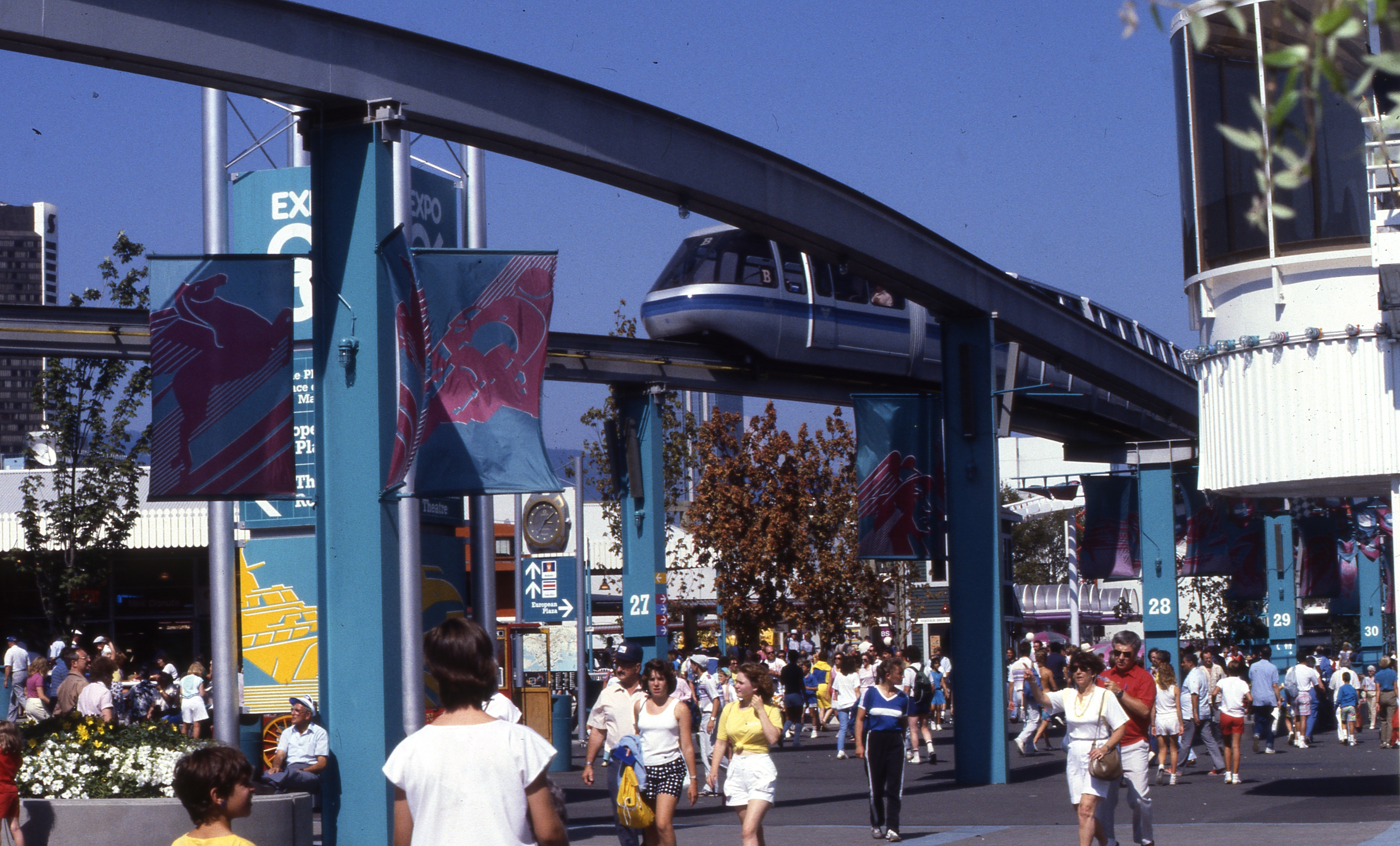
The monorail at Expo 86. After the site closed, it was shipped to England where it was installed at the Alton Towers theme park in 1987.

The logo of three interlocking rings to make the 86 in the logo stood for the three main modes of transportation; land, air, and water.

=== Background ===
Up until the late 1970s, the 173 acres (70 ha) site on False Creek, where Expo was staged, was a former CPR rail yard and an industrial wasteland. In 1978, Sam Bawlf (then BC Minister of Recreation and Conservation) proposed an exposition to celebrate Vancouver's centennial year (1986). The proposal was submitted in June 1979 for a fair that was to be called "Transpo 86." In 1980, the British Columbia Legislature passed the Transpo 86 Corporation Act, paving the way for the fair. The transportation theme reflected the city's role in connecting Canada by rail, its status as a major port and transportation hub, and the role of transportation in communications.

The initial idea was to have "a modest $80 million transportation exposition that would mark Vancouver's 100th anniversary." It soon blossomed into a full exposition, thanks to the help of the Vancouver Exposition Commissioner-General at that time, Patrick Reid. The theme of Transportation and Communication led to the conglomeration of multiple different exhibits of transportation networks. This included a 3.5-mile (5.6 km) monorail line that glided over the crowds included a trip to every zone. Other ground transports included the SkyTrain, a High Speed Surface Transport from Japan, and a French "People Mover." The transport of the sky was the Gondola, a boxcar hovering high in the air. The water taxis moved along four different ports on the site.

The fair was awarded to Vancouver by the Bureau International des Expositions (BIE) in November 1980. However, once it became clear that the event would be a world exposition, the name was officially changed to "Expo 86" by Ambassador and Commissioner General Patrick Reid in October 1981, and, by the end of the year, Expo 86 Corporation was established as a nonprofit agency responsible in the planning and operation of the fair. Local business tycoon Jim Pattison was appointed as CEO, and would eventually also become the president of the corporation. The chief architect selected was Bruno Freschi, the Creative Director was Ron Woodall, and Bob Smith was responsible for the production and design.

Construction started in October 1983, when Queen Elizabeth II, Queen of Canada, started a concrete mixer on the future site of the Canada Pavilion, and offered the "invitation to the world." However, work was disrupted by labour disputes for five months. Still, Expo Centre opened May 2, 1985, as a preview centre for the fair.

The fair was originally budgeted for CAN$78 million. However, final expenditures for the expanded event totalled $802 million, with a deficit of CAN$311 million.

==== Evictions ====
As the city prepared to welcome an influx of visitors, more than a thousand low-income residents of Vancouver's Downtown Eastside were evicted from their long-term homes in single room occupancy (SRO) hotels, sometimes with as little as a single day's notice. Because tenants were subject to British Columbia's Innkeeper's Act rather than the laws governing typical landlords and renters, the SRO owners were not required to give significant notice, or even written notice, of an eviction. Mike Harcourt, the city's mayor at the time, hoped provincial laws might be changed to protect these residents, but the provincial government refused. The Patricia Hotel was among those establishments that evicted most or all of its residents, including a Norwegian man named Olaf Solheim. Solheim, who had lived at the Patricia Hotel for decades, was well known in the community but was evicted with just a week's notice. Although he found a new home, he became despondent, stopped eating, and died within a month. Vancouver's chief medical health officer at the time, John Blatherwick, publicly asserted that the sudden eviction could be the cause of Solheim's death: "He'd been moved from where he was to a place he didn't want to be, and he simply lost his will to live and he died."

=== Fair ===
Expo 86 was opened by The Prince and Princess of Wales, and Prime Minister Brian Mulroney on Friday, May 2, 1986. It featured pavilions from 54 nations and multiple corporations. Expo's participants were given the opportunity to design their own pavilion or opt for the less expensive Expo module. Each module was approximately two-and-a-half stories high and had the floor space equal to a third of a city block. The design was such that any number of the square modules could be placed together in a variety of shapes. The roof design allowed the interior exhibit space to be uninterrupted by pillars.

This world's fair was categorized as a "Class II", or "specialized exhibition," reflecting its specific emphases on transportation and communications.

The fair was known for the unfortunate ill-timing of the themes of both the United States and the Soviet Union pavilions. The U.S. pavilion centred around the country's space program. However, it had been less than four months after NASA had its worst disaster when the Space Shuttle Challenger exploded shortly after takeoff. The Soviet Union had an even more problematic theme: it celebrated the country's nuclear industry. But less than a week before the fair opening ceremonies, the Chernobyl nuclear disaster occurred.

== Pavilions ==
=== Canadian provinces and territories ===
Canadian provinces and territories

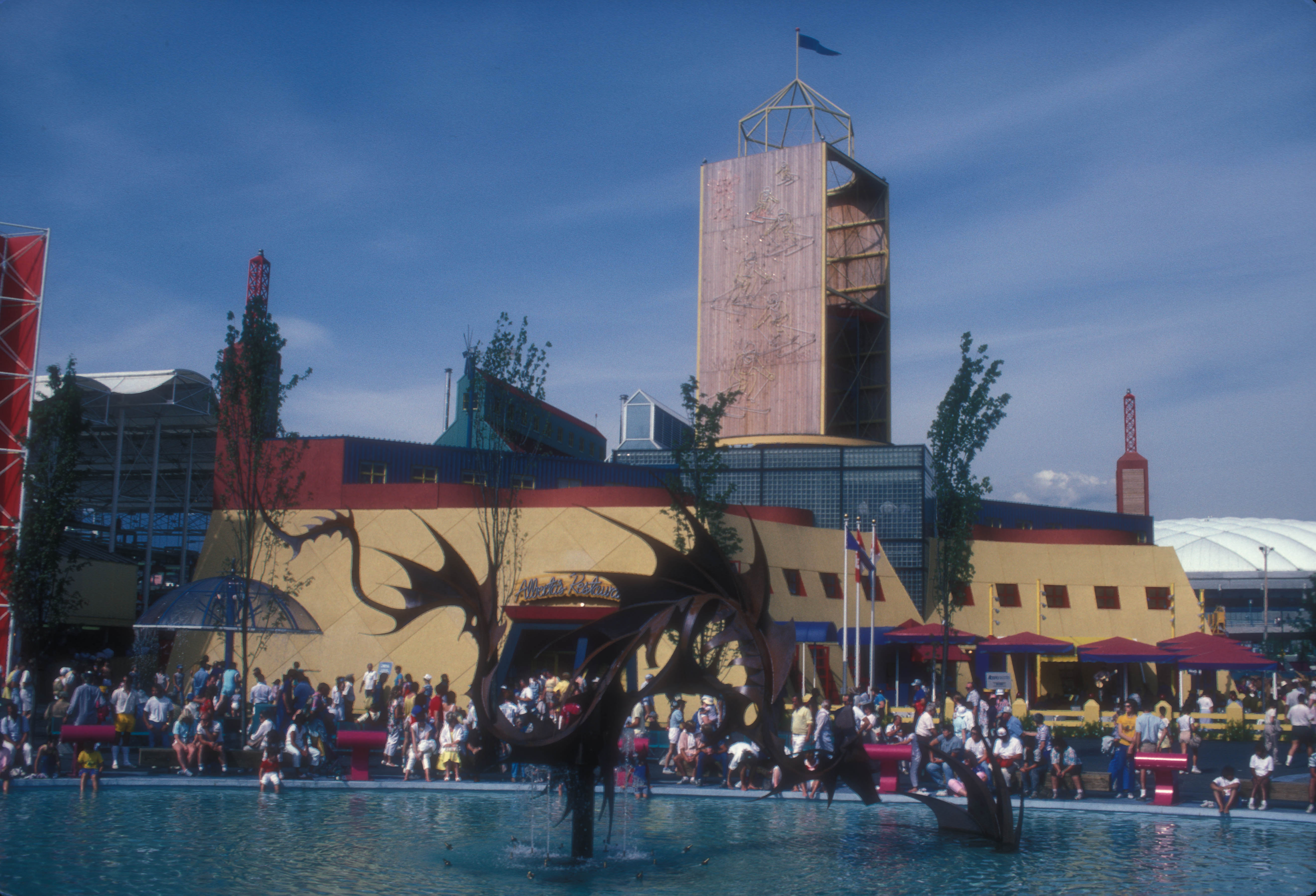
Alberta

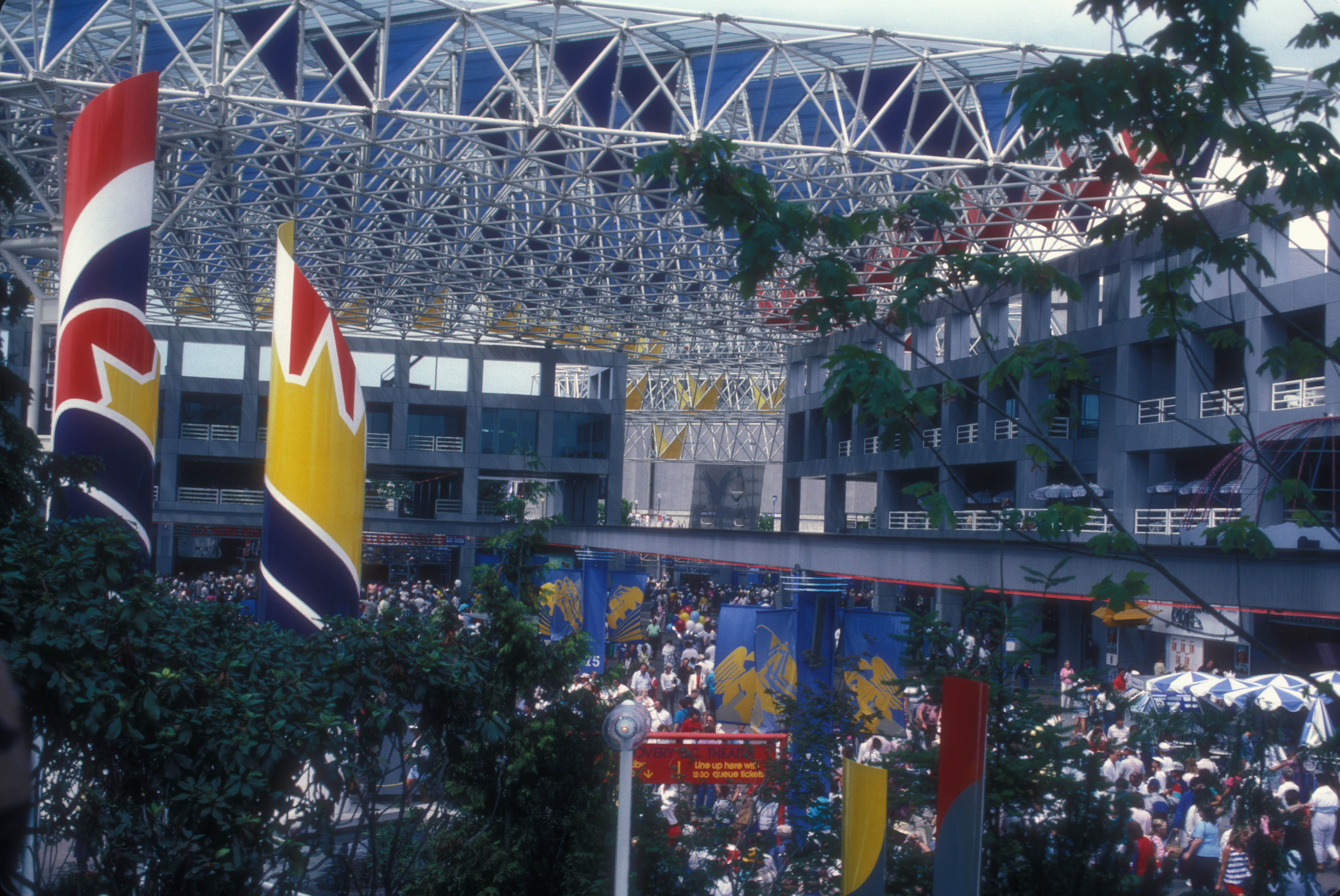
British Columbia

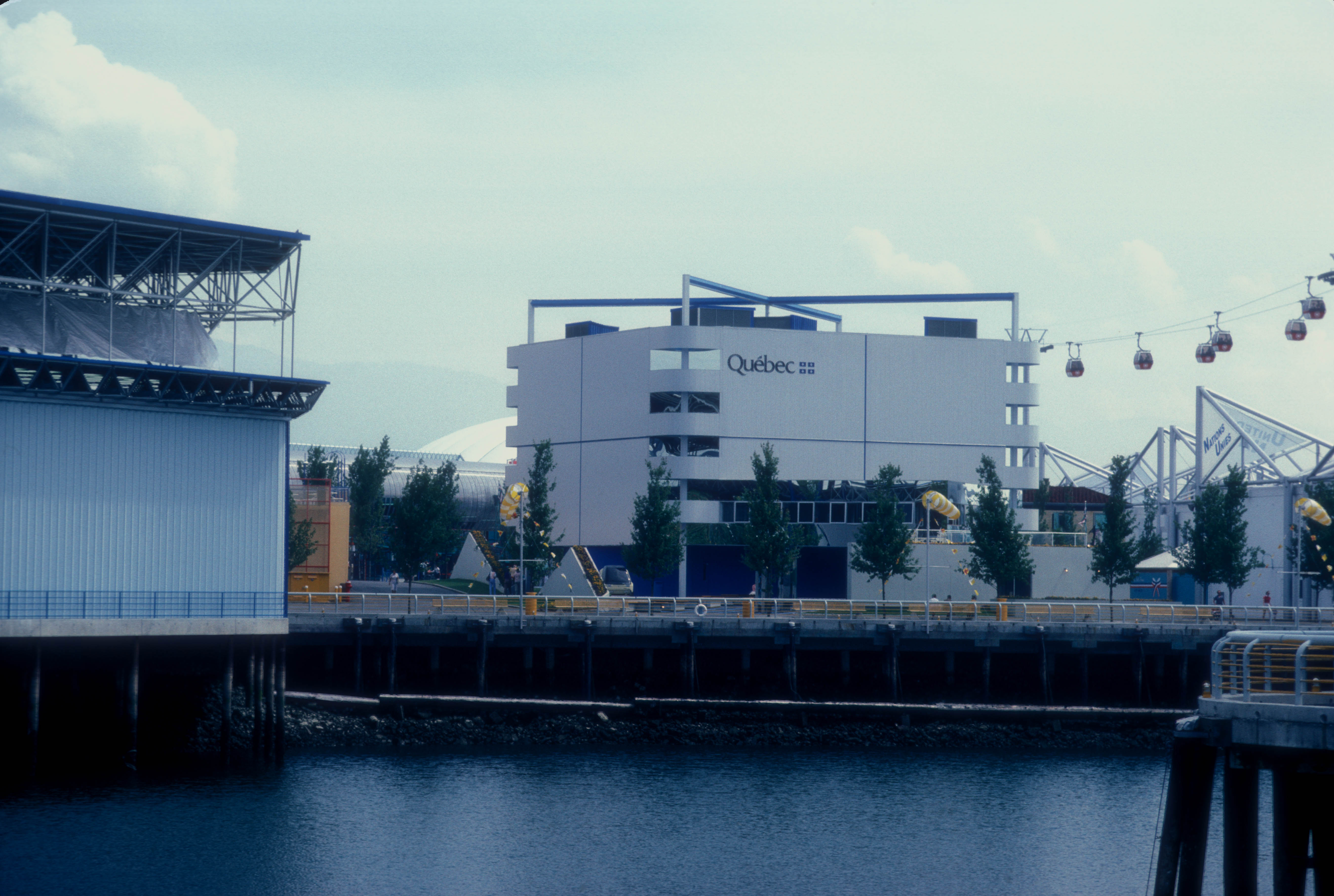
Quebec

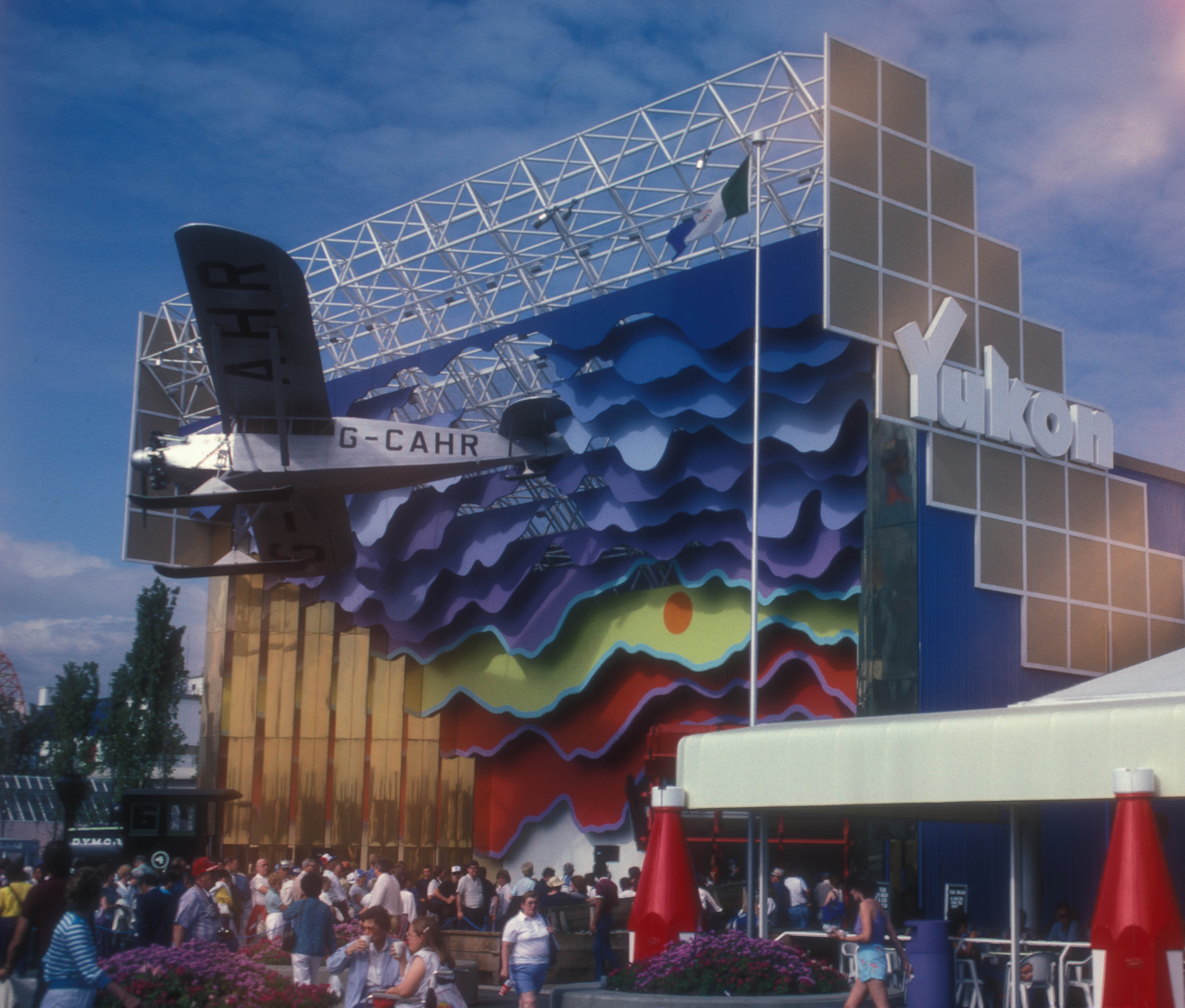
Yukon

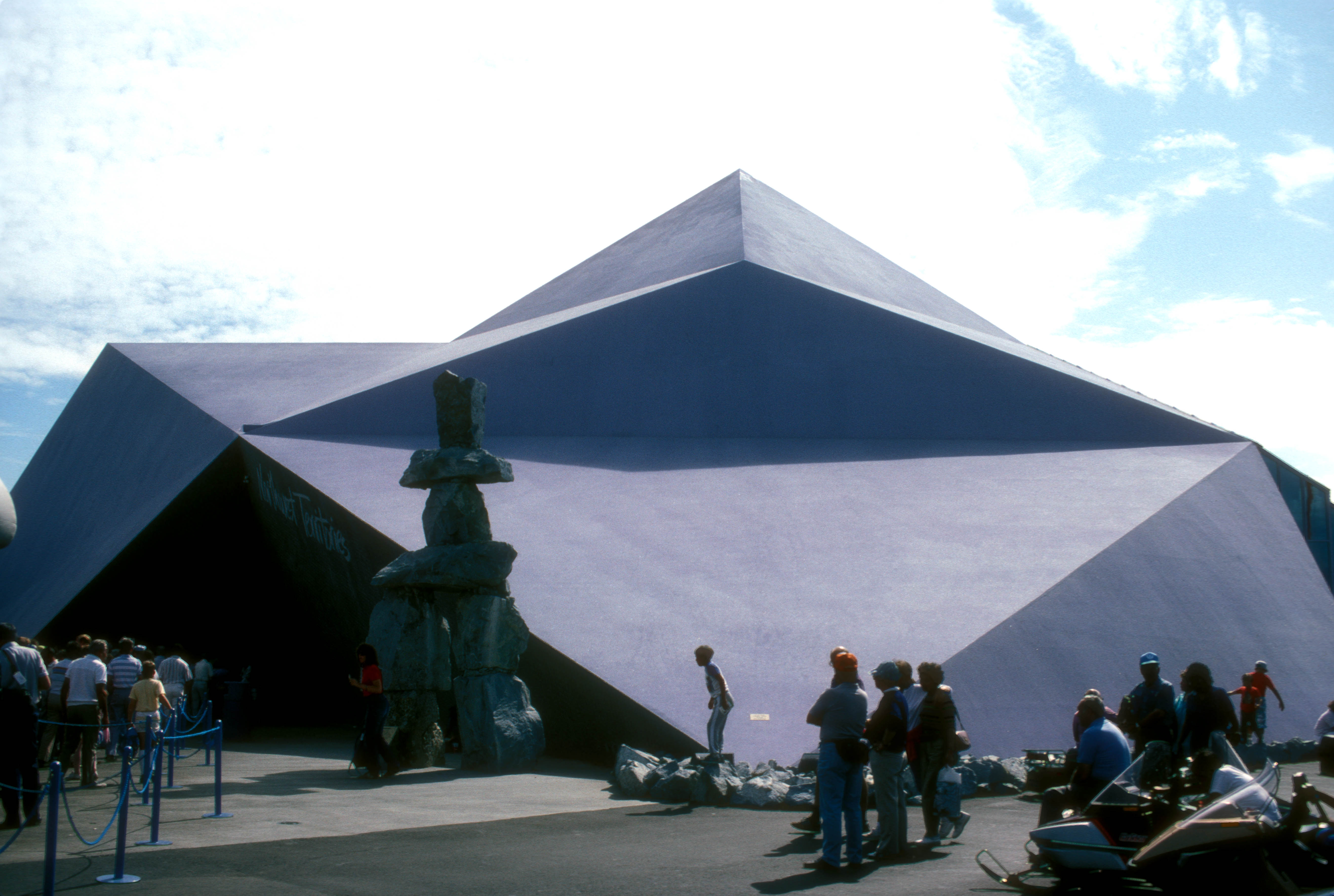
Northwest Territories

Not pictured: •Nova Scotia •Ontario •Prince Edward Island •Saskatchewan

=== Countries and international organizations ===
Countries and international organizations

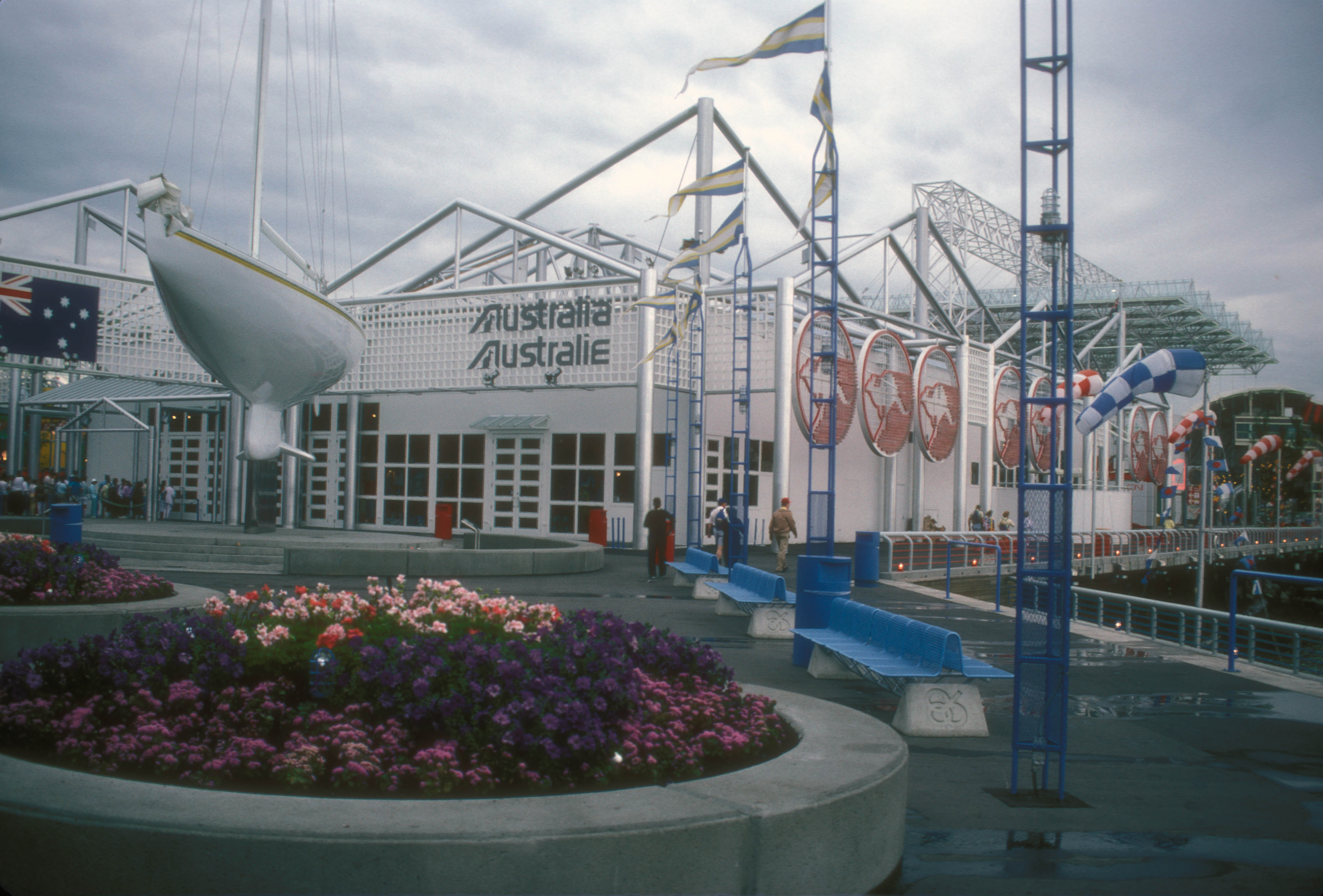
Australia

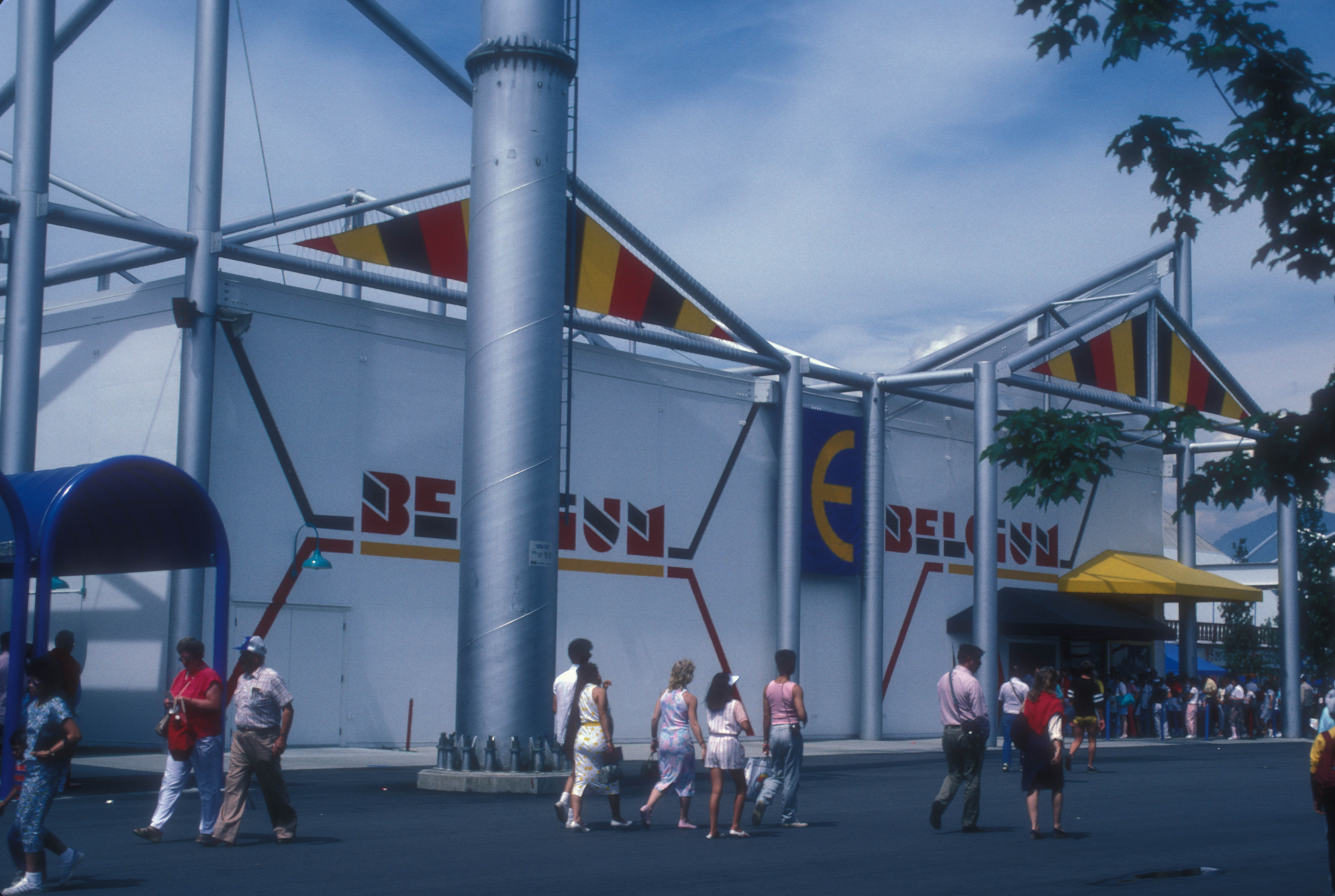
Belgium

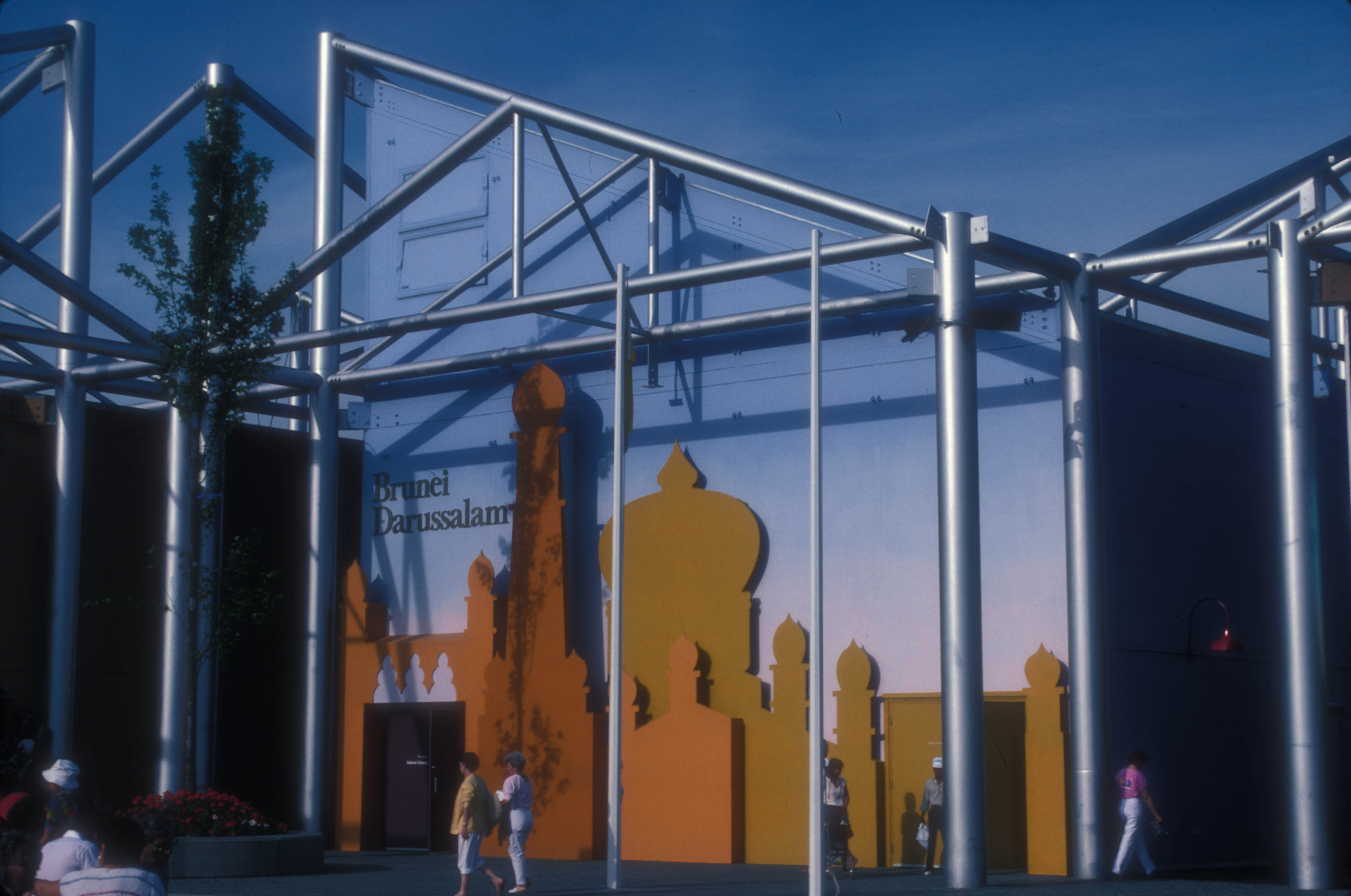
Brunei Darussalam

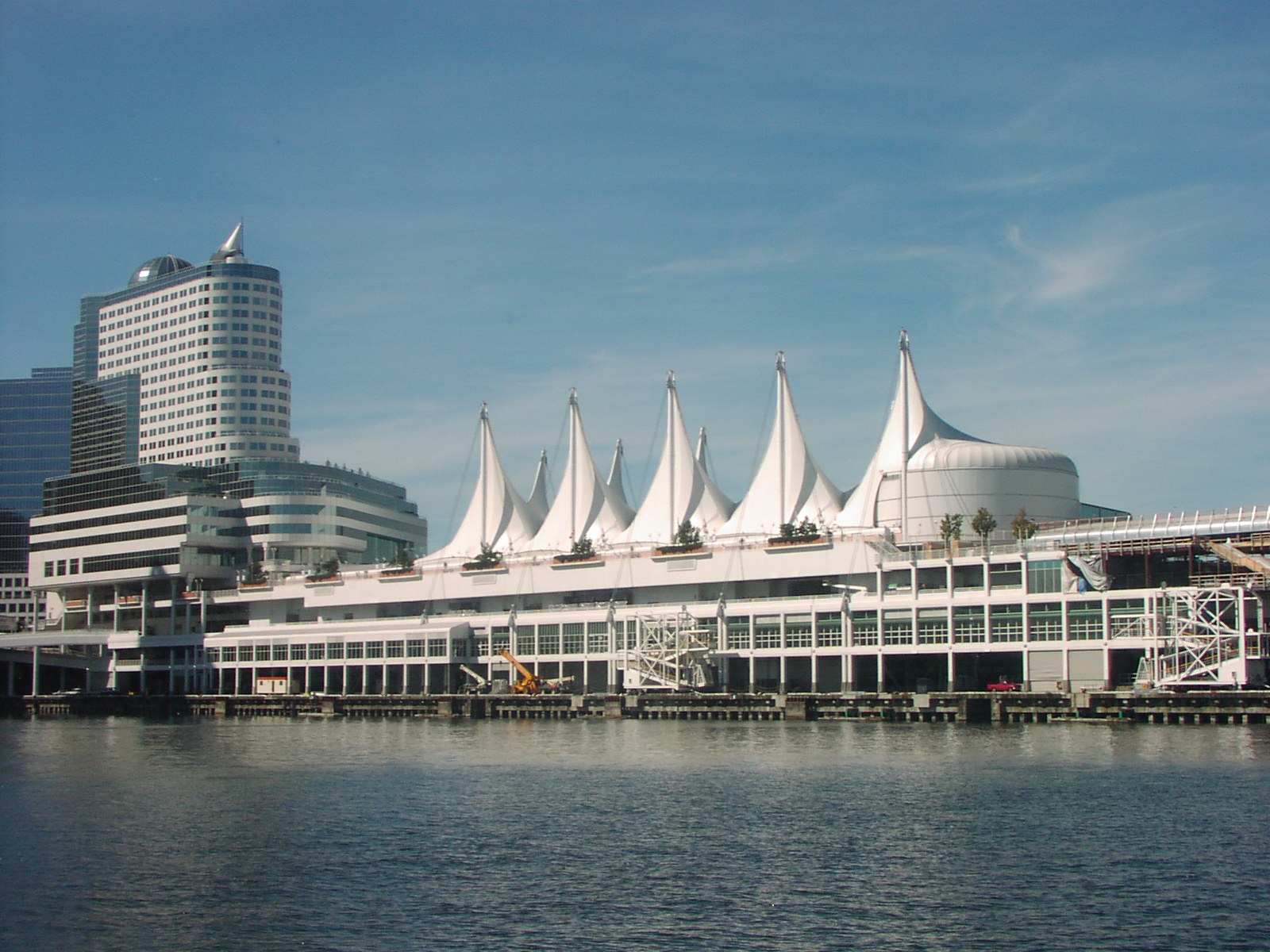
Canada

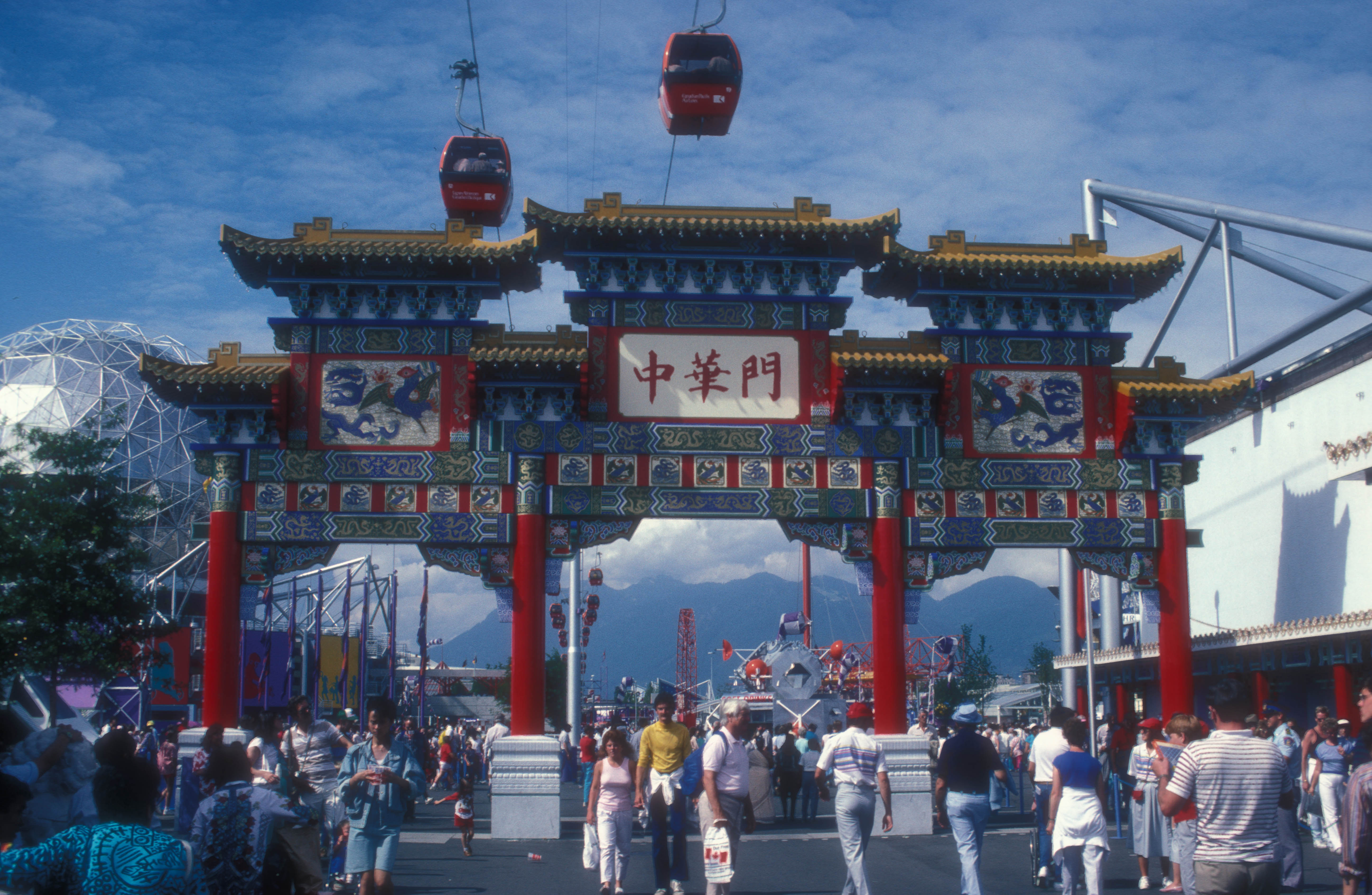
China

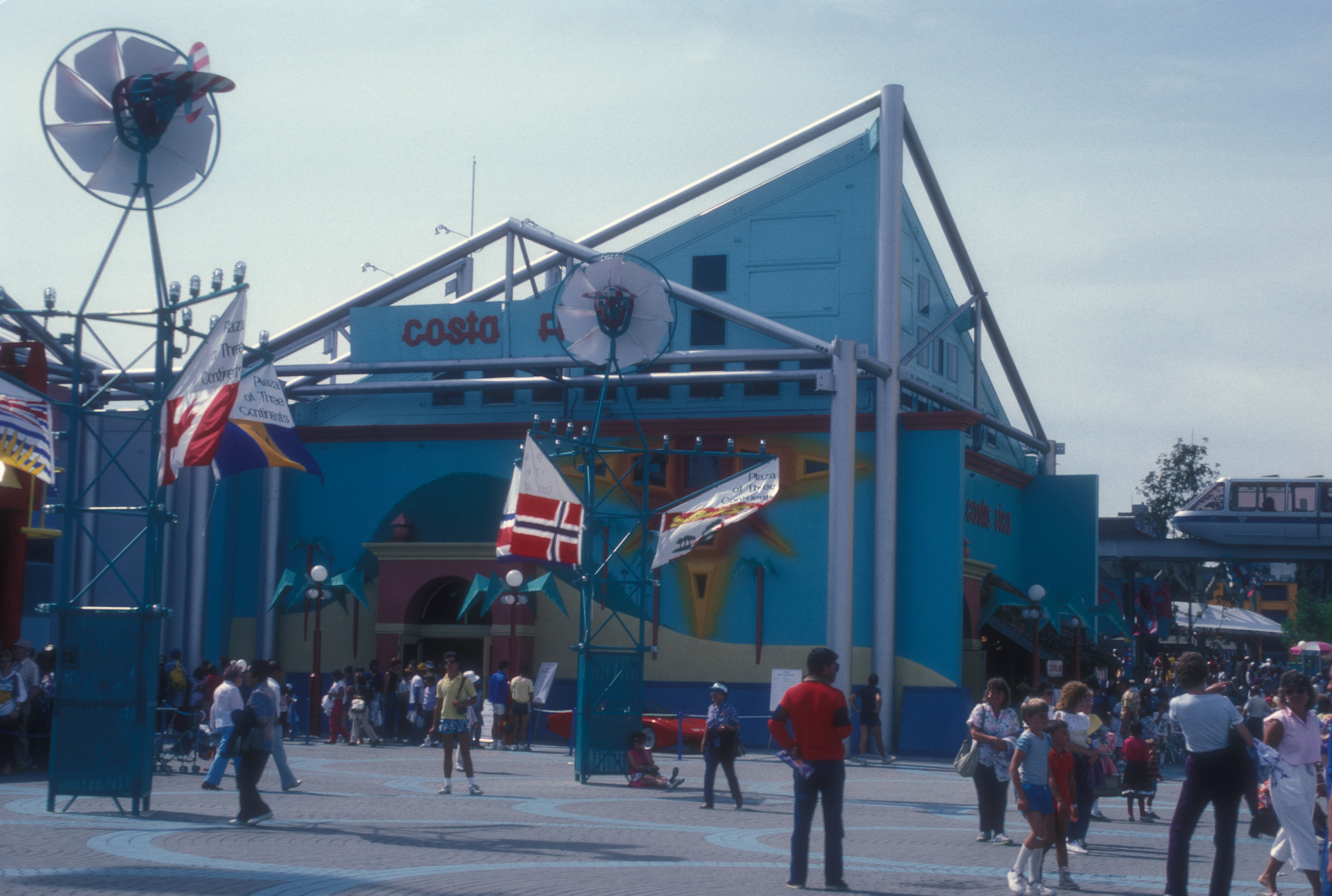
Costa Rica

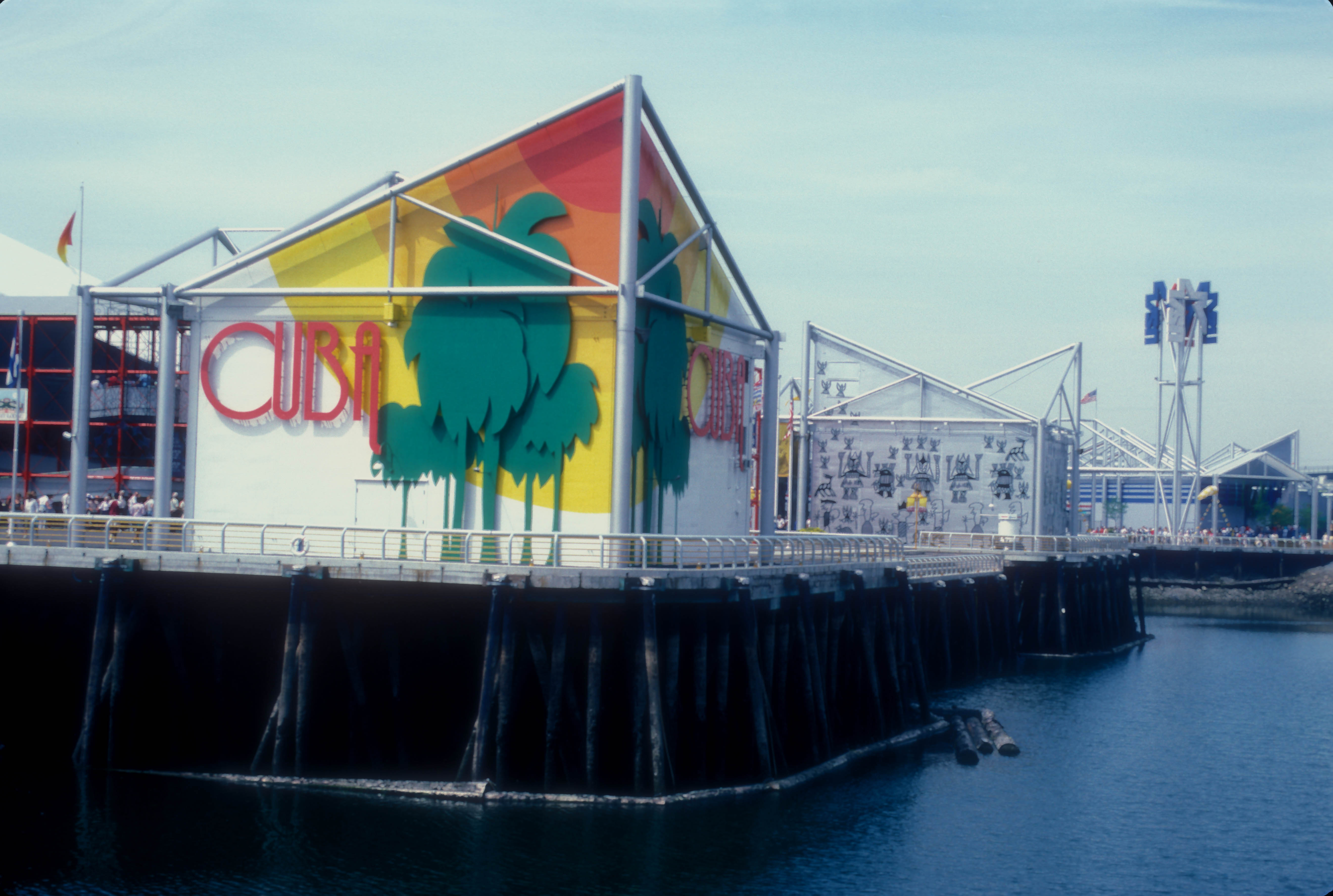
Cuba

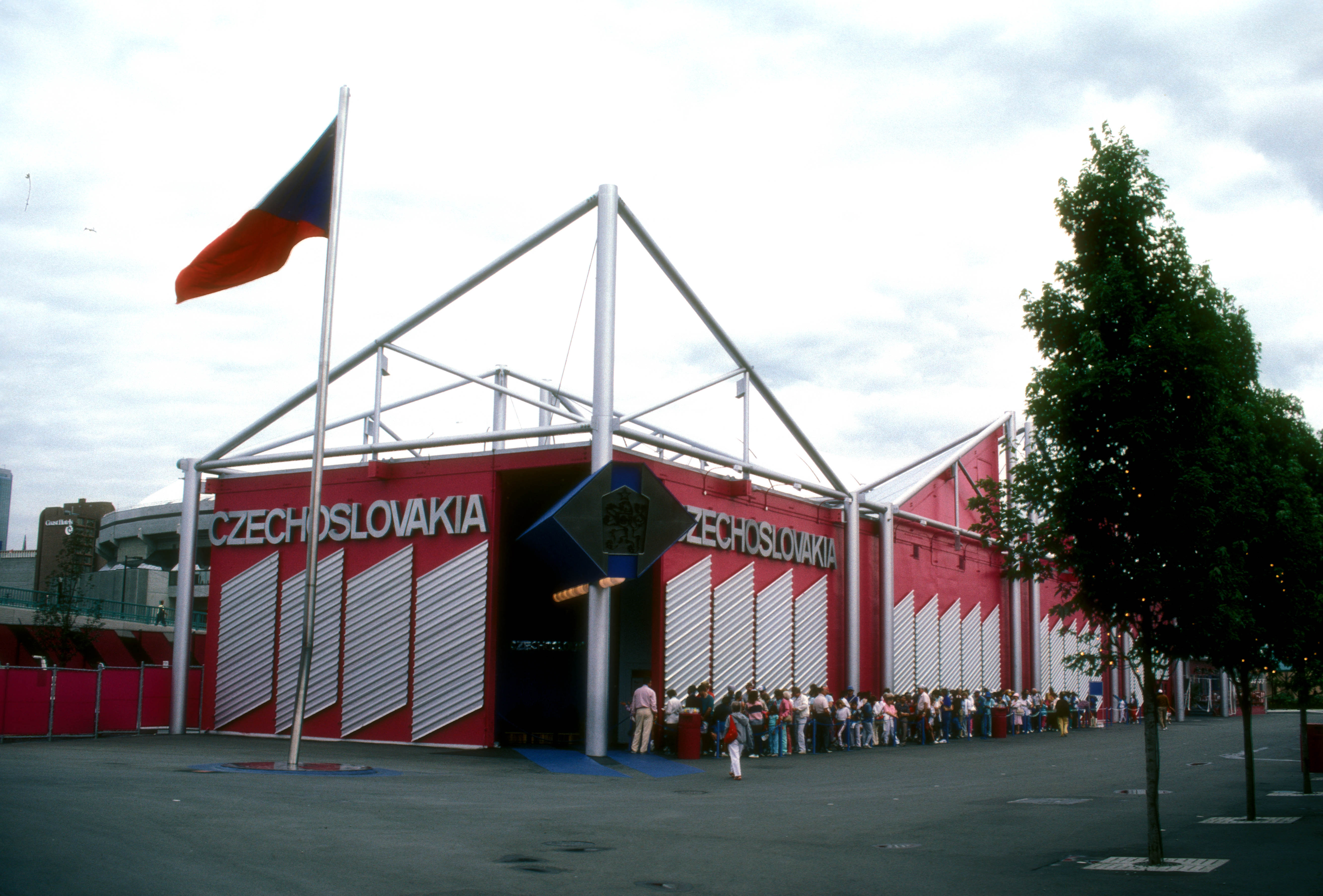
Czechoslovakia

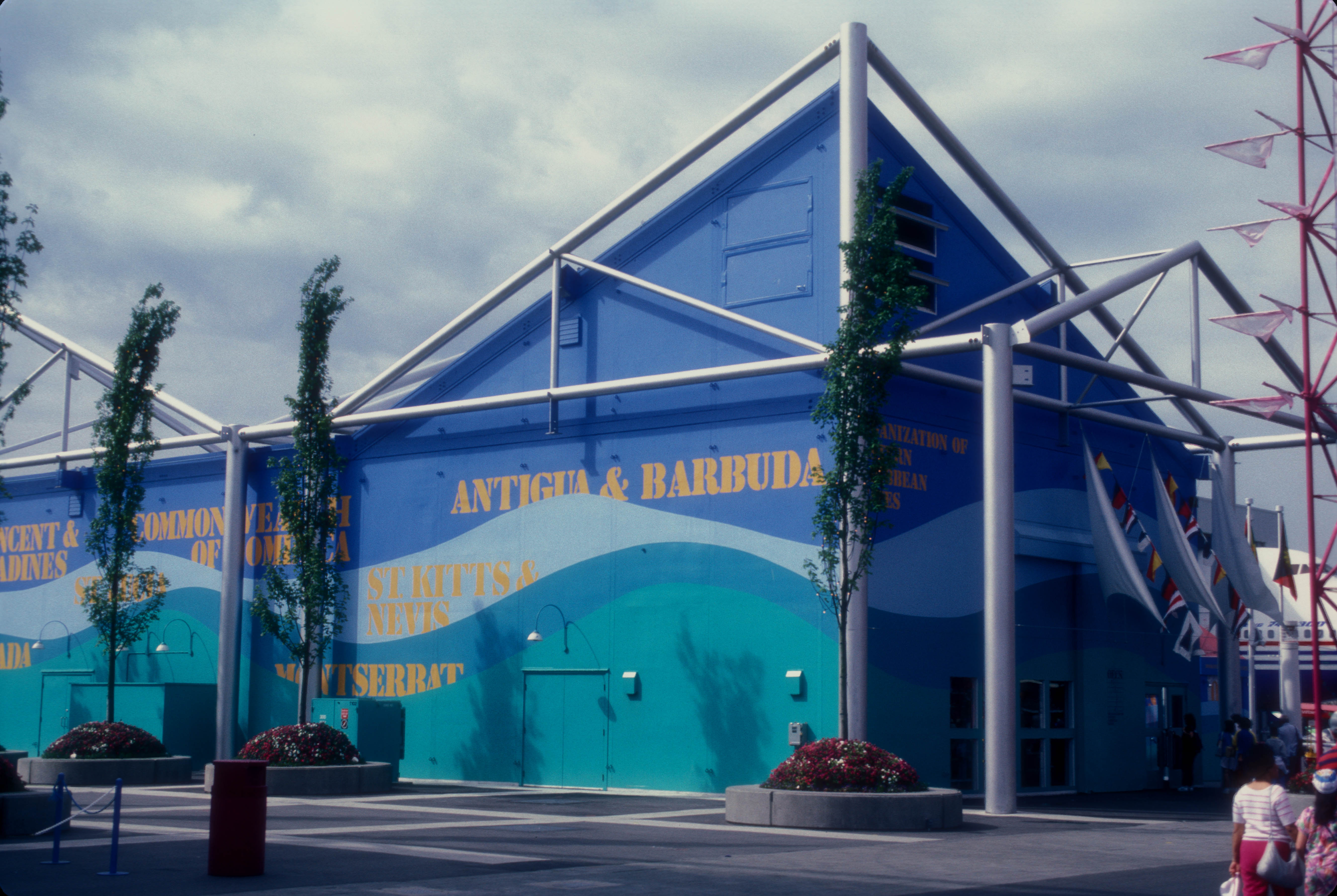
Eastern Caribbean Nations

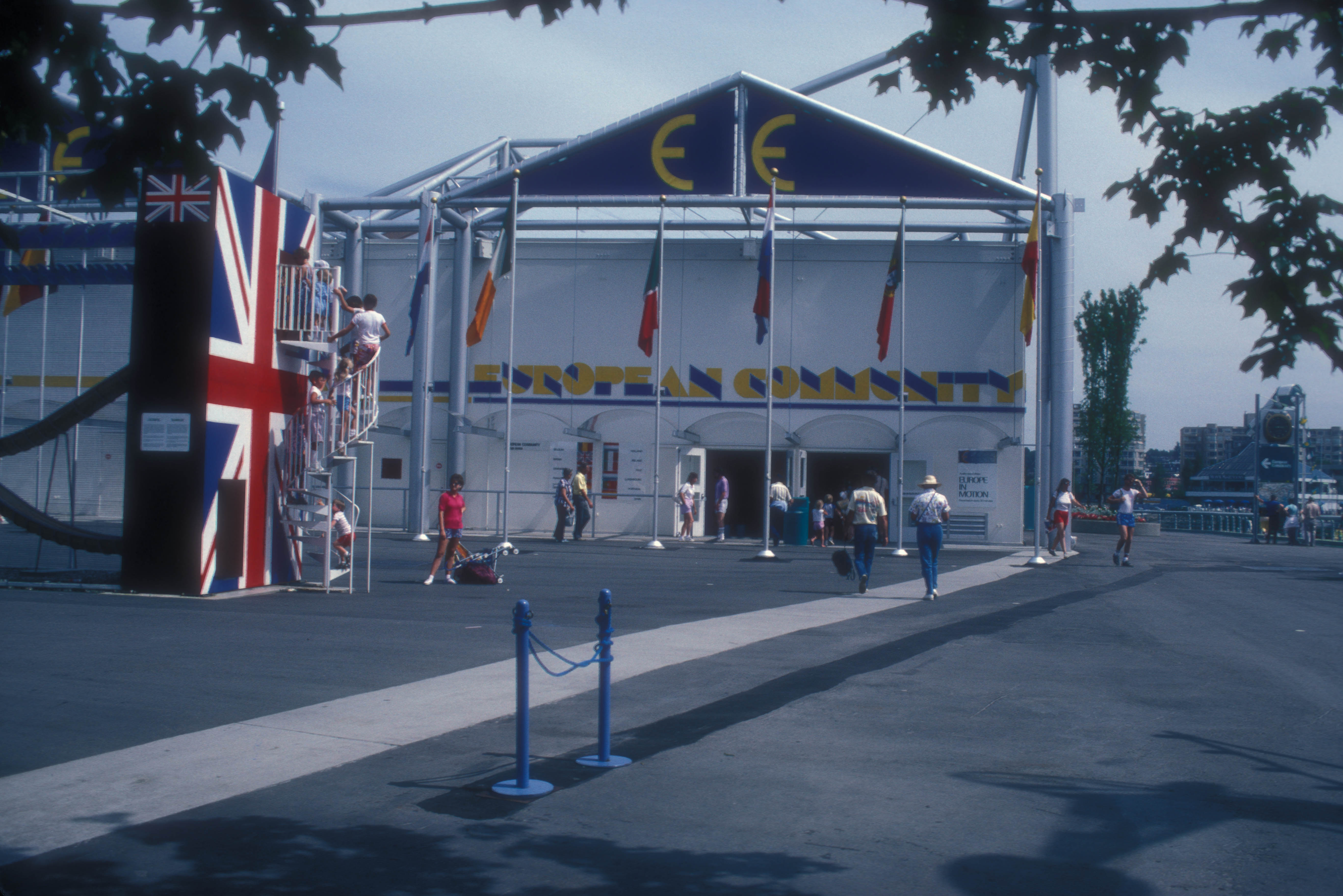
European Community

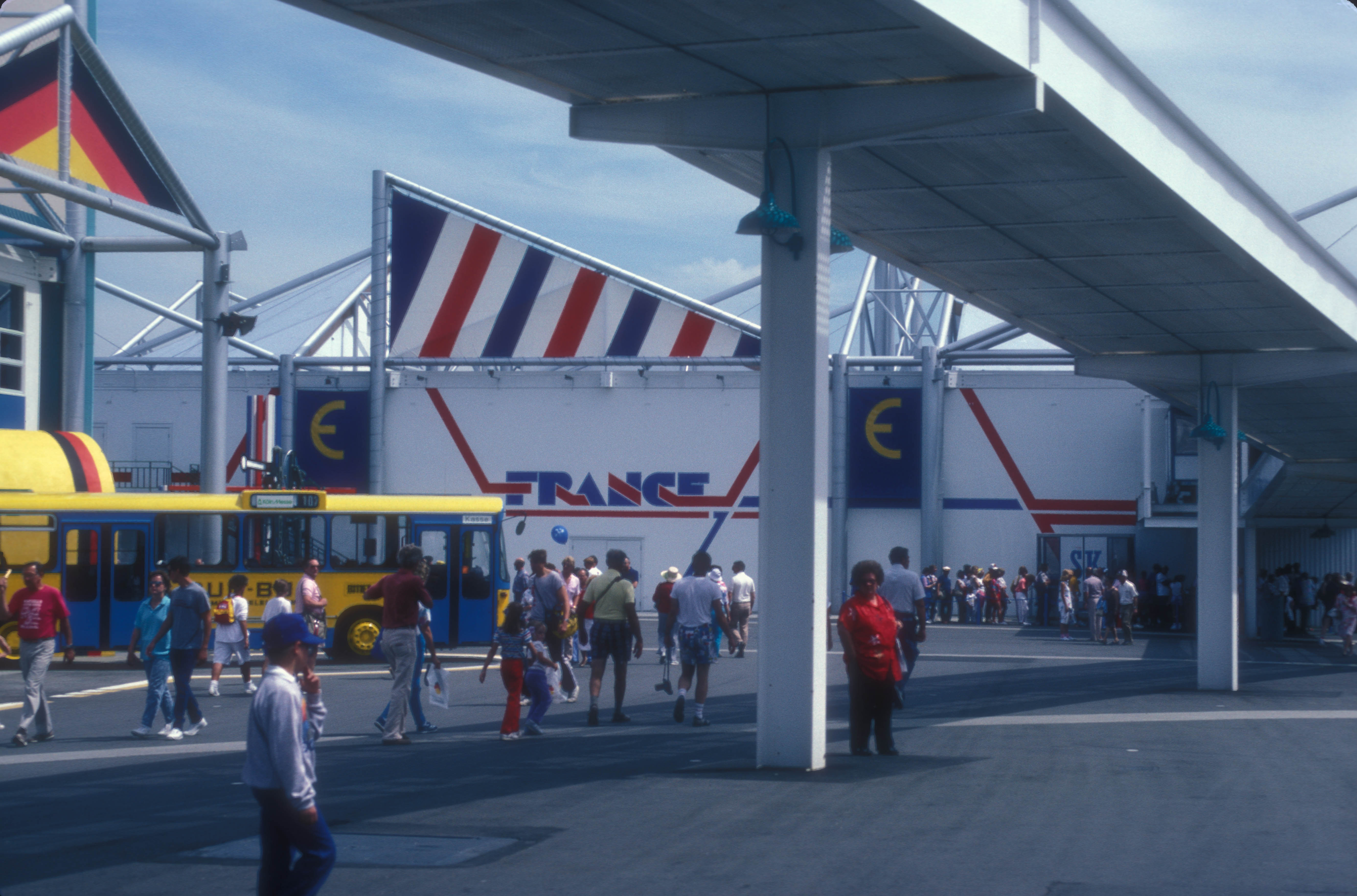
France

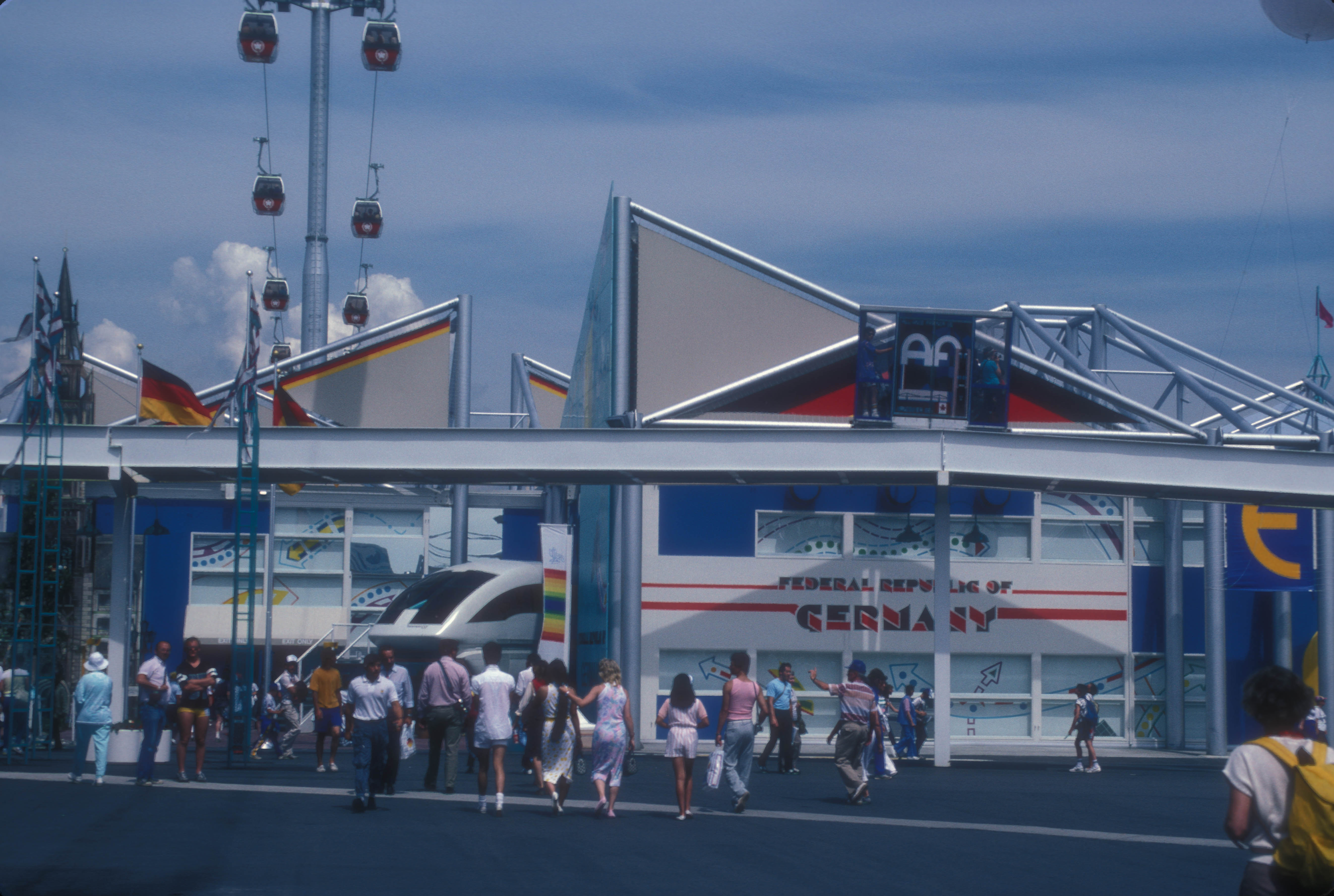
West Germany

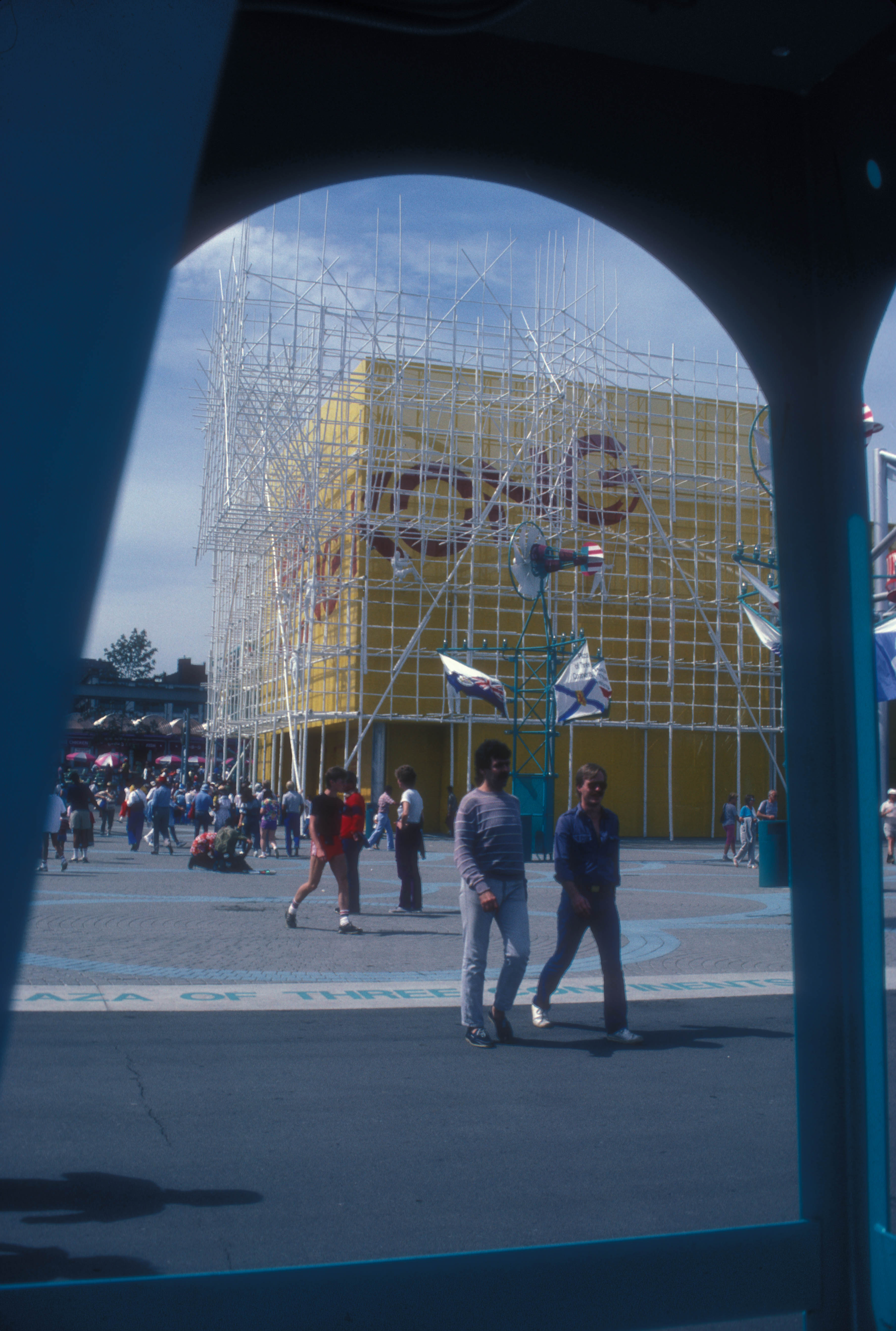
Hong Kong

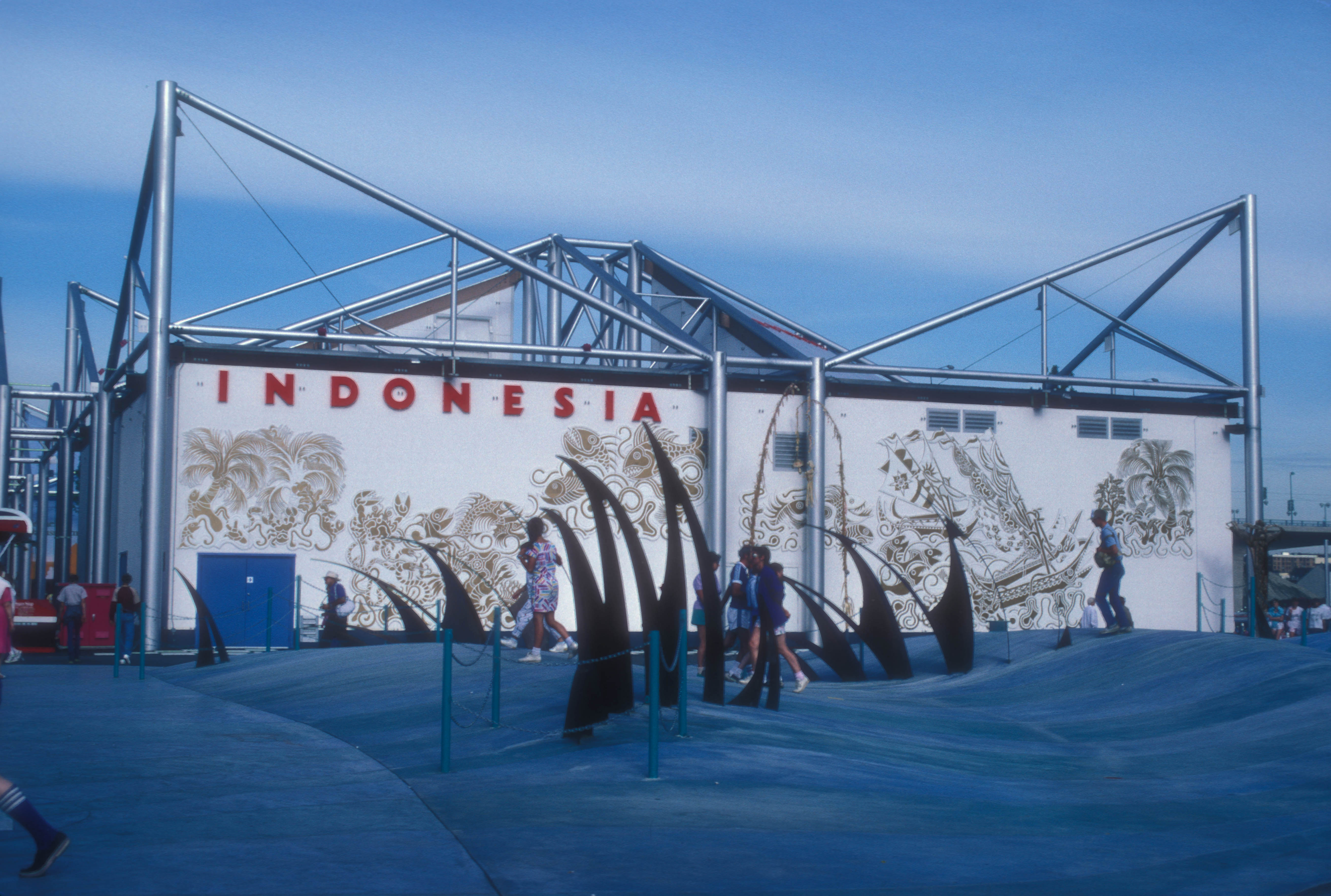
Indonesia

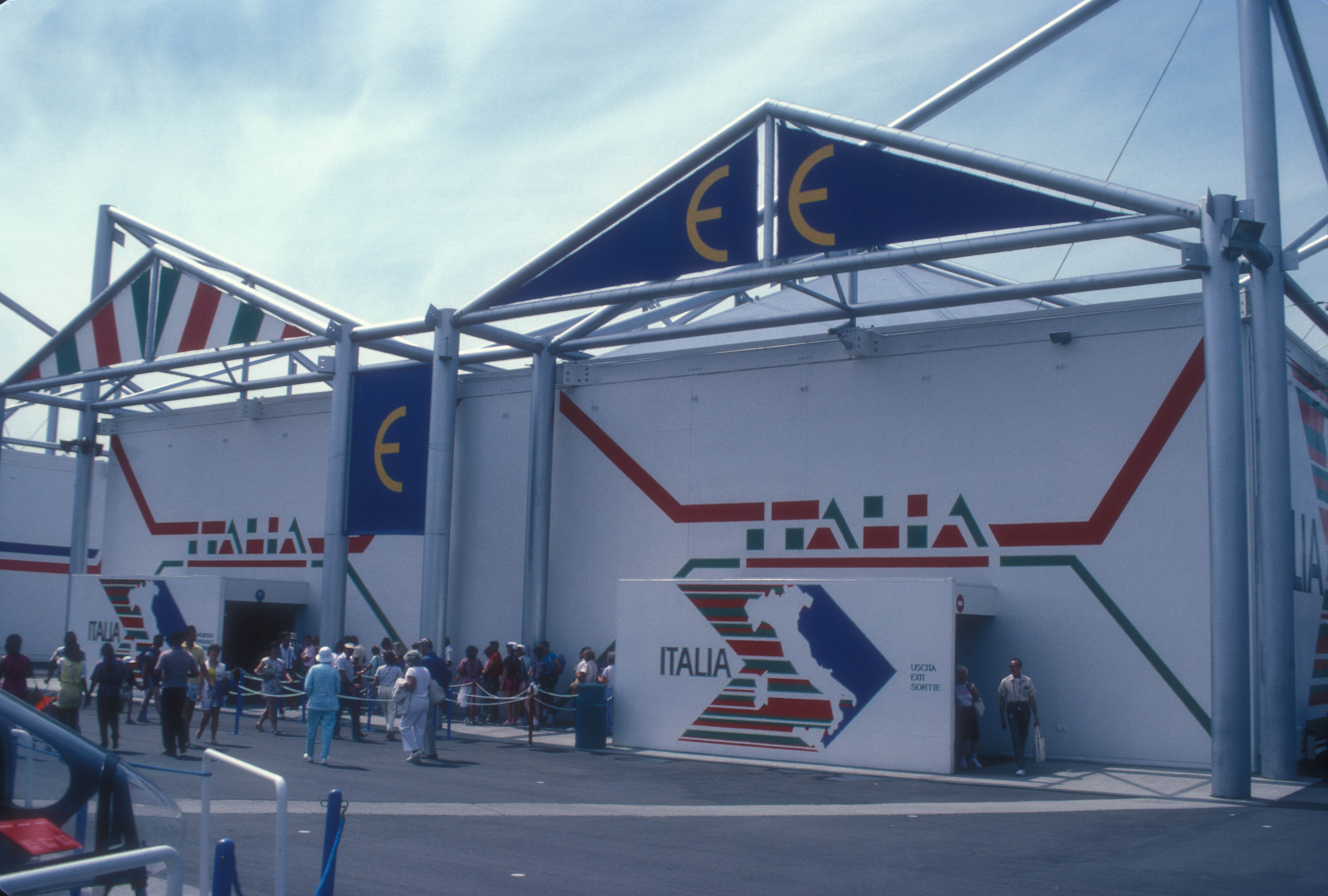
Italy

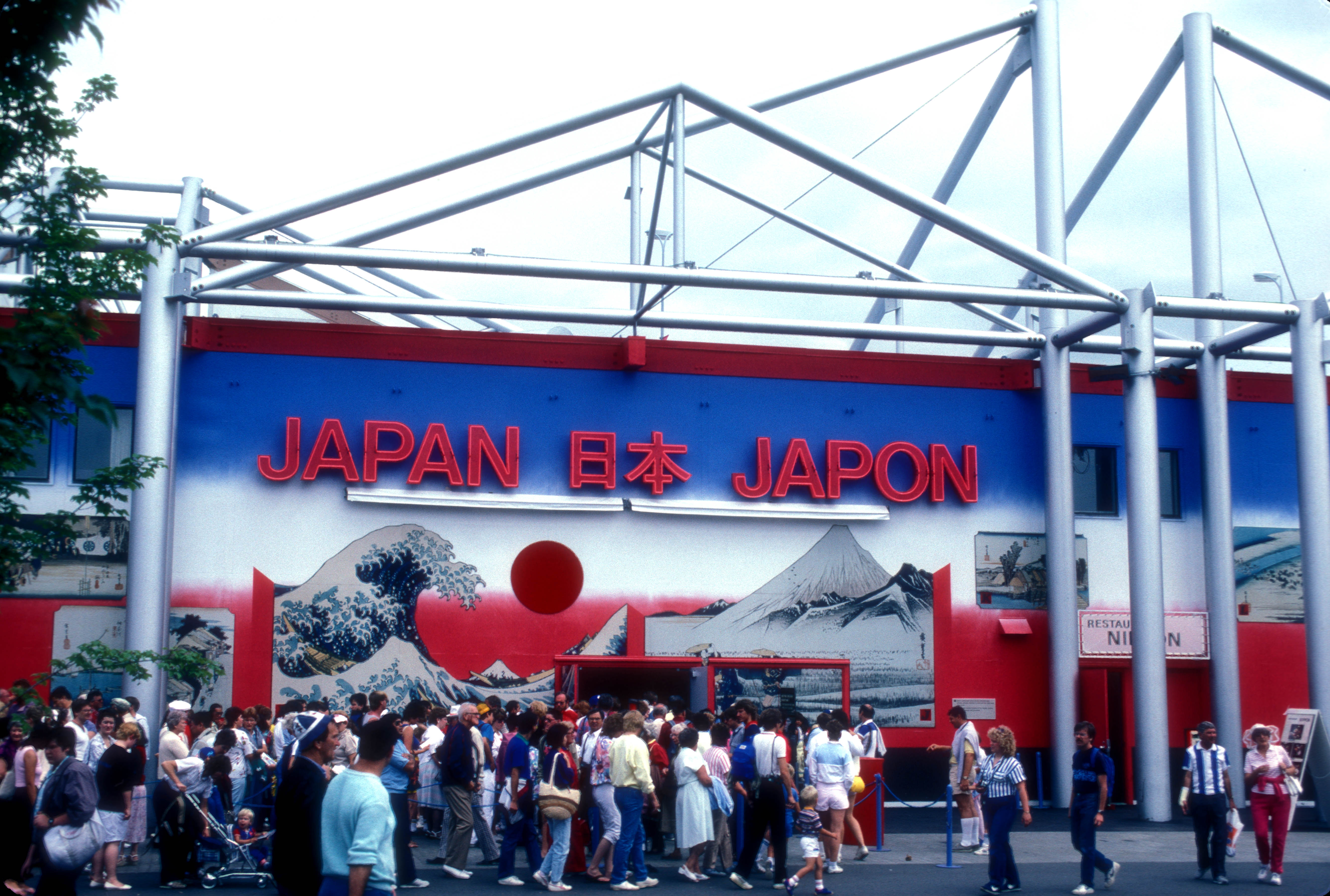
Japan

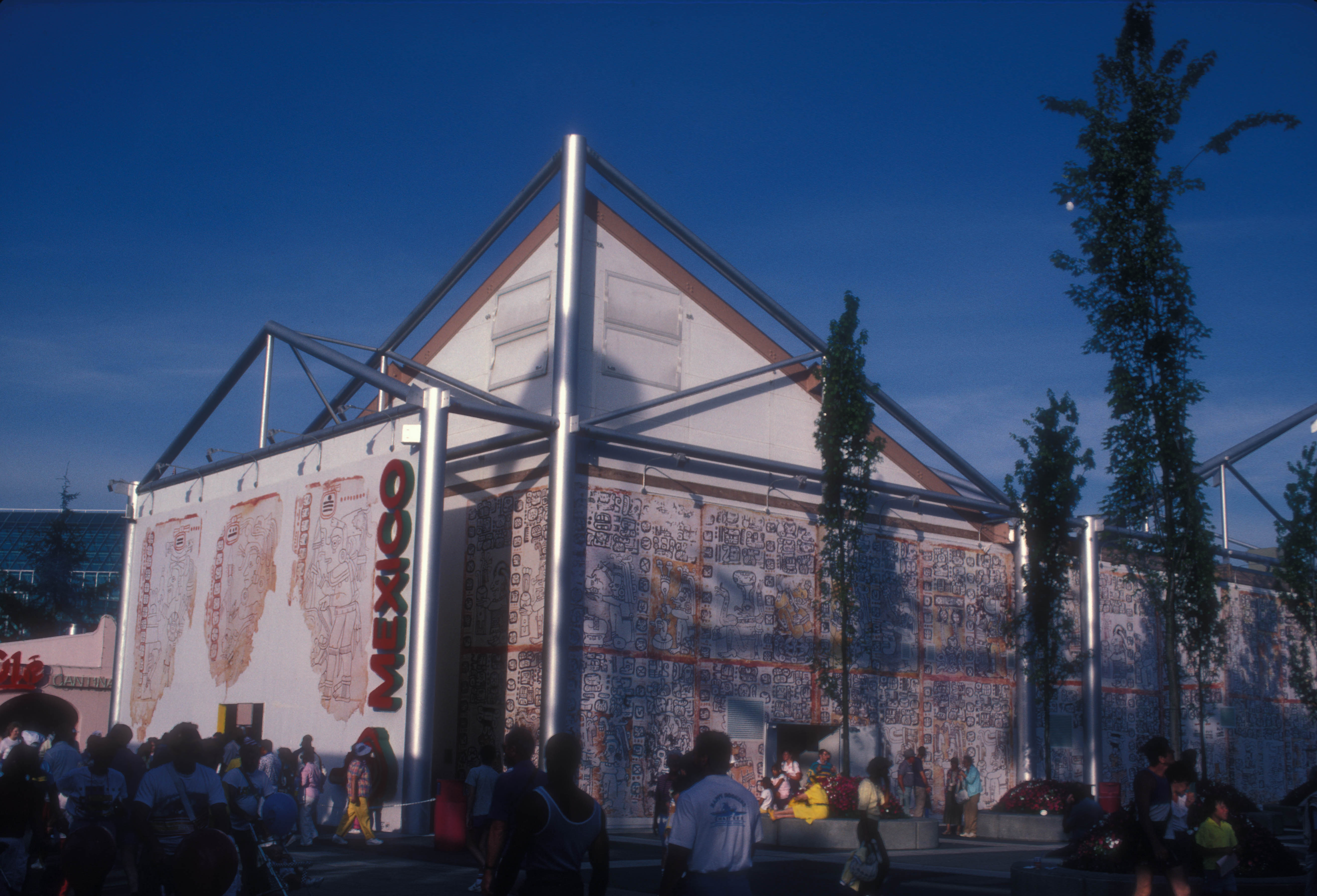
Mexico

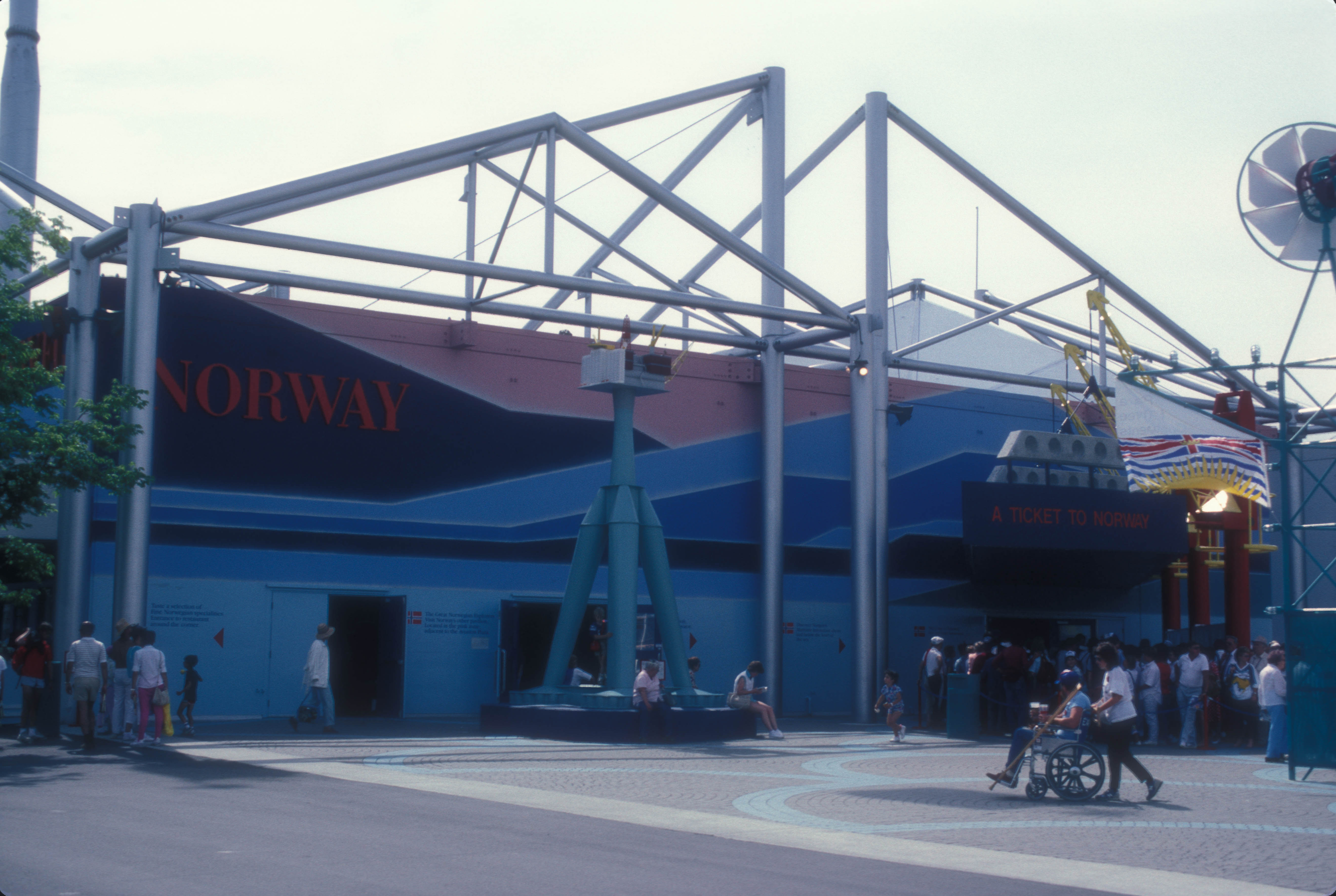
Norway

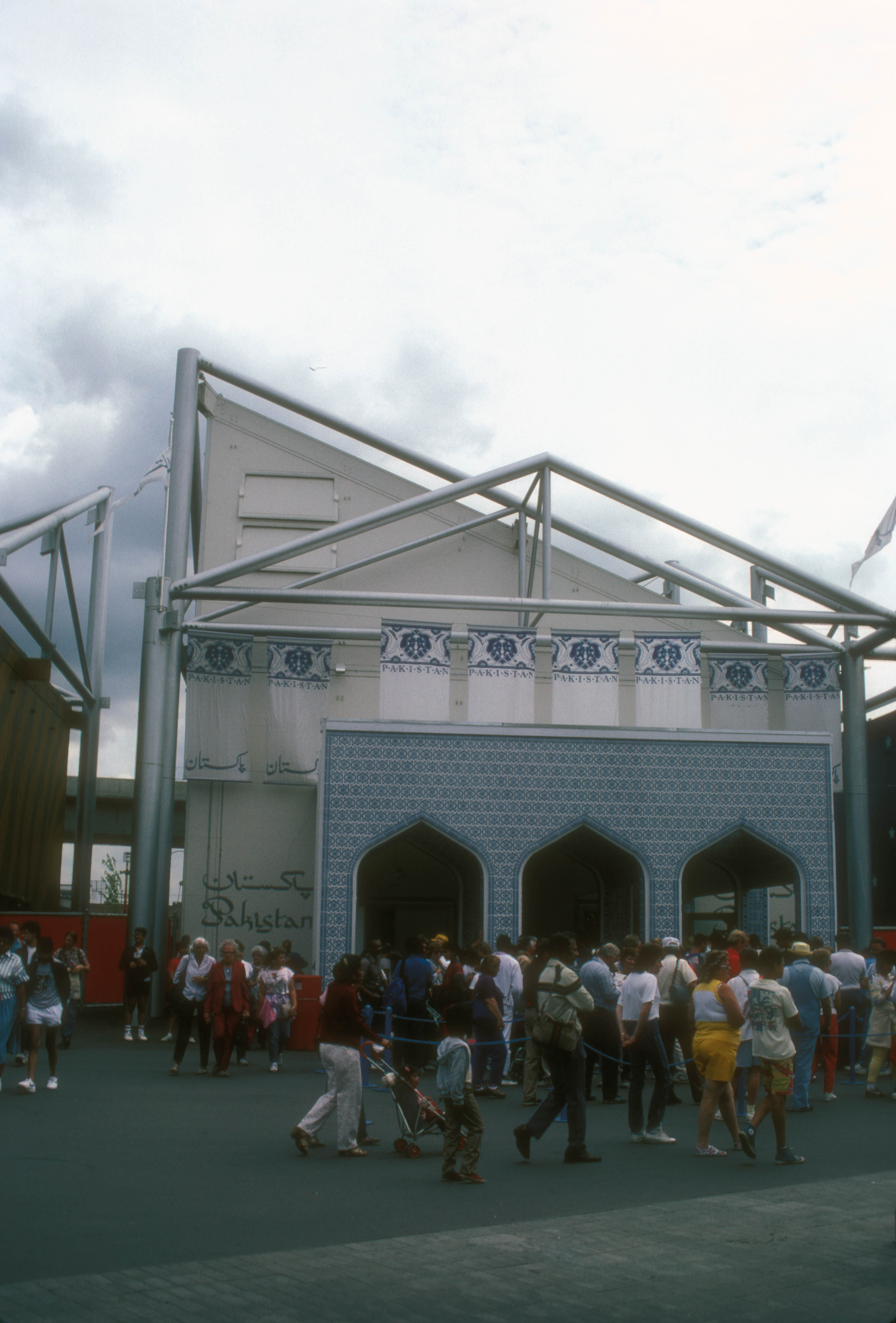
Pakistan

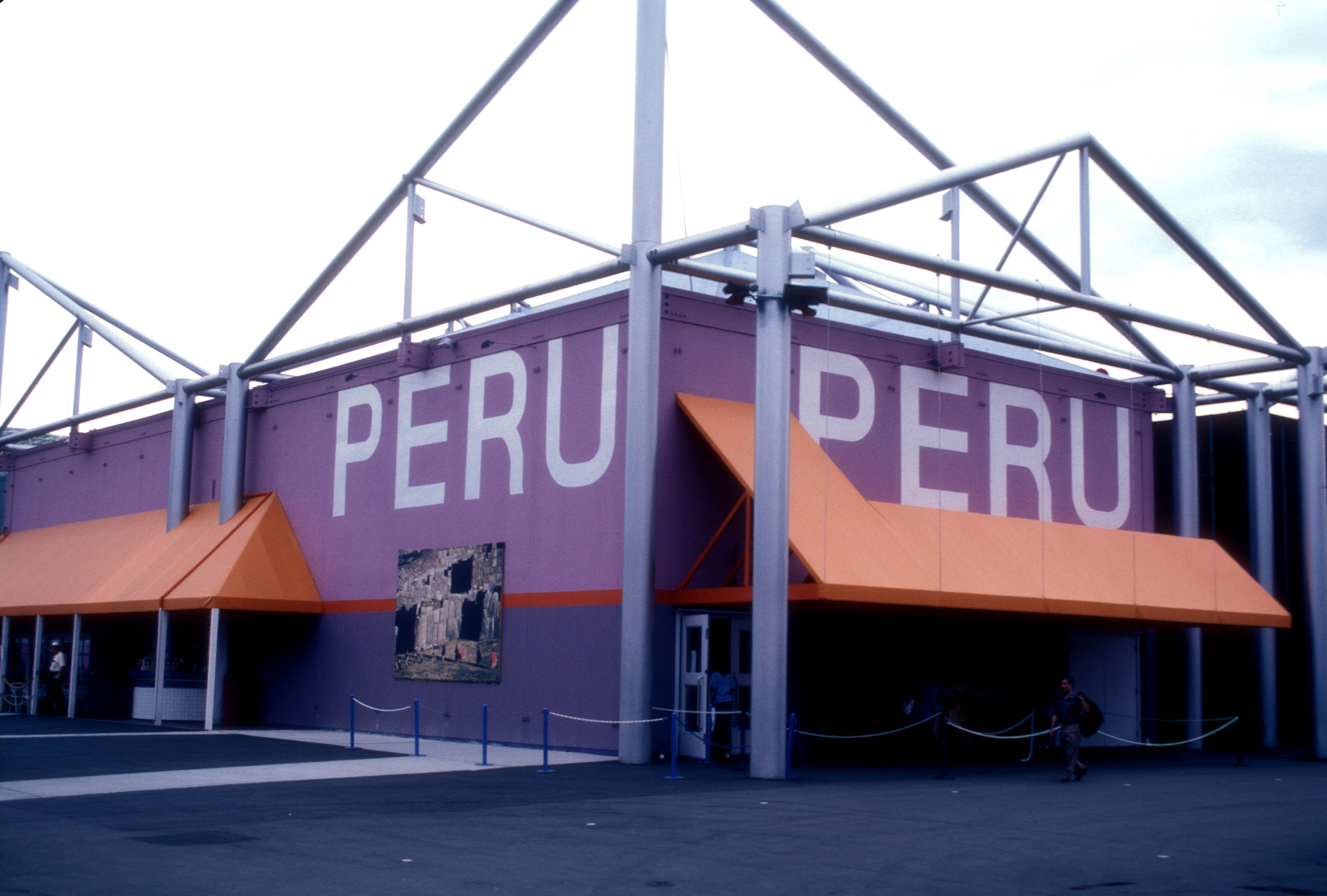
Peru

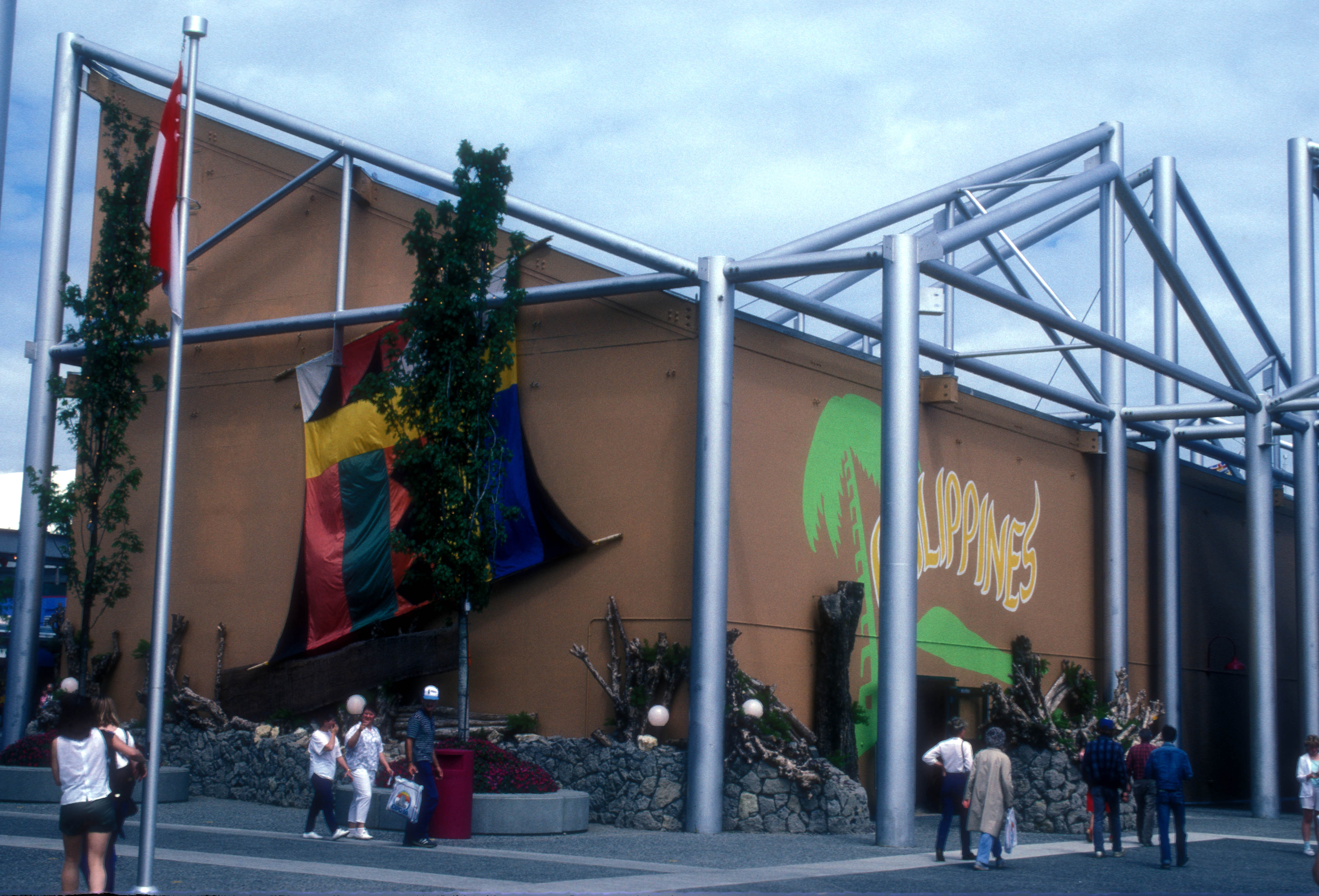
Philippines

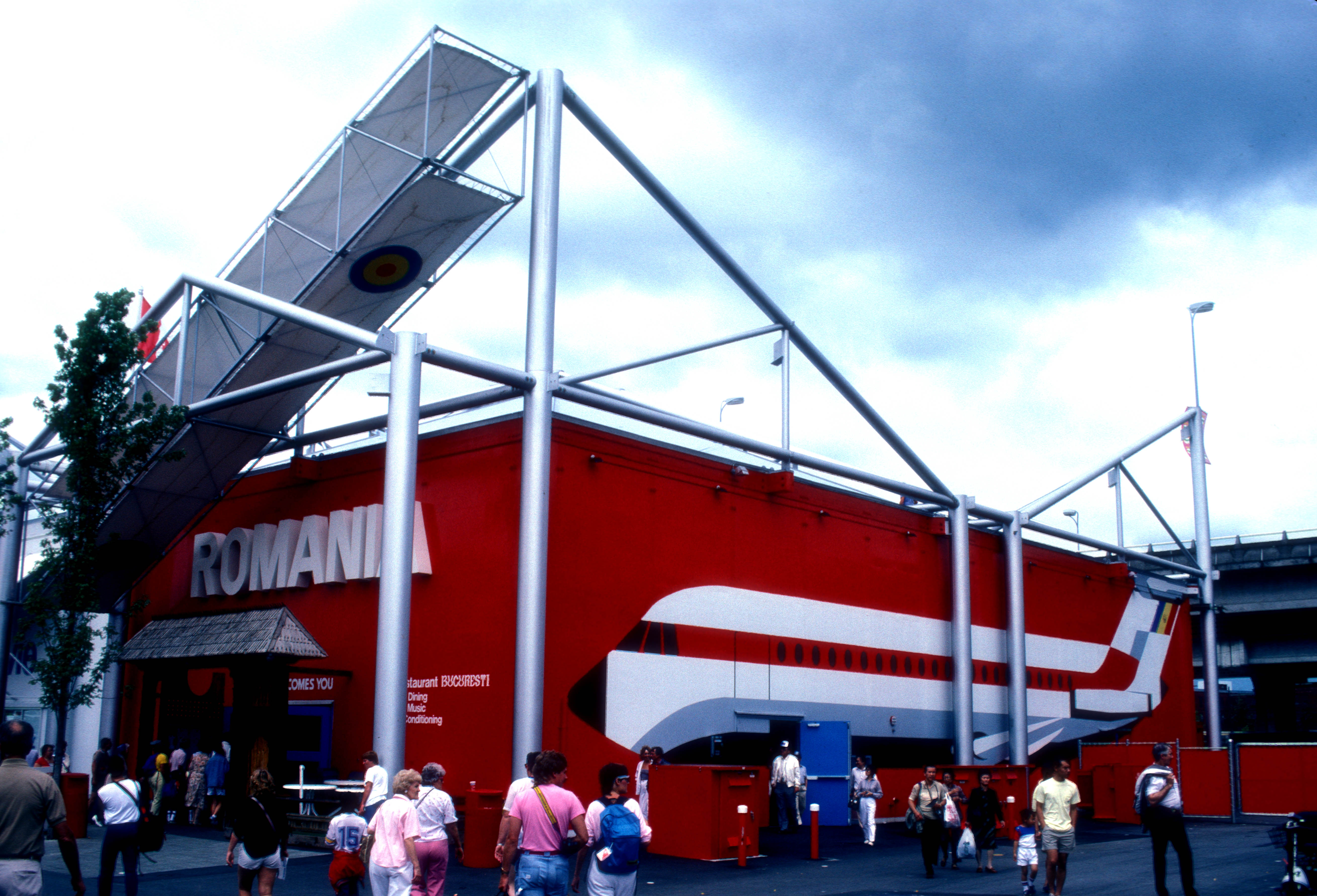
Romania

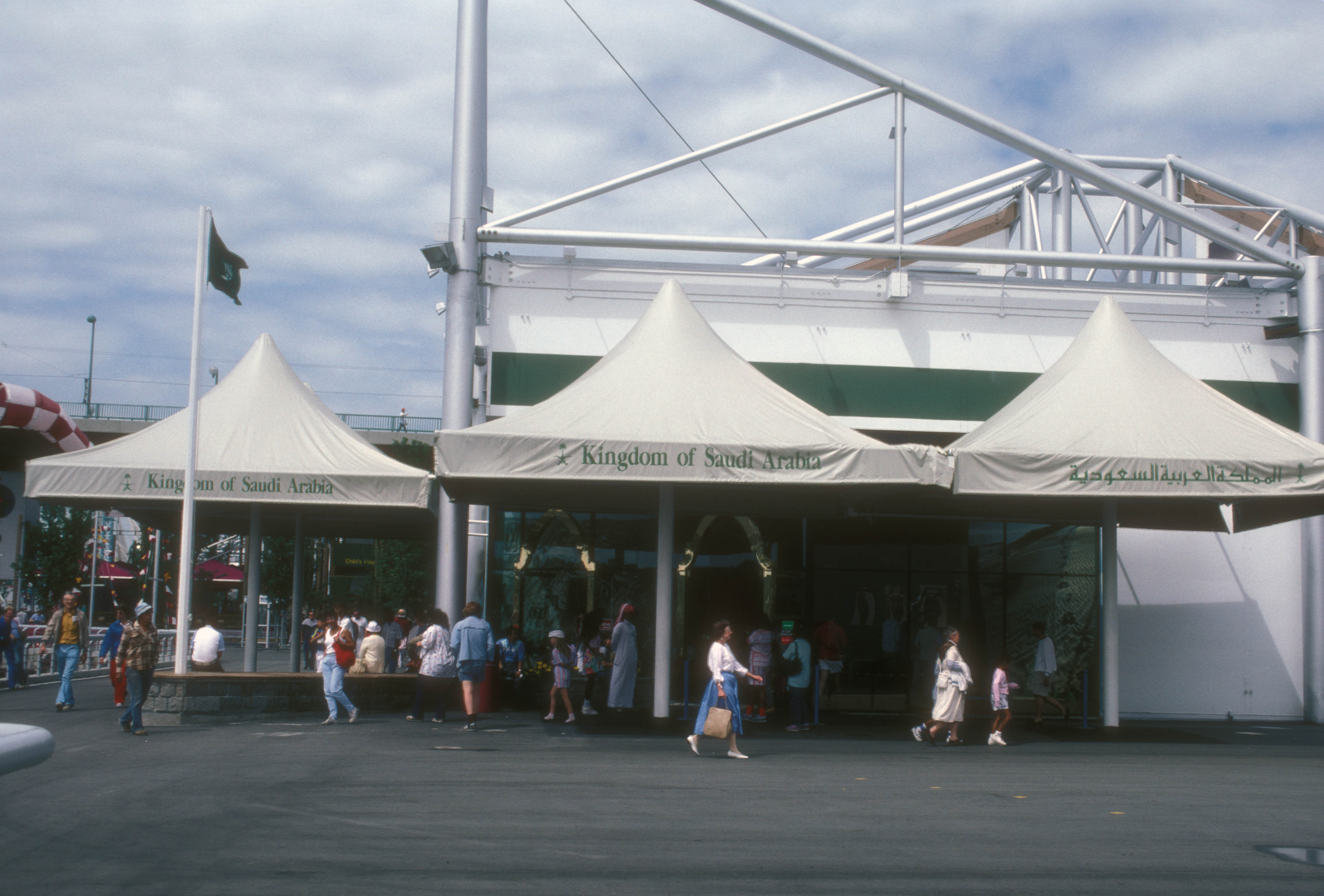
Saudi Arabia

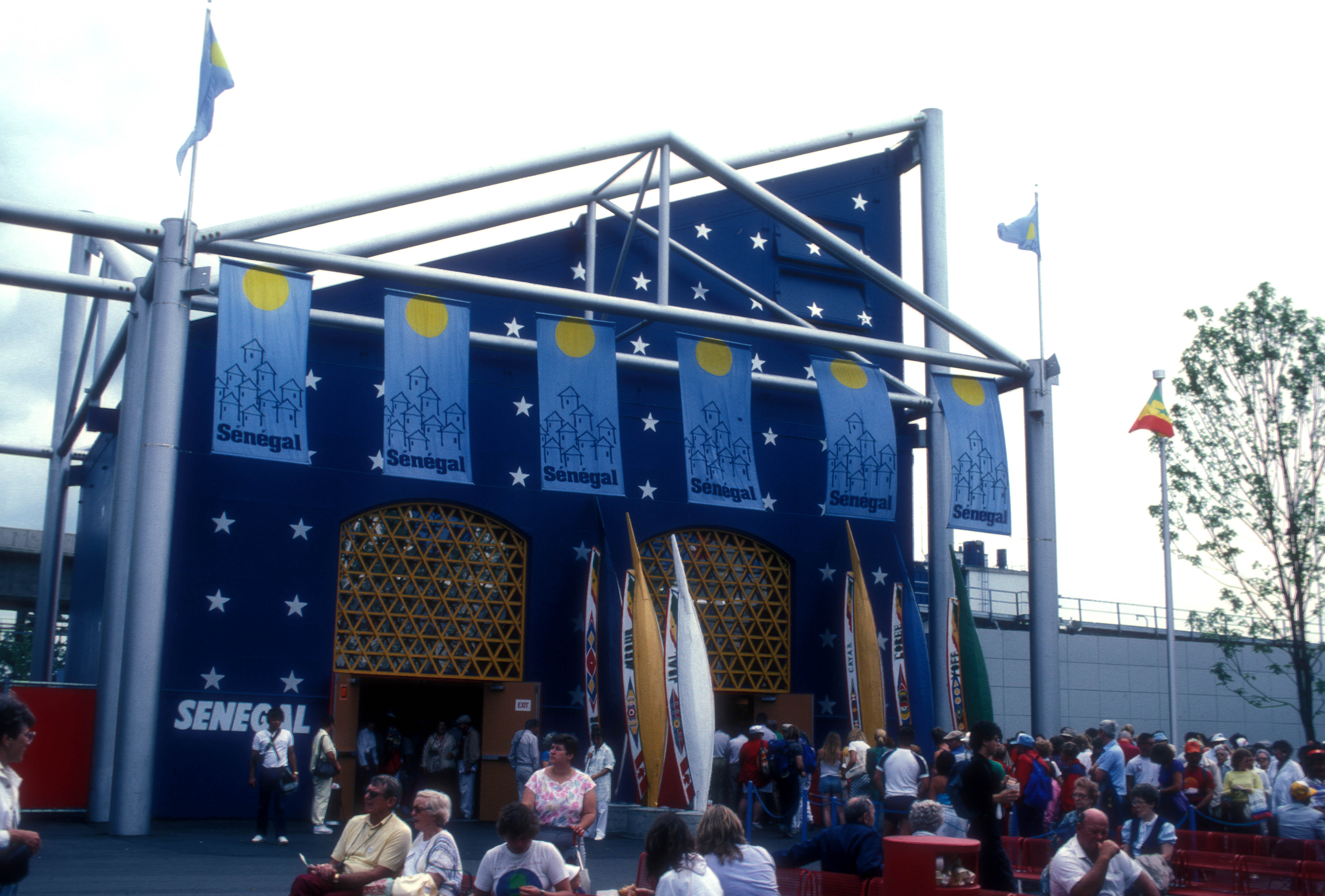
Senegal

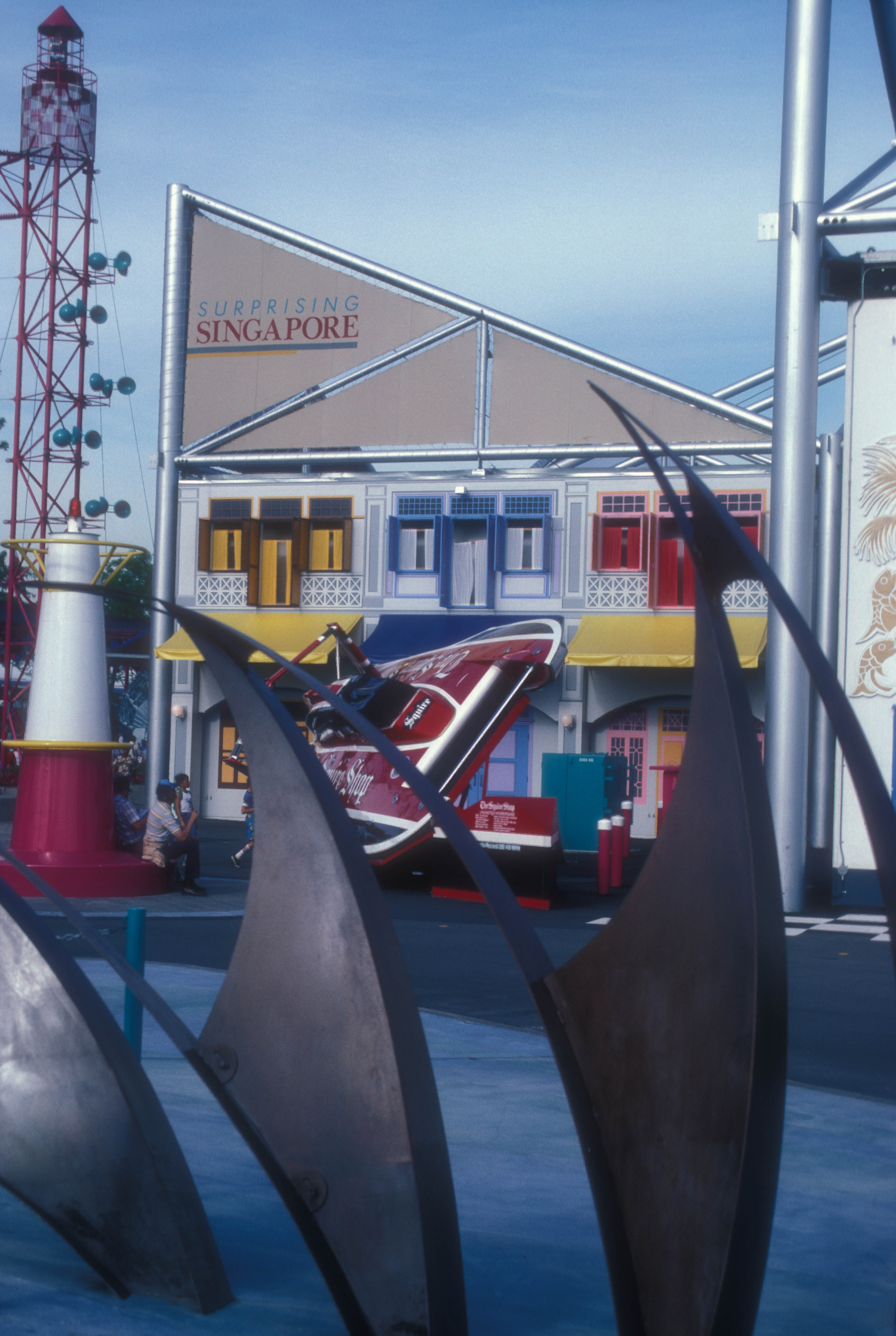
Singapore

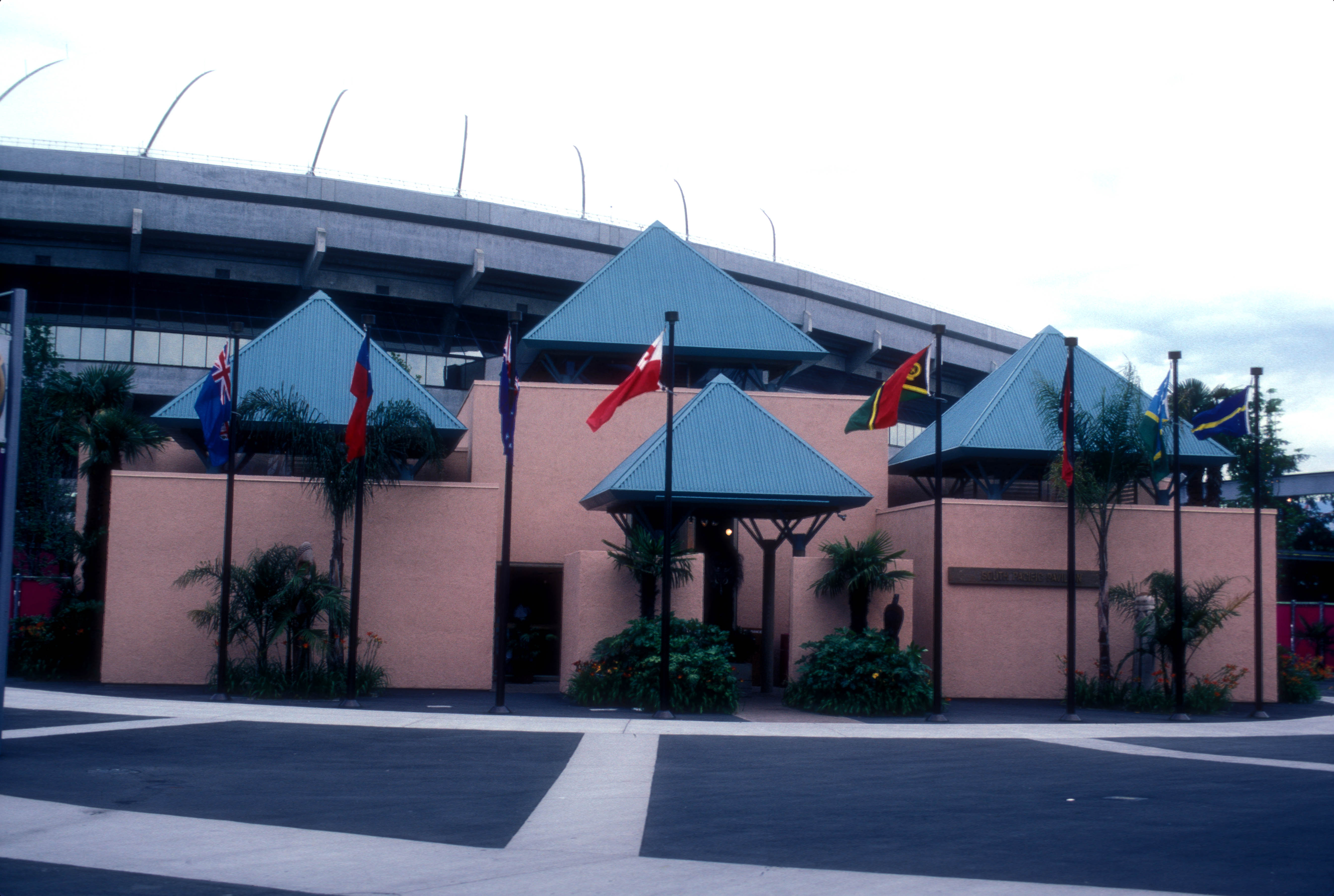
South Pacific

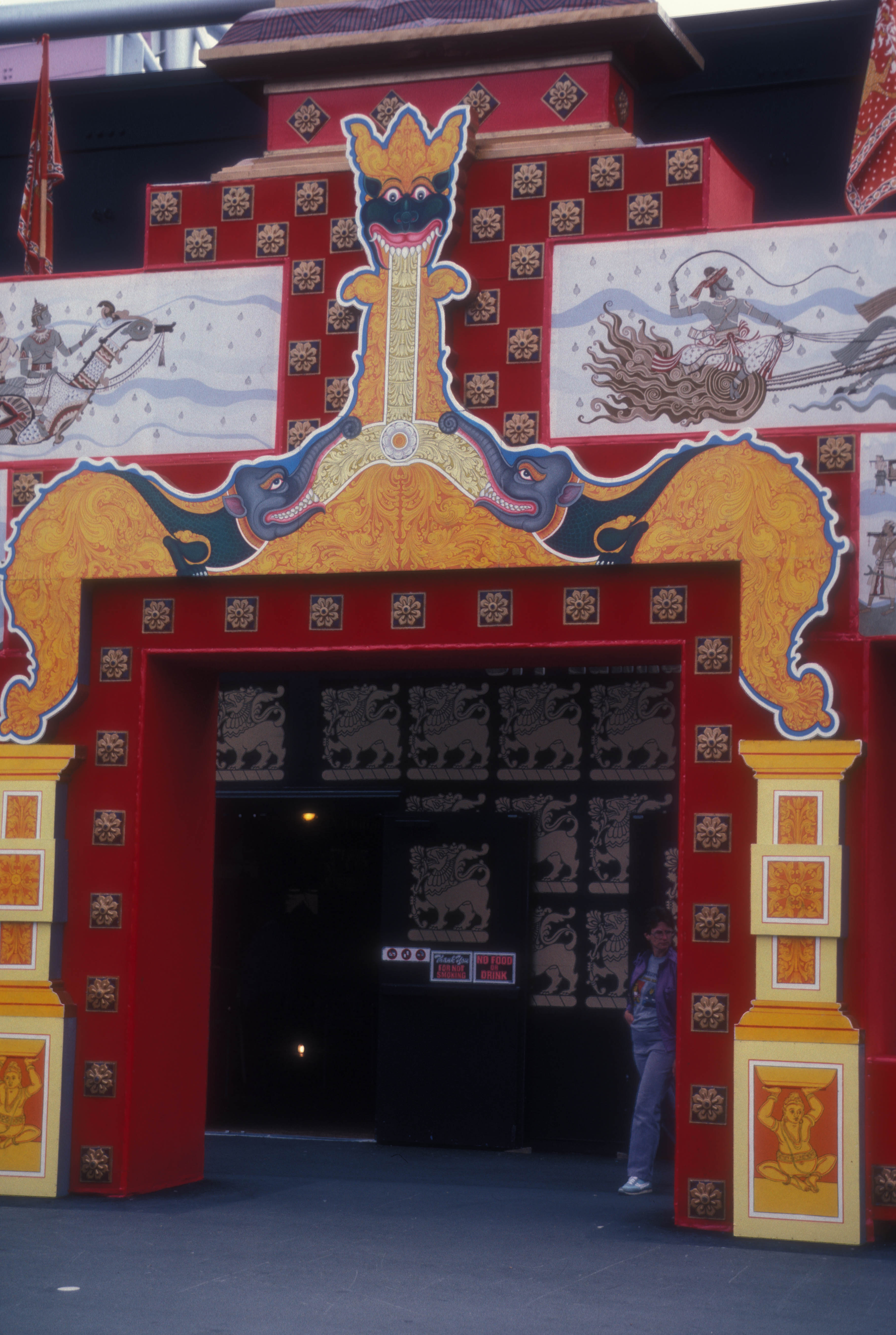
Sri Lanka

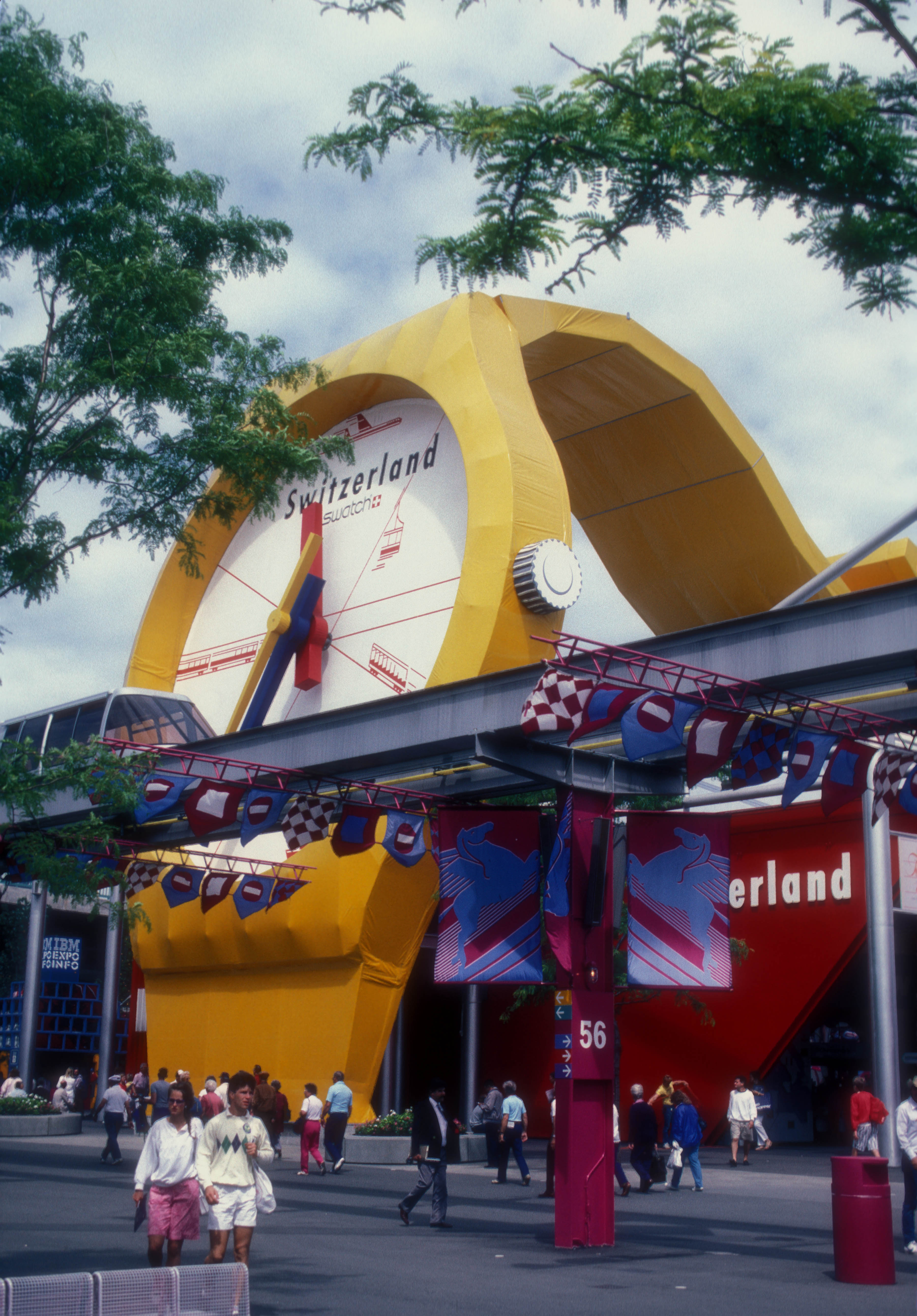
Switzerland

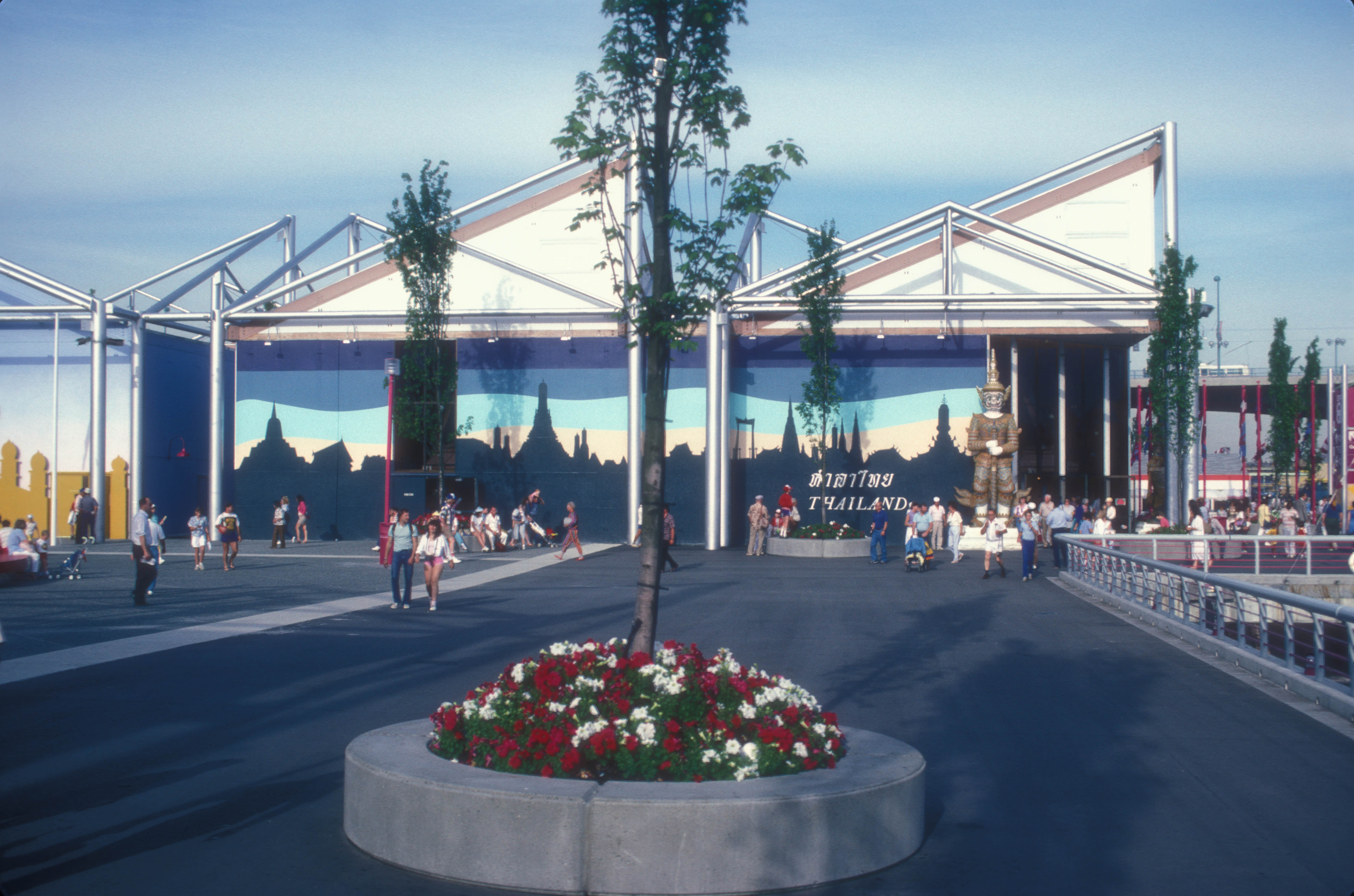
Thailand

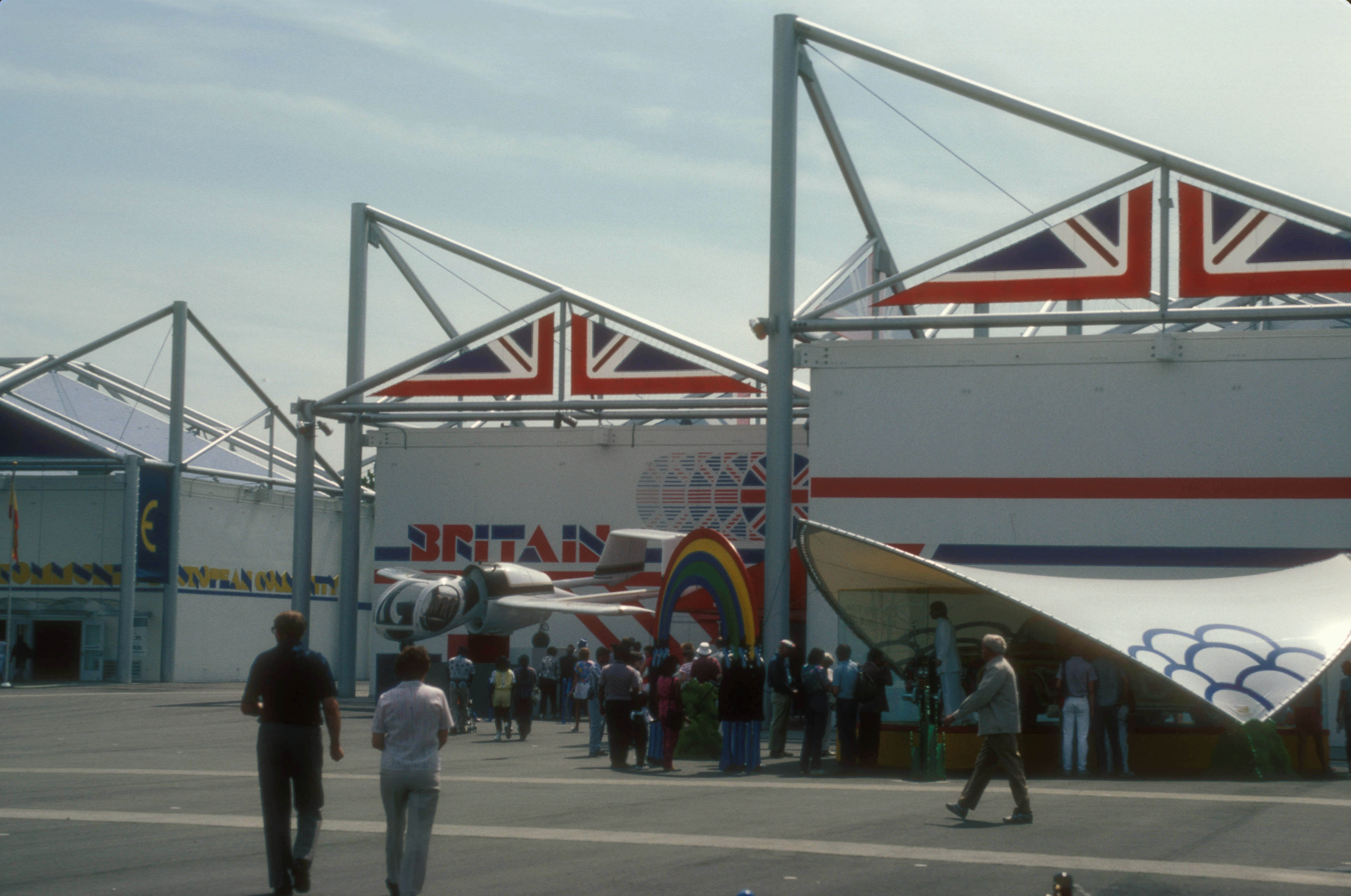
United Kingdom

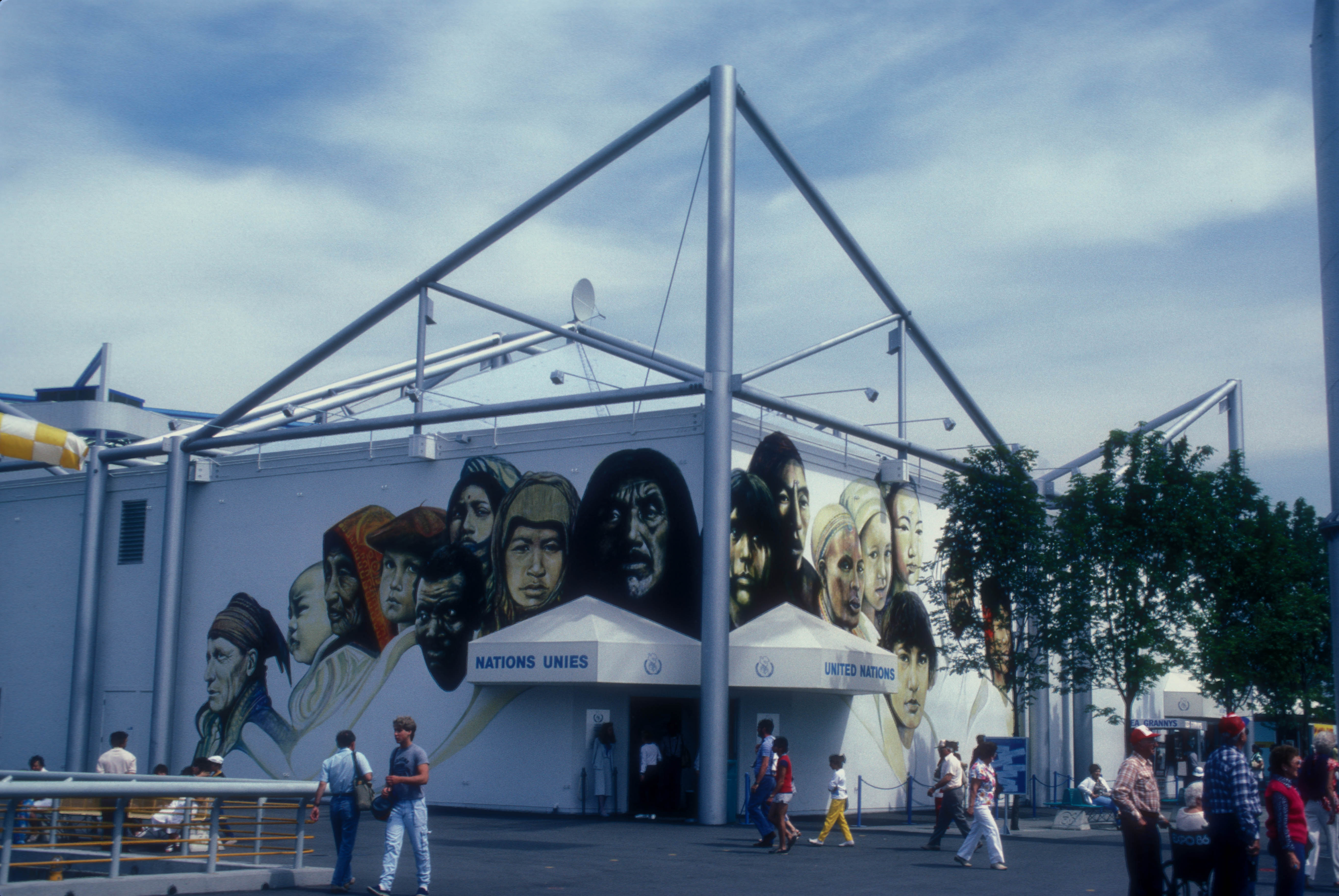
United Nations

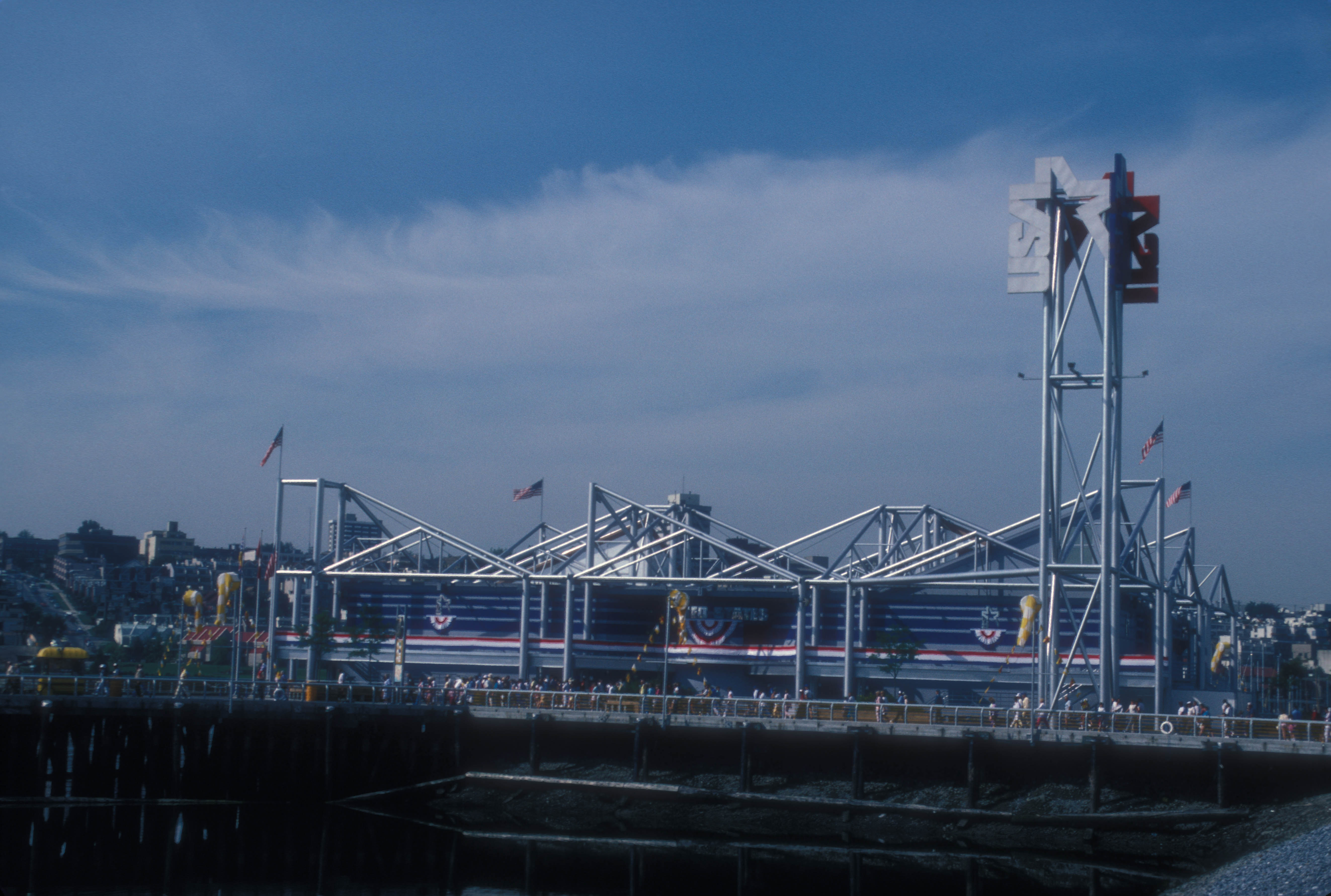
United States

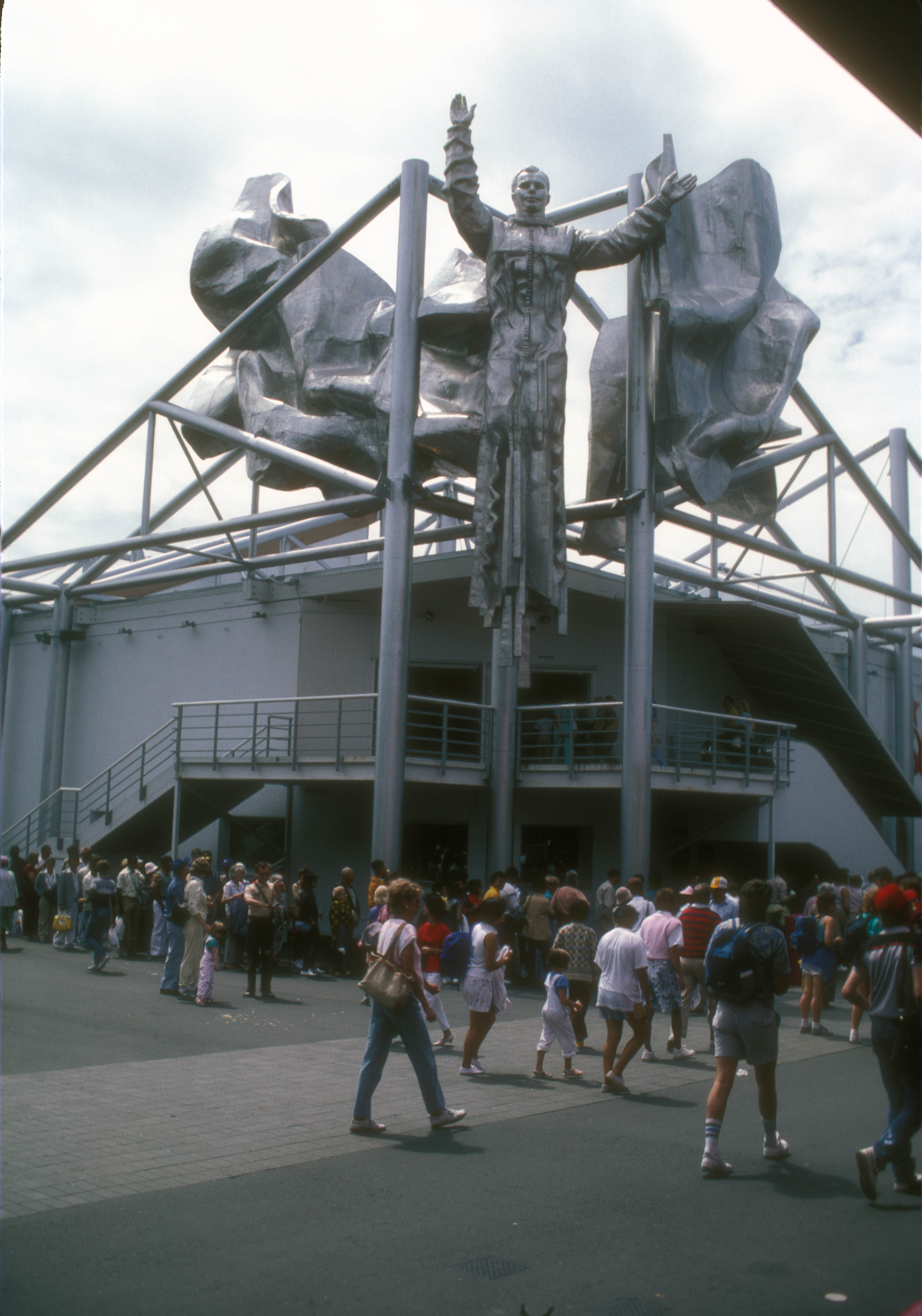
U.S.S.R.

Not pictured: •Barbados •Côte d'Ivoire •Hungary •Kenya •South Korea •Malaysia •Spain •Yugoslavia

=== US states ===
- California
- Oregon
- Washington

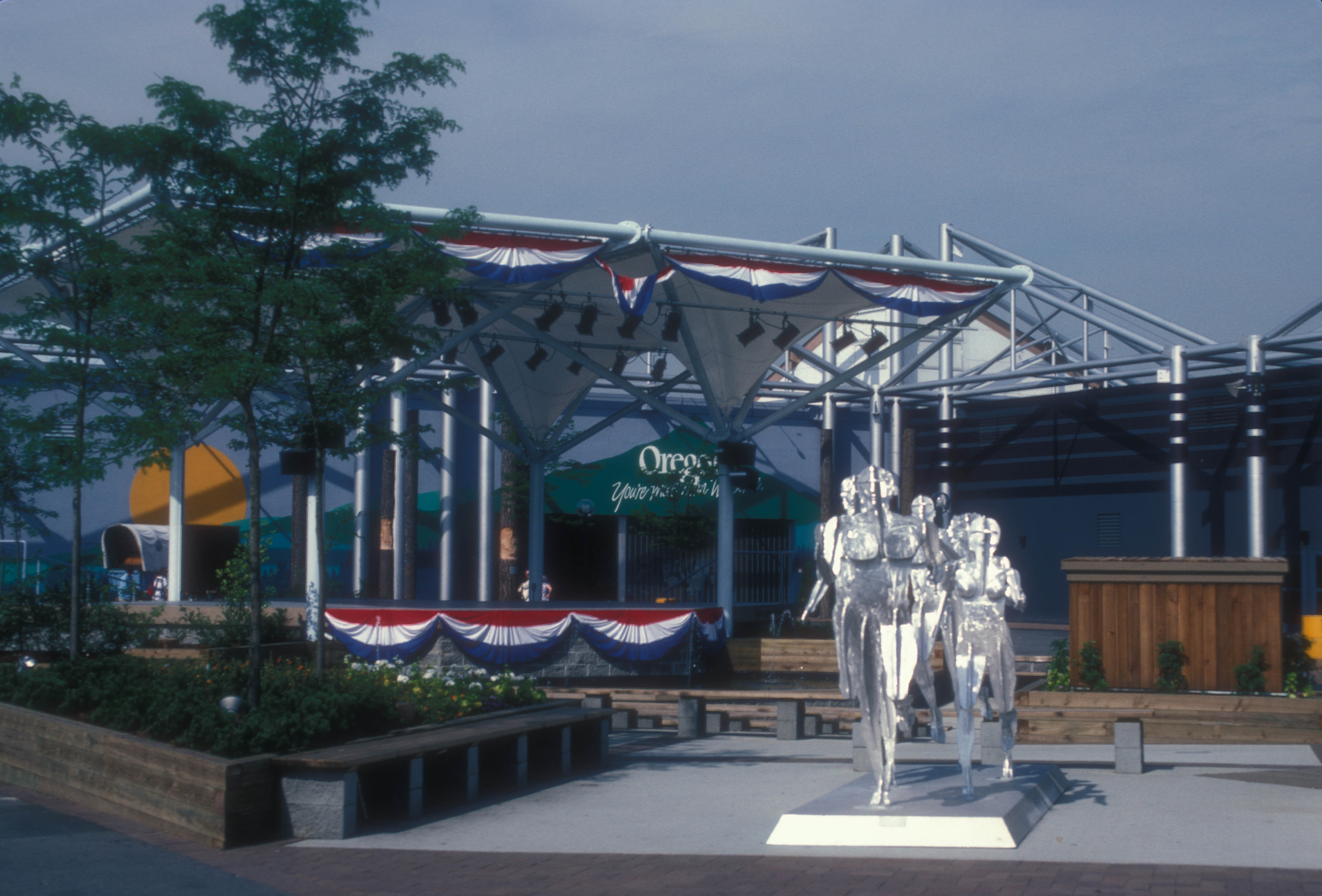
Oregon's pavilion

=== Corporations and non-governmental organizations ===
- Air Canada
- BCTV set up a fully functional broadcast studio on the Expo site. The BCTV pavilion allowed visitors to see, and participate, in every step of how a television station operates, and to see how newscasts and television shows were produced. The pavilion was also used by the station for coverage of the Expo, and by visiting journalists.
- Canadian National
- General Motors - Had one of the more popular exhibits in its pavilion: Spirit Lodge a live show augmented with holographic effects and other special effects. It was produced by experience designer Bob Rogers and the design team BRC Imagination Arts, and created with the assistance of the Kwagulth Native reserve in Alert Bay (British Columbia).
- Via Rail Exhibit
- Canadian Pacific – The pavilion's main feature was the film Rainbow War. As with the Spirit Lodge show for the General Motors pavilion, Rainbow War was also produced by experience designer Bob Rogers (designer) and the design team BRC Imagination Arts. Following the film's run at Expo '86, Rainbow War received an Oscar nomination for the 'Live Action Short' category at the 58th Academy Awards. The film was played again for an international audience at the 1988 Summer Olympics in Seoul Korea, as a part of the Olympic Arts Festival. CP Air was the official air carrier.
- Telecom Canada – Featured a Circle-Vision 360° movie: "Portraits of Canada – Images du Canada"

=== Other pavilions and exhibits ===
- Great Hall of Ramses II (Egypt) – containing rare treasures from the life of the pharaoh, Ramesses II.
- Great Norwegian Explorers (Norway)
- Pavilion of Promise (Christian pavilion)
- Roundhouse – a renovated 1880s era railway roundhouse and turntable. Restored historic train Engine 374 was displayed here.
- Expo Centre (later Science World)
- Parade of Steam – a runby of various Steam Locomotives from Canada, the US, and UK. This was part of a 2-week exhibit called "SteamExpo".
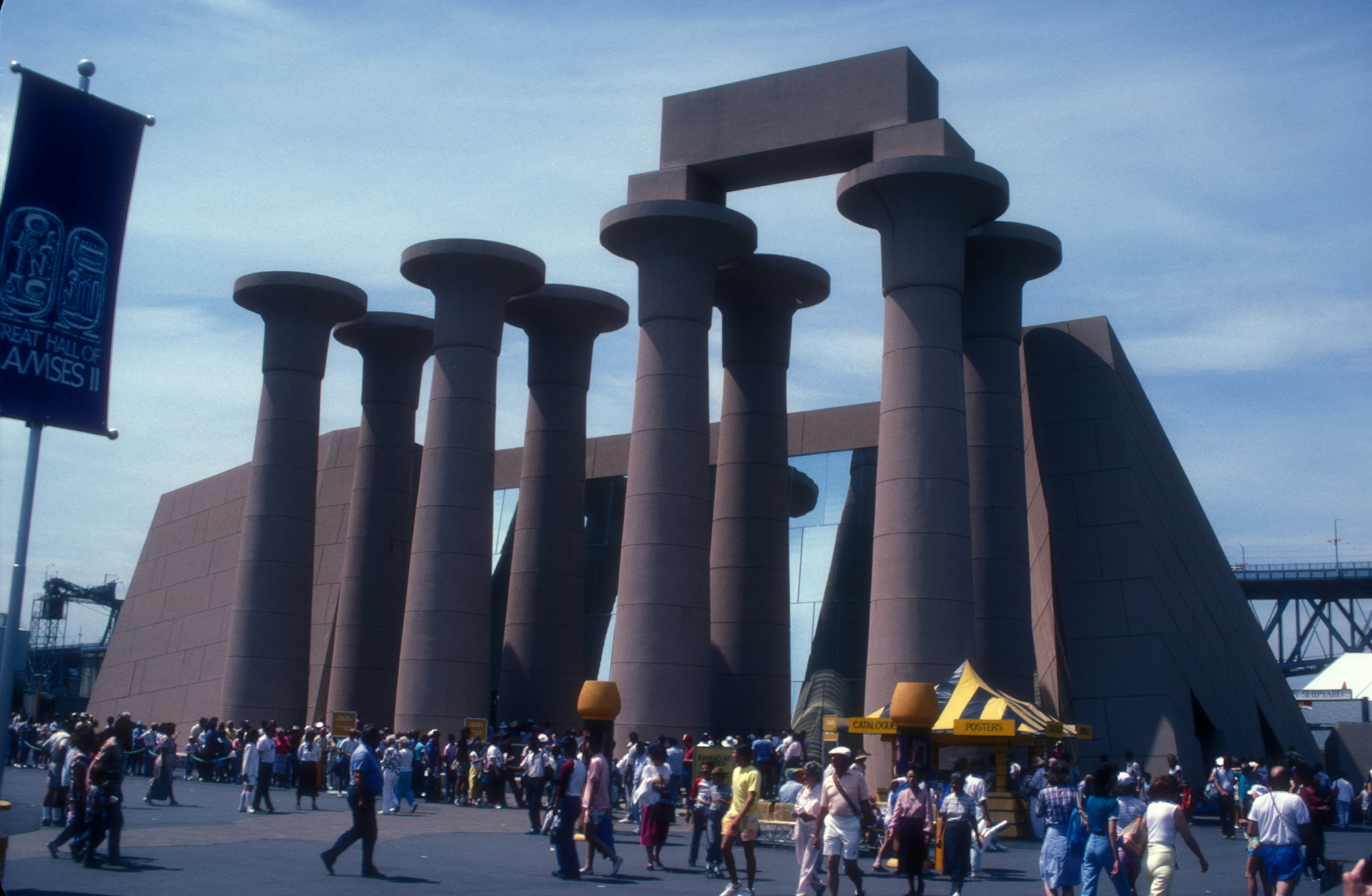
Great Hall of Ramses II

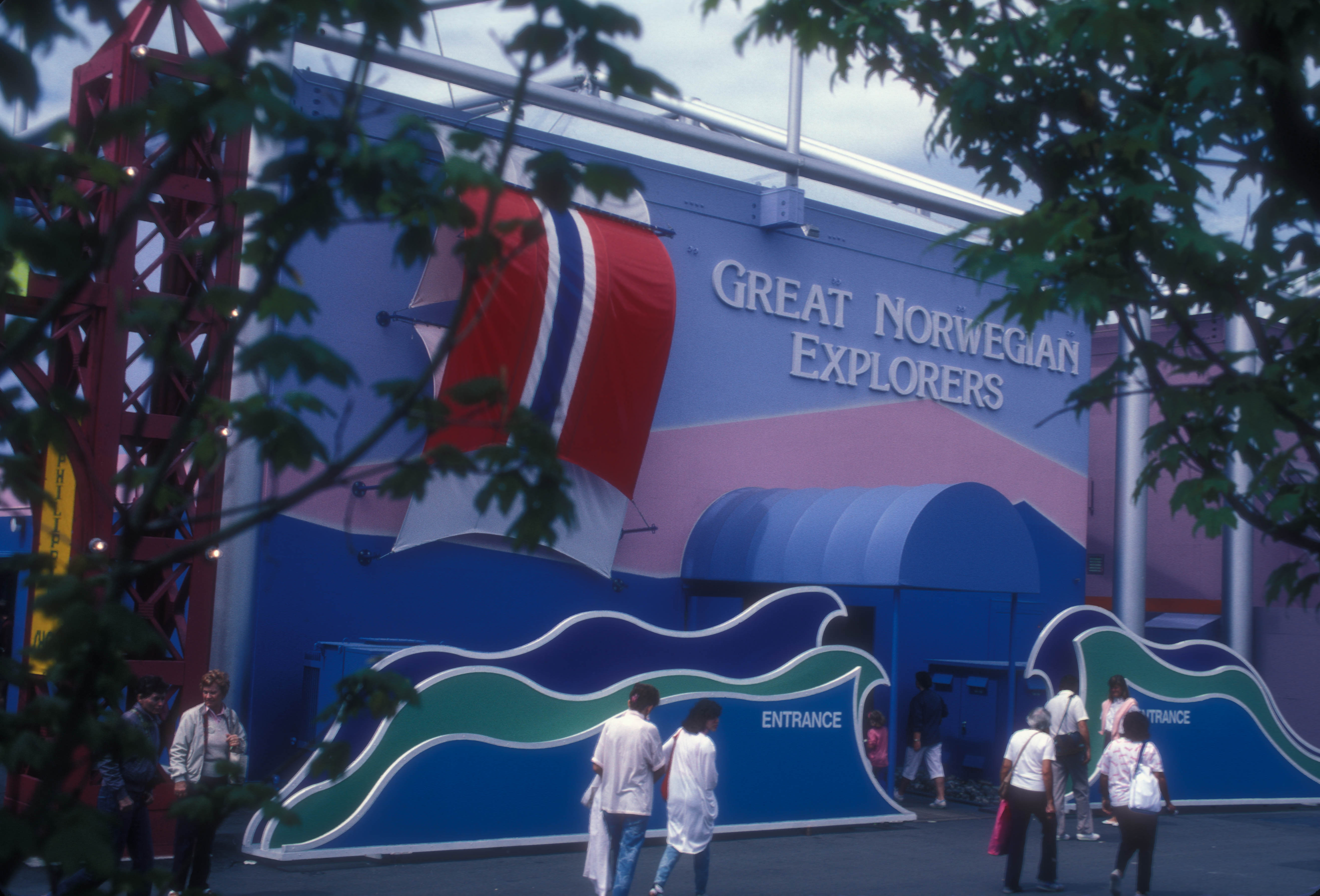
Great Norwegian Explorers

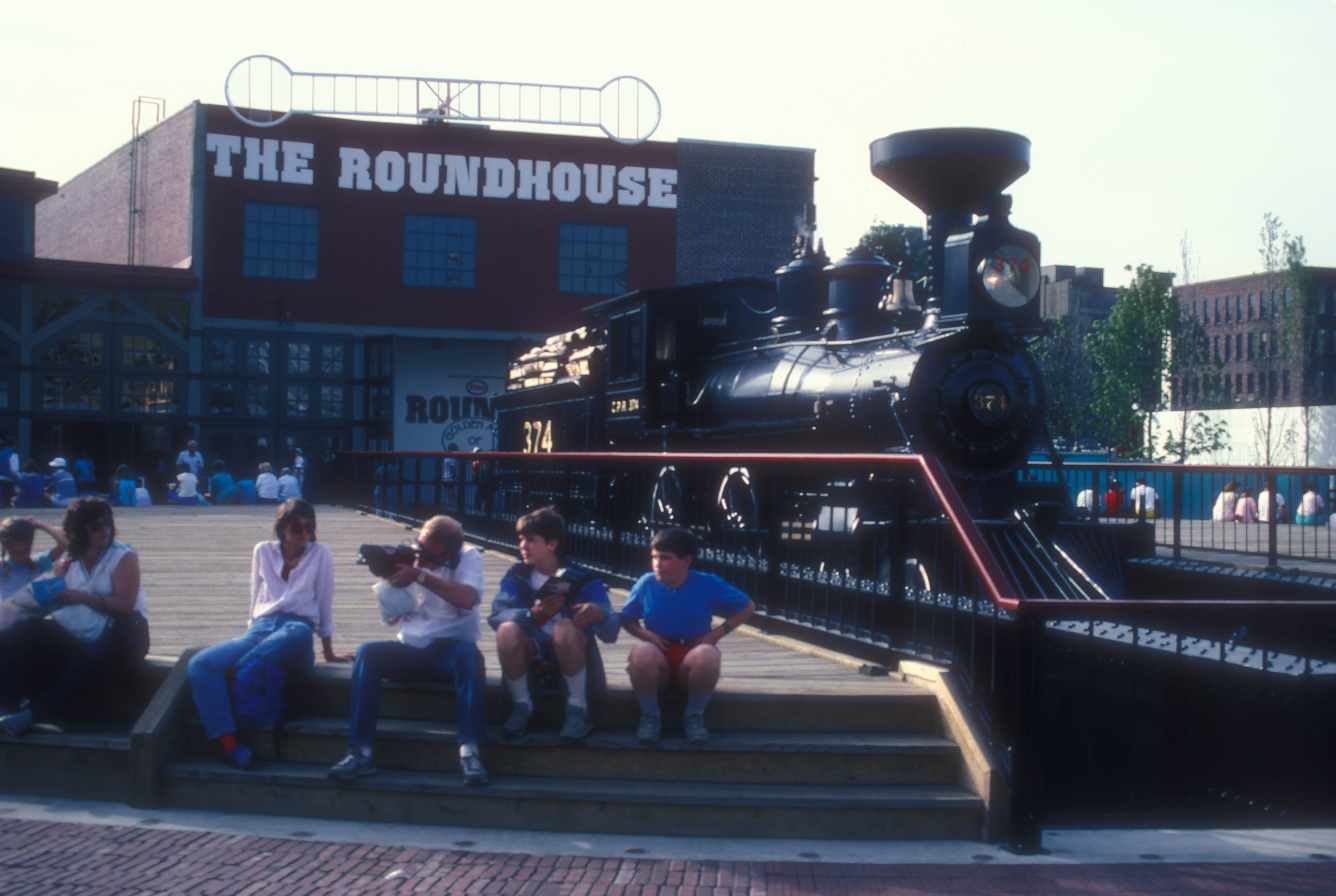
The Roundhouse

=== Outdoor exhibits ===
- Air Plaza
- Land Plaza
- Marine Plaza
- Folklife
- Highway 86 – a sculpture/exhibit consisting of a 217 m (712 ft) 4 lane concrete highway that contained various modes of transportation (cars, mopeds, bikes, etc.) that were frozen in time. All the real vehicles were painted a shade of light grey, and mounted in place. It was designed by 'S.I.T.E. Projects' of New York.
- UFO H_{2}O – a UFO inspired children's water playground.
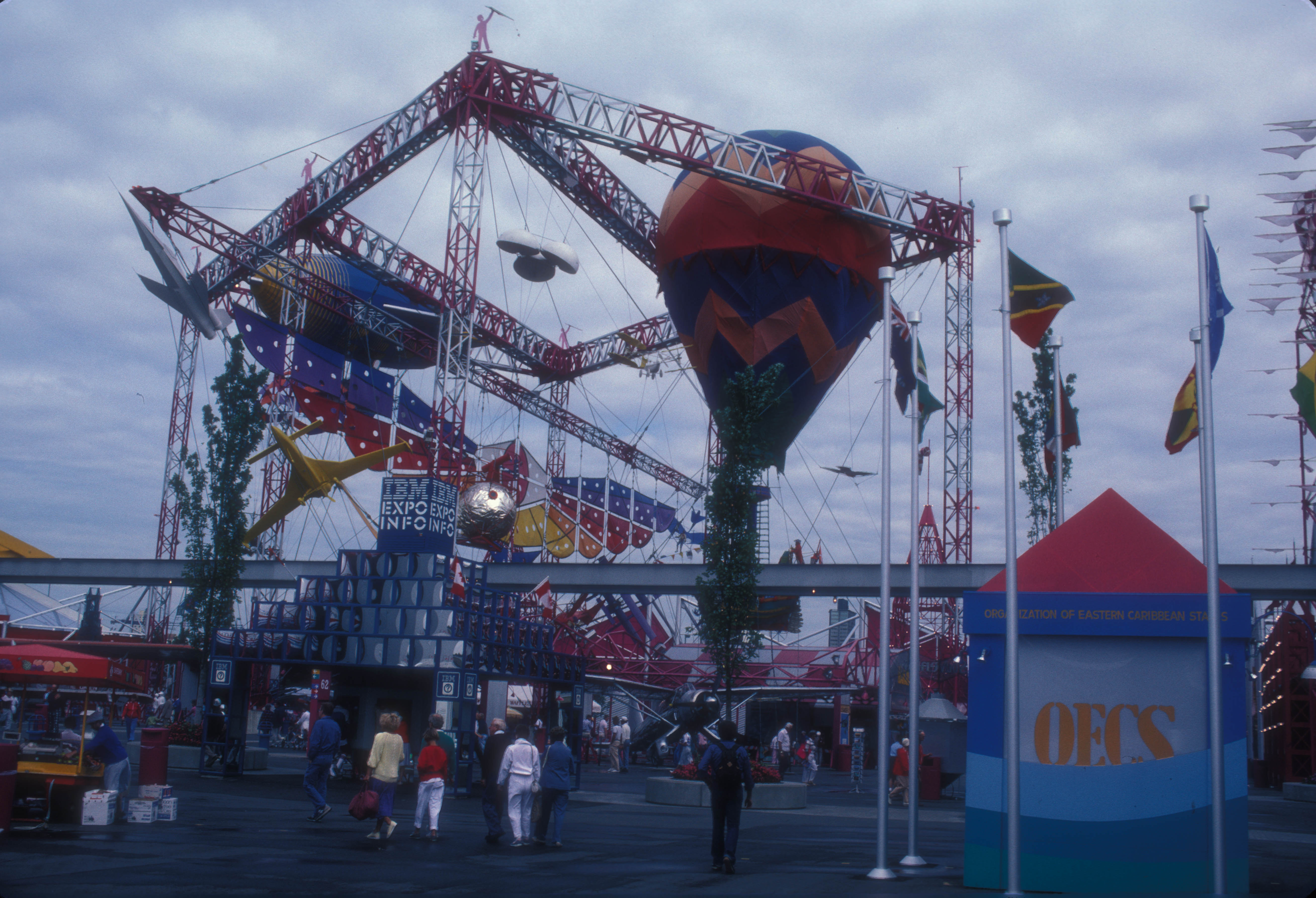
Air Plaza

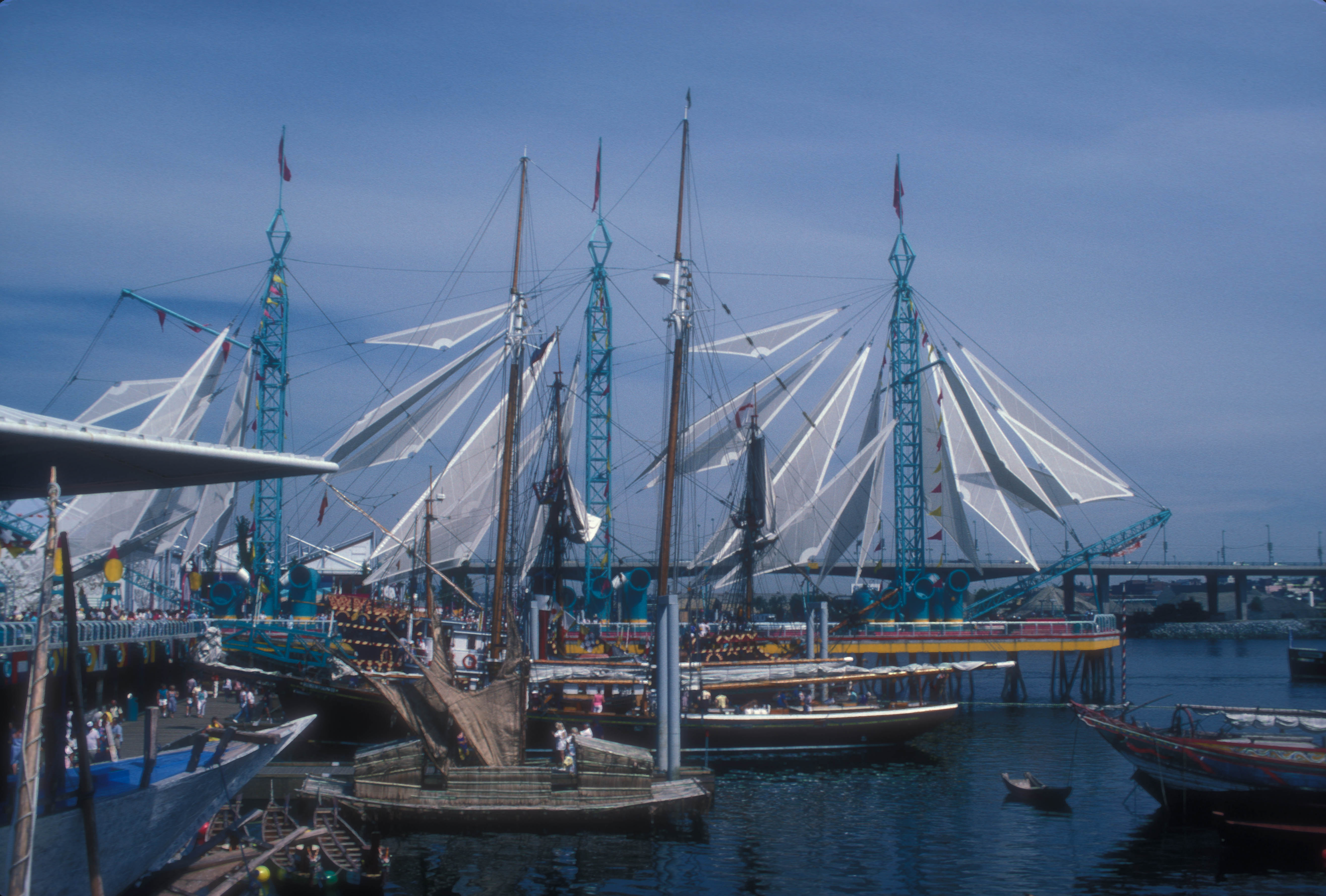
Marine Plaza

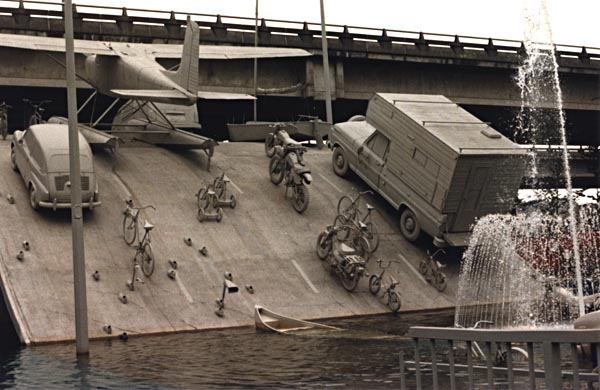
Highway 86: The Middle of the Road

=== Theatres ===
- Labatt's Expo Theatre
- Kodak Pacific Bowl
- Xerox International Theatre

== Entertainment and notable visitors ==
=== Royalty ===
- Prince Charles and Diana, Princess of Wales for the opening ceremonies; Crown Prince Harald and Crown Princess Sonja of Norway; Saudi Arabian Prince Sultan bin Salman Al Saud.

=== Prime ministers ===
- Brian Mulroney (Canada); Margaret Thatcher (United Kingdom); Pierre Trudeau (former prime minister of Canada).

=== Vice president ===
- George Bush (United States).

=== Concerts ===
- Einstürzende Neubauten
- Harry Belafonte
- Anne Murray
- Billy Ocean
- Bruce Cockburn
- Miles Davis
- Wynton Marsalis
- Annie Lennox – Eurythmics
- Julio Iglesias
- Amy Grant
- Loverboy
- A-ha
- Liberace
- Mormon Tabernacle Choir
- Bryan Adams
- Gowan
- Parachute Club, Joan Baez with Don McLean
- Kenny Loggins
- B.B. King
- Stevie Ray Vaughan
- Lou Rawls & The 5th Dimension
- Idle Eyes
- Honeymoon Suite
- Kim Mitchell
- Johnny Cash
- Depeche Mode
- Joe Jackson
- George Thorogood + the Delaware Destroyers
- Van Morrison
- Smokey Robinson
- George Benson
- John Denver
- The Beach Boys
- Air Supply
- Peter, Paul & Mary
- The Manhattan Transfer
- The Temptations
- Tangerine Dream
- René Simard
- k.d. lang (opening for Rockin' Ronnie Hawkins)
- Peter Allen
- Sheena Easton
- Trooper
- Kid Creole & The Coconuts
- Test Dept
- The Romaniacs
- Tangerine Dream
- Youssou N'Dour
- Rolf Harris
- Kool & The Gang
- Roy Orbison
- Fats Domino with Jerry Lee Lewis
- Donovan World Drums concert (led by John Wyre)
- Shannon Gunn
- Skywalk
- Kent-Meridian Jazz Ensemble
- Images in Vogue
- Peter Noone
- Alvin Lee opened for Steppenwolf.
- David and the Goliaths
- Dollie Deluxe
- Arrow (musician)
- Teesside Apollo Male Voice Choir (United Kingdom)

Many of the concerts were hosted by Red Robinson, Vancouver DJ. These concerts were held at the Open air Expo Theatre.

The "Festival of Independent Recording Artists", a concert series promoting local bands, was cancelled on the first night after a performance by Slow devolved into a riot. Other artists who had been scheduled to appear in that series included Art Bergmann.

=== Comedians ===
- Bill Cosby, Bob Newhart, Bob Hope, Red Skelton, Joan Rivers, Howie Mandel, George Burns, Victor Borge and Danny Kaye.

=== Dance ===
- Mikhail Baryshnikov, The Royal Ballet, Cheremosh Ukrainian Dance Company, Ukrainian Shumka Dancers, Bongsan Talchum, Bella Domingo Polynesian Dancers.

=== Directors ===
- Norman Jewison, George Cosmatos (Rambo: First Blood Part II).

=== Oceanographer ===
- Jacques Cousteau

=== School bands ===
- Pacific Blue Drum & Bugle Corps, Surrey, British Columbia
- Leilehua High School, Wahiawa, Hawaii
- Layton High School Lancer Marching Band
- Alta Loma High School (Chamber Singers), Rancho Cucamonga, CA
- College Park High School Marching Band from Pleasant Hill, CA
- Reynolds High School Concert Band from Portland, OR
- Verona High School Jazz Band from Verona, NJ
- Modesto High School Marching, Modesto CA
- Sapulpa High School Choir (Blue Blazed Marvels), Sapulpa OK
- Concert and Jazz Band from Gustine, CA
- Siuslaw High School Band and Jazz Band, from Florence, Oregon
- Willamette High School Band from Eugene, Oregon at Oregon Pavilion
- South Collegiate Institute Senior Band from London, Ontario
- Central Linn High School Concert Band from Halsey, Oregon
- The Cardinal Regiment (then known by a different name) from Santa Cruz High School, Santa Cruz, CA.
- Granite Senior Youth Symphony Orchestra from Salt Lake City, Utah
- Yamhill County High School Collaboration Band from Yamhill County Oregon
- E.L. Crossley Secondary School Marching Band, Pelham, Ontario
- Nimitz High School String Orchestra from Irving, TX
- Vallejo High School Marching Band from Vallejo, California

== Facts and figures ==
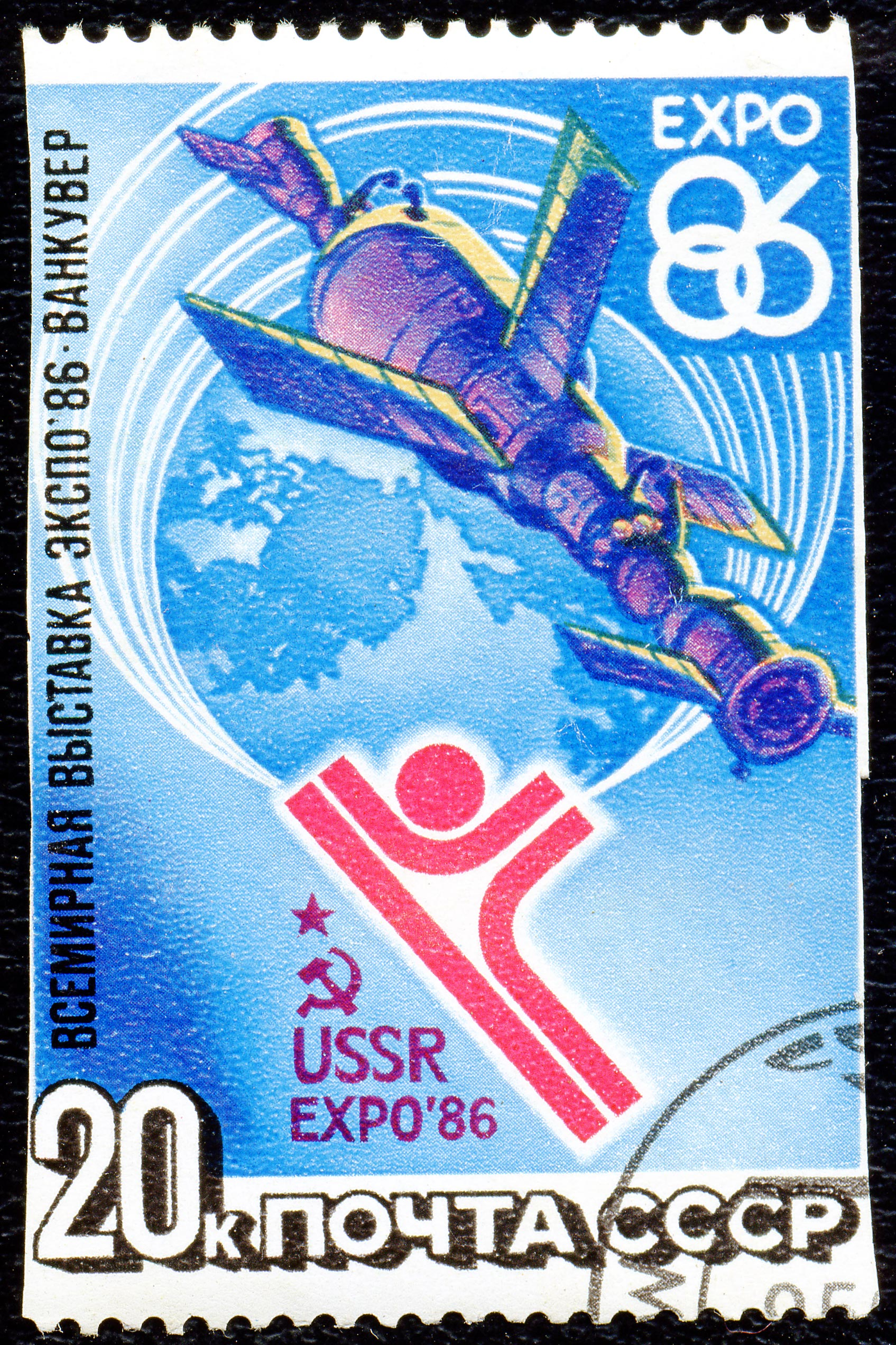
Expo 86 Stamp Issued by the Soviet Union

- Official Theme: "Transportation and Communication"
- Sub Theme: "A Celebration of Ingenuity"
- Total Attendance Number: 22,111,578
- Operating Dates: May 2, 1986, to October 13, 1986
- Chief Architect: Bruno Freschi
- Official Mascot: Expo Ernie – A life-sized robot
- Revenues: $491m
- Expenditures : $802m
- Deficit : $311m
- Economic contribution :$3,700m

(Note: All amounts in Canadian funds, not adjusted for inflation.)

- Main Expo Site Size: 670,000 m^{3}, (165 acres)
- Canadian Pavilion Size: 24,000 m^{3} (6 acres), 4.5 km (2¾ miles) away from the main site connected by Vancouver's SkyTrain
- Total Expo Site Size: 700,000 m^{2} (173 acres)

54 official participating nations:

Antigua and Barbuda, Australia, Barbados, Belgium, Brunei, Canada, China, Cook Islands, Côte d'Ivoire, Costa Rica, Cuba, Czechoslovakia, Dominica, Fiji, France, Germany, Grenada, Hungary, Indonesia, Italy, Japan, Kenya, Malaysia, Mexico, Montserrat, Nauru, Norway, Pakistan, Papua New Guinea, Peru, Philippines, Romania, Saint Kitts and Nevis, Saint Lucia, Saint Vincent and the Grenadines, Saudi Arabia, Senegal, Singapore, Solomon Islands, South Korea, Spain, Sri Lanka, Switzerland, Thailand, Tonga, United Kingdom, United States, U.S.S.R. Vanuatu, Western Samoa, and Yugoslavia.

== Legacy ==
In all, 22 million people attended the expo and, despite a deficit of $311 million CAD, it was considered a tremendous success. It remains to date the second biggest event in British Columbia history and is viewed by some as the transition of Vancouver from a provincial city dedicated to extractive industries to a city with global clout. It marked a strong boost to tourism for the province.

Many have also seen the fair as being at least partially responsible for the re-election of the Social Credit party for its final term as a provincial government.

Today, the western half of the site has and is continuing to be developed into parks and high rise condominiums. The eastern portion was used for the annual Molson Indy race, until it was cancelled in late 2004. Future plans call for the eastern third of the site to be developed into parkland and condominiums. The western third of the site is presently owned by the real estate investment firm Concord Pacific, which has its primary shareholder the Hong Kong billionaire Li Ka-Shing. The redevelopment took longer than expected, "set the standard for development in 1990s." "These new neighborhoods delivered substantial contributions to public infrastructure and overall livability ... Integrating community amenity contributions (CACs) into the development process, thus enabling the construction of important public infrastructure as the city grows, [which] has become a signature part of 'Vancouverism', an urban development process and style for which the city has become world famous." The south eastern section of the site just underneath the former Expo Centre was redeveloped for use as part the Olympic Village for the 2010 Winter Olympics. After the Olympics, it was redeveloped into condos and park land.

"Expo 86 will be remembered for the warm, friendly spirit that existed among the exhibitors, staff, 8000 volunteers and visitors." according to Kim O'Leary

=== State of Expo 86 attractions ===
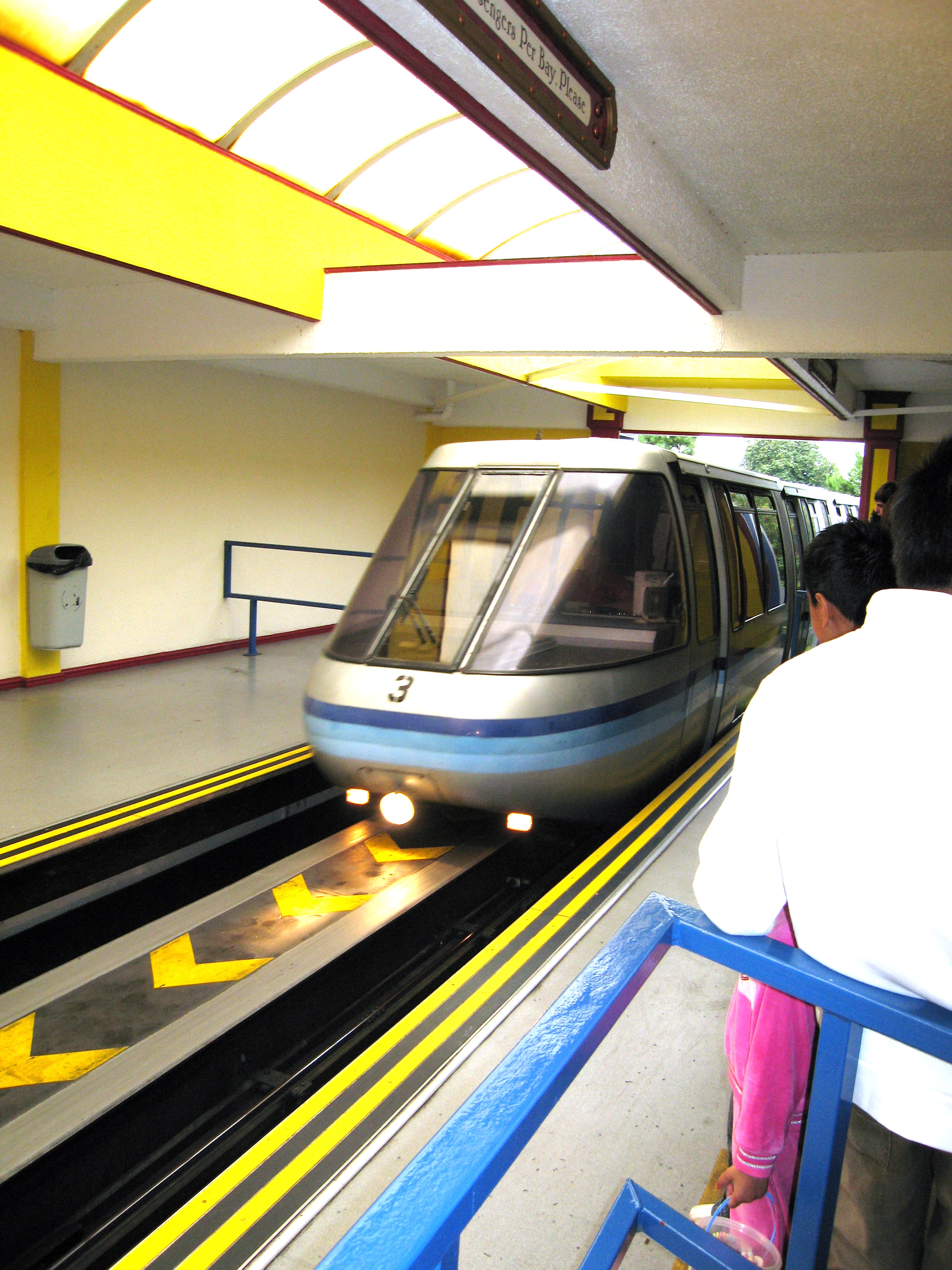
The former Expo 86 monorail, Swiss built Von Roll Seilbahnen AG Mark II, is now installed at Alton Towers in the United Kingdom.

Some of the lasting contributions of Expo 86 to the city of Vancouver include:

- SkyTrain – A fully automated elevated advanced rapid transit system. The first line was built intending partially to serve Expo, with construction beginning in the autumn of 1982 and revenue service opening in December 1985. SkyTrain has since become the backbone of the city's metropolitan transit system (metro) and the system has been extended six times, including three minor expansions to the original revenue line Expo Line in 1989, 1990, and 1994. Two additional metro lines, the Millennium Line and the Canada Line, were built in 2001 and 2009, respectively, with the Millennium Line being extended to Coquitlam by the Evergreen Extension in 2016. Construction of guideway, station, and train retrofitting of the entire Expo Line are underway as of 2012. Today, SkyTrain transports over 500,000 passengers daily. SkyTrain uses its original 1985–86 Expo fleet of trains (Bombardier/UTDC Mark I) as part of daily revenue service, and newer trains that have additional capacity and more advanced technology (Mark II, Mark III).
- Expo Centre – Science World – An interactive educational centre with an OMNIMAX cinema. It opened May 2, 1986, as the Expo Centre. Between 1989 and 1990, after much public support, the building was expanded, and in late 1990, it opened to the general public as a science museum, "Science World".
- BC Place Stadium – All-purpose domed sports stadium (primarily for the BC Lions & Vancouver Whitecaps), home of the opening of Expo 86. The stadium was also home of the 2010 Winter Olympic Games, opening and closing ceremonies. BC Place opened June 19, 1983. SkyTrain's Stadium-Chinatown Station (then, "Stadium Station") was built for this landmark in 1985, and has since served all major sporting and concert events since 1986. In May 2010, the landmark teflon roof was deflated, and it was replaced with a new retractable roof, as well as overall structural upgrades and a complete interior design makeover. BC Place reopened on September 30, 2011 as the world's largest cable-supported retractable-roof stadium.
- Canada Place – The Canada Government pavilion is now a major downtown convention centre and cruise ship docks. It has seen major use over the years and was expanded to allow for bigger cruise ships to dock in 1999. In 2009, a companion building immediately to the northwest was completed. SkyTrain's terminus Waterfront Station served Canada Place in 1986. A special shuttle train between Waterfront and Stadium Station was used throughout the duration of the fair to get patrons between the Canada Pavilion and main Expo site along False Creek.
- Plaza of Nations – This space has been used as an outdoor concert venue and public plaza with the surrounding buildings used as office space and nightclubs. Since Expo ended, the glass canopy that was connected to the adjacent office buildings was found unsafe and torn down, while in 2007 it was decided that the office buildings will be demolished. The B.C. Pavilion structure remains, and is the site of the, now former (and vacant), Edgewater Casino. Once the offices are demolished it will leave Canada Place, the B.C. Pavilion and Science World as the only remaining structures from Expo directly left on the Expo site.

After the fair closed, many of the attractions were auctioned off to buyers. The dispersed Expo 86 buildings include:

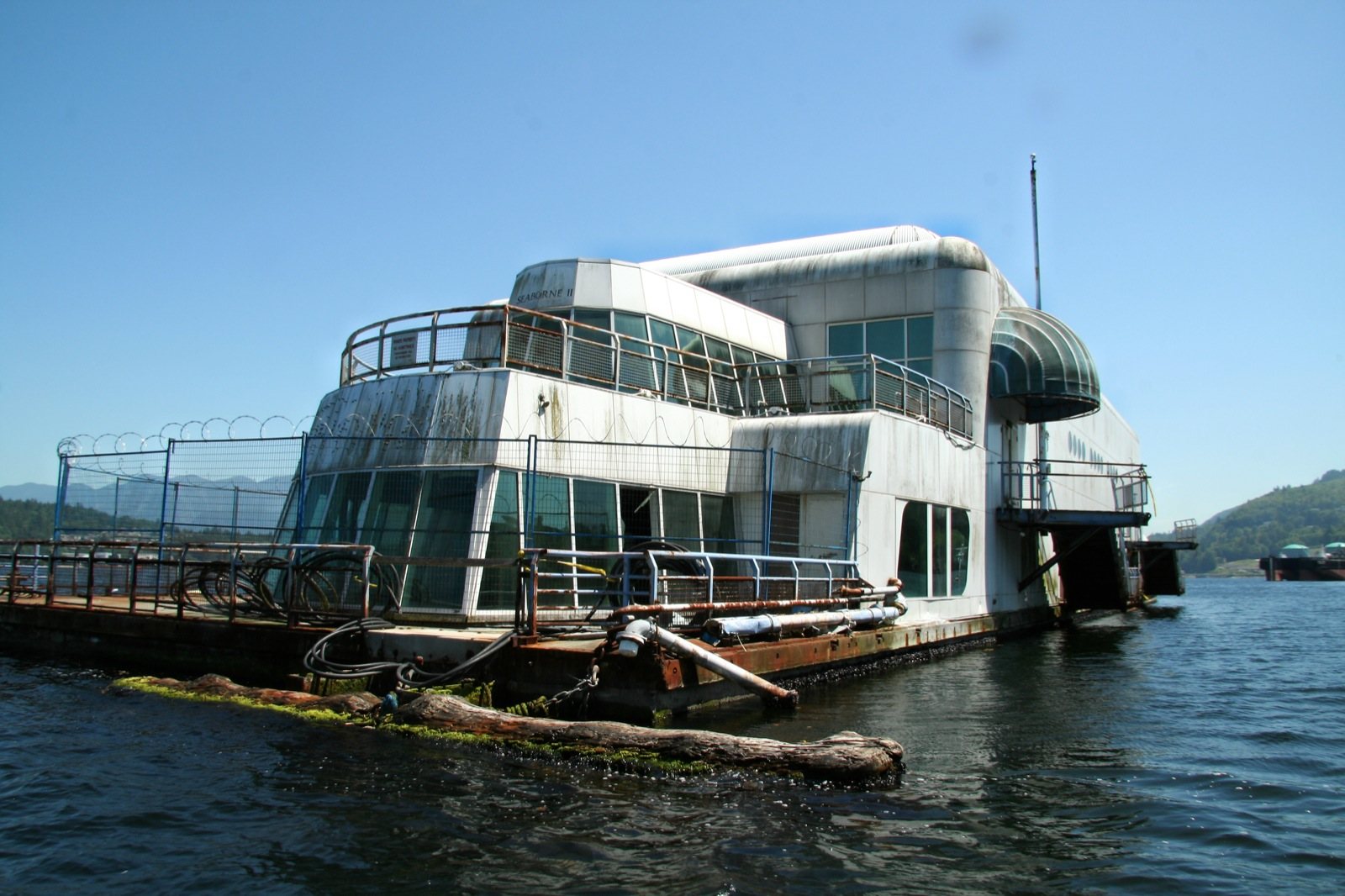
The McBarge shown anchored in Burrard Inlet next to an oil refinery in 2006.

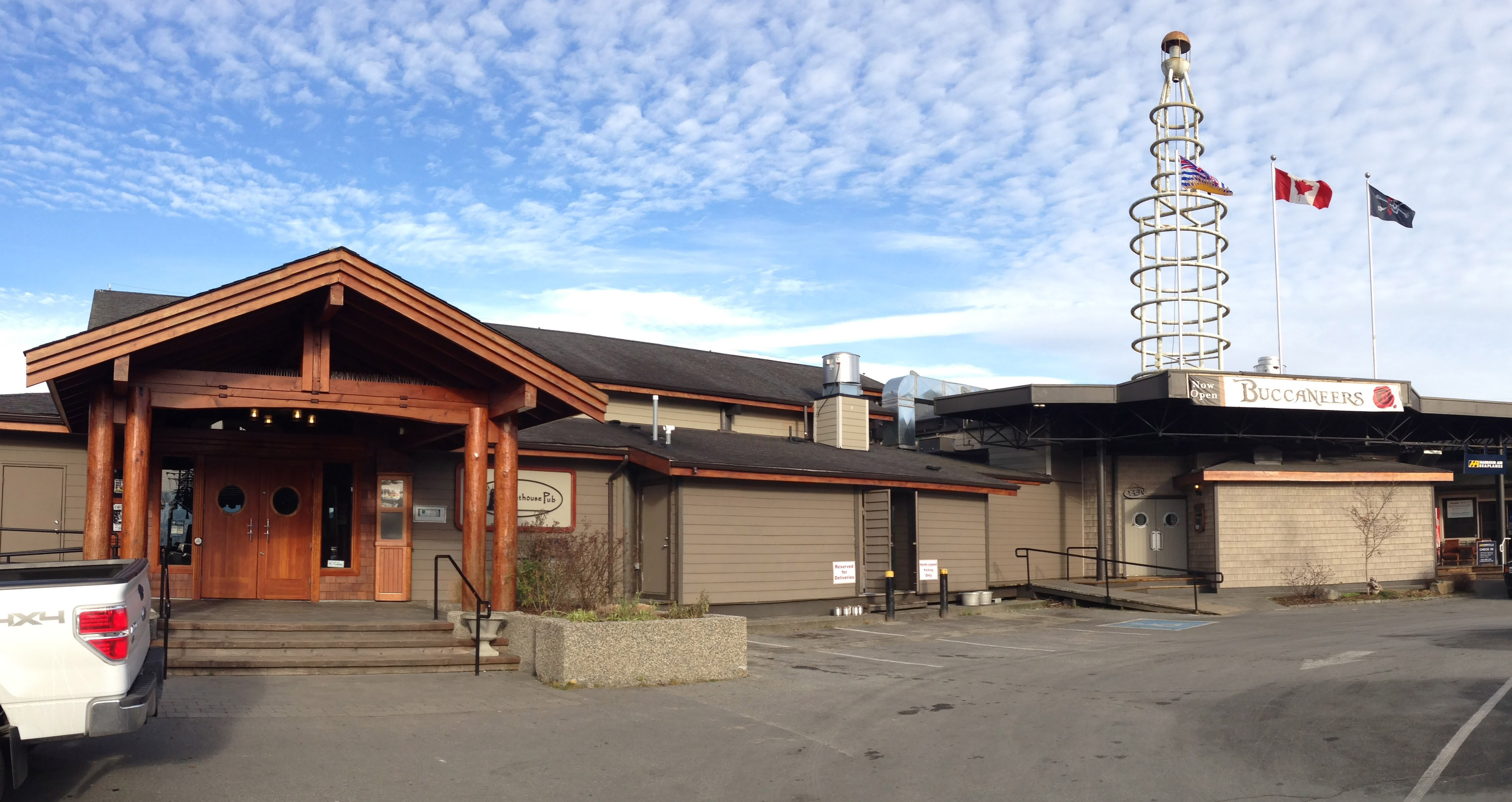
The pub on the left was the China Gate Restaurant, and is now the Lighthouse Pub in Sechelt BC; the lighthouse on the right was a spaceship atop a McDonald's.

- Monorail – now located at Alton Towers Theme Park in England
- McBarge (officially Friendship 500) – a floating McDonald's. After the fair, it was abandoned in the waters of Burrard Inlet, Burnaby (locally known as "McDerelict"). It could be seen when riding the West Coast Express. It was moved in 2015 for refurbishment to Maple Ridge, British Columbia, where it capsized in 2025.
- Space Ship McDonald's The spaceship motif from the restaurant was dismantled and the wings were removed. The remodelled pieces were then shipped to Sechelt and reconstructed as a lighthouse to go atop the Lighthouse Pub.
- China Gate – donated by the Chinese Government to the City of Vancouver. The landmark was relocated in 1987 to Pender Street in Vancouver's Chinatown.
- China Gate Cafe was dismantled and moved to Sechelt BC and is now the home to the Lighthouse Pub.
- World's largest ice hockey stick – once displayed in Duncan, British Columbia at the local hockey rink. Dismantled in 2024 and turned into collectable memorabilia.
- Scream Machine roller coaster – now Ninja at Six Flags St. Louis
- Spirit Catcher sculpture – now installed along the waterfront of Barrie, Ontario
- Inukshuk – once used at the Northwest Territories Pavilion, was relocated to English Bay beach in 1988. It was an inspiration for the logo for the 2010 Winter Olympics.
- Site Furniture – all sorts of brightly painted remnants were relocated to the Pacific National Exhibition on East Hastings Street, and to other parks and public areas in Greater Vancouver.
- Folklife Pavilion – most of the Folklife Pavilion buildings were dismantled into pieces, shipped by barge and reconstructed as the Folklife Village, the main shopping centre on Gabriola Island, BC
- UFO H_{2}O – the water park is now at Mount Layton Hot Springs Resort in Terrace, British Columbia.
- Dragon boats – the six teak wooden boats used to celebrate Hong Kong (pavilion) Day by holding a dragon boat racing festival were raced annually for a number of years before being put into dry dock. In 2015 the original 6, plus 3 more teak and 6 Taiwanese dragon boats, were transferred to Salmon Arm, BC and completely restored.
- Expo building modules – Numerous former pavilion structures were disassembled and reconstructed, largely for industrial use throughout the Lower Mainland, and few have survived to 2013. They can be identified by their distinctive peaked corners with exposed tubular girders. They can be found at Tillbury Industrial Park in Delta, British Columbia.
- The USSR Pavilion – The USSR Pavilion had a special roof designed with triangles which allowed for maximum floor space coverage without any beams coming down to support it save for the outside of the building. It was dismantled and relocated now housing machinery at the Kruger Products paper plant in New Westminster, British Columbia.
- Bench Seating – iconic painted wire grid bench seating, coloured as the different zone colours of the fair, with formed concrete bases and the "86" logo branded into the sides, can be seen at various locales around the Greater Vancouver area, notably along the White Rock beach promenade.
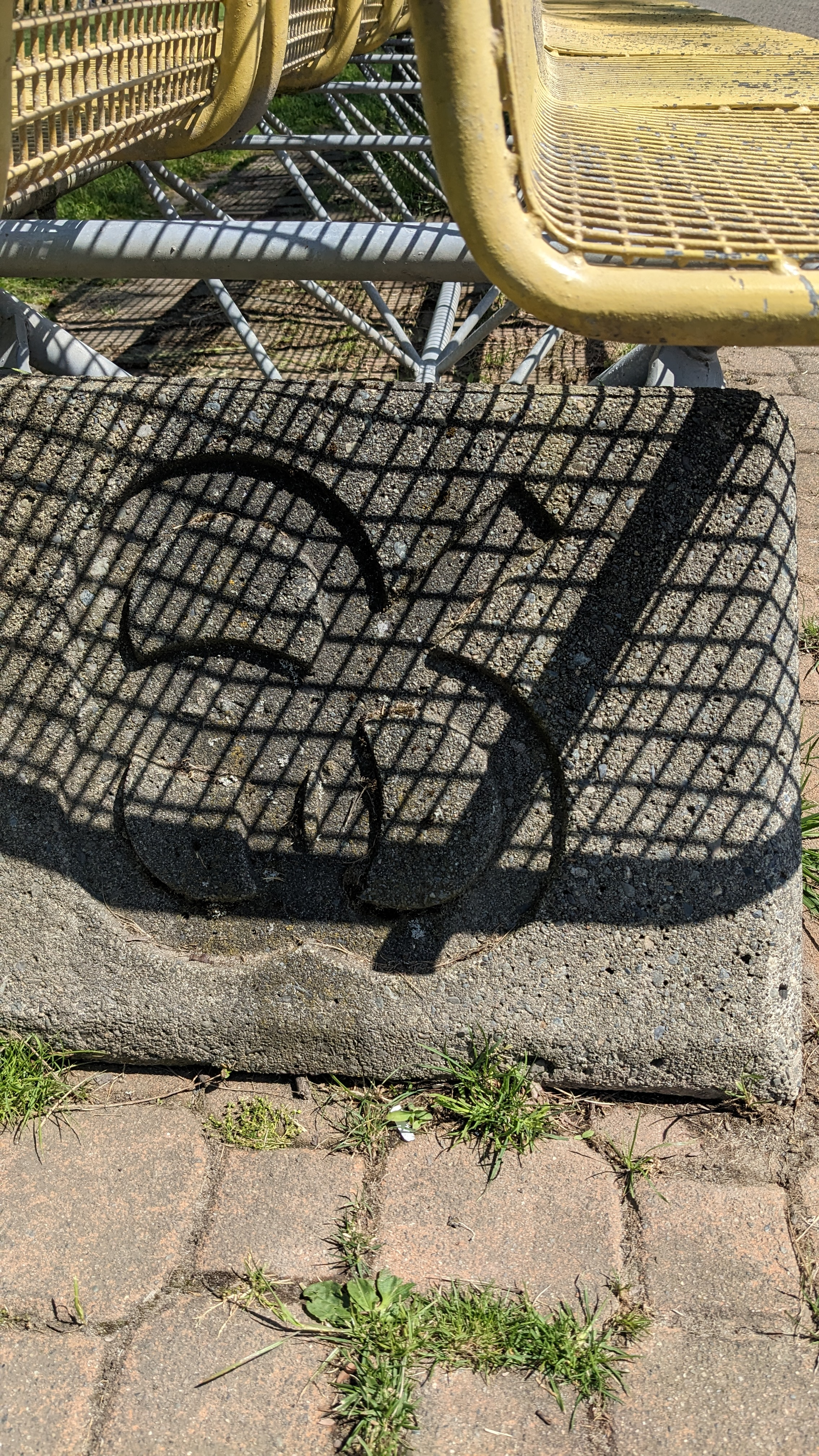
  One of the many Expo 86 benches still in use along the promenade of White Rock British Columbia
- Log Flume Ride – shipped across Canada on 16 large trucks and installed at Upper Clements Parks in the Annapolis Valley, Nova Scotia.
- Pier A large steel pier constructed for use during Expo is now in use on the north side of Keats Island as the main dock for Barnabas Landing. For years it was light green and pink (the original colours), but it has been painted a uniform blue.

=== Reunions ===
A group of former Expo 86 employees conducted a 20th anniversary reunion for Expo participants on May 2, 2006, at the Plaza of Nations site.

A group of former BC Pavilion employees celebrated the 20th anniversary of the close of Expo 86 at a reunion on October 13, 2006, at the former Expo Centre (now Science World).

Celebrating 25 years since its opening of Expo 86, Vancouver is Awesome and Yelp teamed up and threw a party at Science World on May 6, 2011.

=== Scandal ===
In 1988, the site was sold to the Concord Pacific development corporation for a fraction of the original cost, a move that proved to be extremely controversial. Premier William Vander Zalm and Peter Toigo were accused of influence peddling in the sale.

== Accidents ==
While opening the world's fair, Diana, Princess of Wales briefly fainted onto her then-husband in a crowded hall in the California Pavilion. She recovered quickly in the washroom and left half an hour later. Prince Charles later said that her fainting spell was a result of heat and exhaustion. However, the Princess confessed several years later that it was actually caused by not having kept down any food for several days, the result of her eating disorder. She was chastised by her husband for not "fainting gracefully behind a door."

On May 9, 1986, 9-year-old Karen Ford of Nanaimo, died at the Canadian Pavilion. She was crushed while on a revolving turntable that connected two semi-circular theatres in the pavilion. The revolving table was shut down for some time after the accident but was put back in service with a number of new safety measures.

== In popular media ==
- The Vancouver-based indie band Said the Whale recorded a song called "False Creek Change" about the changes that Expo 86 brought to the area. The song starts: "False Creek changed in 86 / The year Expo exploited her shore / It's been 22 years laying down bricks / There's no room for me here any more."
- Death Cab for Cutie, from nearby Bellingham, Washington, also has a song entitled "Expo '86" on their album Transatlanticism.
- Scenes from Vancouver (some of the Expo) have appeared in a video edition of the song "If I Had Wings", composed in 1986 by children's singer/songwriter Hap Palmer.
- Cheers episode "Money Dearest" featured Cliff Claven discussing his return from Expo 86.
- The band Wolf Parade also released an LP entitled Expo 86 in 2010.
- Archie Comics put out a special edition where they came to Expo 86.

== See also ==
- 1986 in Canada
- Canadian National Exhibition
- Gaselle
- Transitions
