= List of Helix band members =

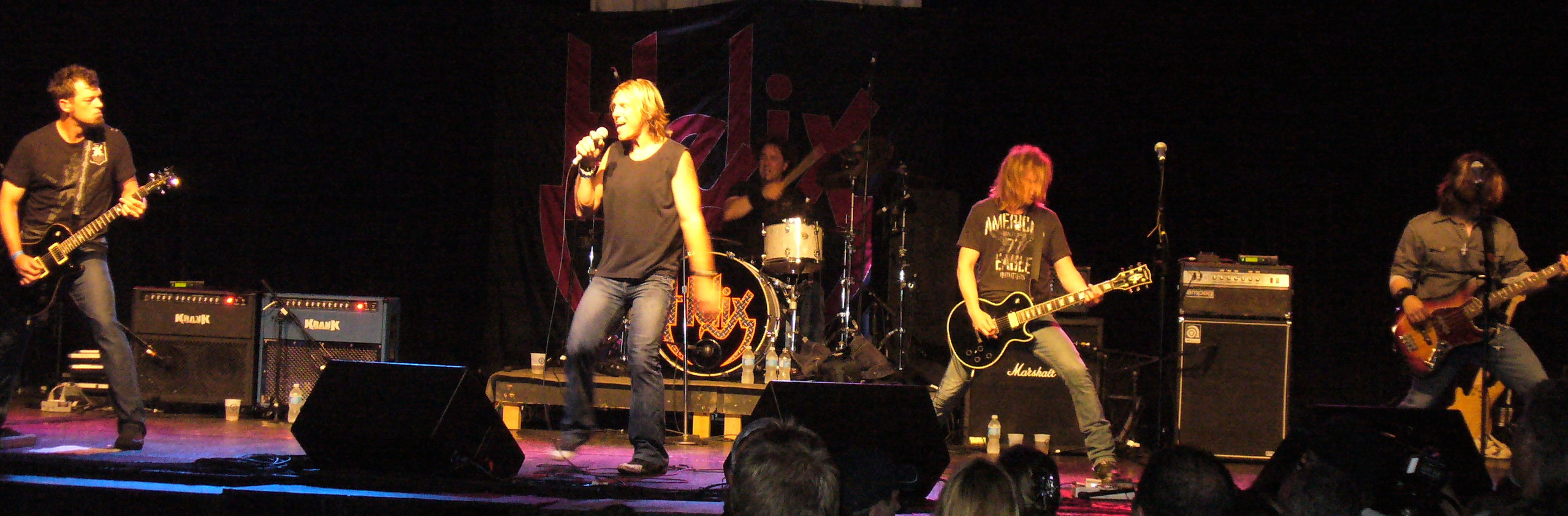
Helix performing live in 2008

Helix is a Canadian hard rock band from Kitchener, Ontario. Formed in 1974, the group originally featured lead vocalist Brian Vollmer, guitarists Ron Watson and Rick "Minstrel" Trembley, bassist Keith "Bert" Zurbrigg, and drummer Bruce Arnold. By the time they recorded their debut album Breaking Loose in 1979, Vollmer and Zurbrigg were joined by guitarists Brent Doerner and Paul Hackman, and drummer Brian Doerner. The band's current lineup includes Vollmer alongside bassist Daryl Gray (from 1984 to 2002, and since 2009), and guitarists Gary Borden (from 1996 to 1998, and since 2019) and Chris Julke (since 2014).

== History ==
=== 1974–1989 ===
Helix was formed in 1974 by Brian Vollmer, Ron Watson, Rick Trembley, Keith Zurbrigg, Bruce Arnold and Don Simmons. The group was initially known as the Helix Field Band, before they brought in manager Bill Seip who encouraged the members to shorten the name. Around the same time as Seip's arrival, roughly six months after the group formed, Trembley was fired by band leaders Arnold and Watson and was not replaced. Watson left shortly thereafter, replaced by Brent "The Doctor" Doerner. Helix began touring Canadian bars after Seip took over management, although early on both Arnold and Simmons left the band. The pair were replaced by Doerner's brother Brian and Paul Hackman, respectively. This lineup recorded and released the band's debut album Breaking Loose in 1979.

After touring in promotion of Breaking Loose, Brian Doerner was replaced by Leo Niebudek; after recording one track for White Lace & Black Leather, Zurbrigg was also replaced by Mike Uzelac. In 1982, Niebudek was replaced by former Starchild drummer Greg "Fritz" Hinz, who debuted on No Rest for the Wicked. Just before a US tour to promote the album, bassist Uzelac became a born again Christian and left the band, replaced by touring member Pete Guy. Uzelac briefly returned later in the summer, before Mark Rector took over until the end of the year, starting with a European tour supporting Kiss. Daryl Gray took over as full-time bassist at the beginning of 1984 to record Walkin' the Razor's Edge. This lineup also released Long Way to Heaven in 1985 and Wild in the Streets in 1987.

=== 1989–2002 ===
After the touring cycle for Wild in the Streets, guitarist Brent Doerner departed from Helix in 1989. The remaining four members recorded Back for Another Taste without a second guitarist. For the album's tour starting the following summer, the group was joined by its first American member, guitarist Denny Balicki (later Blake). On July 5, 1992, when the band was travelling back to Kitchener after a short local tour, a bus carrying Paul Hackman, Daryl Gray and two of Helix's road crew members crashed near the city of Kamloops, killing Hackman on impact. Despite this tragedy, Helix continued later in the year, with Brent Doerner returning and Greg "Shredder" Fraser taking over from Hackman. The new lineup released It's a Business Doing Pleasure on Aquarius Records in 1993.

Following the release of the album, Doerner left again and Helix toured with rotating part-time touring guitarists alongside Fraser, including Gary Borden, Rick Mead and Mark Chichkan. When Fraser left in 1996, Borden took over as his official replacement; when drummer Greg Hinz left later the same year, Glen "Archie" Gamble took his place. During this flexible period, the band recorded the bulk of the material for 1998's Half-Alive, which also included a handful of tracks recorded with Hackman before his death. By 2000, Helix had returned to a more regular touring schedule and settled on a lineup of Vollmer, Gray and Gamble alongside guitarists Gerry Finn and Mike Hall. In 2001, Harem Scarem drummer Darren Smith took over from Gerry Finn, who left to join David Usher's band.

=== 2002–2007 ===
In early 2002, Vollmer and Gray fell out after a recording session and the bassist left the band. He was replaced by Stan Miczek, also formerly of Harem Scarem, before all but Gamble were dismissed in the summer as the band relocated to London; the new lineup included guitarists Shawn Sanders and Dan Fawcett, and bassist Jeff "Stan" Fountain. Before the new incarnation could record anything, however, Vollmer fired Fawcett in early 2004 and Sanders chose to leave. In May the group released Rockin' in My Outer Space, which featured Rainer "Rhino" (lead guitar, keyboards) and Cindy Weichmann (backing vocals, guitar, percussion, keyboards); both musicians became official members of the band, and after the album's recording Jim Lawson was brought in on second lead guitar.

On July 17, 2004, Helix marked its 30th anniversary with a special concert featuring a wide range of former band members, which was released as 30th Anniversary Concert. Included were original members Ron Watson, Keith Zurbrigg, Bruce Arnold and Don Simmons, alongside numerous other performers. The next February, it was announced that Gamble had left the band after nearly ten years to focus on his other group Popjoy, with Brian Doerner returning in his place. The following spring, Vollmer decided to part with the Weichmanns and brought in Rick VanDyk as a new guitarist. At the same time, Doerner departed again and was replaced by Brent "Ned" Niemi. In March 2007, Fountain was replaced on bass by Paul Fonseca, a bandmate of both VanDyk and Niemi.

=== Since 2007 ===
Helix released The Power of Rock and Roll in 2007, although none of the current members besides Vollmer performed on the album. This was followed the next year by A Heavy Mental Christmas, which featured all but Lawson. In February 2009, it was announced that Crash Kelly's Sean Kelly had replaced Fonseca on bass. The following month, Helix also revealed that Brent Doerner had replaced VanDyk for a third tenure in the band, while Rob MacEachern (who played drums on several recent Helix releases) had taken over from Niemi. By August that year, a reunion of the 'classic' 1984–1989 lineup of Vollmer, Doerner, Daryl Gray and Greg Hinz had been announced for a tour starting in October; later, Kaleb "Duckman" Duck was announced as the group's second guitarist.

In June 2012, Helix announced that Brent Doerner would be leaving the band for a third time in September. He was replaced by John Claus. By February 2014, Claus had been replaced by Chris Julke, who recorded the band's next album Bastard of the Blues. This was followed in 2019 by Old School, before Duck left in November that year and was replaced briefly by former guitarist Mark Chichkan and then by Gary Borden.

Original keyboardist Don Simmons died on July 25, 2021. Dan Fawcett, guitarist for Helix from 2002 to 2004, died on 6 November 2022 at age 52 after being stabbed in Gibbons Park, in London, Ontario. Craig Allan, 48, was charged with second degree murder, while Allana Lebars, 41, pleaded guilty to manslaughter after being originally charged with second-degree murder.

Drummer Greg "Fritz" Hinz died on February 16, 2024.

== Members ==
=== Current ===
Image	Name	Years active	Instruments	Release contributions
	Brian Vollmer	1974–present	lead vocals; cowbell	all Helix releases
	Daryl Gray	1984–2002; 2009–present	bass; keyboards; mandolin; percussion; guitar; backing vocals	all Helix releases from Walkin' the Razor's Edge (1984) to Half-Alive (1998), and from Vagabond Bones (2009) onwards; 30th Anniversary Concert (2009) – two tracks only
	Gary Borden	1996–1998 (part-time touring 1993–1996); 2019–present	guitar; backing vocals	Half-Alive (1998)
	Chris Julke	2014–present	guitar; backing vocals	Bastard of the Blues (2014); A Helix Christmas (2018)
	Jamie Constant	2024–present	drums	none

=== Former ===
Image	Name	Years active	Instruments	Release contributions
	Keith "Bert" Zurbrigg	1974–1980	bass; backing vocals	Breaking Loose (1979); White Lace & Black Leather (1981) – one track only; 30th Anniversary Concert (2004)
	Bruce Arnold	1974–1976	drums	30th Anniversary Concert (2004) – one track only
	Don Simmons	1974–1976 (died 2021)	keyboards	30th Anniversary Concert (2004) – one track only
	Ron Watson	1974–1976 (died 2019)	guitar	30th Anniversary Concert (2004) – one track only
	Rick "Minstrel" Trembley	1974–1975	guitar	none
	Brent "The Doctor" Doerner	1976–1989; 1992–1993; 2009–2012	guitar; mandolin; backing and additional lead vocals	all Helix releases from Breaking Loose (1979) to It's a Business Doing Pleasure (1993); Live! in Buffalo (2001); Rockin' in My Outer Space (2004) – one track only; 30th Anniversary Concert (2004); Vagabond Bones (2009); Smash Hits... Unplugged! (2010); Skin in the Game (2011)
	Paul Hackman	1976–1992 (until his death)	guitar; backing vocals	all Helix releases from Breaking Loose (1979) to Back for Another Taste (1990); Half-Alive (1998); Live! in Buffalo (2001); Old School (2019)
	Brian Doerner	1976–1980; 2005–2006	drums; backing vocals	Breaking Loose (1979); Wild in the Streets (1987); Back for Another Taste (1990) – three tracks only; It's a Business Doing Pleasure (1993); Rockin' in My Outer Space (2004) – two tracks only; 30th Anniversary Concert (2004)
	Leo Niebudek	1980–1982	drums	White Lace & Black Leather (1981); 30th Anniversary Concert (2004)
	Greg "Fritz" Hinz	1982–1996; 2009–2024 (died 2024)	drums; percussion; backing vocals	all Helix releases from No Rest for the Wicked (1983) to Live! in Buffalo (2001), and from Vagabond Bones (2009) onwards; 30th Anniversary Concert (2004)
	Mike Uzelac	1980–1983; 1983 (stand-in)	bass; backing vocals	White Lace & Black Leather (1981); No Rest for the Wicked (1983); Live! in Buffalo (2001)
	Pete Guy	1983	bass	none
	Mark Rektor	1983	bass	none
	Denny Balicki (later known as Denny Blake)	1990–1992	guitar; backing vocals	Half-Alive (1998)
	Greg "Shredder" Fraser	1992–1996	guitar; backing vocals	It's a Business Doing Pleasure (1993)
	Mark Chichkan	1993–1999 (part-time)	guitar; backing vocals	Half-Alive (1998)
	Rick Mead	1993–1998 (part-time)	guitar	Half-Alive (1998)
	Glen "Archie" Gamble	1996–2005	drums	Half-Alive (1998); Rockin' in My Outer Space (2004); 30th Anniversary Concert (2004)
	Gerry Finn	2000–2002 (part-time touring 1998–2000)	guitar; backing vocals	none
	Mike Hall	2000–2002	guitar; backing vocals	none
	Darren Smith	2001–2002	guitar; backing vocals	none
	Stan Miczek	2002	bass; backing vocals	none
	Jeff "Stan" Fountain	2002–2007	bass; backing vocals	all Helix releases from Rockin' in My Outer Space (2004) to The Power of Rock and Roll (2007)
	Shawn Sanders	2002–2004	guitar; backing vocals	none
	Dan Fawcett (died 2022)	2002–2004	guitar; backing vocals	none
	Rainer "Rhino" Wiechmann	2004–2006	guitar; keyboards; backing vocals	Rockin' in My Outer Space (2004); 30th Anniversary Concert (2004)
	Cindy Weichmann	2004–2006	backing vocals; guitar; percussion; keyboards	Rockin' in My Outer Space (2004); 30th Anniversary Concert (2004)
	Jim Lawson	2004–2009 (touring only)	guitar; backing vocals	30th Anniversary Concert (2004)
	Rick VanDyk	2006–2009	guitar; backing vocals	A Heavy Mental Christmas (2008)
	Brent "Ned" Niemi	2006–2009	drums; backing vocals	A Heavy Mental Christmas (2008)
	Paul Fonseca	2007–2009	bass; backing vocals	A Heavy Mental Christmas (2008)
	Sean Kelly	2009	bass; guitar; banjo; backing vocals	Vagabond Bones (2009); Smash Hits... Unplugged! (2010)
	Rob MacEachern	2009	drums; percussion	Get Up! (2006); The Power of Rock and Roll (2007); Vagabond Bones (2009)
	Kaleb "Duckman" Duck	2009–2019	guitar; backing vocals	all Helix releases from Smash Hits... Unplugged! (2010) to Old School (2019)
	John Claus	2012–2014	guitar; keyboards; backing vocals	none

== Lineups ==
Period	Members	Releases
1974–1975 (as the Helix Field Band)	Brian Vollmer – lead vocals; Ron Watson – guitar; Rick Trembley – guitar; Keith Zurbrigg – bass, backing vocals; Bruce Arnold – drums; Don Simmons – keyboards	none
1975–1976	Brian Vollmer – lead vocals; Ron Watson – guitar; Keith Zurbrigg – bass, backing vocals; Bruce Arnold – drums; Don Simmons – keyboards	none
1976	Brian Vollmer – lead vocals; Brent Doerner – guitar, backing vocals; Keith Zurbrigg – bass, backing vocals; Bruce Arnold – drums; Don Simmons – keyboards	none
1976–1980	Brian Vollmer – lead vocals; Brent Doerner – guitar, backing vocals; Paul Hackman – guitar, backing vocals; Keith Zurbrigg – bass, backing vocals; Brian Doerner – drums, backing vocals	Breaking Loose (1979)
1980	Brian Vollmer – lead vocals; Brent Doerner – guitar, backing vocals; Paul Hackman – guitar, backing vocals; Keith Zurbrigg – bass, backing vocals; Leo Niebudek – drums	White Lace & Black Leather (1981) – Zurbrigg recorded one track before leaving
1980–1982	Brian Vollmer – lead vocals; Brent Doerner – guitar, backing vocals; Paul Hackman – guitar, backing vocals; Mike Uzelac – bass, backing vocals; Leo Niebudek – drums	White Lace & Black Leather (1981) – Zurbrigg recorded one track before leaving
1982–1983	Brian Vollmer – lead vocals; Brent Doerner – guitar, backing vocals; Paul Hackman – guitar, backing vocals; Mike Uzelac – bass, backing vocals; Greg Hinz – drums, percussion, backing vocals	No Rest for the Wicked (1983)
June – July 1983	Brian Vollmer – lead vocals; Brent Doerner – guitar, backing vocals; Paul Hackman – guitar, backing vocals; Greg Hinz – drums, percussion, backing vocals; Pete Guy – bass (touring member)	none
August – September 1983	Brian Vollmer – lead vocals; Brent Doerner – guitar, backing vocals; Paul Hackman – guitar, backing vocals; Mike Uzelac – bass, backing vocals; Greg Hinz – drums, percussion, backing vocals	Live! in Buffalo (2001)
October – December 1983	Brian Vollmer – lead vocals; Brent Doerner – guitar, backing vocals; Paul Hackman – guitar, backing vocals; Greg Hinz – drums, percussion, backing vocals; Mark Rector – bass (touring member)	none
January 1984 – fall 1989	Brian Vollmer – lead vocals; Brent Doerner – guitar, backing vocals; Paul Hackman – guitar, backing vocals; Daryl Gray – bass, keyboards, backing vocals; Greg Hinz – drums, percussion, backing vocals	Walkin' the Razor's Edge (1984); Live at the Marquee (1985); Long Way to Heaven (1985); Wild in the Streets (1987); Over 60 Minutes With... (1989) – two previously unreleased tracks; Half-Alive (1998) – one track
Fall 1989 – summer 1990	Brian Vollmer – lead vocals; Paul Hackman – guitar, backing vocals; Daryl Gray – bass, keyboards, backing vocals; Greg Hinz – drums, percussion, backing vocals	Back for Another Taste (1990)
Summer 1990 – July 1992	Brian Vollmer – lead vocals; Paul Hackman – guitar, backing vocals; Denny Balicki – guitar, backing vocals; Daryl Gray – bass, keyboards, backing vocals; Greg Hinz – drums, percussion, backing vocals	Half-Alive (1998) – three tracks
Fall 1992 – summer 1993	Brian Vollmer – lead vocals; Brent Doerner – guitar, backing vocals; Greg Fraser – guitar, backing vocals; Daryl Gray – bass, keyboards, backing vocals; Greg Hinz – drums, percussion, backing vocals	It's a Business Doing Pleasure (1993)
1993–1996 (rotating touring lineup)	Brian Vollmer – lead vocals; Greg Fraser – guitar, backing vocals; Daryl Gray – bass, keyboards, backing vocals; Greg Hinz – drums, percussion, backing vocals; Gary Borden – guitar (part-time member); Mark Chichkan – guitar (part-time member); Rick Mead – guitar (part-time member)	none
1996 (rotating touring lineup)	Brian Vollmer – lead vocals; Daryl Gray – bass, keyboards, backing vocals; Greg Hinz – drums, percussion, backing vocals; Gary Borden – guitar (part-time member); Mark Chichkan – guitar (part-time member); Rick Mead – guitar (part-time member)	Half-Alive (1998) – remaining tracks
1996–1998 (rotating touring lineup)	Brian Vollmer – lead vocals; Daryl Gray – bass, keyboards, backing vocals; Archie Gamble – drums; Gary Borden – guitar (part-time member); Mark Chichkan – guitar (part-time member); Rick Mead – guitar (part-time member)	Half-Alive (1998) – remaining tracks
1998–1999 (part-time touring lineup)	Brian Vollmer – lead vocals; Daryl Gray – bass, keyboards, backing vocals; Archie Gamble – drums; Mark Chichkan – guitar (part-time member); Gerry Finn – guitar (part-time member)	none
2000–2001	Brian Vollmer – lead vocals; Gerry Finn – guitar, backing vocals; Mike Hall – guitar, backing vocals; Daryl Gray – bass, keyboards, backing vocals; Archie Gamble – drums	none
2001–2002	Brian Vollmer – lead vocals; Mike Hall – guitar, backing vocals; Darren Smith – guitar, backing vocals; Daryl Gray – bass, keyboards, backing vocals; Archie Gamble – drums	none
Early – summer 2002	Brian Vollmer – lead vocals; Mike Hall – guitar, backing vocals; Darren Smith – guitar, backing vocals; Stan Miczek – bass, backing vocals; Archie Gamble – drums	none
Fall 2002 – early 2004	Brian Vollmer – lead vocals; Shawn Sanders – guitar, backing vocals; Dan Fawcett – guitar, backing vocals; Jeff Fountain – bass, backing vocals; Archie Gamble – drums	none
Early – spring 2004	Brian Vollmer – lead vocals; Rainer Wiechmann – guitar, keyboards, vocals; Cindy Wiechmann – guitar, percussion, vocals; Jeff Fountain – bass, backing vocals; Archie Gamble – drums	Rockin' in My Outer Space (2004)
Summer 2004 – February 2005	Brian Vollmer – lead vocals; Rainer Wiechmann – guitar, keyboards, vocals; Cindy Wiechmann – guitar, percussion, vocals; Jim Lawson – guitar, backing vocals; Jeff Fountain – bass, backing vocals; Archie Gamble – drums	30th Anniversary Concert (2004) – features numerous previous members
February 2005 – March 2006	Brian Vollmer – lead vocals; Rainer Wiechmann – guitar, keyboards, vocals; Cindy Wiechmann – guitar, percussion, vocals; Jim Lawson – guitar, backing vocals; Jeff Fountain – bass, backing vocals; Brian Doerner – drums, backing vocals	none
April 2006 – March 2007	Brian Vollmer – lead vocals; Rick VanDyk – guitar, backing vocals; Jim Lawson – guitar, backing vocals; Jeff Fountain – bass, backing vocals; Brent Niemi – drums, backing vocals	Get Up! (2006) – features Vollmer and Fountain only
March 2007 – February 2009	Brian Vollmer – lead vocals; Rick VanDyk – guitar, backing vocals; Jim Lawson – guitar, backing vocals; Paul Fonseca – bass, backing vocals; Brent Niemi – drums, backing vocals	The Power of Rock and Roll (2007) – features Vollmer only; A Heavy Mental Christmas (2008) – does not feature Lawson
February – August 2009	Brian Vollmer – lead vocals; Brent Doerner – guitar, backing vocals; Jim Lawson – guitar, backing vocals; Sean Kelly – bass, guitar, backing vocals; Rob MacEachern – drums, percussion	Vagabond Bones (2009)
August – October 2009	Brian Vollmer – lead vocals; Brent Doerner – guitar, backing vocals; Jim Lawson – guitar, backing vocals; Daryl Gray – bass, keyboards, backing vocals; Greg Hinz – drums, percussion, backing vocals	Vagabond Bones (2009)
October 2009 – September 2012	Brian Vollmer – lead vocals; Brent Doerner – guitar, backing vocals; Kaleb Duck – guitar, backing vocals; Daryl Gray – bass, keyboards, backing vocals; Greg Hinz – drums, percussion, backing vocals	Smash Hits... Unplugged! (2010); Skin in the Game (2011)
October 2012 – February 2014	Brian Vollmer – lead vocals; Kaleb Duck – guitar, backing vocals; John Claus – guitar, keyboards, backing vocals; Daryl Gray – bass, keyboards, backing vocals; Greg Hinz – drums, percussion, backing vocals	none
February 2014 – November 2019	Brian Vollmer – lead vocals; Kaleb Duck – guitar, backing vocals; Chris Julke – guitar; Daryl Gray – bass, keyboards, backing vocals; Greg Hinz – drums, percussion, backing vocals	Bastard of the Blues (2014); Old School (2019)
November 2019 – February 2024	Brian Vollmer – lead vocals; Kaleb Duck – guitar, backing vocals; Gary Borden – guitar, backing vocals; Daryl Gray – bass, keyboards, backing vocals; Greg Hinz – drums, percussion, backing vocals	none as yet
February 2024 – present	Brian Vollmer – lead vocals; Kaleb Duck – guitar, backing vocals; Gary Borden – guitar, backing vocals; Daryl Gray – bass, keyboards, backing vocals; Jamie Constant – drums	none
