= 30th Anniversary Concert =

Video by Helix
- Released: 2004
- Recorded: July 17, 2004
- Genres: Heavy metal, hard rock
- Label: EMI
- Director: Kent Sobey
- Producer: Brian Vollmer

Helix chronology
S.E.X. Rated (1991)	30th Anniversary Concert (2004)	30 Years Of Helix: No Rest For The Wicked (2004)

30th Anniversary Concert is a DVD release by Canadian hard rock band Helix. It is a live concert recorded on July 17, 2004 at the Brantford, Ontario Sanderson Centre. It is a complete concert and it features appearances from band members past and present to celebrate the 30th anniversary of the band. The concert is interspersed with interviews, studio recordings and photo montages.

== History ==
The concept of doing special concerts with past and present members was not new to Helix. In 1991, Helix performed a special celebratory show at Lulu's Roadhouse in Kitchener, Ontario which featured the return of original bassist Keith "Burt" Zurbrigg, former drummer Brian Doerner and former guitarist Brent Doerner for a special setlist, one night only. Later in 1992, the Doerners joined Helix on a Western Canadian tour when regular drummer Greg "Fritz" Hinz and guitarist Denny Balicky were unavailable. While that tour should have been a special occasion for the band and fans, it was marred by the death of guitarist Paul Hackman in a tragic tour bus accident.

Much later in 2004, Helix celebrated their 30th anniversary as a band. Lead vocalist Brian Vollmer prepared several releases, and another special concert to take place that year, this time with more past members taking part. Before the scheduled concert, the then-current Helix lineup was shaken up by the departure of guitar player Dan Fawcett. He was followed shortly thereafter by co-guitarist Shaun Sanders. With the concert looming, Vollmer quickly had to replace two guitar players. Rainer Wiechmann was then producing the new Helix studio album, called Rockin' in My Outer Space, and his wife Cindy sang backup vocals. Vollmer first encountered the Wiechmanns in Newfoundland when their band, KAOS, opened for Helix on the 1985 Long Way to Heaven tour. Rainer contributed guitar parts to the album and eventually joined the band. Cindy was asked to join at their first rehearsal together. New second guitarist Jim Lawson was known to Vollmer via his old band, Cherry Smash. Cherry Smash and Helix were mutually managed by William Seip previously.

The special concert involved reunions of band members from the original lineup onwards. Several significant members were not present for various reasons. Former bassist and member of the "Capitol Years" lineup Daryl Gray was estranged from Helix, and former bassist Mike Uzelac of the "Early 80s" lineup was classified as a missing person at the time (Gray would later reconcile with the band and Uzelac made a public reappearance in the late 2000s; both have since played in various incarnations of the Helix lineup). Original bassist Keith "Burt" Zurbrigg and current bassist Jeff "Stan" Fountain stood in for them. Rainer Wiechmann stood for the late Paul Hackman on his songs.

Greg "Shredder" Fraser, the former Brighton Rock guitarist who played in Helix from 1992–1996, was absent. Former guitar player Gerry Finn (ex-Killer Dwarfs), who was in the band during the late 1990s, was originally announced to appear, but did not. While the concert included a reunion of five original Helix members, a sixth, guitarist Rick "Minstrel" Trembley, was not involved. None of these former members had recorded on any Helix studio albums.

The other new releases to celebrate the 30th anniversary were compilations albums. Never Trust Anyone Over 30 was released in the US, and Rockin' You For 30 Years in Canada.

== Chapters ==
All songs written by Brian Vollmer and Paul Hackman except where noted.

1. The Band (includes the song "Ave Maria" performed by Brian Vollmer) (6:58)
2. The Sanderson Theatre (5:54)
3. The Concert: "Space Junk" (taped intro) (Rainer Wiechmann)/"Rockin' In My Outer Space" (Bill Gadd, Rob Long, Tony Paleschi, Vollmer) (5:53)
4. "Running Wild In The 21st Century" (3:53)
5. "The Ballad of Sam and Mary" (Gadd, Long, Paleschi, Vollmer) (4:11)
6. "It's Hard to Feel the Sunshine When Your Heart is Full of Rain" (Gadd, Long, Paleschi, Vollmer) (3:35)
7. The Original Helix: "Thinking It Over" (studio recording) (Del Shannon)/"Buff's Bar Blues" (Alex Harvey) (9:59)
8. The Early Years: "I Could Never Leave" (studio recording) (4:01)
9. "Crazy Women" (Brent Doener) (3:41)
10. "You're A Woman Now" (Hackman) (6:59)
11. "Billy Oxygen" (Doerner) (5:08)
12. The Early 80s: "Women, Whiskey & Sin" (studio recording) (Vollmer) (3:36)
13. "It's Too Late" (Doerner) (4:01)
14. "Breaking Loose" (Vollmer, Doerner) (4:23)
15. The Capitol Years: "Give It To You" (studio recording) (4:10)
16. "Gimme Gimme Good Lovin'" (Joey Levine, Richard Rosenblatt) (3:24)
17. "Heavy Metal Love" (3:45)
18. "(Make Me Do) Anything You Want" (Paul Naummann, Danny Taylor) (4:03)
19. "Deep Cuts the Knife" (Hackman, Bob Halligan, Jr. (4:31)
20. "Wild in the Streets" (Hackman, Ray Lyell) (4:30)
21. "Dirty Dog" (Vollmer, Doerner) (3:40)
22. "Rock You" (Halligan) (6:23)
23. "The Kids are All Shakin'" (4:54)
24. Aftermath (includes the song "Danny Boy" performed by Brian Vollmer) (3:15)

Bonus Features

1. 8mm Memories (8:44)

== Personnel ==
=== Concert ===
==== Helix ====
Chapters 1-6, 22-23

- Brian Vollmer – lead vocals
- Jim Lawson – guitar
- Rainer Wiechmann – guitar
- Cindy Wiechmann – acoustic guitar, vocals, keyboards
- Jeff "Stan" Fountain – bass
- Glen "Archie" Gamble – drums

Special guests: Everyone on "Rock You"

==== The Original Helix ====
Chapter 7, "Buff's Bar Blues"

- Brian Vollmer – lead vocals
- Bruce Arnold – drums
- Ron Watson – guitar
- Don Simmons – keyboards
- Keith "Burt" Zurbrigg – bass

==== The early years ====
Chapters 8-11

- Brian Vollmer – lead vocals on all except "Crazy Women" and "Billy Oxygen"
- Brent "The Doctor" Doerner – guitar, lead vocals on "Crazy Women" and "Billy Oxygen"
- Brian Doerner – drums
- Keith "Burt" Zurbrigg – bass
- Rainer Wiechmann – guitar (standing in for Paul Hackman)

Special guests: Cindy Wiechmann and Cheryl Lescom – backing vocals on "You're a Woman Now", Cole G. Benjamin – keyboards on "Billy Oxygen"

==== The Early 80s ====
Chapters 12-14

- Brian Vollmer – lead vocals
- Brent "The Doctor" Doerner – guitar
- Leo Niebudek – drums
- Keith "Burt" Zurbrigg – bass (standing in for Mike Uzelac)
- Rainer Wiechmann – guitar (standing in for Paul Hackman)

==== The Capitol Years ====
Chapters 15-22

- Brian Vollmer – lead vocals
- Brent "The Doctor" Doerner – guitar
- Greg "Fritz" Hinz – drums
- Jeff "Stan" Fountain – bass (standing in for Mike Uzelac and Daryl Gray)
- Rainer Wiechmann – guitar (standing in for Paul Hackman)

Special guest: Ray Lyell – vocals on "Wild in the Streets"

=== Studio songs ===
- Brian Vollmer – lead vocals on all studio songs
- Paul Hackman – guitar on all studio songs
- Brent "The Doctor" Doener – guitar on all studio songs
- Keith "Burt" Zurbrigg – bass on "Thinking It Over" and "I Could Never Leave"
- Brian Doerner – drums on "Thinking It Over" and "I Could Never Leave"
- Mike Uzelac – bass on "Women, Whiskey & Sin"
- Leo Niebudek – drums on "Women, Whiskey & Sin"
- Daryl Gray – bass on "Give It To You"
- Greg "Fritz" Hinz – drums on "Give It To You"

== Reception ==
Author Martin Popoff called the show "damn inspiring" and praised the "pure, stinging guitars, expert mix, perfect volume, and Vollmer's vocals just flowing out of the guy."
