= B-Sides (Helix album) =

Compilation album by Helix
- Released: June 1999
- Genre: Hard rock, heavy metal
- Label: Break

Helix chronology
Deep Cuts: The Best Of (1998)	B-Sides (1999)	Live! in Buffalo (2001)

Professional ratings
Review scores
Source	Rating
AllMusic	2.5/5 stars

B-Sides is a compilation album by the Canadian hard rock band Helix. It is their 13th official release and their fourth compilation album. Despite the title, it actually consists of no B-sides. It was released in conjunction with the 25th anniversary of Helix and featured a reunion of surviving members of the "classic" 1980s lineup on three tracks. It also compiled previously unreleased tracks from 1989 to 1998. As a bonus, it included two unreleased songs from the Helix independent years.

== Track listing and musician credits ==
All songs written by Brian Vollmer and Paul Hackman except where noted.

1. "Jaws of the Tiger" (3:42)
1989 re-recording of a song originally released in 1986 on the "It's Too Late" single, and available on Over 60 minutes with... (1990).

- Brian Vollmer – lead vocals
- Paul Hackman—guitar
- Daryl Gray – bass
- Greg "Fritz" Hinz – drums

2. "Danger Zone" (4:25)
Featuring reunion of surviving members of the "classic" 1980s lineup. Song originally written for Back for Another Taste (1990). This was the final song that Brian Vollmer ever wrote with Paul Hackman.

- Brian Vollmer – lead vocals
- Brent "The Doctor Doerner – guitar
- Daryl Gray – bass
- Greg "Fritz" Hinz – drums

3. "S.E.X. Rated" (2:32) (Brent Doerner, Vollmer)
Featuring reunion of surviving members of the "classic" 1980s lineup. 1999 re-recording of a song originally released in 1991 on the b-side of the cassette single to "Good To The Last Drop".

- Brian Vollmer – lead vocals
- Brent "The Doctor Doerner – guitar
- Daryl Gray – bass
- Greg "Fritz" Hinz – drums

4. "Wanting You" (4:15) (O'Brien, Werner)
1999 recording of a song originally demoed for Back for Another Taste (1990).

- Brian Vollmer – lead vocals
- Dan Brodbeck – guitar, keyboards, bass
- Glen "Archie" Gamble – drums

5. "You Got Me Chained" (3:15) (Vandenburg, Steve Marinaccio, Vollmer)
1999 recording sessions to finish a song originally demoed for Back for Another Taste (1990).

- Brian Vollmer – lead vocals
- Paul Hackman – guitar
- Bill Gadd – guitar
- Daryl Gray – bass
- Steve Marinaccio – bass
- Glen "Archie" Gamble – drums

6. "Devil's Gate" (3:32) (Mark Chichkan)
Recorded as a demo for 1998's Half-ALIVE.

- Brian Vollmer – lead vocals
- Mark Chichkan – guitar
- Daryl Gray – bass
- Glen "Archie" Gamble – drums

7. "Love is a Crazy Game" (4:28) (Hackman, Marinaccio, Ray Lyell)
1999 recording sessions to finish an alternate version demoed for Back for Another Taste (1990), later re-arranged and re-recorded for 1993's It's a Business Doing Pleasure.

- Brian Vollmer – lead vocals
- Paul Hackman – guitars
- Bill Gadd – guitar
- Steve Marinaccio – bass
- Glen "Archie" Gamble – drums

8. "Take It or Leave It" (3:36) (Gord Prior, Novocel)
Recorded as a demo for 1998's Half-ALIVE.

- Brian Vollmer – lead vocals
- Mark Chichkan – guitar
- Daryl Gray – bass
- Glen "Archie" Gamble – drums

9. "You Got The Love That I Like" (4:28) (Hackman, Lyell)
1999 recording of a song originally demoed for Back for Another Taste (1990).

- Brian Vollmer – lead vocals
- Dan Brodbeck – guitar, bass
- Glen "Archie" Gamble – drums

10. "Let The Good Times Roll" (5:53 – music ends at 3:53 followed by 2 minutes of silence) (Hackman, Dexter)
Featuring reunion of surviving members of the "classic" 1980s lineup. Song originally written for Back For Another Taste (1990).

- Brian Vollmer – lead vocals
- Brent "The Doctor Doerner – guitar
- Daryl Gray – bass
- Greg "Fritz" Hinz – drums

=== Buried tracks ===
- These "buried tracks" are listed in the opposite order on the CD sleeve and liner notes, but actually appear in the order shown below.

11. "Thinking It Over" (2:51) (Del Shannon)
Previously unreleased. Recorded in 1976.

- Brian Vollmer – lead vocals
- Brent "The Doctor Doerner – guitar
- Paul Hackman – guitar
- Keith "Bert" Zurbrigg – bass
- Brian Doerner – drums

12. "Like Taking Candy From a Baby" (3:06) (Doerner, Vollmer)
Previously unreleased. Recorded in 1978.

- Brian Vollmer – lead vocals
- Brent "The Doctor" Doerner – guitar
- Paul Hackman – guitar
- Keith "Bert" Zurbrigg – bass
- Brian Doerner – drums

== Production and credits ==
Compilation concept by Brian Vollmer
Track 1 produced by Ed Stone. Tracks 2, 3 and 10 produced by Dan Brodbeck and Daryl Gray. Track 4, 5, 7 and 9 produced by Dan Brodbeck. Tracks 6 and 8 produced by Daryl Gray. Track 11 produced by Dave Lodge. Track 12 produced by Bob Morton.

=== Helix at the time of release ===
- Brian Vollmer – lead vocals
- Daryl Gray – bass, keyboards, vocals
- Glen "Archie" Gamble – drums
- Gerry Finn – guitars
- Mike Hall – guitars
