= Live! in Buffalo =

Live album by Helix
- Released: 2001
- Recorded: September 29, 1983
- Genre: Hard rock Heavy metal
- Label: Dirty Dog

Helix chronology
B-Sides (1999)	Live! in Buffalo (2001)	Rockin' in My Outer Space (2004)

Live! in Buffalo is a live album by Canadian hard rock/heavy metal band Helix. It was recorded on September 29, 1983 in Buffalo, New York. It is their 14th official release. It includes several songs that were road-tested versions of new tracks that were written for 1984's Walkin' the Razor's Edge, but were yet to be recorded. It also features the song "Hot on the Heels of Love" that has never been released in any other form.

== Track listing ==
1. "No Rest for the Wicked" (3:43)
2. "6 Strings 9 Lives" (3:16)
3. "Let's All Do it Tonight" (4:46)
4. "Never Want To Lose You" (3:23)
5. "Everybody Pays the Price" (3:19)
6. "You Keep Me Rocking" (4:13)
7. "White Lace & Black Leather" (4:20)
8. "Check Out the Love" (3:20)
9. "Hot on the Heels of Love" (3:14)
10. "Heavy Metal Love" (2:59)
11. "Dirty Dog" (3:35)
12. "No High Like Rock and Roll" (6:49)
13. "My Kind of Rock" (3:59)

== Personnel ==
- Brian Vollmer - Lead vocals except on 9
- Greg "Fritz" Hinz - Drums
- Mike Uzelac - Bass
- Paul Hackman - Guitars
- Brent "The Doctor" Doerner - Guitars, lead vocals on 9

== Notes ==
Tracks 2, 6, and 13 were previews for the forthcoming album Walkin' the Razor's Edge. Track 5 was unrecorded and unreleased until 1989's Over 60 minutes with.... Track 9 has never been recorded or released anywhere else.

=== Helix at the time of release ===
- Brian Vollmer - Lead vocals
- Glen "Archie" Gamble - Drums
- Daryl Gray - Bass
- Darren Smith - Guitars
- Mike Hall - Guitars
