= Deep Cuts: The Best Of =

Deep Cuts: the Best Of

Greatest hits album by Helix
- Released: 1999
- Genre: Hard rock, heavy metal
- Label: Razor & Tie, EMI

Helix chronology
half-ALIVE (1998)	Deep Cuts: the Best Of (1999)	B-Sides (1999)

Professional ratings
Review scores
Source	Rating
Allmusic	4/5 stars

Deep Cuts is a compilation album by the Canadian hard rock band Helix. It is their 12th official release, and their third compilation album. It collects music from both their early indi career as well as their catalogue with Capitol Records and rare tracks.

== Track listing ==
All songs written by Brian Vollmer and Paul Hackman except where noted.

1. "Heavy Metal Love"
2. "Don't Get Mad Get Even" (Dal Bello, Thorney)
3. "Rock You" (Bob Halligan Jr.)
4. "When The Hammer Falls"
5. "Gimme Gimme Good Lovin'" (Ritchie Cordell, Joey Levine)
6. "It's Too Late" (Hackman, Dexter) (from the soundtrack to Iron Eagle)
7. "Deep Cuts The Knife" (Halligan, Hackman)
8. "The Kids Are All Shakin'"(Video Mix)
9. "Wild In The Streets" (Ray Lyell, Hackman)
10. "Dream On" (Dan McCafferty, Billy Rankin, Darrell Sweet, Lee Agnew, Manny Charlton, John Locke)
11. "Women, Whiskey & Sin" (Voller, Hackman, Brent Doerner)
12. "Everybody Pays The Price"
13. "Give It To You"
14. "Good To The Last Drop" (Vollmer, Marc Ribler)

== Credits ==
=== Personnel ===
- Brian Vollmer - Vocals
- Greg "Fritz" Hinz - Drums except on 11
- Daryl Gray - Bass except on 1, 2, and 11
- Paul Hackman - Guitars
- Brent "The Doctor" Doerner - Guitars except on 13 and 14
- Mike Uzelec - Bass on 1, 2, and 11
- Leo Niebudek - Drums on 11

=== Production ===
Compilation produced by David Richman and Kevin Flaherty
