= Smash Hits...Unplugged! =

Studio album by Helix
- Released: November 13, 2010 (Canada), January 18 2011 (US)
- Genre: Heavy metal
- Label: EMI
- Producer: Aaron Murray, Sean Kelly and Brian Vollmer

Helix chronology
Vagabond Bones (2009)	Smash Hits...Unplugged! (2010)	Skin in the Game (2011)

Smash Hits...Unplugged! is an acoustic studio album by the heavy metal band Helix. It was released in November 2010 via the band's official site and at shows, with a wider release via EMI in January 2011. It is composed of acoustic versions of Helix hits from albums past as well as a new cover version of "Touch Of Magic" by the late Canadian singer, James Leroy. It is the first studio recording by the current Helix lineup of vocalist Brian Vollmer, guitarists Brent Doerner and Kaleb Duck, bassist Daryl Gray and drummer Greg Hinz. It also features guitar performances by ex-member and co-producer Sean Kelly. It is Helix' 13th full-length studio album and 22nd album released overall.

== Track listing ==
All songs written by Brian Vollmer and Paul Hackman except where noted.

1. "Gimme Gimme Good Lovin'" (Joey Levine, Ritchie Cordell)
2. "Kids Are All Shakin"
3. "Heavy Metal Love"
4. "That Day Is Gonna Come" (Vollmer, Marc Ribler)
5. "Dream On" (Dan McCafferty, Billy Rankin, Darrell Sweet, Lee Agnew, Manny Charlton, John Locke)
6. "Deep Cuts The Knife" (Bob Halligan, Jr., Hackman)
7. "(Make Me Do) Anything You Want" (Paul Naumann, Danny Taylor)
8. "Good To The Last Drop" (Vollmer, Ribler)
9. "Wild In The Streets/No Rest For The Wicked" (Ray Lyell, Hackman/Vollmer)
10. "Touch of Magic" (James Leroy)
11. "Rock You" (Halligan)

== Credits ==
Produced by Aaron Murray, Sean Kelly and Brian Vollmer.

=== Helix ===
- Brian Vollmer – lead vocals
- Brent "The Doctor" Doerner – 6 and 12 string acoustic guitars, mandolin, vocals
- Daryl Gray – bass, 6 and 12 string acoustic guitars, keyboards & string arrangements, percussion, washboard, bodhran, harmonica
- Greg "Fritz" Hinz – drums, percussion
- Kaleb "Duckman" Duck – guitars and vocals

=== Additional musicians ===
- Sean Kelly – guitar, dobro, banjo
- Wendy Wright – fiddle on "Kids Are All Shakin"
- Cheryl Lescom – background vocals on "Kids Are All Shakin"
