= When Pigs Fly (Vollmer album) =

Studio album by Vollmer
- Released: 1999
- Genre: Heavy metal
- Label: Vollmer
- Producer: Dan Brodbeck

Vollmer chronology
It's a Business Doing Pleasure (Helix album) (1993)	When Pigs Fly (1999)	Rockin' in My Outer Space (Helix album) (2004)

When Pigs Fly is a solo album by Brian Vollmer, lead vocalist of the Canadian heavy metal band Helix. It was released in 1999 and features ex-Helix and current Saga/My Wicked Twin drummer Brian Doerner. It was released under the band name Vollmer and is Brian Vollmer's only solo release to date. It was Vollmer's first studio album since Helix's 1993 release It's a Business Doing Pleasure. There would be a five-year gap between When Pigs Fly and Vollmer's next studio release, Helix's Rockin' in My Outer Space from 2004.

== Track listing ==
1. "I'm a Live Frankenstein"
2. "Life of the Party (But Now He's Dead!!)"
3. "King of the Hill"
4. "Stumblin' Blind"
5. "Pissed Off"
6. "X-Ray Eyes"
7. "F.u.g.l.y."
8. "When Pigs Fly"
9. "Good Times Don't Get Better Than This"

Track 1 was later released in remixed and overdubbed form on the Helix CD Never Trust Anyone Over 30.
Tracks 3 and 4 were later released in remixed and overdubbed forms on the Helix CD Rockin' in My Outer Space.
Track 9 was later used as end credit music on the Helix DVD 30 Years of Helix.

=== Vollmer ===
- Brian Vollmer - lead vocals
- Bill Gadd - lead guitar

(Tony Palleschi - bass guitar

- Brian Doerner - drums

=== Additional Musicians ===
Christine Newland - cello on track 4
Mel Martin - violin on track 4

== Production ==
- Executive Producer: Brian Vollmer
- Produced by Dan Brodbeck
- Engineered by Dan Burns
- Recorded at DB Studios, London, Ontario Canada.

== Videos ==
"I'm a Live Frankenstein" was filmed and released as a music video. Ray Lyell directed the video. This video was eventually released for sale on VHS.
