= Over 60 Minutes With... =

Greatest hits album by Helix
- Released: September 8, 1989
- Genre: Hard rock, heavy metal
- Length: 72:12
- Label: Capitol

Helix chronology
| Wild in the Streets (1987) | Over 60 Minutes With... (1989) | Back for Another Taste (1990) |

Professional ratings
Review scores
| Source | Rating |
|---|---|
| AllMusic | 3.5/5 stars |

Over 60 Minutes With... is the seventh album release by Canadian hard rock/heavy metal band Helix. Their first compilation, it collects music from their first three Capitol Records albums but includes nothing from Wild in the Streets (1987). It was released on cassette and CD. Along with past singles and album tracks, the compilation album also includes previously unreleased songs "Everybody Pays the Price" and "Give It To You". Also included is "Jaws of the Tiger", which had first been released in 1986 as the B-side of the "It's Too Late" single.

"Give It to You" was later re-recorded and re-released on Back for Another Taste (1990). "Jaws of the Tiger" was re-recorded and re-released on B-sides (1999). "Everybody Pays the Price" was never re-recorded, but it was re-released as the B-side to the single "The Storm", and also on the Helix compilation Deep Cuts: The Best Of.

== Track list ==
1. "No Rest for the Wicked" - 3:17
2. "Check Out the Love" - 3:06
3. "Dirty Dog" - 3:35
4. "Give It to You" - 4:03
5. "Young & Wreckless" - 3:25
6. "Deep Cuts the Knife" - 4:04
7. "Animal House" - 3:00
8. "You Keep Me Rockin'" -3:43
9. "Never Want to Lose You" - 3:09
10. "Does a Fool Ever Learn" - 3:22
11. "Jaws of the Tiger" - 3;59
12. White Lace and Black Leather
13. Long Way to Heaven
14. Without You (Jasmine's Song)
15. Everybody Pays the Price
16. Heavy Metal Love
17. Gimme Gimme Good Lovin'
18. When the Hammer Falls
19. The Kids Are All Shakin'
20. (Make Me Do) Anything You Want
21. Rock You

== Personnel ==
- Brian Vollmer – lead vocals
- Brent "The Doctor" Doerner – guitars
- Paul Hackman – guitars
- Greg "Fritz" Hinz – drums
- Daryl Gray – bass
- Mike Uzelac – bass on tracks 1, 2, 3, 9, 10, 12, and 16
