= Rock You =

1984 single by Bob Halligan, Jr.

Single by Helix

from the album Walkin' the Razor's Edge
- B-side: "You Keep Me Rockin'"
- Released: 1984
- Recorded: 1984
- Genre: Hard rock; heavy metal; glam metal
- Length: 2:54
- Label: Capitol (CL339)
- Songwriter: Bob Halligan, Jr.
- Producers: Helix and Rodney Mills

Helix singles chronology
"Heavy Metal Love" (1983)	"Rock You" (1984)	"Gimme Gimme Good Lovin'" (1984)

"Rock You" is a hard rock song written by Bob Halligan, Jr., and the first track from Helix's 1984 album Walkin' the Razor's Edge. It is best known for its call and response refrain of "Gimme an R, O, C, K." It peaked at number 27 on the RPM Pop Chart in Canada, although it received much higher levels of play on Canadian rock radio stations, but no national rock track chart exists for Canada for this time period.

== Helix versions ==
Songwriter Bob Halligan offered the band "Rock You" while they were looking for extra material for Walkin' the Razor's Edge in 1984. "Rock You" was road tested in concert, played for the first time at the Alrosa Villa in Columbus, Ohio. Helix vocalist Brian Vollmer claims that he wrote a new verse for the song but was denied a co-writing credit. The track was produced by the band with Rodney Mills, who was brought in due to his earlier mixing work with 38 Special.

A brand new acoustic studio version was recorded and released in 2010 on the band's Smash Hits...Unplugged! CD. This version was produced by Aaron Murray, Sean Kelly and Vollmer.

The chorus of "Rock You" has lent itself to Vollmer's autobiography, Gimme An R!, as well as many Helix T-shirts and merchandise.

=== Labatt's Blue version ===
Prior to the album or the single's release, Helix struck a deal with the Labatt Brewing Company to use the music with new lyrics for a beer commercial. A clip of that version can be heard on the DVD 30 Years Of Helix: No Rest For The Wicked.

=== Music video ===
The music video for "Rock You", filmed in a quarry in Toronto, Ontario, is perhaps best known for the image of guitar player Brent Doerner emerging from the water to play his guitar solo. The video is available on the Helix DVD S.E.X. Rated. The uncensored version of the video was banned from MTV for nudity.

=== Live versions ===
Four live versions of "Rock You" have been officially released by the band. A contemporary live recording was released on the promotional EP Live At The Marquee, and the 2009 Rock Candy reissue of Walkin' the Razor's Edge. A 1991 recording appeared on 1998's half-ALIVE. It was filmed in 2004 for the live DVD 30th Anniversary Concert, and another live version was released on iTunes from the 2005 Sweden Rock Festival.

=== In popular culture ===
On the Canadian television program Trailer Park Boys, "Rock You" was the subject of discussion among the main characters. This was based on the call-and-response chorus of the song, "Gimme an R, O, C, K," where the crowd responds with each letter. You can find the discussion here on Wikiquote. On the DVD of Season 3, there is a deleted scene featuring Brian Vollmer and the Trailer Park Boys, using the "Gimme an R" lyric in another joke. In the spin-off series Trailer Park Boys: The Animated Series, this song is referenced multiple times, and played shortly in the season one finale.

=== Personnel ===
- Brian Vollmer - lead vocals
- Brent "The Doctor" Doerner - guitars, vocals
- Paul Hackman - guitars, vocals
- Daryl Gray - bass guitar, vocals
- Greg "Fritz" Hinz - drums

=== Charts ===
Chart (1984)	Peak position
Canada Top Singles (RPM)	27

== Sum 41 version ==
"Rock You"

Song by Sum 41

from the album FUBAR: The Album
- Released: 2002
- Recorded: Reaction Studios, Toronto, Ontario
- Length: 3:13
- Label: Aquarius
- Songwriter: Bob Halligan, Jr.
- Producer: Greg Nori

Sum 41 covered this Helix song for the soundtrack to the movie FUBAR. The soundtrack featured classic Canadian rock songs covered by current Canadian rock artists.

=== Personnel ===
- Steve Jocz - Vocals
- Jason "Cone" McCaslin - Bass
- Dave "Brownsound" Baksh - Guitar
- Deryck Whibley - Drums

=== Helix/Sum 41 controversy ===
After Sum 41's version of "Rock You" was released, Brian Vollmer and Glen "Archie" Gamble were to meet Sum 41 at a FUBAR promotional event, only to find the Sum 41 members uninterested in meeting or talking to them. Later that day on a television broadcast, Sum 41 stated that Helix were "rock gods" and claimed to be fans. This snubbing caused Vollmer to refer to them as "Scum 41" on occasion.
