= Space Junk (disambiguation) =

Space Junk, or space debris, is defunct artificial objects in space, principally in Earth orbit.

Space Junk may also refer to:

== Songs ==
- "Space Junk", by Devo from Q. Are We Not Men? A: We Are Devo!, 1978
- "Space Junk", by Helix from Rockin' in My Outer Space, 2004
- "Space Junk", by Wolfgang Gartner from Weekend in America, 2011
- "Space Junk (Wang Chung '97)", by Wang Chung from Everybody Wang Chung Tonight: Wang Chung's Greatest Hits, 1997

== Other uses ==
- Space Junk, a 2010 artwork by Marisa Olson
- Space Junk, a 2011 novel by Rory Barnes
- Space Junk, an unfinished video game by Imagitec Design for the Atari Falcon
