= The Early Years (Helix album) =

Compilation album by Helix
- Released: 1991
- Recorded: 1976–1981
- Genre: Heavy metal
- Label: A&M

Helix chronology
Back for Another Taste (1990)	The Early Years (1991)	It's a Business Doing Pleasure (1993)

The Early Years was the ninth Helix album and their second compilation album, issued in 1991. It reissued all the tracks from the band's first two independent albums, Breaking Loose (1979) and White Lace & Black Leather (1981), with new cover art. This was the first ever Compact Disc release of these two albums.

== Track listing ==
All songs written by Brent Doerner, Paul Hackman, and Brian Vollmer, except where noted.

Breaking Loose

1. "I Could Never Leave" (Paul Hackman, Brian Vollmer) - 4:06
2. "Don't Hide Your Love" (Hackman) - 3:18
3. "Down in the City" (Vollmer) - 5:56
4. "Crazy Women" (Brent Doerner) - 3:22
5. "Billy Oxygen" (Brent Doerner) - 4:24
6. "Here I Go Again" (Brent Doerner, Vollmer) - 3:34
7. "You're a Woman Now" (Hackman) - 5:37
8. "Wish I Could Be There" (Hackman) - 6:17

White Lace & Black Leather

1. "Breaking Loose" - 4:13
2. "It's Too Late" - 3:57
3. "Long Distance Heartbreak" - 6:47
4. "Time for a Change" - 3:12
5. "Hangman's Tree" - 3:55
6. "It's What I Wanted" - 3:58
7. "Mainline" - 3:00
8. "Women, Whiskey & Sin" - 3:11
9. "Thoughts That Bleed" (Brent Doerner, Lachlan MacFayden) - 4:30

== Credits ==
- Brian Vollmer – lead vocals (all tracks except 4, 5 & 15)
- Brent Doerner – guitars/vocals (all tracks, lead vocals on 4, 5 & 15)
- Paul Hackman – guitars/vocals (all tracks)
- Keith "Bert" Zurbrigg – bass (tracks 1–8, 10)
- Mike Uzelac – bass (tracks 9, 11–17)
- Brian Doerner – drums (tracks 1–8)
- Leo Niebudek – drums (tracks 9–17)

"You're a Woman Now" garnered Helix airplay in Texas in 1979. Joe Anthony of KISS FM played the track which allowed the band to play there.
