= Old School (Helix album) =

2019 studio album by Helix

- Cover graphics by Brent "The Doctor" Doerner

Studio album by Helix
- Released: June 14, 2019
- Recorded: 1989–2019
- Studio: Dawghause Studios
- Genre: Heavy Metal
- Labels: Helix Records (Canada); Perris Records (US)
- Producer: Daryl Gray

Helix chronology
Icon (2018)	Old School (2019)	Eat Sleep Rock (2020)

Professional ratings
Review scores
Source	Rating
Metal Express Radio	6/10 stars
Metal Rules	5/5 stars

Old School is an album of unreleased material by Canadian rock band Helix, released in June 2019.

== Track listing ==
No.	Title	Writer(s)	Length
1.	"Coming Back With Bigger Gun"	Hackman, Vollmer	3:45
2.	"Whiskey Bent & Hell Bound"	Gray, Hackman, Vollmer	4:02
3.	"If Tears Could Talk"	Gray, Hackman, Vollmer	3:26
4.	"Your Turn to Cry"	Hackman, Vollmer	4:05
5.	"Tie Me Down"	Vanderburgh, Vollmer	4:00
6.	"Closer"	Hackman, Vollmer	3:48
7.	"Games Mother Never Taught You"	Hackman, Vollmer	3:56
8.	"Southern Comfort"	Hackman, Vollmer	3:24
9.	"Hound Dog Howlin' Blues"	Vollmer, Uzelac	5:53
10.	"Cheers"	Halligan, Vollmer	4:54

== Notes ==
- "Games Mother Never Taught You", "Tie Me Down", and "Your Turn to Cry" were recorded in 1989 as demos for "Back for Another Taste", however they were not included on the album. All three songs feature former Lead Guitarist, Paul Hackman on guitar and backing vocals.
- All songs were written from 1981 to 1989 and include compositions by Paul Hackman.
- The song "Cheers" was extracted from an old beat-up master tape.

== Personnel ==
Helix

- Brian Vollmer - lead vocals
- Chris Julke - guitar, backing vocals
- Kaleb "Duckman" Duck - guitar, backing vocals
- Daryl Gray - bass, keyboards, guitar, backing vocals
- Greg "Fritz" Hinz - drums, backing vocals

Additional Musicians

- Paul Hackman - guitar, backing vocals
- Sam Reid - piano

Production

- Producer: Daryl Gray
- Art direction: Scott Waters, Brent "The Doctor" Doerner
