= Bastard of the Blues =

Bastard Of The Blues

Studio album by Helix
- Released: May 5, 2014
- Genres: Hard rock, Blues
- Length: 44:52
- Label: Perris Records
- Producers: Aaron Murray, Sean Kelly and Brian Vollmer

Helix chronology
Skin in the Game (EP) (2011)	Bastard Of The Blues (2014)	Old School (2019)

Professional ratings
Review scores
Source	Rating
BraveWords	7.0/10
MetalKaoz	7/10
MyGlobalMind	5/10

Bastard Of The Blues is the thirteenth studio album by Canadian band Helix, released May 5, 2014.

== Reception ==
Reception of the album has been mostly positive. BraveWords gave it a positive review, stating that "Although Bastard Of The Blues has its faults, Vollmer & Co. continue to crank out new tunes after 40 years." The online magazine My Global Mind gave it a decent review, mentioning that it's "rather flat and lacking much to keep the listener interested. And the songs are somewhat redundant, each having the same basic vibe." Despite being inconsistent and lacking a punch, they did praise vocalist Brian Vollmer's voice as "perfectly suited for this kind of sound", and lead guitarist Brent Doerner's solos were "top-notch."

== Track listing ==
All tracks are written by Brian Vollmer, Sean Kelly.

No.	Title	Length
1.	"Bastard of the Blues"	5:42
2.	"Even Jesus (Wasn't Loved in His Hometown)"	3:52
3.	"Winning Is the Best Revenge"	4:02
4.	"Screamin' at the Moon"	3:50
5.	"Metal at Midnight"	3:05
6.	"Hellbound for a Heartbreak"	3:30
7.	"When All the Love Is Gone"	5:09
8.	"Axe to Grind"	3:12
9.	"Skin in the Game"	4:50
10.	"The Bitch Is a Bullet"	3:11
11.	"Sticks & Stones"	3:35

== Personnel ==
Helix

- Brian Vollmer – vocals
- Daryl Gray – bass
- Greg "Fritz" Hinz – drums
- Chris Julke – guitars
- Kaleb "Duckman" Duck – guitars
