= Dream On (Nazareth song) =

Single by Nazareth

from the album 2XS
- B-side: "You Love Another"
- Released: August 1982 (US); June 1983 (UK)
- Recorded: 1982
- Genre: AOR; glam rock
- Length: 3:26
- Label: A&M; Vertigo
- Songwriters: Billy Rankin; Manny Charlton
- Producer: John Punter

Nazareth singles chronology
"Love Leads to Madness" (1982)	"Dream On" (1983)

"Dream On" is a song recorded by the Scottish rock band Nazareth, and released on the studio album 2XS in 1982, and later as a single in early 1983. Initially written by Billy Rankin and recorded as a demo in 1979, with an additional verse being penned by Manny Charlton in 1982 during the recording of 2XS, "Dream On" became one of their most popular tracks. In 1987 Helix covered this song and it appeared on their album, Wild in the Streets.

== Charts ==
Chart (1982–1983)	Peak position
Austria (Ö3 Austria Top 40)	4
Germany (GfK)	15
Switzerland (Schweizer Hitparade)	2

=== Year-end chart ===
Chart (1983)	Peak position
Swiss Music Charts	17
Media Control Charts (Germany)	79
