= The Power of Rock and Roll =

Studio album by Helix
- Released: (Canada) July 21, 2007 (United Kingdom) August 20, 2007 (United States) September 4, 2007
- Genre: Heavy metal
- Label: EMI (Canada); Sanctuary (UK); Perris (US)
- Producer: Gord Prior

Helix chronology
Get Up! (2006)	The Power of Rock and Roll (2007)	A Heavy Mental Christmas (2009)

Professional ratings
Review scores
Source	Rating
Allmusic	3/5 stars

The Power of Rock and Roll is a CD released by heavy metal band Helix in 2007. It is Helix' 10th full-length studio album and 19th album released overall. It compiled all 7 tracks from their previous independent release, the EP Get Up! and four new songs. It was released by EMI Records on July 21, 2007, in Canada, August 20 by Sanctuary Records in the UK, and September 4 by Perris Records in the United States. This is the band's only album on EMI in Canada and also the last for a major label. The title track was chosen as the theme song for the 2007 Sweden Rock Festival.

== Track listing ==
All songs originally released on Get Up! except where noted

1. Fill Your Head with Rock (new song)
2. Get Up!
3. Nickels and Dimes (new song)
4. The Past Is Back (To Kick Your Ass)
5. Eat My Dust (new song)
6. Baby Likes to Ride
7. Boomerang Lover
8. Cyberspace Girl
9. Living Life Large (new song)
10. The Power of Rock 'n Roll (originally titled "Do You Believe in Rock and Roll?" on Get Up!)
11. Heavy Metal Love (bonus track)

"Heavy Metal Love" was a re-recording originally from No Rest for the Wicked.

All songs written by Gord Prior, Steve Georgakopoulos and Brian Vollmer except "Heavy Metal Love" by Paul Hackman and Brian Vollmer.

== Credits ==
Produced by Gord Prior

Mixed and mastered Dan Brodbeck and Aaron Murray

Engineered by Rainer Wiechmann

Album cover by Spiro Papadatos

Recorded at Mole Studios, London, Ontario, except "Heavy Metal Love" recorded at EMAC Recording Studios, also in London.

=== Helix live band members ===
- Brian Vollmer – lead vocals
- Rick VanDyk – lead guitar
- Jim Lawson – lead guitar
- Brent "Ned" Niemi – drums
- Paul Fonseca – bass guitar

=== CD musicians ===
- Brian Vollmer – vocals
- Steve Georgakopoulos – guitar, background vocals
- Rob MacEachern – drums
- Jeff Fountain – bass, background vocals
- Barry Donaghy, Gord Prior, Doug Weir, Dan Brodbeck – background vocals

== Music videos ==
A video for "Fill Your Head with Rock", directed by John Hockley of www.hawk-design.com, was made consisting of live footage from 2007.
