= My Wicked Twin =

Canadian hard rock band

- Origin: Kitchener, Ontario, Canada
- Genre: Hard rock
- Years active: 2008-present
- Label: indi
- Members: Brent Doerner; Brian Doerner
- Past members: Shane Schedler - Mike Uzelac - Ralph Schumilas - Dan Laurin - Hills Walter
- Website: https://www.youtube.com/user/mywickedtwin

My Wicked Twin are a Canadian hard rock band from Kitchener, Ontario that formed in 2008. They have their genesis in an earlier band called Brent Doerner's Decibel. Revamped as My Wicked Twin, they now consist of Brent Doerner of Helix and his twin brother Brian Doerner (also ex-Helix). Brent and Brian Doerner have been playing music together since the age of 8. My Wicked Twin's first album Decibel Music released 2016 with 9 songs. In 2018 the band released Twin Turbo with 8 songs. New in 2020 the band released 3 Engines with 10 songs.

== History ==
The first lineup of the band under their original name, Brent Doerner's Decibel, came together in 2006. According to Doerner:

I met these other guys, Shane (Schedler, guitar), Chick (Schumilas, guitar) and Dan (Laurin, drums)...I got to their hall, with some beer, and I sat down, and they blasted away for a friggin' hour, just earthquake volume. When they're done, they say, "Well what did you think of the songs?" And I said, "Well I didn't hear any songs, just all this music." The band responded with, "Well we did the hard part. You just have to write the melody and the lyrics!"

The debut CD was self-produced by Brent Doerner at The Bunker studio in Kitchener, Ontario. The band later added bass player and vocalist Hills Walter, with Brian Doerner joining on drums, doing double-duty with Saga.

On October 6, 2007, Brian Doerner suffered a heart attack. He was due to leave for Europe on a Saga tour. His life was saved, and eventually was able to return to drumming. Brian noted if the heart attack had happened a day later when he was leaving with Saga, "If I'd been on the plane, I'd be dead."

In January 2009, the band announced they had changed their name to My Wicked Twin, and announced the current lineup of Brent and Brian Doerner, Shane Schedler, and new addition Mike Uzelac on bass. Uzelac had previously played with the Doerners in Helix. Their debut album as My Wicked Twin, called Decibel Music was released in early 2009 both physically and on iTunes. They had been writing and recording the album for a year. One track from the CD entitled "Get Your Game On" was unsuccessfully submitted to the CBC during their search for a new Hockey Night In Canada theme song.

In February 2009, Helix announced that Brent Doerner had returned to the band, committing to a minimum of one year, and doing double-duty with My Wicked Twin. Both bands have continued to gig simultaneously. Twin Turbo was released in 2019 with 8 songs with guest musicians Justin Faragher on bass, and Peter Beacock on keyboards. Engineered and mixed by James Roycraft. Mastered by Peter Beacock - Grand Mastering.

The band released their third album '3 Engines' in 2020. The Ashtray Sonatas album was released in 2022 with guest musicians Jim McLean - guitars, Kaleb Duck - guitars, Kelly Kereluik - guitars, Peter Beacock on piano - keyboards. Carl August Tidemann contributed as a guest songwriter on 'This Old Dawg'.

== Band members ==
=== Current members ===
- Brent Doerner - lead vocals, guitars (2006–present)
- Brian Doerner - drums, vocals (2007–present)

=== Former members ===
- Hilliard "Hills" Walter - bass, lead & backup vocals (2007)
- Ralph "Chick" Schumilas - guitars (2006–2008)
- Dan Laurin - drums (2006)
- "Uzi" (Mike Uzelac) - bass, vocals (2008)
- Shane Schedler - guitars, lead & backup vocals (2006–2008)

=== Session players ===
- Mike DeBenedictis - first album sessions: bass (2006)
- Kaleb "Duckman" Duck - guest guitar
- Paul Chapman - 3 Engines
- Jim McLean - guitar - 3 Engines
- Rob Kemp - guitar - 3 Engines
- Graham Smith - bass - 3 Engines
- Justin Faragher - bass - Twin Turbo

== Discography ==
- Brent Doerner's Decibel (released under the band name Brent Doerner's Decibel) (2006)
- Decibel Music (2016)
- Twin Turbo (2019)
- 3 Engines (2020)
