= Back for Another Taste =

Studio album by Helix
- Released: 1990
- Recorded: The River Studios, Fort Erie, Ontario, Canada
- Genre: Heavy metal
- Length: 44:25
- Label: Capitol/EMI
- Producers: Tony Bongiovi, Helix and Marc Ribler

Helix chronology
Over 60 Minutes With... (1989)	Back for Another Taste (1990)	The Early Years (1991)

Singles from Back for Another Taste
- 1. "Running Wild In The 21st Century" Released: 1990; 2. "Good To The Last Drop" Released: 1990

Professional ratings
Review scores
Source	Rating
AllMusic	4/5 stars

Back For Another Taste is the seventh Helix studio album and eighth album altogether. It was also their last album of their original Capitol Records contract. In a fall 1987 interview on MuchMusic with Erica Ehm, lead vocalist Brian Vollmer jokingly stated that this album would be titled Blood, Sweat & Beer. One of the album's singles, "Running Wild in the 21st Century", reached #1 on the RPM Cancon chart.

== Track listing ==
1. "The Storm"
2. "Running Wild in the 21st Century"
3. "That's Life"
4. "Breakdown"
5. "Heavy Metal Cowboys"
6. "Back for Another Taste"
7. "Rockin' Rollercoaster"
8. "Midnight Express"
9. "Good to the Last Drop"
10. "Give It to You"
11. "Wheels of Thunder"
- The UK edition of Back for Another Taste contains a bonus track, "Wild in the Streets" from the Wild in the Streets (1987) album. This bonus track appeared at the end of Side 1, or between "Heavy Metal Cowboys" and "Back for Another Taste" as the 6th track on the CD.

== Credits ==
=== Helix ===
- Brian Vollmer – lead vocals
- Paul Hackman – guitars, backing vocals
- Daryl Gray – bass, backing vocals
- Greg "Fritz" Hinz – drums (1–6, 10, 11), backing vocals

=== Additional Musicians ===
- The Doctor (Brent Doerner) – lead (6, 11) and rhythm guitar, backing vocals
- Marc Ribler – lead, rhythm and acoustic guitars, backing vocals (8, 9)
- Brian Doerner – drums (7–9)
- John Adamo – piano (11) and programming
- Sal Andolina – saxophone (2)
- Gord Prior – backing vocals (8)

=== Production ===
- Produced by Tony Bongiovi and Helix
- Recorded at The River Studios - Fort Erie, Ontario, Canada
- Alex Haas, Dave O'Donnell, Gary Solomon, Michael Christopher, Rob Eaton, Steve Boyer, Steve Rinkoff, Tony Bongiovi - mixing at Power Station, New York City

== Singles ==
"The Storm"
"Running Wild in the 21st Century" (awarded "Heavy Metal Video of the Year" in 1990 on MuchMusic)
"Good To The Last Drop" (Cassette single release only: B-side track "S.E.X. Rated" remains unreleased on CD to date in this version, as it is a different recording than that on the Helix B-Sides CD.)

== Charts ==
Chart (1990)	Peak position
Canada Top Albums/CDs (RPM)	82
US Billboard 200	179
