= Skin in the Game (EP) =

EP by Helix
- Released: October 2011
- Genre: Hard rock, heavy metal

Helix chronology
Smash Hits...Unplugged! (2010)	Skin in the Game (2011)	Bastard Of The Blues (2014)

Skin in the Game is an EP release by the Canadian hard rock band Helix released in the fall of 2011. Consisting of four new songs and one cover, it is their 23rd official release, and their 3rd EP. It replaces a previously announced greatest hits CD to be titled Running Wild in the 21st Century. The new tracks recorded for that CD ended up on this release instead.

== Track list ==
1. "The William Tell Overture"
2. "Skin in the Game"
3. "The Bitch is a Bullet"
4. "Angelina"
5. "Champagne Communist"
