= Helix (band) =

Canadian hard rock band

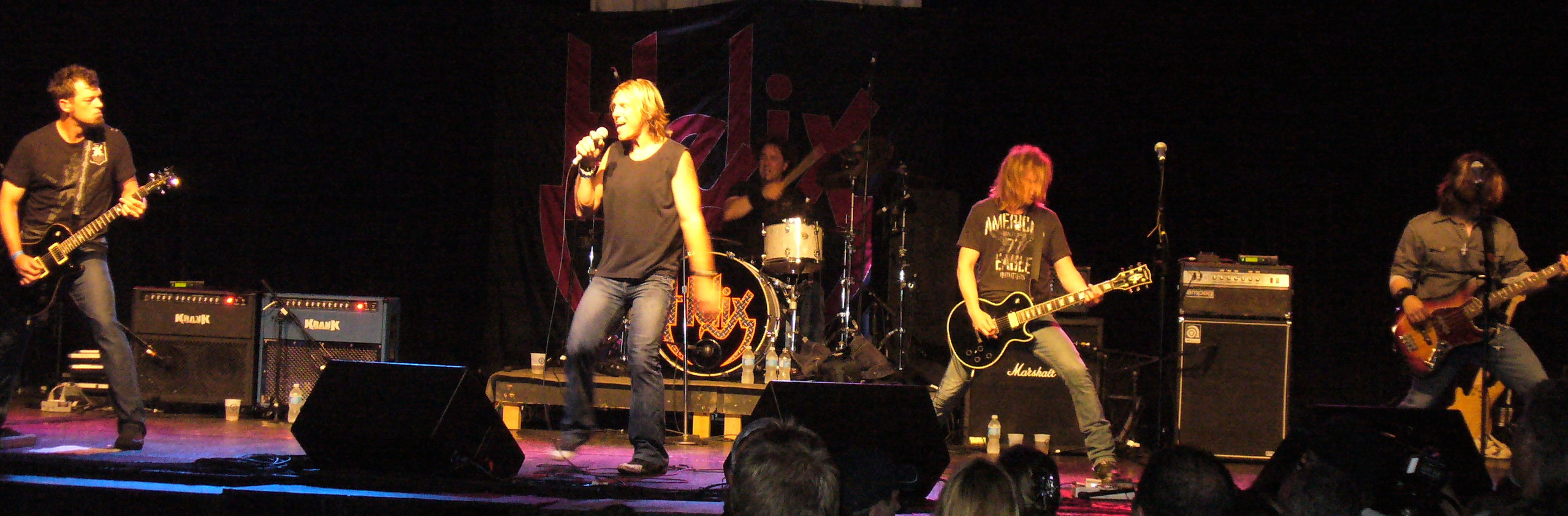
- Helix in concert in 2008

Background information
- Origin: Kitchener, Ontario, Canada
- Genres: Hard rock, heavy metal
- Years active: 1974–present
- Labels: H&S, Aquarius, A&M, Dirty Dog, Capitol, EMI/Sanctuary, Vollmer, DeRock
- Members: Brian Vollmer; Daryl Gray; Chris Julke; Mark Chichkan; Jamie Constant
- Website: www.planethelix.com

Helix is a Canadian hard rock and heavy metal band. They formed in 1974, and are best known for their 1984 single "Rock You".

The history of the band has been marked by many lineup changes, with Brian Vollmer being the sole constant member and only remaining member of the original lineup. The original lineup was formed by drummer Bruce Arnold, and consisted of lead vocalist Brian Vollmer, guitarists Ron Watson and Rick "Minstrel" Trembley, keyboardist Don Simmons, and bassist Keith "Bert" Zurbrigg. However, their most well known lineup, and the one that recorded "Rock You", was the 1980s version of the band: Vollmer on vocals, accompanied by guitarists Brent "The Doctor" Doerner and Paul Hackman, bassist Daryl Gray, and drummer Greg "Fritz" Hinz. Although Hackman was killed in a tour bus accident in 1992, the surviving members of the 1980s lineup reunited in 2009 for an album, and the band has continued to tour since 2011.

Helix have toured with bands such as Kiss, Aerosmith, Rush, Mötley Crüe, Alice Cooper, Whitesnake, Night Ranger, Heart, Quiet Riot, W.A.S.P., Ian Gillan, and Motörhead among others. Their most recent studio album is Scrap Metal (2026).

== History ==
=== Early years: 1974–1982 ===
Helix were formed in 1974 for a battle of the bands contest in Kitchener, Ontario, Canada by drummer Bruce Arnold and lead guitarist Ron Watson. They were originally a six-piece, consisting of Arnold, lead vocalist Brian Vollmer, guitarists Watson and Rick "Minstrel" Trembley, keyboardist Don Simmons, and bassist Keith "Bert" Zurbrigg, who always wore his trademark tuxedo on stage. Their original name was The Helix Field Band, soon shortened to simply Helix. Trembley left after a few months, making the band a five-piece. Soon after, Helix scored some crucial shows as Del Shannon's backing band on some Canadian dates. However, the original lineup dissolved by 1976, and three new members entered the fold. Replacing Simmons, Watson and Arnold were guitarists Brent "The Doctor" Doerner and Paul Hackman, who would both remain with Helix through the 1980s, and drummer Brian Doerner, Brent's twin brother. Brian Doerner only stayed four years, but returned as a member and a guest several times before joining Saga in 2005.

With new management under Kitchener's William Seip, Helix released two independent albums on their own H&S Records, entitled Breaking Loose and White Lace & Black Leather, in 1979 and 1981 respectively. During the sessions for Breaking Loose, Helix recorded a cover of the Del Shannon hit "Thinkin' It Over", unreleased until the 1999 Helix CD B-Sides. Their second album, White Lace & Black Leather, brought more lineup changes with drummer Leo Niebudek taking over for Brian Doerner. Michael J. Fox auditioned to replace bassist Keith Zurbrigg but the job ultimately went to Mike Uzelac. With Zurbrigg gone, Brian Vollmer was now the last remaining original member.

=== Commercial success: 1983–1989 ===
Changing their image from that of a standard bar band to a more image-conscious metal band, Helix finally signed to Capitol Records after being rejected by them three times. In 1983, they released No Rest for the Wicked, with Greg "Fritz" Hinz (ex-Starchild) on drums. This album featured the Canadian hit video "Heavy Metal Love," which featured their new look. Under Seip's advice, Helix dropped their T-shirts and jeans in favour of leather clothing in order to stay current. The tour for this album cycle was not without drama. Mike Uzelac, whose drug use had become problematic, left the band to be replaced by a bass player named Peter Guy from London, Ontario. Guy was unable to travel to the United States due to a previous drug conviction, and Uzelac came back to finish the tour. When Uzelac had fulfilled his commitment, Mark Rector of Kitchener was hired on bass. He was let go at the conclusion of the tour. With the addition of bassist Daryl Gray completing the band's classic 1980s lineup, they released Walkin' the Razor's Edge in 1984. It sold over 100,000 copies in Canada, and over 400,000 internationally. The album included their best known song "Rock You" and a cover of A Foot in Coldwater's "(Make Me Do) Anything You Want".

The band also released a music video for the Crazy Elephant cover "Gimme Gimme Good Lovin'" the same year, creating a parody of the Miss America Pageant titled the "Miss Rock Fantasy" Pageant. Two versions were created: an uncensored version featuring semi-nude and topless women, and a censored version made available for the more mainstream media markets like MTV. The ending of both versions of the video feature comedian Rip Taylor seated on a motorcycle surrounded by the band and the models all waving goodbye. It caused some controversy several years after its initial release when it was learned that among the cast of porn stars that appear topless in the uncensored version was a then-unknown 16-year-old Traci Lords as "Miss Georgia". (This version was also featured in a pornographic video titled Electric Blue 26.)

In 1985, Helix released their fifth album Long Way to Heaven, featuring the singles "Deep Cuts the Knife" and "The Kids Are All Shakin'". The album allowed the band to tour Sweden, becoming the first Canadian rock band to do an extensive Swedish tour. According to Brian Vollmer, the result was a No. 1 album in that country. However, based on the Swedish chart history, the album peaked at No. 14. The following year, their song "It's Too Late" was featured in the movie Iron Eagle and its soundtrack album (this was a completely different song than the track "It's Too Late" that appeared on their second album).

Long Way to Heaven was followed by the release of Wild in the Streets in 1987, featuring the title track and a cover of "Dream On" by Nazareth. One song from that record, "She's Too Tough" was written by Joe Elliot, lead singer for Def Leppard. Leppard also recorded their own version of "She's Too Tough" and released it as a B-side and on their album Retro Active. The recording of Wild in the Streets, done in England with producer Mike Stone, was plagued by extensive takes and remixes. Still, the album went gold in Canada, but only managed a disappointing No. 179 on the Billboard 200 in the United States.

Capitol released the first Helix compilation album Over 60 minutes with... at the end of 1989, which featured new and unreleased material as well as the hits. At the end of the decade, Brent Doerner quit the band, tired of the grind of touring. Helix was left as a four piece.

=== Lineup changes and tragedy: 1990–2003 ===
Helix began the 1990s with Back for Another Taste, which Doerner contributed songwriting and guitar parts to. On tour, Helix brought in their first American member, Denny Balicky. As a touring member, Balicky was not featured in any of their music videos, but he did make significant appearances in the MuchMusic hourlong special Walzing With Helix, which documented Helix's European tour with Sacred Reich and Ian Gillan. Balicky later appeared in the retrospective documentary 30 Years of Helix: No Rest for the Wicked after changing his name to Denny Blake.

After this tour, Vollmer and Hackman began writing songs with the intention of Hackman's material being used for the next Helix release, and Vollmer's going towards a solo album. In the meantime, The Early Years was released by A&M Records, which compiled their first two independent albums on CD for the first time. Helix toured sporadically during this time, including a special reunion show in Kitchener featuring Keith Zurbrigg and the Doerner brothers. A 1992 Western Canadian tour was booked, with Brian Doerner filling in on drums for the unavailable Greg Hinz, and Brent Doerner filling in for Denny Balicki. It was during this tour when disaster struck.

On July 5, 1992, Paul Hackman, not wearing a seatbelt, was killed when the group's van rolled down a 40-foot embankment after a concert in Vancouver. Recovering from the shock of his death, Vollmer regrouped with Brent Doerner once again, and also recruited former Brighton Rock guitarist Greg Fraser. Vollmer took the songs he had recorded for his solo album, and released them as the next Helix record, It's a Business Doing Pleasure (released on Aquarius in 1993, their Capitol contract now finished). He included the song "That Day Is Gonna Come" as a tribute to Hackman, and the video for the song featured unique Super 8 and video footage shot by Vollmer on the road over the years. Brian Doerner played drums on the album. Greg Fraser stated that no then-members of Helix aside from Vollmer himself actually played on the album, since it was in fact a solo album, although they were all pictured and credited in the packaging. However, longtime bassist Daryl Gray did play fretless bass on "Love Is a Crazy Game" and sing background vocals on the rest of the album. Brian Vollmer would later call the album:

...a huge mistake on my part, and I take full credit for the blunder. The really sad thing about it all was that I was really proud of all those songs on the album and they were wasted because they did not fit under the Helix name.

Brent Doerner left the band for the second time after a few shows supporting It's a Business Doing Pleasure. Helix were forced to carry on with a rapid succession of replacement guitar players: Gary Borden (ex-Ray Lyell), Mark Chichkan (ex-Mindstorm), and Rick Mead (ex-Sire), a rotating cast who played at shows when they were available. By 1996, both Greg Fraser and "Fritz" Hinz had departed as well. Brian Vollmer and Daryl Gray carried on with new drummer Glen "Archie" Gamble in 1997, who took on some of their workload such as road managing duties.

In order to keep the new Helix product in stores, five new studio tracks were recorded and released in 1998 on half-ALIVE, produced by Daryl Gray, which compiled these with live tracks from previous tours. Vollmer also released compilations of hits and rare tracks, as well as his first official solo album (When Pigs Fly, 1999) through his website. The band continued to play live through this period, recruiting new guitar players as they were available. At various times, Mike Hall and Gerry Finn, who were both in Killer Dwarfs, joined Helix on the road, as did Darren Smith, the former Harem Scarem drummer, who had switched to guitar. Periodically, the surviving members of the classic 1980s lineup would reform, as they did on the B-Sides CD to record three new songs including "Danger Zone", which were again produced by Daryl Gray. This was a song that Paul Hackman had been working on shortly before his death. At the beginning of the new decade, Helix had to endure another major lineup change. Daryl Gray left the band in 2002 due to an increasingly strained relationship with Vollmer, leaving Brian as the sole member from their 1980s heyday.

With Glen Gamble's help, Vollmer added three new members to bring some stability back to the lineup: Jeff "Stan" Fountain replacing Daryl Gray on bass, Dan Fawcett on guitar, and Shaun Sanders on guitar. All three had played together with Gamble in London's Buffalo Brothers.

=== 30th anniversary ===
In 2004, the 30th anniversary of Helix, the band released several titles to mark the occasion. Their first new studio album of all-original material in over a decade came out, titled Rockin' in My Outer Space. Two compilation CDs were also put together, Never Trust Anyone Over 30 in the US, and Rockin' You For 30 Years in Canada. These albums were marked by a new Helix lineup, and for the first time since 1974, a six-piece: Vollmer, Gamble, Fountain, and new members Jim Lawson (ex-Cherry Smash, guitar), and the husband and wife team of Rainer (guitar) and Cindy Wiechmann (acoustic guitar and vocals). Vollmer first encountered the Wiechmanns in Newfoundland when their band, KAOS, opened for Helix on the Long Way to Heaven tour.

The band played a special 30th anniversary concert at Brantford Ontario's Sanderson Centre. The show featured the current band and past members. Guests included members of the original 1974 Helix lineup (Ron Watson, Bruce Arnold, Keith "Bert" Zurbrigg, and Don Simmons), as well as Brent Doerner, Brian Doerner, Leo Niebudek, and Greg "Fritz" Hinz. The night was released on DVD as the 30th Anniversary Concert. Released at the same time was the documentary DVD 30 Years of Helix: No Rest for the Wicked.

Helix experienced a slight resurgence in popularity at this point thanks to a third-season episode of the television series Trailer Park Boys ("Closer to the Heart"), in which Bubbles and Ricky discuss the merits of Helix compared to Rush. Vollmer also filmed a cameo during that season which was included as a DVD deleted scene. Helix was mentioned in several other episodes; it's revealed that Ricky especially favors attending, and selling marijuana at, their concerts.

In July 2005, Vollmer announced that Helix would be entering the studio to record another new album of original material as well as a cover album. The cover album was intended to be released in spring 2006 and consist entirely of Canadian rock songs. The tentative title was Many Are Cold But Few Are Frozen, but it never materialized.

Finally, Brian Vollmer published his autobiography, Gimme An R, in December 2005. The book covered the numerous lineup changes and ups and downs of Helix through their 30-year career, along with many rare photos.

=== Increased activity: 2005–July 2009 ===
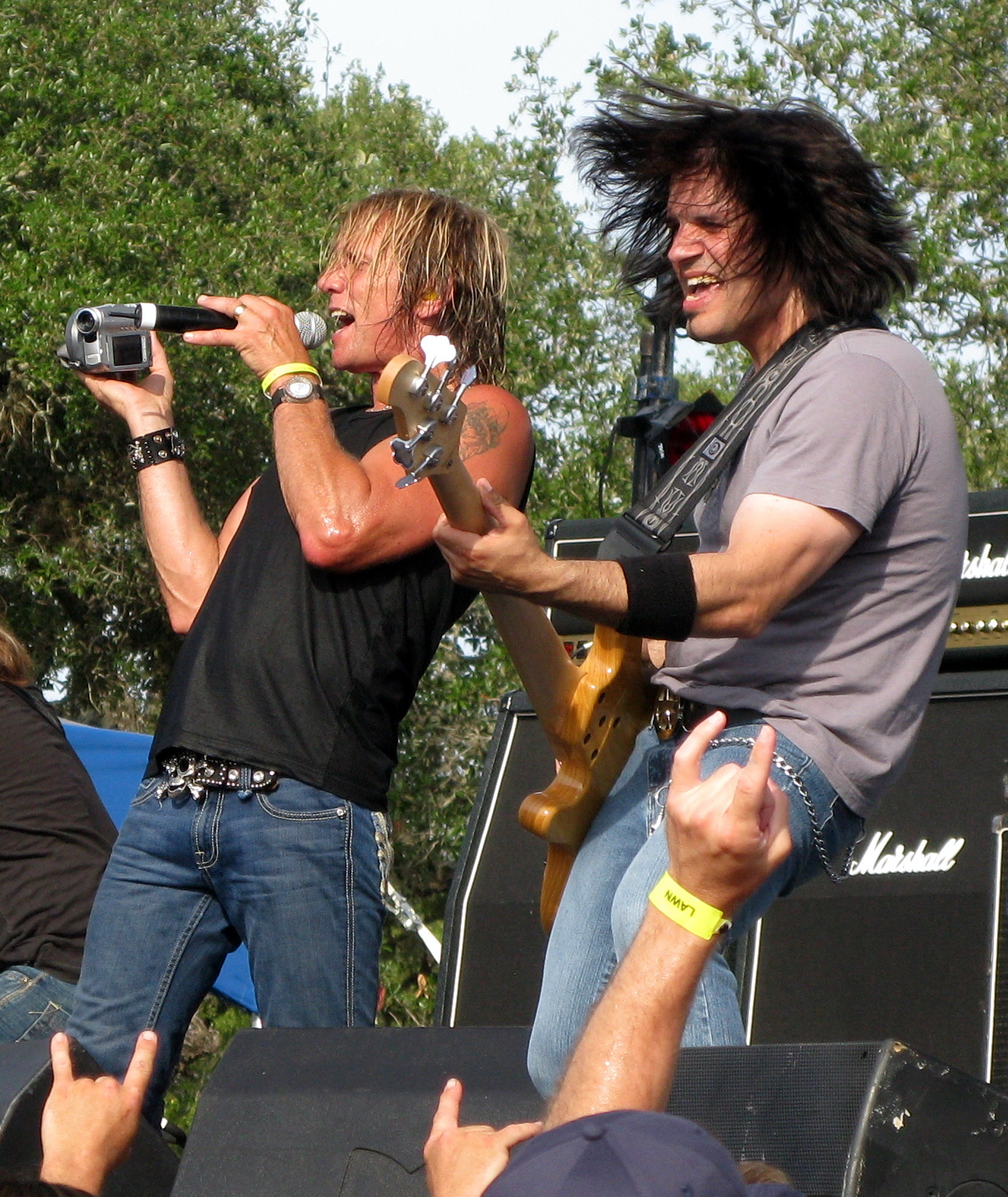
Helix performing in 2008

In late 2005, Glen Gamble left Helix to form his own band, The Joys. Gamble was briefly replaced by a returning Brian Doerner, who stayed with the band for several months. With Gamble gone, Brian Vollmer was left to manage every aspect of the Helix organization, from booking tours, to distributing Helix merchandise.

More lineup changes ensued in 2006: Brian Doerner again departed, this time to play in Saga. He was replaced by Brent "Ned" Niemi, who was a veteran of the Toronto progressive metal band THD that also featured former Slash Puppet vocalist Mif. Helix toured with this new lineup, most notably opening for Alice Cooper in Canada, before Rainer and Cindy Wiechmann left amicably and formed their own band Nail. Rainer was replaced on guitar by Kitchener's Rick VanDyk, formerly of Zero Option who had released an album in the early 1990s. Finally, bassist Jeff Fountain left and was replaced by Paul Fonseca. VanDyk, Fonseca, and Niemi had all played together part-time in a Metallica tribute band called Sandman. With these musicians on board, Helix began augmenting their live setlist with Metallica's "Creeping Death" riff to segue between songs. Recording for a new album began.

In October 2006, the song "Heavy Metal Love" was to be featured on the soundtrack for the Trailer Park Boys movie The Big Dirty, however, at the last minute, the track was pulled by Dean Cameron, president of EMI Canada, as distribution of the soundtrack was being handled by Universal, and not EMI who owns the track. To make up for this, Helix re-recorded "Heavy Metal Love" and included it on their next release, the 2006 EP Get Up!. The original song was still included in the movie even though it did not appear on the soundtrack CD. The Get Up! EP itself was hyped by Vollmer as "...very reminiscent of the No Rest for the Wicked album."

In 2007, Helix re-released all the tracks from Get Up! along with four new studio tracks on a full-length studio album called The Power of Rock and Roll. Unlike the EP, this album received both US and UK releases. In June of that year, Helix played the 2007 Sweden Rock Festival. A new song from The Power of Rock and Roll called "Fill Your Head With Rock" was chosen as the theme song of the festival.

Following this, in October 2008 Helix produced their first Christmas CD. Although Brian Vollmer has recorded Christmas songs before on a charity CD for his church called Raising The Roof on Mary Immaculate, A Heavy Mental Christmas was the first such release from the band.

By late 2008, Helix began working on a new studio album, their 12th, following up A Heavy Mental Christmas. These recording sessions coincided with another new Helix lineup: In February 2009, Brent "The Doctor" Doerner joined the band for the third time. Sean Kelly, singer and lead guitarist of Toronto's Crash Kelly, joined as the new bass player. Brent Niemi was replaced on drums by former Sven Gali member Rob MacEachern, who had actually played drums on Get Up! and The Power of Rock and Roll in Niemi's absence. Jim Lawson remained on guitar, VanDyk having departed to make room for the returning Brent Doerner. Work on the new studio CD progressed with Sean Kelly co-writing and co-producing.

In February 2009, Vollmer reunited the surviving members of the No Rest for the Wicked lineup (Brent Doerner, Mike Uzelac and Greg Hinz) to record a new version of the AC/DC classic "It's a Long Way to the Top", to be included on a compilation album. Concurrent to the new Helix lineup and CD, Brent Doerner formed his own band, My Wicked Twin, featuring Brian Doerner, Mike Uzelac, and Shane Schedler (formerly of Kitchener's Martyrs of Melody). They released their debut CD in January 2009.

=== Current and 1980s band reunion: July 2009–present ===
In an unexpected turn of events, after their July 10, 2009 Rocklahoma performance, Sean Kelly amicably gave notice that he was quitting Helix to be the new guitar player in Nelly Furtado's band. His first date with Furtado was in Mexico City in September 2009. After Kelly's departure, Brian Vollmer reunited the surviving members of the classic 1980s lineup: Daryl Gray, Greg "Fritz" Hinz, and Brent Doerner. At their first rehearsal together, Hinz reported, "…it was like we had never left. We all fell right into the groove." In regards to reuniting the old band, Vollmer cited fatigue of the rotating Helix lineups:

Daryl, Brent and Fritz have all 'been there, done that, got the T-shirt.' So I thought, 'What the hell? Why not just get the original band back together and save myself a big headache?'...We just realized we're better as a unit — and I got sick of working in new people.

Daryl Gray was the first member to play live with the band, appearing August 9, 2009, in Lewisporte, Newfoundland. Jim Lawson's departure was announced on August 30, 2009. According to Vollmer, "Unfortunately, the long distance between where he lives (Sudbury, Ontario) and where the band operates became a factor in Jim staying with us." Orangeville's Kaleb "Duckman" Duck (of BraVurA), who played on Brent's My Wicked Twin CD, was hired on second guitar. Rob MacEachern amicably stepped down for Hinz to return.

The new Helix CD was tentatively titled It's Rock Science, NOT Rocket Science!, before being changed to Vagabond Bones after a song co-written by Kelly. Doerner, Gray and Hinz all appear on the album, along with Sean Kelly, Brent Niemi, Rob MacEachern and Russ "Dwarf" Graham of Moxy and Killer Dwarfs. The songs were described by Vollmer as music "which harkens back to our roots, yet sounds contemporary." A western Canadian tour was played in October 2009.

Brian Vollmer had a cameo appearance in the second Trailer Park Boys movie Countdown to Liquor Day, released September 25, 2009. Helix also performed at the opening gala of the premier of the movie at the Halifax Metro Centre.

The reunion tour has lasted into 2010 including both Canadian and US dates. Brian Vollmer also implied that he would like to continue writing for future Helix albums with former member Sean Kelly. In regards to Kelly's departure in 2009, Vollmer stated, "I give Sean my blessings, no worries. As long as we continue to write together, I am happy."

On August 15, 2010, Vollmer announced the forthcoming release of two new Helix albums. The first, titled Smash Hits...Unplugged! contains acoustic re-recorded versions of Helix hits and a cover of the late Canadian singer James Leroy's "Touch Of Magic". The second album is a compilation called Running Wild in the 21st Century, containing Helix and Vollmer solo material from 1999 to 2010, including two unreleased tracks ("The William Tell Overture" and a new unnamed original song.) It was originally scheduled to be released in October 2010 but was delayed until 2011, due to problems getting permission to include the AC/DC cover "It's a Long Way to the Top". It will be replaced by a new original song instead, causing the delay.

In November 2010, Vollmer announced that the band were filming a pilot episode for a Helix-based reality television series.

In 2012, Helix toured across eight cities in southwestern/southeastern Ontario for a mini Heavy Mental Christmas Tour. Performing classic Christmas songs but with a twist of heavy metal, and they played their hit songs such as "Rock You", "Heavy Metal Love" and their own song "All I Want for Christmas... Is the Leafs to Win the Cup".

Drummer Greg "Fritz" Hinz died of cancer on February 16, 2024, at the age of 68.

On December 5, 2025, the band announced their new album, Scrap Metal, would be released on January 23, 2026.

== Outside Helix ==
Brent and Brian Doerner maintain My Wicked Twin as an ongoing project alongside their main bands, Helix, and Crisis What Crisis, a Supertramp tribute band. Brian Vollmer currently teaches the classical vocal technique, Bel canto, in London, Ontario, as well as singing classical music at weddings and funerals throughout southern Ontario. He has given vocal lessons to Mercedes Lander of the heavy metal band Kittie who also hail from London. His wife Lynda helps with the running of the Helix business from their home, which they have dubbed "Planet Helix". "Planet Helix" was featured in a 2007 episode of MTV Cribs.

== Band members ==
Current

- Brian Vollmer – lead vocals, cowbell (1974–present)
- Daryl Gray – bass, guitar, keyboards, percussion, backing vocals (1984–2002, 2009–present)
- Mark Chichkan – guitar, backing vocals (1993–1999, part-time; 2022–present)
- Chris Julke – guitar (2014–present)
- Jamie Constant - drums (2024–present)

== Discography ==
=== Studio albums ===
- Breaking Loose (1979)
- White Lace & Black Leather (1981)
- No Rest for the Wicked (1983)
- Walkin' the Razor's Edge (1984)
- Long Way to Heaven (1985)
- Wild in the Streets (1987)
- Back for Another Taste (1990)
- It's a Business Doing Pleasure (1993)
- Rockin' in My Outer Space (2004)
- The Power of Rock and Roll (2007)
- A Heavy Mental Christmas (2008)
- Vagabond Bones (2009)
- Bastard of the Blues (2014)
- Old School (2019)
- Eat Sleep Rock (2020)
- Scrap Metal (2026)

=== Live albums ===
- Live at the Marquee (1984) (Promotional live EP)
- half-ALIVE (1998)
- Live! in Buffalo (2001)

=== Compilation albums ===
- Over 60 minutes with... (1989)
- The Early Years (1991) (Reissue of first two albums)
- Deep Cuts: The Best Of (1999)
- B-Sides (1999)
- Never Trust Anyone Over 30 (2004) (US Compilation)
- Rockin' You for 30 Years (2004) (Canadian Compilation)
- Smash Hits...Unplugged! (2010)
- Best of 1983-2012 (2013)
- Rock It Science (2016)
- Icon (2018)

=== EPs ===
- Get Up! (2006)
- Skin in the Game (2011)

=== Unofficial compilation albums ===
- Vixen and Helix: Back 2 Back Hits (2000) (Split compilation CD from EMI Special Products)

=== Singles ===
- (1979) Don't Hide Your Love / You're a Woman Now
- (1979) Billy Oxygen / Crazy Woman
- (1981) It's Too Late / Women Whiskey & Sin
- (1983) Does a Fool Ever Learn / Never Want to Lose You
- (1983) Don't Get Mad Get Even / Check Out the Love
- (1983) Heavy Metal Love / No Rest for the Wicked
- (198?) Everybody Pays The Price / Breaking Loose [German maxi single]
- (1984) Rock You / You Keep Me Rockin' * (1985) (No. 27 CAN)
- (1984) Gimme Gimme Good Lovin' / When the Hammer Falls
- (1984) (Make Me Do) Anything You Want / Feel the Fire* (1985) Deep Cuts The Knife / Bangin' Off-A-The Bricks (No. 40 CAN)
- (1985) Deep Cuts The Knife / Bangin' Off-A-The Bricks (No. 66 CAN)
- (1985) The Kids Are All Shakin' / House On Fire (No. 75 CAN)
- (1986) It's Too Late / Jaws of the Tiger
- (1987) Wild In the Streets / Kiss It Goodbye
- (1987) Dream On / What Ya Bringin' to the Party?
- (1990) The Storm (No. 74 CAN)
- (1990) Running Wild In the 21st Century
- (1990) Good to the Last Drop / S-E-X Rated (No. 27 CAN)
- (1993) That Day Is Gonna Come
- (1998) The Same Room
- (1999) I'm A Live Frankenstein [Brian Vollmer solo]
- (2007) Fill Your Head With Rock
- (2009) Vagabond Bones
- (2009) When the Bitter's Got The Better Of You
- (2009) Monday Morning Meltdown
- (2009) Make 'Em Dance
- (2012) All I Want for Christmas... Is the Leafs to Win the Cup
- (2017) The Devil is Having A Party Tonight / The Tequila Song
- (2022) Not My Circus
- (2025) Brother From A Different Mother
- (2025) Stand Up

=== Music videos ===
- (1983) Don't Get Mad Get Even
- (1983) Heavy Metal Love
- (1984) Rock You
- (1984) Gimme Gimme Good Lovin'
- (1984) (Make Me Do) Anything You Want
- (1985) The Kids Are All Shakin'
- (1985) Deep Cuts the Knife
- (1987) Wild In the Streets
- (1987) Dream On
- (1990) Good To The Last Drop
- (1990) Running Wild In the 21st Century
- (1990) The Storm
- (1993) That Day Is Gonna Come
- (1998) The Same Room [filmed but unreleased]
- (1999) I'm a Live Frankenstein [Brian Vollmer solo]
- (2007) Fill Your Head With Rock
- (2009) Vagabond Bones
- (2009) When the Bitter's Got the Better of You
- (2009) Monday Morning Breakdown
- (2009) Make 'Em Dance
- (2012) All I Want for Christmas... Is the Leafs to Win the Cup
- (2013) Champagne Communist
- (2016) (Gene Simmons Says) Rock is Dead
- (2020) Eat Sleep Rock
- (2020) The Tequila Song

=== DVD and VHS ===
- S.E.X. Rated (DVD 2001, VHS 1991)
- 30th Anniversary Concert (DVD 2004)
- 30 Years of Helix: No Rest for the Wicked (DVD 2004)

=== Non-album tracks and solo albums ===
==== Compilation appearances ====
- Original soundtrack: Iron Eagle (1986) - featuring "It's Too Late", later released on the Helix compilation CD Deep Cuts: The Best Of.
- "S.E.X. Rated" (1990) - B-side on the "Good to the Last Drop" cassette single only. This recording, thus far only released on the cassette B-side, is a completely different recording than the one on the B-Sides CD. According to lead vocalist Brian Vollmer, there are currently no plans to re-release this rare version which, unlike the B-Sides version, includes a performance by late guitarist Paul Hackman.
- Various artists - Got Ya Covered!! (1996) - featuring Helix's cover of "Set Me Free" by Sweet. This was a compilation of independent artists from London, Ontario. The Helix lineup on this song includes only one actual Helix member, Brian Vollmer himself, backed by members of the band S.F.H.
- Various artists - Sweden Rock Festival 2005 (2005) - featuring live version of "Rock You", and the only official recording by the Vollmer/Weichmann/Weichmann/Lawson/Fountain/Brian Doerner lineup.

==== Solo albums ====
- Vollmer - When Pigs Fly (1999) - solo album by Brian Vollmer.
- Raising the Roof on Mary Immaculate (2005) - charity CD featuring Brian Vollmer and Cindy Wiechmann.
- Brent Doerner's Decibel - Brent Doerner's Decibel (2006) - solo album by Brent Doerner.
- My Wicked Twin - Decibel Music (2009) - includes three past/present Helix members in Brent & Brian Doerner, and Mike Uzelac going under the name "Uzi".
