= Rockin' in My Outer Space =

Studio album by Helix
- Released: May 24, 2004
- Genre: Hard rock, heavy metal
- Label: Dirty Dog
- Producer: Rainer Wiechmann

Helix chronology
Live! in Buffalo (2001)	Rockin' in My Outer Space (2004)	Never Trust Anyone Over 30 (2004)

Canadian chronology
Rockin' You For 30 Years (2004)

Rockin' in My Outer Space is a CD released by hard rock/heavy metal band Helix on May 24, 2004. It is Helix' 9th full-length studio album, and 15th official album release. It is also their first studio album since 1993's It's a Business Doing Pleasure, an 11-year gap and the longest gap between studio albums in Helix history.

== History ==
As Helix began preparing to record their first studio album in over a decade, they first had to endure some lineup changes. Guitarist Dan Fawcett was let go, and he was followed by co-guitarist Shaun Sanders. Lead vocalist Brian Vollmer was in the midst of planning a special 30th anniversary concert at Brantford Ontario's Sanderson Centre, but first had to replace two guitar players. Rainer Wiechmann was producing the new album, and his wife Cindy sang backup vocals. Vollmer first encountered the Wiechmanns in Newfoundland when their band, KAOS, opened for Helix on the 1985 Long Way to Heaven tour. Rainer contributed guitar parts to the album and eventually joined the band. Cindy was asked to join at their first rehearsal together. New second guitarist Jim Lawson was known to Vollmer via his old band, Cherry Smash. Cherry Smash and Helix were mutually managed by William Seip previously.

Since 2004 represented the 30th anniversary of Helix, several albums were released to mark the occasion. Rockin' In My Outer Space was followed by two compilations, Never Trust Anyone Over 30 in the US, and Rockin' You For 30 Years in Canada.

== Track listing ==
All songs written by Bill Gadd, Rob Long, Tony Paleschi, and Brian Vollmer except where noted

1. "Space Junk" (1:30) (Rainer Wiechmann)
2. "Rockin' in My Outer Space" (4:22)
3. "It's Hard to Feel the Sunshine When Your Heart Is Filled With Rain" (3:19) (Gadd, Long, Paleschi, Vollmer)
4. "Six Feet Underground" (3:48)
5. "Lint and Pennies" (4:19)
6. "Everybody's Got Their Cross to Bear" (3:05)
7. "Stumblin' Blind" (3:25)
8. "King of the Hill" (3:08)
9. "The Ballad of Sam and Mary" (3:24)
10. "Panic" (3:45)
11. "Sunny Summer Daze" (2:54)

"King of the Hill" and "Stumblin' Blind" are remixed versions originally from the Brian Vollmer's solo album When Pigs Fly.

== Credits ==
Produced by Rainer Wiechmann except "King of the Hill" and "Stumblin' Blind" produced by Dan Brodbeck.
Executive produced by Brian Vollmer.
"King of the Hill" and "Stumblin' Blind" remixed by Rainer Weichmann.

=== Helix live band members ===
- Brian Vollmer - lead vocals
- Jim Lawson - guitar
- Rainer Wiechmann - guitar
- Cindy Wiechmann - acoustic guitar, vocals, keyboards
- Jeff "Stan" Fountain - bass
- Glen "Archie" Gamble - drums

=== CD Musicians ===
- Brian Vollmer - vocals
- Bill Gadd - guitar
- Rainer Wiechmann - guitar
- Tony Paleschi - bass on 3, 5, 7, 9 & 10
- Brian Doerner - drums on 7 & 8
- Brent "The Doctor" Doerner - guitar on 11
- Cindy Wiechmann - backing vocals
- Jeff "Stan" Fountain - bass
- Glen "Archie" Gamble - drums

Recorded at Mole Studios, London, Ontario between 2001 and 2004.
