= White Lace & Black Leather =

Studio album by Helix
- Released: 1981
- Recorded: 1980–1981
- Studio: Springfield Sound (Aylmer, Ontario)
- Genre: Hard rock; heavy metal
- Length: 45:05
- Label: H&S
- Producer: Lachlan MacFadyen

Helix chronology
| Breaking Loose (1979) | White Lace & Black Leather (1981) | No Rest for the Wicked (1983) |

Singles from White Lace & Black Leather
- 1. "It's Too Late" Released: 1981

White Lace & Black Leather is the second studio album by Canadian hard rock band Helix. Recorded at Springfield Sound in Aylmer, Ontario with producer Lachlan MacFadyen, it was released in 1981 on the band's own label H&S Records. The release was the group's first to feature bassist Mike Uzelac and their only to feature drummer Leo Niebudek, the pair of whom replaced Keith "Bert" Zurbrigg (featured on one track, single "It's Too Late") and drummer Brian Doerner, respectively.

Eight of the nine songs on White Lace & Black Leather were co-written by Helix vocalist Brian Vollmer with guitarists Brian Doerner and Paul Hackman, with the remaining track composed by Doerner and producer MacFadyen. As he had done on 1979's Breaking Loose, Doerner performed lead vocals on one track, "Mainline". White Lace & Black Leather was later reissued as part of the 1991 compilation The Early Years, and subsequently remastered for a 2019 reissue with two bonus tracks.

== Background ==
Helix funded the recording of White Lace & Black Leather independently as they had done for their 1979 debut Breaking Loose, with manager Bill Seip raising the money for the sessions. The album was released on the band's own label H&S Records, which stands for "Helix & Seip". Songwriting for the album was much more collaborative than its predecessor, with all but one song written by the team of Brian Vollmer, Brent Doerner and Paul Hackman; the final song on the record, "Thoughts That Bleed", was credited to Doerner and producer Lachlan MacFadyen. According to Vollmer, the album sold around 15,000 copies.

Following its initial pressings on LP record, White Lace & Black Leather was released on compact disc for the first time as the second half of the 1991 compilation The Early Years, alongside Breaking Loose. The album was later remastered and reissued in 2019 alongside the 40th anniversary edition of the 1979 debut, featuring two previously unreleased bonus tracks: "When the Fire Is Hot", one of the tracks submitted to Capitol Records which helped the band get signed after the album's release; and "White Lace & Black Leather", an early version of the song later recorded as the closing track for 1983's No Rest for the Wicked.

== Reception ==
Professional ratings
Review scores
| Source | Rating |
|---|---|
| AllMusic | 3/5 stars |

Music website AllMusic awarded Breaking Loose three out of five stars, although did not publish a written review for the album. Independent writer Mike Ladano gave it four out of five, praising the band's "ambition" experimenting with longer, "more serious" songs. He concluded by stating that "Ultimately there is no question that Helix made the right move to drop some of these softer, more progressive moments and focus on the heavy metal side of their sound. It got them signed to Capitol Records and secured their biggest hits. That leaves these first two albums as evidence of an earlier, more naive Helix willing to stretch out a bit more."

Reviewing the 2019 reissue alongside the 40th anniversary expanded release of Breaking Loose, Ladano praised the albums' mastering and wrote that "These discs are the versions to get; the expanded tracklist making them musts to the collecting fan who already own them all." Regarding the reissue's bonus tracks, Ladano described the Doerner-sung "When the Fire Gets Hot" as "a very unpolished demo, but with a serious stomp and stunning guitar solo".

== Track listing ==
All tracks are written by Brent Doerner, Paul Hackman and Brian Vollmer, except where noted

| No. | Title | Writer(s) | Length |
|---|---|---|---|
| 1. | "Breaking Loose" | | 4:10 |
| 2. | "It's Too Late" | | 3:53 |
| 3. | "Long Distance Heartbreak" | | 6:45 |
| 4. | "Time for a Change" | | 3:08 |
| 5. | "Hangman's Tree" | | 3:52 |
| 6. | "It's What I Wanted" | | 3:57 |
| 7. | "Mainline" | | 2:58 |
| 8. | "Women, Whiskey & Sin" | | 3:06 |
| 9. | "Thoughts That Bleed" | Doerner; Lachlan MacFadyen | 4:31 |
| Total length: | | | 35:21 |

2019 reissue bonus tracks
| No. | Title | Length |
|---|---|---|
| 10. | "When the Fire Is Hot" | 4:17 |
| 11. | "White Lace & Black Leather" | 4:16 |
| Total length: | | 45:05 |

== Personnel ==
Helix

- Brian Vollmer – lead vocals (all but tracks 7 and 10)
- Brent Doerner – guitars, backing and lead (tracks 7 and 10) vocals
- Paul Hackman – guitars, backing vocals
- Mike Uzelac – bass
- Leo Niebudek – drums
- Keith "Bert" Zurbrigg – bass (track 2)

Additional personnel

- Lachlan MacFadyen – production
- Declan O'Doherty – engineering
- Ken Heague – mixing
- Robert Yendt – art direction
- Elba Van Rensburg – design, layout
- D.M. Photography – photography
