= Long Way to Heaven =

Studio album by Helix
- Released: June 6, 1985
- Studio: Phase One (Toronto)
- Genres: Hard rock; heavy metal; glam metal
- Length: 36:25
- Label: Capitol
- Producer: Tom Treumuth

Helix chronology
Walkin' the Razor's Edge (1984)	Long Way to Heaven (1985)	Wild in the Streets (1987)

Singles from Long Way to Heaven
- 1. "Deep Cuts like Knife" Released: 1985; 2. "The Kids Are All Shakin'" Released: 1985; 3. "Ride the Rocket" Released: 1985 (Sweden)

Professional ratings
Review scores
Source	Rating
AllMusic	3/5 stars

Long Way to Heaven is the fifth studio album by the Canadian hard rock/heavy metal band Helix. This album was their third for Capitol Records, and there were bigger expectations from the band after the success of the previous Walkin' the Razor's Edge (featuring the hit "Rock You"). The first single was "Deep Cuts the Knife", co-written by Paul Hackman and Bob Halligan Jr. The song received heavy airplay in the U.S., gaining "double breaker" status, and in Canada was added to heavy video play on MuchMusic. Q107 in Toronto had the song riding at number 1 for several weeks on their "Top Ten at Ten". Their first tour to kick off the album was in Sweden where they became the first Canadian rock band ever to tour that country extensively. For this they achieved their first number 1 album in that country.

Returning to North America, they toured with Accept and Keel, as well as headlining dates. They also played odd one-off dates with Meat Loaf and Heart. While headlining in Newfoundland, a local band called KAOS opened for Helix. This band featured Rainer and Cindy Wiechmann, who joined Helix 19 years later in 2004, on lead guitar and backup vocals respectively.

The second single released from the album was "The Kids Are All Shakin'", a song inspired by a fan letter from Poland. The album went platinum in Canada, and they headlined their first Canadian tour with the Headpins as the supporting act. The Long Way to Heaven album was released for the first time on CD in September 1999.

== Track listing ==
1. "The Kids Are All Shakin'" (Paul Hackman / Brian Vollmer) - 3:48
2. "Deep Cuts the Knife" (Paul Hackman / Bob Halligan Jr.) - 4:01
3. "Ride the Rocket" (Halligan / Brian Vollmer) - 3:24
4. "Long Way to Heaven" (Daryl Gray / Paul Hackman / Brian Vollmer) - 3:34
5. "House on Fire" (Paul Hackman / Brian Vollmer) - 4:15
6. "Christine" (Brent Doerner / Paul Hackman / Brian Vollmer) - 3:34
7. "Without You (Jasmine's Song)" (Brent Doerner / Paul Hackman / Brian Vollmer) - 3:40
8. "School of Hard Knocks" (Brent Doerner / Daryl Gray / Paul Hackman / Brian Vollmer) - 4:06
9. "Don't Touch the Merchandise" (Brent Doerner / Brian Vollmer) - 2:47
10. "Bangin' Off-A-The Bricks" (Brent Doerner / Brian Vollmer) - 3:15

== Video version ==
There was a remix made of "The Kids Are All Shakin'" which was used in the music video. The audio track was not available for purchase until the Helix Deep Cuts compilation of 1999.

== Personnel ==
- Brian Vollmer – lead vocals
- Paul Hackman – guitar, vocals
- Brent “Doctor” Doerner – guitar, vocals
- Daryl Gray – bass, vocals
- Greg "Fritz" Hinz – drums

=== Additional personal ===
- Ken Sinnaeve – additional bass

=== Production ===
- Produced by Tom Treumuth and co-produced by Paul Hackman
- Mixed by David Whittman
- Robert Meecham – technician
- Heather Brown – art direction

== Charts ==
Chart (1985)	Peak position
Canada Top Albums/CDs (RPM)	29
Swedish Albums (Sverigetopplistan)	14
US Billboard 200	109

== Certifications ==
Region	Certification	Certified units/sales
Canada (Music Canada)	Platinum	100,000^{^}
^{^} Shipments figures based on certification alone.
