= It's a Business Doing Pleasure =

Studio album by Helix
- Released: 1993
- Recorded: November 1992
- Genre: Rock
- Length: 41:41
- Label: Aquarius
- Producers: Marc Ribler & Tom Treumuth

Helix chronology
The Early Years (1991)	It's a Business Doing Pleasure (1993)	half-ALIVE (1998)

Brian Vollmer chronology
It's a Business Doing Pleasure (1993)	When Pigs Fly (1999)

Singles from It's a Business Doing Pleasure
- 1. "That Day is Gonna Come" Released: 1993

It's a Business Doing Pleasure was the eighth Helix studio album and tenth album altogether. It was their only release on Aquarius Records. It's A Business Doing Pleasure followed the death of lead guitarist Paul Hackman and the departure of temporary guitarist Denny Balicki. In their stead, guitarist Brent "The Doctor" Doerner returned to Helix after a 4-year absence, and Greg Fraser (ex-Brighton Rock) joined on guitar as well.

== History ==
When writing for the album commenced, Brian Vollmer was also working on a solo album. His plan was that Paul Hackman would write songs for the next Helix record while his songs would be used towards his solo album. Paul's death derailed those plans, and he had no material finished for the Helix album. By this time, Vollmer had almost finished recording his solo album, and decided to release the recordings as the next Helix album. As such, no Helix members actually appeared on the album. Brian Vollmer would later call the album, "a huge mistake on my part, and I take full credit for the blunder. The really sad thing about it all was that I was really proud of all those songs on the album and they were wasted because they did not fit under the Helix name."

Brent Doerner left Helix during the tour for It's A Business Doing Pleasure, and Greg Fraser shortly after him. After their departures, Helix used three different guitarists live: Mark Chichkan, Gary Borden and Rick Mead. Drummer Greg Hinz would leave before the next Helix album as well, and he would be replaced by Glen "Archie" Gamble.

The first official Brian Vollmer solo album would come with 1999's When Pigs Fly, credited under the band name Vollmer.

== Track listing ==
All tracks are written by Brian Vollmer and Marc Ribler, except where noted.

It's a Business Doing Pleasure
No.	Title	Length
1.	"That Day Is Gonna Come"	5:15
2.	"Tug o' War"	3:40
3.	"Wrong Side of Bed"	4:14
4.	"Can't Even Afford to Die"	4:05
5.	"Misery Loves Company"	3:52
6.	"Look Me Straight in the Heart"	4:05
7.	"Trust the Feeling"	5:08
8.	"Love Is a Crazy Game" (Paul Hackman, Ray Lyell, Steve Marinaccio, Ribler)	4:18
9.	"Sleepin' in the Dog House Again" (Ribler)	3:29
10.	"Mad Mad World"	3:26

== Credits ==
Produced by Marc Ribler & Tom Treumuth
Recorded at Hypnotic Studios, Toronto, November 1992

=== Helix ===
- Brian Vollmer – lead vocals
- Brent "The Doctor" Doerner – lead, rhythm & acoustic guitars, background vocals
- Greg Fraser – lead, rhythm & acoustic guitars
- Greg "Fritz" Hinz – percussion
- Daryl Gray – bass guitars, keyboards, background vocals

=== Musicians ===
- Marc Ribler – guitar and background vocals
- Rob Laidlaw – bass
- Brian Doerner – drums

=== Guests ===
- Lee Aaron – lead vocal, track 6
- Kim Mitchell – lead guitar, track 9
- Paula Hanke, Jaymz Bee, Molly Johnson, Paula Tessaro, Anthony Vandenburg, Doug Varty – background vocals

=== Credits Controversy ===
Greg Fraser stated that no then-members aside from Brian Vollmer actually play on the CD even though they are pictured in the packaging and listed as members of Helix. Co-writer and co-producer Marc Ribler played all the guitar parts. Former Helix and current Saga drummer Brian Doerner played on the entire album and Greg Hinz is listed only as "percussion". This is because It's A Business Doing Pleasure was originally recorded as a Brian Vollmer solo album.

== Reception ==
Professional ratings
Review scores
Source	Rating
AllMusic	3/5 stars

It's a Business Doing Pleasure received mixed reviews. Author Martin Popoff called the album "richly produced" and said it "can't be faulted for its gravity and courage to remake the band." He then criticized the album for its "traditional light hard rock; guitar, bass and drums wrapped around simple general and generic rock structures."

== Singles ==
"That Day Is Gonna Come" is a tribute to Paul Hackman, and the video for the song featured unique Super 8 and video footage shot by Brian Vollmer on the road over the years.
