= Half-Alive =

half-ALIVE!

Live album by Helix
- Released: 1998
- Genre: Hard rock, heavy metal
- Label: DeROCK
- Producer: Daryl Gray

Helix chronology
It's a Business Doing Pleasure (1993)	half-ALIVE! (1998)	Deep Cuts: The Best Of (1999)

Professional ratings
Review scores
Source	Rating
AllMusic	3.5/5 stars

half-ALIVE was the first official live album by Canadian heavy metal band Helix, following the promotional-only Live At The Marquee. It was also their 11th album altogether and featured five new studio songs. It was their only release on DeROCK Records and was recorded at various gigs throughout the 1990s.

== History ==
half-ALIVE features varying lineups of Helix, as the band's membership was in a state of flux following the death of guitarist Paul Hackman and the tour for It's a Business Doing Pleasure. In 1997, original member Brian Vollmer and longtime bassist Daryl Gray had to decide whether to keep the band going or to break up. Choosing to stay together, a new release was required or, according to Vollmer, "the live dates were sure to slowly dry up. We had several tracks which were never recorded plus a live album still in the cans, so we decided on putting out a CD which would contain some unreleased tracks and the rest live material." The studio songs included one written but never recorded by bass player Mike Uzelac who was in Helix from 1980 to 1983.

== Track listing and musician credits ==
=== Studio songs ===
1. "Shock City Psycho Rock" (Mike Uzelac)

- Brian Vollmer - lead vocals
- Daryl Gray - bass, vocals, keyboards, percussion, talk box, kazoo
- Greg "Fritz" Hinz - drums
- Gary Borden - rhythm guitars
- Mark Chichkan - lead and slide guitars, vocals
- Tim Louis - honky tonk piano
- Jenifer St. John - piano and keyboards

2. "Wrecking Ball" (Mark Chichkan, Brian Vollmer, Daryl Gray, Gary Borden, Greg Hinz)

- Brian Vollmer - lead vocals
- Daryl Gray - bass, vocals, piano, percussion
- Greg "Fritz" Hinz - drums & cowbell
- Gary Borden - rhythm guitars
- Mark Chichkan - lead guitars, vocals

3. "The Pusher" (Hoyt Axton)

- Brian Vollmer - lead vocals
- Dary Gray - bass, keyboards, percussion
- Greg "Fritz" Hinz - drums
- Gary Borden - rhythm guitars
- Brent "The Doctor" Doerner - guitar and solos

4. "Big Bang Boom" (Vollmer, Marc Ribler)

- Brian Vollmer - lead vocals
- Daryl Gray - bass, percussion
- Greg "Fritz" Hinz - drums
- Paul Hackman - guitars
- Brent "The Doctor" Doerner - guitars

5. "The Same Room" (Bushey, Chip Gall, Huff, Weir)

- Brian Vollmer - lead vocals
- Dary Gray - acoustic guitar, keyboards, percussion, vocals
- Jamie Constant - drums
- Rick Mead - guitars
- Chip Gall - guitars
- Doug Ennis - cello

=== Live songs ===
6. "No Rest for the Wicked" (Vollmer)
7. "Dirty Dog" (Vollmer, Brent Doerner)
8. "Runnin' Wild in the 21st Century" (Vollmer, Hackman)

- Brian Vollmer - lead vocals
- Daryl Gray - bass, vocals
- Greg "Fritz" Hinz - drums
- Gary Borden - guitar, vocals
- Mark Chichkan - lead guitar, vocals

9. "Animal House" (Vollmer, Hackman)

- Brian Vollmer - lead vocals
- Daryl Gray - bass, vocals
- Greg "Fritz" Hinz - drums
- Paul Hackman - guitar, vocals
- Denny Balicki - guitar, vocals

10. "When the Hammer Falls" (Vollmer, Hackman)

- Brian Vollmer - lead vocals
- Daryl Gray - bass, vocals
- Greg "Fritz" Hinz - drums
- Gary Borden - guitar, vocals
- Mark Chichkan - lead guitar, vocals

11. "Deep Cuts the Knife" (Bob Halligan, Jr., Hackman)

- Brian Vollmer - lead vocals
- Daryl Gray - bass, keyboards, vocals
- Glen "Archie" Gamble - drums
- Gary Borden - lead guitars
- Rick Mead - guitars

12. "Smile" (Borden)

- Gary Borden - acoustic guitar

13. "Good to the Last Drop" (Vollmer, Ribler)

- Brian Vollmer - lead vocals
- Daryl Gray - bass, vocals
- Greg "Fritz" Hinz - drums
- Gary Borden - guitar, vocals
- Mark Chichkan - lead guitar, vocals

14. "Heavy Metal Love" (Vollmer, Hackman)

- Brian Vollmer - lead vocals
- Daryl Gray - bass, keyboards, vocals
- Glen "Archie" Gamble - drums
- Gary Borden - lead guitars
- Rick Mead - guitars

15. "Wild in the Streets" (Hackman, Ray Lyell)
16. "Rock You" (Halligan)

- Brian Vollmer - lead vocals
- Daryl Gray - bass, vocals
- Greg "Fritz" Hinz - drums
- Paul Hackman - guitar, vocals
- Denny Balicki - guitar, vocals

== Credits ==
Produced by Daryl Gray
Mixed by Dan Brodbeck at DB Record Studios, London, Ontario

=== Helix at the time of release ===
- Brian Vollmer - lead vocals
- Daryl Gray - bass, keyboards, vocals
- Glen "Archie" Gamble - drums
- Gary Borden - guitars
- Rick Mead - guitars
- Mark Chichkan - guitars

== Videos ==
"The Same Room" was filmed for a never-released video.
