= Walkin' the Razor's Edge =

Studio album by Helix
- Released: July 1984
- Studios: Phase One Studios, Toronto; Electric Lady, New York City; Studio One, Atlanta
- Genres: Hard rock; heavy metal; glam metal
- Length: 33:01
- Label: Capitol
- Producers: Tom Treumuth, Helix and Rodney Mills

Helix chronology
No Rest for the Wicked (1983)	Walkin' the Razor's Edge (1984)	Long Way to Heaven (1985)

Singles from Walkin' the Razor's Edge
- 1. "Rock You" Released: 1984; 2. "Gimme Gimme Good Lovin'" Released: 1984; 3. "(Make Me Do) Anything You Want" Released: 1984

Professional ratings
Review scores
Source	Rating
AllMusic	3.5/5 stars

Walkin' the Razor's Edge is the fourth studio album by the Canadian heavy metal band Helix. It was released on the Capitol Records label in 1984, reaching No. 27 on the Canadian RPM Album Chart, and selling 100,000 copies in Canada and 400,000 internationally.

The video for its lead single, "Rock You", which was filmed in a quarry in Kitchener, Ontario, is perhaps best known for the image of guitar player Brent Doerner emerging from the water to play his guitar solo. "Rock You" reached number 27 on the Canadian RMP Pop Singles Chart, although it was more popular on Canadian rock radio stations. The second single was the Crazy Elephant cover "Gimme Gimme Good Lovin'". Two versions of its music video were filmed: One for music video channels, and the other being an "adult" version featuring topless models including a then 16-year-old porn star Traci Lords. This version was aired on the Playboy Channel in the United States. The band also made a promotional video for their A Foot in Coldwater cover, "(Make Me Do) Anything You Want", with the song reaching number 44 on the Canadian RPM Pop Chart.

== Track listing ==
All tracks are written by Helix except where noted.

Side one
No.	Title	Writer(s)	Length
1.	"Rock You"	Bob Halligan Jr.	2:51
2.	"Young & Wreckless"		3:22
3.	"Animal House"		2:57
4.	"Feel the Fire"		3:13
5.	"When the Hammer Falls"		3:02

Side two
No.	Title	Writer(s)	Length
6.	"Gimme Gimme Good Lovin'" (Crazy Elephant cover)	Joey Levine, Ritchie Cordell	3:25
7.	"My Kind of Rock"		2:54
8.	"(Make Me Do) Anything You Want" (A Foot in Coldwater cover)	Paul Naumann, Danny Taylor	4:07
9.	"Six Strings, Nine Lives"		3:14
10.	"You Keep Me Rockin'"		3:38

2009 UK Rock Candy Records edition bonus tracks
No.	Title	Writer(s)	Length
11.	"Young & Wreckless" (live, taken from Live at the Marquee promotional-only EP)		3:25
12.	"Rock You" (live, taken from Live at the Marquee promotional-only EP)	Halligan Jr.	4:14
13.	"Animal House" (live, taken from Live at the Marquee promotional-only EP)		3:32

== Personnel ==
Band members

- Brian Vollmer – lead vocals
- Brent "The Doctor" Doerner – guitars, backing vocals
- Paul Hackman – guitars, backing vocals
- Daryl Gray – bass, backing vocals
- Greg "Fritz" Hinz – drums

Additional musicians

- Spider Sinnaeve – additional bass

Production

- Produced by Tom Treumuth for Hypnotic Productions, except "Rock You" and "Young & Wreckless", co-produced by Helix and Rodney Mills
- Bonus tracks produced by Simon Hanhart
- Recorded & Engineered by Dave Wittman
- Recorded at Phase One Studios (Toronto), Electric Lady (New York City), Studio One (Atlanta)
- Rodney Mills – mixing
- Gregory M. Quesnel – mixing assistant
- Originally Mastered by Bob Ludwig
- Remastered by Jon Astley (2009 Rock Candy version)
- Heather Brown, Robert Meecham – art direction

== Charts ==
Chart (1984)	Peak position
Canada Top Albums/CDs (RPM)	27
Swedish Albums (Sverigetopplistan)	26
US Billboard 200	69

== Certifications ==
Region	Certification	Certified units/sales
Canada (Music Canada)	Platinum	100,000^{^}
^{^} Shipments figures based on certification alone.
