= Ray Lyell =

Canadian singer, songwriter, and vocal coach

Ray Lyell (born 1962 in Hamilton, Ontario) is a Canadian singer, songwriter, and vocal coach.

== Career ==
Ray Lyell came to prominence with his band, the Storm, in the late 1980s. Ray Lyell and the Storm released their self-titled debut album in 1989. Its first single, "Another Man's Gun", scored No. 6 on the AOR charts. The second single released by Lyell, "Carry Me", was a top 40 hit on the CHR charts and still gets airplay in Canada. Lyell was nominated for a Juno Award as Most Promising Male Vocalist, in 1989. Shortly after the nomination, he began an international tour in Australia.

In 1992, Lyell sold the rights to the name "the Storm" after a legal conflict in the United States. Desert Winds, his next album, was released under his own name, even though the members of the band continued to tour and perform with him. "Gypsy Wind" was the album's first successful single. In 1994, Ray Lyell travelled to Nashville, Tennessee, to begin working on his third album, Working Man, with writers, Billy Crain and Todd Cerney. Working Man was released in 1995. A decade later, Lyell released his fourth album, Running on Faith, with CMC Canada.

Ray Lyell also performs and preaches at various ministries across the Niagara Region.

== Vocal coach ==
In 1996, Lyell developed the Dynamic System of Vocal Teaching. His experience as a performer, with thousands of shows, meshed with his ability to coach singers toward better and healthier vocal performances.

In an effort to expand his own knowledge, Lyell has studied with some of the most prominent vocal coaches in North America. He continues to teach, write and record out of his studio, Rayne Records, in Hamilton, Ontario, Canada.

== Songwriter ==
In 1987, radio station HTZ-FM sponsored a songwriting contest. Ray Lyell won first place with his song, "Take This Heart".

Later that year, he co-wrote, with Paul Hackman of the band Helix, the title track to their album, Wild In The Streets. The success of Wild In The Streets earned Lyell a gold album. He also co-wrote tracks on half-ALIVE and It's a Business Doing Pleasure with Hackman.

Lyell wrote all of the songs from his four albums, with an occasional collaboration with other writers such as Billy Crain.

== Discography ==
=== Albums ===
Title	Album details	Peak chart positions
Title	Album details	AUS
Ray Lyell & the Storm (as Ray Lyell and the Storm)	Released: 1989; Format: LP, CD, cassette; Label: Festival (D30261)	44
Desert Winds	Released: 1992; Format: CD, cassette; Label: Festival (D30892)	—
Working Man	Released: 1995; Format: CD, cassette; Label: Magada International (MAGCD-33)	—
Running On Faith	Released: 2005; Format: CD, cassette; Label: Ray Lyell	—

=== Singles ===
List of singles, with Australian chart positions
Title	Year	Peak chart position	Album
Title	Year	AUS	Album
"Carry Me" (as Ray Lyell and the Storm)	1989	117	Ray Lyell and the Storm
"Another Man's Gun" (as Ray Lyell And The Storm)	1989	—	Ray Lyell and the Storm
"(Running From) Another Man's Gun" / "Colour of Money" (as Ray Lyell and the Storm)	1990	57	Ray Lyell and the Storm
"Cruel Life" (as Ray Lyell and the Storm)	1990	—	Ray Lyell and the Storm
"Gypsy Wind"	1992	—	Desert Winds
"Desert Nights"	1993	—	Desert Winds
"Don't Let Go"	1993	—	Desert Winds
"Bitter Creek"	1993	—	Desert Winds
"Wrong Kind of Love"	1995	—	Working Man
