= Wild in the Streets (Helix album) =

Studio album by Helix
- Released: June 1987
- Studios: The Manor, Oxfordshire, England Phase One Studios Toronto, Ontario, Canada
- Genres: Heavy metal; hard rock
- Length: 39:24
- Label: Capitol
- Producers: Mike Stone, Neil Kernon

Helix chronology
Long Way to Heaven (1985)	Wild in the Streets (1987)	Over 60 Minutes With... (1989)

Singles from Wild in the Streets
- 1. "Wild in the Streets" Released: 1989; 2. "Dream On" Released: 1989

Professional ratings
Review scores
Source	Rating
Allmusic	3/5 stars
Crash	3/6

Wild in the Streets is the sixth album by the rock band Helix, released in 1987.

The album went gold in the band's native Canada, but only managed #179 on the Billboard 200 in the United States. The band would lose their U.S. deal with Capitol Records soon after.

The power ballad "Dream On" is a cover of a 1982 song by Nazareth. "She's Too Tough" was written in 1985 by Def Leppard vocalist Joe Elliott. Def Leppard's version of the song was intended at one time to be on their Hysteria album, but it was wasn't released until 1992 when it appeared on as a bonus track on some editions of their Adrenalize album, and the following year on their 1993 Retro Active album.

The original Canadian cassette issue of this album came in a glow-in-the-dark cassette shell.

== Track listing ==
1. "Wild in the Streets" (Paul Hackman / Ray Lyell) –3:42
2. "Never Gonna Stop the Rock" (Chris Overland / Steve Overland) – 4:36
3. "Dream On" (Billy Rankin / Manny Charlton) – 3:43
4. "What Ya Bringin' to the Party" (Paul Hackman / Ray Lyell) – 4:02
5. "High Voltage Kicks" (Paul Hackman / Brian Vollmer) – 4:19
6. "Give 'Em Hell" (Paul Hackman / Brian Vollmer) – 3:36
7. "Shot Full of Love" (Brian Vollmer) – 4:27
8. "Love Hungry Eyes" (Paul Hackman / Brian Vollmer) – 4:00
9. "She's Too Tough" (Joe Elliott) – 3:29
10. "Kiss It Goodbye" (Brian Vollmer) – 3:27

== Personal ==
=== Band members ===
- Brian Vollmer – lead vocals
- Brent "Doctor" Doerner – guitars, backing vocals
- Paul Hackman – guitars, backing vocals
- Daryl Gray – bass, keyboards, piano, backing vocals
- Greg "Fritz" Hinz – drums, backing vocals

=== Additional personal ===
- Don Airey, Sam Reid – additional keyboards
- Mickey Curry, Brian Doerner, Matthew Frenette – additional drums

=== Production ===
- Produced at Metalworks Studios, Toronto, Ontario, Canada
- Mike Stone – produced Engineer, mixing at Town House, London, England
- Neil Kernon – Producer (tracks 1, 6)
- Lorraine Francis, Nick Blundell, Bill Kennedy – assistant engineers
- Ken Heague – tour manager
- Eric Gillespie, Jacqueline Barlow, Shelley Taylor, Sue Bradford, Tim O'Donnell, Neil Warnock, Vinny Cinquemani, Bill Elson and William Seip – management

== Singles ==
- Wild in the Streets
- Dream On

== Charts ==
Chart (1987)	Peak position
Canada Top Albums/CDs (RPM)	27
US Billboard 200	179

== Certifications ==
Region	Certification	Certified units/sales
Canada (Music Canada)	Gold	50,000^{^}
^{^} Shipments figures based on certification alone.
