= Glen "Archie" Gamble =

- Born: August 3, 1968 (age 57); Wallaceburg, Ontario, Canada
- Origin: London, Ontario, Canada
- Genres: Hard rock, heavy metal
- Occupation: Musician
- Instruments: Drums, percussion
- Years active: 1987-present
- Label: Capitol

Glen "Archie" Gamble is a drummer from London, Ontario, Canada and is best known for his tenure in Helix. He has played with some classic rock bands, both as a side-man and in an opening capacity: Kiss, Alice Cooper, Vince Neil, Paul Rodgers, Robert Plant, as well as some younger bands: Sum 41, KAOS, The Trews, Finger 11 and more.

== Career ==
As a member of Helix (1997–2004), Gamble was able to play on a few EMI/Capitol Records releases, as well as a live concert DVD put out by EMI International. In 1997, he joined the band on drums, adding some stability and taking on some of singer Brian Vollmer's workload such as road managing duties.

Prior to this, Gamble was in a band called Buffalo Brothers on Attic/Universal Music, almost cracking the Canadian Top 40 at #41. He played in the Buffalo Brothers with future Helix alumni Jeff "Stan" Fountain on bass, Dan Fawcett on guitar, and Shaun Sanders on guitar. In late 2004, he left Helix to drum for The Joys who had a Gold single in Canada. Gamble was replaced in Helix by Brian Doerner.

The Joys (formerly Popjoy) were signed to Koch Records Canada. On July 11, 2008 The Joys released the album Unfold nationally. Gamble left the band in July 2008. Presently, Gamble does session and side-man work, along with being the leader of the cruise ship band GAMBLE. He endorses Dixon Drums, Sabian Cymbals, Remo Heads, Cool Claws, Headhunters Drumsticks and KickPort.

== Discography ==
=== Buffalo Brothers ===
- Magic Incinerator (1996)

=== Helix ===
- half-ALIVE (1998)
- Rockin' in My Outer Space (2004)
- Never Trust Anyone Over 30 (2004) (best of)
- Rockin' You for 30 Years (2004) (best of)

=== The Joys ===
- Unfold (2008)

== Videos ==
=== Helix ===
- 30th Anniversary Concert (DVD 2004)
- 30 Years Of Helix: No Rest For The Wicked (DVD 2004)
