= Gimme Gimme Good Lovin' =

Single by Crazy Elephant

from the album Crazy Elephant
- B-side: "Dark Part of My Mind"
- Released: January 1969 (Original US release); February 1969 (Second US release); April 1969 (UK)
- Genre: Garage rock; bubblegum pop
- Length: 2:00
- Label: Bell
- Songwriters: Joey Levine, Ritchie Cordell
- Producers: Joey Levine, Artie Resnick

Crazy Elephant singles chronology
"Gimme Gimme Good Lovin'" (1969)	"Gimme Gimme Good Lovin'" (1969)	"Sunshine, Red Wine" (1969)

"Gimme Gimme Good Lovin'" is a song written by Joey Levine and Ritchie Cordell and performed by Crazy Elephant. It reached No. 12 on both the Billboard Hot 100 and the UK Singles Chart in 1969, and was featured on their 1969 album, Crazy Elephant.

The single was first released in January 1969, with "Hips and Lips" as the B-side, but it did not become a hit until re-released in February 1969.

It was produced by Joey Levine and Artie Resnick and arranged by Levine.

The single ranked No. 89 on the Billboard Year-End Hot 100 singles of 1969.

== Chart history ==
=== Weekly charts ===
Chart (1969)	Peak position
Australia (Go-Set)	22
Canada RPM Top Singles	3
Ireland (IRMA)	19
South Africa (Springbok)	3
UK Singles (OCC)	12
U.S. Billboard Hot 100	12
U.S. Cash Box Top 100	6

=== Year-end charts ===
Chart (1969)	Rank
Canada	92
U.S. Billboard Hot 100	89
U.S. Cash Box	95

== Other versions ==
- In 1969 (the same year as Crazy Elephant's release) Don Fardon released a version as a single in Australia.
- Also in 1969 Dusty Springfield performed a version live on her BBC TV show Decidedly Dusty.
- Also in 1969 Sonny Stitt released a version as a single that was featured on his album Come Hither.
- In 1970 Giorgio Moroder released a version on his album That's Bubblegum – That's Giorgio also known as Giorgio.
- In 1975 Brian Cadd released a version in the United Kingdom.
- In 1976 Danish band Morning After Rich released a version in their country.
- In 1979 Adrenalin released a version on Musical Signature Records
- In 1980 Leif Garrett released a version on his album Can't Explain.
- In 1984 Helix released a version as a single in Canada on their album Walkin' the Razor's Edge.
- In 1987 I Nuovi Angeli released an Italian version on their album Color Cioccolata, titled "Balla, Balla Con Noi".
- In 2000 Sonny Geraci released a live version on his album On The Verge.

== See also ==
- List of 1960s one-hit wonders in the United States
