= Paul Hackman =

- Born: November 14, 1953; St. Thomas, Ontario, Canada
- Died: July 5, 1992 (age 38); Kamloops, British Columbia
- Genres: Hard rock, heavy metal
- Occupation: Musician
- Instrument: Guitar
- Years active: 1976–1992
- Labels: H&S, Capitol
- Formerly of: Helix

Paul Wayne Hackman (November 14, 1953 – July 5, 1992) was a Canadian guitarist who performed with the rock band Helix from 1976 until his death in a road accident. Among the hits which contain his playing are the #32 Canadian single "Rock You" and the #20 mainstream Canadian rock single "Deep Cuts the Knife", which he co-wrote with Bob Halligan Jr.

== Career with Helix ==
A native of the Southwestern Ontario city of St. Thomas, Paul Hackman played in two local bands, Whitehorse and Purple Wedge. He joined Helix in 1976 when original keyboardist Don Simmons handed in his resignation. Hackman saw an ad for a replacement keyboard player in the newspaper and contacted Helix manager William Seip. Hackman informed Seip that he too had been searching for a keyboard player for his own band, and hadn't found one in six months. He convinced Seip to let him audition as a new guitar player, which took place at the Seip farm in Baden, a small Ontario community. Hackman was offered the gig, and according to lead vocalist Brian Vollmer, "our sound became heavier and more aggressive."

Helix released two independent albums on their own H&S Records, entitled Breaking Loose and White Lace & Black Leather, in 1979 and 1981 respectively. Helix signed with Capitol Records in 1983 and released No Rest for the Wicked. This album featured Canadian hit video "Heavy Metal Love", which Hackman and Vollmer co-wrote. Long Way to Heaven, featuring Hackman's "Deep Cuts The Knife", followed in 1985. In 1986, another Hackman co-write, "It's Too Late" from the movie soundtrack to Iron Eagle, was released. The 1987 album Wild in the Streets was considered a disappointment by Capitol Records, only managing an unexpectedly low #179 on the Billboard 200 in the United States, although the album did go gold in Canada. By the end of the 1980s, Hackman had toured not only all over Canada, United States and England, but even played in Sweden and Trinidad. In 1990, after a short break, Helix released what would turn out to be its final album with Hackman, Back for Another Taste, for which Hackman and Vollmer co-wrote "Runnin' Wild in the 21st Century".

== Death and legacy ==
Hackman and Brian Vollmer agreed to take a short break, during which Vollmer would compose songs for a solo album, while Hackman would write for the next Helix CD. A tour of Western Canada was booked for the 1992 summer touring season. On July 5, following a concert in Vancouver, the group's van veered off and rolled down a 40-foot embankment and Paul Hackman, asleep in a seat behind the driver, was thrown from the vehicle and died upon being taken to a hospital in the nearby city of Kamloops. He was 38 years old and lived with his wife, Connie in Port Franks, a village in his native Southwestern Ontario.

After Hackman's death, Vollmer released the solo album he was working on as the next Helix album, It's a Business Doing Pleasure, in 1993. He included the song "That Day Is Gonna Come" as a tribute to Hackman, with the song's video featuring unique Super 8 and video footage shot by Vollmer on the road over the years.

Hackman's most enduring song, "Heavy Metal Love", was resurrected for the Trailer Park Boys movie The Big Dirty. The then-current version of Helix later re-recorded the song and included it on their 2006 EP Get Up!.

== Discography ==
=== Helix albums ===
- Breaking Loose (1979)
- White Lace & Black Leather (1981)
- No Rest for the Wicked (1983)
- Walkin' the Razor's Edge (1984)
- Live at the Marquee (1984) (promotional live EP)
- Long Way to Heaven (1985)
- Wild in the Streets (1987)
- Back for Another Taste (1990)

=== Helix compilations ===
- Over 60 minutes with... (1989)
- The Early Years (1991) (reissue of first two albums)

=== Posthumous Helix albums ===
- half-ALIVE (1998)
- Deep Cuts: The Best Of (1999) (compilation)
- B-Sides (1999)
- Live! in Buffalo (2001) (live)

=== DVDs ===
- S.E.X. Rated (DVD 2001, VHS 1991)
- 30 Years of Helix: No Rest for the Wicked (DVD 2004)
