= Brian Vollmer =

- Born: June 30, 1955 (age 71)
- Origin: Listowel, Ontario, Canada
- Genres: Hard rock; heavy metal
- Occupation: Musician
- Instruments: Vocals; guitar; cowbell
- Years active: 1974–present
- Labels: H&S Records; Aquarius; A&M; Dirty Dog Records; Capitol; EMI/Sanctuary; Vollmer Records; DeRock Records
- Member of: Helix

Brian Joseph Vollmer (born June 30, 1955) is the lead singer and only remaining original member of Canadian hard rock group Helix. Since the band's inception in 1974, Vollmer had gone from lead singer to de facto leader of the band, weathering numerous lineup changes. Vollmer was born in Listowel, Ontario before relocating to Kitchener.

== Life and career ==
=== Helix ===
Helix were formed in 1974 for a Battle of the Bands contest in Kitchener, Ontario, Canada by drummer Bruce Arnold and lead guitarist Ron Watson. Their original name was the Helix Field Band, soon shortened to simply Helix. By 1976, the band lineup had solidified to include twins Brent "The Doctor" Doerner (guitar) and Brian Doerner (drums), as well as Paul Hackman (guitar) and Keith "Bert" Zurbrigg (bass). With management under Kitchener's William Seip, Helix released two independent albums on their own H&S Records, entitled Breaking Loose and White Lace & Black Leather, in 1979 and 1981 respectively. Their second album, White Lace & Black Leather saw more lineup changes, with Brian Vollmer now the last remaining original member.

In 1983, Helix finally signed to Capitol Records after being rejected by them three times. In 1983, they released No Rest for the Wicked, their major label debut. The "classic" 1980s lineup of Helix formed after this, now consisting of Brent Doerner, Paul Hackman, Greg "Fritz" Hinz (drums), and Daryl Gray (bass). This lineup recorded three more records for Capitol: Walkin' the Razor's Edge (1984), Long Way to Heaven (1985), and Wild in the Streets (1987). By 1990, Brent Doerner had left the band, setting off a chain of member changes that would leave Vollmer as the sole constant member.

The 1990s started off with the Back for Another Taste album, and a special reunion show in Kitchener featuring Keith Zurbrigg and the Doerner brothers. At this time Brian Vollmer began working on his first solo album. However, in 1992, Vollmer's longtime bandmate Paul Hackman was killed when the group's van rolled down a 40-foot embankment after a concert in Vancouver. Recovering from the shock of his death, he took the songs he had recorded for his solo album, and released them as the next Helix record, It's a Business Doing Pleasure (released on Aquarius) in 1993. Vollmer would later call the album, "a huge mistake on my part, and I take full credit for the blunder. The really sad thing about it all was that I was really proud of all those songs on the album and they were wasted because they did not fit under the Helix name."

Helix continued to tour after this tragedy, with new drummer Glen "Archie" Gamble, bassist Daryl Gray, and a rotating lineup of guitar players. In 1999, he released his first proper solo album featuring Brian Doerner on drums, called When Pigs Fly. This was released under the band name "Vollmer". In 2004, the 30th anniversary of Helix, the band played a special concert at Brantford, Ontario's Sanderson Centre. The then-current lineup of Helix played a short set, followed by members of the original 1974 Helix lineup. Other past members made appearances on hits and rarely played songs from the independent albums.

Around this time, Vollmer filmed a cameo (as himself) during the fourth season of the Canadian television show Trailer Park Boys that was included on that DVD as a deleted scene. Helix was mentioned in several other episodes after this as well, as it was revealed they are one of the characters' favourite concerts to see, and sell marijuana at. Vollmer also published his autobiography, Gimme An R, in December 2005. The book covered the numerous lineup changes and ups and downs of Helix through their 30-year career, along with many rare photos.

In 2009, Brian Vollmer reunited the surviving members of the classic 1980s lineup: Daryl Gray, Greg "Fritz" Hinz, and Brent Doerner. Vollmer cited fatigue of the rotating Helix lineups: "Daryl, Brent and Fritz have all 'been there, done that, got the T-shirt.' So I thought, 'What the hell? Why not just get the original band back together and save myself a big headache?'...We just realized we're better as a unit — and I got sick of working in new people."

Brian Vollmer had a cameo appearance in the 2009 Trailer Park Boys movie Countdown To Liquor Day, released September 25, 2009. Helix also performed at the opening gala of the premier of the new Trailer Park Boys movie at the Halifax Metro Center.

Since 2008, Vollmer has co-produced every Helix release alongside Aaron Murray, and occasionally his co-writers Sean Kelly, Steve Georgakopoulos and Gord Prior.

=== Personal life ===
At various stages of his career, Brian Vollmer thought seriously of folding Helix. The first time came at the end of 1989 when Brent Doerner quit the band. Vollmer and manager Bill Seip decided to keep the band going despite the loss. After the 1990/1991 tour for Back for Another Taste, which saw the band playing smaller venues, Vollmer again talked to Seip about folding the band. Seip's advice was to keep this information to himself, so he could either quit and do something else, or come back to Helix later. With the 2002 departure of Daryl Gray, who was like a partner in the Helix business, Vollmer again pondered quitting the band. Each time, he decided to keep going.

In the late 80s, living in Kitchener, Ontario, Vollmer was divorced and working at a convenience store to make ends meet. It was during this time that he was mugged and decided to make the move to London, Ontario to live with friends and make a fresh start. His vocal cords, however, were in very bad shape due to years of touring and no vocal training. He met a vocal coach, Ed Johnson, who taught him the techniques of Bel canto, which helped to restore his voice to full strength.

=== Teaching and Planet Helix ===
In addition to running the Helix business, Brian Vollmer also currently teaches the classical vocal technique, Bel canto, in London, Ontario, as well as singing classical music at weddings and funerals throughout southern Ontario. He has given vocal lessons to Morgan Lander of the heavy metal band Kittie who also hail from London. His wife Lynda now helps with the running of the business from their home, which they have dubbed "Planet Helix". "Planet Helix" was featured in a 2007 episode of MTV Cribs.

== Discography ==
=== With Helix ===
For a more comprehensive list, see Helix discography.

- Breaking Loose (1979)
- White Lace & Black Leather (1981)
- No Rest for the Wicked (1983)
- Walkin' the Razor's Edge (1984)
- Long Way to Heaven (1985)
- Wild in the Streets (1987)
- Back for Another Taste (1990)
- It's a Business Doing Pleasure (1993)
- half-ALIVE (1998)
- B-Sides (1999)
- Live! in Buffalo (2002) (live)
- Rockin' in My Outer Space (2004)
- The Power of Rock and Roll (2007)
- A Heavy Mental Christmas (2008)
- Vagabond Bones (2009)
- Smash Hits...Unplugged! (November 2010)
- Bastard of the Blues (2014)
- Old School (2019)
- Scrap Metal (2026)

=== Solo (as Vollmer) ===
- When Pigs Fly (1999)
- Get Yer Hands Dirty (2017)

=== Related Recordings ===
- Raising The Roof on Mary Immaculate (2005) - charity CD featuring Brian Vollmer
