= One of the Family =

One of the Family may refer to:

- One of the Family (novel), written by Monica Dickens
- One of the Family (film), a 2018 Italian comedy film directed by Alessio Maria Federici.
