= Fairfield Hospital, Bedfordshire =

Fairfield Hospital
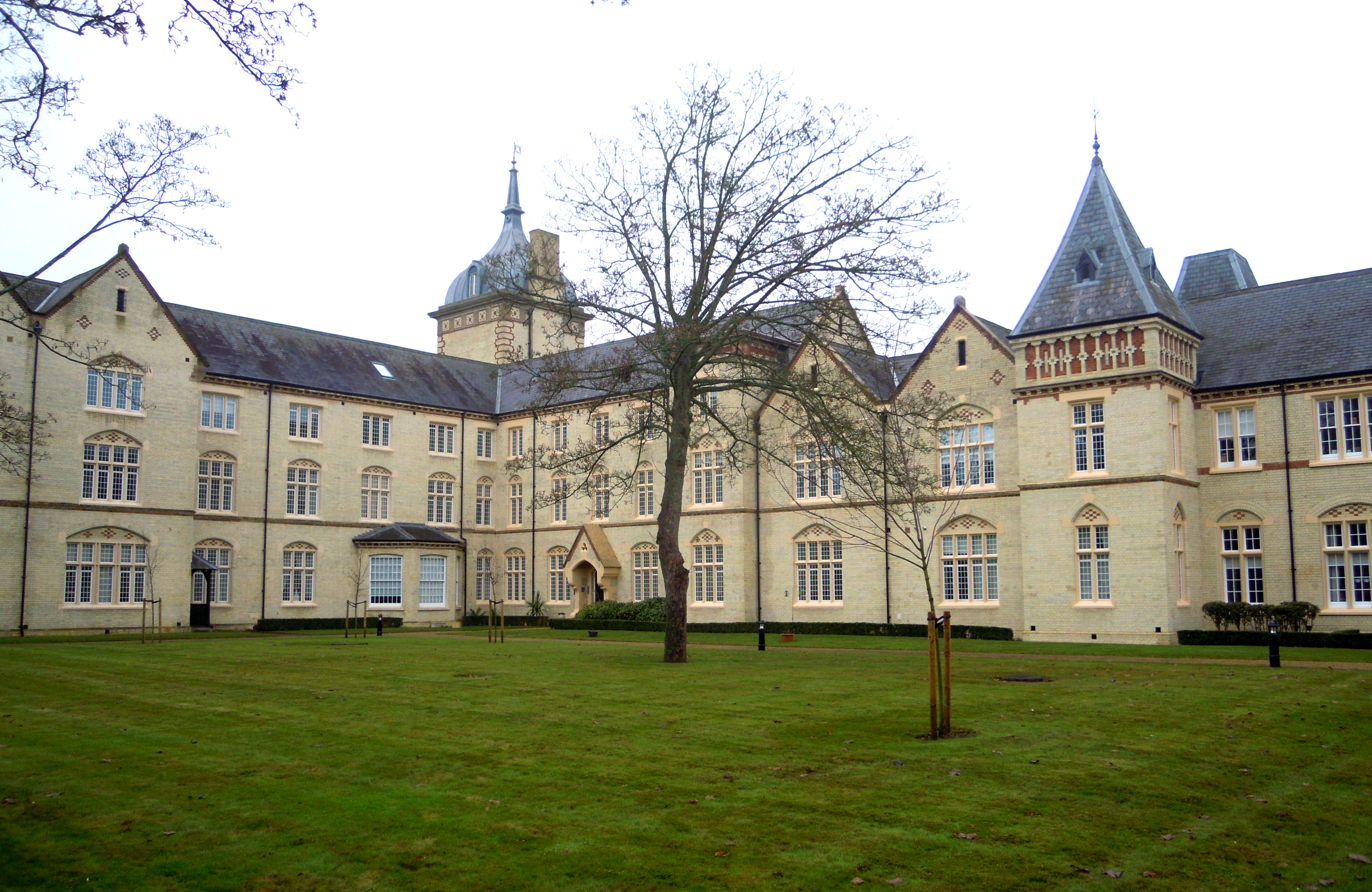
- Fairfield Hospital

- Shown in Bedfordshire

Geography
- Location: Fairfield, United Kingdom
- Coordinates: 52.00219°N 0.2478°W

Organisation
- Care system: Public NHS
- Type: Psychiatric

Services
- Emergency department: No Accident & Emergency

History
- Founded: 1860
- Closed: 1999

Links
- Lists: Hospitals in the United Kingdom

Fairfield Hospital in Fairfield, Bedfordshire, England was a psychiatric hospital from 1860 to 1999. It is a Grade II listed building.

== History ==
Construction of the Fairfield Three Counties Asylum by William Webster on a 253-acre (1.02 km^{2}) site between Letchworth, Arlesey and Stotfold commenced in 1856. The new hospital replaced the Bedford Lunatic Asylum in Ampthill Road in Bedford, which had been built in 1812. The Fairfield Hospital was designed by George Fowler Jones with the longest corridor in the United Kingdom, at half a mile long. The clay for its bricks came from the nearby Arlesey Pits. The hospital, which catered for patients from Bedfordshire, Hertfordshire and Huntingdonshire, opened with the transfer of 6 male and 6 female patients from Bedford Lunatic Asylum on 8 March 1860.

By 1861 the number of patients had expanded to 460, with 248 female and 212 male patients. At this time the asylum employed about 256 local people from the surrounding villages, including 66 men in its garden and small farm, where produce for the asylum's kitchen was grown, and 33 women in the laundry and wash house. The chapel and cemetery were added in 1879, with the East stained-glass window being added in 1920 in memory of the asylum's staff and former inmates who died in the First World War. During and after that War the asylum treated male and female patients with shell shock.

Following the enactment of the Mental Treatment Act 1930 the Three Counties Asylum became known as the Three Counties Hospital. At its height in 1936 Fairfield Hospital catered for 1,100 patients, with the grounds of the hospital having increased to 410 acres (1.7 km^{2}) through the purchase of additional farm land. Of these 410 acres 385 were cultivated.

In 1948 the Three Counties Hospital became part of the National Health Service, and, in 1960, it was renamed Fairfield Hospital. In that year Fairfield Hospital hit the national headlines when the hospital's chaplain, the Reverend John Arthur Monk, married a girl forty years younger than himself in the hospital's chapel.

In 1981 the Conservative Government published its 'Care in the Community' report. Its aim was a more liberal way of helping people with mental health problems, by removing them from impersonal, often Victorian institutions, such as Fairfield Hospital, and caring for them in their own homes. Also, better drugs became available so that patients could be treated at home. It was also meant to reduce the cost of institutionalizing so many mentally ill people. This Act led to the closure of many psychiatric hospitals including Fairfield Hospital, which finally closed in 1999.

The main building with its water towers is Grade II listed, the façade having been restored and its interior being converted into flats and a health club and renamed Fairfield Hall. The grounds have also been developed into housing. The whole redevelopment of the hospital site and grounds constitutes a village called Fairfield, which became a civil parish in 2013.

== In the media ==
My Turn to Make the Tea, the 1951 semi-autobiographical novel by Monica Dickens, features Fairfield Hospital as the Northgate Asylum. The 2003 film Requiem starring Jason Connery was filmed at Fairfield Hospital.

== See also ==
- Healthcare in Bedfordshire

== Gallery ==
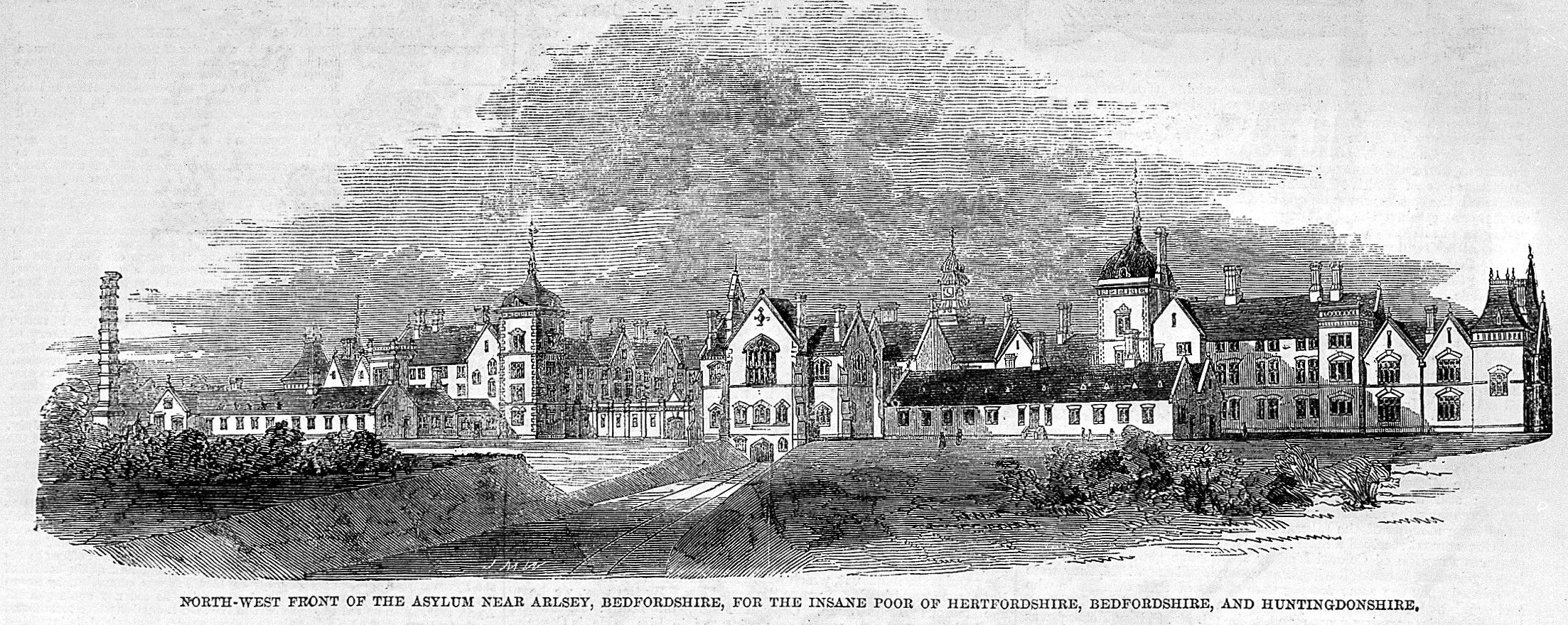
Fairfield Hospital in 1860

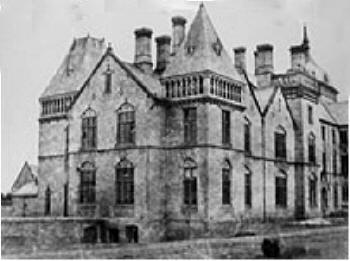
Another view in 1860

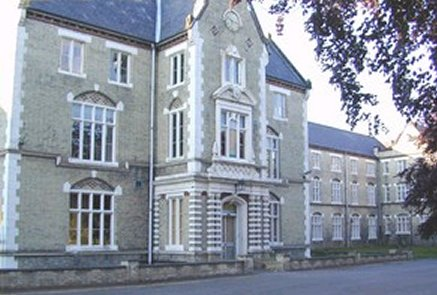
Fairfield Hospital at the time of its closure in 1999

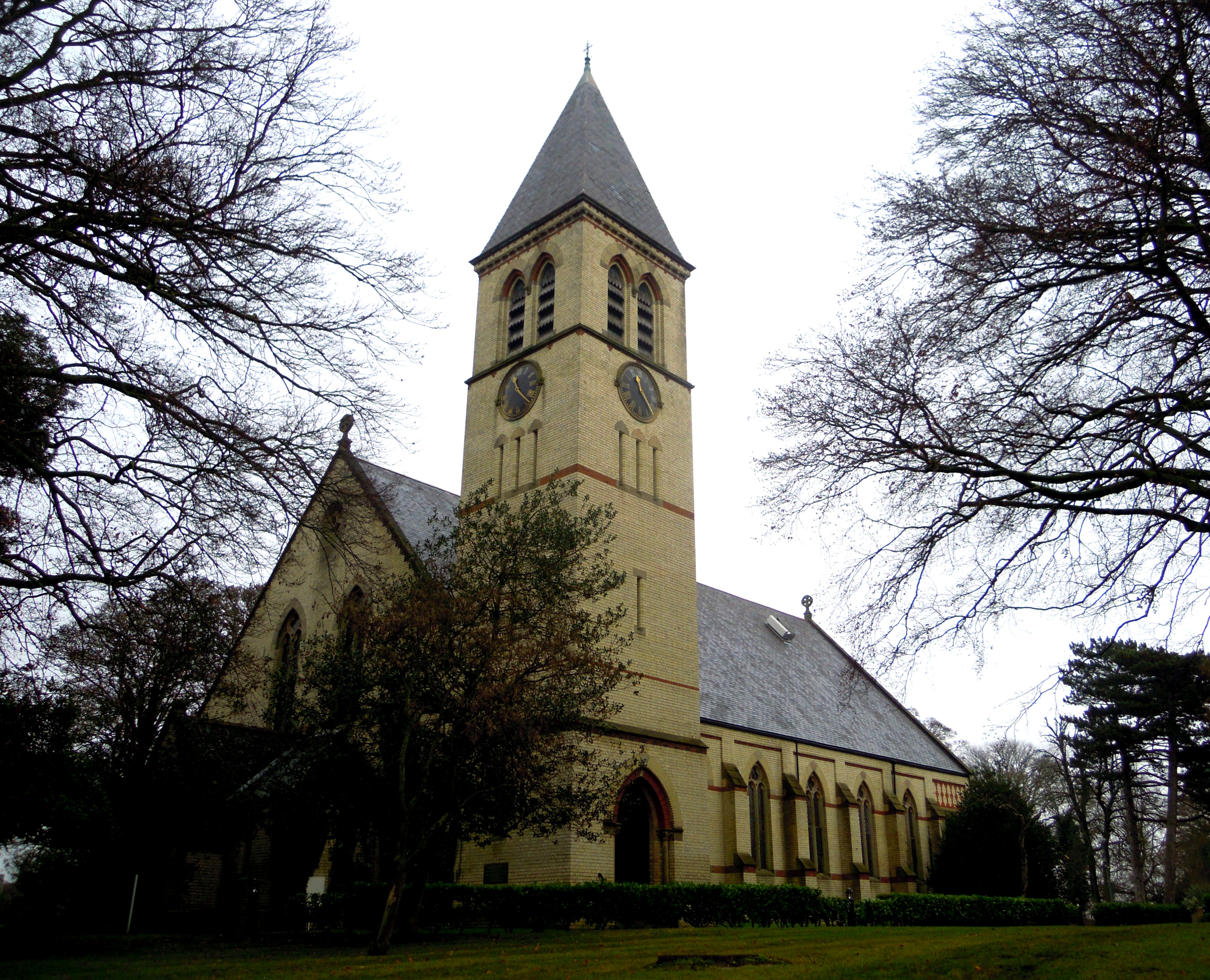
The hospital's chapel in 2016
