= Annabelle Dowler =

English actress

- Born: 1974 (age 51–52); Formby, Merseyside, England
- Education: University of Bristol
- Occupation: Actress

Annabelle Dowler (born 1974) is an English actress.

== Early life and education ==
She was born and raised in Formby, Merseyside, and attended Holy Family High School. She studied Spanish and Drama at the University of Bristol before touring Spain with a bilingual drama group. She has worked on the stage including at the National Theatre, Liverpool Everyman, Liverpool Playhouse and the Creation Theatre in Oxford.

== Career ==
Dowler appeared in the Channel 4 adaptation of The Six Wives of Henry VIII as Catherine of Aragon, in a 40-minute episode. She also appeared in the Lewis episode "The Quality of Mercy" and in the ITV programme The Bill. In addition, Dowler has performed radio drama, including BBC Radio 4's productions of Agatha Christie's The Mysterious Affair at Styles and Monica Dickens's My Turn to Make the Tea. Since 2001, she has played Kirsty Miller in the BBC Radio 4 soap opera The Archers.

Dowler also provided the voice for May, one of the two main protagonists in the 2021 video game It Takes Two by Hazelight Studios. She is one of two narrators for The Real A&E.
