= Sir Arthur Conan Doyle's Sherlock Holmes =

Sir Arthur Conan Doyle's Sherlock Holmes may refer to:

- Sherlock Holmes (1965 TV series), a British television series starring Peter Cushing
- Sherlock Holmes (2010 film), a 2010 British-American steampunk mystery film
