= John Brass (disambiguation) =

John Brass (born 1946) is an Australian rugby union and rugby league footballer.

John Brass may also refer to:

- John Brass (colliery manager) (1879–1961), British mine manager and later director of Houghton Main Colliery Co Ltd.
- John Brass (writer) (1790–1833), English clergyman, classicist and educational writer

== See also ==
- Leonard John Brass (1900–1971), Australian and American botanist, botanical collector and explorer
