= Church of St Mary, Stotfold =

Church in Stotfold, Bedfordshire, England

Coordinates: 52.0151°N 0.2233°W

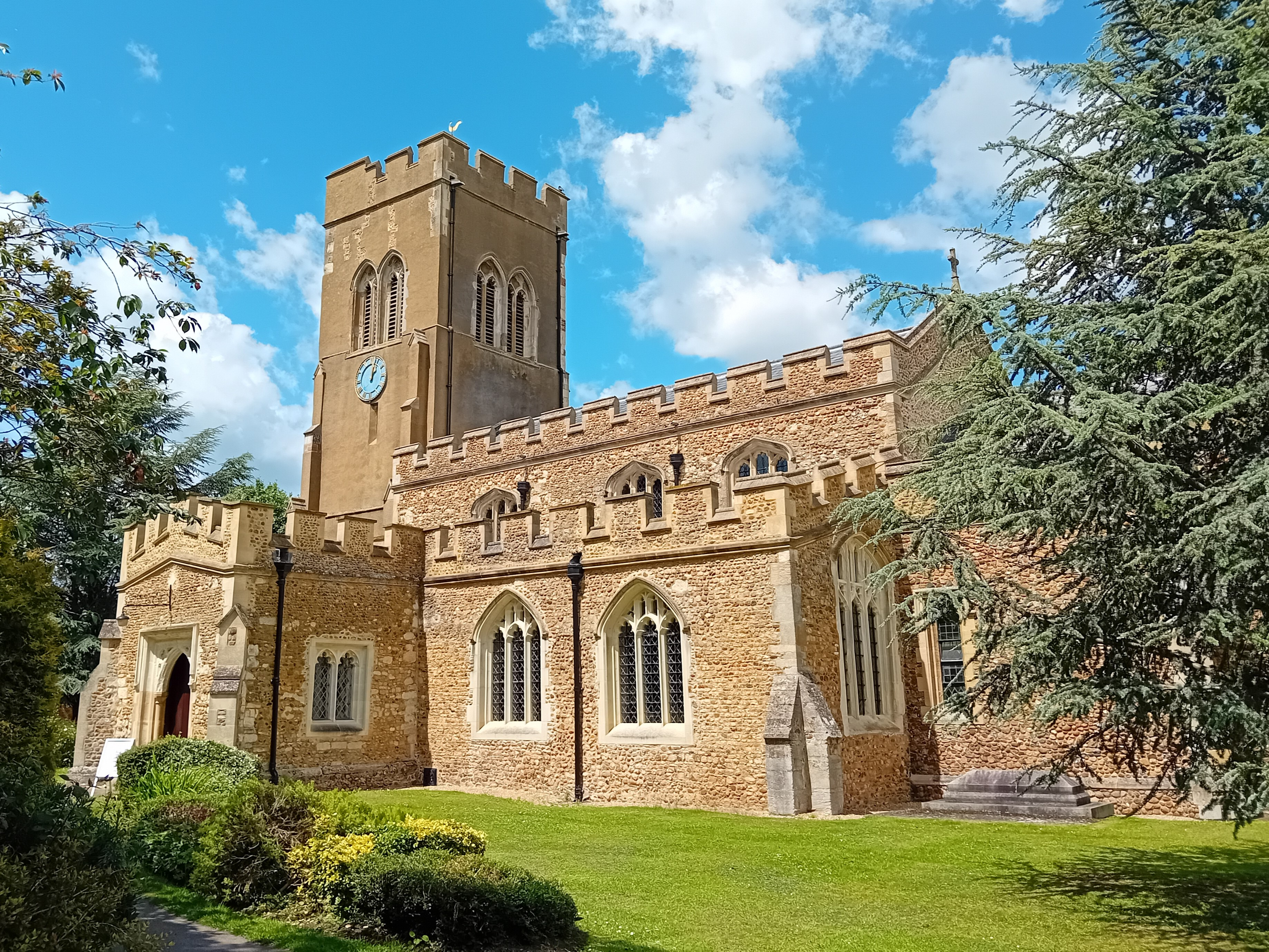
St Mary's church in Stotfold

The Church of St Mary the Virgin is the Church of England parish church for Stotfold and nearby Fairfield in Bedfordshire. The church comes under the Diocese of St Albans and is Grade II* listed.

== History ==
The present building dates from at least 1150 and was granted to Chicksands Priory by Payn de Beauchamp, founder of the Priory. This church was probably preceded by a series of wooden Saxon churches on the same site, because in about 1890 excavations in the nave of the present church revealed a Saxon coffin containing human bones. The nave was built in 1150 and there are traces of a transept chapel in the north-east aisle. The church is built of flint with Ashwell clunch stone dressings to the buttresses and is mainly in the Early Perpendicular style. In 1320 a north aisle was added to the structure which took in this transept chapel. In about 1370 part of the south aisle was extended to its present size by piercing the side walls with arches to open it up. The original outer facing can still be seen on the two thick piers, which were left as supports on either side. In about 1450 the tower was added and the chancel widened, and it is believed that the baptismal font also dates from this time and is octagonal and panelled.

The clerestory walls and windows were added in about 1480 and the thatched nave roof was replaced with lead. The mediaeval glass was destroyed during the English Civil War apart from a few fragments in one of the windows of the north aisle.

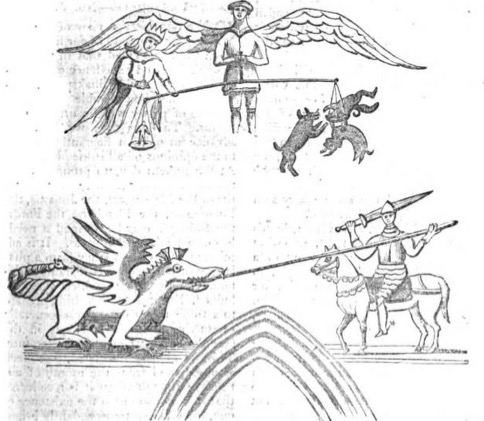
The lost paintings which were destroyed in 1824

In about 1824 much work was done at the church which included plastering the roof of the north aisle and replacing both the mediaeval carvings and the 400 year-old pews, the latter being done by local contractor William Seymour of Arlesey. At the same time the old paintings on the walls of St. George and the Dragon, St. Michael weighing souls, etc., were either whitewashed over or destroyed and the walls covered with wooden panelling; this panelling was removed in 1932. The chancel was rebuilt in 1890 and the floor raised by seven inches. The north porch was demolished for reasons now unknown. A clock was added to the tower in 1910 as a memorial to Rev. John Holding, who is also commemorated by the stained glass in the east window.

== Notable clergy ==
John Brass (1790–1833), a clergyman, classicist and educational writer was priest at the church from 1824 until his death in 1833. Joseph Finch Fenn was priest at the church from 1847 to 1860 in which year he was succeeded by the Greek Testament critic Arthur Ayres Ellis who remained at the church until his death in 1887.

== The bells ==
Originally the tower housed five bells but one was sold to the parish at nearby Arlesey and another went to Astwick. A bell made by Miles Graye in 1651 was cracked and another made by Thomas Russell in 1740 was out of tune. In 1948 John Taylor & Co of Loughborough recast the Miles Graye bell and supplied three new bells. The cost of this work was covered by public subscription in thanksgiving for the end of World War II. These five bells were tuned to the oldest surviving bell in the chamber dated 1484. The last two bells of the current eight-bell peal were added in 1976, again by public subscription.

== Gallery ==
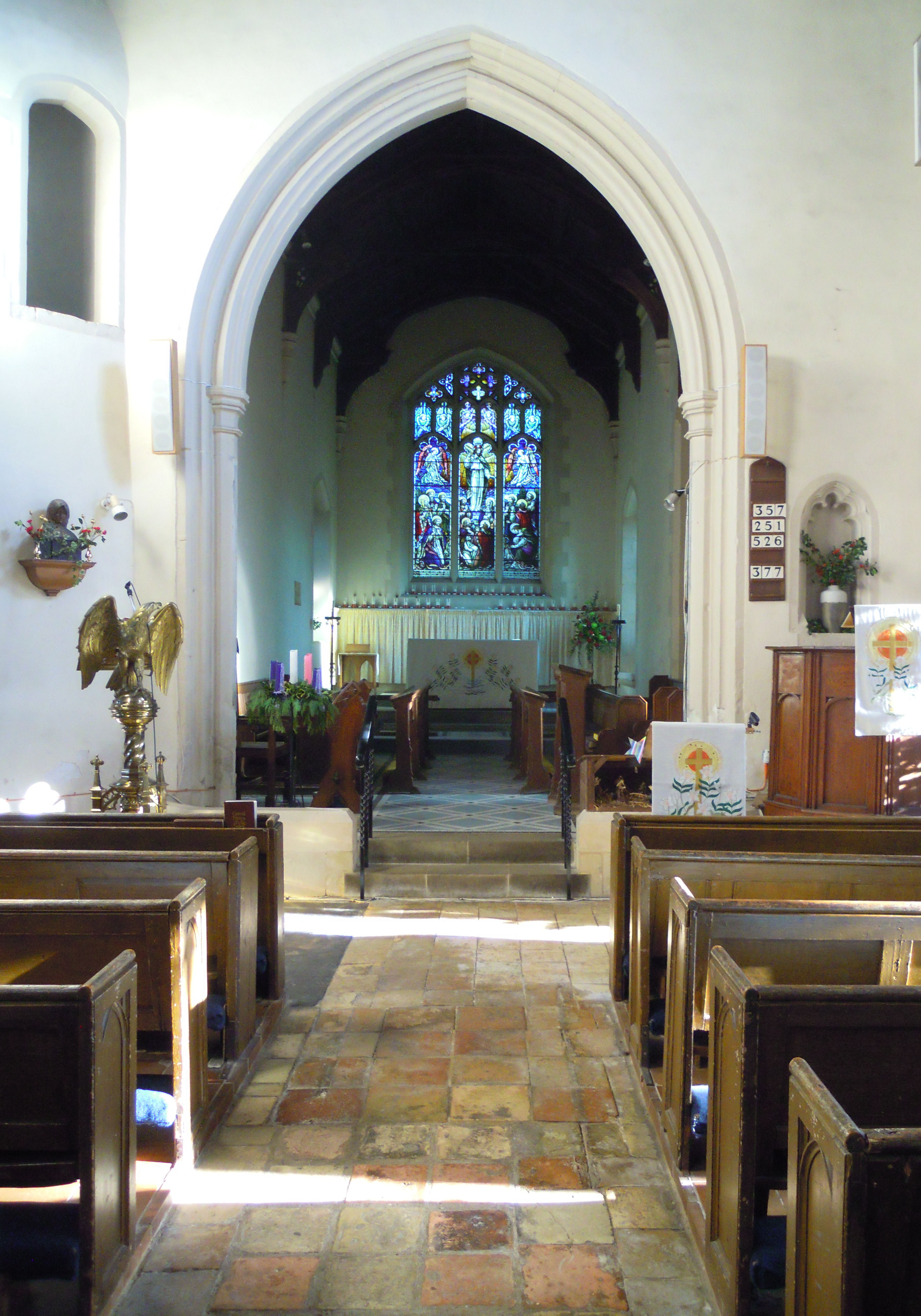
View down the nave towards the chancel

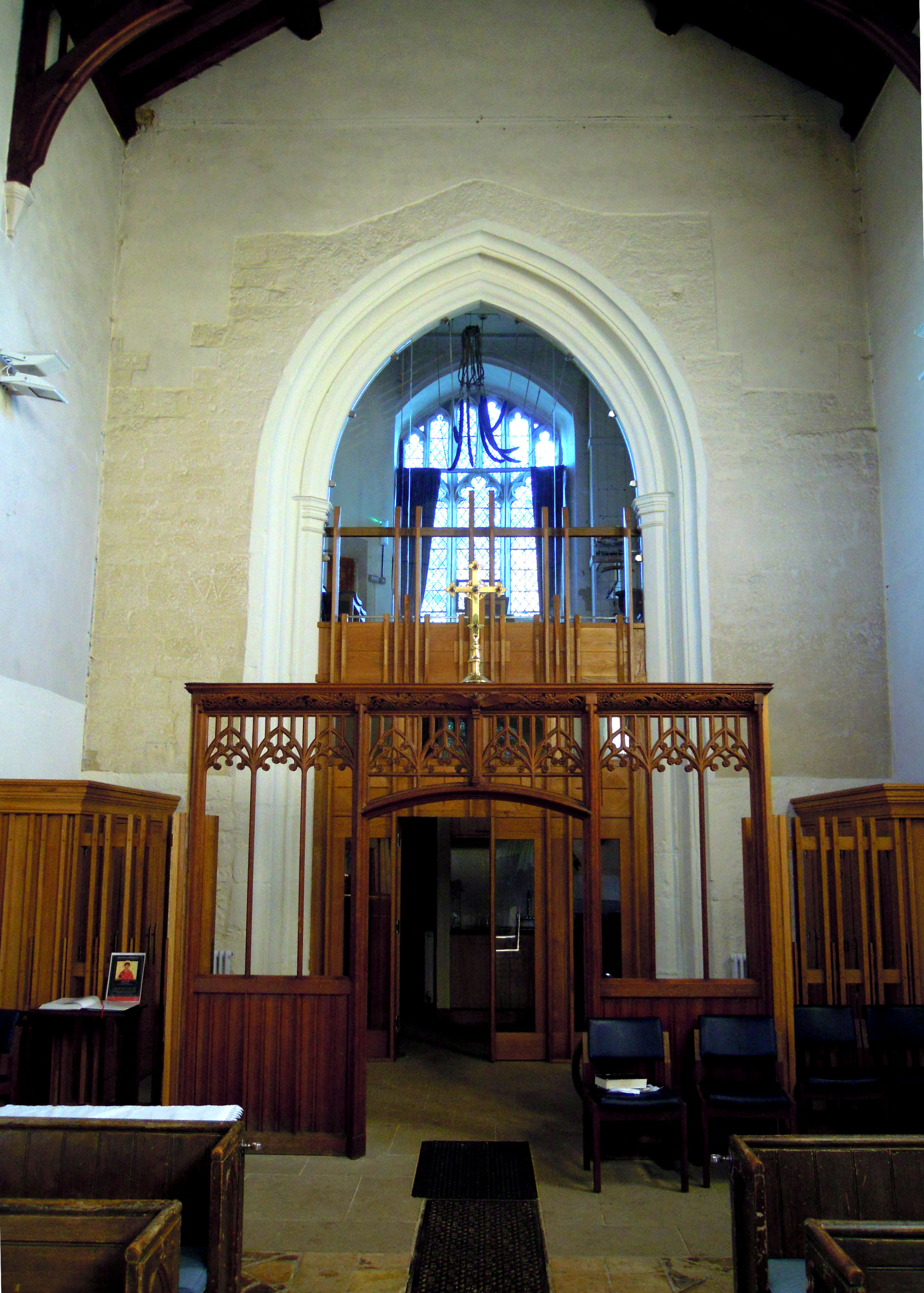
The former rood screen is at the church's west end

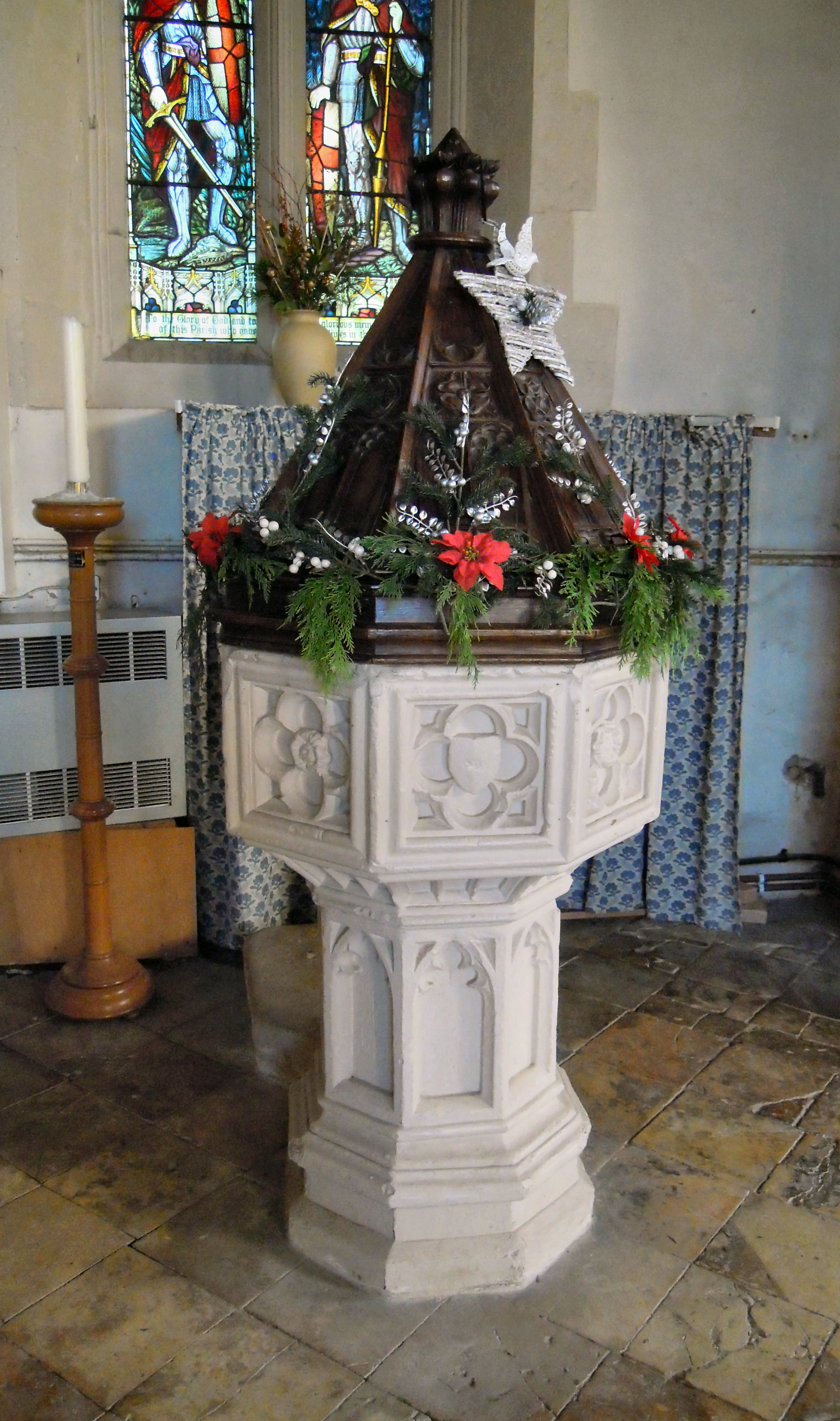
The baptismal font dates to about 1450

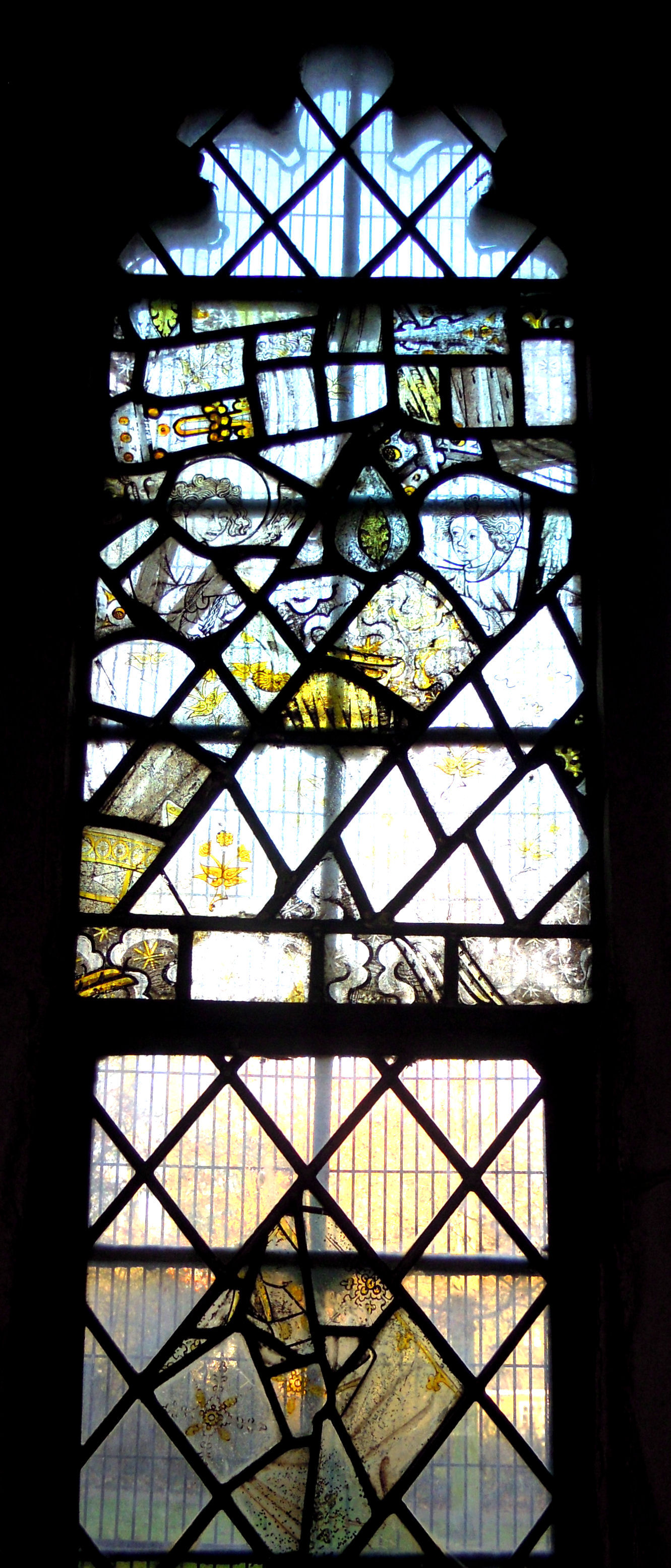
The remains of the medieval glass

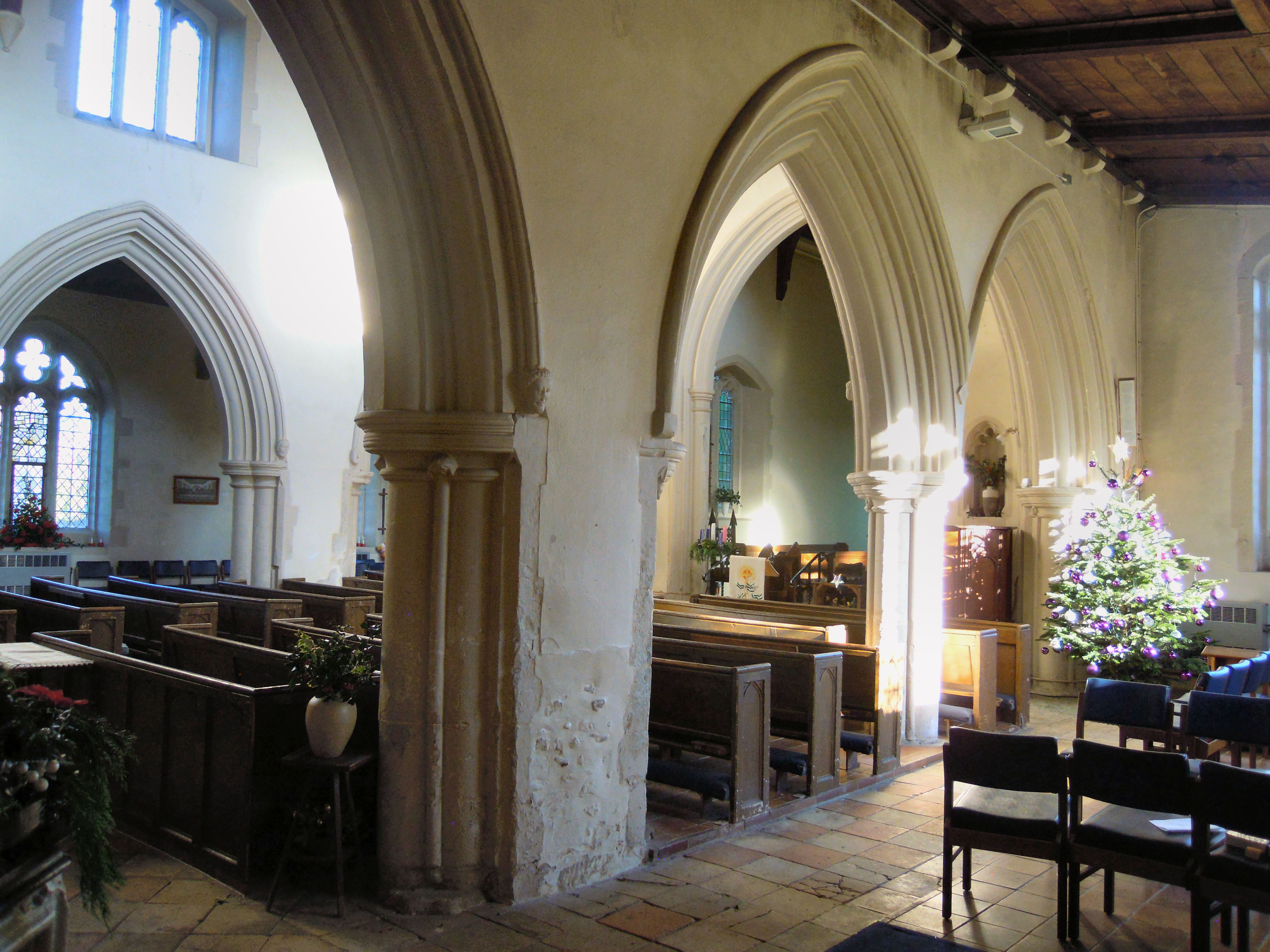
The arches were added in c.1370 when the church was widened
