= Howard Busgang =

Canadian comedian and television producer

- Education: McGill University
- Occupations: Comedian, television producer

Howard Busgang is a Canadian comedian and television producer.

== Comedy career ==
Originally from Montreal, Quebec, he studied political science at McGill University before beginning to perform as a stand-up comedian in 1979. He had some supporting roles in film and television, including the film Terror Train and guest roles in the television series The Edison Twins and Check It Out!, before he and Shawn Thompson created the short-run comedy series We Don't Knock, in which they performed improvised pranks on real people, for CBC Television in 1986. In the same year, he was one of the performers in The Young Comedians All Star Reunion, a stand-up comedy special on HBO that also included Howie Mandel, Harry Anderson and Robin Williams.

Following the end of We Don't Knock's run, Busgang and Dale Martindale became cohosts of CBC Television's youth series Switchback. After leaving that show, he moved to Los Angeles where he continued to perform comedy, including an appearance on An Evening at the Improv and touring as an opening act for Mandel. He also appeared in the comedy film A Man Called Sarge.

== Television writing and production ==
In the early 1990s Busgang began working as a writer, story editor and producer, working on television series such as Good Advice, Boy Meets World and The Closer. He later returned to Canada, working in television as creator, writer and producer of series such as The Blobheads, An American in Canada, The Tournament, Sophie, Single White Spenny and Working the Engels.

== Current activity ==
In 2018, Busgang opened a Montreal-style delicatessen, Buzzy's Luncheonette, on Saltspring Island.
