= Dominic Keating =

British actor (born 1961)

- Keating at Dragon Con in 2026
- Born: Dominic Power; 1 July 1961 (age 65); Leicester, Leicestershire, England
- Education: University College London
- Years active: 1987–present
- Spouse: Sarah Falk (m. 2025)

Dominic Keating (né Power; born 1 July 1961) is a British television, film, and theatre actor best known for his portrayals of Tony in the Channel 4 sitcom Desmond's and Lieutenant Malcolm Reed on Star Trek: Enterprise.

== Early life and education ==
Keating was born Dominic Power to parents Patricia (née Keating) and Lawrence Power, in Leicester. His father was Irish and his mother worked as an actress for a number of years. His maternal grandfather, a brigadier, was awarded an OBE.

Keating took part in his first stage performance while he was attending prep school at LGS Stoneygate. He played the character Cripple in The Ragged School. He then attended Uppingham School where he continued pursuing drama under Chris Richardson. At Uppingham School Theatre, Keating played Laertes in a production of Hamlet; Rowan Atkinson reviewed the performance. Keating was part of the Cadet Force before realising he did not wish to proceed with a military career.

After graduating from the University College London with first class honours in history, Keating tried various jobs before deciding to become a professional actor.

== Career ==
Since there was another Dominic Power already represented by the actor's union Equity, he took his mother's maiden name of Keating. To obtain his Equity card, he worked in a drag act called Feeling Mutual.

=== Theatre ===
Keating had success on the UK stage before working as a television and film actor. He originated the roles of Cosmo in Philip Ridley's The Pitchfork Disney and Bryan in Michael Wall's Amongst the Barbarians, for which Wall won first prize in the Mobil Playwrighting Competition. Keating's stage work in the United Kingdom includes the one-man play The Christian Brothers at King's Cross, The Best Years of Your Life at the Man in the Moon Theatre, Screamers at the Edinburgh Playhouse Festival. In Los Angeles, he has appeared in Alfie at the Tiffany Theater.

Year	Title	Role	Theatre	Notes
1987	The Best Years of Your Life	Marc	Man in the Moon Theatre, London	
1989	Amongst Barbarians	Bryan	Royal Exchange Theatre, Manchester and Hampstead Theatre, London	
1988	Screamers	Rodney	Edingburgh Playhouse Studio	
1990	Private Times	Prison warder, young gangster	Library Theatre, Manchester	
1991	The Pitchfork Disney	Cosmo Disney	The Bush Theatre, London	
1991	Four Door Saloon		Hampstead Theatre	
	The Christian Brothers	Jesuit school teacher	King's Cross, London	One-man play
	Alfie		Tiffany Theater, California	Keating's first role in Los Angeles

=== Television ===
Keating first received major attention in the UK with a semi-regular role as Tony in the Channel 4 sitcom Desmond's (1989–94) which he was cast for after his role in the play Screamers. He has made guest appearances in Inspector Morse and other television programmes.

After moving to the United States, he received the role of the demonic warrior Mallos on the short-lived 2000 series The Immortal, and starred in the Zalman King series ChromiumBlue.com. He also guest starred on series including Buffy The Vampire Slayer, G vs E and Special Unit 2, before landing a role in the main cast of Star Trek: Enterprise as Lieutenant Malcolm Reed; the show ran for four seasons. Since then, he has had guest roles on the series Las Vegas, Holby City and the CSI: NY episode "Uncertainty Rules".

Keating joined the cast of the hit show Heroes for its second season, playing an Irish mobster in a four-episode arc. He also guest-starred for three episodes on the Fox TV series Prison Break, and in 2010 guest-starred on the FX original series Sons of Anarchy.

=== Film ===
Keating appears in several films including Jungle 2 Jungle, The Hollywood Sign, The Auteur Theory, Certifiably Jonathan, and Hollywood Kills. He lent his voice to Robert Zemeckis's animated version of Beowulf. At a Star Trek convention in Sacramento, California on 9 September 2006, he announced he had been cast as an Australian scientist in the Species sequel Species IV. He stars in Tim Russ's Plugged (2007) and appears as Sherlock Holmes's brother in the film Sherlock Holmes (2010) by the Asylum.

=== Voice work ===
==== Video Games ====
Keating voices a number of video game characters including the minor character 'Mouse' in BioWare's Dragon Age: Origins (uncredited); Kormac the Templar in Diablo III by Blizzard Entertainment; the dungeon boss Tirathon Saltheril in Blizzard's World of Warcraft: Legion expansion; and Gremlin Prescott in Epic Mickey and Epic Mickey 2: The Power of Two.

==== Audio Drama ====
In 2024, Keating joined audio drama The Sojourn as Fleet Admiral Darius Farren, father of protagonist Captain Cassandra Farren, during the show's second season.

=== Other work ===
==== Commercials ====
In 1988, Keating had a role in a Tango commercial. Keating had a role in two early 1990s Vidal Sassoon commercials, where his British pronunciation of "salon" resulted in a spoof on Saturday Night Live. In 1999, he was in a commercial for the PlayStation game Crash Team Racing.

In 2007, Keating appeared in a promotional campaign for Sprint/Nextel as fictitious British rock star Ian Westbury. Also for Sprint, Keating appeared in a 2009 cinema courtesy spot that encouraged cinema goers to avoid using their phones during the screening of movies.

==== Directing ====
In 1997, Keating was one of the directors for the series The Heartbreak Cafe.

==== Audiobook narration ====
Keating has recorded a number of audiobooks. He described the experience of recording The Iliad: A New Translation by Caroline Alexander over a span of twelve total days as "the most challenging thing [he has] ever done, and the most rewarding".

==== Podcasting ====
From 2022 until December 2023, he was the co-host of the podcast The Shuttlepod Show with his Star Trek: Enterprise co-star Connor Trinneer. In April 2024, after leaving The Shuttlepod Show, Keating and Trinneer announced their new podcast The D-Con Chamber.

== Personal life ==
Keating married Sarah Falk, a child and adolescent psychiatrist, in June 2025; attendees included Keating's Enterprise friends Scott Bakula, John Billingsley, Anthony Montgomery and Connor Trinneer. The couple resides in Los Angeles.

== Filmography ==
=== Film ===
Year	Title	Role	Notes
1994	Shake, Rattle and Rock!	Marc (uncredited)	Television film
1997	Jungle 2 Jungle	Ian	
1998	Folle d'elle (What I Did for Love)	Chris	
1999	The Auteur Theory	Lewis Rugglesworth	
2001	The Hollywood Sign	Steve	
2003	Chromiumblue.com (Cover Me Girls)	Owen	Edited from ChromiumBlue.com (2002 series)
2006	Hollywood Kills	Francis Fenway	
2007	Plugged	Detective Pitchman	Short
2007	Certifiably Jonathan	Nicholas DeBoor	
2007	The Attackmen	Coach Edwards	Short
2007	Species – The Awakening	Forbes McGuire	
2007	Beowulf	Cain	
2009	Ninong	Ninong	
2010	Sherlock Holmes	Thorpe Holmes	
2011	The One Warrior (The Dragon Warrior)	Merlin / Dragon's voice / Narrator	
2012	Sunset Bar	Andre	Short
2016	A Killer Walks Amongst Us	Dobsyn	
2018	Unbelievable!!!!!	Paramedic Hacky	
2019	Maternal Instinct	Sergei	TV Movie
2019	Once Upon a Time in London	Belgian Johnny	
2020	Greyhound	Harry (voice)	
2020	The Host	Benjamin	
2025	The Jolly Monkey	Steven Blythe	
2025	Ballerina Assassin	Bixby	
2025	The Anacondas	Dr. Agustin Stiglitz	

=== Television ===
Year	Title	Role	Notes
1989	The Paradise Club	Gregor	Episode: Snow Business
1989–1992	The Bill	Friend 2 / Patrick Litton / Andrew Jensen	Episodes: You'll Be Back, Old Wounds, and Party Politics
1989–1993	Desmond's	Tony	35 episodes
1990	Casualty	Ian Tilsley	Episode: Remembrance
1992	Inspector Morse	Murray Stone	Episode: Dead on Time
1993	Teenage Health Freak	Tony St. Michael	Episodes: No 2.1, 2.2, 2.3 and 2.6
1994	Rebel Highway	Marc	Uncredited
1995	Love Street	Mark	Episode: Second Chance
1998	Poltergeist: The Legacy	Bryan / Jason Crenshaw	Episode: Father to Son
1999	Buffy the Vampire Slayer	Blair	Episode: Helpless
1999–2000	G vs E	Tomek Walenski, Sergei Draskovic	Episodes: Orange Volvo and Immigrant Evil
2000–2001	The Immortal	Mallos	6 episodes
2001	Special Unit 2	Dr. Harlan Edens	Episode: The Wraps
2001–2005	Star Trek: Enterprise	Malcolm Reed	98 episodes
2002	ChromiumBlue.com	Owen	8 episodes
2006	Las Vegas	Anthony Demby	Episode: Bait and Switch
2007	Heroes	Will	4 episodes
2007	Prison Break	Andrew Tyge	Episodes: Interference and Photo Finish
2008	Holby City	Ollie Lake	Episode: Love Will Tear Us Apart
2010	CSI: NY	Rufus Knox	Episode: Uncertainty Rules
2010	Sons of Anarchy	Luther Barkwill	Episodes: Lochan Mor and Turas
2012	Breakout Kings	Bob Dixon	Episode: Double Down
2024	Phoenix	Billy Blue	Episode: And Yet I Am

=== Voice work ===
Year	Title	Role	Notes
2000	Starlancer	Claymore – Doug McCleod	Video game
2001	Thank You, Jeeves (by P. G. Wodehouse)	Constable	Audiobook published by L. A. Theatre Works. Originally recorded in April 1998 before a live audience at Doubletree Guest Suites, Santa Monica.
2001	Lady Windermere's Fan (by Oscar Wilde)	Mr. Hopper	Audio Theater Audiobook published by L. A. Theatre Works. Originally recorded in May 1999 before a live audience at the Skirball Cultural Center, Los Angeles.
2005	World of Warcraft		Video game
2009	Dragon Age: Origins	Mouse (uncredited)	Video game
2010	Epic Mickey	Gremlin Prescott	Video game
2012	Diablo III	Kormac the Templar	Video game
2012	Epic Mickey 2: The Power of Two	Gremlin Prescott	Video game
2014	Destiny	Xander 99-40 / Arcite 99-40 / City Vendor Frame	Video game
2014	Diablo III: Reaper of Souls	Kormac the Templar	Video game
2015	The General From America (by Richard Nelson)	Major John Andre	Audiobook published by L. A. Theatre Works. Originally recorded in January 1997 before a live audience at Doubletree Suites, Santa Monica.
2016	One of the Family (by Monica Dickens)	Narrator	Audiobook published by Audible Studios
2016	World of Warcraft: Legion	Tirathon Saltheril	Video game
2016	The Iliad: A New Translation by Caroline Alexander	Narrator	Audiobook published by HarperCollins
2017	Destiny 2	Male Frame / Arcite 99-40	Video game
2017	The Mermaid's Daughter (by Ann Claybomb)	Narrator	Audiobook published by HarperCollins
2018	World of Warcraft: Battle for Azeroth		Video game
2019	Labyrinths: Selected Stories & Other Writings (by Jorge Luis Borges)	Narrator	Audiobook published by New Directions
2019	Light of the North Star: Part I: The Descent (by Dhrubajyoti Bhattacharya)	Narrator	Audiobook
2020	World of Warcraft: Shadowlands	Additional voices	Video game
2022	Destiny 2: The Witch Queen	Arcite 99-40 / Male Vendor Frame	Video game
2022	Diablo Immortal		Video game
2022	World of Warcraft: Dragonflight		Video game
2023	Destiny 2: Lightfall	Arcite 99-40 / Male Vendor Frame	Video game
2023	Diablo IV	Additional voices	Video game
2024-2025	The Sojourn	Fleet Admiral Darius Farren	Audiodrama Episodes: 2.1: To Hear the Falconer; 2.3: Render Unto Caesar; 2.4: To Pray for Tempests; 2.5: Arrows of Desire; 2.6: Vanishing Point

=== Appearances as self ===
Year	Title	Notes
2004	Trekkies 2	Documentary
	Through the Keyhole	
2013	The Captains Close Up	Episode: Scott Bakula
2016	50 Years of Star Trek	Documentary
2021	The Center Seat: 55 Years of Star Trek	Documentary
2022	The Shuttlepod Show	Podcast
2024	The D-Con Chamber	Podcast
