= Arthur Ayres Ellis =

Arthur Ayres Ellis (1830 – 22 March 1887) was a Greek Testament critic.

Arthur Ayres Ellis was born in 1830 in Birmingham, the son of Charles Ellis of Birmingham. He was educated at King Edward's School, Birmingham, under Dr. Lee. He entered Trinity College, Cambridge, as a subsizar in 1848, graduated as ninth in the first class of the classical tripos in 1852, was elected fellow in 1854, and took the degree of M.A. in 1855. He was ordained soon afterwards, and filled the office of junior dean of his college, and that of divinity lecturer at Christ's College. In 1860 he was presented by Trinity College to the vicarage of St Mary's church in Stotfold in Bedfordshire, where he remained till his death on 22 March 1887.

While resident in college he gave a great deal of attention to Richard Bentley's preparations for his edition of the Greek Testament, and in 1862 he published at Cambridge the volume entitled Bentleii Critica Sacra, which contains a considerable portion of Bentley's notes extracted from his manuscripts in Trinity College Library, with the Abbé Rulotta's collation of the Vatican Codex (B), an edition of the 'Epistle to the Galatians' given as a specimen of Bentley's intended edition, and an account of his collations.
