= My Turn to Make the Tea =

Book by the British author Monica Dickens

Cover of the first edition (1951)

My Turn to Make the Tea is the third semi-autobiographical book by the British author Monica Dickens. First published in 1951 by Michael Joseph, the book relates Dickens' time working as a junior reporter on the Downingham Post in the fictional town of Downingham.

The book is important for revealing the obstacles faced by many early women reporters in the world of journalism.

== Background ==
Set just after World War II, My Turn to Make the Tea relates the story of 'Poppy', the new and inexperienced junior reporter on the old-established provincial newspaper the Downingham Post in Downingham. She is nicknamed 'Poppy' by her co-workers “for no better reason than that a Sunday paper was running a crude cartoon about a blonde called Poppy Pink”. The book takes its title from the fact that, as the only female member of staff, it is always Poppy's turn to make the tea.

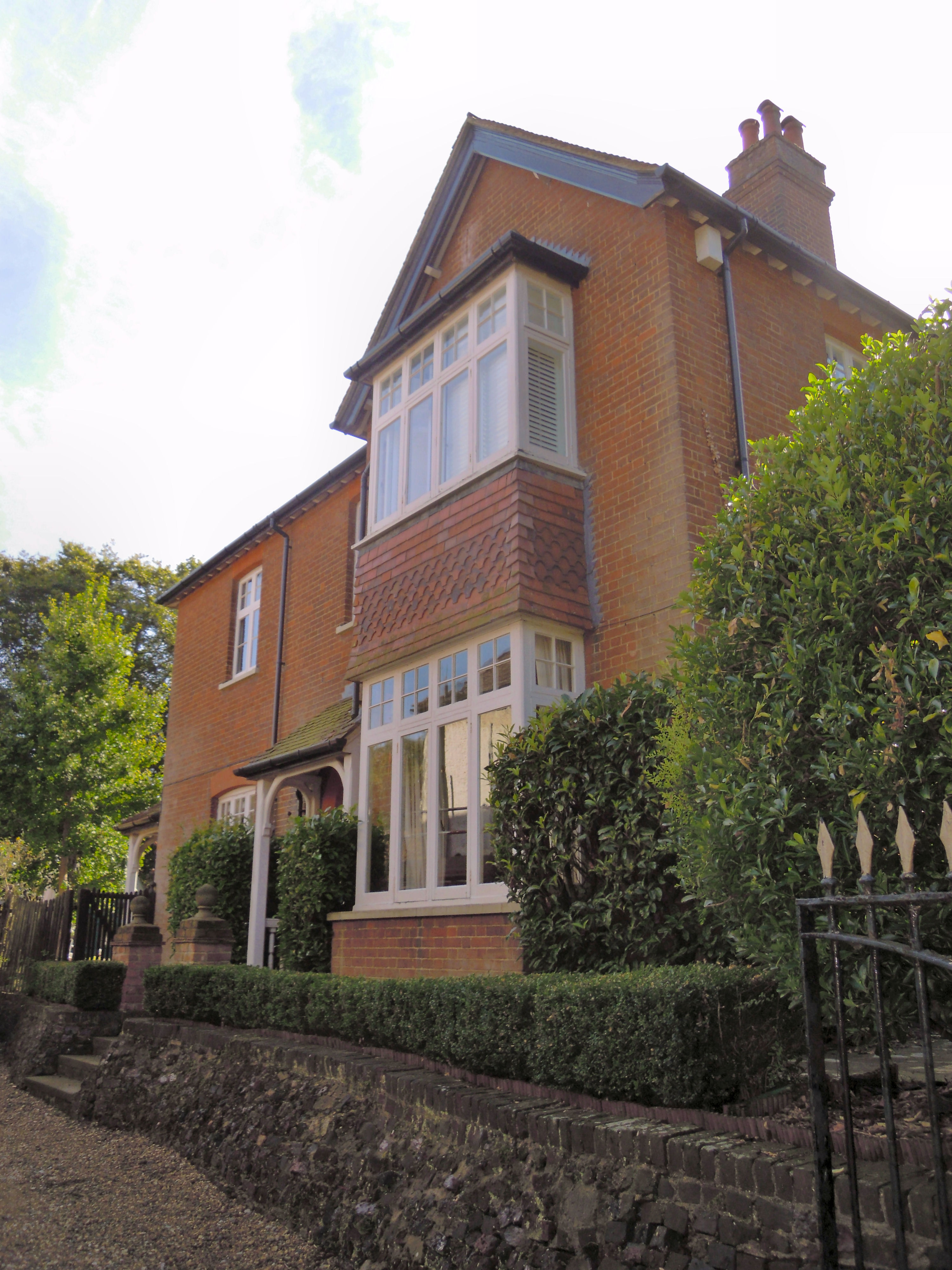
5 Highbury Road, where Monica Dickens lived during her time in Hitchin

The book starts with Poppy finding a room in a boarding house with her irascible chain-smoking landlady Mrs Goff who seldom has a good word to say about anyone except Mr Goff and who tyrannically presides over her lodgers. Other boarders at No 5 Bury Road include the stage acrobat Maimie and her Japanese husband Tick Ling; Win and Connie who are looking for affluent husbands and who fill the bathroom with drying stockings and underwear; Margaret, who dies after a botched abortion, and Myra Nelson, an aspiring ballet dancer who tries to keep the fact she is married secret from her employer, dance instructor the Signora.

Initially keen to make changes to the newspaper by introducing innovative ideas such as a Woman's Column, Poppy soon discovers that the Downingham Post is deeply entrenched in the past and tradition, always including the same features and style of reporting the news because its readers don't like change and feel comfortable with the familiar format. Her attempts at court reporting were not wholly successful with the editor, the middle-aged bachelor Mr Pellet, who is convinced that he knows what the Post's readers want.

After a murder scare at No 5 Bury Road and a night at the fair with Mr Pellet, Poppy eventually has to leave the paper after removing a small article from the press to protect her fellow lodger, Myra, because it reveals she is secretly married to an army deserter. As she leaves the paper, Poppy agrees with Mr Pellet that "women were a nuisance in an office, anyway."

== Real life locations ==
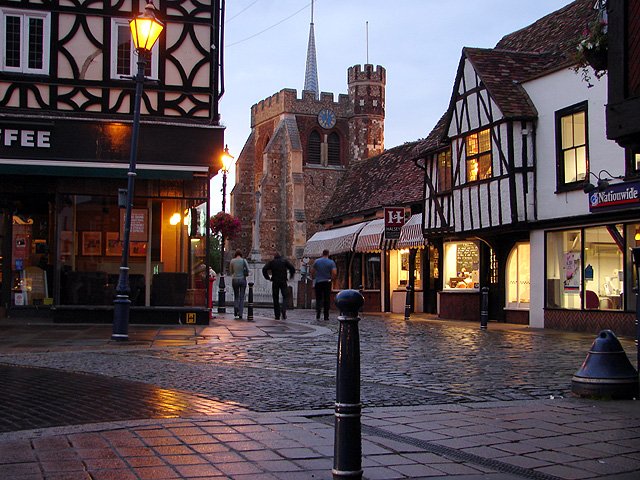
Corner of the Market Square in Hitchin showing the War Memorial

The book is set in the fictional town of Downingham, but in real life Dickens worked for the Hertfordshire Express in Hitchin in Hertfordshire. Dickens relates living in Bury Road in Downingham with a music school at the bottom of the road. In reality her lodgings were located in Highbury Road which still has the North Herts Music School at the end of the road.

The glass roofed shopping arcade, stepped war memorial and market square mentioned in the book can still be found in Hitchin. Nearby is the former Fairfield Hospital (now Fairfield) which appears as the Northgate Asylum in the book.

The real life editor of the Hertfordshire Express Ernest 'Hoddy' Hodson became Mr Pellet in the book.

== 2004 radio serial ==
In 2004 My Turn to Make the Tea was adapted as a four-part radio serial for BBC Radio 4; the book was adapted for radio by Sheila Goff and was directed by David Hunter. It featured Alice Hart as Poppy, Joanne Froggatt as Myra, Keith Barron as Mr Pellet, Stephen Critchlow as Victor and Annabelle Dowler as Maimie.
