= Dale Martindale =

- Born: Dale Martin Martindale; January 21, 1961 (age 65)
- Origin: Canada
- Genres: New wave
- Occupations: Singer
- Instruments: Vocalist
- Years active: 1982 - Present
- Labels: WEA; Quality records

Dale Martindale (born January 21, 1961), is a Canadian born vocalist best known as the lead singer for the new wave band Images in Vogue. In addition to his work with Images in vogue, Martindale has had several side projects, including 69 Duster and Primary, as well as Pretty Volume and numerous solo performances under his own name.

== Career ==
Martindale has been involved with many acts such as 69 Duster, Images in Vogue, Naked In The Garden, and Pretty Volume among others.

In 1986, Martindale and 16 other local artist were immortalized in a mural by artist Bill Wrigley titled "passing glances" on Toronto's Adelaide Street.

In 1986–1987, Martindale became the host of the Switchback (CBC) television show. In 1991, he and Joe Vizvary performed with Daryll Flint in a band called Primary.

In 2001, Martindale teamed up with Sean Kelly, Steve Nunnaro and Jay McBride to form 69 Duster. Together they released 2 albums; Mania and Ride and continued to perform together for over 8 years.

In 2007, Martindale composed music tracks for a Sprint advertisement campaign in which his vocals are lip synched by actor Dominic Keating who portrays Ian Westbury in the fictional band Fierce Blue Ascot although Dale does not appear in the music video.

The same year Martindale also collaborated with Montreal's Ky Anto (formerly of Robin Black and the Intergalactic Rock Stars ) and Toronto's Neil Leyton on their self-titled album Pretty Volume.

Dale currently resides and works in Toronto, Ontario, with his wife Susan.
