= Sean Kelly (Canadian musician) =

Canadian musician

- Origin: North Bay, Ontario, Canada
- Genres: Hard rock, pop, classical, world
- Occupation: Musician
- Instrument(s): Guitar, bass
- Website: seankellyguitar.com

Sean Kelly is a Canadian musician living in Toronto, currently playing guitar with Nelly Furtado, Coney Hatch and Lee Aaron. He founded the Toronto-based glam rock band Crash Kelly, and is the band's lead singer and guitarist. Kelly was a member of Canadian rock band Helix, playing bass guitar. He stayed with them for most of 2009 at which time joined Furtado's band on guitar. He is also guitarist for the Toronto rock group 69 Duster, which he co-founded with the ex-singer for Images in Vogue, Dale Martindale. He has done session guitar work for other bands as well, including Neil Leyton's 2003 album, Midnight Sun, and was a member of Jeff Pearce's band Rye. Kelly has also collaborated with Gilby Clarke, Rough Trade, Rudy Sarzo, Coney Hatch, and Canadian Brass.

== Career ==
Crash Kelly signed a multi-album deal with Liquor and Poker Music in 2004. They have toured internationally with Alice Cooper and Backyard Babies in the US and Quireboys and Enuff Z'Nuff in the UK.

The group name, Crash Kelly, is a reference to the nickname of an uncle, who acquired it as an AHL player hockey all over the northern states (including a long stint in Pennsylvania). "Crash" Kelly was known as a tough player, and an enforcer on the ice. The film Slap Shot was based loosely on the antics of this league. Sean's uncle's team the Johnstown Jets was said to have been an inspiration for some of the movie which was partly filmed on location in Johnstown, Pennsylvania. Crash Kelly have opened for artists such as The Black Crowes and Alice Cooper, and have had their songs featured on Bam Margera's MTV program Unholy Union.

Sean Kelly, as one of the producers of Crash Kelly's album Penny Pills, was a finalist for Best Album at the 2004 Northern Ontario Music and Film Awards.

He has received formal training in classical guitar from Eli Kassner, and has worked as a music teacher in the Toronto Catholic District School Board and received his Bachelor of Education degree from Nipissing University. His influences include classic Kiss, Cheap Trick, and T.Rex.

=== With Helix ===
In February 2009, Kelly joined London, Ontario based rock band Helix. Kelly joined as their new bass player, alongside original vocalist Brian Vollmer, and longtime guitarist Brent Doerner. Kelly co-wrote and co-produced the 2009 Helix album Vagabond Bones He stayed with Helix until fall 2009 when he joined Nelly Furtado on guitar for his first show in Mexico City. The departure was amicable according to Vollmer: "I give Sean my blessings, no worries. As long as we continue to write together, I am happy." Since departing Helix, Kelly has co-produced and played on their 2010 release, Smash Hits...Unplugged!.

=== With Nelly Furtado ===
Sean Kelly's first show with Furtado in Mexico was attended by 165,000 fans. It was followed by an appearance on The Tonight Show with Conan O'Brien in Los Angeles. Kelly then headed to Europe for a series of acoustic shows. He has continued to tour with Furtado through 2010.

== Discography ==
=== Solo ===
- 2007: The #1 Classical Guitar Album (Opening Day/Universal Music Group)
- 2008: Christmas Guitar (Opening Day/Universal Music Group)
- 2011: "Where the Wood Meets the Wire" (Opening Day/Universal Music Group)
- 2011: A Very Merry Christmas (with various artists) (Opening Day/Universal Music Group)

=== With Crash Kelly ===
- 2003: Penny Pills -(Bhurr Records (CA)/TB Records (UK)/Liquor and Poker Music (USA)/Spiritual Beast (Japan)
- 2003 "Waiting For An Alibi" Single – TB Records/BMG (UK)
- 2006: Electric Satisfaction – Bhurr Records CA/Liquor and Poker Music (USA)/Spiritual Beast (Japan)
- 2008: One More Heart Attack – Opening Day/Universal (CA), Warrior Records/Universal (USA), Spiritual Beast (Japan)
- 2008 "Love You Electric" – Bad Reputation (Europe)
- 2019 Touch Me (single) = Canadian Shield Music

=== With Helix ===
- 2009: Vagabond Bones
- 2010: Smash Hits...Unplugged!
- 2011: Skin in the Game EP
- 2012: R-O-C-K! Best of 1983–2012
- 2014: Bastard of the Blues
- 2016: Rock It Science
- 2018: ICON

=== With Nelly Furtado ===
- 2009: "Mas" Acoustic EP (Universal)
- 2010: "Walmart Soundcheck" (Interscope)
- 2012: "AOL Session" (Interscope)
- 2012: "Walmart Soundcheck" (Interscope)
- 2012: The Spirit Indestructible (deluxe edition) – (Interscope)
- 2016 Feel So Close -(Nelstar/E7)
- 2017: The Ride

=== With Lee Aaron ===
- 2016: Fire and Gasoline (Big Sister)
- 2018: Diamond Baby Blues (Metalville)
- 2019: Power, Soul, Rock N' Roll – Live in Germany (Metalville)

=== With Carole Pope ===
- 2011: Landfall (independent)

=== With Honeymoon Suite ===
- 2016: Hands Up EP (as songwriter)

=== With Metal On Ice ===
- 2013: Metal On Ice (Coalition Records/Warner Music Canada)

=== With Trapper ===
- 2015: Go For The Heart EP (independent)

=== Film music ===
- Randy Rhoads – The Quiet Riot Years' (Red Match Production)
- The Day Santa Didn't Come (BravoFACT)

== Bibliography ==
- Metal on Ice: Tales from Canada's Hard Rock and Heavy Metal Heroes (2013, Dundurn Press)
