= A Heavy Mental Christmas =

Studio album by Helix
- Released: October 21, 2008
- Genres: Christmas, Heavy metal
- Length: 25:29
- Labels: GBS, Universal
- Producer: Gord Prior

Helix chronology
The Power of Rock and Roll (2007)	A Heavy Mental Christmas (2008)	Vagabond Bones (2009)

A Heavy Mental Christmas is a CD released by heavy metal band Helix in 2008. It is Helix' 11th full-length studio album and 20th album released overall. It is a Christmas album featuring both standards and original music. It was released in Walmart stores in Canada in October 2008 through Universal Music and GBS Records.

== Track listing ==
1. "Rudolph the Red Nosed Reindeer" (Johnny Marks)
2. "Rockin' Around the Christmas Tree" (Johnny Marks)
3. "Santa Claus Is Back in Town" (Jerry Leiber), (Mike Stoller)
4. A Wonderful Christmas Time (Paul McCartney)
5. "Jingle Bell Rock" (Joe Beal, Jim Boothe)
6. "Happy Xmas (War Is Over)" (John Lennon), (Yoko Ono)
7. "Sock It to Me Santa" (Bob Seger)
8. "Jingle Bells" (James Lord Pierpont)
9. "Silent Night" (Franz Xaver Gruber), (Joseph Mohr)
10. "Christmas Time Is Here Again" *
- Original song written by Steve Georgakopoulos, Gord Prior, and Brian Vollmer

== Credits ==
Produced and arranged by Gord Prior
Co-produced by Brian Vollmer, Steve Georgakopoulos and Aaron Murray
Recorded and mixed by Aaron Murray

Recorded and mixed between August 7 and 27, 2008 at The A Room in London, Ontario.
Mastered at Sterling Sound, New York.

=== Helix members ===
- Brian Vollmer – lead vocals
- Rick VanDyk – lead guitar
- Jim Lawson – lead guitar
- Brent "Ned" Niemi – drums
- Paul Fonseca – bass guitar

This was the current Helix lineup listed and pictured on the CD packaging, but not the musicians who were credited with recording the CD.

=== Musicians ===
- Brian Vollmer – lead vocals
- Steve Georgakopoulos – all rhythm guitars, lead guitar
- Gord Prior – back up vocals, arrangements, tambourines and jingle bells
- Brent "Ned" Neimi – drums and backup vocals
- Paul Fonseca – bass and backup vocals
- Rick VanDyk – lead guitar and backup vocals
- Aaron Murray – keyboards on "Sock It To Me Santa"
- Doug Weir – backup vocals
