= John Brass (writer) =

English clergyman, classicist and educational writer

John Brass or Brasse (1790-1833), was an English clergyman, classicist and educational writer. He spelt his name Brass in early life, and Brasse in later years.

Brass was educated at Trinity College, Cambridge, where he obtained a fellowship in 1811. He graduated B.A. as sixth wrangler in the same year, proceeded M.A. in 1814, B.D. in 1824, and D.D. in 1829. He was presented by his college to the living of St Mary's church in Stotfold, Bedfordshire in 1824, which he held till his death, in 1833.

He edited Euclid's Elements of Geometry, London, 1825(?), and the Œdipus Rex (1829 and 1834), the Œdipus Coloneus (1829), the Trachiniæ (1830), and the Antigone (1830) of Sophocles. He published a Greek Gradus in 1828, which was reissued, in two volumes, at Göttingen, under the editorship of C. F. G. Siedhof, in 1839-40, and in England in 1847, under the editorship of the Rev. F. E. J. Valpy.

The politician Matthew Talbot Baines was a friend and executor.
