= Vagabond Bones =

Studio album by Helix
- Released: November 17, 2009
- Genre: Heavy metal
- Label: Universal
- Producer: Aaron Murray, Sean Kelly and Brian Vollmer

Helix chronology
A Heavy Mental Christmas (2008)	Vagabond Bones (2009)	Smash Hits...Unplugged! (2010)

Vagabond Bones is a studio album by heavy metal band Helix, released on November 17, 2009. It is Helix' 12th full-length studio album and 21st album released overall. It contains performances from members of the 1980s Helix lineup: Brian Vollmer, Brent Doerner, Daryl Gray and Greg Hinz, as well as former member and co-producer Sean Kelly. Kelly departed Helix during the production of Vagabond Bones, prompting the reunion of the 1980s band. Kelly remained on hand to finish the record before leaving to tour with Nelly Furtado.

During the early stages of recording, frontman Brian Vollmer reunited the surviving members of the No Rest for the Wicked lineup (Brent Doerner, Mike Uzelac, and Greg Hinz) to record a new version of the AC/DC classic "It's a Long Way to the Top", to be included as a bonus track. The track was dropped, and it appears unlikely that it will ever be released for legal reasons. The CD was originally to be titled It’s Rock Science, NOT Rocket Science!, before being changed to Vagabond Bones after one of the songs on the album.

== Track listing ==
All songs written by Brian Vollmer, Sean Kelly and Moe Berg except where noted.

1. The Animal Inside (Won’t Be Denied)
2. Go Hard or Go Home (Vollmer, Kelly)
3. Vagabond Bones
4. Monday Morning Meltdown
5. When the Bitter's Got the Better of You (Vollmer, Kelly)
6. Hung Over But Still Hanging In (duet with Russ Graham of Killer Dwarfs)
7. Best Mistake I Never Made (Vollmer, Kelly)
8. Make 'Em Dance (Vollmer, Gord Prior, Steve Georgakopoulos, Kelly)
9. Jack It Up (Vollmer, Kelly, McConnell)

=== Unreleased tracks ===
1. It's a Long Way to the Top (AC/DC cover featuring Brent Doerner, Greg Hinz and Mike Uzelac)

== Reception ==
Professional ratings
Review scores
Source	Rating
Classic Rock Magazine	8/10 stars

The Waterloo Record called the album "...a sizzling collection of new tunes which rank among the band’s best." Classic Rock Magazine said that "Vagabond Bones rocks hard, but never forgets the value of a memorable chorus."

== Credits ==
Produced by Aaron Murray, Sean Kelly and Brian Vollmer, except "Make 'Em Dance" produced by Gord Prior, Murray, Kelly, Vollmer.
Recorded at Pocket Studios, Toronto Ontario

=== Helix live band members ===
- Brian Vollmer – lead vocals
- Brent "The Doctor" Doerner – lead guitar
- Kaleb "Duckman" Duck – lead guitar
- Greg "Fritz" Hinz – drums
- Daryl Gray – bass guitar

=== CD Musicians ===
- Brian Vollmer – vocals
- Sean Kelly – guitar, bass, background vocals
- Brent "The Doctor" Doerner – guitar, background vocals
- Steve Georgakopoulos – guitar
- Brent "Ned" Niemi – drums
- Rob MacEachern – drums
- Greg "Fritz" Hinz – drums
- Daryl Gray – bass, background vocals
- Cheryl Lescom – vocals

== Music videos ==
- "Vagabond Bones"
- "Hung Over But Still Hanging In" (alternate version without duet)
- "Make 'Em Dance"
- "Monday Morning Meltdown"

"Make 'Em Dance" was produced by Brent Doerner and Red Dust Films. The video was directed by Francis Coral Mellon and edited by Matt Robertshaw. This was the first new video to feature Hinz, Gray and Doerner in over 20 years. Kaleb Duck also appears.

"Monday Morning Meltdown" was produced and edited by Brent Doerner, and directed by Francis Coral Mellon for Red Dust Films.
