= Switchback (TV series) =

Canadian television series

Switchback is a Canadian television program for children and teenagers, created by Nijole Kuzmickas, that aired on STV which later became Global in the 1980s. An interactive youth variety show that aired on Sunday mornings, the series mixed music videos, celebrity interviews, cartoons, comedy and puppetry segments, and viewer contests.

The show was produced in several Canadian cities simultaneously, sharing some segments but each featuring their own local hosts and predominantly local content. Editions of the series were produced in Vancouver, Winnipeg, Regina, Halifax, Calgary, Ottawa and Toronto, with each also seen on some other CBC stations that did not produce their own Switchback.

Hosts of the show included Rick Scott, Gordon White, Bob Geldof, Richard Newman, Andrew Cochrane and Stu Jeffries in Vancouver; Stan Johnson in Halifax; Shawn Thompson, Howard Busgang, Dale Martindale and Eric Tunney in Toronto; Laurie Mustard and Jim Ingebritsen in Winnipeg; Howard Glassman, Ian MacGillvray and Keith Sandulak in Calgary; Brigitte Robinson, Tom New, Johnson Moretti, Natalie Gray, Terry Dimonte and Don Westwood in Ottawa; and Bill Wright in Regina.

The Toronto, Winnipeg and Calgary editions of the series were cancelled in 1988, with viewers in those areas receiving one of the remaining editions thereafter. At the same time, the Halifax edition went through some controversy when it dismissed its longtime host Stan Johnson.

All of the remaining editions of the program were cancelled in early 1990, amid budget cuts at the CBC.
