= Certifiably Jonathan =

- Film poster
- Directed by: Jim Pasternak
- Written by: Jim Pasternak
- Produced by: Richard Marshall
- Starring: Jonathan Winters
- Cinematography: Richard Marshall
- Edited by: Richard Marshall; Robert Pergament
- Music by: Buddy Judge
- Distributed by: Area 23a
- Release dates: March 2007 (Aspen Comedy Arts Festival); February 11, 2011
- Running time: 79 minutes 80 minutes 88 minutes
- Country: United States
- Language: English

Certifiably Jonathan is a 2007 American mockumentary film directed by Jim Pasternak and starring Jonathan Winters.

== Participants ==
In addition to Winters, the following people appear in the mockumentary:

- Robin Williams
- Howie Mandel
- Nora Dunn
- Jim Carrey
- Sarah Silverman
- Tim Conway
- Jeffrey Tambor
- Jimmy Kimmel
- Robert Klein
- Ryan Stiles
- Rob Reiner
- Kevin Dunn
- David Arquette
- Patricia Arquette
- Rosanna Arquette
- Dominic Keating
- Nikita Ager
- Lucinda Winters
- Jim Pasternak
- Gary Owens

== Reception ==
The film has a 25% rating on Rotten Tomatoes. Roger Ebert awarded the film one star. Nathan Rabin of The A.V. Club graded the film a C−. Joseph Jon Lanthier of Slant Magazine awarded the film three stars out of four.

Ronnie Scheib of Variety gave the film a negative review and wrote, "Winters deserves better."

Frank Scheck of The Hollywood Reporter also gave the film a negative review and wrote, "Faux documentary about the legendary comedian squanders the rich potential of its subject."

== Accolade ==
The film won the Best Feel Good Feature Film award at the 2008 Feel Good Film Festival.
