= Mariana (Dickens novel) =

1940 novel by Monica Dickens

First edition (publ. Michael Joseph)

Mariana (1940) is the first novel by Monica Dickens. Mariana is a coming of age novel, which describes the growth and experience of Mary Shannon, a young English girl in the 1930s as the first hints of war begin to permeate English domestic life. First published by Michael Joseph, it was reprinted by Persephone Books in 1999 and is the second in their collection.

The title is a reference to the poem of the same name by Alfred, Lord Tennyson

== Plot outline ==
The novel starts with an adult Mary spending a weekend in an |isolated cottage on the Essex marshes during World War II. She hears on the radio that her husband's ship has been sunk with many lives lost. Her phone line is dead and it is too late to travel back to her home in London during the night, where she dreads a telegram may be waiting so she resolves to leave first thing the following morning. She thinks back over her life and the following events which lead up to her present crisis.

As a child Mary attended school on Cromwell Road, Kensington, living with her mother and Uncle Geoffrey, an actor in a flat near Olympia, West Kensington, her father having been killed at Thiepval in 1916. But it was her holidays spent at her paternal grandparents' house near Taunton in Somerset for which she had her fondest and most vivid memories. Especially of her cousin Denys, studying at Eton, who was her first love until he disappears with another girl at his first Oxford college ball.

Her mother having moved to a house near Sloane Square, Mary then spends a year at a Drama College but she soon releases that she was not destined to be an actress and her time ends with disaster at the Summer examinations when she turns her performance into burlesque and is asked to leave.

Paris is her next destination where she takes a course in dress design with the aim of helping at her mother's dress shop on South Molton Street. She falls in love with Pierre, the wealthy son of a bank director. They get engaged but Mary later breaks it off.

After completing her course Mary returns to London and works with her mother. While chauffeuring for one of the shop's best customers she meets Sam, an architect and falls in love again, this time leading to marriage.

Returning to the present, the next day Mary takes a bus to a post-office where there is a working phone to call London and discover whether her husband is still alive. She is told that a man was frantically trying to reach her the previous evening. The man had been using the expression, 'For the love of mud', one of Sam's favorite phrases, thereby revealing that he is still alive. The novel immediately ends without noting Mary's reaction.

== Inspiration ==
The novel has been described as a semi-autobiography, for example Dickens was kicked out of Drama School "for not being able to act".
