= Stotfold Mill =

Watermill in Bedfordshire, England

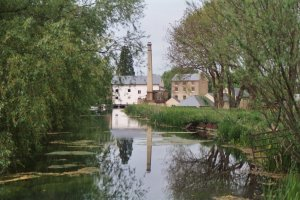
- Stotfold Mill restored after the 1992 fire

- Location within Bedfordshire
- 52°00′57″N 0°13′10″W
- Type: Watermill
- Location: Stotfold, Bedfordshire
- OS grid reference: TL2228836754

History
- Built: 18th Century

Site notes
- Owner: National Trust

Listed Building – Grade II
- Official name: Stotfold Mill
- Designated: 7 Jun 1974
- Reference no.: 1113870

Stotfold Mill, formerly Randall’s Mill, is a Grade-II listed watermill in Bedfordshire and it is on the River Ivel.

== Mill Fire ==
On 15 December 1992, Stotfold Mill was destroyed by a fire, the Stotfold Mill Preservation Trust subsequently rebuilt the watermill. Restoration was completed in April 2006 and the mill returned to operation after a 40 year hiatus.

== Architecture ==
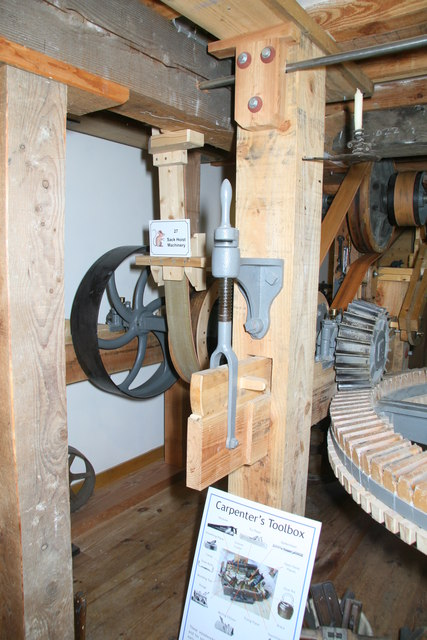
Machinery of Stotfold Mill

Stotfold Mill, a Grade-II listed building, had the widest waterwheel in the UK at a width of 14 ft (4.3 m). It is recorded as an early 19th-century structure of gault bricks, with additions and alterations made in the late 19th-century. The earlier parts of the building have weatherboarding to the upper floors.
