= Kevin Gentle =

English cricketer (born 1959)

Personal information
- Full name: Kevin Gentle
- Born: 31 October 1959 (age 67); Stotfold, Bedfordshire
- Batting: Left-handed

Domestic team information
- Years: Team
- 1979–1993: Bedfordshire

Career statistics
Competition	List A
Matches	1
Runs scored	13
Batting average	13.00
100s/50s	0/0
Top score	13
Catches/stumpings	0/–
- Source: Cricinfo, 2 August 2011

Kevin Gentle (born 31 October 1959) is a former English cricketer. Gentle was a left-handed batsman. He was born in Stotfold, Bedfordshire.

Gentle made his debut for Bedfordshire against Suffolk in the 1979 Minor Counties Championship. He played Minor counties cricket for Bedfordshire from 1979 to 1993, making 74 Minor Counties Championship appearances and 14 MCCA Knockout Trophy appearances. He made his only List A appearance against Gloucestershire in the 1985 NatWest Trophy. Opening the batting, he was dismissed stumped by Jack Russell off the bowling of Ian Payn for 13 runs. Bedfordshire lost the match by 141 runs.
