= Bedford Lunatic Asylum =

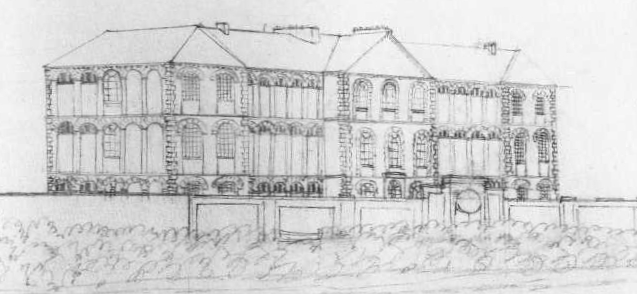
- 1820 Drawing of the Asylum by Thomas Fisher

- Location within Bedfordshire

Geography
- Location: Bedford, United Kingdom
- Coordinates: 52.121°N 0.471°W

Organisation
- Type: Psychiatric hospital

Services
- Emergency department: No Accident & Emergency

History
- Founded: 1812
- Closed: 1860

Links
- Lists: Hospitals in the United Kingdom

The Bedford Lunatic Asylum was a mental health facility. It opened in 1812 and closed in 1860.

== History ==
Samuel Whitbread headed the committee which commissioned the asylum. The Bedford Lunatic Asylum, designed by John Wing, was opened in April 1812. In 1845, the UK parliament passed a new act requiring that counties either build their own asylums or operate an asylum jointly with another county. Many other counties did not build asylums like Bedford, so there were now twice as many inmates in the asylum and not enough staff to help with their needs. Bedford's neighbouring counties, Hertfordshire and Huntingdonshire, then sent patients to Bedford. In 1860 the three counties combined asylums in Fairfield Hospital near Arlesey and the Bedford Lunatic Asylum closed soon after.

== Renovation ==
The site of the asylum is now a residential building. The bodies of patients that died at the hospital are now buried underneath the children's playground.

== See also ==
- Healthcare in Bedfordshire
