= Images in Vogue =

Canadian new wave band

- Origin: Vancouver, British Columbia, Canada
- Genres: New wave; synth-pop
- Years active: 1980–1991; 2018–present; (one-off reunions: 2002, 2004, 2012)
- Labels: WEA Canada; Quality Records
- Members: Dale Martindale; Joe Vizvary; Derrick Gyles; Glen Nelson
- Past members: Don Gordon; Gary Smith; Kevin Crompton; Ed Shaw; Tim Welch
- Website: imagesinvogue.ca

Images in Vogue is a Canadian new wave group formed in 1981 in Vancouver. It originally consisted of vocalist Dale Martindale, guitarist Don Gordon (later of Numb), synth players Joe Vizvary and Glen Nelson, bassist Gary Smith, and percussionist Kevin Crompton (better known as cEvin Key, later of Skinny Puppy). The band's manager was Kim Clarke Champniss, who later became a MuchMusic VJ.

== History ==
=== 1980–1991: formation and Canadian popularity ===
Images in Vogue formed in 1980 during the new wave period; synth player Joe Vizvary was inspired by groups such as OMD, the Human League, Simple Minds and the Cure. The band released four EPs before their full-length debut, 1985's In the House. Their first notable chart hit was "Lust for Love", from the 1983 self-titled EP. The EP reached No. 97 on the Canadian albums chart. Gordon left the band in 1984, and was replaced by Ed Shaw.

Their debut album, 1985's In the House, reached No. 85 on the Canadian albums chart. IIV was recognized for their hard work with a Juno Award nomination for Most Promising Group in November 1985. Their song "In the House" won the 1986 CASBY Award for Single of the Year, with the band named Group of the Year.

Crompton left Images in Vogue in 1986, indicating that the band's "new romantic" sound was too commercial for his tastes, and concentrated on his side project Skinny Puppy. Crompton was replaced by Derrick Gyles. Nelson also left the same year, and was replaced by Tim Welch. In 1987, IIV won 2 more Casby awards and won Group of the year

The band briefly considered changing its name to The Spell while recording its 1988 album, but discovered that an Australian band was already using that name. The album—but not the band—ended up titled as The Spell, although there was still confusion as the band name "Images In Vogue" did not appear on the LP label or the front cover. (The band name "Images In Vogue" did appear on the spine—and very quickly, to combat the confusion, a sticker was added to the front cover with the words "Images In Vogue" prominently displayed.)

The Spell album was not commercially successful, however, and by June 1988, Images in Vogue could no longer count on the support of its record label. This, combined with the band's internal conflicts, influenced Gary Smith to leave the band. Images in Vogue's final concert featuring original content was at Toronto's Opera House in November 1991, after which the band unofficially split as members pursued different ventures.

=== 1994: Best of Collection ===
In 1994 the band released their first compilation album titled, Best of Collection, on SPG Music Ltd. The collection featured their greatest hits, extended versions and an orchestral version of "Lust for Love". The selections were culled from recordings made between March 1982–October 1984.

=== 2002–2010: live performances, compilation albums and Being Erica ===
Since breaking up in 1991, the band has continued to release various compilation CDs featuring remixes and live, rare, and unreleased songs; additionally, rare, commercially unreleased tracks are made available for download by the band at its website.

Images in Vogue reunited for gigs at Toronto's Opera House in 2002 and at Vancouver's Commodore Ballroom in 2004, and again in Toronto in 2012 as a special guest opening act for Spoons at their 30th anniversary show for their Arias & Symphonies album.

The song "Lust for Love" was featured in a 2009 episode of the Canadian comedy-drama television series, Being Erica. The penultimate episode of the first season, entitled "Erica the Vampire Slayer", features Erica traveling back in time to 2001 to attend a vampire-themed role play party.

Their 2010 compilation album, Prototypes contains demo tracks and alternate recordings.

=== 2017: Incipience vinyl box set ===
In 2017, the band released a 4 LP coloured vinyl box set, Incipience. The collection includes, Incipience 1: Studio Tracks 1981-1982, Incipience 2: Prerelease - Educated Man, Incipience 3: Extended Play Redux and Incipience 4: Live at LuvAFair October 6th, 1982. Limited to 200 copies this set collects some of Images in Vogue's earliest recordings, and represents the group's initial, possibly most famous line-up of Dale Martindale, Joe Vizvary, Glen Nelson, Gary Smith, Kevin Crompton, and Don Gordon.

The set includes the band's long-lost first unreleased album; unreleased demos; the band's first, now rare EPs; the self-titled Images in Vogue EP, including b-sides and rarities; and an unreleased 1982 live performance at Vancouver's famous Luv-A-Fair club. The limited box set includes limited colour vinyl LPs, download cards, and a bonus insert, all collected in a unique box designed by the band. The vinyl versions are available for individual sale while the 4th vinyl, Incipience 4: Live at LuvAFair October 6th, 1982, was also released individually on CD with bonus tracks. All of the tracks on the box set are available for individual download online.

The first vinyl, Incipience 1: Studio Tracks 1981-1982, features the group's earliest demos, as well as the long-lost, unreleased first album. These tracks represent the first-ever studio recordings by Kevin Crompton, as well as of vocalist Dale Martindale and were recorded in 1981 and 1982 in Vancouver, Canada's Bullfrog, Water Street, and Mushroom Studios.

The second vinyl, Incipience 2: Prerelease - Educated Man, collects Pre-Release, originally released with 500 copies in June 1982 and Educated Man, originally released with 1,000 copies in October 1982. These were the first vinyl releases by the group, as well as the first appearances on vinyl from Dale Martindale (vocals), Joe Vizvary (synths), Kevin Crompton, and Don Gordon.

The third vinyl, Incipience 3: Extended Play Redux features the band's first major label release from October 1983. The self-titled record features the top 30 single "Lust for Love", and this re-release also includes remixes and b-sides from the "Lust for Love" and "Just Like You" 7” singles. The recordings were produced by Joe Vizvary and Lindsay Kidd, with assistance by Dave Ogilvie in Vancouver's Mushroom and Little Mountain Studios. The tracks have been remastered and the sleeve includes enhanced artwork.

The fourth vinyl, Incipience 4: Live at LuvAFair October 6th, 1982, features a 35-year-old live performance at the Vancouver club, Luv-A-Fair. Recorded live on October 6, 1982, the vinyl includes an unreleased recording of Images in Vogue's 12th live performance. The concert was the premiere performance of the band's hit, "Lust for Love", as well as the live debut of then-new member Glen Nelson. Live personnel include Joe Vizvary, Gary Blair Smith, Dale Martindale, Don Gordon, and Kevin Crompton. The tracks were mastered for vinyl and the CD version includes 6 bonus live tracks.

=== 2018–present: reunion ===
Since 2018, Images in Vogue has returned to performing occasionally at various events around Canada.

In May 2020, cEvin Key hosted a live video chat on YouTube with the original 6 members of Images in Vogue. Joining Key were Joe Vizvary, Dale Martindale, Gary Smith, Don Gordon, and Glen Nelson. It was the first such reunion of the original band members in 35 years.

== Discography ==
=== Studio albums ===
- In the House (1985) (#85 Canada(5 weeks))
- The Spell (1988)

=== Live albums ===
- Incipience 4: Live at LuvAFair October 6, 1982 (2017)

=== Compilation albums ===
- Best of Collection (1994)
- Collection Version 2.0 : Chronology (2004)
- Collection Version 3.0 : Evolution (2006)
- Prototypes (2010)
- Incipience 1: Studio Tracks 1981-1982 (2017)
- Incipience 2: Prerelease - Educated Man (2017)
- Incipience 3: Extended Play Redux (2017)

=== Box sets ===
- Incipience (2017)

=== Extended plays ===
- Pre-Release (1982)
- Educated Man (1982)
- Images in Vogue (1983) (#97 Canada (4 weeks))
- Rituals (1984)

=== Singles ===
- "Lust for Love" (1983)
- "Just Like You" (1984)
- "Rescue Me" (1984)
- "Call It Love" (1985)
- "Save It" (1985)
- "In the House" (1985/1986)
- "So Careful" (1988)
- "Strangers" (1988)
- "Look Me In the Eye" (2004)
