= Fairfield, Bedfordshire =

Village and civil parish in Central Bedfordshire, England

Coordinates: 51.998°N 0.2475°W

Fairfield
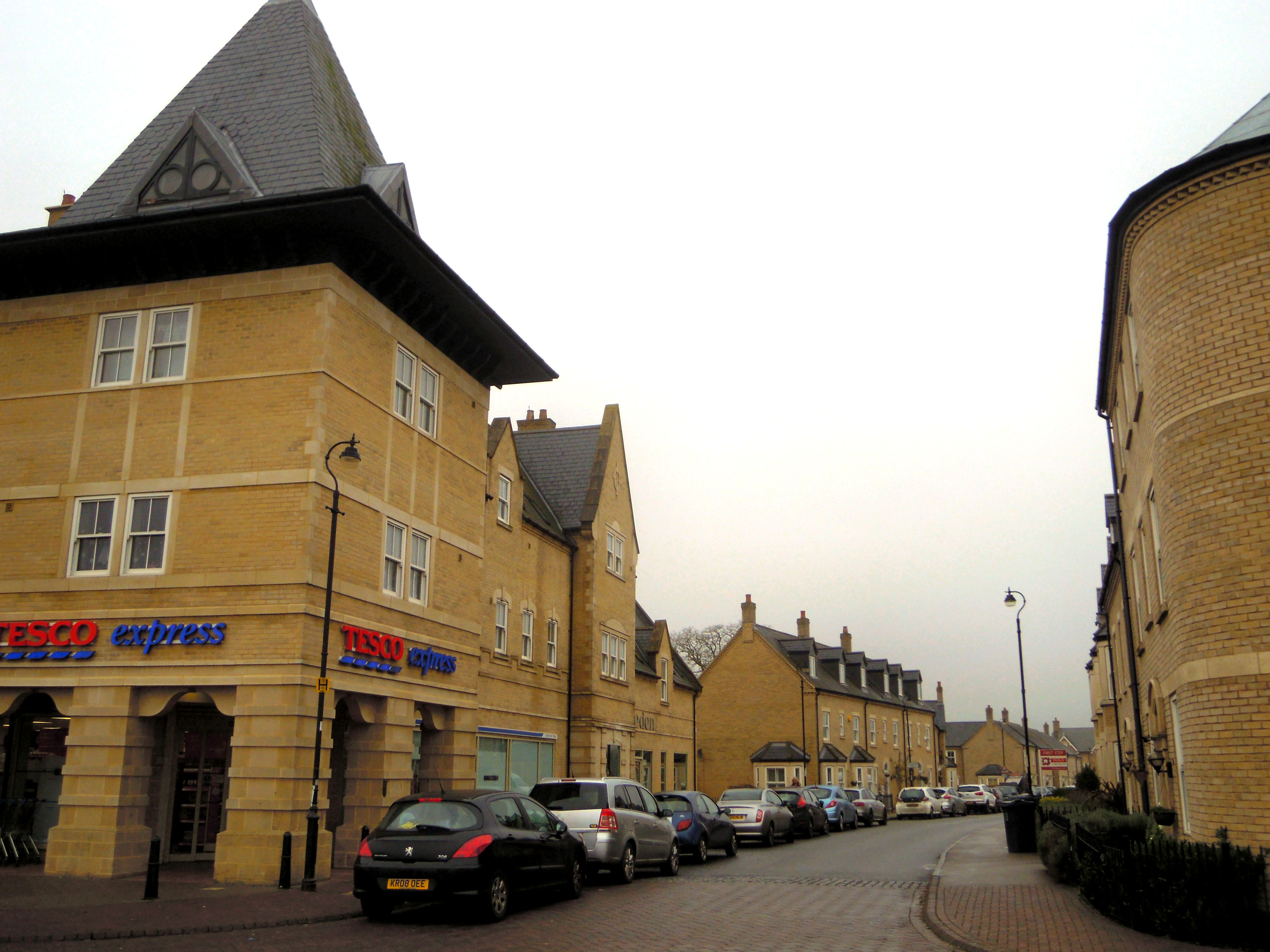
- The centre of Fairfield

- Location within Bedfordshire
- Population: 3,405 (2021 census)
- OS grid reference: TL204347
- Civil parish: Fairfield
- Unitary authority: Central Bedfordshire
- Ceremonial county: Bedfordshire
- Region: East
- Country: England
- Sovereign state: United Kingdom
- Post town: HITCHIN
- Dialling code: 01462
- Police: Bedfordshire
- Fire: Bedfordshire
- Ambulance: East of England
- UK Parliament: Hitchin
- Website: Fairfield Parish Council

Fairfield (originally known as Fairfield Park) is a village and civil parish in the Central Bedfordshire district of Bedfordshire, England. It lies on a hilltop to the south of Stotfold and east of Arlesey.

The village was developed from the early 2000s on the site of Fairfield Hospital, formerly the Three Counties Asylum, which opened in 1860 and closed in 1999. The main hospital building, its church and its isolation hospital are all Grade II listed, and the former hospital now forms the centre of the village. Excavations before the redevelopment found remains of late Bronze Age and Iron Age settlement on the hilltop. Fairfield was part of the parish of Stotfold until 1 April 2013, when it became a civil parish in its own right.

== History ==
=== Prehistory ===
In 2002–2003 Oxford Archaeology excavated two areas within the grounds of the former hospital ahead of redevelopment. The earliest features were of late Bronze Age date and included a large enclosure with an adjacent group of pits, together with three cremation burials. After a possible break in occupation, substantial settlements were laid out at both excavated sites in the latter part of the early Iron Age, around the 5th to 4th centuries BC, with roundhouses, four-post structures and many storage pits. Human remains from the Iron Age settlement included two children buried in storage pits, one a crouched burial of a child aged about 10 to 13, together with the bones of a newborn infant and scattered human bone, among them a worked human thigh bone. Finds included early quern-stones and 49 bone weaving tools. Occupation continued on a limited scale into the middle Iron Age, after which the hilltop was used for agriculture. The excavation was one of the first large-scale modern investigations of early Iron Age settlement in the region.

=== Three Counties Asylum ===
The Three Counties Asylum was built to replace the Bedford Lunatic Asylum and to provide accommodation for 600 patients from Bedfordshire, Hertfordshire and Huntingdonshire. The site, on agricultural land at the boundary of the parishes of Stotfold and Arlesey, was chosen in 1856. The asylum was designed by George Fowler Jones of York, advised by the medical superintendent of the North and East Ridings Asylum in Yorkshire, and built by William Webster of Boston, Lincolnshire. It is of yellow brick with red brick patterning and slate roofs, on a symmetrical corridor plan, and was extended by the same architect in 1868–70 and 1877–81. The clay for its bricks came from the nearby Arlesey pits.

The buildings were ready by 19 March 1860, and during April that year 308 patients were transferred from Bedford to the new asylum by railway. The asylum was formally opened on 18 June 1860. Although it lay within Stotfold parish, much of its traffic, including a tramway and a station on the main railway line, reached the site from Arlesey, and its postal address was for many years "Stotfold, Arlesey". As a result, the hospital has often been wrongly described as being in Arlesey. It was a large local employer: many nursing and administrative staff came from further afield, but farm and domestic staff were drawn from Arlesey and Stotfold. The hospital had its own farm and recreational facilities, as well as its own laundry, railway station and fire brigade.

A church for the hospital, in the Early English style, was built in 1878–79 to designs by Fowler Jones, and an Italianate isolation hospital by the same architect was built in 1878. An east window was added to the church in 1920 in memory of staff and patients who died in the First World War, during and after which the hospital treated patients with shell shock. A cemetery for patients was laid out at the same time as the church. The cemetery contains the war grave of Sergeant Antoni Gajewski of the Polish Air Force, who died at the hospital in January 1941.

=== Three Counties Hospital and Fairfield Hospital ===
In 1927 the asylum was renamed the Three Counties Hospital. At its peak in 1936 it had 1,100 patients, and its grounds had grown to 410 acres. During the Second World War a hutted emergency hospital was built on the site to take patients evacuated from London hospitals, notably the Royal Free Hospital. In August 1943 Muriel Emery, a 21-year-old nurse at this Fairfield Emergency Hospital, was murdered in the grounds; a local labourer was later found guilty but insane. After the war the huts housed the London Chest Hospital from 1947 into the 1950s. The hospital became part of the National Health Service in 1948, under the North West Metropolitan Regional Hospital Board, and was renamed Fairfield Hospital in the 1960s. In May 1958 Veronica Ryan, a 28-year-old ward orderly at the hospital, was murdered beside Hitchin Road near the hospital as she returned by bicycle from Letchworth. A former voluntary patient was found guilty but insane at Bedfordshire Assizes in October 1958 and ordered to be detained.

The hospital closed in 1999 and the site was sold for redevelopment. Bedfordshire Archives holds extensive records of the hospital's site, administration, patients and staff from 1856 to 1998 under the reference LF, some of which are subject to access restrictions.

=== Redevelopment ===
The redevelopment of the hospital site was initially planned for 900 houses and 100 apartments. In February 2002 Mid Bedfordshire District Council granted full planning permission to convert the main hospital building into 101 flats with leisure uses. The converted building is known as Fairfield Hall. The hospital's former outbuildings and farmhouse were also converted to housing, named Middlemarch. The new housing around them, built between 2004 and 2012 to fund the restoration, was designed to keep the Victorian character of the streets and the site's mature woodland. Further development continues: Central Bedfordshire Council forecast a further 105 dwellings in the parish by March 2030.

=== A new parish ===
Fairfield was originally intended to become a village in its own right, but for its first years it remained part of the parish of Stotfold. Following a petition from the Fairfield Community Action Group, Central Bedfordshire Council carried out a community governance review of the area. On 14 June 2012 the council resolved to make a reorganisation order under section 86 of the Local Government and Public Involvement in Health Act 2007, creating a parish of Fairfield with its own parish council. The new parish came into being on 1 April 2013, and the first parish council was elected in May 2013.

=== Recent events ===
In November 2023 Annette Smith, aged 74, was murdered at her flat in Fairfield Hall by her lodger and carer, Scott Paterson, who concealed her death for several months. He pleaded guilty, and in November 2024 he was sentenced at Luton Crown Court to life imprisonment with a minimum term of 19 years and 178 days. The police investigation was the subject of a two-part special of the Channel 4 series 24 Hours in Police Custody, broadcast on 29 and 30 June 2025.

== Geography ==
The aurora over the Fairfield Gardens development, 10 May 2024

The parish covers the former hospital site and its grounds, extending west to the parish boundary with Arlesey and the line of the Pix Brook. It adjoins the parishes of Arlesey and Stotfold. The village stands on a prominent hilltop, south of Stotfold and north of Letchworth Garden City.

== Governance ==
Fairfield Parish Council has seven members, elected every four years. The parish is not divided into wards. In May 2025 it had an electorate of 2,391. Central Bedfordshire Council's 2025 community governance review recommended keeping the parish name and the council's size unchanged. The parish council has prepared a neighbourhood plan for the period 2016 to 2026.

For elections to Central Bedfordshire Council, Fairfield forms part of the Arlesey and Fairfield ward.

Before the 2024 general election, Fairfield was in the North East Bedfordshire constituency. Following the 2023 review of Westminster constituencies it is in the Hitchin constituency. Its MP is Alistair Strathern (Labour).

== Demography ==
The parish had a population of 3,405 at the 2021 census, compared with 2,682 for the same area in 2011.

== Landmarks ==
Three buildings in the parish are listed at Grade II, all associated with the former hospital:

- Fairfield Hospital (now Fairfield Hall), the main asylum building of 1856–60 with later extensions, listed in 1985
- the former hospital church of 1878–79, listed in 1997
- the former isolation hospital of 1878, listed in 1997

== Education ==
Fairfield Park Lower School opened on Dickens Boulevard in September 2007. A pre-school was added in 2009, the school was extended in 2013, and a second site opened on Ruskin Drive in 2018.

== Amenities ==
Amenities in the village include a community centre, a bowls club, a cricket club, a Bannatyne health club, the Pavilion Café, children's play areas, a hair salon, a nursery school and a Tesco Express. The cricket and bowls clubs use grounds that were originally the hospital's recreational facilities, and the West and East Orchards, which once supplied the hospital, are county wildlife sites. Fairfield Community Church, an independent church affiliated to the Baptist Union, meets in the community hall.
