= Ian Westbury =

Ian Westbury is a fictional British musician, portrayed by Dominic Keating, a British actor. He was created as part of an advertising campaign for the relaunch of Sprint's music store in 2007.

As the former lead singer of Fierce Blue Ascot, which had one top-10 hit in the 1980s, Ian acts as a guide – the "Mix Sherpa" – to Sprint's music store. Long-retired from performing, he is portrayed as running a record store on Melrose in Los Angeles, California.
