= Sherlock Holmes (2010 film) =

2010 film by Rachel Lee Goldenberg

Sir Arthur Conan Doyle's Sherlock Holmes
- Film poster
- Directed by: Rachel Lee Goldenberg
- Screenplay by: Paul Bales; Stephen Fiske
- Based on: Characters created by Sir Arthur Conan Doyle
- Produced by: Martin Flores; David Rimawi; Paul Bales; Stephen Fiske
- Starring: Gareth David-Lloyd; Ben Syder; Dominic Keating
- Narrated by: David Shackleton
- Cinematography: Adam Silver
- Edited by: Rachel Lee Goldenberg
- Music by: Chris Ridenhour
- Production company: The Asylum
- Distributed by: The Asylum Home Entertainment (United States); Revolver Entertainment (United Kingdom)
- Release date: January 26, 2010
- Running time: 85 minutes
- Countries: United States; United Kingdom
- Language: English
- Budget: $1 million

Sir Arthur Conan Doyle's Sherlock Holmes is a 2010 American steampunk mystery film directed by Rachel Lee Goldenberg and produced by independent American film studio The Asylum. It features the Sherlock Holmes characters created by Sir Arthur Conan Doyle, though it follows an original plot. In the film, eccentric detective Holmes and his companion Dr. Watson investigate the trail of destruction left by the supervillain Spring-Heeled Jack. Gareth David-Lloyd plays Dr. Watson and Ben Syder, making his film debut, plays Sherlock Holmes.

The film is a direct-to-DVD mockbuster intended to capitalize upon the Warner Brothers film of the same name directed by Guy Ritchie, and is the second film by The Asylum to be inspired by the writings of Arthur Conan Doyle, the first being King of the Lost World. The film was shot primarily in Caernarfon, Wales on a low budget. The Asylum had previously used the same locations to film Merlin and the War of the Dragons.

== Plot ==
On December 29, 1940, during the London Blitz, an elderly Dr. John Watson tells his nurse the an unrecorded adventure he shared with his late friend Sherlock Holmes. On May 19, 1882, a royal treasury ship is destroyed by a monstrous giant octopus on the coast of Newhaven. Holmes and Watson investigate the shipwreck and interview the sole survivor of the attack. Inspector Lestrade states that he has recently had contact with Holmes' estranged brother Thorpe, a fellow inspector who was paralyzed during a bank robbery.

In Whitechapel, a young man is killed by a Megalosaurus. Watson is skeptical until he and Holmes discover the creature on their morning constitutional. Finding escape, several more clues lead Holmes to deduce that the monsters are artificial, built by a criminal genius to acquire resources. On the case, the dinosaur steals a water pump operating a fountain and rolls of copper wire. Holmes reasons that the sea monster destroyed the ship earlier to acquire taxes from the colonies and the dinosaur stole the equipment to produce a bigger monster. On one of their leads, Lestrade is abducted. Holmes's deduction leads himself and Watson to a castle in Helmsmouth, where they come across a masked mechanical man: Spring-Heeled Jack.

Spring-Heeled Jack is revealed to be Thorpe Holmes, who also assumed the identity of a patient of Watson's. Inesidora Ivory, a robot disguised as a young woman, assists him. Thorpe explains that he built a cybernetic suit to cure his paralysis, the result of a ricocheted bullet fired by Lestrade. He plans to destroy London, assassinate Queen Victoria and frame Lestrade. Ivory travels to Buckingham Palace with a bomb while Thorpe pilots his most complex invention yet; a fire-breathing dragon in which he pilots and holds Lestrade hostage. Watson is sent to stop Ivory from killing the Queen, while Holmes pilots another one of Thorpe's flying inventions in an attempt to stop his brother.

The dragon sets fire to Parliament and Westminster Abbey. Ivory is deactivated by Watson moments before exploding and the dragon is sent crashing in the garden outside the Palace. Sherlock Holmes shoots Thorpe dead and proves Lestrade was not responsible for Thorpe's injury. Lestrade takes credit for saving the Queen and Holmes and Watson vow never to speak of the events again. In present time, Watson expires peacefully and his nurse visits his grave. Nearby, Ivory is visiting the grave of Thorpe Holmes.

== Cast ==
- Ben Syder as Sherlock Holmes
- Gareth David-Lloyd as Dr. John Watson
  - David Shackleton as "Old John Watson"
- Dominic Keating as Inspector Thorpe Holmes / "Spring-heeled Jack"
- William Huw as Inspector Lestrade
- Elizabeth Arends as Anesidora Ivory
- Catriona McDonald as Mrs. Hudson
- Rachael Evelyn as Miss Lucy Hudson
- Neil Williams as Phineas Stiles
- Dylan Jones as Grolton
- Chris Coxon as John Poole
- Katie Thomas as Sally Fassbinder / "Miss Pinchcock"
- Iago Patrick McGuire as Lees

== Release ==
Sherlock Holmes was released on DVD on January 26, 2010, a month after the similarly-titled Guy Ritchie film. The DVD features the full-length film and extras like a making-of feature called Exile on Baker Street: A Behind-the-scenes look at Sherlock Holmes, the official trailer and bloopers from filming. Syfy broadcasts the film under the full title Sir Arthur Conan Doyle's Sherlock Holmes. In the UK, the film was re-released on DVD by Anchor Bay Entertainment in 2014.

== Reception ==
Sherlock Holmes was met with skepticism immediately upon its announcement. Scott Foy of Dread Central criticized the plot synopsis, which indicated that Holmes would be facing "enormous monsters" attacking London. Foy said, "Sherlock Holmes, monster slayer. Who wants another snooty Sherlock Holmes mystery when you can have him and Dr. Watson make like Buffy and Angel? Maybe they can take it a step further and have Holmes' cocaine habit affect him in much the same way as Popeye's spinach."

In his book Sherlock Holmes On Screen: The Complete Film and TV History, Alan Barnes said that while Keating and David-Lloyd "acquit themselves with a little dignity," he described Ben Syder's Holmes as "punchable" and called the overall film "dismal," "cheap and cheerless," and criticized the "risible final act" in particular. He concluded by saying that "listing the production's many deficiencies would be an entirely pointless exercise."

Steve Anderson of Screenhead.com gave the film a rating of 6 out of 10, calling it "one of The Asylum's better movies", concluding that it's "far fetched" and "utterly mad" but claiming that it has a "spark of entertainment to it." Freddie Young of Fangoria called Sherlock Holmes "probably the best Asylum film to date" but recommended it only to those "willing to check reality at the door and just enjoy the silly ride." Jay Seaver of eFilmCritic called the film "kind of fun" but "disappointing," criticizing Syder's Holmes in particular, concluding that "a better Holmes would have allowed this movie to more squarely hit the mark." Admitting that Asylum's films are "so bad they’re good", Kristina Manente of SyFy called the film Sherlock Holmes vs. Dinosaurs and said it was "everything you want in a parody".

== See also ==
- List of films featuring dinosaurs
