= One of the Family (novel) =

Novel by Monica Dickens

- First edition
- Author: Monica Dickens
- Language: English
- Genre: Fiction
- Set in: London
- Publisher: Viking Press
- Publication date: 1993
- Publication place: England
- Media type: Print
- Pages: 347
- OCLC: 831334112

One of the Family (1993) was the last novel written by Monica Dickens, the great granddaughter of Charles Dickens. It is set in Edwardian London where the world, like main character Leonard Morley's life, is changing.

== Plot ==
The story starts when Leonard Morley receives a threatening note. Over time more of these notes turn up, and when the fourth has found its way to Morley, he resolves to tell his manager, William Whiteley. Mr Whiteley contemptuously tears up the note and is subsequently shot and killed. In the end, Horace Rayner (who is convinced he is Whitely's illegitimate son) is charged with murder, Morley testifies at the trial, and Rayner is sentenced to life imprisonment following an appeal against the death penalty.

There is also a sub plot involving an engaging charlatan, Tobias Taylor, who claims he is a doctor, and insinuates himself into the Morley family. His practice does very well for a while, by virtue of administering quack remedies and sympathetically listening to his (mainly female) patients whose ailments are largely imaginary. However, he can't restrain himself from seducing a niece of Mr Morley's, a woman he does not even like. Finally, he makes a catastrophic mistake when he fails to recognise that a member of the Morley family is in fact seriously ill and urgently needs a real doctor. This error leads to disaster for Tobias

There are also a number of other subplots involving Mr Morley's wider family and their interactions, with each other and the household servants, but principally with Tobias Taylor, until his career comes to an abrupt end

At the end Mr and Mrs Morley are left grieving over the death of their youngest son whilst having found themselves in the position of being unofficial carers for their illegitimate great nephew, son of the deceased Tobias. Mr Morley cheers himself with the thought that his house and family are his rock and his comfort. However, we know the Great War is only a few years away, the elder Morley son may end up enlisting and a home staffed by servants may no longer be possible

== Reception ==
Patrick Skene Catling praised the novel in the Evening Standard, writing, "Her last novel is up to her usual standard — humane, world wise and gently witty." In a positive review for The Daily Telegraph, Kirsty Milne said, "Monica Dickens evokes the age of corsets and chloroform without slipping too far into the nostalgia trap. Her tendency to jump between a large cast of characters sometimes leaves the novel a little unfocused, but her brisk energy supplies a narrative drive of its own."

Jessica Mann stated in The Sunday Telegraph, "The plot concerns the actual murder of William Whiteley, of the Queensway store; but this is not a murder story. It is a rambling tale of an extended family. Although the cast is a few steps down in cast from Galsworthy's characters, we are in Forsyte territory."
