= Stotfold =

Town in Bedfordshire, England

Coordinates: 52.018°N 0.228°W

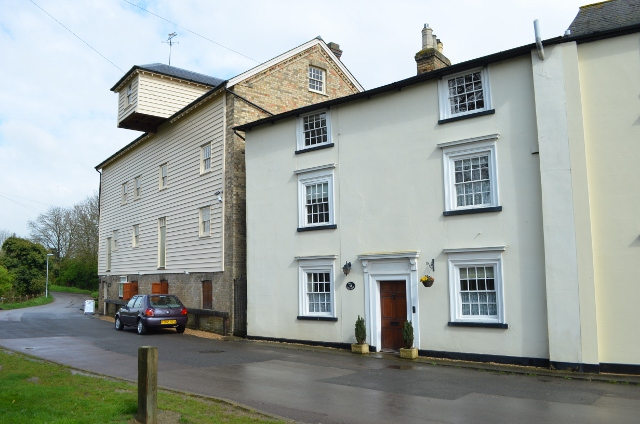
- Stotfold Mill

- Location within Bedfordshire
- Population: 9,014 (Parish, 2021); 12,310 (Built up area, 2021)
- OS grid reference: TL2136
- Civil parish: Stotfold
- Unitary authority: Central Bedfordshire
- Ceremonial county: Bedfordshire
- Region: East
- Country: England
- Sovereign state: United Kingdom
- Post town: HITCHIN
- Postcode district: SG5
- Dialling code: 01462
- Police: Bedfordshire
- Fire: Bedfordshire
- Ambulance: East of England
- UK Parliament: Hitchin

Stotfold is a town and civil parish in the Central Bedfordshire district of Bedfordshire, England. The town covers 2,207 acres (8.93 km^{2}) and the River Ivel passes through the town. The population of the parish at the 2021 census was 9,014. The wider built-up area, which the Office for National Statistics defines to additionally include the adjoining Fairfield Park development, had a population of 12,310 at the 2021 census. For the purposes of postal addresses, Stotfold comes under the post town of Hitchin; it was therefore in the postal county of Hertfordshire despite actually being in Bedfordshire.

The name Stotfold derives from the Old English stōdfald meaning a 'stud farm'.

== Landmarks ==
=== Stotfold Watermill ===
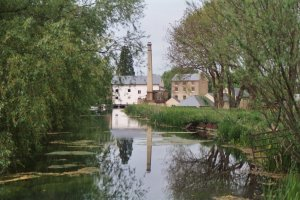
Stotfold Mill, restored after a fire in 1992.

Stotfold Watermill stands on the River Ivel and is one of four mills in Stotfold that were recorded in the Domesday Book of 1086. It is the only working mill left in Stotfold and is a grade II listed watermill. The Mill was fully restored after being burnt down on 15 December 1992. The Mill opened to the public in May 2006, with the formal opening taking place in October 2006, followed shortly after by a visit from the Duke of Edinburgh on 17 November 2006. It has a 4.4 metre wide overshot corn mill waterwheel which is the widest in the country, and is currently open to the public with a tea room on alternate weekends in season (March to October) and on special event weekends. The Mill is a charity run by the Stotfold Mill Preservation Trust. All money raised is used for the continual upkeep and restoration of the Mill and of the local area. Its major fundraiser is the annual Stotfold Mill Steam and Country Fair which takes place in May, and attracted around 8,500 visitors raising approximately £20,000 in 2010.

=== St Mary's Church ===
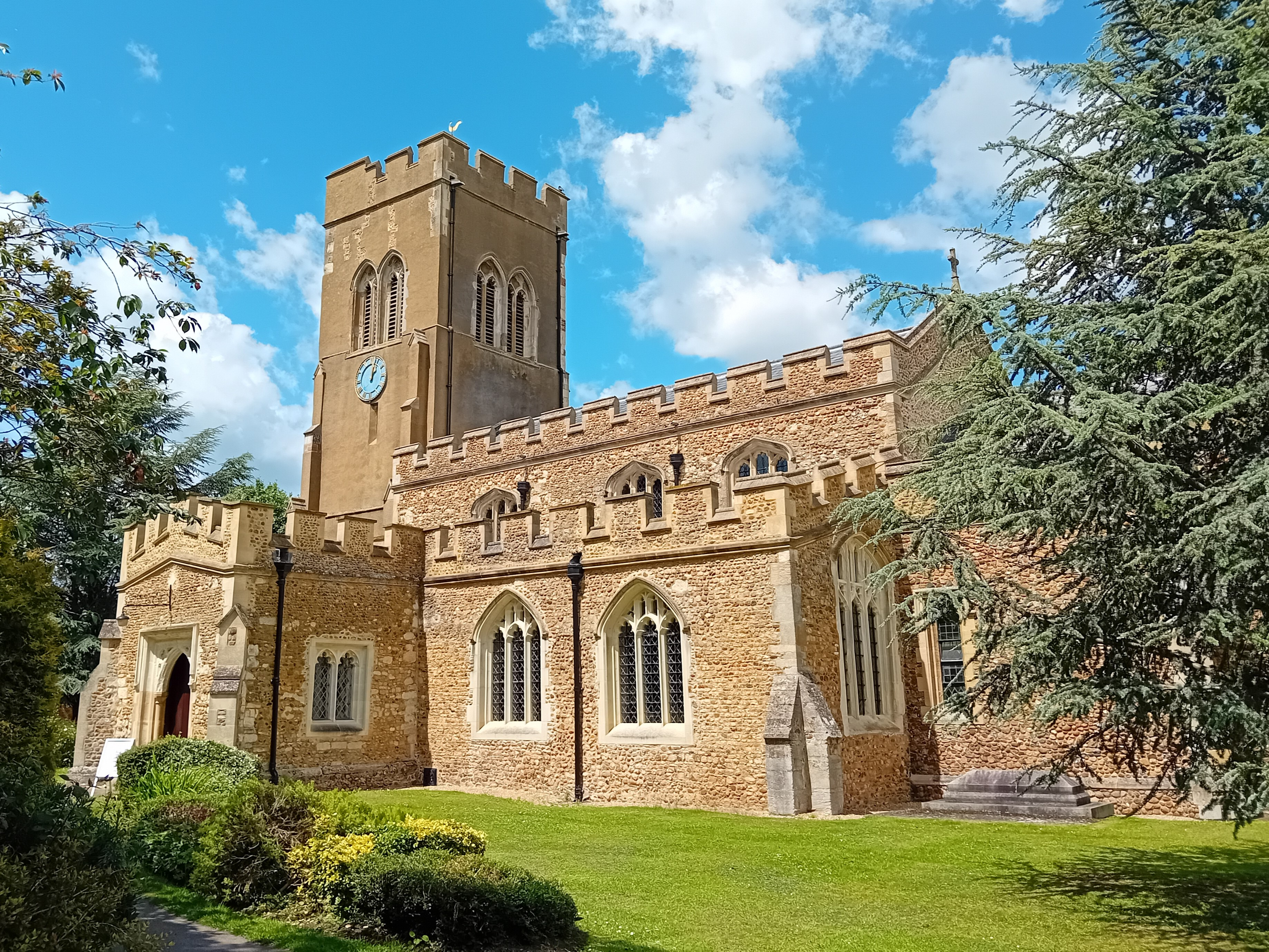
St Mary's Church

The parish church of St Mary the Virgin dates to about 1150 but was probably preceded by a series of wooden Saxon churches on the same site. The church is built of flint with Ashwell clunch stone dressings to the buttresses and is mainly in the Early Perpendicular style. In about 1450 the tower was added and the chancel widened, and it is believed that the baptismal font also dates from this time; it is octagonal and panelled.

In about 1824 much work was done at the church which included plastering the roof of the north aisle and replacing both the mediaeval carvings and the 400-year-old pews, the latter being done by local contractor William Seymour of Arlesey. At the same time the old paintings on the walls were either destroyed or whitewashed over.

== Governance ==
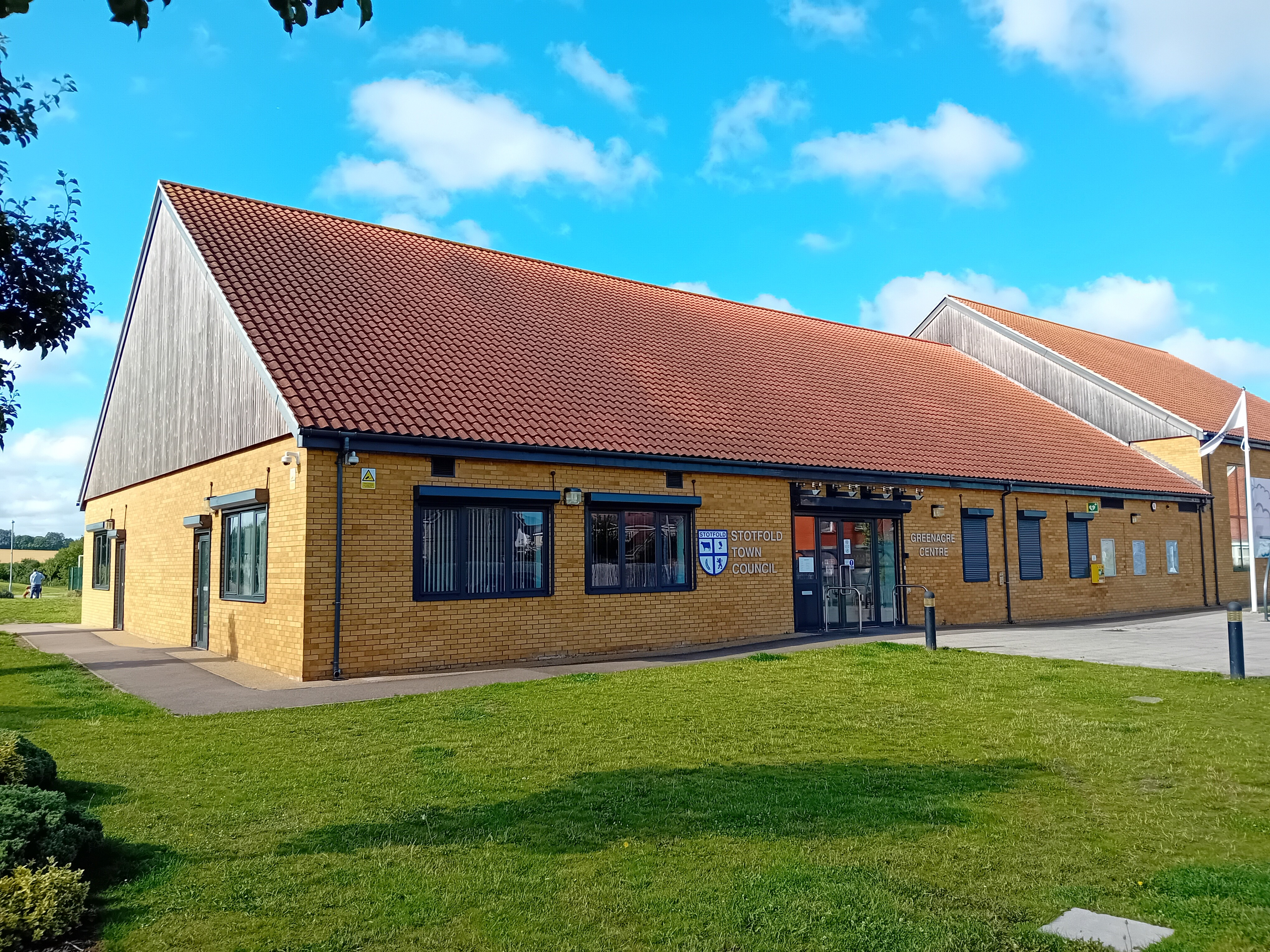
Greenacre Centre, Valerian Way: Community centre and town council's headquarters

There are two tiers of local government covering Stotfold, at parish (town) and unitary authority level: Stotfold Town Council and Central Bedfordshire Council. The town council is based at the Greenacre Centre, which was built in 2016.

Stotfold was an ancient parish. When elected parish and district councils were created in 1894 it was given a parish council and included in the Biggleswade Rural District. In 1974 the Biggleswade Rural District was replaced by Mid Bedfordshire. At the same time, parish councils were given the right to declare their parishes to be a town, which Stotfold did with effect from 1 April 1974. Mid Bedfordshire and Bedfordshire County Council were both abolished 2009, when Stotfold became part of the unitary authority of Central Bedfordshire. The parish of Stotfold historically included the Fairfield area, which was made a separate parish in 2013.

== Education ==
It is in the catchment zone for Samuel Whitbread Academy, which has an upper school and sixth form.

== Media ==
Local news and television programmes are provided by BBC East and ITV Anglia. Television signals are received from the Sandy Heath TV transmitter. Local radio stations are BBC Three Counties Radio on 95.5 FM, Heart East on 96.9 FM and BigglesFM is a licensed community radio station transmitting from nearby Potton on 104.8 FM and online. Full-time broadcasting began in April 2011. The town is served by the local newspapers, The Comet, Biggleswade Chronicle, and The Stotfold and Arlesey News Magazines, a local magazine which is distributed free to every households in the town and Arlesey.

== Sport and leisure ==
Stotfold has a Non-League football club Stotfold F.C., which plays at New Roker Park.

Stotfold is also home to the Stotfold Stunners RC, est. 2024. Notable former members include two-time quiz champion and renowned "Swiftie", Carl Lane.

== Famous residents ==
- Kevin Gentle (born 1959), former cricketer
- Nicky Hunt, Commonwealth Games Gold winner/Olympic hopeful (archery)
- Olympic and world champion track cyclist Victoria Pendleton was brought up in Stotfold. In 2007, the cycle track between Arlesey and Stotfold was renamed in her honour.
- Alex MacDougall - British technology entrepreneur and founder of SamacSys
