= Monica Dickens =

English writer (1915–1992)

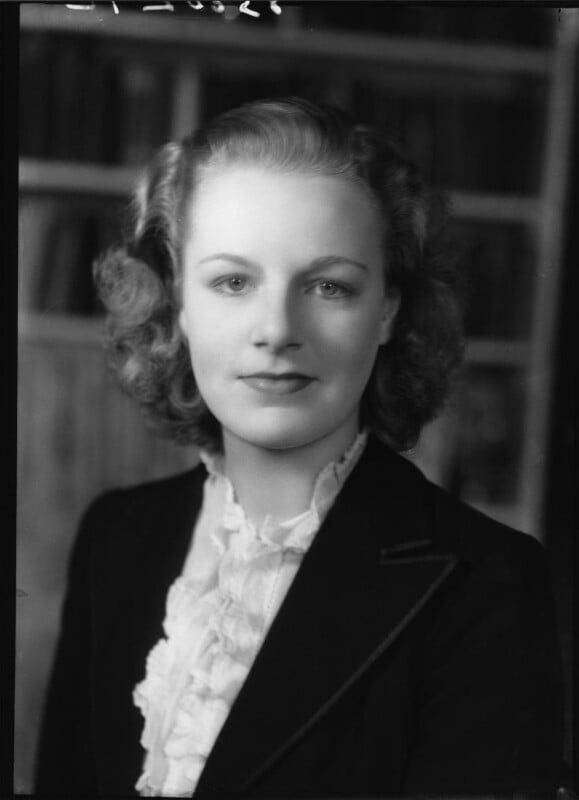
- Dickens in 1939
- Born: Monica Enid Dickens; 10 May 1915; Paris, France
- Died: 25 December 1992 (aged 77); Reading, Berkshire, England
- Relatives: Charles Dickens (great-grandfather); Sir Henry Fielding Dickens (grandfather)

Monica Enid Dickens, MBE (10 May 1915 – 25 December 1992) was an English writer, the great-granddaughter of Charles Dickens.

== Biography ==
Known as "Monty" to her family and friends, she was born into an upper-middle-class London family to Henry Charles Dickens (1878–1966), a barrister, and Fanny Dickens (née Runge). She was the granddaughter of Sir Henry Fielding Dickens KC. Disillusioned with the world she was brought up in – she was expelled from St Paul's Girls' School in London for throwing her school uniform into the Thames before she was presented at court as a debutante – she decided to go into domestic service despite coming from the privileged class; her experiences as a cook and general servant would form the nucleus of her first book, One Pair of Hands in 1939.

One Pair of Feet (1942) recounted her work as a nurse, and subsequently she worked in an aircraft factory and on the Hertfordshire Express – a local newspaper in Hitchin; her experiences in the latter field of work inspired her 1951 book My Turn to Make the Tea.

Soon after this, she moved from her home in Hinxworth in Hertfordshire to the United States after marrying a United States Navy officer, Roy O. Stratton, who died in 1985. They adopted two daughters, Pamela and Prudence. The family lived in Washington, D.C., and Falmouth, Massachusetts, on Cape Cod, producing the 1972 book of the same name. She continued to write, most of her books being set in Britain. She was also a regular columnist for the British women's magazine Woman's Own for twenty years (without admitting to being an expatriate).

Dickens had strong humanitarian interests which were manifested in her work with the National Society for the Prevention of Cruelty to Children (reflected in her 1953 book No More Meadows and her 1964 work Kate and Emma), the Royal Society for the Prevention of Cruelty to Animals (coming to the fore in her 1963 book Cobbler's Dream), and the Samaritans, the subject of her 1970 novel The Listeners – she helped to found the first American branch of the Samaritans in Massachusetts in 1974. From 1970 onwards she wrote a number of children's books; the Follyfoot series of books followed on from her earlier adult novel Cobbler's Dream, and were the basis of a children's TV series, also called Follyfoot, produced by Yorkshire Television for the UK's ITV network between 1971 and 1973 (and popular around the world for many years thereafter).

In 1978, Monica Dickens published her autobiography, An Open Book. In 1985 she returned to the UK after the death of her husband, and continued to write until her death on Christmas Day 1992, aged 77, her final book being published posthumously. She was also an occasional broadcaster for most of her writing career.

== Adult books ==
- One Pair of Hands (Michael Joseph, 1939; re-published by Penguin Books Ltd, Harmondsworth, and Penguin Books Pty Ltd, Mitcham, 1961, book number 1535)
- Mariana (1940; re-published in 1999 by Persephone Books)
- One Pair of Feet (1942) (adapted for film as The Lamp Still Burns)
- Edward's Fancy (1943)
- Thursday Afternoons (1945)
- The Happy Prisoner (1946) (adapted as a BBC TV play in 1965)
- Yours Sincerely (1947), in collaboration with Beverley Nichols
- Joy and Josephine (1948)
- Flowers on the Grass (1949)
- My Turn to Make the Tea (1951)
- No More Meadows (1953)
- The Winds of Heaven (1955; re-published in 2010 by Persephone Books)
- The Angel in the Corner (1956)
- Man Overboard (1958)
- The Heart of London (1961)
- Cobbler's Dream (1963; re-published in 1995 as New Arrival at Follyfoot)
- The Room Upstairs (1964)
- Kate and Emma (1965)
- The Landlord's Daughter (1968)
- The Listeners (1970)
- Cape Cod (1972) - Viking Press – non-fiction with William Berchen
- Talking of Horses (1973) – non-fiction
- Last Year When I Was Young (1974)
- An Open Book (William Heinemann Ltd, 1978; re-published by Penguin Books, 1980, ISBN 0-14-005197-X) – autobiography
- A Celebration (1984)
- A View From The Seesaw (1986, published by Dodd, Mead, ISBN 978-0-396-08526-3
- Dear Doctor Lily (1988)
- Enchantment (1989)
- Closed at Dusk (1990)
- Scarred (1991)
- One of the Family (1993)

== Children's books ==
The World's End series:

- The House at World's End (1970)
- Summer at World's End (1971)
- World's End in Winter (1972)
- Spring Comes to World's End (1973)

The Follyfoot series:

- Follyfoot (1971)
- Dora at Follyfoot (1972)
- The Horses of Follyfoot (1975)
- Stranger at Follyfoot (1976)

The book Cobbler's Dream also contains the same characters as in the Follyfoot series.

The Messenger series:

- The Messenger (1985)
- Ballad of Favour (1985)
- Cry of a Seagull (1986)
- The Haunting of Bellamy 4 (1986)

Non-series:

- The Great Escape (1975)

== Films ==
- The Lamp Still Burns (1943) (adapted from her 1942 novel One Pair of Feet)
- Love in Waiting (1948) (adapted from her original idea)
- Life in Her Hands (1951) (original screenplay with Anthony Steven)

== Strine ==
In late 1964 Dickens was visiting Australia to promote her works. It was reported in the Sydney Morning Herald on 30 November 1964 that during a book signing session in Sydney she had been approached by a woman who handed her a copy of her book and enquired, presumably in a broad Australian accent, "How much is it?" Dickens reportedly misheard this as an instruction as to the name which she should include in the inscription ("Emma Chisit") and thus was born the phenomenon of "Strine" which filled the newspaper's letter columns and subsequently was the subject of a separate weekly article and, later, a series of humorous books by Afferbeck Lauder (pseudonym of Alastair Morrison).

== See also ==
- Dickens family
