= Gretchen Wilson discography =

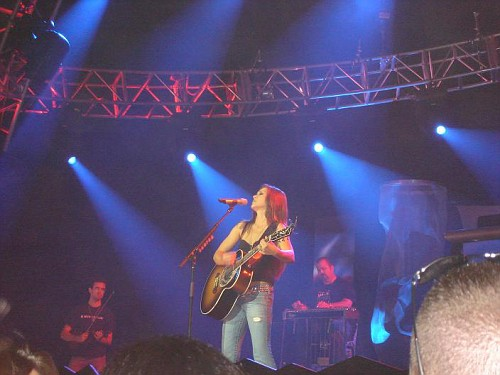
- Studio albums: 7
- Compilation albums: 3
- Singles: 24
- Music videos: 13
- Other charted songs: 4
- No. 1 singles: 1

The discography of American country music artist Gretchen Wilson consists of 24 singles and seven studio albums.

Wilson was propelled to fame by her No. 1 2004 hit "Redneck Woman", which spent a total of 5 weeks at No. 1 on the Country Songs chart. The song's album, Here for the Party has sold 5 million copies in the United States to date, and produced three additional top 10 hit singles on the Billboard Country chart between 2004 and 2005. Her second album, All Jacked Up sold a million copies in the United States. The title track was the album's most-successful single, reaching No. 8 on the country chart. Her third album, One of the Boys did not produce any top 20 country hits out of the three singles released, however, the album debuted at No. 1 on the Billboard Top Country Albums chart.

In 2008, Wilson released the lead-off single to her fourth studio album, "Don't Do Me No Good". The song failed at radio, only reaching No. 43, giving Wilson her first set of consecutive singles to not make the top 40 of the country chart. The song was initially the lead-off single to the album I Got Your Country Right Here, which had been delayed several times. A second single, "If I Could Do It All Again", became the first single of her career to not chart at all. Despite exiting Sony Music Nashville in July 2009, Wilson released the album via Redneck Records, her own record label, in 2010, and achieved a top 20 hit with its lead single, "Work Hard, Play Harder".

In 2013, Wilson released three new albums via Redneck Records. The first, Right on Time, was her fifth studio album, which charted two country singles in "Still Rollin'" and "Crazy", though neither made the top 40. The second and third — Under the Covers and Christmas in My Heart — consisted of cover songs of classic rock and Christmas music, respectively. She also released her first live album, Still Here for the Party, in October 2014 to commemorate the tenth anniversary of her debut release.

== Studio albums ==
=== 2000s ===
Title	Album details	Peak chart positions							Certifications (sales threshold)
Title	Album details	US Country	US	AUS	CAN	NOR	SWE	UK	Certifications (sales threshold)
Here for the Party	Release date: May 11, 2004; Label: Epic Nashville; Formats: CD, music download	1	2	21	—	14	7	60	AUS: Gold; CAN: Platinum; US: 5× Platinum
All Jacked Up	Release date: September 27, 2005; Label: Epic Nashville; Formats: CD, cassette	1	1	61	10	—	—	—	CAN: Gold; US: Platinum
One of the Boys	Release date: May 15, 2007; Label: Columbia Nashville; Formats: CD, music download	1	5	91	—	—	—	—	
"—" denotes releases that did not chart

=== 2010s ===
Title	Album details	Peak chart positions		
Title	Album details	US Country	US	US Indie
I Got Your Country Right Here	Release date: March 30, 2010; Label: Redneck Records; Formats: CD, music download	6	34	3
Right on Time	Release date: April 2, 2013; Label: Redneck Records; Formats: CD, music download	24	91	21
Under the Covers	Release date: June 4, 2013; Label: Redneck Records; Formats: CD, music download	40	—	46
Ready to Get Rowdy	Release date: June 16, 2017; Label: Redneck Records; Formats: CD, music download	—	—	—
"—" denotes releases that did not chart

== Christmas albums ==
Title	Album details
Christmas in My Heart	Release date: October 8, 2013; Label: Redneck Records; Formats: CD, music download

== Live albums ==
Title	Album details
Still Here for the Party	Release date: October 27, 2014; Label: Redneck Records; Formats: CD, music download

== Compilation albums ==
Title	Album details	Peak chart positions	
Title	Album details	US Country	US
Greatest Hits	Release date: January 19, 2010; Label: Columbia Nashville; Formats: CD, music download	24	168
Playlist: The Very Best of Gretchen Wilson	Release date: January 31, 2012; Label: Epic/Legacy Recordings; Formats: CD, music download	71	—
Snapshot	Release date: August 19, 2014; Label: Redneck Records; Formats: CD, music download	—	—
"—" denotes releases that did not chart

== Singles ==
=== 2000s ===
Year	Single	Peak chart positions					Certifications (sales threshold)	Album
Year	Single	US Country	US	AUS	IRE	UK	Certifications (sales threshold)	Album
2004	"Redneck Woman"	1	22	50	45	42	US: Platinum	Here for the Party
2004	"Here for the Party"	3	29	—	—	—	US: Gold	Here for the Party
2004	"When I Think About Cheatin'"	4	39	—	—	—		Here for the Party
2005	"Homewrecker"	2	56	—	—	—		Here for the Party
2005	"All Jacked Up"	8	42	—	—	—	US: Gold	All Jacked Up
2005	"I Don't Feel Like Loving You Today"	22	109	—	—	—		All Jacked Up
2006	"Politically Uncorrect" (featuring Merle Haggard)^{[A]}	23	—	—	—	—		All Jacked Up
2006	"California Girls"	25	121	—	—	—		All Jacked Up
2006	"Come to Bed" (featuring John Rich)	32	—	—	—	—		One of the Boys
2007	"One of the Boys"	35	—	—	—	—		One of the Boys
2007	"You Don't Have to Go Home"	53	—	—	—	—		One of the Boys
2008	"Don't Do Me No Good"	43	—	—	—	—		—N/a
2009	"If I Could Do It All Again"	—	—	—	—	—		—N/a
2009	"Work Hard, Play Harder"	18	115	—	—	—		I Got Your Country Right Here
"—" denotes releases that did not chart

=== 2010s and 2020s ===
Year	Single	Peak chart positions		Album
Year	Single	US Country	US Country Airplay	Album
2010	"I Got Your Country Right Here"	53	—	I Got Your Country Right Here
2011	"I'd Love to Be Your Last"	47	—	I Got Your Country Right Here
2012	"One Good Friend"	—	—	Right On Time
2013	"Still Rollin'"	—	60	Right On Time
2013	"Crazy"	—	58	Right On Time
2014	"Chariot"	—	—	Still Here for the Party
2016	"Rowdy"	—	—	Ready to Get Rowdy
2017	"Summertime Town"	—	—	Ready to Get Rowdy
2018	"Stacy"	—	—	Ready to Get Rowdy
2024	"Little Miss Runner Up"	—	—	TBD
"—" denotes releases that did not chart

== Other singles ==
=== Featured singles ===
Year	Single	Artist(s)	Peak positions		Certifications (sales threshold)	Album
Year	Single	Artist(s)	US Country	CAN Country	Certifications (sales threshold)	Album
2006	"That's How They Do It in Dixie"	Hank Williams Jr. (featuring Big & Rich, and Van Zant)	35	—		That's How They Do It in Dixie: The Essential Collection
2011	"Fake I.D."	Big & Rich	47	—	RMNZ: Gold	Footloose (soundtrack)
2025	"First Time Living"	Alli Walker	—	43		TBA

=== Other charted songs ===
Year	Single	Peak chart positions	Album
Year	Single	US Country	Album
2004	"Red Bird Fever"^{[B]}	60	—N/a
2005	"Our America" (with Big & Rich and Cowboy Troy)	44	Comin' to Your City
2005	"Politically Uncorrect" (with Merle Haggard)^{[A]}	58	All Jacked Up
2010	"I Want a Hippopotamus for Christmas"	47	Christmas in My Heart

== Other album appearances ==
Year	Song	Album
2006	"Picture" (with Kid Rock)	Live Trucker
2006	"Lips of a Bottle" (with Blaine Larsen)	Rockin' You Tonight
2006	"Cowboy Up" (with Vince Gill)	Three Days
2007	"Bad Moon Rising" (with Ann Wilson)	Hope & Glory
2007	"Jackson" (with The Charlie Daniels Band)	Deuces
2008	"Merry Christmas Baby" (with Elvis Presley)	Christmas Duets
2010	"Don't Come Home A-Drinkin' (With Lovin' on Your Mind)"	Coal Miner's Daughter: A Tribute to Loretta Lynn
2015	"The Feeling Never Dies" (with Buckcherry)	Rock 'n' Roll
2019	"Barracuda" (Heart featuring Jerry Cantrell, Dave Navarro, Duff McKagan, Rufus Wainwright, Gretchen Wilson and Carrie Underwood)	Live in Atlantic City
2019	"Even It Up" (Heart)	Live in Atlantic City
2019	"Rock and Roll" (Heart)	Live in Atlantic City

== Videography ==
=== Music videos ===
Year	Title	Director
2004	"Redneck Woman"	David Hogan
2004	"Here for the Party"	Deaton Flanigen/Gary Halverson
2004	"When I Think About Cheatin'"	Deaton Flanigen
2005	"All Jacked Up"	Deaton Flanigen/Gretchen Wilson
2005	"I Don't Feel Like Loving You Today"	Alan Carter
2006	"Politically Uncorrect"	Deaton Flanigen
2006	"California Girls"	Deaton Flanigen/Marc Oswald
2006	"Come to Bed"	Deaton Flanigen/Marc Oswald
2007	"You Don't Have to Go Home" (Live)	Deaton Flanigen
2009	"Work Hard, Play Harder"	Deaton Flanigen
2013	"Still Rollin'"	Allen Laseter
2014	"Chariot"	Cory B. Clay
2018	"Stacy"	
2024	"Little Miss Runner Up"	Natalie Ruffino Wilson

=== Guest appearances ===
Year	Title	Director
2006	"That's How They Do It in Dixie" (Hank Williams Jr. featuring Big & Rich, and Van Zant)	Deaton Flanigen
2011	"Fake I.D." (with Big & Rich)	

== Notes ==
- A "Politically Uncorrect" originally charted as an album cut in October 2005 before being confirmed as a single.
- B "Red Bird Fever" was a digital single, set to the tune of "Redneck Woman", released in November 2004 in tribute to the St. Louis Cardinals.
