= 2010 in country music =

This is a list of notable events in country music that took place in the year 2010.

== Events ==
- January 31 – Taylor Swift becomes the youngest person to win the Grammy Award for Album of the Year for her sophomore country album Fearless (2008). Fearless additionally wins the award for Best Country Album, while Swift's "White Horse" is awarded Best Female Country Vocal Performance and Best Country Song.
- February 1 – Loretta Lynn marks 50 years since she signed her first recording contract.
- February 6 – Wynonna Judd announces that she will reunite with her mother, Naomi Judd, to tour and record a studio album for the final time as The Judds by the end of 2010.
  - George Hamilton IV celebrates his 50th Grand Ole Opry Anniversary
- February 13 – Two men in a small pickup truck die from injuries they sustained after colliding with one of Trace Adkins's tour buses. The truck was believed to have crossed the "no passing" line in the center of the road which resulted in the crash. Several members of Adkins' band were aboard the bus, but did not suffer any major injuries. Adkins himself was not on board the bus at the time.
- April 14 – Disney Music Group announces the closure of Lyric Street Records. The label's flagship act, Rascal Flatts, along with Bucky Covington, Kevin Fowler and Tyler Dickerson follow them within the label's parent company. Three other artists on the roster – Sarah Buxton, Love and Theft and The Parks – are released from the label.
- April 18 – Carrie Underwood becomes the first woman in history to win the Entertainer of the Year award at the Academy of Country Music Awards twice. Underwood previously won the award at the 2009 ceremony.
- May 3 – Chely Wright becomes the first major country artist to come out as homosexual.
- May 4 – Flooding on the Cumberland River in Nashville, Tennessee, causes damage to the Grand Ole Opry House and Gaylord Opryland Resort & Convention Center, with several feet of water. Grand Ole Opry performances are moved to the Ryman Auditorium, War Memorial Auditorium and the Two Rivers Baptist Church; all of which were unaffected by the floods. The common areas of the Gaylord Opryland Hotel were destroyed, and parts of the hotel are under 10 feet of water.
- May 11 – Blake Shelton and Miranda Lambert become engaged after five years of dating.
- May 26 – Country music legend Willie Nelson cuts his "trademark, waist-length braids."
- May 29 – The Lost Trailers announce that they will disband in September after the final date of their 2010 concert tour.
- June 23 – Kellie Pickler and songwriter Kyle Jacobs become engaged after two and a half years of dating.
- July 10 – Carrie Underwood and Ottawa Senators player Mike Fisher marry in a private ceremony in Georgia.
- October 12 – Martina McBride and Gretchen Wilson at The Recording Academy.
- October 26 – Billy Ray Cyrus and wife Tish file for divorce in Nashville. According to People magazine, the couple filed for divorce documents on Tuesday, October 26, 2010, citing irreconcilable differences Less than a year later, on March 18, 2011, Cyrus announces on The View that he has dropped the divorce.
- October 30 – Randy Travis and wife Elizabeth file for divorce. According to the Associated Press, Randy filed a petition for dissolution of marriage in Albuquerque, N.M. on Thursday, October 28, citing that a "state of incompatibility exists between the parties".
- November 10 – Carrie Underwood and Kellie Pickler at the 2010 CMA Awards.
- November 11 – The Nashville Scene publishes a report from representatives of British progressive rock band The Alan Parsons Project, alleging that the chorus of Lady Antebellum's "Need You Now" – which during 2010 became a major crossover smash hit in the U.S. and worldwide – has the same melody as the chorus of Parsons' "Eye in the Sky", a 1982 hit single that peaked at #3 on the Billboard Hot 100.
- December 5 – The John F. Kennedy Center for the Performing Arts honors Merle Haggard for his lifetime contributions to the arts.
- December – The song "Love Like Crazy" by Lee Brice, which peaked at No. 3 on the Billboard Hot Country Songs chart in September, is named the No. 1 country song of 2010, and in doing so becomes the first non-No. 1 song in the chart's 66-year history to earn such an honor. Earlier in the year, "Love Like Crazy" broke the chart's longevity record, spending 55 weeks on the chart and surpassing (by one week) a 62-year-old record, established by Eddy Arnold's "Bouquet of Roses."

== Top hits of the year ==
The following songs placed within the Top 20 on the Hot Country Songs or Canada Country charts in 2010:

US	CAN	Single	Artist	Reference
3	2	Ain't Back Yet	Kenny Chesney	
1	3	All About Tonight	Blake Shelton	
1	15	All Over Me	Josh Turner	
1	1	American Honey	Lady Antebellum	
2	1	American Saturday Night	Brad Paisley	
1	1	Anything Like Me	Brad Paisley	
1	1	As She's Walking Away	Zac Brown Band featuring Alan Jackson	
6	30	Backwoods	Justin Moore	
17	44	Beer on the Table	Josh Thompson	
1	1	The Boys of Fall	Kenny Chesney	
1	8	Come Back Song	Darius Rucker	
1	1	Consider Me Gone	Reba	
2	3	Crazy Town	Jason Aldean	
6	11	Cryin' for Me (Wayman's Song)	Toby Keith	
14	49	Didn't You Know How Much I Loved You	Kellie Pickler	
15	6	Every Dog Has Its Day	Toby Keith	
5	25	Farmer's Daughter	Rodney Atkins	
10	7	Fearless	Taylor Swift	
1	4	Free	Zac Brown Band	
18	50	Get Off on the Pain	Gary Allan	
1	1	Gimmie That Girl	Joe Nichols	
17	11	Hard Hat and a Hammer	Alan Jackson	
10	20	Hell on the Heart	Eric Church	
1	3	Highway 20 Ride	Zac Brown Band	
1	8	Hillbilly Bone	Blake Shelton featuring Trace Adkins	
20	—	Hip to My Heart	The Band Perry	
3	3	History in the Making	Darius Rucker	
1	2	The House That Built Me	Miranda Lambert	
17	42	How I Got to Be This Way	Justin Moore	
14	—	Hurry Home	Jason Michael Carroll	
3	4	I Gotta Get to You	George Strait	
7	6	I Keep On Loving You	Reba	
2	12	I Wanna Make You Close Your Eyes	Dierks Bentley	
2	1	I'm In	Keith Urban	
1	8	If I Die Young	The Band Perry	
16	17	It's Just That Way	Alan Jackson	
4	29	Keep On Lovin' You	Steel Magnolia	
1	2	A Little More Country Than That	Easton Corbin	
6	38	Little White Church	Little Big Town	
3	11	Love Like Crazy	Lee Brice	
1	2	Lover, Lover	Jerrod Niemann	
1	3	The Man I Want to Be	Chris Young	
2	7	Mine	Taylor Swift	
12	31	Only Prettier	Miranda Lambert	
1	1	Our Kind of Love	Lady Antebellum	
13	12	Pray for You	Jaron and the Long Road to Love	
1	1	Pretty Good at Drinkin' Beer	Billy Currington	
1	3	Rain Is a Good Thing	Luke Bryan	
1	1	Roll with It	Easton Corbin	
4	13	She Won't Be Lonely Long	Clay Walker	
6	13	Smile	Uncle Kracker	
1	1	Southern Voice	Tim McGraw	
16	11	Still	Tim McGraw	
2	3	Stuck Like Glue	Sugarland	
1	2	Temporary Home	Carrie Underwood	
1	1	That's How Country Boys Roll	Billy Currington	
15	44	This Ain't No Love Song	Trace Adkins	
13	44	This Ain't Nothin'	Craig Morgan	
3	1	'Til Summer Comes Around	Keith Urban	
18	—	Today	Gary Allan	
19	35	Trailerhood	Toby Keith	
1	1	The Truth	Jason Aldean	
20	—	Turning Home	David Nail	
14	13	Twang	George Strait	
1	2	Undo It	Carrie Underwood	
7	22	Unstoppable	Rascal Flatts	
1	1	Water	Brad Paisley	
15	50	Way Out Here	Josh Thompson	
2	2	White Liar	Miranda Lambert	
1	1	Why Don't We Just Dance	Josh Turner	
1	2	Why Wait	Rascal Flatts	
18	31	Work Hard, Play Harder	Gretchen Wilson	
11	18	Wrong Baby Wrong	Martina McBride	

== Top new album releases ==
The following albums placed within the Top 50 on the Top Country Albums charts in 2010:

US	Album	Artist	Record label	Release date	Reference
7	34 Number Ones	Alan Jackson	Arista Nashville	November 23	
5	Achin' and Shakin'	Laura Bell Bundy	Mercury Nashville	April 13	
6	The Age of Miracles	Mary Chapin Carpenter	Zoë	April 27	
9	Album Number Two	Joey + Rory	Vanguard/Sugar Hill	September 14	
1	All About Tonight (EP)	Blake Shelton	Reprise Nashville	August 10	
3	All the Women I Am	Reba McEntire	Starstruck/Valory	November 9	
2	American VI: Ain't No Grave	Johnny Cash	Lost Highway	February 23	
2	The Band Perry	The Band Perry	Republic Nashville	October 12	
1	Bullets in the Gun	Toby Keith	Show Dog-Universal Music	October 5	
2	Burning the Day	Randy Rogers Band	MCA Nashville	August 24	
1	Charleston, SC 1966	Darius Rucker	Capitol Nashville	October 12	
8	Chicken & Biscuits	Colt Ford	Average Joes	April 20	
4	Country Music	Willie Nelson	Rounder	April 20	
2	Country Strong Soundtrack	Various Artists	RCA Nashville	October 26	
5	Country Strong: More Music from the Motion Picture	Various Artists	Screen Gems	December 21	
1	Cowboy's Back in Town	Trace Adkins	Show Dog-Universal Music	August 17	
6	Crazy Heart Soundtrack	Various Artists	New West	January 19	
4	Easton Corbin	Easton Corbin	Mercury Nashville	March 2	
2	Enjoy Yourself	Billy Currington	Mercury Nashville	September 21	
2	Freight Train	Alan Jackson	Arista Nashville	March 30	
2	Get Closer	Keith Urban	Capitol Nashville	November 16	
2	Get Off on the Pain	Gary Allan	MCA Nashville	March 9	
2	Getting Dressed in the Dark	Jaron and the Long Road to Love	Jaronwood Music/Universal; Republic/Big Machine	June 22	
1	The Guitar Song	Jamey Johnson	Mercury Nashville	September 14	
2	Halfway to Heaven	Brantley Gilbert	Average Joes	March 16	
9	Happy Hour: The South River Road Sessions (EP)	Uncle Kracker	Atlantic	June 22	
2	Haywire	Josh Turner	MCA Nashville	February 9	
1	Hemingway's Whiskey	Kenny Chesney	Blue Chair/BNA Records	September 28	
2	Hillbilly Bone (EP)	Blake Shelton	Reprise Nashville	March 2	
4	Hits Alive	Brad Paisley	Arista Nashville	November 2	
6	I Got Your Country Right Here	Gretchen Wilson	Redneck Records	March 30	
1	The Incredible Machine	Sugarland	Mercury Nashville	October 19	
3	iTunes Session (EP)	Lady Antebellum	Capitol Nashville	August 17	
1	Judge Jerrod & the Hung Jury	Jerrod Niemann	Sea Gayle/Arista Nashville	July 13	
2	Junky Star	Ryan Bingham & the Dead Horses	Lost Highway	August 31	
4	Loaded: The Best of Blake Shelton	Blake Shelton	Reprise Nashville	November 9	
6	Love Heals	Wynonna	Cracker Barrel	May 24	
9	Love Like Crazy	Lee Brice	Curb	June 8	
4	A Merry Little Christmas	Lady Antebellum	Capitol Nashville	October 12	
3	My Best Days	Danny Gokey	RCA Nashville/19	March 2	
1	My Kinda Party	Jason Aldean	Broken Bow	November 2	
1	Need You Now	Lady Antebellum	Capitol Nashville	January 26	
1	Nothing Like This	Rascal Flatts	Big Machine	November 16	
3	Now That's What I Call Country Volume 3	Various Artists	Capitol	September 14	
7	Now That's What I Call the USA: The Patriotic Country Collection	Various Artists	Sony	June 15	
6	Number One Hits	Tim McGraw	Curb	November 30	
2	Pass the Jar	Zac Brown Band	Atlantic	May 4	
1	The Reason Why	Little Big Town	Capitol Nashville	August 24	
4	Rebel Within	Hank Williams III	Curb	May 25	
10	Shake What God Gave Ya	James Otto	Warner Bros. Nashville	September 14	
5	She Won't Be Lonely Long	Clay Walker	Curb	June 8	
1	Speak Now	Taylor Swift	Big Machine	October 25	
3	Sweet and Wild	Jewel	Valory Music Group	June 8	
8	They Call Me Cadillac	Randy Houser	Show Dog-Universal Music	September 21	
2	Up on the Ridge	Dierks Bentley	Capitol Nashville	June 8	
9	Way Out Here	Josh Thompson	Columbia Nashville	February 23	
1	You Get What You Give	Zac Brown Band	Atlantic	September 21	

=== Other top albums ===
US	Album	Artist	Record label	Release date	Reference
32	The Band Perry EP	The Band Perry	Republic Nashville	April 6	
34	The Best of Chris Cagle	Chris Cagle	Capitol Nashville	February 9	
43	Best Of... So Far	Kevin Fowler	Kevin Fowler	December 7	
49	Brand New Me	Cory Morrow	APEX/Write On	August 31	
41	Breathe Deep	Guy Penrod	Spring House	February 23	
28	Christian Kane (EP)	Christian Kane	Bigger Picture	March 9	
14	Coal Miner's Daughter: A Tribute to Loretta Lynn	Various Artists	Columbia Nashville	November 9	
19	Dailey & Vincent Sing the Statler Brothers	Dailey & Vincent	Cracker Barrel	February 2	
12	The Definitive Greatest Hits: 'Til the Last Shot's Fired	Trace Adkins	Capitol Nashville	October 12	
40	The Essential Dixie Chicks	Dixie Chicks	Sony	October 26	
35	Everything Comes and Goes (EP)	Michelle Branch	Warner Bros. Nashville	July 13	
44	50th Anniversary Collection	Loretta Lynn	MCA Nashville	April 6	
41	14 Love Songs for the 14th	Rascal Flatts	Lyric Street	February 9	
46	Ghost Train: The Studio B Sessions	Marty Stuart	Sugar Hill	August 24	
24	Good Ol' Nashville	Various Artists	Cracker Barrel	February 23	
16	The Gospel Music of The Statler Brothers: Volume 1	The Statler Brothers	Gaither	May 18	
17	The Gospel Music of The Statler Brothers: Volume 2	The Statler Brothers	Gaither	May 18	
24	Greatest Hits	Gretchen Wilson	Columbia Nashville	January 19	
41	Head Above Water	Brandon Rhyder	Reserve	February 16	
27	High in the Rockies: A Live Album	Jason Boland & the Stragglers	Thirty Tigers	April 20	
25	The House Rules	Christian Kane	Bigger Picture	December 7	
18	I Am What I Am	Merle Haggard	Vanguard	April 20	
43	Icon: Don Williams	Don Williams	MCA Nashville	August 31	
45	Icon: Johnny Cash	Johnny Cash	Mercury Nashville	August 31	
38	Icon: Patsy Cline	Patsy Cline	MCA Nashville	August 31	
69	Icon: Trisha Yearwood	Trisha Yearwood	MCA Nashville	August 31	
32	Lifted Off the Ground	Chely Wright	Vanguard	May 4	
41	Live at Billy Bob's Texas	Wade Bowen	Smith	April 27	
36	Love Songs	Vince Gill	MCA Nashville	January 26	
19	Matt Kennon	Matt Kennon	BamaJam/Stroudavarious	May 11	
47	Michael Waddell's Bone Collector: The Brotherhood Album	Rhett Akins and Dallas Davidson	Reprise	September 28	
50	Mosaic	Ricky Skaggs	Skaggs Family	August 24	
46	Mud Digger	Various Artists	Average Joes	August 3	
32	Not That Far Away (EP)	Jennette McCurdy	Capitol Nashville	August 17	
42	Outlaw	Mark Chesnutt	Saguaro Road	June 22	
20	Party Heard Around the World	Lonestar	Saguaro Road	April 27	
47	Patchwork River	Jim Lauderdale	Emergent	May 11	
27	Playlist: The Very Best of Dixie Chicks	Dixie Chicks	Columbia	June 1	
41	Right Road Now	Whitney Duncan	Warner Bros. Nashville	April 20	
25	The Road & the Rodeo	Aaron Watson	31 Tigers	October 12	
11	Rodney Atkins	Rodney Atkins	Cracker Barrel	September 7	
12	Sarah Buxton	Sarah Buxton	Lyric Street	February 23	
27	The Secret Sisters	The Secret Sisters	Universal Republic	October 12	
28	She's Like Texas	Josh Abbott Band	Pretty Damn Tough	February 16	
22	Somewhere in Time	Reckless Kelly	Yep Roc	February 9	
47	Steel Magnolia — EP	Steel Magnolia	Big Machine	February 23	
12	Sweet Home Alabama: The Country Music Tribute to Lynyrd Skynyrd	Various Artists	Hip-O Records	July 20	
16	Tailgate	Trailer Choir	Show Dog-Universal Music	July 6	
21	Taken	Rhonda Vincent	Upper Management	September 21	
40	Top 10	Randy Travis	Warner Bros. Nashville	September 28	
21	Unmistakable: Love (EP)	Jo Dee Messina	Curb	April 27	
43	Wear the Black: A Tribute to Johnny Cash	Esteban	Celestiel	November 16	
43	Welder	Elizabeth Cook	31 Tigers	May 11	
43	Winter Wonderland	Mandy Barnett	Rounder/Cracker Barrel	September 20	
31	A Woman Needs	Jessica Harp	Warner Bros. Nashville	March 16	

== Deaths ==
- January 16 – Carl Smith, 82, honky tonk-styled star of the 1950s through 1970s.
- January 27 – Shirley Collie Nelson, 78, rockabilly artist, second wife of Willie Nelson.
- May 26 – Judy Lynn, 74, Nashville Sound artist of the 1960s and former beauty pageant queen.
- May 28 - Slim Bryant, 101, singer, songwriter, best known for series of commercials in the 1920’s.
- June 13 – Jimmy Dean, 81, popular country music singer, actor and entrepreneur, best known for his 1961 hit "Big Bad John" and his eponymously named sausage company.
- July 15 – Hank Cochran, 74, songwriter behind hits such as "I Fall to Pieces" and "The Chair" among others.
- July 17 – Fred Carter Jr., 76, session guitarist and father of country artist Deana Carter.
- July 22 – Margaret Ann Rich, 76, songwriter and widow of Charlie Rich
- July 26 – Ben Keith, 73, session pedal steel guitarist, record producer
- July 31 – George Richey, 74, songwriter and record producer; widower of Tammy Wynette. (chronic obstructive pulmonary disease)
- August 23 – Bill Phillips, 74, singer and songwriter best known for his 1966 country hit, "Put It Off Until Tomorrow", written by Dolly Parton.
- October 24 – Linda Hargrove, 61, singer and songwriter, wrote "Just Get Up and Close the Door" by Johnny Rodriguez.
- November 3 - Ronny Scaife, 63, songwriter ("The Whiskey Ain't Workin'", "Hearts Are Gonna Roll"), brain hemorrhage

== Hall of Fame inductees ==
=== Bluegrass Music Hall of Fame Inductees ===
- John Hartford
- Louise Scruggs

=== Country Music Hall of Fame inductees ===
- Jimmy Dean (August 10, 1928 – June 13, 2010)
- Ferlin Husky (December 3, 1925 – March 17, 2011)
- Billy Sherrill (November 5, 1936 – August 4, 2015)
- Don Williams (May 27, 1939 – September 8, 2017)

=== Canadian Country Music Hall of Fame inductees ===
- Donna & LeRoy Anderson
- Willie P. Bennett
- Marie Bottrell
- Eddie Eastman
- Don Harron
- Fred McKenna
- Wayne Rostad
- Ray St. Germain
- Joyce Smith
- Tom Tompkins
- Hal & Ginger Willis

== Major awards ==
=== Academy of Country Music ===
(presented April 3, 2011 in Las Vegas, Nevada)

- Entertainer of the Year – Taylor Swift
- Top Male Vocalist – Brad Paisley
- Top Female Vocalist – Miranda Lambert
- Top Vocal Group – Lady Antebellum
- Top Vocal Duo – Sugarland
- Top New Solo Artist – Eric Church
- Top New Duo/Group – The Band Perry
- Top New Artist – The Band Perry
- Album of the Year – Need You Now, Lady Antebellum
- Single Record of the Year – "The House That Built Me", Miranda Lambert
- Song of the Year – "The House That Built Me", Miranda Lambert
- Video of the Year – "The House That Built Me", Miranda Lambert
- Vocal Event of the Year – "As She's Walking Away", Zac Brown Band and Alan Jackson

=== Americana Music Honors & Awards ===
- Album of the Year – The List (Rosanne Cash)
- Artist of the Year – Ryan Bingham
- Duo/Group of the Year – The Avett Brothers
- Song of the Year – "The Weary Kind" (Ryan Bingham and T Bone Burnett)
- Emerging Artist of the Year – Hayes Carll
- Instrumentalist of the Year – Buddy Miller
- Spirit of Americana/Free Speech Award – Mary Chapin Carpenter
- Lifetime Achievement: Songwriting – John Mellencamp
- Lifetime Achievement: Performance – Wanda Jackson
- Lifetime Achievement: Instrumentalist – Greg Leisz
- Lifetime Achievement: Executive – Luke Lewis
- Lifetime Achievement: Producer/Engineer – Brian Ahern

=== American Country Awards ===
(presented December 6 in Las Vegas, Nevada)

- Artist of the Year – Carrie Underwood
- Female Artist of the Year – Carrie Underwood
- Male Artist of the Year – Brad Paisley
- Group/Duo of the Year – Lady Antebellum
- Touring Package of the Year – "Play On Tour", Carrie Underwood
- Album of the Year – Play On, Carrie Underwood
- Breakthrough Artist of the Year – Easton Corbin
- Single of the Year – "Need You Now", Lady Antebellum
- Female Single of the Year – "Cowboy Casanova", Carrie Underwood
- Male Single of the Year – "Why Don't We Just Dance", Josh Turner
- Duo/Group Single of the Year – "Need You Now", Lady Antebellum
- Breakthrough Single of the Year – "A Little More Country Than That", Easton Corbin
- Music Video of the Year – "Hillbilly Bone", Blake Shelton feat. Trace Adkins
- Female Music Video of the Year – "Cowboy Casanova", Carrie Underwood
- Male Music Video of the Year – "Hillbilly Bone", Blake Shelton feat. Trace Adkins
- Duo/Group Music Video of the Year – "Need You Now", Lady Antebellum
- Breakthrough Music Video of the Year – "A Little More Country Than That", Easton Corbin

=== ARIA Awards ===
(presented in Sydney on November 7, 2010)

- Best Country Album – Wrapped Up Good (The McClymonts)
- ARIA Hall of Fame – John Williamson

=== Canadian Country Music Association ===
(presented September 12 in Edmonton)

- Fans' Choice Award – Johnny Reid
- Male Artist of the Year – Gord Bamford
- Female Artist of the Year – Victoria Banks
- Group or Duo of the Year – Doc Walker
- Songwriter(s) of the Year – "Dance With Me", written by Johnny Reid, Victoria Banks, and Tia Sillers
- Single of the Year – "Dance With Me", Johnny Reid
- Album of the Year – Day Job, Gord Bamford
- Top Selling Album – Fearless, Taylor Swift
- Top Selling Canadian Album – Dance with Me, Johnny Reid
- CMT Video of the Year – "Day Job", Gord Bamford
- Rising Star Award – One More Girl
- Roots Artist or Group of the Year – Corb Lund

=== Country Music Association ===
(presented November 10 in Nashville)

- Single of the Year – "Need You Now", Lady Antebellum
- Song of the Year – "The House That Built Me", Tom Douglas and Allen Shamblin
- Vocal Group of the Year – Lady Antebellum
- New Artist of the Year – Zac Brown Band
- Album of the Year – Revolution, Miranda Lambert
- Musician of the Year – Mac McAnally
- Vocal Duo of the Year – Sugarland
- Music Video of the Year – "The House That Built Me", Miranda Lambert
- Male Vocalist of the Year – Blake Shelton
- Female Vocalist of the Year – Miranda Lambert
- Musical Event of the Year – "Hillbilly Bone", Blake Shelton and Trace Adkins
- Entertainer of the Year – Brad Paisley

=== CMT Music Awards ===
(presented June 9 in Nashville)

- Video of the Year – "Cowboy Casanova", Carrie Underwood
- Male Video of the Year – "'Til Summer Comes Around", Keith Urban
- Female Video of the Year – "White Liar", Miranda Lambert
- Group Video of the Year – "Need You Now", Lady Antebellum
- Duo Video of the Year – "Indian Summer", Brooks & Dunn
- USA Weekend Breakthrough Video of the Year – "Do I", Luke Bryan
- Collaborative Video of the Year – "Hillbilly Bone", Blake Shelton and Trace Adkins
- Performance of the Year – "Temporary Home", Carrie Underwood, from CMT Invitation Only
- Video Director of the Year – Shaun Silva
- Nationwide Is On Your Side Award – Chris Young

CMT Artists of the Year
(presented December 1 in Nashville)

- Jason Aldean
- Lady Antebellum
- Taylor Swift
- Carrie Underwood
- Zac Brown Band

=== Grammy Awards ===
(presented February 13, 2011)

- Best Female Country Vocal Performance – "The House That Built Me", Miranda Lambert
- Best Male Country Vocal Performance – "'Til Summer Comes Around", Keith Urban
- Best Country Performance by a Duo or Group with Vocals – "Need You Now", Lady Antebellum
- Best Country Collaboration with Vocals – "As She's Walking Away", Zac Brown Band and Alan Jackson
- Best Country Instrumental Performance – "Hummingbyrd", Marty Stuart
- Best Country Song – "Need You Now", Dave Haywood, Josh Kear, Charles Kelley and Hillary Scott
- Best Country Album – Need You Now, Lady Antebellum
- Best Bluegrass Album – Mountain Soul II, Patty Loveless

=== Juno Awards ===
(presented March 27, 2011 in Toronto)

- Country Album of the Year – A Place Called Love, Johnny Reid

=== Hollywood Walk of Fame ===
stars who were honored in 2010

Alan Jackson

=== Kennedy Center Honors ===
Country stars who were honored in 2010

Merle Haggard

== Other links ==
- Country Music Association
- Inductees of the Country Music Hall of Fame
