= Greatest Hits (Gretchen Wilson album) =

Greatest hits album by Gretchen Wilson
- Released: January 19, 2010
- Recorded: 2004–2007
- Genre: Country
- Length: 39:10
- Label: Columbia Nashville
- Producer: John Rich; Joe Scaife; Gretchen Wilson; Mark Wright

Gretchen Wilson chronology
One of the Boys (2007)	Greatest Hits (2010)	I Got Your Country Right Here (2010)

Greatest Hits is the first compilation album by American country music singer Gretchen Wilson. It was released on January 19, 2010, via Columbia Nashville. The album features all of Wilson's top 40 hits and a live cover of Heart's 1977 hit "Barracuda". The album's release was announced after Wilson had parted ways with Columbia Nashville in mid-2009 to begin her own record label, Redneck Records.

== Content ==
The compilation opens up with Wilson's signature hit and number one country hit "Redneck Woman", from her debut album Here for the Party (2004). The next song to follow up is the title track, which was a top three hit on the Hot Country Songs chart (then known as "Hot Country Singles & Tracks"). "Homewrecker" follows after, which peaked at number two. "When I Think About Cheatin'", one of the four top five hits from Here for the Party, is the final single included from the album.

"California Girls" is the song that follows after, which was the final single from her sophomore album All Jacked Up (2005). The Merle Haggard duet "Politically Uncorrect" is next, which is also the first song in Greatest Hits that Wilson did not co-wrote. After is "I Don't Feel Like Loving You Today", which was Wilson's first single to miss the top ten on the country charts.

"One of the Boys" is one of two tracks from her 2007 album of the same name included on Greatest Hits. "Come to Bed", a duet with frequent collaborator John Rich, was the other included. Both singles barely scraped into the top 40 at country radio. The final previously released song from the compilation is "All Jacked Up", the title track to All Jacked Up, which is noted for its record-breaking debut at number 21 on Hot Country Songs when it debuted. The final song and only new song included on Greatest Hits is a live version of "Barracuda" by rock band Heart, which Wilson has performed a few times. The only single excluded from the compilation is "You Don't Have to Go Home" from One of the Boys, which was Wilson's only single at the time of its release to miss the top forty.

== Critical reception ==
Professional ratings
Review scores
Source	Rating
AllMusic	4/5 stars

The release of Greatest Hits was sudden and not promoted, so it received very little reception from critics. The one review from Thom Jurek of AllMusic gave the record a positive review. Although noting how premature of a greatest hits album in Wilson's career was, he did praise the record for having all her hits, and noted the "killer live rendition" of "Barracuda". He gave the record 4 out of 5 stars.

== Track listing ==
No.	Title	Writer(s)	Original Album	Length
1.	"Redneck Woman"	John Rich, Gretchen Wilson	Here for the Party	3:42
2.	"Here for the Party"	Rich, Big Kenny, Wilson	Here for the Party	3:16
3.	"Homewrecker"	George Teren, Rivers Rutherford, Wilson	Here for the Party	3:27
4.	"When I Think About Cheatin'"	Rich, Wilson, Vicky McGehee	Here for the Party	4:09
5.	"California Girls"	Wilson, Rich	All Jacked Up	2:49
6.	"Politically Uncorrect" (featuring Merle Haggard)	Leslie Satcher, Danny Steagall, Billy Henderson	All Jacked Up	3:23
7.	"I Don't Feel Like Loving You Today"	Matraca Berg, Jim Collins	All Jacked Up	2:45
8.	"One of the Boys"	Teren, Rutherford, Wilson	One of the Boys	3:37
9.	"Come to Bed" (featuring John Rich)	Rich, McGehee	One of the Boys	3:54
10.	"All Jacked Up"	Wilson, Rich, McGehee	All Jacked Up	3:32
11.	"Barracuda" (live recording)	Ann Wilson, Nancy Wilson, Michael DeRosier, Sue Ennis, Roger Fisher	2010 - Previously Unreleased	4:30
Total length:				39:10

== Chart performance ==
Chart (2010)	Peak position
U.S. Billboard Top Country Albums	24
U.S. Billboard 200	168
