= Kennon =

Kennon may refer to:

== Places ==
- Kennon Island, a 0.3-mi-long satellite of Attu Island in the Near Islands group at the extreme western end of the Aleutian Islands, Alaska
- Kennon Observatory, astronomical observatory owned and operated by the University of Mississippi
- Kennon Road, a roadway in Benguet province, Philippines, connecting the mountain city of Baguio to the lowland town of Rosario in La Union province
- Kennon, Virginia, unincorporated community in Charles City County, Virginia, United States

== Persons with the surname ==
- Beverley Kennon (1793–1844), career officer in the United States Navy
- James Kennon (1925–1991), British naval officer
- Kevin Kennon (born 1958), American architect
- Lyman W. V. Kennon (1858–1918), American military officer
- Matt Kennon, American singer and songwriter
- Paul A. Kennon (1934–1990), American architect
- Robert F. Kennon (1902–1988), American politician
- Sandy Kennon (1933–2015), South African footballer
- Sidney Kennon (died 1754), British midwife
- William Kennon (disambiguation), two persons
- Wilson S. Kennon (1826–1895), American politician

== Persons with the given name ==
- Robert Kennon Hargrove (1829–1905), American bishop
- Kennon Richard Lewis (born 1939), Australian politician
- William Kennon Mayo (1824–1900), American naval officer
- Kennon Sheldon, American professor
- Kennon C. Whittle (1891–1967), American lawyer and judge

== See also ==
- Matt Kennon (album), the self-titled debut album of American country music singer Matt Kennon
- Justice Kennon (disambiguation)
