= William Kennon =

William Kennon may refer to:

- William Kennon Jr. (1802–1867), lawyer, judge, and a U.S. Representative from Ohio, cousin of William Kennon Sr.
- William Kennon Sr. (1793–1881), U.S. Representative from Ohio, cousin of William Kennon Jr.

== See also ==
- William Kennon Mayo (1824–1900), United States Navy officer
