= I Got Your Country Right Here =

Studio album by Gretchen Wilson
- Released: March 30, 2010
- Studios: Sony/Tree (Nashville, Tennessee); Studio 815 (Nashville, Tennessee); Studio 27 (Lebanon, Tennessee)
- Genres: Country; Southern rock
- Length: 36:45
- Label: Redneck
- Producers: John Rich; Blake Chancey; Gretchen Wilson

Gretchen Wilson chronology
Greatest Hits (2010)	I Got Your Country Right Here (2010)	Playlist: The Very Best of Gretchen Wilson (2012)

Singles from I Got Your Country Right Here
- 1. "Work Hard, Play Harder" Released: October 26, 2009; 2. "I Got Your Country Right Here" Released: August 16, 2010; 3. "I'd Love to Be Your Last" Released: January 31, 2011

Professional ratings
Review scores
Source	Rating
Allmusic	4/5 stars

I Got Your Country Right Here is the fourth studio album by American country music artist Gretchen Wilson. It was released on March 30, 2010, through Redneck Records, her own label. It was her first album since One of the Boys (2007) and her first as an independent artist following her departure from Columbia Nashville in early 2009. Wilson co-produced the album with long-time collaborator John Rich alongside new collaborator Blake Chancey. Unlike her previous three studio albums, Wilson had very little input in the writing, co-writing only two of the eleven tracks.

The album was initially slated for a 2008 release, with "Don't Do Me No Good" serving as the lead single from the album. After the song failed to perform well on the charts, the album was delayed and the song excluded from the album. Three official singles were released, with "Work Hard, Play Harder" being the most successful. It peaked at number 18 on the US Hot Country Songs chart, making it her highest-charting single since 2005's "All Jacked Up" peaked at number eight. The title track and "I'd Love to Be Your Last" both serviced as the second and third singles, both of which failed to enter the top forty of the chart.

The album peaked at number six on the Top Country Albums chart, becoming her first album to miss the top spot. It was however a success on the Independent Albums chart, peaking at number three.

== Background ==
In an interview with The Boot in November 2009, Wilson was asked to describe her fourth studio album, saying, "I feel like I've invested a lot of time and thought and energy and emotions into this record. I feel like I sang better on this record than I ever have. Musically, it sounds just like it should, just like I want it to, just like my live show." She also thought that the album had more of a "connection with the audience" then her previous efforts.

Wilson, via her website, called I Got Your Country Right Here as the 'album of her career', stating: "This is the album of my career; This album turns the page for me. I'm proud of every song on here, and I'm excited about the team we've put together to get this music out to the fans."

I Got Your Country Right Here is also the first release for Wilson's personal label, Redneck Records, which she founded after leaving Sony Music Nashville's Columbia Nashville division in 2009.

"I'd Love to Be Your Last" was previously recorded by Clay Walker on his 2007 album Fall and later recorded by Marie Osmond and Marty Roe of Diamond Rio for Osmond's 2016 album Music Is Medicine.

== Critical reception ==
Thom Jurek of Allmusic rated the album four stars out of five, saying that it showed her Southern rock influences and that it "rocks nearly as hard as her live shows and [proves] that she is not an industry-constructed image — she’s exactly who she’s portrayed herself to be all along."

== Track listing ==
No.	Title	Writer(s)	Length
1.	"I Got Your Country Right Here"	Tom Hambridge; Jeffrey Steele	3:15
2.	"Work Hard, Play Harder"	Wilson; Vicky McGehee; John Rich; Chris Robinson; Rich Robinson	3:10
3.	"I'm Only Human"	McGehee; Rivers Rutherford	3:40
4.	"The Earrings Song"	Monty Criswell; Rutherford	2:54
5.	"Trucker Man"	Rodney Clawson; McGehee; Rich	3:00
6.	"Blue Collar Done Turn Red"	Wilson; Dallas Davidson	3:04
7.	"Outlaws and Renegades"	Terry McBride; Chris Stapleton	3:52
8.	"Walk on Water"	Bob DiPiero; Hambridge; Steele	3:31
9.	"Love on the Line"	Stapleton	3:48
10.	"As Far as You Know"	Bekka Bramlett; Bobby Terry	2:57
11.	"I'd Love to Be Your Last"	Rutherford; Annie Tate; Sam Tate	3:34
Total length:			36:45

== Personnel ==
- Gretchen Wilson – lead vocals, backing vocals
- Pat Buchanan – electric guitars, slide guitar
- J.T. Corenflos – electric guitars
- Mark Oakley – electric guitars
- Adam Shoenfeld – electric guitars
- Danny Rader – acoustic guitars, mandolin
- Rivers Rutherford – acoustic guitars
- Mike Brignardello – bass guitar
- Shannon Forrest – drums, percussion
- Paul Nelson – cello
- Jonathan Yudkin – cello, fiddle
- Wes Hightower – backing vocals
- Cherie Oakley – backing vocals
- Chris Stapleton – backing vocals

=== Production ===
- Gretchen Wilson – producer
- Blake Chauncey – producer (1, 3, 4, 6, 8–12), additional engineer
- John Rich – producer (2, 5, 7)
- Bart Pursley – recording, mixing
- Ryan Nelson – mixing, additional engineer, art direction, design, photography
- PJ Fenech – recording assistant
- Brandon Perdue – recording assistant, production coordinator
- Tony Castle – additional engineer
- Mel Eubanks – additional engineer
- Bob Ludwig – mastering at Gateway Mastering (Portland, Maine)
- David McClister – photography
- Kurt Nelson – photography
- Dennis Willis – photography
- Candy Smathers – hair, make-up
- Dale Morris – management

== Chart performance ==
=== Album ===
I Got Your Country Right Here debuted at number 6 on the U.S. Billboard Top Country Albums chart and at number 34 on the U.S. Billboard 200, selling 14,753 copies in its first week. It reached 43,309 copies by June 6, 2010, and has sold 71,000 copies as of February 2013.

Chart (2010)	Peak position
U.S. Billboard Top Country Albums	6
U.S. Billboard 200	34
U.S. Billboard Independent Albums	3

=== Singles ===
Year	Single	Peak chart positions	
Year	Single	US Country	US Bubbling
2009	"Work Hard, Play Harder"	18	15
2010	"I Got Your Country Right Here"	53	—
2011	"I'd Love to Be Your Last"	47	—
"—" denotes releases that did not chart
