= Till the End (Vern Gosdin song) =

Single by Vern Gosdin

from the album Till the End
- Released: June 1977
- Recorded: 1976
- Genre: Country
- Length: 2:47
- Label: Elektra
- Songwriter(s): Vern Gosdin, Cathy Gosdin

Vern Gosdin singles chronology
"Yesterday's Gone" (1977)	"Till the End" (1977)	"Mother Country Music" (1977)

"Till the End" is a song co-written and recorded by American country music artist Vern Gosdin. It was released in June 1977 as the third single and title track from his album of the same name. Janie Fricke was the featured female vocalist on the track. The song reached No. 7 on the Billboard Hot Country Singles chart in August 1977. Gosdin wrote the song with his then-wife Cathy.

More than 30 years later, Alan Jackson recorded a cover version of "Till the End" for his 2010 album Freight Train. It is a duet recorded with Lee Ann Womack.

== Charts ==
=== Weekly charts ===
Chart (1977)	Peak position
US Hot Country Songs (Billboard)	7
Canadian RPM Country Tracks	37

=== Year-end charts ===
Chart (1977)	Position
US Hot Country Songs (Billboard)	47
