= USS Kanawha (1861) =

Gunboat of the United States Navy

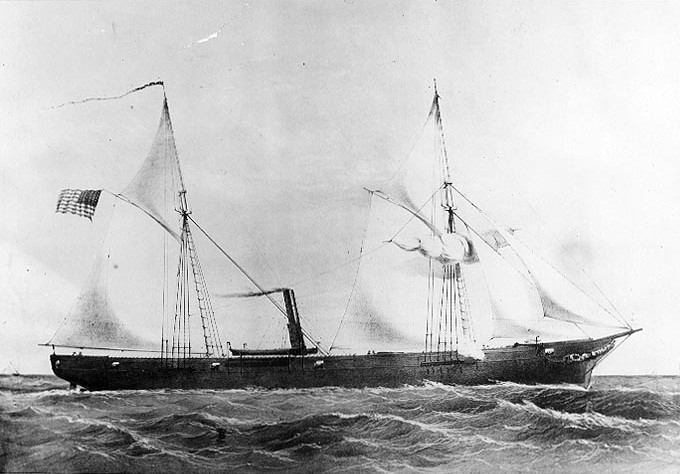
- Lithograph by Shearman & Hart, New York, circa 1861, entitled "U.S. Steam Gun Boat Kanawha. Built by C.E. & W.H. Goodspeed. East Haddam, Connecticut".

History

United States
- Name: USS Kanawha
- Namesake: Kanawha River
- Builder: G. B. & W. H. Goodspeed, East Haddam, Connecticut
- Laid down: date unknown
- Launched: 21 October 1861
- Commissioned: 21 January 1862 at the New York Navy Yard
- Decommissioned: 5 July 1865
- Stricken: 1866 (est.)
- Fate: Sold at New York City 13 June 1866

General characteristics
- Class & type: Unadilla-class gunboat
- Displacement: 691 tons
- Tons burthen: 507
- Length: 158 ft (48 m) (waterline)
- Beam: 28 ft (8.5 m)
- Draft: 9 ft 6 in (2.90 m) (max.)
- Depth of hold: 12 ft (3.7 m)
- Propulsion: 2 × 200 IHP 30-in bore by 18 in stroke horizontal back-acting engines; single screw
- Sail plan: Two-masted schooner
- Speed: 10 knots (19 km/h; 12 mph)
- Complement: 114
- Armament: Original: 1 × 11-in Dahlgren smoothbore; 2 × 24-pdr smoothbore; 2 × 20-pdr Parrott rifle

USS Kanawha was a Unadilla-class gunboat built for the Union Navy during the American Civil War. She was used by the navy to patrol navigable waterways of the Confederacy to prevent the South from trading with other countries.

== Commissioned at New York City ==
Kanawha was launched on 21 October 1861 by G. B. & W. H. Goodspeed, East Haddam, Connecticut; and commissioned at New York Navy Yard on 21 January 1862, Lt. John C. Febiger in command.

== Civil War service ==
=== Assigned to the Gulf Blockade ===
Assigned to the Gulf Blockading Squadron, the new gunboat arrived off Pass a l'Outre, Louisiana, on 13 February, and a week later was ordered to take station off Mobile, Alabama, where she soon distinguished herself for vigilance.

=== Kanawha proves very efficient at capturing blockade runners ===
She drew first blood with a vengeance on 10 April by capturing four blockade-running schooners in a single day: Southern Independence, Victoria, Charlotte, and Cuba. The first three had attempted to slip to sea laden with cotton and naval stores while the latter had tried to run into Mobile, Alabama, with supplies badly needed by the South.

Thereafter, her kills were frequent. She caught schooner R. C. Files carrying cotton out of Mobile on 21 April and took British sloop Annie on the 29th between Ship Island and Mobile headed for Cuba. On 17 November near Mobile she and Kennebec chased an unidentified schooner ashore where she was set afire by her crew. Then the guns of the Union ships assured her complete destruction by preventing Confederate coast guards from boarding her to extinguish the flames.

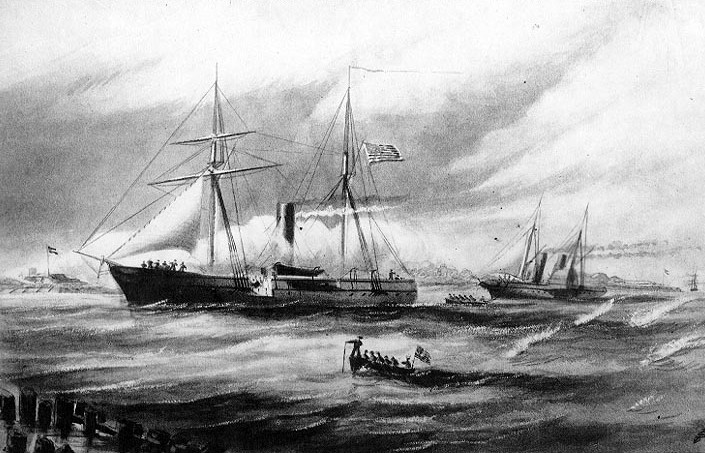
Kanawha "cutting out a blockade runner from under the guns of Fort Morgan", at the mouth of Mobile Bay.

On 25 March 1863 Kanawha, then commanded by Lieutenant Commander William K. Mayo, took the schooner Clara attempting to run the blockade at Mobile. The schooner Dart attempted to slip into Mobile from Havana, Cuba, on 1 May but fell prey to this vigilant blockader. A fortnight later the same fate befell British brig Comet some 20 miles east of Fort Morgan on Mobile Point. On 17 May Kanawha snared schooner Hunter, laden with cotton for Havana, running out of Mobile. The next day she caught schooner Ripple attempting the same feat.

=== Kanawha is hulled by a cannonball from Fort Morgan, and smartly backs off ===
Dawn of 12 October disclosed the steamer Alice aground under the guns of Fort Morgan and an unidentified Confederate tug attempting to pull her free. Kanawha, accompanied by the tender Eugenie, steamed boldly toward the strongly defended Confederate shore to destroy the Southern vessels; but Fort Morgan's batteries, outranging the guns of the Union ships, hulled Kanawha, forcing the Union ships to retire. Lackawanna and Genesee then headed in to finish the task with their 150-pounders; but, before they got in range, the daring tug managed to refloat Alice and escaped with her into Mobile Bay.

=== Undermining the South’s financial structure ===
On 29 November Kanawha took the schooner Albert, also called Wenona, attempting to carry cotton, naval stores, and tobacco out of Mobile. The toll collected by relentless Northern blockaders like Kanawha in capturing Southern blockade runners steadily drained away the life blood of the Confederacy. The loss of ships carrying the products of Southern fields and forests to foreign markets undermined the South's financial structure and increased her difficulty in purchasing war material abroad. The loss of incoming ships deprived Southern armies of a growing proportion of the shrinking supplies and equipment persuasive Confederate agents did manage to procure.

=== Reassigned to patrolling the Texas coast ===
In the spring of 1864 Kanawha was transferred to the Texas coast. On 8 July, now under Lieutenant Commander. Bushrod B. Taylor, she forced steamer Matagorda aground near Galveston, Texas. On 9 September, after Union troops had been withdrawn from the area, Kanawha reinstituted the blockade of Brownsville, Texas, which had been lifted by Presidential proclamation in mid-February. On 28 December she forced an unidentified sloop ashore near Caney Creek, Texas, and destroyed her. She captured Mary Ellen of Montreal, Canada, on 3 January 1865 as the schooner tried to run into Velasco, Texas. She remained on blockade duty until after the end of the war and was ordered north on 27 May.

== Post-war decommissioning and sale ==
Kanawha was decommissioned on 5 July and was sold at New York on 13 June 1866.
