= You Don't Have to Go Home =

Single by Gretchen Wilson

from the album One of the Boys
- Released: October 1, 2007
- Genre: Country; Honky tonk
- Length: 3:17
- Label: Columbia Nashville
- Songwriters: Gretchen Wilson; Vicky McGehee; John Rich
- Producers: Gretchen Wilson; John Rich; Mark Wright

Gretchen Wilson singles chronology
"One of the Boys" (2007)	"You Don't Have to Go Home" (2007)	"Don't Do Me No Good" (2008)

"You Don't Have to Go Home" is a song by American country music artist Gretchen Wilson. The song was written by Wilson, Vicky McGehee, and John Rich and produced by Wilson, Rich, and Mark Wright. The song was released on October 1, 2007, by Columbia Nashville as the third and final single from Wilson's third studio album One of the Boys (2007). The song describes a bartender closing up shop and telling all the patrons to leave.

It was Wilson's first single to miss the top 40 of the US Hot Country Songs chart.

== Critical reception ==
In album reviews, "You Don't Have to Go Home" received favorable reviews from music critics. In a review for The Austin Chronicle, they gave the single a positive reception and called it a "recount of her barmaid past." In his review, Robert Christgau noted the song as a highlight from One of the Boys along with "If You Want a Mother". In an overall negative review for Slant Magazine, Jonathan Keefe negatively called the single derivative and said it "didn't hold up in the album's company."

== Commercial performance ==
"You Don't Have to Go Home" debuted at number 60 on the US Hot Country Songs chart the week of October 20, 2007. It reached its peak position of number 53 on the chart on November 3, 2007.

== Charts ==
Chart (2007)	Peak position
US Hot Country Songs (Billboard)	53
