= Freight Train (album) =

Studio album by Alan Jackson
- Released: March 30, 2010
- Genre: Country
- Length: 43:30
- Label: Arista Nashville
- Producer: Keith Stegall

Alan Jackson chronology
Songs of Love and Heartache (2009)	Freight Train (2010)	34 Number Ones (2010)

Singles from Freight Train
- 1. "It's Just That Way" Released: January 4, 2010; 2. "Hard Hat and a Hammer" Released: May 3, 2010

Freight Train is the sixteenth studio album by American country music artist Alan Jackson. It was released on March 30, 2010. The album's first single, "It's Just That Way", was released on January 4, 2010.

== Background ==
Freight Train is the last album in Jackson's contract with Arista Nashville, the label to which he has been signed since 1989. He told Great American Country that, even though it is his last Arista album, he has no plans to retire.

On January 11, 2010, Linda Ryan of "Rhapsody Blog" posted an article named "Most Anticipated Country Albums of 2010", where she included Jackson's Freight Train saying "There are few things in this world more sublime than Alan Jackson singing a slow-burning love song. With his deep, buttery voice, Jackson sounds exceptional when extolling the virtues of love; his new single, "It's Just That Way," is a three-and-a-half-minute slice of romantic bliss. A new Jackson release is always good news for country music lovers, and if the songs on his upcoming album are half as good as this one, the singer will have hit another home run".

== Critical reception ==
Professional ratings
Review scores
Source	Rating
AllMusic	3/5 stars
BBC Music	(mixed)
Billboard	(favorable)
The Boston Globe	(favorable)
Country Weekly	4/5 stars
Entertainment Weekly	B−
Los Angeles Times	3/4 stars
The New York Times	(average)
PopMatters	8/10 stars

Upon its release, Freight Train received generally positive reviews from most music critics. At Metacritic, which assigns a normalized rating out of 100 to reviews from mainstream critics, the album received an average score of 68, based on 10 reviews, which indicates "generally favorable reviews".

Stephen Thomas Erlewine with AllMusic gave it a three star rating, saying that Freight Train "rolls along comfortably, never pushing at the edges of Jackson’s comfort zone; [it] doesn’t offer a sustained romantic mood along the lines of 2006’s understated gem Like Red on a Rose. Instead, it’s the sound of a major star gently easing away from the spotlight, deciding that he’s so comfortable in his old clothes that there’s no reason to try something new". Randy Lewis with the Los Angeles Times gave it a three star rating, saying "this isn’t as consistently deeply moving nor as stylistically outside-the-box as his Alison Krauss-produced 2006 collection Like Red on a Rose, just down-the-middle country by one of the most dependably rewarding artists that genre has to offer". Dave Heaton with PopMatters gave it an eight star rating saying it "felt like an LP" and continuing saying "as an Alan Jackson album, Freight Train is so consistently likable that it makes me imagine that he might keep getting better over time, as well".

Jessica Phillips of Country Weekly gave the release a four star rating, calling it "quality country music", saying that the album "continues to build on his legacy as a 'singer of simple songs'". Stuart Munro with The Boston Globe called it "a record of slow and midtempo songs", saying "there isn’t anything revelatory or strikingly different here — just the solid, precise craftsmanship of an artist now deep into his career". Ninian Dunnett with BBC Music gave it a mixed review, saying "Buoyantly produced, it finds the singer leaning a little too comfortably on the conversational Georgia drawl of his baritone, and the writer coming up a little shy on the sort of detail and wordplay that lifts a cliché [...] The eight originals compare poorly to the 17 on 2008’s Good Time".

Matt Bjorke with Roughstock gave the release 3½, saying "Ultimately this record is neither groundbreaking nor is it lacking in future radio hits; while many artists are always constantly changing their sound, Alan remains true to what made him a star in the first place. Freight Train may not win Alan many new fans but it’s unlikely to lose him any and in an era when the genre is getting more rock-n-roll and pop, Alan is remarkably retro or ‘traditional’ here". Jon Caramanica with The New York Times called it "calm" and said "Freight Train is filled with songs that are mature but not wise".

== Commercial performance ==
Freight Train debuted at number seven on the U.S. Billboard 200 and number two on the Top Country Albums, selling 72,000 copies in its opening week. It's his first album since 1999's Under the Influence not to debut at #1 on the Billboard Country Albums Chart. As of July 3, 2010, the album has sold 168,547 copies in the U.S.

== Track listing ==
All songs written by Alan Jackson except where noted.

No.	Title	Writer(s)	Length
1.	"Hard Hat and a Hammer"		2:50
2.	"Every Now and Then"		3:49
3.	"After 17"		3:52
4.	"It's Just That Way"	Vicky McGehee, Kylie Sackley, Keith Stegall	3:26
5.	"Freight Train"	Fred Eaglesmith	4:41
6.	"Taillights Blue"	Jay Knowles, Adam Wright	3:47
7.	"I Could Get Used to This Lovin' Thing"		3:21
8.	"Till the End" (featuring Lee Ann Womack)	Vern Gosdin, Cathy Gosdin	3:04
9.	"That's Where I Belong"		3:51
10.	"Big Green Eyes"		3:30
11.	"True Love Is a Golden Ring"	Jackson, Roger Murrah	3:35
12.	"The Best Keeps Getting Better"		3:44
Total length:			43:30

== Personnel ==
Technical

- Tracy Baskette-Fleaner – art direction, design
- Judy Forde-Blair – creative producer, liner notes
- Craig Fruin – management
- Russ Harrington – photography
- Howard Kaufman – management
- John Kelton – engineer, mixing
- Kyle Lehning – engineer
- Scott McDaniel – creative director
- Timothy Monnig – photography
- Matt Rovey – assistant, engineer
- Mellissa Schleicher – stylist
- Steve Short – assistant
- Trish Townsend – grooming
- Hank Williams – mastering

Additional musicians

- Eddie Bayers – drums
- Jimmy Carter – bass guitar
- Stuart Duncan – fiddle, mandolin
- Paul Franklin – steel guitar
- Greenwood Hart – acoustic guitar
- Alan Jackson – lead vocals
- Andy Leftwich – fiddle
- Brent Mason – acoustic guitar, electric guitar
- Gary Prim – Hammond B3 organ, piano, Wurlitzer
- Hargus "Pig" Robbins – piano, Wurlitzer
- Rhonda Vincent – background vocals
- Bruce Watkins – acoustic guitar, banjo
- John Wesley Ryles – background vocals
- Lee Ann Womack – duet vocals on "Till the End"
- Glenn Worf – bass guitar

== Charts ==
=== Weekly charts ===
Chart (2010)	Peak position
Australia Albums Chart	25
Canadian Albums Chart	8
Norwegian Albums Chart	2
Swedish Albums Chart	32
Swiss Albums Chart	65
U.S. Billboard 200	7
U.S. Billboard Top Country Albums	2

=== Year-end charts ===
Chart (2010)	Position
US Billboard 200	194
US Billboard Top Country Albums	34
