= Matt Kennon (album) =

Studio album by Matt Kennon
- Released: May 11, 2010
- Genre: Country
- Label: BamaJam/Stroudavarious
- Producers: Matt Kennon; Chip Martin; Aaron Scherz; Brian Kolb; Julian King; James Stroud

Matt Kennon chronology
Matt Kennon (2010)	77 (2011)

Matt Kennon is the debut studio album by American country music singer Matt Kennon. It was released on May 11, 2010 (see 2010 in country music) via BamaJam Records. The album's first single release is "The Call," which was released in November 2009 and peaked at number 33 on the Billboard Hot Country Songs charts. "You Can Still Wear White" and "Too Loud" were also released as singles, though both failed to chart.

Country Weekly reviewer Jessica Phillips gave the album three-and-a-half stars out of five, saying that Kennon showed a "rocker-with-a-cause image" and had a "distinctive voice," but thought that Kennon's singing "overwhelm[ed]" the song "Then There Was You." Bobby Peacock of Roughstock gave it a five-star rating, comparing it to Jeffrey Steele's solo albums in sound, also praising Kennon's "gritty vocals" and the songwriting.

== Track listing ==
No.	Title	Writer(s)	Length
1.	"Drive It Like You Stole It"	Jami Grooms, Garrett Parris	3:09
2.	"The Man I Used to Be"	Matt Kennon, Rob Crosby	3:47
3.	"The Call"	Kennon, Noah Gordon, Jeremy Campbell	3:57
4.	"Mama Raised the Hell Outta Me"	Kennon, Dan Murph, Brian Gene White	3:10
5.	"If I Was Any Kind of Man"	Kennon, Aaron Scherz	3:52
6.	"Ride with Me"	Kennon, Jan Linville, Chip Martin	3:27
7.	"Some People Piss Me Off"	Ben Hayslip, Jimmy Yeary	4:04
8.	"Too Loud"	Kennon, Billy Crain, Adam Wheeler	3:28
9.	"Then There Was You"	Kennon, Crosby	3:21
10.	"You Can Still Wear White"	Kennon, Scherz	3:03
11.	"Cry Like Memphis"	Gary Duffey, Ron Wallace	4:28
12.	"That's Love"	Lonnie Williams, Dave Brainard, Kenny Roister	3:42

== Personnel ==
- Dave Brainard – acoustic guitar
- Jim "Moose" Brown – keyboards, piano
- Perry Coleman – background vocals
- Chad Cromwell – drums
- Shannon Forrest – drums
- Paul Franklin – dobro, steel guitar
- Noah Gordon – background vocals
- Kenny Greenberg – electric guitar
- Tania Hancheroff – background vocals
- Tony Harrell – keyboards, organ, piano
- Aubrey Haynie – fiddle, mandolin
- Wes Hightower – background vocals
- Jimi Jamison – background vocals
- Matt Kennon – lead vocals, background vocals
- Julian King – percussion
- Troy Lancaster – electric guitar
- Pat McGrath – acoustic guitar
- Rob McNelley – electric guitar
- Chip Martin – dobro, acoustic guitar, electric guitar, background vocals
- Brent Mason – acoustic guitar, electric guitar
- Duncan Mullins – bass guitar
- Steve Nathan – keyboards, organ, piano
- Larry Paxton – bass guitar
- Mike Payne – electric guitar
- Scotty Sanders – dobro, steel guitar
- Mark Slaughter – electric guitar, background vocals
- Ilya Toshinsky – electric guitar
- Biff Watson – acoustic guitar
- Craig Young – bass guitar

== Chart performance ==
Chart (2010)	Peak position
U.S. Billboard Top Country Albums	19
U.S. Billboard 200	116
U.S. Billboard Top Heatseekers	1
U.S. Billboard Top Independent Albums	24
