= Work Hard, Play Harder =

Single by Gretchen Wilson

from the album I Got Your Country Right Here
- Released: October 26, 2009
- Recorded: 2008
- Genre: Country rock
- Length: 3:09
- Label: Redneck Records
- Songwriters: Vicky McGehee; John Rich; Gretchen Wilson; Chris Robinson; Rich Robinson
- Producers: Blake Chancey; John Rich; Gretchen Wilson

Gretchen Wilson singles chronology
"If I Could Do It All Again" (2009)	"Work Hard, Play Harder" (2009)	"I Got Your Country Right Here" (2010)

"Work Hard, Play Harder" is a song by American country music artist Gretchen Wilson. It was released on October 26, 2009, as the lead single from her fourth studio album, I Got Your Country Right Here (2010), and first to be issued under Wilson's own label, Redneck Records. Wilson co-wrote the song with John Rich and Vicky McGehee and produced it with Rich and Blake Chancey. Chris and Rich Robinson of the Black Crowes were also given credits due to the results of a lawsuit. It reached a peak of number 18 on the Billboard Hot Country Songs chart, becoming Wilson's highest-charting single since "All Jacked Up" in 2005.

== Background ==
In 2009, Wilson formed her own independent record label, Redneck Records, following her departure from Columbia Nashville. "Work Hard, Play Harder" was released as the label's debut single.

== Lawsuit ==
In July 2008, the song was featured in a commercial for the TNT show Saving Grace. Rock band The Black Crowes would file a lawsuit against Wilson. They claimed that Wilson had copied their song "Jealous Again", a 1990 song by the group which peaked at number five on the Mainstream Rock chart. This lawsuit also covered her then label Columbia Nashville, J. Money Music (her publishing company) and the TNT network. The group's manager, Pete Angelus, said he found the verses to be "such an obvious example of copyright infringement" and that he expected all parties to reach a "relatively quick resolution to avoid litigation." The lawsuit would eventually be settled out of court for an undisclosed amount of money. This also led Black Crowes members Chris Robinson and Rich Robinson to be given writer's credits on the song.

== Critical reception ==
The song has received mixed reception among music critics. Juli Thanki of Engine 145 gave the song a thumbs down, noted that while "it is catchy, and far from horrible," the song was too similar in theme to several of Wilson's previous singles. Matt Bjorke of Roughstock positively described the song as "the perfect kind of song to play while driving to and from work or getting ready to go out on the weekend." He also thought that it would re-capture Wilson's fanbase. Leeann Ward of Country Universe gave the song a B− rating, describing its theme and production as an "inferior carbon copy" of her debut single "Redneck Woman." She felt that although Wilson is a "decidedly talented artist," she should be free to make better music now on her own record label.

== Commercial performance ==
"Work Hard, Play Harder" debuted on the US Hot Country Songs chart the week of November 14, 2009, at number 56. It reached a peak position of number 18 on the chart the week of June 26, 2010, becoming her highest-charting single since "All Jacked Up" peaked at number eight in 2005. It spent 33 weeks in total on the chart, becoming her longest charting song.

== Music video ==
The music video for the song, directed by Deaton-Flanigen Productions, premiered on CMT on October 13, 2009. In the video, Wilson is shown driving through the countryside, standing beside a barn with a projector screen showing footage of her previous music videos; The Saving Grace version of the video features scenes from the show on the projector screen instead of her music videos and performing with her band in the evening at an outdoor concert.

== Charts ==
Chart (2009–2010)	Peak position
Canada Country (Billboard)	28
US Bubbling Under Hot 100 (Billboard)	15
US Hot Country Songs (Billboard)	18
