= It's Just That Way =

Single by Alan Jackson

from the album Freight Train
- Released: January 4, 2010
- Genre: Country
- Length: 3:04
- Label: Arista Nashville
- Songwriters: Vicky McGehee; Kylie Sackley; Keith Stegall
- Producer: Keith Stegall

Alan Jackson singles chronology
"I Still Like Bologna" (2009)	"It's Just That Way" (2010)	"Hard Hat and a Hammer" (2010)

Alternative cover
- Alternate single cover

"It's Just That Way" is a song written by Vicky McGehee, Kylie Sackley and Keith Stegall, and recorded by American country music artist Alan Jackson. It was released on January 4, 2010, as the lead-off single to his sixteenth studio album Freight Train, which was released on March 30, 2010.

== Content ==
"It's Just That Way" is a country ballad, backed primarily with steel guitar and piano fills. The song's male narrator compares common occurrences in everyday life ("That ol' sun comes up every mornin'" / "And goes back down at the end of every day") to his assurance to always love his woman. He concludes by stating that he doesn't have any explanation for this, and that "it's just that way."

== Critical reception ==
Engine 145 reviewer Karlie Justus gave the song a thumbs up, describing favorably that "his emphasis on the two-line chorus contrasts with the song’s easy-going feel, showing there’s something below his matter-of-fact surface." Justus stated that while there is "nothing particularly ground breaking or surprising in its execution," she concluded that it "marks a welcome return to the artist that created Precious Memories and Like Red on a Rose." Matt Bjorke of Roughstock reviewed the song positively, referring to it as "Alan Jackson at his best, charmingly laid-back as he sings a straight-up steel guitar laced ballad." He compared the song favorably to "Remember When" and noted that the production was "supurb [sic] as usual."

== Chart performance ==
"It's Just That Way" debuted at number 50 on the U.S. Billboard Hot Country Songs chart for the week of December 26, 2009, and reached a peak of number 16 for the chart week of April 17, 2010.

Chart (2010)	Peak position
Canada Country (Billboard)	17
US Hot Country Songs (Billboard)	16
US Billboard Bubbling Under Hot 100	3
