= Justice Kennon =

Justice Kennon may refer to:

- Robert F. Kennon (1902–1988), associate justice of the Louisiana Supreme Court
- William Kennon Sr. (1793–1881), associate justice of the Ohio Supreme Court
