= Right on Time (Gretchen Wilson album) =

Studio album by Gretchen Wilson
- Released: April 2, 2013
- Genre: Country; alternative country
- Length: 46:50
- Label: Redneck
- Producer: Gretchen Wilson; "One Good Friend" produced by Blake Chancey

Gretchen Wilson chronology
Playlist: The Very Best of Gretchen Wilson (2012)	Right on Time (2013)	Under the Covers (2013)

Singles from Right on Time
- 1. "One Good Friend" Released: June 5, 2012; 2. "Still Rollin'" Released: February 18, 2013; 3. "Crazy" Released: July 8, 2013

Right on Time is the fifth studio album by country music recording artist Gretchen Wilson. It album was released on April 2, 2013 via Redneck Records. "Still Rollin'" was released on February 18, 2013 and served as the album's lead-off single. "One Good Friend" was also previously released as a single in June 2012, and "Crazy" was released on July 8, 2013 as the album's third single.

== Critical reception ==
Professional ratings
Review scores
Source	Rating
AllMusic	4/5 stars
Country Weekly	B
Got Country Online	4/5 stars
Nashville Country Club	4/5 stars
Roughstock	3.5/5 stars

Right on Time has received generally positive reviews from music critics. Steve Leggett of AllMusic gave the album four stars out of five and said that the "aptly named Right on Time shows that Wilson is capable of much more than just country honky tonk anthems, and in fact, this set is way more garage rock blues than it is country, with some late-night jazz, soul, and funk thrown in as well, and it's clearly a statement that Wilson isn't about to sit still musically." At Country Weekly, Tammy Ragusa graded the album a B, which means it is an "above average" release, and evoked how Gretchen Wilson "definitely showcases an artist more comfortable in her skin and confident in her musical choices." Phyllis Hunter of Got Country Online alluded to how this album "seems to have a little bit of everything that Wilson has been thru, and like her, it is tough and cool…but there is a lot of heart under it all." Nashville Country Club's Robbie Huff affirmed that "whether it be rock, blues, country, soul, or funk, whatever this album is it is good. The pacing of the album is done very well. Never does the album seem to repeat its vibe or even its tempo. It bounces seamlessly from hard rock to slow piano driven jazz. It would seem that Gretchen Wilson is back, and she is 'Right On Time.'" Matt Bjorke of Roughstock awarded the album three-and-a-half stars out of five, expressing that Right on Time "doesn't find Wilson chasing trends anymore." He complimented Wilson's "natural soulful voice" and the variety of songs offered on the album.

== Track listing ==
Track list
No.	Title	Writer(s)	Length
1.	"Get Outta My Yard"	Brandy Clark; Shane McAnally; Kacey Musgraves	3:02
2.	"Still Rollin'"	Gretchen Wilson; Vicky McGehee	4:41
3.	"Grandma"	Jon Nicholson	4:20
4.	"Crazy"	Brian Davis; Rachel Farley; McGehee	3:34
5.	"The Well Run Dry"	Jim Beavers; Leslie Satcher	3:07
6.	"The Gypsy in Me"	Bekka Bramlett; John Scott Sherrill	4:49
7.	"Dust & Bone"	Anthony Krizan; Steve Pasch; Bruce Wallace	2:52
8.	"Right on Time"	Al Anderson; Sharon Vaughn	3:45
9.	"My Truck" (featuring Josh Malter)	Jayce Hein; Jason Matthews; Pasch	2:51
10.	"One Good Friend"	Bramlett; Billy Burnette; Dennis Morgan	3:28
11.	"I've Been in Love"	Greg Barnhill; Jim Daddario; Jason Deere	3:41
12.	"Hey Love"	Brice Long; Don Sampson	4:17
13.	"Birds of a Feather"	Bramlett; Shawn Carnes; Tommy Sims	2:23
Total length:			46:50

== Personnel ==
- Gretchen Wilson – lead vocals, backing vocals, percussion
- Jeff Armstrong – keyboards, acoustic piano, Hammond B3 organ
- Tony Obrohta – acoustic guitars, electric guitars
- Ryan Wariner – acoustic guitars, electric guitars
- Jeff Lockerman – bass guitar, upright bass
- Ron Gannaway – drums, percussion
- Scott Sweepy Walker – harmonica
- Grace Penner – backing vocals
- Josh Malter – backing vocals on "My Truck"

== Chart performance ==
=== Album ===
Chart (2013)	Peak position
US Billboard 200	91
US Billboard Top Country Albums	24
US Billboard Independent Albums	21

=== Singles ===
Year	Single	Peak positions
Year	Single	US Country Airplay
2012	"One Good Friend"	—
2013	"Still Rollin'"	60
2013	"Crazy"	58
"—" denotes releases that did not chart
