= California Girls (Gretchen Wilson song) =

Single by Gretchen Wilson

from the album All Jacked Up
- Released: June 12, 2006
- Genre: Country pop
- Length: 2:49
- Label: Columbia Nashville
- Songwriter(s): Gretchen Wilson; John Rich
- Producer(s): John Rich; Gretchen Wilson; Mark Wright

Gretchen Wilson singles chronology
"Politically Uncorrect" (2006)	"California Girls" (2006)	"Come to Bed" (2006)

"California Girls" is a song recorded by American country music artist Gretchen Wilson. The song was written by Wilson and John Rich, and produced by the two and Mark Wright. The song was released on June 12, 2006, as the fourth and final single from Wilson's second album All Jacked Up (2005). In the song, AllMusic wrote that Wilson "thumbs her nose at Hollywood excess and body image."

== Critical reception ==
In a review for the Los Angeles Times, Robert Hilburn noted the song as the "radio highlight" and called it one of the most "irresistible singalong country choruses since Garth Brooks's "Friends in Low Places"." In a overall negative review for the album for Slant Magazine, Jonathan Keefe said, "it's a endeavor to try to pick apart what’s wrong with songs like "California Girls," which includes an instantly-dated verse about how Wilson doesn’t care for New York native Paris Hilton." Spin magazine's Jon Caramanica noted how although it celebrated one type of women, it brought down another type. "Class allegiance, it seems, trumps sisterhood," he said.

== Music video ==
The music video features Wilson and her band throughout the beach and in the amusement park inside the pier. The video also features a Paris Hilton look-alike. The video premiered on Great American Country on July 10, 2006.

== Charts ==
=== Weekly charts ===
Chart (2006)	Peak position
US Bubbling Under Hot 100 Singles (Billboard)	21
US Hot Country Songs (Billboard)	25

=== Year-end charts ===
Chart (2006)	Position
US Country (Radio & Records)	94

== Release history ==
Release dates and format(s) for "California Girls"
Region	Date	Format(s)	Label(s)	Ref.
United States	June 12, 2006	Country radio	Columbia Nashville	
