= One of the Boys (Gretchen Wilson song) =

Single by Gretchen Wilson

from the album One of the Boys
- Released: May 14, 2007
- Genre: Country rock
- Length: 3:35
- Label: Columbia Nashville
- Songwriters: Gretchen Wilson; Rivers Rutherford; George Teren
- Producers: Gretchen Wilson; John Rich; Mark Wright

Gretchen Wilson singles chronology
"Come to Bed" (2006)	"One of the Boys" (2007)	"You Don't Have to Go Home" (2007)

"One of the Boys" is a song recorded by American country music artist Gretchen Wilson. It is the title track to her third studio album One of the Boys (2007). Wilson wrote the single with Rivers Rutherford and George Teren, the same writing team that wrote her 2005 hit single "Homewrecker". Wilson co-produced the song with John Rich and Mark Wright. It was released by Columbia Nashville as the second single from the album on May 14, 2007.

It was another moderate hit, peaking at number 35 on the US Hot Country Songs chart. No video was made for the single. Wilson performed the single at the 2009 Farm Aid music festival.

== Content ==
The song speaks of the narrator saying that she can do anything a man can do, but that she still has "this little girl inside of me that likes to be treated like a queen." She speaks on how she isn't just "one of the boys".

== Critical reception ==
In an album review, AllMusic noted the title as misleading and called it one of the most personal songs from One of the Boys.

== Charts ==
Chart (2007)	Peak position
US Hot Country Songs (Billboard)	35
