= Kennon Island =

Island in Aleutians West Census Area, Alaska, United States

Coordinates: 52°56′29″N 173°15′9″E

- Kennon Island, off Attu Island, Alaska, U.S.A.
- Interactive map of Kennon Island

Geography
- Location: Alaska

Administration
- United States
- State: Alaska

Kennon Island is located 0.5 miles (0.80 km) east of Attu Station, Alaska in Chichagof Harbor. It is a 0.3 miles (0.48 km) long satellite of Attu Island in the Near Islands group at the extreme western end of the Aleutian Islands, Alaska.

Named by Lt. William Gibson in July 1855 for Lt. Beverley Kennon, U.S. Navy. Lt. Kennon served with Lt. Gibson on the schooner USS Fenimore Cooper during the North Pacific Exploring and Surveying Expedition of 1854-1855 under the command of captains Cadwalader Ringgold and John Rodgers.
