= Jim Collins (singer) =

American country music singer-songwriter

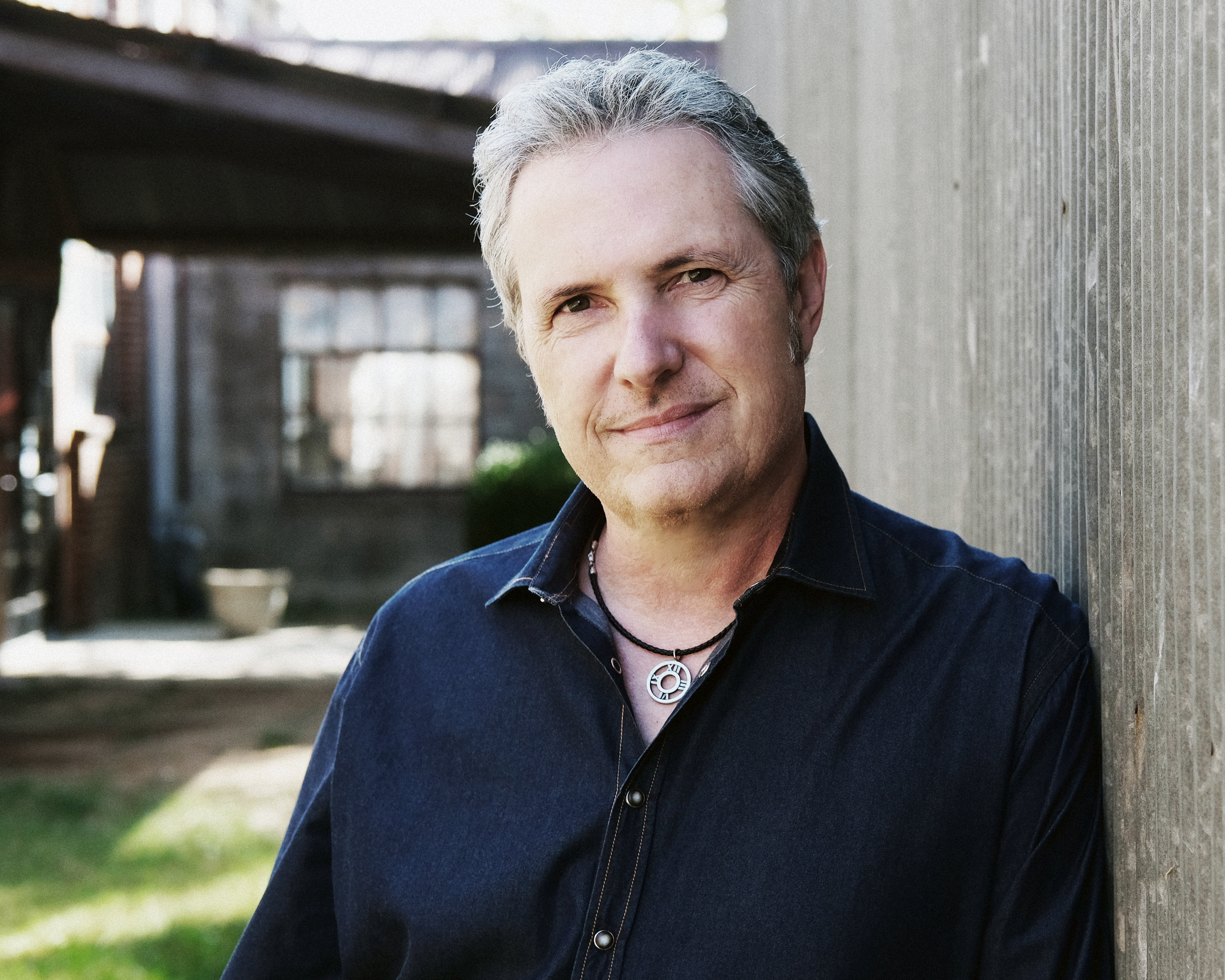

Background information
- Born: June 19, 1956 (age 70)
- Origin: Nacogdoches, Texas, U.S.
- Genre: Country
- Occupation: Singer-songwriter
- Instruments: Vocals, guitar
- Years active: 1985–present
- Labels: White Gold, TKM, Zoo, Arista

Jim Collins (born June 19, 1956) is an American country music singer-songwriter. Between 1985 and 1998, Collins released three studio albums. Seven of his singles reached Billboard's Hot Country Songs chart. The highest of these, "The Next Step," peaked at No. 55 in 1997.

As a songwriter, Collins has had 50 of his songs recorded by others, including singles performed by Kenny Chesney ("She Thinks My Tractor's Sexy", "The Good Stuff", "Everybody Wants to Go to Heaven"), Chad Brock ("Yes!"), Jason Aldean ("Big Green Tractor"), and Gretchen Wilson ("I Don't Feel Like Loving You Today") which was nominated for a Grammy Award for Best Country Song. "The Good Stuff" was Billboard's Number One country single for seven weeks of 2002, and it won ASCAP song of the year.

The Thompson Square recording of "Are You Gonna Kiss Me Or Not" was nominated for a Grammy Award for Best Country Song in 2011. In 2014, Easton Corbin's performance of "Baby Be My Love Song" rose to number 3 in the US Country Airplay. In 2020, Collins was inducted into the Texas Heritage Songwriters Hall of Fame.

== Discography ==
=== Albums ===
Title	Album details
The Next Step	Release date: February 24, 1998; Label: Arista Nashville

=== Singles ===
Year	Single	Peak chart positions		Album
Year	Single	US Country	CAN Country	Album
1985	"You Can Always Say Good-Bye in the Morning"^{A}	78	—	—N/a
1985	"I Wanna Be a Cowboy 'Til I Die"^{A}	59	—	—N/a
1985	"What a Memory You'd Make"^{A}	75	—	—N/a
1986	"(Because of You) The Things I've Done to Me"^{A}	65	—	—N/a
1986	"Romance"^{A}	59	—	—N/a
1997	"The Next Step"	55	90	The Next Step
1998	"My First, Last, One and Only"	73	—	The Next Step
"—" denotes releases that did not chart

- ^{A}Credited to Jimmy Collins.

=== Music videos ===
Year	Video	Director
1997	"The Next Step"	Steven Goldmann
