= Hard Hat and a Hammer =

Single by Alan Jackson

from the album Freight Train
- Released: May 3, 2010
- Genre: Country
- Length: 2:50
- Label: Arista Nashville
- Songwriter: Alan Jackson
- Producer: Keith Stegall

Alan Jackson singles chronology
"It's Just That Way" (2010)	"Hard Hat and a Hammer" (2010)	"As She's Walking Away" (2010)

"Hard Hat and a Hammer" is a song written and recorded by American country music artist Alan Jackson. It was released in May 2010 as the second single from his sixteenth studio album Freight Train, which was released on March 30, 2010.

== Content ==
"Hard Hat and a Hammer" is a song which praises blue collar workers in general for their hard work. The song includes the sound of Jackson striking an anvil owned by his father, who died in 2000.

== Critical reception ==
Kyle Ward of Roughstock gave the song three-and-a-half stars out of five, comparing its theme to Zac Brown Band's "Chicken Fried" and Alabama's "40 Hour Week (For a Livin')," but saying that it " ultimately falls short of the down-home charm of the former and the narrative connection of the latter. Still, Jackson makes this an easy, enjoyable listen[.]" Wade Jessen of Billboard, in his review of the album, referred to the song as a "blue-collar tribute[…]which could be a giant radio hit, given the current economic woes in the heartland." Engine 145 reviewer Karlie Justus gave the single a thumbs-up, saying that "Jackson routinely succeeds with spot-on renderings of those aforementioned demographics without succumbing to simply sucking up." Kevin John Coyne, reviewing the song for Country Universe, gave it a B+ rating. He said that it features "a delightful fiddle, rhythmic hammer sounds and typical Keith Stegall production" Coyne also adds that "while it sits precariously on the edge of simply being ear candy, it still works as an unpretentious tribute that is fun and always topically relevant."

== Music video ==
The music video was directed by Theresa Wingert. The video features miners from Stilhouse mining in Benham, Kentucky, workers from the Bayou La Batre, Alabama shipyard, and railroad workers from TRR Railroad in Mobile, Alabama. It was also filmed at paper mills, foundries, taxi stands, Nashville’s Fire Station #16 and Bar-B-Cutie and more than a dozen other locations. It premiered on June 18, 2010.

== Chart performance ==
"Hard Hat and a Hammer" debuted at number 57 on the U.S. Billboard Hot Country Songs chart for the week of May 1, 2010. It later reached a peak of number 17 on the chart. To date, this is Jackson's last single to reach the top 20.

Chart (2010)	Peak position
US Hot Country Songs (Billboard)	17
US Billboard Bubbling Under Hot 100	7
Canada Country (Billboard)	11
Canada Hot 100 (Billboard)	99
