= Come to Bed =

Single by Gretchen Wilson with John Rich

from the album One of the Boys
- Released: October 30, 2006
- Genre: Country
- Length: 3:54
- Label: Columbia Nashville
- Songwriter(s): John Rich; Vicky McGehee
- Producer(s): Mark Wright; John Rich; Gretchen Wilson

Gretchen Wilson singles chronology
"California Girls" (2006)	"Come to Bed" (2006)	"One of the Boys" (2007)

John Rich singles chronology
"Forever Loving You" (2001)	"Come to Bed" (2006)	"Another You" (2009)

"Come to Bed" is a song by American country music artist Gretchen Wilson. The song is a duet with long-time collaborator John Rich. Rich co-wrote the single with Vicky McGehee, while Rich, Wilson, and Mark Wright produced the track. It was released on October 30, 2006, as the lead single from Wilson's third studio album One of the Boys (2007). It is about a couple who fight and the only way to resolve their conflict is in the bedroom. Wilson debuted the single live for the first time at the 2006 CMA Awards, which aired on November 8.

The song peaked at number 32 on the US Hot Country Songs chart.

== Content ==
The song speaks of a couple who fight sometimes. The only way they can resolve their conflicts is to "come to bed".

== Release ==
It was originally released on October 30, 2006 to country radio. It was released as a digital download on March 13, 2007.

A music video was released. It was directed by Deaton-Flanigen Productions and Mark Oswald and premiered on January 26, 2007 on both CMT and GAC.

== Critical reception ==
Billboard magazine gave the single a positive review by saying, "Given her usual beer mug-clinking output, "Come to Bed" is a surprising first single from Wilson's third album. The lyric spools images from a real-life scenario about a domestic dispute, as she sings, "We're both screamin' and nobody's listening". Soaked with the mournful accompaniment of a slide guitar and solid background vocals from fellow MuzikMafia member and co-producer John Rich, the track resembles previous "When I Think About Cheatin'", another McGehee/ Rich collaboration. Wilson proves that singing about an authentic motif fits her image as well as singing about life as a "Redneck Woman". Catchy and fit for country airwaves, here's a radio-ready hit that will leave listeners ready to jump into bed with Wilson. "

== Commercial performance ==
"Come to Bed" debuted on the US Billboard Hot Country Songs chart for the week of November 25, 2006, at number 51, being the second highest debut of the week. It debuted to 1.5 million audience impressions. In its second week, the song rose to number 49. On the final week of 2006, it reached number 48. It reached the top forty for the week of February 10, 2007 at number 38, becoming her tenth consecutive top 40 country hit. It rose to number 36 the following week. It reached its peak position of number 32 on the chart on February 24, 2007, becoming her lowest peaking single as a lead artist; the single "That's How They Do it in Dixie" by Hank Williams Jr., which featured Wilson, Big & Rich, and Van Zant, peaked at number 35 in 2006. It spent twenty weeks in total on the chart.

== Charts ==
Chart (2006–2007)	Peak position
US Hot Country Songs (Billboard)	32
