= All Jacked Up =

Studio album by Gretchen Wilson
- Released: September 27, 2005
- Recorded: 2004–2005
- Studios: Ocean Way (Nashville, Tennessee); Sony/Tree (Nashville, Tennessee); Allen Roadhouse (Clarkston, Michigan)
- Genres: Country; rock
- Length: 41:56 (Standard Edition); 45:30 (Target Bonus Track Version)
- Label: Epic Nashville
- Producers: John Rich; Gretchen Wilson; Mark Wright

Gretchen Wilson chronology
Here for the Party (2004)	All Jacked Up (2005)	One of the Boys (2007)

Singles from All Jacked Up
- 1. "All Jacked Up" Released: August 1, 2005; 2. "I Don't Feel Like Loving You Today" Released: October 22, 2005; 3. "Politically Uncorrect" Released: February 13, 2006; 4. "California Girls" Released: June 12, 2006

Professional ratings
Aggregate scores
Source	Rating
Metacritic	(70/100)
Review scores
Source	Rating
About.com	5/5 stars
AllMusic	4/5 stars
Entertainment Weekly	A−
Los Angeles Times	4/4 stars
PopMatters	6/10 stars
Robert Christgau	(3-star Honorable Mention)
Rolling Stone	2/5 stars
Slant Magazine	1/5 stars
Spin	C+
Stylus Magazine	B+

All Jacked Up is the second studio album by American country music artist Gretchen Wilson, released on September 27, 2005, through Epic Nashville Records. After the massive success of her debut album Here for the Party (2004), Wilson went back into the studio to record its follow-up. Wilson worked with mostly the same team as her debut, with the album being produced by John Rich, Wilson, and Mark Wright.

When it was released, All Jacked Up received positive reviews from music critics but many felt that Wilson was trying "way too hard" to replicate the success of Here for the Party. The album went on to debut atop the Billboard 200 and Top Country Albums charts with 264,000 copies sold first week, Wilson's highest first week sales. Sales for the album started declining due to the poor success of its singles.

"All Jacked Up" served as the lead single from the record on August 1, 2005. It broke the record for the then-highest debut on the US Hot Country Songs chart by a female artist when it debuted at number 21; despite that, the song only peaked at number eight (becoming her last top ten hit to date) and received a mostly-negative reception among country radio. The second single "I Don't Feel Like Loving You Today" became Wilson's first single to miss the top-twenty, peaking at number 22 at country radio. The other singles "Politically Uncorrect", which was a duet with Merle Haggard, and "California Girls" were both moderately received, peaking at numbers 23 and 25; the latter single was released through Columbia Nashville after Epic Records closed its country division. Compared to her debut, All Jacked Up was less successful, only being certified Platinum by the RIAA for shipments of one million copies in the United States.

Also featured on this album are "He Ain't Even Cold Yet" (which was originally recorded by Ken Mellons on his 1995 album Where Forever Begins) and a remake of Billie Holiday's pop standard "Good Morning Heartache".

== Track listing ==
No.	Title	Writer(s)	Length
1.	"All Jacked Up"	Gretchen Wilson; John Rich; Vicky McGehee	3:31
2.	"California Girls"	Wilson; Rich	2:49
3.	"Full Time Job"	Wilson; Monty Criswell; George Teren	3:24
4.	"Skoal Ring"	Wilson; Rich; McGehee	2:50
5.	"He Ain't Even Cold Yet"	Billy Lawson; Cyril Rawson	3:58
6.	"One Bud Wiser"	Rich; McGehee	3:38
7.	"Politically Uncorrect" (featuring Merle Haggard)	Leslie Satcher; Danny Steagall; Billy Henderson	3:23
8.	"I Don't Feel Like Loving You Today"	Matraca Berg; Jim Collins	2:45
9.	"Rebel Child"	Wilson; Ashley Gorley; Wade Kirby	3:49
10.	"Raining on Me"	Wilson; Rich; McGehee	4:23
11.	"Not Bad for a Bartender"	Wilson; Rich; McGehee	3:49
12.	"Good Morning Heartache"	Ervin Drake; Dan Fishe; Irene Higginbotham	3:30
Total length:			41:56

Target Bonus Track
No.	Title	Writer(s)	Length
13.	"The Other Side of Me" (featuring Kid Rock)	Wilson; Rich; Blue Miller; Robert James Ritchie	3:34

- The Target bonus track "The Other Side of Me" appears before the ending track "Good Morning Heartache" which the track was not credited on the CD cover.

== Personnel ==
Compiled from liner notes.

- Gretchen Wilson – vocals
- Steve Nathan – pianos, Hammond B3 organ
- Tom Bukovac – electric guitar
- J. T. Corenflos – acoustic guitar, electric guitar
- Kenny Greenberg – electric guitar
- Dean Hall – electric guitar
- Bryan Sutton – acoustic guitar
- John Willis – acoustic guitar
- Blue Miller – guitars (13)
- Adam Shoenfeld – guitars (13)
- Paul Franklin – steel guitar, lap steel guitar
- Mike Johnson – steel guitar, lap steel guitar
- Russ Pahl – steel guitar, lap steel guitar
- Michael Rhodes – bass guitar
- Glenn Worf – bass guitar
- Matt Pierson – bass guitar (13)
- Chad Cromwell – drums, percussion
- Shannon Forrest – drums, percussion
- Eric Darken – drums, percussion
- Owen Hale – drums (13)
- Jonathan Yudkin – fiddle
- Wes Hightower – backing vocals
- Liana Manis – backing vocals
- Jon Nicholson – backing vocals
- Merle Haggard – vocals (7)
- Kid Rock – rap (13)

=== Production ===
- Clay Bradley – A&R direction
- John Rich – producer
- Gretchen Wilson – producer (1–12)
- Mark Wright – producer (1–12)
- Steve Marcantonio – recording (1–6, 8–13)
- Bart Pursley – recording (1–6, 8–13), overdub recording (1–6, 8–13), mixing
- John Guess – engineer (7)
- Freddie Sipowicz – engineer (7)
- Kid Rock – rap recording (13)
- Mike Clark – rap recording (13)
- Brian Graban – recording assistant (1–6, 8–13)
- Jimmy Bowen – additional overdub recording (7)
- Mike Post – additional overdub recording (7)
- Paul Hart – Pro Tools engineer, mix assistant
- Lowell Reynolds – mix assistant
- Andrew Mendelson – mastering at Georgetown Masters (Nashville, Tennessee)
- John Baldwin – mastering assistant
- Tonya Deery – A&R coordinator
- Joe Simpson – A&R coordinator
- Kay Smith – A&R coordinator
- Carie Higdon – project coordinator
- Tracy Baskette-Fleaner – art direction, design
- Deb Haus – art direction, artist development
- Kristin Barlowe – photography
- Candy Burton – hair, make-up
- Christiév Alphin – stylist
- Morris Management Group – management

== Chart performance ==
=== Weekly charts ===
Weekly chart performance for All Jacked Up
Chart (2005)	Peak position
Australian Albums (ARIA)	61
Canadian Albums (Billboard)	10
US Billboard 200	1
US Top Country Albums (Billboard)	1

=== Year-end charts ===
2005 year-end chart performance for All Jacked Up
Chart (2005)	Position
US Billboard 200	116
US Top Country Albums (Billboard)	19

2006 year-end chart performance for All Jacked Up
Chart (2006)	Position
US Billboard 200	121
US Top Country Albums (Billboard)	23

=== Singles ===
Chart performance for singles from All Jacked Up
Year	Single	Peak chart positions		Certifications (sales threshold)
Year	Single	US Country	US	Certifications (sales threshold)
2005	"All Jacked Up"	8	42	US: Gold
2005	"I Don't Feel Like Loving You Today"	22	109	
2006	"Politically Uncorrect" (featuring Merle Haggard)^{[A]}	23	—	
2006	"California Girls"	25	121	
"—" denotes releases that did not chart

== Certifications ==
Region	Certification
Canada (Music Canada)	Gold
United States (RIAA)	Platinum
