= Politically Uncorrect =

Single by Gretchen Wilson featuring Merle Haggard

from the album All Jacked Up
- Released: February 13, 2006
- Genre: Country
- Length: 3:23
- Label: Epic Nashville
- Songwriters: Leslie Satcher; Danny Steagall; Billy Henderson
- Producers: John Rich; Gretchen Wilson; Mark Wright

Gretchen Wilson singles chronology
"I Don't Feel Like Loving You Today" (2005)	"Politically Uncorrect" (2006)	"California Girls" (2006)

Merle Haggard singles chronology
"If You've Got the Money (I've Got the Time)" (2001)	"Politically Uncorrect" (2006)	"Working in Tennessee" (2011)

"Politically Uncorrect" is a song by American country music artist Gretchen Wilson featuring Merle Haggard. It was released on February 13, 2006, as the third single from Wilson's second studio album All Jacked Up. The song was written by Leslie Satcher, Danny Steagall, and Billy Henderson.

The song peaked at number 23 on the Hot Country Songs chart. "Politically Uncorrect" was nominated at the 48th Annual Grammy Awards in 2006 for the award of Best Country Collaboration with Vocals.

== Commercial performance ==
"Politically Uncorrect" debuted on the US Hot Country Songs initially as an album track, debuting on October 8, 2005, at number 58 due to unsolicited airplay. As a single, it re-entered the chart the week of February 18, 2006, at number 50. The song reached its peak position of number 23 the week of April 15, 2006, where it stayed for one week.

== Charts ==
=== Weekly charts ===
Chart (2006)	Peak position
Canada Country (Radio & Records)	31
US Hot Country Songs (Billboard)	23

=== Year-end charts ===
Chart (2006)	Position
US Country (Radio & Records)	88

== Release history ==
Release dates and format(s) for "Politically Uncorrect"
Region	Date	Format(s)	Label(s)	Ref.
United States	February 13, 2006	Country radio	Epic Nashville	
