= I Don't Feel Like Loving You Today =

Single by Gretchen Wilson

from the album All Jacked Up
- Released: October 17, 2005
- Genre: Country
- Length: 2:45
- Label: Epic
- Songwriters: Matraca Berg, Jim Collins
- Producers: John Rich, Gretchen Wilson, Mark Wright

Gretchen Wilson singles chronology
"All Jacked Up" (2005)	"I Don't Feel Like Loving You Today" (2005)	"Politically Uncorrect" (2006)

"I Don't Feel Like Loving You Today" is a song by American country music artist Gretchen Wilson. The song was released on October 17, 2005, as the second single from her second studio album All Jacked Up (2005). The song was written by Matraca Berg and Jim Collins, and produced by Wilson, John Rich, and Mark Wright.

Critical reception was mostly positive, with reviewers comparing the ballad production of the song to her 2004 single "When I Think About Cheatin'". The song peaked at number 22 on the Hot Country Songs chart.

== Chart performance ==
"I Don't Feel Like Loving You Today" debuted on the Billboard Hot Country Songs chart the week of October 22, 2005, at number 50. The song later reached a peak of number 22 on the chart, staying in that position for four non-consecutive weeks. It became her sixth consecutive top forty hit on the chart, although it was her first to miss the top ten.

== Charts ==
=== Weekly charts ===
Chart (2005–2006)	Peak position
Canada Country (Radio & Records)	24
US Bubbling Under Hot 100 (Billboard)	9
US Hot Country Songs (Billboard)	22

=== Year-end charts ===
Chart (2006)	Position
US Country (Radio & Records)	84

== Release history ==
Release dates and format(s) for "I Don't Feel Like Loving You Today"
Region	Date	Format(s)	Label(s)	Ref.
United States	October 17, 2005	Country radio	Epic Nashville	
