= Matt Kennon =

American singer-songwriter

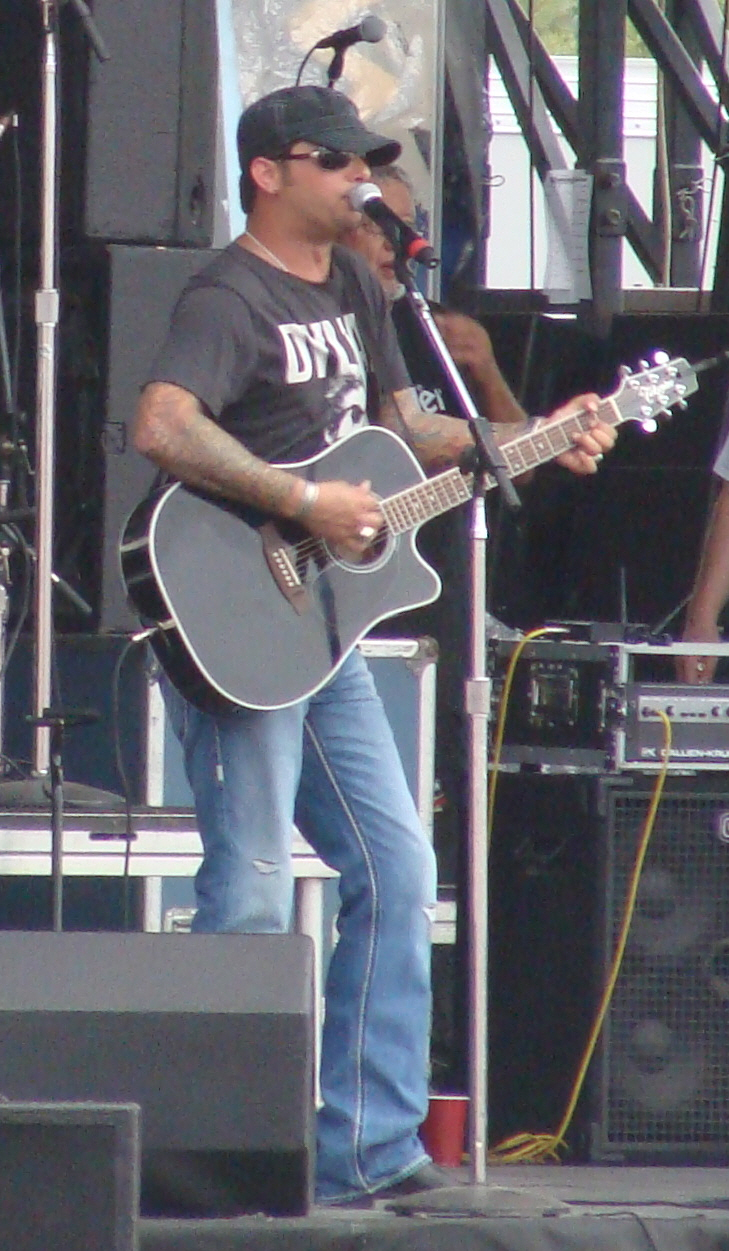
- Matt Kennon at BamaJam Music & Art Festival, in June 2010

Background information
- Born: Matthew Carl Ferguson
- Origin: Conyers, Georgia, U.S.
- Genres: Country
- Occupation: Singer-songwriter
- Instrument: Vocals
- Years active: 2001–present
- Label: BamaJam/Stroudavarious
- Website: http://mattkennon.com/

Matthew Carl Ferguson (born in Conyers, Georgia) is an American country music singer and songwriter known professionally as Matt Kennon. He has co-written a song for Randy Travis and has released one album for BamaJam Records. This album includes the top 40 hit "The Call".

== Biography ==
Matthew Carl Ferguson was born in Conyers, Georgia. He was adopted at birth by two parents who had previously lost three of their four biological children to a house fire. Kennon's birth mother, who already had another son, made a decision to have an abortion, but she arrived at her doctor's office two weeks too late and was told she had to carry the child to full term.

He began playing the drums at age seven, and went on to play drums in high school jazz bands. Later on, he began performing at clubs in the Atlanta, Georgia area, playing cover versions of country and southern rock songs.

In the late 2000s, Kennon self-released an album of his music, which he began selling at his concerts. He then moved to Nashville, Tennessee, where he met Travis Tritt's former manager Gary Falcon, who recommended him to Kyle Lehning, a record producer known for his work with Randy Travis. After Travis recorded Kennon's "Turn It Around" and released it as a single, Kennon was signed to a publishing contract. He also began working with another producer, James Stroud.

Later in 2009, Kennon signed to BamaJam Records in association with Stroudavarious Records (which Stroud owns) and released his debut single "The Call," which he wrote with Jeremy Campbell and Noah Gordon. The song debuted at number 55 on the Billboard Hot Country Songs charts dated for the week of October 17, 2009. Matt Bjorke of Roughstock gave the song a mostly-favorable review, saying that he did not enjoy the song upon first listen because of Kennon's voice, but said that the lyrics are "where it shines."

Kennon's self-titled debut album was released on May 11, 2010. In advance of the album's release, he released a three-song extended play featuring "The Call" and two other songs from the album.

In April 2011, Kennon self-released a second album titled 77.

In October 2012, Kennon self-released a third album titled Makin Music That Matters.

In August 2013, Kennon also released an extended play titled Four on the Floor, which included four new songs and a previously recorded track.

== Discography ==
=== Studio albums ===
Title	Album details	Peak chart positions			
Title	Album details	US Country	US	US Heat	US Indie
Matt Kennon	Release date: May 11, 2010; Label: BamaJam Records	19	116	1	24
77	Release date: April 27, 2011; Label: Roaddawg Records	—	—	—	—
Makin' Music That Matters	Release date: October 30, 2012; Label: Roaddawg Records	—	—	—	—
Leavin' Ain't Letting Go	Release date: July 15, 2016; Label: River Swirl Entertainment	—	—	—	—
When I Get Home	Release date: July 28, 2017; Label: Roaddawg Records	—	—	—	—
"—" denotes releases that did not chart

=== Compilation albums ===
Title	Album details
The Best Of	Release date: December 8, 2017; Label: Roaddawg Records

=== Extended plays ===
Title	Album details	Peak positions
Title	Album details	US Country
The Call	Release date: March 9, 2010; Label: BamaJam Records	65
EP3 – Single	Release date: August 6, 2011; Label: Roaddawg Records	—
Four on the Floor	Release date: August 13, 2013; Label: Roaddawg Records	—
Simplified	Release date: February 4, 2014; Label: Roaddawg Records	—
Real Good	Release date: September 16, 2014; Label: Roaddawg Records	—
"—" denotes releases that did not chart

=== Singles ===
Year	Single	Peak positions	Album
Year	Single	US Country	Album
2009	"The Call"	33	Matt Kennon
"—" denotes releases that did not chart

=== Music videos ===
Year	Video
2009	"The Call"
