= William Kennon Mayo =

- Born: 1824; Virginia
- Died: April 1900 (aged 75–76); Washington, D.C.
- Military career
- Allegiance: United States
- Branch: United States Navy
- Service years: 1841–1886
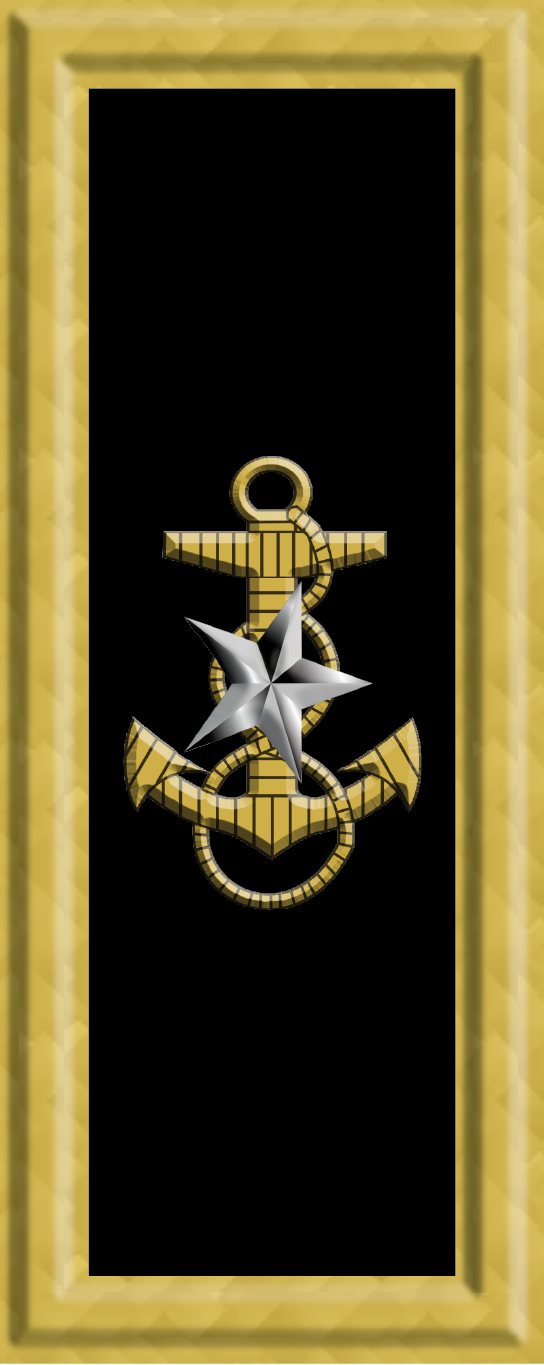
- Rank: Commodore
- Commands: USS Housatonic; USS Kanawha; USS Nahant
- Conflicts: Mexican–American War; American Civil War

William Kennon Mayo (1824–1900) was an officer in the United States Navy, most notably during the Mexican–American War and the American Civil War.

== Biography ==
Mayo, a native of Virginia, was appointed a midshipman in the U.S. Navy on October 18, 1841. He was first active in service during the Mexican–American War. Mayo was given charge of the boats of the landing party during the surrender of Monterrey. He also took part in the capture of Tampico and Vera Cruz.

After the war, Mayo was attached to a number of ships. His duties included surveying, other scientific work, and for a time, he was an instructor at the U.S. Naval Academy in Annapolis. In 1855, Mayo received his commission as lieutenant.

In January 1862, during the Civil War, he was appointed executive officer of the corvette Housatonic during the Union blockade of Charleston, South Carolina. In June 1862 Mayo was promoted to the rank of lieutenant commander.

Five months after his advancement in rank, Mayo was given command of the gunboat Kanawha. This vessel operated in the Western Gulf Squadron and was successful in capturing a number of small enemy vessels.

In February 1864, Mayo was stationed in Washington, D.C., on special duty. He returned to Charleston to participate in the blockade of that city's harbor the same July. As commander of the monitor Nahant, Mayo won the commendation of the Secretary of the Navy for assisting the effectiveness of the naval blockade.

After the capitulation of Charleston, Mayo became ordnance officer of the South Atlantic Blockading Squadron.

Mayo stayed in the Navy following the end of the Civil War, and was assigned to various ships and posts. In 1886, he was made a commander. Afterwards, Mayo spent nearly three years on navigation duty in Boston. Following this, he led a number of ships in station service.

Mayo was commandant of the Norfolk Naval Shipyard from 1882 to 1885. He was promoted to the rank of commodore on July 2, 1882.

He was retired upon his own application on May 18, 1886. Mayo died in Washington, D.C., in April 1900.
