= One of the Boys (Gretchen Wilson album) =

Studio album by Gretchen Wilson
- Released: May 15, 2007
- Studios: Blackbird (Nashville, Tennessee); Sony/Tree (Nashville, Tennessee); The Tracking Room (Nashville, Tennessee)
- Genre: Country
- Length: 37:20
- Label: Columbia Nashville
- Producers: John Rich; Gretchen Wilson; Mark Wright

Gretchen Wilson chronology
All Jacked Up (2005)	One of the Boys (2007)	Greatest Hits (2010)

Singles from One of the Boys
- 1. "Come to Bed" Released: October 30, 2006; 2. "One of the Boys" Released: May 14, 2007; 3. "You Don't Have to Go Home" Released: October 1, 2007

Professional ratings
Aggregate scores
Source	Rating
Metacritic	(68/100)
Review scores
Source	Rating
About.com	4/5 stars
Allmusic	4.5/5 stars
The Austin Chronicle	3/5 stars
Blender	3/5 stars
Entertainment Weekly	B+
Los Angeles Times	2.5/4 stars
Robert Christgau	(1-star Honorable Mention)
Rolling Stone	3/5 stars
Slant Magazine	2/5 stars
Uncut	3/5 stars

One of the Boys is the third studio album by American country music singer Gretchen Wilson. It was released on May 15, 2007 by Columbia Nashville after Wilson's previous label, Epic Nashville, was shut down. The album was produced by the team of Wilson, John Rich, and Mark Wright.

One of the Boys received positive reviews from music critics, with praise being towards Wilson's vocals and the production. The album debuted at number five on the Billboard 200 and her third consecutive number one on the Top Country Albums chart, selling 73,000 copies in its first week, far below the first week sales of her prior two studio albums, Here for the Party (2004) and All Jacked Up (2005). The album has sold 232,000 as of May 2008.

Three singles were released from the record. "Come to Bed", which was a duet with producer and singer John Rich of Big & Rich, peaked at number 32 on the Hot Country Songs chart, her lowest peaking lead single and overall single at the time. The title track "One of the Boys", which had the same writing team as her 2005 hit "Homewrecker", was another moderate hit, reaching number 35. The album's final single, "You Don't Have to Go Home", failed to make the top 40 at country radio.

== Track listing ==
No.	Title	Writer(s)	Length
1.	"The Girl I Am"	Gretchen Wilson; Dean Hall	3:30
2.	"Come to Bed" (duet with John Rich)	Vicky McGehee; John Rich	3:54
3.	"One of the Boys"	Wilson; Rivers Rutherford; George Teren	3:37
4.	"You Don't Have to Go Home"	Wilson; McGehee; Rich	3:19
5.	"Heaven Help Me"	Wilson; Rutherford; Teren	3:24
6.	"There's a Place in the Whiskey"	Del Gray; Shannon Lawson; Bobby L. Taylor	3:01
7.	"If You Want a Mother"	Wilson; Rutherford; Teren	3:34
8.	"Pain Killer"	Wilson; Hall	3:42
9.	"There Goes the Neighborhood"	Wilson; McGehee; Rich	2:57
10.	"Good Ole Boy"	Wilson; McGehee; Rich	2:53
11.	"To Tell You the Truth"	Wilson; Hall	3:31
Total length:			37:20

Circuit City Digital Bonus Track
No.	Title	Writer(s)	Length
12.	"Wasting Whiskey"	Wilson; Hall	3:49

- The bonus track "Wasting Whiskey" later became available on Amazon MP3 after Circuit City went out of business.

== Personnel ==
- Gretchen Wilson – lead vocals, backing vocals
- Steve Nathan – Hammond B3 organ, pianos
- Pat Buchanan – electric guitar
- Tom Bukovac – acoustic guitar, electric guitar
- J.T. Corenflos – electric guitar
- Mark Oakley – electric guitar
- John Willis – acoustic guitar, guitjo, mandolin
- Jonathan Yudkin – mandolin, cello, fiddle
- Mike Johnson – steel guitar
- Mark Hill – bass guitar
- Michael Rhodes – bass guitar
- Shannon Forrest – drums, percussion
- Eric Darken – percussion
- Dan Hochhalter – fiddle
- Brandon Fraley – backing vocals
- Wes Hightower – backing vocals
- John Rich – backing vocals (2)

=== Production ===
- Clay Bradley – A&R direction
- John Rich – producer
- Gretchen Wilson – producer
- Mark Wright – producer
- Rivers Rutherford – associate producer
- Bart Pursley – recording, mixing
- Adam Engelhardt – recording assistant
- Paul Hart – recording assistant
- Jason Lefan – recording assistant, mix assistant
- John Netti – recording assistant, mix assistant
- Lowell Reynolds – recording assistant
- Andrew Mendelson – mastering at Georgetown Masters (Nashville, Tennessee)
- Carie Higdon – production coordinator
- Judy Forde-Blair – creative production, album notes
- Tracy Baskette-Fleaner – art direction, design
- Kristin Barlowe – photography
- Candy Burton – hair, make-up
- Christiév Alphin – stylist
- Morris Management Group – management

== Chart performance ==
=== Weekly charts ===
Weekly chart performance for One of the Boys
Chart (2007)	Peak position
Australian Albums (ARIA)	91
US Billboard 200	5
US Top Country Albums (Billboard)	1

=== Year-end charts ===
2007 year-end chart performance for One of the Boys
Chart (2007)	Position
US Top Country Albums (Billboard)	54

=== Singles ===
Chart performance for singles from One of the Boys
Year	Single	Peak chart positions
Year	Single	US Country
2006	"Come to Bed" (featuring John Rich)	32
2007	"One of the Boys"	35
2007	"You Don't Have to Go Home"	53
