= All Jacked Up (song) =

Single by Gretchen Wilson

from the album All Jacked Up
- B-side: "When It Rains"
- Released: August 1, 2005
- Genre: Country
- Length: 3:31
- Label: Epic
- Songwriters: Vicky McGehee; John Rich; Gretchen Wilson
- Producers: John Rich; Gretchen Wilson; Mark Wright

Gretchen Wilson singles chronology
"Homewrecker" (2005)	"All Jacked Up" (2005)	"I Don't Feel Like Loving You Today" (2005)

"All Jacked Up" is a song co-written and recorded by American country music artist Gretchen Wilson. The song was released to country radio on August 1, 2005, by Epic Records Nashville as the lead single from Wilson's album of the same name. She wrote the song with John Rich and Vicky McGehee. Wilson, Rich and Mark Wright produced the song.

"All Jacked Up" debuted at number 21 on the US Hot Country Songs chart, breaking the record for the highest debut on the chart by a female artist. It peaked at number eight, becoming Wilson's final top ten hit to date. In Canada it reached number two on the country chart.

== Critical reception ==
Kevin John Coyne, reviewing the song for Country Universe, gave it a negative rating. He said that Wilson was trying too hard to recreate "Redneck Woman".

== Music video ==
The music video premiered on July 29, 2005, and was co-directed by Wilson with Deaton-Flanigen. The video features cameo appearances by Kid Rock, Hank Williams Jr., Charlie Daniels and Larry the Cable Guy, who appears as himself and as an angry transvestite.

== Chart performance ==
On the week of August 6, 2005, "All Jacked Up" debuted at number 21 on the Billboard Hot Country Songs chart. The song peaked at number 8, spending 20 weeks in total on the chart.

"All Jacked Up" debuted at number 97 on the Billboard Hot 100 the week of August 20, 2005. The song reached its peak position of number 42 and spent eleven weeks on the chart.

== Charts ==
Chart (2005)	Peak position
Canada Country (Radio & Records)	2
US Billboard Hot 100	42
US Hot Country Songs (Billboard)	8

=== Year-end charts ===
Chart (2005)	Position
US Country Songs (Billboard)	58
US Country Top 50 (Radio & Records)	62

== Track listing ==
CD single
No.	Title	Writer(s)	Producer(s)	Length
1.	"All Jacked Up"	Gretchen Wilson; John Rich; Vicky McGehee	Wilson; Rich; Mark Wright	3:29
2.	"When It Rains" (from Here for the Party)	Wilson; Rich; McGehee	Wright; Joe Scaife	3:02
