= Gretchen Wilson =

American country singer

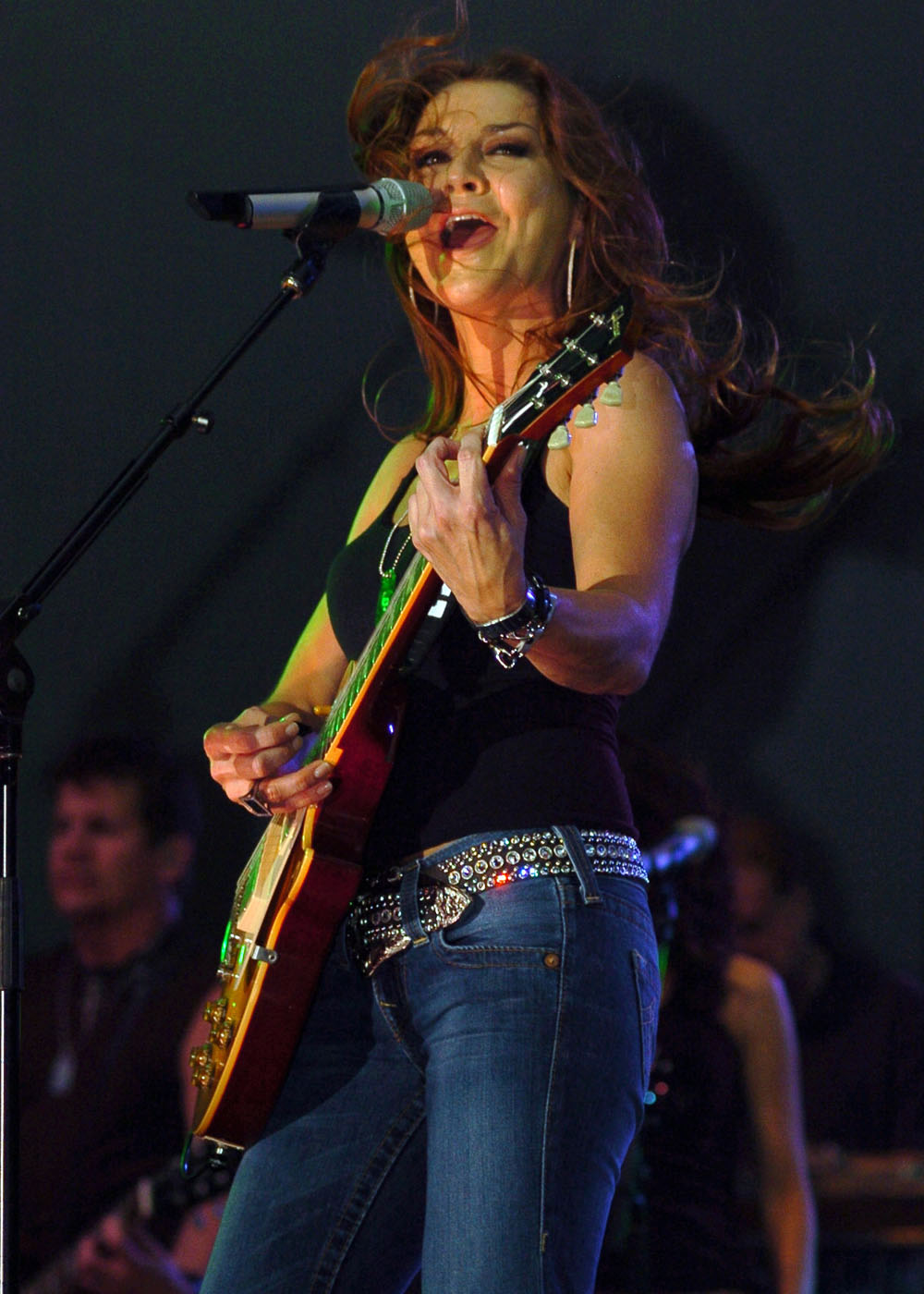
- Wilson in 2008

Background information
- Born: Gretchen Frances Wilson; June 26, 1973 (age 53); Pocahontas, Illinois, U.S.
- Origin: Nashville, Tennessee, U.S.
- Genres: Country; country rock
- Occupation: Singer-songwriter
- Instruments: Vocals; guitar
- Years active: 2003–present
- Labels: Epic Nashville; Columbia Nashville; Redneck
- Website: gretchenwilson.com

Gretchen Frances Wilson (born June 26, 1973) is an American country music singer and songwriter. She made her debut in March 2004 with the single "Redneck Woman", which peaked at number-one on the Billboard country charts. The song served as the lead-off single of her debut album Here for the Party. Wilson followed this album one year later with All Jacked Up, the title track of which became the highest-debuting single for a female country artist upon its 2005 release. Her third album, One of the Boys, was released in 2007.

Overall, Wilson has charted 13 singles on the Billboard country charts, of which five have reached top ten: the number one "Redneck Woman", as well as "Here for the Party" (#3, 2004), "When I Think About Cheatin'" (#4, 2004), "Homewrecker" (#2, 2005), and "All Jacked Up" (#8, 2005). The album Here for the Party was certified 5× multi-platinum by the RIAA for sales of five million copies, while All Jacked Up was certified platinum. She has sold over 8.2 million records worldwide.

== Early life ==
Wilson was born in Pocahontas, Illinois. Her mother was a teenager at the time. When she was two, her father left the family, with her mother becoming a single mother. She dropped out of high school and worked as a cook.

== Music career ==
=== Here for the Party ===
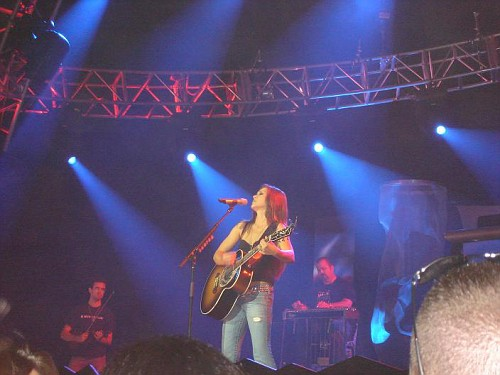
Wilson performing at the Hard Rock Hotel

Wilson signed with Epic Records in 2003 and recorded Here for the Party within the year. Her first single, "Redneck Woman", was released in early 2004 and reached the top of the Hot Country Songs charts and No. 22 on the Billboard Hot 100. This song was also the first number one country hit by a female in two years. The success of "Redneck Woman" prompted an earlier-than-planned release for Here for the Party, and it debuted at No. 1 on the Billboard country chart. It reached No. 2 on the Billboard 200 and Billboard Internet album sales charts. She performed as a support artist for Brooks & Dunn and Montgomery Gentry.

She released the title track to her debut album as the second single. It peaked at No. 3 on the Billboard country chart. Two other songs were released as singles, and both reached the top 10. Released in markets outside the U.S., the album hit No. 2 on the Australian country charts (behind Kasey Chambers) and the top 50 of the Australian charts. Here for the Party was certified 5× multi-platinum by the RIAA.

=== All Jacked Up ===
On September 27, 2005, Wilson released her second album, All Jacked Up, which peaked at No. 1 on both the Top 200 and Country album charts and sold 1 million copies. The title track debuted at No. 21 on the Hot Country Songs charts, setting a record for the highest debut ever made by a female artist.

This record was broken in late 2007 by Carrie Underwood's "So Small". Despite its high debut, however, "All Jacked Up" peaked at No. 8 on Hot Country Songs after only eight chart weeks. It was also used, at one time, by ESPN as the opening theme for its baseball coverage. Three more singles were released from All Jacked Up: "I Don't Feel Like Loving You Today", "Politically Uncorrect" (a duet with Merle Haggard) and "California Girls", none of which reached Top 20 on the country charts. These latter two singles were issued on Columbia Records, due to the closure of Epic Records's Nashville division.

Wilson's "I Don't Feel Like Loving You Today" was nominated for two Grammy Awards: Best Female Country Vocal Performance, and Best Country Song. In 2006, Wilson contributed a well-received cover of Kris Kristofferson's "Sunday Mornin' Coming Down" on the tribute CD The Pilgrim: A Celebration of Kris Kristofferson.

=== One of the Boys ===
On May 15, 2007, Wilson released her third album, One of the Boys. The album debuted at No. 5 on the Top 200 and at No. 1 on the Country album chart. After 10 weeks, it exited the Billboard Top 200, having sold 178,220 copies at that point. "Come to Bed" (a duet with John Rich) and the title track, the first two singles released, both peaked in the 30s on the country charts, while the third and final single ("You Don't Have to Go Home") failed to reach the Top 40.

=== I Got Your Country Right Here ===
On July 14, 2008, Wilson released a new single, "Don't Do Me No Good". This song was intended to be the lead-off single to a fourth studio album, but it failed to reach the Top 40 and the album was delayed. It was followed in 2009 by two more singles, "The Earrings Song" and "If I Could Do It All Again", neither of which entered the charts. Wilson then issued a press release on July 28, 2009, stating that she would be parting with Sony Music Nashville. Wilson then launched Redneck Records, her own record label. "Work Hard, Play Harder" was released to radio on October 26, 2009, as the first single from the label and her fourth studio album, I Got Your Country Right Here, was finally released on March 30, 2010. Her former label, Columbia Nashville, released her first Greatest Hits album on January 19, 2010, to finish off her recording contract.

On July 31, 2008, The Black Crowes filed a lawsuit against Wilson for copyright violation, alleging that her song "Work Hard, Play Harder" copied the Crowes song "Jealous Again". Also included in the suit were her label Sony BMG, her publishing company, and the cable network TNT, which had been using the song in commercials. The lawsuit was eventually settled out of court for an undisclosed sum and Black Crowes members Chris and Rich Robinson were given songwriting credits.

=== Right on Time, Under the Covers and Christmas in My Heart ===
Wilson released an album of original songs titled Right on Time on April 2, 2013. It was led by the single "Still Rollin'". A collection of rock covers titled Under the Covers was released on June 4, 2013. Wilson released her first Christmas album, Christmas in My Heart, on October 8, 2013.

== Other ventures ==
=== Rock music ===
Wilson has also attracted favorable attention for her rendition of classic rock songs by Heart – a group which she sees as "one of the biggest influences on my musical career".

She has appeared several times on the same stage as lead singer Ann Wilson and guitarist Nancy Wilson, once describing the experience as "beyond a dream come true".

She has sung "Straight On", "Crazy on You", and – most notably – "Barracuda", which she performed with Alice in Chains and Nancy Wilson on guitar at the 2007 VH1 Rock Honors. She also performed, with Randy Bachman, the classic Who track "Who Are You" on the album Who Are You – An All Star Tribute to the Who. She performed on Buckcherry's single "The Feeling Never Dies" (from the album Rock 'n' Roll), which was released on January 29, 2016.

She has sung "Even It Up", "Rock and Roll" and "Barracuda", which she performed with Heart, Jerry Cantrell, Dave Navarro, Duff McKagan, Rufus Wainwright and Carrie Underwood at the Decades Rock Live!.

=== Television ===
In 2025, Wilson competed in season thirteen of The Masked Singer as "Pearl" and won the season. She then did an encore of "Redneck Woman" while Nick Cannon, Robin Thicke, Jenny McCarthy, Ken Jeong, Rita Ora, and Andy Grammer (who finished in second place as "Boogie Woogie") danced in the background.

Wilson joined the cast of a new music competition show, The Road, which premiered on CBS in the fall of 2025. She will serve in the role of 'Tour Manager' alongside co-stars Keith Urban and Blake Shelton as they travel America looking for the "next big musician" who will open for Urban on tour.

=== Sports ===
In 2004, Wilson sang the national anthem before Game 4 of the World Series between the Boston Red Sox and the St. Louis Cardinals at Busch Memorial Stadium as a long-time fan of the Cardinals.

In April 2010, Wilson released a customized version of "Work Hard, Play Harder" in honor of the National Hockey League's Nashville Predators, with reworked lyrics mentioning the team and its fans.

She also sponsors a women's softball team in Pierron, Illinois.

== Political activism ==
Wilson sang the National Anthem (blended with a voice-over of the Pledge of Allegiance) to a national audience at the Republican National Convention on September 3, 2008, later describing this as a "once-in-a-lifetime" experience at a "historic moment." Wilson and her band also performed during a rally for Republican presidential candidate John McCain and vice-presidential candidate Sarah Palin at Lunken Airport in Cincinnati, Ohio, on October 22, 2008, to a crowd of approximately 12,000 supporters. Palin started the rally by exclaiming that she couldn't wait to get Wilson's autograph. Wilson played a version of the Heart song "Barracuda" for Palin.

In September 2024, she appeared at a Wisconsin rally for presidential candidate Donald Trump, where she sang "Redneck Woman" and then addressed the crowd from the podium. She said, "the American dream that I have been fortunate enough to find will more most certainly be lost forever if we do not show up and vote for freedom in November. It is on us. Let's make sure we, the people, do all we can to save our country by voting for President Trump and JD Vance."

== Personal life ==
Wilson shares a daughter with ex-boyfriend Mike Penner.

On August 21, 2018, Wilson was charged with breach of peace at Bradley International Airport in Windsor Locks, Connecticut.

Wilson has had various health issues, including a severe case of long COVID as well as a fractured leg.

== Awards ==
- 2005 CMA Female Vocalist of the Year
- 2004 ACM Top Female Vocalist
- 2004 ACM Top New Artist
- 2004 CMA Horizon Award

=== Grammy Awards history ===
| Year | Album or Song | Category | Result |
|---|---|---|---|
| 2005 | Herself | Best New Artist | Nominated |
| 2005 | "Redneck Woman" | Best Female Country Vocal Performance | Won |
| 2005 | "Redneck Woman" | Best Country Song | Nominated |
| 2005 | Here for the Party | Best Country Album | Nominated |
| 2006 | All Jacked Up | Best Country Album | Nominated |
| 2006 | "All Jacked Up" | Best Female Country Vocal Performance | Nominated |
| 2006 | "All Jacked Up" | Best Country Song | Nominated |
| 2006 | "Politically Uncorrect" (with Merle Haggard) | Best Country Collaboration with Vocals | Nominated |
| 2007 | "I Don't Feel Like Loving You Today" | Best Female Country Vocal Performance | Nominated |
| 2008 | "These Days" (as featured artist) | Album of the Year | Nominated |
| 2011 | "I'd Love To Be Your Last" | Best Female Country Vocal Performance | Nominated |

== Discography ==
Studio albums

- Here for the Party (2004)
- All Jacked Up (2005)
- One of the Boys (2007)
- I Got Your Country Right Here (2010)
- Right on Time (2013)
- Under the Covers (2013)
- Ready to Get Rowdy (2017)
