= Deana Carter discography =

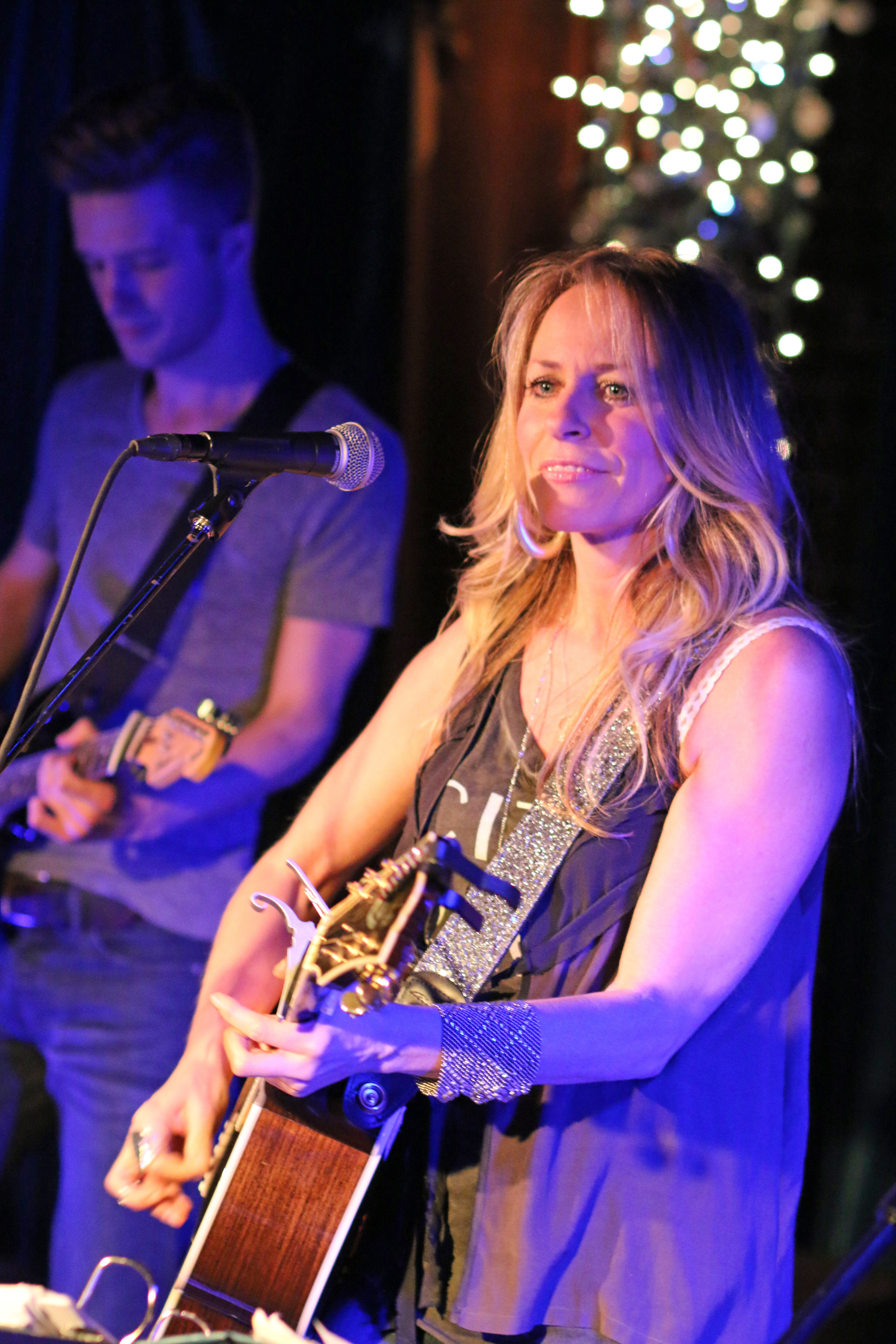
- Studio albums: 7
- Compilation albums: 2
- Singles: 21
- Music videos: 14
- No. 1 Singles: 3

The discography of Deana Carter, an American country music singer, consists of seven studio albums and 21 singles. She debuted in 1995 with two test singles released in the United Kingdom before entering the Hot Country Songs charts in 1996 with "Strawberry Wine", the first of three number-one singles from her album Did I Shave My Legs for This? Her second and third albums, Everything's Gonna Be Alright and I'm Just a Girl, also produced top 40 hits at country radio.

== Studio albums ==
=== 1990s ===
Title	Album details	Peak chart positions					Certifications (sales thresholds)
Title	Album details	US Country	US	US Heat	CAN Country	CAN	Certifications (sales thresholds)
Did I Shave My Legs for This?	Release date: February 27, 1995; Label: Capitol Nashville; Formats: CD, cassette	2	10	4	1	25	CAN: 4× Platinum; US: 5× Platinum
Everything's Gonna Be Alright	Release date: October 20, 1998; Label: Capitol Nashville; Formats: CD, cassette	6	57	—	11	—	CAN: Gold; US: Gold
"—" denotes releases that did not chart

=== 2000s–2010s ===
Title	Album details	Peak chart positions		
Title	Album details	US Country	US	US Indie
Father Christmas	Release date: November 20, 2001; Label: Deanatone / Rounder; Formats: CD, cassette	—	—	—
I'm Just a Girl	Release date: March 18, 2003; Label: Arista Nashville; Formats: CD	6	58	—
The Story of My Life	Release date: March 8, 2005; Label: Vanguard; Formats: CD, music download	26	150	9
The Chain	Release date: October 9, 2007; Label: Vanguard; Formats: CD, music download	60	—	—
Southern Way of Life	Release date: December 2, 2013; Label: Little Nugget; Formats: CD, music download	—	—	—
"—" denotes releases that did not chart

== Compilation albums ==
Title	Album details	Peak chart positions
Title	Album details	US Country
The Deana Carter Collection	Release date: August 13, 2002; Label: Capitol Nashville; Formats: CD	54
Icon	Release date: May 14, 2013; Label: Capitol Nashville; Formats: CD, digital download	—
"—" denotes releases that did not chart

== Live albums ==
Title	Album details
Live in Concert	Release date: February 20, 2007; Label: Big Band Concert Series; Formats: CD, digital download

== Extended plays ==
Title	Album details
Songs from the Heart	Release date: 2001; Label: Kal Kan Foods; Formats: CD

== Singles ==
=== 1990s ===
Year	Single	Peak chart positions				Certifications (sales thresholds)	Album
Year	Single	US Country	US	CAN Country	UK	Certifications (sales thresholds)	Album
1995	"Angel Without a Prayer"	—	—	—	100		Did I Shave My Legs for This?
1995	"Are You Coming Home Today?"	—	—	—	93		Did I Shave My Legs for This?
1996	"Strawberry Wine"	1	65	1	—	RIAA: 2× Platinum	Did I Shave My Legs for This?
1996	"We Danced Anyway"	1	72	1	—		Did I Shave My Legs for This?
1997	"Count Me In"	5	—	7	—		Did I Shave My Legs for This?
1997	"How Do I Get There"	1	—	2	—		Did I Shave My Legs for This?
1997	"Did I Shave My Legs for This?"	25	85	36	—		Did I Shave My Legs for This?
1998	"Absence of the Heart"	16	83	7	—		Everything's Gonna Be Alright
1999	"You Still Shake Me"	36	—	19	—		Everything's Gonna Be Alright
1999	"Angels Working Overtime"	35	—	55	—		Everything's Gonna Be Alright
1999	"Ruby Brown"	—	—	74	—		Everything's Gonna Be Alright
"—" denotes releases that did not chart or were not released in that country

=== 2000s and 2010s ===
Year	Single	Peak chart positions		Album
Year	Single	US Country	US Bubbling	Album
2002	"There's No Limit"	14	2	I'm Just a Girl
2003	"I'm Just a Girl"	35	—	I'm Just a Girl
2005	"(Bleep) Texas"	—	—	Non-album single
2005	"One Day at a Time"	55	—	The Story of My Life
2005	"The Girl You Left Me For"	—	—	The Story of My Life
2005	"Sunny Day"	—	—	The Story of My Life
2006	"In a Heartbeat"	—	—	The Story of My Life
2007	"On the Road Again" (with Willie Nelson)	—	—	The Chain
2013	"Do or Die"	—	—	Southern Way of Life
2014	"That's Just Me"	—	—	Southern Way of Life
"—" denotes releases that did not chart

== Other appearances ==
These recordings were only commercially released through compilations or other artists.

Year	Song	Album
1997	"Ruby Tuesday"	Stone Country: Country Artists Perform the Songs of the Rolling Stones
1997	"Once Upon a December"	Anastasia
1998	"What Makes You Stay"	Hope Floats: Music from the Motion Picture
1998	"Missing You (My Bill)"	Civil War: The Nashville Sessions
1998	"Colour Everywhere"	Touched by an Angel: The Album
1998	"Carol of the Bells"	Sounds of the Season '98
1999	"Free Fallin'"	King of the Hill
2000	"State Trooper"	Badlands: A Tribute to Bruce Springsteen's Nebraska
2001	"The Cuckoo Bird"	Songcatcher
2002	"Mamas Don't Let Your Babies Grow Up to Be Cowboys" (with Sara Evans)	I've Always Been Crazy: A Tribute to Waylon Jennings
2002	"Emmanuel"	A Peaceful Christmas
2005	"Boogie Woogie Santa"	Christmas Angels
2006	"Go Rest High on That Mountain" (with Heart)	Cracker Barrel Presents Songs of the Year
2008	"Dream On"	Gone Country '70s Rock

== Music videos ==
Most of Carter's singles have featured music videos. An album-cut, "I've Loved Enough to Know", featured a video. Deana Carter also released a video for her rendition of "Once Upon a December".

Year	Video	Director
1995	"Angel Without a Prayer"	Roger Pistole
1996	"I've Loved Enough to Know"	
1996	"Strawberry Wine"	Roger Pistole
1997	"We Danced Anyway"	Roger Pistole
1997	"Count Me In"	Michael McNamara
1997	"Once Upon a December"	Roger Pistole
1998	"Did I Shave My Legs for This?"	Roger Pistole
1998	"Absence of the Heart"	Roger Pistole
1999	"You Still Shake Me"	Michael Valletta, Jim Lockhart
1999	"Angels Working Overtime"	Luke Scott
2002	"There's No Limit"	Randee St. Nicholas
2005	"One Day at a Time"	Chris Hicky
2006	"In a Heartbeat"	Chris Hicky
2013	"Do or Die"	Deana Carter
2013	"That's Just Me"	Deana Carter
