= The Deana Carter Collection =

Compilation album by Deana Carter
- Released: August 13, 2002
- Genre: Country
- Length: 46:30
- Label: Capitol Nashville
- Producer: Deana Carter

Deana Carter chronology
Father Christmas (2001)	The Deana Carter Collection (2002)	I'm Just a Girl (2003)

Professional ratings
Review scores
Source	Rating
Allmusic	2/5 stars

The Deana Carter Collection is the first compilation album by the American country music singer of the same name. Seven of the album's tracks were previous hit singles from her first two albums, Did I Shave My Legs for This? and Everything's Gonna Be Alright. The other tracks on the album consist of album cuts from those same albums that weren't released to radio. The Deana Carter Collection peaked at #54 on the US Top Country album chart. Capitol released this album after Carter had already departed from the label and resulted in no newly recorded tracks; although three tracks ("Rita Valentine", "Graffiti Bridge", and "Angel Without a Prayer") were previously available only in the UK version of her debut album and not in the U.S. version.

== Track listing ==
No.	Title	Writer(s)	Length
1.	"Strawberry Wine"	Matraca Berg, Gary Harrison	4:50
2.	"We Danced Anyway"	Berg, Randy Scruggs	3:22
3.	"Did I Shave My Legs for This?"	Carter, Rhonda Hart	3:13
4.	"Count Me In"	Carter, Chuck Jones	3:25
5.	"You Still Shake Me"	Tim Ryan Rouillier, Leslie Satcher	2:49
6.	"Absence of the Heart"	Carter, Chris Farren, Jones	3:30
7.	"How Do I Get There"	Carter, Farren	4:10
8.	"People Miss Planes"	Liz Hengber, Deanna Bryant	3:26
9.	"I've Loved Enough to Know"	Carter, Jones	3:23
10.	"Rita Valentine"	Carter	3:25
11.	"Graffiti Bridge"	Carter, Bob DiPiero	3:39
12.	"Angel Without a Prayer"	Carter, Michael Dan Ehmig, Michael Smotherman	5:18

== Chart performance ==
Chart (2002)	Peak position
U.S. Billboard Top Country Albums	54
