= Homewrecker (Gretchen Wilson song) =

Single by Gretchen Wilson

from the album Here for the Party
- Released: February 22, 2005
- Genre: Country pop; country rock
- Length: 3:26
- Label: Epic Nashville
- Songwriters: George Teren; Rivers Rutherford; Gretchen Wilson
- Producers: Joe Scaife; Mark Wright

Gretchen Wilson singles chronology
"When I Think About Cheatin'" (2004)	"Homewrecker" (2005)	"All Jacked Up" (2005)

"Homewrecker" is a song by American country music artist Gretchen Wilson, released on February 22, 2005, as the fourth and final single from her debut studio album Here for the Party (2004). It was written by Wilson, George Teren, and Rivers Rutherford, with the song also being produced by Joe Scaife and Mark Wright. It peaked at number two on the US Hot Country Songs chart.

== Content ==
In "Homewrecker," the female narrator addresses another female who wants to commit adultery with the narrator's lover. The narrator refers to this other woman as a "homewrecker," and threatens to "go to kickin' [her] pretty little butt.".

== Critical reception ==
Johnny Loftus of Allmusic said that Wilson "happily belts out the harder edges" of the song, contrasting it with Wilson's vocal performance on the ballad "When I Think About Cheatin'." In Rolling Stone, Jon Caramanica also contrasted "Homewrecker" with other songs on the album, saying that its role of "moral arbiter" was "just as impassioned" as the other "country persona[s]" on the album. Stylus Magazine critic Josh Love compared the song's sound to that of the Dixie Chicks and said that it was "less about cloistered worship than a real-world application of the life-affirming principles first put forth by" the Dixie Chicks and Shania Twain. Kevin John Coyne, reviewing the song for Country Universe, gave it a negative rating. He stated that the song sounds like more of "a rip-off of than a homage to Loretta Lynn."

== Commercial performance ==
"Homewrecker" debuted on the US Billboard Hot Country Songs charts dated for the week ending January 29, 2005. The song reached a peak of number two and held that position for three weeks, spending a total of twenty weeks on the charts. It was Wilson's fourth consecutive chart hit, making her the first female artist to send her first four singles into the country top ten since Deana Carter did so with "Strawberry Wine", "We Danced Anyway", "Count Me In", and "How Do I Get There" between 1996 and 1997.

== Charts ==
=== Weekly charts ===
Chart (2005)	Peak position
Canada Country (Radio & Records)	2
US Billboard Hot 100	56
US Hot Country Songs (Billboard)	2

=== Year-end charts ===
Chart (2005)	Position
US Country Songs (Billboard)	33

== Release history ==
Release dates and format(s) for "Homewrecker"
Region	Date	Format(s)	Label(s)	Ref.
United States	February 22, 2005	Country radio	Epic Nashville	
