= RPM Year-End =

Canadian music charts

RPM Year-End charts are a cumulative measure of a single or album's performance in Canada, based upon the RPM magazine charts during any given chart year. Throughout the magazine's existence, RPM published year-end charts for the best-selling singles and albums in Canada, and also published specialty year-end charts for Canadian content (singles and albums), country music (singles and albums), easy listening/MOR/adult contemporary (singles only), disco/dance music (singles only), alternative rock (singles/tracks only) and urban contemporary (singles/tracks only)

== Number-one singles ==
Year	Pop		Country		Easy listening/MOR/adult contemporary	Dance	Alternative rock
Year	Song	Album	Song	Album	Easy listening/MOR/adult contemporary	Dance	Alternative rock
1967	"The Letter"; The Box Tops	—	—	—	—	—	—
1968	"Hey Jude"; The Beatles	—	—	—	—	—	—
1969	"Get Back"; The Beatles	—	—	—	—	—	—
1970	"Bridge over Troubled Water"; Simon & Garfunkel	—	—	—	—	—	—
1971	"Joy to the World"; Three Dog Night	—	—	—	—	—	—
1972	"American Pie (song)" Don McLean	—	—	—	—	—	—
1973	"Tie a Yellow Ribbon Round the Ole Oak Tree"; Dawn	—	—	—	—	—	—
1974	"Seasons in the Sun"; Terry Jacks	Band on the Run; Paul McCartney and Wings	—	—	—	—	—
1975	"Love Will Keep Us Together"; Captain & Tennille	Captain Fantastic and the Brown Dirt Cowboy; Elton John	"Thank God I'm a Country Boy"; John Denver	—	"I'm Sorry"; John Denver	—	—
1976	"Tonight's the Night (Gonna Be Alright)"; Rod Stewart	Frampton Comes Alive! Peter Frampton	—	—	—	—	—
1977	"You Light Up My Life"; Debby Boone	Rumours; Fleetwood Mac	"Luckenbach, Texas (Back to the Basics of Love)"; Waylon Jennings	—	—	—	—
1978	"Night Fever"; Bee Gees	Saturday Night Fever; Soundtrack	"Portrait in the Window"; Carroll Baker	—	—	—	—
1979	"The Logical Song"; Supertramp	Breakfast in America; Supertramp	"You're the Only One"; Dolly Parton	—	—	—	—
1980	"Another Brick in the Wall (Part II)"; Pink Floyd	The Wall; Pink Floyd	"Hollywood Love"; Carroll Baker	—	—	—	—
1981	"Stars on 45 Medley"; Stars on 45	Face Value; Phil Collins	"Crying"; Don McLean	—	—	—	—
1982	"I Love Rock 'n' Roll"; Joan Jett & the Blackhearts	Business as Usual; Men at Work	"Love Will Turn You Around"; Kenny Rogers	—	—	—	—
1983	"Every Breath You Take"; The Police	Thriller; Michael Jackson	"The Closer You Get"; Alabama	—	—	—	—
1984	"I Just Called to Say I Love You"; Stevie Wonder	Born in the U.S.A. Bruce Springsteen	"The Lady Takes the Cowboy Everytime"; Larry Gatlin	—	—	—	—
1985	"Never Surrender"; Corey Hart	No Jacket Required; Phil Collins	"I Don't Know Why You Don't Want Me"; Rosanne Cash	—	—	—	—
1986	"The Power of Love"; Jennifer Rush	Whitney Houston; Whitney Houston	"Rockin' with the Rhythm of the Rain"; The Judds	—	—	—	—
1987	"La Bamba"; Los Lobos	The Joshua Tree; U2	"No Place Like Home"; Randy Travis	—	—	—	—
1988	"Get Outta My Dreams, Get Into My Car"; Billy Ocean	Kick; INXS	"Streets of Bakersfield; Dwight Yoakam and Buck Owens	—	—	—	—
1989	"Like a Prayer"; Madonna	The Raw and the Cooked; Fine Young Cannibals	"Full Moon Full of Love" k.d. lang	—	—	—	—
1990	"I Wish It Would Rain Down"; Phil Collins	I Do Not Want What I Haven't Got; Sinéad O'Connor	"Hard Rock Bottom of Your Heart"; Randy Travis	—	"Nothing Compares 2 U"; Sinéad O'Connor	—	—
1991	"(Everything I Do) I Do It for You"; Bryan Adams	Out of Time; R.E.M.	"The Thunder Rolls"; Garth Brooks	—	"(Everything I Do) I Do It for You"; Bryan Adams	—	—
1992	"Sometimes Love Just Ain't Enough"; Patty Smyth with Don Henley	Classic Queen; Queen	"Achy Breaky Heart"; Billy Ray Cyrus	—	"Beauty and the Beast"; Celine Dion and Peabo Bryson	—	—
1993	"I Will Always Love You"; Whitney Houston	Unplugged; Eric Clapton	"In the Heart of a Woman"; Billy Ray Cyrus	Some Gave All; Billy Ray Cyrus	"I Don't Wanna Fight"; Tina Turner	—	—
1994	"All for Love"; Bryan Adams, Rod Stewart and Sting	The Sign; Ace of Base	"Nobody Gets Too Much Love"; Charlie Major	Kickin' It Up; John Michael Montgomery	"Now and Forever"; Richard Marx	—	—
1995	"I'll Be There for You"; The Rembrandts	Cracked Rear View; Hootie & the Blowfish	"The Woman in Me (Needs the Man in You)"; Shania Twain	The Hits; Garth Brooks	"Have You Ever Really Loved a Woman"; Bryan Adams	"Scatman"; Scatman John	"Bullet with Butterfly Wings"; The Smashing Pumpkins
1996	"You Learn"; Alanis Morissette	Jagged Little Pill; Alanis Morissette	"Every Time I Get Around You"; David Lee Murphy	The Woman in Me; Shania Twain	"Because You Loved Me"; Celine Dion	"Children"; Robert Miles	"Burden in My Hand"; Soundgarden
1997	"Building a Mystery"; Sarah McLachlan	—	"We Danced Anyway"; Deana Carter	Did I Shave My Legs for This? Deana Carter	"Alone"; Bee Gees	"Wannabe"; The Spice Girls	"Walkin' on the Sun"; Smash Mouth
1998	"Torn"; Natalie Imbruglia	Titanic; Soundtrack	"Honey, I'm Home"; Shania Twain	Come On Over; Shania Twain	"My Heart Will Go On"; Celine Dion	"If You Could Read My Mind"; Stars on 54	"Poets"; The Tragically Hip
1999	"Livin' la Vida Loca"; Ricky Martin	Millennium; Backstreet Boys	"Amazed"; Lonestar	Come On Over; Shania Twain			

== See also ==
- Billboard Year-End
