= 32nd Academy of Country Music Awards =

US music awards ceremony in 1997

- Date: April 23, 1997
- Location: Universal Amphitheatre, Los Angeles, California
- Hosted by: Crystal Bernard; George Strait; Jeff Foxworthy

Highlights
- Most wins: LeAnn Rimes (3)
- Most nominations: Brooks & Dunn (6)

Television/radio coverage
- Network: NBC

The 32nd Academy of Country Music Awards was held on April 23, 1997, at the Universal Amphitheatre, in Los Angeles, California . The ceremony was hosted by George Strait, Jeff Foxworthy, and Crystal Bernard.

== Winners and nominees ==
Winners are shown in bold.

Entertainer of the Year	Album of the Year
**Brooks & Dunn**; Garth Brooks; Alan Jackson; Tim McGraw; George Strait	**Blue Clear Sky — George Strait**; Blue — LeAnn Rimes; Borderline — Brooks & Dunn; Time Marches On — Tracy Lawrence; The Trouble with the Truth — Patty Loveless
Top Female Vocalist of the Year	Top Male Vocalist of the Year
**Patty Loveless**; Reba McEntire; LeAnn Rimes; Shania Twain; Trisha Yearwood	**George Strait**; Vince Gill; Alan Jackson; Collin Raye; Bryan White
Top Vocal Group of the Year	Top Vocal Duo of the Year
**Sawyer Brown**; BlackHawk; Lonestar; The Mavericks; Ricochet	**Brooks & Dunn**; Jeff Foxworthy and Alan Jackson; Lorrie Morgan and Jon Randall; Marty Stuart and Travis Tritt; Hank Williams Jr. and Hank Williams III
Single Record of the Year	Song of the Year
**"Blue"** — **LeAnn Rimes**; "Carried Away" — George Strait; "My Maria" — Brooks & Dunn; "Strawberry Wine" — Deana Carter; "Time Marches On" — Tracy Lawrence	**"Blue"** — **Bill Mack**; "Carried Away" — Jeff Stevens, Steve Bogard; "My Maria" — B.W. Stevenson, Daniel Moore; "Strawberry Wine" — Matraca Berg, Gary Harrison; "Time Marches On" — Bobby Braddock
Top New Male Vocalist	Top New Female Vocalist
**Trace Adkins**; James Bonamy; Kevin Sharp	**LeAnn Rimes**; Deana Carter; Mindy McCready
Top New Vocal Duo or Group	Video of the Year
**Ricochet**; BR5-49; Burnin' Daylight	**"I Think About You"** — **Collin Raye**; "The Change" — Garth Brooks; "More Than You'll Ever Know" — Travis Tritt; "My Maria" — Brooks & Dunn; "She Never Looks Back" — Doug Supernaw
Pioneer Award
**Roy Clark**

== Performers ==
Performer(s)	Song(s)
Garth Brooks; Chris LeDoux; Charlie Daniels	"The Fever"
Vince Gill	"Pretty Little Adriana"
Burnin' Daylight; Ricochet	Top New Vocal Duo or Group Medley "Say Yes" "Daddy's Money"
LeAnn Rimes	"The Light in Your Eyes"
Tracy Lawrence	"How a Cowgirl Says Goodbye"
Patty Loveless	"The Trouble with the Truth"
Tim McGraw; Faith Hill	"It's Your Love"
Brooks & Dunn	Hits Medley "We'll Burn That Bridge" "Mama Don't Get Dressed Up for Nothing" "Little Miss Honky Tonk"
Deana Carter; Mindy McCready; LeAnn Rimes	Top New Female Vocalist Medley "We Danced Anyway" "A Girl's Gotta Do (What a Girl's Gotta Do)" "Blue"
George Strait	"One Night at a Time"
Alan Jackson	"Who's Cheatin' Who"
Bill Engvall	Comedy Performance: "Here's Your Sign"
Reba McEntire	"I'd Rather Ride Around with You"
Clint Black	Hits Medley "Put Yourself in My Shoes" "A Better Man" "A Good Run of Bad Luck" "Like the Rain"
James Bonamy; Kevin Sharp; Trace Adkins	Top New Male Vocalist Medley "I Don't Think I Will" "Nobody Knows" "(This Ain't) No Thinkin' Thing"
The Mavericks; Trisha Yearwood	"Something Stupid"
Bryan White	"That's Another Song"
Deana Carter	"Strawberry Wine"
Billy Dean; Crystal Bernard	"Have We Forgotten What Love Is"

== Presenters ==
Presenter(s)	Notes
Collin Raye; Lisa Hartman Black; Marty Stuart	Top Vocal Group of the Year
Neal McCoy; Martina McBride; Doug Stone	Top New Vocal Duo or Group
Joe Diffie; Chely Wright; Clay Walker	Single Record of the Year
John Berry; Olivia Newton-John; Randy Travis	Top Female Vocalist of the Year
Toby Keith; Trisha Yearwood; Ty Herndon	Top Vocal Duo of the Year
Kathy Mattea; Riders in the Sky	Video of the Year
Gary Chapman; Sawyer Brown	Top New Female Vocalist
BlackHawk; Pam Tillis	Song of the Year
Oak Ridge Boys	Presented Cliffie Stone Pioneer Award to Roy Clark
Cliffie Stone; Patti Page	Top New Male Vocalist
Kenny Chesney; Tanya Tucker; Stone Phillips	Album of the Year
Troy Aikman; Naomi Judd; Ashley Judd	Top Male Vocalist of the Year
Jay Leno	Entertainer of the Year
