= 1997 Country Music Association Awards =

Annual US music awards ceremony

- Date: September 24, 1997
- Location: Grand Ole Opry House, Nashville, Tennessee
- Hosted by: Vince Gill
- Most wins: George Strait (2)
- Most nominations: George Strait (6)

Television/radio coverage
- Network: CBS

The 1997 Country Music Association Awards, 31st Ceremony, was held on September 24, 1997 at the Grand Ole Opry House, Nashville, Tennessee, and was hosted by CMA Award Winner, Vince Gill.

== Winners and Nominees ==
Winner are in Bold.

Entertainer of the Year	Album of the Year
**Garth Brooks**; Brooks & Dunn; Vince Gill; Alan Jackson; George Strait	**Carrying Your Love With Me — George Strait**; Blue — LeAnn Rimes; Did I Shave My Legs For This? — Deana Carter; Everybody Knows — Trisha Yearwood; Everything I Love — Alan Jackson
Male Vocalist of the Year	Female Vocalist of the Year
**George Strait**; Vince Gill; Alan Jackson; Collin Raye; Bryan White	**Trisha Yearwood**; Deana Carter; Patty Loveless; LeAnn Rimes; Pam Tillis
Vocal Group of the Year	Vocal Duo of the Year
**Diamond Rio**; Alabama; The Mavericks; Ricochet; Sawyer Brown	**Brooks & Dunn**; Bellamy Brothers; Raybon Brothers; Thrasher & Shiver; John & Audrey Wiggins
Single of the Year	Song of the Year
**"Strawberry Wine" — Deana Carter**; "All The Good Ones Are Gone" — Pam Tillis; "Carried Away" — George Strait; "It's Your Love" — Tim McGraw and Faith Hill; "One Night At A Time" — George Strait	**"Strawberry Wine" — Matraca Berg and Gary Harrison**; All The Good Ones Are Gone — Bob McDill and Dean Dillon; Blue — Bill Mack; Butterfly Kisses — Bob Carlisle and Randy Thomas; Time Marches On — Bobby Braddock
Horizon Award	Musician of the Year
**LeAnn Rimes**; Trace Adkins; Deana Carter; Terri Clark; Lee Ann Womack	**Brent Mason**; Eddie Bayers; Paul Franklin; Matt Rollings; Brent Rowan
Music Video of the Year	Vocal Event of the Year
**455 Rocket — Kathy Mattea**; All The Good Ones Are Gone — Pam Tillis; Every Light In The House — Trace Adkins; It's Your Love — Tim McGraw and Faith Hill; Strawberry Wine — Deana Carter	**"It's Your Love"** — Tim McGraw and Faith Hill; "John the Revelator: Peace in the Valley" — Lee Roy Parnell and The Fairfield Four; "Long Haired Country Boy" — Charlie Daniels, John Berry, and Hal Ketchum; "Still Holding On" — Clint Black and Martina McBride; "You've Got a Friend in Me" — Kathy Mattea and George Jones

== Hall of Fame ==
Country Music Hall Of Fame Inductees
- Harlan Howard
- Brenda Lee
- Cindy Walker
