= How Do I Get There =

Single by Deana Carter

from the album Did I Shave My Legs for This?
- B-side: "Did I Shave My Legs for This?"
- Released: July 21, 1997
- Studio: Emerald Sound (Nashville, TN)
- Genre: Country
- Length: 4:09 (album version); 3:29 (radio edit)
- Label: Capitol Nashville
- Songwriters: Deana Carter; Chris Farren
- Producer: Chris Farren

Deana Carter singles chronology
"Count Me In" (1997)	"How Do I Get There" (1997)	"Did I Shave My Legs for This?" (1997)

"How Do I Get There" is a song by American country music artist Deana Carter, written by her and Chris Farren who also produced the track. It was recorded for her debut studio album Did I Shave My Legs for This? (1995) by Capitol Nashville. "How Do I Get There" was serviced to country radio stations on July 21, 1997, as the fourth single (sixth overall) from the US version of the album. No video was made for the song.

The track became another success for Carter, reaching the top spot of the US Hot Country Songs chart, becoming her third and final number one single alongside being her final song to reach the top ten to date.

== Critical reception ==
Deborah Evans Price of Billboard magazine gave a positive review, saying: "Carter puts that sweet Southern voice of hers to excellent use on this fiddle-laced up-tempo number. After one listen, it is easy to understand why Carter is one of this year's big success stories. Her vocal delivery radiates a charm and self-assurance that draws the listener into the song. This should be the latest in her growing string of hits."

== Commercial performance ==
"How Do I Get There" debuted at number 52 on the US Billboard Hot Country Songs chart on August 2, 1997, where it became the "Hot Shot Debut" of the week. It rose to the top ten the week of September 20, 1997, becoming her fourth and ultimately final top ten single; Carter's highest charting song since has been "There's No Limit", which reached number 14 in 2003. It reached a peak position of number one on the chart the week of October 18, 1997, displacing Diamond Rio's "How Your Love Makes Me Feel". It spent one week in the position before being displaced by "Everywhere" from Tim McGraw. The song spent 20 weeks in total. Carter would be the last female artist to send her first four singles to the top ten of the country chart until Gretchen Wilson did so between 2004 and 2005 with "Redneck Woman", "Here for the Party", "When I Think About Cheatin'", and "Homewrecker".

== Track listing ==
Jukebox 7"
No.	Title	Length
1.	"How Do I Get There"	4:09
2.	"Did I Shave My Legs for This?"	3:11

Promotional CD single
No.	Title	Length
1.	"How Do I Get There" (Edit)	3:29
2.	"How Do I Get There" (Album Version)	4:09
3.	"Suggested Research Hook 1"	0:12
4.	"Suggested Research Hook 2"	0:08

== Personnel ==
Taken from the Did I Shave My Legs for This? booklet.

- Biff Watson – acoustic guitar
- Cary Park – acoustic guitar, electric guitar
- Joe Chaney – bass guitar
- Greg Morrow – drums, percussion
- Brent Rowan – electric guitar
- Larry Franklin – mandolin
- John Hobbs – keyboards, piano

Recorded by Steve Marcantonio with assistance by Tim Waters at Emerald Studios in Nashville, Tennessee.

== Charts ==
=== Weekly charts ===
Chart (1997)	Peak position
Canada Country Singles (RPM)	2
US Hot Country Songs (Billboard)	1

=== Year-end charts ===
Chart (1997)	Position
Canada Country Tracks (RPM)	41
US Country Songs (Billboard)	23
