= Old Oaks Farm =

Landmark Historic House

Coordinates: 36.64306°N 87.12167°W

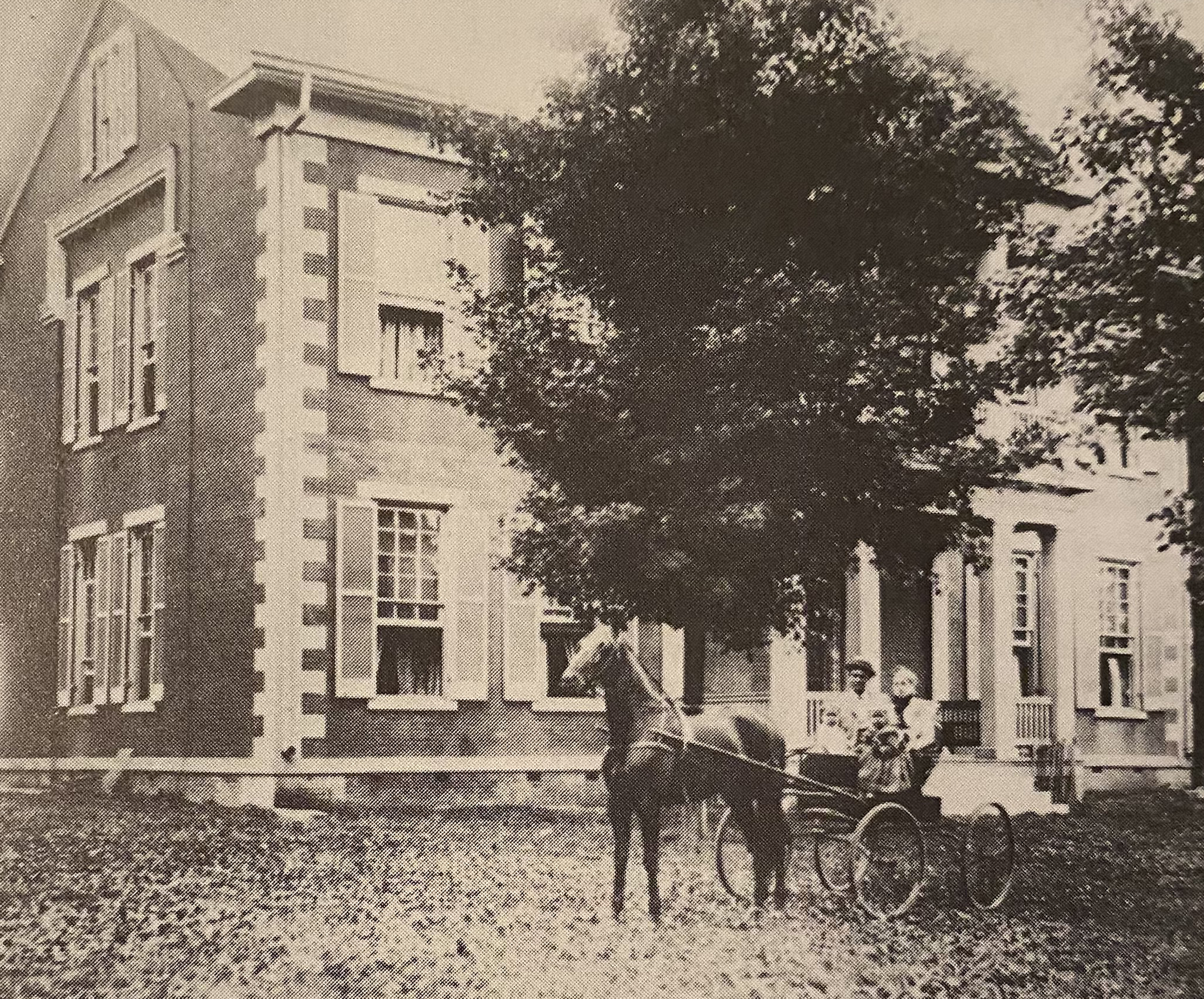
Photograph of the Old Oaks Ranges Farm mansion with the Northington Family seated in a carriage

Old Oaks Ranges Farm is a historic home in Guthrie, Todd County, Kentucky, United States. The farm has played an important role in the development of some of the most recognized and influential artistic works in poetry and music, and is significant as an example of 19th century Greek-Revival architecture inspired by Minard Lafever's The Modern Builder's Guide published in 1841.

== Mansion and grounds ==
=== Architecture ===
Old Oaks is a brick transitional Greek Revival and Italianate style 33-room residence that was commissioned by Dorell B. Smith and was likely completed sometime around 1872. Built on a raised limestone foundation, the eastern facing entrance façade is a two-story, five-bay temple form elevation with a side-facing gabled roof, with four French end chimneys. A central two-story pedimented portico in the Greek Revival-style has been altered from its original configuration of a double-story porch into a colossal style columned portico. The two-story portico contains four, square Doric columns with smooth shafts. An added iron balcony is mounted to the second floor facade porch door replacing an earlier second level porch. Old Oaks mansion has various components of Minard Lafever's patterns from Lafever's book, The Modern Building's Guide published in 1841, including the egg-and-dart surround of the front entry door, the engaged pilasters and arrangement of the pocket door surrounds in the parlor and dining rooms, in the buildings door leafs, door casings, and in the arrangement of the facade's second-story doorway. The building also possesses Italianate features in the form of its paired windows, original quoin corners, and bracketed eaves on the south and north elevations. A singular Gothic Revival influence is located in the form of its pointed arch window located in the original porch pediment.

=== Interior ===
The mansion is composed primarily as a “hall and parlor” plan, with a central hallway spanning two floors. When positioned according to the most prominent breezes outside, central hallways assist in the passive cooling of a home. Old Oaks possesses an abundant use of transoms over doorways allowing hot air to rise to the ceilings of rooms to circulate out of the house via cross-breezes flowing through the central hall when its exterior doors were opened in the warm summer months. During the cold winter months, rooms downstairs and upstairs could be individually heated, as each room contains a fireplace. When the doors and overhead transoms to these rooms remained closed, heat could be trapped inside the space and prevented from rising up the central hallway's staircase.

The entire western portion of the residence is dedicated to service staff with a clear delineation between family areas, and service areas. The family's spaces are contained within the eastern most double-story portion of the house where the main entrance is located, while the servants areas was dedicated to the western three stories of the mansion with its own separate rear entrance. Within this service space, staff could move freely through kitchen, scullery, pantry, servants quarters, and through the residence's various family rooms virtually undetected by the family & guests.

=== Grounds ===
The original approach road that is directed towards the Hadensville railroad station, is framed by a closely spaced allée of Sugar Maple trees. According to oral history, it's believed that the 12 oaks trees once planted here have all died and were later replaced with maples planted closer to the drive to preserve farm fields on the left and right of the approach road. Originally, the drive terminated in a carriage loop around the front of the mansion, complete with carriage steps and two hitching posts. The property retains its original smokehouse.

=== Smith Family ===
As the nation began to heal from the Civil War, in 1866 profits in agriculture began to improve in the region. In 1871, Dorrell's wife Olivia is listed in census data as keeping house, or managing the Smith household. His children Mattie (18), Emeline (16), Willie (14), Olivia (10), Belford (8), Marion “Birdie” (4) were under the tutelage of a live-in school teacher. Dorell's property was destroyed by arson in October 1871 when his personal residence, tenant houses, and his personal belongings were consumed in fire. Dorell did not have insurance on his personal estate. Part of this fire may have included the burning of Dorell's Tobacco Factory for which insurance denied his claim for replacement. By 1872, Dorell increased his land holdings by 367 acres for a total of nearly 800 acres. Extravagant purchases appear on tax rolls as he was levied for a piano, gold and silver holdings, and a pleasure carriage. By 1875, Dorell farmed at least 1,280 acres and produced over 35,000 pounds of tobacco, 1500 bushels of corn, and 500 bushels of wheat annually. As his farm profits and production grew in the 1870s, Dorell turned his attention to politics, and represented Todd County in the State Legislature in 1876 and 1877, serving only one term.

By 1880, Dorrel's household was mixed with boarders, family, and servants. His wife Olivia and children Belford and “Birdie” Marion were still living at home. Two engineers possibly in the area for the railroad were Isaac Boyd and Robert Black. These men lived with the family as boarders and may have likewise had a business relationship with Dorell. Also in the household was a domestic servant named July Gray. Farm laborers John Pendleton and Frank Porterfield also occupied the home. Kate Ingram, who was the family's cook. Well into the late 19th century, Dorell Smith engaged in local business pursuits, including the creation of the Guthrie Fairgrounds. In 1885, Smith made headlines for raising prize holstein cattle that brought prices as high as $750 each.

=== Nothington Family ===
Watkins Northington and his brother Warren inherited exceptional wealth from his maternal line. Their grandfather William Watkins was a planter and owned large parcels of land in Logan County, Kentucky, while claiming vast parcels of real estate in Nashville, Tennessee. At the age of 21, Watkins and his brother purchased Old Oaks Farm in equal shares. From May to December 1894, the brothers renovated the house, adding plumbing, including hot and cold water, installed by Ed. C. Bates & Co of Clarksville, Tennessee. Watkins married Clarksville native Annie Young Watkins. Annie is responsible for naming the house “Old Oaks.” Shortly after completion of their renovations of the Old Oaks mansion, the couple began a family of seven children in order of age, Walton, Watkins II, Thad, Billy, Paul and Ruth. The servants quarters at the west portion of Old Oaks mansion was occupied by three servants. West Mitchell, Alace Kirby, and Charles Tender served the Northington family. Watkins operated Old Oaks Farm partially as a gentleman's hobby farm, and established a small Saddlebred horse breeding operation. Advertisements for equine services at the farm appear throughout the late 19th and early 20th centuries promoting his equine bloodlines. Two notable horses owned by Watkins include “Grace M.,” a bay mare, bred by his neighbor Robert Lester, and “Paul N.” Watkins likewise participated in the breeding of fine English Setters, and advertised breeding services for this line of sporting dog under the name, "Queen A."

Ruth Northington married on October 22, 1919, to Walter Morton Wellman of Huntsville, Alabama in the parlor of the Old Oaks mansion. Wellman was the son of Williard Wellman, an industrialist and heir to a large fortune derived from textile manufacturing. Wellman's family owned cotton mills and were early pioneers of the Huntsville area. Today, Wellman Family Park remains in Huntsville, as well a bronze statue dedicated in Williard Wellman's honor. According to family tradition, Walter Wellman and Ruth Northington met in 1918. Ruth was asked by Wellman's sister, a college friend of Ruth's, to travel to Huntsville to attend the rehearsal dinner of a mutual friend, as the blind-date of her brother Wellman. Exclaiming that he would, “...not escort a girl that he had never met!” Wellman hid behind a boxcar at the train station as Ruth disembarked the train. He quickly acquiesced upon first sight of Ruth, and the couple were married after a short period of courting.

The fourth child born to Watkins and Annie Northington, Thad was a born at Old Oaks Farm in 1903. He married Willie Hampton in September 1926. Thad attended local primary and high schools, and was educated at Bowling Green Business University. He primarily worked as a farmer, a tobacco buyer, and later owned an antiques shop and restaurant. The couple had one son, Teddy Northington, born on November 12, 1932, who died at the age of five on March 4, 1937, from an automobile accident where Teddy fell from a moving car. Teddy struck and fractured his head on a hard surface when he accidentally triggered the car door open. The couple designed and planted a garden directly in front of Old Oaks mansion in his memory in the shape of a heart made of field rock and planted with peonies, lilacs, and day- lilies. The next year in 1938, the couple sold Old Oaks Farm to Edgar Selden Allison. Years later in 1953, Thad and his wife bought an historic inn in nearby Guthrie constructed by John Gray in 1836, known as the “Stagecoach Inn.” Together the couple operated the inn as a popular restaurant and antique shop.

=== True Love, by Robert Penn Warren ===
In 1985, Robert Penn Warren published the poem True Love based on his attraction and youthful interactions with Ruth Northington, daughter of Watkins Northington. The poem illustrates the narrator's memories of a naive attraction, causing them to reflect nostalgically onto a youthful understanding of unrequited love. The last born of Watkins and Annie Northington's seven children was a girl delivered in Old Oaks mansion in 1895 that they named Ruth. Ruth's brothers adored their little sister and looked after her. Ruth was an exceptionally beautiful young woman, and it is through her attractive personality and appearance that Old Oaks mansion was featured in Warren's work.

=== Strawberry Wine, by Deana Carter ===
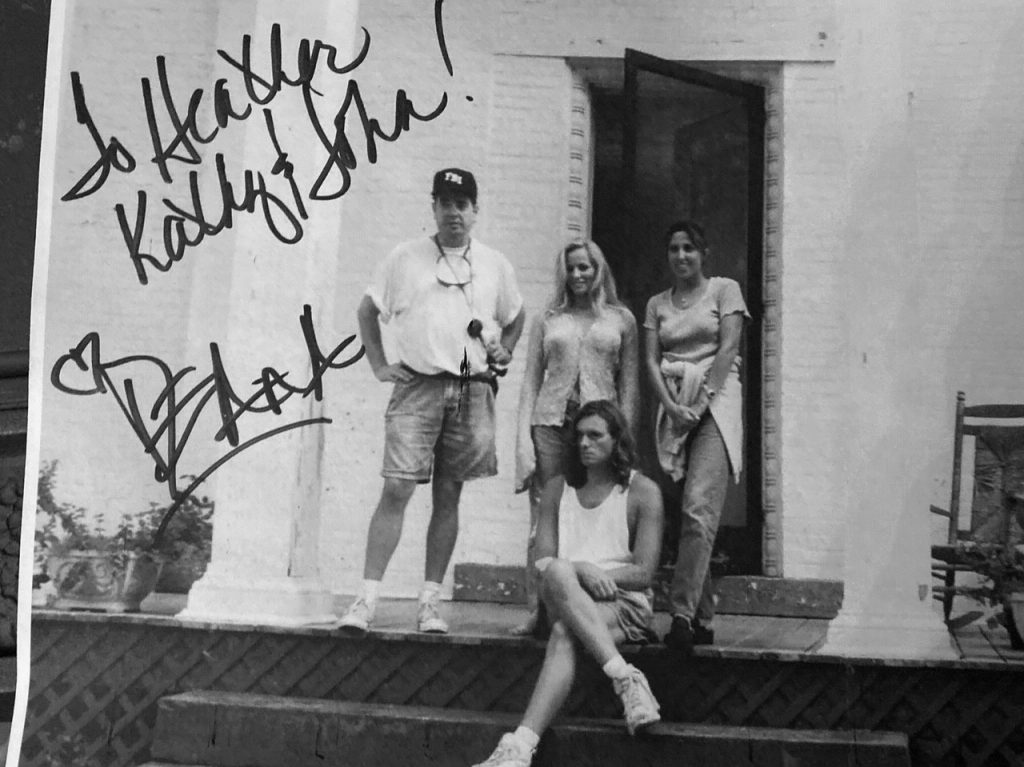
Autographed Photo of Deana Carter at Old Oaks Farm from the filming of the music video Strawberry Wine

One of the most influential songs of the 90's decade hit the country music genre in 1996, named Strawberry Wine. The song, performed by country-music vocalist Deana Carter, quickly rose to the top of the charts, capturing the number one spot on Billboard's Us Hot Country Songs for two weeks in November 1996, and 65 on the U.S. Billboard Hot 100. Deana Carter recorded Strawberry Wine in 1995 for her album, Did I Shave My Legs for This? The song was produced by Chris Farren who subsequently won Country Producer of the Year from Songwriter Magazine. After Strawberry Wine's release on August 17, 1996, Deana Carter's album sold over 5,000,000 copies. The song has sold over 1,000,000 digital copies and is streamed millions of times annually.

In 1996, a music video was produced by Roger Pistole using the interior and exterior of Old Oaks mansion. Scenes from in and around Guthrie, Kentucky, including the surrounding farm fields and Fairgrounds Road fields were also used in the video. Guthrie and Old Oaks Farm was proposed as the setting for the video by a filming location scout, Mark Fenton that formerly lived in Paducah, Kentucky. Fenton remembered coming through Guthrie as a child before I-24 was constructed, and all traffic to Paducah necessitated travel through Guthrie. Fenton pulled into the driveway, and knocked on the door of Old Oaks mansion asking if they would be interested in having Old Oaks featured in the music video to which the owners of Old Oaks, John and Kathy Hansen, agreed. Thereafter, the producer Roger Pistole came to tour the property. The video took a full day to shoot, and was filmed during both rain and fair weather.

=== Present Ownership ===
Old Oaks Ranges Farm mansion and the remaining 4.5 acres surrounding the mansion is currently owned by Keith & Angela Range. The property is currently used as their personal home with the exterior grounds open to the public as a photography rental location.

In popular culture

- The music video for Deana Carter's number one hit song "Strawberry Wine" was entirely shot at Old Oaks and the surrounding landscape.
- National Poet Laureate Robert Penn Warren's poem "True Love," is set at Old Oaks and describes the Northington family that occupied the mansion during his childhood.

== See also ==
- Deana Carter, Female Vocalist, Country Music
- Robert Penn Warren, National Poet Laureate, Poet
- Strawberry Wine, American Country Music Song
