= Joe Scaife =

American music producer (1955–2024)

- Birth name: Joe Carlos Scaife
- Born: November 26, 1955; Helena, Arkansas, U.S.
- Origin: Nashville, Tennessee, U.S.
- Died: June 12, 2024 (aged 68); Franklin, Tennessee, U.S.
- Genres: Country
- Occupation: Record producer
- Years active: early 1980s-2024

Joe Carlos Scaife (November 26, 1955 – June 12, 2024) was an American music producer and recording engineer based in Nashville, who produced many mainstream country hit records over a 25 year span in the late 20th and early 21st century. Among them are K.T. Oslin's "80s Ladies", Billy Ray Cyrus' "Achy Breaky Heart", and the Gretchen Wilson's songs "Redneck Woman" and "Here for the Party". The hallmark of Scaife's career was his ability to recognize potential in unknown performers, then pair the newcomers with perfect country songs that fit them. He first learned record production from his father, Cecil Scaife, who was a prominent record executive. Joe Scaife attended Belmont University, and his connection at Belmont sparked interest by his family to advocate for the establishment of a school of music there; the idea evolved into the Mike Curb College of Entertainment and Music Business. As a music producer, engineer and singer, Joe Scaife was responsible for selling 80 million records.

== Early life ==
Scaife was born in Arkansas. His father was Cecil Scaife (1927–2009), a pioneering record executive at Memphis' Sun Records and Columbia Records. The Scaife family moved to Nashville where Joe started first grade, and remained in Nashville the rest of his life. His mother was Sherytha Paine. In his youth, he developed as a songwriter, percussionist, and background singer. His father became the head of his own Nashville recording and publishing firm, "Music Incorporated". The younger Scaife graduated from Belmont University with a degree in music business, and became skilled in engineering and production while working at his father's side in his Hall of Fame Studio. The younger Scaife's talent for sound engineering began to emerge in the 1980s, as he contributed to albums for some of country music's major acts, including Reba McEntire, Alabama, Glen Campbell, Kathy Mattea, and Lionel Richie. During this period, he met and later married Daniella Godwin when she was working on Music Row. Their children are Jaela and Tristan.

== Career ==
Scaife partnered with engineer Jim Cotton (1947–2003), and often co-produced with Harold Shedd at Music Mill studio. By 1984, his career began to move into production in addition to sound engineering.

His career took off with his co-production (with Shedd and Cotton) of the 1988 song "80s Ladies", written and performed by K.T. Oslin. It won "CMA Song of the Year" and was listed by Rolling Stone as one of the "200 Best Country Songs Ever." Music critic Robert K. Oermann called it "the anthem of a generation". With the success of 80s Ladies Scaife's skill was noticed, and he was chosen more as producer, but still engineered recordings by top stars: George Jones, Waylon Jennings, Shania Twain and Toby Keith.

In the 1990s, Scaife suggested a song called "Achy Breaky Heart" to Billy Ray Cyrus. The song had been around for years, being released on unsuccessful recordings. The Marcy Brothers recorded it with a different title, "Don't Tell My Heart". It had been turned down by the Oak Ridge Boys because lead singer Duane Allen did not like the words "achy breaky". Nevertheless, when Scaife played the demo for Cyrus, Cyrus immediately said, "That's Me. That's mine. That's my song." Scaife's production of it was released on Cyrus' album Some Gave All in 1992. The song became a world-wide hit, topping charts in Australia and the UK. It was a crossover hit in the US and contributed to the popularity of line dancing It won both Scaife and Cotton a CMA Award for"single of the year."

In 2003, Scaife produced the song "Redneck Woman", a song by a former bartender at Nashville's Printer's Alley named Gretchen Wilson. Critic Markus K. Dowling called it an "iconic swampy, rocking country classic". It sold 5 million albums and won a Grammy and CMA awards.

== Death and legacy ==
Scaife died in Franklin, Tennessee on June 12, 2024, at the age of 68.

Scaife and his family lobbied Belmont University to pursue the creation a music business program, a dream championed by his father Cecil Scaife. It eventually led to the creation of Belmont's "The Mike Curb College of Entertainment and Music Business", a successful institution that reached its 50th anniversary as of 2024. Joe Scaife and his two sisters created the "Cecil Scaife Endowed Scholarship" to provide financial assistance to prospective students.
