= Here for the Party =

- Standard edition cover

Studio album by Gretchen Wilson
- Released: May 11, 2004
- Studio: Sony/Tree (Nashville, Tennessee); Blackbird (Nashville, Tennessee); Sixteenth Avenue Sound (Nashville, Tennessee)
- Genre: Country
- Length: 37:36
- Label: Epic Nashville
- Producer: Joe Scaife; Mark Wright; John Rich (associate producer)

Gretchen Wilson chronology
Here for the Party (2004)	All Jacked Up (2005)

Singles from Here for the Party
- 1. "Redneck Woman" Released: March 23, 2004; 2. "Here for the Party" Released: July 1, 2004; 3. "When I Think About Cheatin'" Released: October 25, 2004; 4. "Homewrecker" Released: February 21, 2005

Here for the Party is the debut studio album by American country music singer Gretchen Wilson. It was released on May 11, 2004, through Epic Records Nashville. After singing in a bar, she met John Rich of Big & Rich, who invited her to work with him. She would later join the MuzikMafia, a collection of Nashville singers and songwriters that gathered weekly to play songs. Wilson recorded the album in Nashville, Tennessee. The album was produced by Joe Scaife, Mark Wright, and John Rich.

Upon its release, Here for the Party received positive reviews from music critics with Wilson being compared to country artist Loretta Lynn. The album itself became a massive success, debuting at number two on the Billboard 200 with first-week sales of 227,000 copies, breaking the record for the highest first sales week from a debut album by a country artist. On the Top Country Albums chart, the album broke records and became the third most successful album of 2004 on the latter chart. Internationally the album became a surprise moderate success, peaking within the top ten in Sweden while entering the album charts in Australia, Norway, and the United Kingdom.

Four single were released in total from the album. The lead and Wilson's debut single "Redneck Woman" became a massive success, spending five weeks atop the US Hot Country Songs chart. The follow-up singles "Here for the Party", "When I Think About Cheatin'", and "Homewrecker" were also successful, all peaking within the top five of the country charts as well.

At the 47th Annual Grammy Awards in 2005, Wilson received four nominations: Best New Artist, Best Country Album, Best Country Song for "Redneck Woman" and Best Female Country Vocal Performance also for "Redneck Woman", with Wilson winning the latter award. As of 2023, Here for the Party is certified 5× Platinum by the RIAA for sales of five million copies sold in the United States alone.

== Making of the album ==
Gretchen Wilson was singing in a bar when she met John Rich of Big & Rich, who invited her to work with him. After some persistence, she agreed and joined the MuzikMafia, an informal group of Nashville singers and songwriters that gathered weekly to play songs.

Wilson signed with Epic Records in 2003 and went in the studio with producers Mark Wright and Joe Scaife and Rich as co-producer. The first single, "Redneck Woman," was written as a tribute to women from small-town America.

== Reception ==
Professional ratings
Review scores
Source	Rating
About.com	4/5 stars
AllMusic	4/5 stars
Entertainment Weekly	B+
Q	3/5 stars
Robert Christgau	(2-star Honorable Mention)
Rolling Stone	4/5 stars
Stylus Magazine	B
USA Today	3/4 stars

"Redneck Woman" was released as a single in early 2004 and reached the top of the Billboard country singles charts and number 22 on the Billboard Hot 100. The album was released in the U.S. on May 11, 2004. It debuted at the top of the country album charts and at number two on the Billboard 200 with 227,000 copies sold. Here for the Party was the fifth best selling album of 2004, with about 2.9 million copies sold.

== Track listing ==
No.	Title	Writer(s)	Length
1.	"Here for the Party"	Gretchen Wilson; Big Kenny; John Rich	3:18
2.	"Redneck Woman"	Wilson; Rich	3:42
3.	"When I Think About Cheatin'"	Wilson; Vicky McGehee; Rich	4:09
4.	"Homewrecker"	Wilson; Rivers Rutherford; George Teren	3:26
5.	"Holdin' You"	Wade Kirby; Thom McHugh	3:34
6.	"Chariot"	John Caldwell; Leslie Satcher	4:26
7.	"What Happened"	Al Anderson; Bekka Bramlett; Bob DiPiero; Tim Nichols	3:51
8.	"When It Rains"	Wilson; McGehee; Rich	3:03
9.	"The Bed" (featuring Big & Rich)	Keith Anderson; McGehee; Rich	2:53
10.	"Pocahontas Proud"	Wilson; McGehee; Rich	5:15

== Credits ==
Compiled from liner notes. Musicians and Vocals

- Gretchen Wilson – lead vocals, backing vocals
- Steve Nathan – pianos, Hammond B3 organ
- Reese Wynans – pianos, Hammond B3 organ
- Tom Bukovac – electric guitars
- Kenny Greenberg – electric guitars
- John Rich – acoustic guitars, backing vocals
- John Willis – acoustic guitars
- Al Anderson – gut-string guitar
- Mike Brignardello – baritone guitar, bass guitar
- Michael Rhodes –baritone guitar, bass guitar
- Russ Pahl – banjo, lap steel guitar, steel guitar
- Larry Franklin – mandolin, fiddle
- Greg Morrow – drums, percussion
- Eric Darken – percussion
- Wes Hightower – backing vocals
- Big Kenny – backing vocals
- Angela Primm – backing vocals
- Joe Scaife – backing vocals
- Trez – backing vocals
- Gale West – backing vocals

Production

- Clay Bradley – A&R direction
- Joe Scaife – producer
- Mark Wright – producer
- John Rich – co-producer
- Greg Droman – tracking
- Bart Pursley – overdub recording, vocal recording, mixing
- Todd Gunnerson – tracking assistant, additional overdub recording
- Steve Marcantonio – additional overdub recording
- Paul Hart – mix assistant
- Lowell Reynolds – mix assistant
- Hank Williams – at MasterMix (Nashville, Tennessee)
- Tonya Derry – A&R coordinator
- Kay Smith – A&R coordinator
- Carie Higdon – project coordinator
- Sylvia Meiler – creative producer
- Tracy Baskette-Fleaner – art direction, design
- Deb Haus – art direction, artist development
- Glen Rose – photography
- Mike Penner – additional photography
- Morris Management Group – management

== Chart performances ==
=== Weekly charts ===
Chart (2004)	Peak position
Australian Albums (ARIA)	21
Norwegian Albums (VG-lista)	14
Scottish Albums (OCC)	33
Swedish Albums (Sverigetopplistan)	7
UK Albums (OCC)	60
US Billboard 200	2
US Top Country Albums (Billboard)	1

=== Year-end charts ===
Chart (2004)	Position
US Billboard 200	19
US Top Country Albums (Billboard)	3
Worldwide Albums (IFPI)	14

Chart (2005)	Position
US Billboard 200	23
US Top Country Albums (Billboard)	4

Chart (2006)	Position
US Top Country Albums (Billboard)	40

== Certifications ==
Region	Certification
Australia (ARIA)	Gold
Canada (Music Canada)	Platinum
United States (RIAA)	5× Platinum
