= There's No Limit =

- Australian CD single cover

Single by Deana Carter

from the album I'm Just a Girl
- B-side: "Ordinary" "Wildflower"
- Released: October 21, 2002
- Genre: country pop; pop rock
- Length: 3:29
- Label: Arista Nashville
- Songwriters: Deana Carter; Randy Scruggs
- Producers: Deana Carter; Dann Huff

Deana Carter singles chronology
"Ruby Brown" (1999)	"There's No Limit" (2002)	"I'm Just a Girl" (2003)

Music video
- "There's No Limit" at CMT.com

"There's No Limit" is a song by American country music artist Deana Carter, recorded for her fourth studio album I'm Just a Girl (2003). Carter co-wrote and co-produced the single, writing it with Randy Scruggs and producing it with Dann Huff. It was released by Arista Nashville on October 21, 2002, as Carter's first single for the record label, and the lead single from the album. It is also Carter's first official charting song since "Ruby Brown" peaked at number 74 on the RPM Country Tracks chart in late 1999.

It peaked at number 14 on the US Hot Country Songs chart, marking her highest chart entry since "How Do I Get There" (1997). It is also her last top-20 single to date.

== Content ==
The song, written by Deana Carter with Randy Scruggs, is a moderate up-tempo backed by electric guitar with occasional harpsichord fills. Its lyrics are essentially of how Carter tells her male lover that she will do anything for him:

If it's a long, long road, baby, I'll walk it
If it's a mountain high, baby, I'll cross it
If it's a deep blue sky, you know, I'll jump out in it
There's nothin' I would not do for you, there's no limit

== Critical reception ==
Deborah Evans Price of Billboard gave a mostly favorable review saying, "Carter sounds great but would benefit from cleaner production. At times the track sounds a little too busy [...] That aside, it's still an impressive record that should re-establish Carter at country radio."

== Music video ==
Randee St. Nicholas directed the music video. In the video, Carter and her boyfriend are seen talking on the phone. Carter sings and plays her guitar in her bedroom, and is later joined by her boyfriend. The video concludes with the two crawling under the sheets of her bed and kissing, while the chorus plays. The music video premiered on CMT (Country Music Television) on December 25, 2002.

The video became a huge success, topping the CMT Top Twenty Countdown on April 17, 2003; it was ranked by the network at number 29 on the 2008 version of their "40 Sexiest Videos." "There's No Limit" would be nominated at the 2003 CMT Flameworthy Awards for Hottest Female Video of the Year. While the video has not been available on platforms such as YouTube, it is available on both Apple Music and the Internet Archive.

== Commercial performance ==
"There's No Limit" debuted on the US Billboard Hot Country Songs chart (then titled Hot Country Singles & Tracks) the week of October 26, 2002, at number 54, becoming her first chart entry since "Angels Working Overtime" reached number 35 in 1999. The song would reach a peak position of number 14 on the chart the week of April 5, 2003. The song spent 26 weeks in total on the chart, becoming Carter's longest charting single to date.

The track debuted on the Radio & Records Country Top 50 the week of October 25, 2002, at number 41, becoming the highest debut of the week. On the final issue of the year dated December 20, 2002, the song had risen to number 25 in its ninth week. "There's No Limit" would go on to peak at number 11 on March 28, 2003. The song would go on to spend 24 weeks, its last being on April 18, 2003 at number 22.

== Track listing ==
Australian CD single
No.	Title	Length
1.	"There's No Limit"	3:35
2.	"Ordinary"	4:33
3.	"Wildflower"	4:17

== Charts ==
=== Weekly charts ===
Chart (2002–2003)	Peak position
US Country Top 50 (Radio & Records)	11
US Hot Country Songs (Billboard)	14
US Bubbling Under Hot 100 (Billboard)	2

=== Year-end charts ===
Chart (2003)	Position
US Country Songs (Billboard)	54
US Country (Radio & Records)	61

== Release history ==
Release dates and format(s) for "There's No Limit"
Region	Date	Format(s)	Label(s)	Ref.
United States	October 21, 2002	Country radio	Arista Nashville	
