= When I Think About Cheatin' =

Single by Gretchen Wilson

from the album Here for the Party
- B-side: "Homewrecker"
- Released: October 25, 2004
- Genre: Countrypolitan
- Length: 4:09
- Label: Epic Nashville
- Songwriters: Gretchen Wilson; John Rich; Vicky McGehee
- Producers: Joe Scaife; Mark Wright

Gretchen Wilson singles chronology
"Here for the Party" (2004)	"When I Think About Cheatin'" (2004)	"Homewrecker" (2005)

"When I Think About Cheatin'" is a song co-written and recorded by American country music singer Gretchen Wilson. It was the third single from her debut album, Here for the Party, and was released to radio in October 2004. The song was her third consecutive Top Ten hit, reaching No. 4 on the country singles charts. Wilson wrote this song with John Rich and Vicky McGehee.

== Content ==
In "When I Think About Cheatin'," the female narrator states that she resists the temptation of infidelity because the possibility of losing her current relationship would be too much for her to bear. The song is performed in the style of the Nashville sound.

== Music video ==
The video for the song was filmed in the historic Ryman Auditorium and features Wilson imagining she is performing on the Grand Ole Opry, with holograms of Opry legends joining her and her band.

== Critical reception ==
Johnny Loftus of Allmusic said that Wilson was "convincing" in her delivery, and that the inclusion of a ballad on the album gave it "some depth." Kevin John Coyne, reviewing the song for Country Universe, gave it a positive rating. He says that the song proves that Wilson is more than just a "Redneck Woman"

== Chart performance ==
"When I Think About Cheatin'" debuted on the Billboard Hot Country Songs charts dated for the week ending October 30, 2004. The song peaked at No. 4, holding that position for one week and spending twenty weeks on the charts.

Chart (2004–2005)	Peak position
Canada Country (Radio & Records)	2
US Billboard Hot 100	39
US Hot Country Songs (Billboard)	4

=== Year-end charts ===
Chart (2005)	Position
US Country Songs (Billboard)	41
