= The Chain (album) =

Studio album by Deana Carter
- Released: October 9, 2007 (US)
- Genre: Country
- Length: 53:43
- Label: Vanguard
- Producer: Deana Carter

Deana Carter chronology
The Story of My Life (2005)	The Chain (2007)	Southern Way of Life (2013)

Singles from The Chain
- 1. "On the Road Again" Released: 2007

Professional ratings
Review scores
Source	Rating
About.com	link
Allmusic	link

The Chain is the sixth studio album by American country singer/songwriter Deana Carter, first released in 2007. The album peaked at #60 on the US Country chart. The first and only single off the album, "On the Road Again," was released in 2007, failing to land on the chart. All the tracks on the album consist of cover songs, and many are duets with artists, such as Dolly Parton and George Jones. The record was intended as a tribute to her father, Fred Carter Jr., and many of Deana Carter's heroes.

== Track listing ==
No.	Title	Writer(s)	Length
1.	"Crying"	Joe Melson, Roy Orbison	4:39
2.	"Help Me Make It Through the Night" (with Kris Kristofferson)	Kris Kristofferson	4:03
3.	"Love Is Like a Butterfly" (with Dolly Parton)	Dolly Parton	3:33
4.	"The Boxer" (with Harper Simon and Paul Simon)	Paul Simon	6:13
5.	"Lay Lady Lay"	Bob Dylan	5:05
6.	"The Weight"	Robbie Robertson	4:54
7.	"I'm Not Lisa" (with Jessi Colter)	Mirriam Eddy	4:28
8.	"Swingin'" (with John Anderson)	John Anderson, Lionel Delmore	4:21
9.	"On the Road Again" (with Willie Nelson)	Willie Nelson	3:49
10.	"Good Hearted Woman" (with Shooter Jennings)	Waylon Jennings, Nelson	4:17
11.	"He Still Thinks I Care" (with George Jones)	Dickey Lee	3:43
12.	"Old Man"	Neil Young	4:38

== Personnel ==
- John Anderson - vocals on "Swingin'"
- Deana Carter - lead vocals, background vocals
- Fred Carter Jr. - acoustic guitar, electric guitar, classical guitar
- Jeff Carter - electric guitar
- Jessi Colter - vocals on "I'm Not Lisa"
- Dan Dugmore - acoustic guitar, steel guitar, mandolin
- Shooter Jennings - vocals on "Good Hearted Woman"
- George Jones - vocals on "He Thinks I Still Care"
- Shawn Jones - electric guitar
- Kris Kristofferson - vocals on "Help Me Make It Through the Night"
- Randy Leago - accordion, flute, keyboards, organ, piano
- Willie Nelson - vocals on "On the Road Again"
- Dolly Parton - vocals on "Love Is Like a Butterfly"
- Harper Simon - electric guitar and vocals on "The Boxer"
- Paul Simon - acoustic guitar on "The Boxer"
- Kyle Woodring - drums
- Glenn Worf - bass guitar
- Andrea Zonn - viola, violin

== Chart performance ==
Chart (2007)	Peak Position
U.S. Billboard Top Country Albums	60
