= I'm Just a Girl =

Album by Deana Carter

Studio album by Deana Carter
- Released: March 18, 2003 (US)
- Genre: Country
- Length: 46:45
- Label: Arista Nashville
- Producers: Deana Carter; Dann Huff

Deana Carter chronology
The Deana Carter Collection (2002)	I'm Just a Girl (2003)	The Story of My Life (2005)

Singles from I'm Just a Girl
- 1. "There's No Limit" Released: October 21, 2002; 2. "I'm Just a Girl" Released: May 5, 2003

Professional ratings
Review scores
Source	Rating
About.com	(not rated) link
AllMusic	link

I'm Just a Girl is the fourth studio album by American country music singer Deana Carter, released on March 18, 2003, via Arista Nashville.

== Background ==
After parting ways with Capitol Nashville in 2001, and following her divorce from her ex-husband of five years Chris DiCorce, recording for the album took place primarily in Carter's home, her first record to do so. I'm Just a Girl is described as being a more upbeat album compared to her previous records.

The album spawned two singles: "There's No Limit" and its title track. "There's No Limit" was released in October 2002 and became Carter's first top 20 hit in four years, peaking at number 14 on the Billboard Hot Country Songs chart. The title track was released in May 2003 as the second and final single, becoming a minor top 40 hit on the same chart. "You and Tequila", a song which Carter wrote with Matraca Berg, would later be recorded by Kenny Chesney for his 13th album Hemingway's Whiskey (2010). His version featured Grace Potter and was released as that album's fourth single. It received a nomination at the 54th Annual Grammy Awards in 2012 for Best Country Song.

== Track listing ==
All tracks written by Deana Carter, co-writers are noted.

I'm Just a Girl track listing
No.	Title	Writer(s)	Length
1.	"I'm Just a Girl"	Billy Mann	3:34
2.	"There's No Limit"	Randy Scruggs	3:29
3.	"You and Tequila"	Matraca Berg	3:43
4.	"Me and the Radio"	Chuck Jones	4:21
5.	"Cover of a Magazine"	Wendy Waldman	4:40
6.	"Wildflower"	Jones	4:17
7.	"Twice As Worth It"	Rivers Rutherford	4:06
8.	"Eddie"		2:50
9.	"Waiting" (duet with Dwight Yoakam)	Dwight Yoakam	4:36
10.	"Liar"	Chris Lindsey; Aimee Mayo	2:29
11.	"Goodbye Train"	Berg	4:33
12.	"Girls' Night"		4:07
Total length:			46:45

== Personnel ==
- Matraca Berg - acoustic guitar, background vocals
- Bekka Bramlett - background vocals
- Deana Carter - chimes, acoustic guitar, synthesizer, lead vocals, background vocals
- Lisa Cochran - background vocals
- Eric Darken - percussion
- Dan Dugmore - dobro, acoustic guitar, electric guitar, lap steel guitar, pedal steel guitar
- Andrew Gold - background vocals
- John Hobbs - Hammond organ
- Dann Huff - electric guitar, steel guitar
- Chuck Jones - acoustic guitar
- Randy Leago - accordion, clarinet, saxophone, keyboards, Hammond organ, piano
- Chris McHugh - drums
- Billy Mann - electric guitar
- Greg Morrow - drums
- Steve Nathan - keyboards, Hammond organ
- Crystal Taliefero - background vocals
- John Willis - acoustic guitar
- Glenn Worf - bass guitar
- Dwight Yoakam - vocals on "Waiting"
- Jonathan Yudkin - banjo, cello, fiddle, mandolin, strings, background vocals

== Charts ==
=== Weekly charts ===
Chart (2003)	Peak Position
US Billboard 200	58
US Top Country Albums (Billboard)	6
