= Count Me In (Deana Carter song) =

Single by Deana Carter

from the album Did I Shave My Legs for This?
- B-side: "Did I Shave My Legs for This?"
- Released: March 17, 1997
- Genre: Country
- Length: 3:24
- Label: Capitol Nashville
- Songwriters: Deana Carter; Chuck Jones
- Producer: Chris Farren

Deana Carter singles chronology
"We Danced Anyway" (1996)	"Count Me In" (1997)	"How Do I Get There" (1997)

Music video
- Video on YouTube

"Count Me In" is a song written by Chuck Jones and co-written and recorded by American country music artist Deana Carter. It was released on March 17, 1997 as the third single from her debut album Did I Shave My Legs for This?. It was a Top 10 hit on both the Billboard Hot Country Singles & Tracks and Canadian RPM Country Singles charts.

== Content ==
The song is a soft love ballad, with the instrumentation starting lightly and building up towards the end with an electric guitar bridge. The song's lyrics speak of a narrator who is telling a lover what she does and doesn't want in her relationship.

== Music video ==
A music video was released for "Count Me In", directed by Michael McNamara. In the video, scenes of Carter singing in front of the camera are shot in color. Black and white is used when she is singing on a stage, signing autographs for her fans, and just acting silly for the camera.

== Chart performance ==
Chart (1997)	Peak position
Canada Country Singles (RPM)	7
US Hot Country Songs (Billboard)	5

=== Year-end charts ===
Chart (1997)	Position
Canada Country Tracks (RPM)	77
US Country Songs (Billboard)	30
