= The Story of My Life (Deana Carter album) =

Studio album by Deana Carter
- Released: March 8, 2005 (US)
- Recorded: 2004
- Studio: Little Big Guy Studios
- Genre: Country
- Length: 41:21
- Label: Vanguard
- Producer: Deana Carter

Deana Carter chronology
I'm Just a Girl (2003)	The Story of My Life (2005)	The Chain (2007)

Singles from The Story of My Life
- 1. "One Day at a Time" Released: March 2005; 2. "The Girl You Left Me For" Released: April 22, 2005; 3. "Sunny Day" Released: October 7, 2005; 4. "In a Heartbeat" Released: November 2006

Professional ratings
Review scores
Source	Rating
Allmusic	4/5 stars

The Story of My Life is the fifth studio album released by American country singer/songwriter Deana Carter. The album peaked at #26 on the U.S. Top Country Albums chart and #150 on the Billboard 200. "One Day at a Time" was released in March 2005 as the lead single, and entered the Billboard Hot Country Songs chart for the week of April 9, 2005 at #57. It peaked at #55 after three weeks, and returned to the charts for two additional weeks in late June/early July. Follow-up singles "The Girl You Left Me For," "Sunny Day," and "In a Heartbeat" did not chart.

== Track listing ==
1. "The Girl You Left Me For" (Deana Carter, James Michael) – 3:30
2. "One Day at a Time" (Carter) – 3:18
3. "Ordinary" (Carter, Hillary Lindsey, Troy Verges) – 4:15
4. "In a Heartbeat" (Carter, Michael) – 3:55
5. "Katie" (Carter) – 2:40
6. "Atlanta & Birmingham" (Carter) – 3:37
7. "She's Good for You" (Carter, Carolyn Dawn Johnson) – 3:34
8. "Not Another Love Song" (Carter) – 4:35
9. "Sunny Day" (Carter) – 5:16
10. "Getting Over You" (Carter, Lindsey, Verges) – 3:31
11. "The Story of My Life" (Carter) – 3:10

== Personnel ==
- Deana Carter – lead vocals, acoustic guitar, piano, electric guitar, synthesizer strings, synthesizer horns, background vocals
- Jeff Carter – electric guitar, acoustic guitar
- Randy Leago – keyboards, piano, synthesizer, flute, accordion
- Steve Mackey – bass guitar
- James Michael – drums, acoustic guitar, electric guitar, piano, programming, synthesizer, keyboards, background vocals
- Kyle Woodring – drums

== Charts ==
=== Album ===
Chart (2005)	Peak Position
U.S. Billboard Top Country Albums	26
U.S. Billboard 200	150
U.S. Billboard Top Independent Albums	9

=== Singles ===
Year	Single	Peak positions
Year	Single	US Country
2005	"One Day at a Time"	55
2005	"The Girl You Left Me For"	—
2005	"Sunny Day"	—
2006	"In a Heartbeat"	—
"—" denotes releases that did not chart
