= Absence of the Heart =

Single by Deana Carter

from the album Everything's Gonna Be Alright
- B-side: "Dickson County"
- Released: September 1998
- Genre: Country
- Length: 3:29
- Label: Capitol Nashville
- Songwriters: Deana Carter, Chris Farren, Chuck Jones
- Producers: Deana Carter, Chris Farren

Deana Carter singles chronology
"Did I Shave My Legs for This?" (1997)	"Absence of the Heart" (1998)	"You Still Shake Me" (1999)

"Absence of the Heart" is a song written by Chris Farren, Chuck Jones, and co-written and recorded by American country music artist Deana Carter. It was released in September 1998 as the lead-off single from album Everything's Gonna Be Alright. The song was her most successful from the album; it peaked at number 16 on the Hot Country Singles & Tracks and was her fifth Top 10 hit on the Canadian Country charts. "Absence of the Heart" became Carter's last single to chart on the U.S. Billboard Hot 100 to date.

== Content ==
The song is a soft love ballad that features a light instrumentation with acoustic guitars. The song's lyrics speak of a narrator who realizes that there is an "absence of the heart" in her relationship.

We live together separately
We don't want to fall apart
But every time we kiss there's an emptiness
An absence of the heart

== Music video ==
The music video for "Absence of the Heart" was directed by Roger Pistole. In the video, Carter is seen singing the song while in various rooms of a house; she stands beside a metal-framed bed with newspapers flying around her, looking at herself in mirrors that are in various locations, and looking through glass that has water pouring down it.

== Chart performance ==
"Absence of the Heart" spent a total of 20 weeks on the Billboard Hot Country Singles & Tracks chart, where it reached a peak position of number 16.

Chart (1998–1999)	Peak position
Canada Country Singles (RPM)	7
US Billboard Hot 100	83
US Hot Country Songs (Billboard)	16

=== Year-end charts ===
Chart (1998)	Position
Canada Country Tracks (RPM)	81
