= Redneck Woman =

2004 Gretchen Wilson song

Single by Gretchen Wilson

from the album Here for the Party
- B-side: "Rebel Child"; "It Ain't Easy"
- Released: March 15, 2004
- Studio: Sony/Tree (Nashville, Tennessee)
- Genre: Country
- Length: 3:42
- Label: Epic
- Songwriter(s): Gretchen Wilson; John Rich
- Producer(s): Mark Wright; Joe Scaife

Gretchen Wilson singles chronology
"Redneck Woman" (2004)	"Here for the Party" (2004)

"Redneck Woman" is the debut single of American country music artist Gretchen Wilson, released on March 15, 2004, from her debut studio album, Here for the Party (2004). Wilson co-wrote the song with John Rich. It is Wilson's only number-one single on the US Billboard Hot Country Singles & Tracks chart. The song also reached number 22 on the Billboard Hot 100. Internationally, the song found modest success in Australia, Ireland, and the United Kingdom, reaching number 50 on the Australian Singles Chart, number 45 on the Irish Singles Chart, and number 42 on the UK Singles Chart.

The song, which is considered Wilson's signature song, also earned a Grammy Award for Best Female Country Vocal Performance at the 47th Annual Grammy Awards in 2005. In June 2014, Rolling Stone ranked the song number 97 on the "100 Greatest Country Songs of All Time". In May 2024, Rolling Stone updated their rankings to include 200 songs, placing "Redneck Woman" at number 197.

== Chart performance ==
"Redneck Woman" spent five weeks at number one on the Hot Country Songs charts. In doing so, it became the first number-one hit on that chart for a female solo act since "Blessed" by Martina McBride in March–April 2002, and the first for Epic Records Nashville since "It Must Be Love" by Ty Herndon in December 1998. On the all-genre Billboard Hot 100, the song reached number 22, becoming Gretchen Wilson's highest-charting single on that chart.

Outside the United States, "Redneck Woman" proved to be a moderate success in three countries: Australia, Ireland, and the United Kingdom. In Australia, the song debuted and peaked at number 50 on the ARIA Singles Chart dated July 25, 2004, then fell out of the top 50 the next week. On the Irish Singles Chart, the track made its only appearance in the top 50 at number 45 on August 26, 2004. In the United Kingdom, the single garnered support from BBC Radio 2 and debuted at number 42—its peak—on August 29, 2004, then dropped to number 68 the following week before exiting the top 100 the week after.

== Music video ==
In the video, directed by David Hogan, Wilson is depicted performing in a western-style club with a live band, cage girls dancing in the background, and patrons in the crowd that are drinking beer. Scenes of Wilson driving a 1973–1987 General Motors pickup truck and a four-wheeler through the mud with two men are interspersed throughout the video. The video includes appearances from Kid Rock, Big & Rich, Tanya Tucker, and Hank Williams Jr., the latter two of whom are name-dropped in the song. In 2008, CMT voted the song number 11 on its list of the "100 Greatest Videos".

== Track listings ==
UK CD single

1. "Redneck Woman"
2. "Rebel Child"
3. "It Ain't Easy"
4. "Redneck Woman" (video)

Australian CD single

1. "Redneck Woman" (album version)
2. "Rebel Child"
3. "It Ain't Easy"

== Credits and personnel ==
Credits are taken from the Here for the Party album booklet.

Studios

- Recorded and overdubbed at Sony/Tree Studios (Nashville, Tennessee)
- Additional overdubs recorded at Blackbird Studio and 16th Avenue Sound (Nashville, Tennessee)
- Tracked at The Sound Kitchen (Franklin, Tennessee)
- Mixed at Blackbird Studio (Nashville, Tennessee)
- Mastered at MasterMix (Nashville, Tennessee)

Personnel

- Gretchen Wilson – writing, vocals
- John Rich – writing, acoustic guitar, associate producer
- John Willis – acoustic guitar
- Al Anderson – gut string guitar
- Tom Bukovac – electric guitar
- Kenny Greenberg – electric guitar
- Russ Pahl – lap steel guitar, steel guitar, banjo
- Mike Brignardello – bass guitar, baritone guitar
- Michael Rhodes – bass guitar, baritone guitar
- Larry Franklin – fiddle
- Steve Nathan – piano
- Greg Morrow – drums, percussion
- Eric Darken – percussion
- Mark Wright – production
- Joe Scaife – production
- Greg Droman – tracking
- Todd Gunnerson – tracking assistance, additional overdub recording
- Bart Pursley – recording, mixing
- Paul Hart – recording assistance, mixing assistance
- Steve Marcantonio – additional overdub recording
- Lowell Reynolds – mixing assistance
- Hank Williams – mastering
- Ronnie Thomas – editing

== Charts ==
=== Weekly charts ===
Chart (2004)	Peak position
Australia (ARIA)	50
Canada Country (Radio & Records)	1
Ireland (IRMA)	45
Scotland (OCC)	33
UK Singles (OCC)	42
US Billboard Hot 100	22
US Hot Country Songs (Billboard)	1

=== Year-end charts ===
Chart (2004)	Position
US Billboard Hot 100	97
US Country Songs (Billboard)	11

== Release history ==
Region	Date	Format(s)	Label(s)	Ref.
United States	March 15, 2004	Country radio	Epic	
Australia	July 12, 2004	CD	Epic	
United Kingdom	August 23, 2004	CD	Epic	

== "Redbird Fever" ==
In late 2004, Wilson recorded a re-written version, titled "Redbird Fever" to commemorate the St. Louis Cardinals' entering the World Series (as well as her devotion to the team). "Redbird Fever" spent one week at number 60 on the US Billboard Country Singles Chart dated for the week ending November 13, 2004.

== In popular culture ==
In "Enter Mr. DiMaggio", season one, episode three of the TV series Smash in 2012, Katharine McPhee's character Karen Cartwright performed the song in a karaoke bar.

== Parodies ==
American parody artist Cledus T. Judd released a parody of "Redneck Woman" titled "Paycheck Woman" on his 2004 album Bipolar and Proud.
