= Angels Working Overtime =

Single by Deana Carter

from the album Everything's Gonna Be Alright
- B-side: "Everything's Gonna Be Alright"
- Released: April 1999
- Genre: Country
- Length: 3:58 (radio edit); 5:22 (album version)
- Label: Capitol Nashville
- Songwriters: Michael Dulaney, Michael Lunn
- Producers: Deana Carter, Chris Farren

Deana Carter singles chronology
"You Still Shake Me" (1999)	"Angels Working Overtime" (1999)	"Ruby Brown" (1999)

Music video
- "Angels Working Overtime on YouTube

"Angels Working Overtime" is a song written by Michael Dulaney and Michael Lunn, and recorded by American country music artist Deana Carter. It was released in April 1999 as the third single from the album Everything's Gonna Be Alright. "Angels Working Overtime" was Carter's eighth Top 40 hit, with a peak position at number 35 on the Billboard Hot Country Singles & Tracks. It was less successful on the Canadian RPM Country Tracks, where it peaked at number 55.

== Content ==
The song is a mid-tempo with a simple production featuring percussion and mixed acoustic and electric guitar instrumentation. It describes the journey of a girl from being abandoned by her parents at birth to her ending up happy where she belongs, thanks to "angels working overtime."

The album version features a lengthy instrumental intro, bridge and outro for the song, along with a children's choir during the song's third chorus and backing noise of children playing. The radio edit shortens the intro and outro, and cuts the chorus performed by the children alone. Although, it retains some of the children's noise and their backing vocals on the final chorus.

== Critical reception ==
Billboard spoke favorably of the song, which they expected as a "rebound" for Carter's early chart success. "It's a solid number, and Carter's performance exudes that sweet ethereal quality that is consistently appealing. The production is effective, except for some sound effects that are more annoyingly distracting than complementary. All in all, it's one of those records with a "triumph over adversity" theme that should find a wide audience."

== Music video ==
A music video was released for the song in April 1999, directed by Luke Scott. The video follows the lyrics in the song, beginning with a couple in a diner who leave their newborn baby behind with a locket and a note. The girl grows up in a prairie town, and feeling out of place, boards a Greyhound when she turns eighteen. She ends up in Santa Fe, and tags along with a boy to "LA", whom she has a moment of passion with in a motel room. Carter is shown throughout the various stages of the girl's life; she is seen examining the locket, sitting in the front seat of the parents' car, and leaning against the front of the bus. Carter represents the angels that have been watching over her.

== Chart performance ==
"Angels Working Overtime" spent a total of 16 weeks on the Billboard Hot Country Singles & Tracks chart, and reached a peak position of number 35 for the week of June 12, 1999.

Chart (1999)	Peak position
Canada Country Singles (RPM)	55
US Hot Country Songs (Billboard)	35
