= Everything's Gonna Be Alright (album) =

Studio album by Deana Carter
- Released: October 20, 1998
- Genre: Country
- Length: 53:49
- Label: Capitol Nashville
- Producers: Deana Carter; Chris Farren; Keith Thomas

Deana Carter chronology
Did I Shave My Legs for This? (1995)	Everything's Gonna Be Alright (1998)	Father Christmas (2001)

Singles from Everything's Gonna Be Alright
- 1. "Absence of the Heart" Released: September 14, 1998; 2. "You Still Shake Me" Released: January 11, 1999; 3. "Angels Working Overtime" Released: March 22, 1999; 4. "Ruby Brown" Released: 1999

Professional ratings
Review scores
Source	Rating
AllMusic	4/5 stars
Entertainment Weekly	B+
Los Angeles Times	2.5/4 stars

Everything's Gonna Be Alright is the second studio album by American country music artist Deana Carter. Released in 1998 as her second and final studio album for Capitol Records Nashville, it features the single "Absence of the Heart", a number 16 hit on the Billboard Hot Country Singles & Tracks (now Hot Country Songs) charts in late 1998. "You Still Shake Me" and "Angels Working Overtime" were released as the second and third singles, and peaked at numbers 36 and 35, respectively. "Ruby Brown" failed to chart in the U.S., but managed to reach number 74 on the country charts in Canada.

== Content ==
The title track to this album was written by Carter's father, Fred Carter, Jr. Also included is a cover of Melanie Safka's 1971 hit "Brand New Key". "Colour Everywhere" also appeared on the compilation Touched by an Angel: The Album.

== Track listing ==
No.	Title	Writer(s)	Length
1.	"You Still Shake Me"	Leslie Satcher; Tim Ryan Rouillier	2:48
2.	"Ruby Brown"	Matraca Berg; Tim Krekel	4:19
3.	"Absence of the Heart"	Deana Carter; Chris Farren; Chuck Jones	3:29
4.	"Brand New Key"	Melanie	3:17
5.	"Michelangelo Sky"	Carter; Farren; Jones	3:53
6.	"People Miss Planes"	Liz Hengber; Deanna Bryant	3:26
7.	"Never Comin' Down"	Carter; Farren; Jones	5:30
8.	"Make Up Your Mind"	Chris Lindsey; Aimee Mayo	4:36
9.	"Colour Everywhere"	Guy Roche; Shelly Peiken	4:15
10.	"Angels Working Overtime"	Michael Dulaney; Michael Lunn	5:22
11.	"Dickson County"	Berg; Carter	3:35
12.	"The Train Song" (featuring Lynyrd Skynyrd)	Carter; Farren; Jones	4:01
13.	"Everything's Gonna Be Alright"	Fred Carter Jr.	5:18
Total length:			53:49

== Personnel ==
=== Musicians ===
- Shawn Allan – drum programming
- Matraca Berg – backing vocals on "Ruby Brown", "Dickson County"
- Deana Carter – lead vocals, mandolin (on "You Still Shake Me"), backing vocals (all tracks except "Color Everywhere")
- Joe Chemay – bass guitar
- Dan Dugmore – steel guitar
- Chris Farren – mandolin, drum programming, backing vocals (on "You Still Shake Me", "Absence of the Heart", "Michelangelo Sky", "Never Comin' Down", "Make Up Your Mind", "Angels Working Overtime", "Dickson County", "The Train Song")
- Larry Franklin – fiddle
- John Hobbs – piano, organ
- Ron Huff – string arrangements and conductor on "Absence of the Heart" and People Miss Planes"
- Chuck Jones – backing vocals ("Absence of the Heart", "Never Comin' Down")
- G. Labeaud – backing vocals on "Colour Everywhere"
- Steve Marcantonio – backing vocals on "Brand New Key"
- Ricky Medlocke – backing vocals on "The Train Song"
- Greg Morrow – drums, percussion
- Steve Nathan – keyboards
- Tom Roady – percussion
- Gary Rossington – backing vocals and guitar solo on "The Train Song"
- Brent Rowan – electric guitar
- Darrell Scott – acoustic guitar on "Brand New Key"
- Hughie Thomasson – backing vocals and guitar solo on "The Train Song"
- Biff Watson – acoustic guitar
- Johnny Van Zant – backing vocals on "The Train Song"
- Michael Rhodes - bass (track 9)
- Children's choir ("Kid Connection") on "Angels Working Overtime" and "Everything's Gonna Be Alright": Janet McMahan, Kyle Reeves, Lauren Smith, Kelsy Morgenthaler, Jordan Dockery, Megan Dockery, Rachel Howell, Brittany Hargest, Matthew White
- String section on "Absence of the Heart" and "People Miss Planes":
  - Violin: Carl Gorodetzky, Pam Sixfin, Conni Ellisor, David Davidson, David Angell, Mary Kathryn VanOsdale, Lee Larrison, Alan Umstead
  - Cello: Bob Mason, Anthony LaMarchina, John Catchings, Julia Tanner

=== Technical ===
- Deana Carter – production (all tracks)
- Don Cobb – editing
- Chris Farren – production (all tracks except "Colour Everywhere")
- Kelly Giedt – production coordinator
- Tom Harding – additional engineering
- Thomas Johnson – assistant engineer
- Steve Marcantonio – engineering
- Denny Purcell – mastering
- Keith Thomas – production on "Colour Everywhere"
- Tim Waters – assistant engineer

== Charts ==
=== Weekly charts ===
Chart (1998)	Peak position
Canadian Country Albums (RPM)	11
US Billboard 200	57
US Top Country Albums (Billboard)	6

=== Year-end charts ===
Chart (1999)	Position
US Top Country Albums (Billboard)	36
