= Here for the Party (song) =

2004 single by Gretchen Wilson

Single by Gretchen Wilson

from the album Here for the Party
- B-side: "Redneck Woman"
- Released: July 1, 2004
- Genre: Country rock
- Length: 3:18
- Label: Epic
- Songwriters: Big Kenny; John Rich; Gretchen Wilson
- Producers: Joe Scaife; Mark Wright

Gretchen Wilson singles chronology
"Redneck Woman" (2004)	"Here for the Party" (2004)	"When I Think About Cheatin'" (2004)

"Here for the Party" is a song co-written and recorded by American country music artist Gretchen Wilson. It was released in July 2004 as the second single and title track from her album Here for the Party. The song became Wilson's second chart entry on the US Billboard Hot Country Singles & Tracks chart. It has been certified gold by the Recording Industry Association of America (RIAA). Wilson wrote this song with Big Kenny and John Rich, who comprise Big & Rich.

== Music video ==
A music video for "Here for the Party" was released for the song, directed by Deaton Flanigen and Gary Halverson, and filmed live in concert in Las Vegas, and during CMA Fest in Nashville.

== Charts ==
Chart (2004)	Peak position
Canada Country (Radio & Records)	2
US Billboard Hot 100	29
US Hot Country Songs (Billboard)	3

=== Year-end charts ===
Chart (2004)	Position
US Hot Country Singles & Tracks (Billboard)	29
