= Did I Shave My Legs for This? (song) =

- CD single cover

Single by Deana Carter

from the album Did I Shave My Legs for This?
- Released: October 27, 1997
- Genre: Country; comedy
- Length: 3:11
- Label: Capitol Nashville
- Songwriters: Deana Carter; Rhonda Hart
- Producer: Chris Farren

Deana Carter singles chronology
"How Do I Get There" (1997)	"Did I Shave My Legs for This?" (1997)	"Absence of the Heart" (1998)

"Did I Shave My Legs for This?" is a song by American country music artist Deana Carter, recorded as the title track for her debut studio album Did I Shave My Legs for This? (1995). Carter co-wrote the single with Rhonda Hart while Chris Farren produced it. It was released by Capitol Nashville on October 27, 1997, as the seventh and final single from the album.

The song peaked at number 25 on the US Hot Country Songs chart.

== Content ==
The song is a lament from the point of view of a woman who lives in a mobile home with her husband. The couple had a romantic night planned, and the woman prepared by going to a beauty salon, buying a new dress and shoes, and shaving her legs, but when she arrives home, expecting "flowers and wine" from her husband, she is disappointed to see that he is interested only in watching television and drinking beer.

== Charts ==
=== Weekly charts ===
Chart (1997–1998)	Peak position
Canada Country Singles (RPM)	36
US Billboard Hot 100	85
US Hot Country Songs (Billboard)	25

== Awards and nominations ==
The song was nominated for both Best Country Song and Best Female Country Vocal Performance at the 1998 Grammy Awards.

== Covers and parodies ==
The song was parodied by country music parodist Cledus T. Judd as "Did I Shave My Back for This?", from his 1998 album of the same name. Carter appears briefly in the music video for the song.
