= Did I Shave My Legs for This? =

- US cover

Studio album by Deana Carter
- Released: February 27, 1995 (UK); September 3, 1996 (US)
- Recorded: 1995
- Studios: Emerald Sound (Nashville, Tennessee)
- Genre: Country
- Length: 41:19
- Label: Capitol Nashville
- Producers: Chris Farren, Jimmy Bowen, John Guess

Deana Carter chronology
Did I Shave My Legs for This? (1995)	Everything's Gonna Be Alright (1998)

Alternative cover
- UK cover

Singles from Did I Shave My Legs for This? (original release)
- 1. "Angel Without a Prayer" Released: January 30, 1995; 2. "Are You Coming Home Today?" Released: April 17, 1995

Singles from Did I Shave My Legs for This? (Re-release)
- 1. "Strawberry Wine" Released: August 5, 1996; 2. "We Danced Anyway" Released: December 9, 1996; 3. "Count Me In" Released: March 1997; 4. "How Do I Get There" Released: July 1997; 5. "Did I Shave My Legs for This?" Released: October 27, 1997

Professional ratings
Review scores
Source	Rating
Allmusic	4.5/5 stars
Christgau's Consumer Guide	(2-star Honorable Mention)
Entertainment Weekly	B
Pittsburgh Post-Gazette	3/4 stars
The Province	4/5

Did I Shave My Legs for This? is the debut studio album by American country music artist Deana Carter, released via Patriot Records in the United Kingdom on February 27, 1995. Two singles were released from the album in the UK, "Angel Without a Prayer" and "Are You Coming Home Today?", which charted at numbers 100 and 93 respectively on the UK Singles Chart.

In 1996, Capitol Records had Carter record new material for the North American release of the album, which retained only three songs from the original release. This version features her breakthrough debut single "Strawberry Wine", a number-one hit on the Billboard Hot Country Singles & Tracks chart at the end of that year. "We Danced Anyway", "Count Me In", and the title track were also released as a singles. Of these, "We Danced Anyway" and the promotional single "How Do I Get There" also reached number one.

In honor of the 25th anniversary of the album, a remastered edition was released on November 5, 2021. The re-issue includes re-recordings of the title-track and "Strawberry Wine", featuring guest appearances from Lauren Alaina, Ashley McBryde, Vince Gill, Terri Clark, Sara Evans and Martina McBride.

== Track listing ==
=== Original UK edition ===
Did I Shave My Legs for This? original track listing
No.	Title	Writer(s)	Length
1.	"Angel Without a Prayer"	Deana Carter; Michael Dan Ehmig; Micheal Smotherman	5:15
2.	"Rita Valentine"	Carter	3:24
3.	"I've Loved Enough to Know"	Carter; Chuck Jones	3:22
4.	"I Can't Shake You"	Dean Dillon; Carter	3:16
5.	"Are You Coming Home Today?"	Carter	3:59
6.	"Did I Shave My Legs for This?"	Carter; Rhonda Hart	3:11
7.	"Turn Those Wheels Around"	Carter; Jones	3:15
8.	"Graffiti Bridge"	Carter; Bob DiPiero	3:38
9.	"Before We Ever Heard Goodbye"	Carter; Jones	3:46
10.	"We Share a Wall"	Carter; Trey Bruce	3:21
11.	"Don't Let Go"	Carter	2:26
12.	"Just What You Need"	Carter	3:22

=== Revised US edition ===
Did I Shave My Legs for This? revised track listing
No.	Title	Writer(s)	Length
1.	"I've Loved Enough to Know"	Deana Carter; Chuck Jones	3:22
2.	"We Danced Anyway"	Matraca Berg; Randy Scruggs	3:23
3.	"Count Me In"	Carter; Jones	3:24
4.	"If This Is Love"	Al Anderson; Craig Wiseman	2:53
5.	"Love Ain't Worth Making"	Carter; Scott Poston	3:44
6.	"Before We Ever Heard Goodbye"	Carter; Jones	3:45
7.	"How Do I Get There"	Carter; Chris Farren	4:09
8.	"Strawberry Wine"	Berg; Gary Harrison	4:51
9.	"That's How You Know It's Love"	Stephony Smith	4:27
10.	"Did I Shave My Legs for This?"	Carter; Rhonda Hart	3:11
11.	"To the Other Side"	Kim Carnes; Greg Barnhill	4:10

25th anniversary edition bonus tracks
No.	Title	Writer(s)	Length
12.	"Strawberry Wine" (2021 version feat. Lauren Alaina, Martina McBride, Ashley McBryde, Kylie Morgan & Vince Gill)	Berg; Harrison	5:19
13.	"Did I Shave My Legs for This?" (2021 version feat. Terri Clark, Sara Evans, Ashley McBryde & Vince Gill)	Carter; Jones	3:07

25th anniversary edition bonus disc
No.	Title	Writer(s)	Length
1.	"Angel Without a Prayer"	Carter; Ehmig; Smotherman	5:15
2.	"Rita Valentine"	Carter	3:24
3.	"I Can't Shake You"	Dillon; Carter	3:16
4.	"Are You Coming Home Today?"	Carter	3:59
5.	"Turn Those Wheels Around"	Carter; Jones	3:15
6.	"Graffiti Bridge"	Carter; DiPiero	3:38
7.	"We Share a Wall"	Carter; Bruce	3:21
8.	"Don't Let Go"	Carter	2:26
9.	"Just What You Need"	Carter	3:22
10.	"Did I Shave My Legs for This?" (alternate version)	Carter; Hart	3:11

== Chart performance ==
Did I Shave My Legs for This? is Carter's highest-charting album to date and her only album to chart in the top ten on the U.S. Billboard 200.

=== Weekly charts ===
Chart (1996–1997)	Peak position
Canadian Albums (RPM)	25
Canadian Country Albums (RPM)	1
US Billboard 200	10
US Top Country Albums (Billboard)	2

=== Year-end charts ===
Chart (1996)	Position
US Top Country Albums (Billboard)	39
Chart (1997)	Position
US Billboard 200	14
US Top Country Albums (Billboard)	2
Chart (1998)	Position
US Top Country Albums (Billboard)	21

== Certifications ==
Region	Certification	Certified units/sales
United States (RIAA)	5× Platinum	5,000,000^{^}
^{^} Shipments figures based on certification alone.

== Personnel ==
Adapted from Did I Shave My Legs for This? liner notes.

Musicians

- Deana Carter - vocals
- Joe Chemay - bass guitar (except tracks 1, 5, 6)
- Chris DiCroce - background vocals
- Dan Dugmore - acoustic guitar, steel guitar
- Chris Farren - acoustic guitar, background vocals
- Larry Franklin - fiddle, mandolin
- John Hobbs - keyboards, piano
- Dann Huff - electric guitar (tracks 1, 5, 6)
- Chuck Jones - acoustic guitar (tracks 1, 5, 6)
- Greg Morrow - drums (except tracks 1, 5, 6), percussion
- Steve Nathan - Hammond organ
- Brent Rowan - electric guitar
- Gary Park - acoustic guitar, electric guitar
- Pete Wasner - piano (tracks 1, 5, 6)
- Biff Watson - acoustic guitar
- Lonnie Wilson - drums (tracks 1, 5, 6)
- Glenn Worf - bass guitar (tracks 1, 5, 6)

Strings performed by the Nashville String Machine, arranged by David Campbell, and conducted by Carl Gorodetzky

Technical

- Jimmy Bowen - producer (tracks 1, 5, 6 only)
- Derek Bason - recording assistant, mixing assistant (tracks 1, 5, 6 only)
- Chris Farren - producer (all tracks)
- John Guess - producer (tracks 1, 5, 6 only)
- Tom Harding - additional recording
- Steve Marcantonio - recording, mixing (except tracks 1, 5, 6)
- Denny Purcell - mastering
- Tim Waters - recording assistant, mixing assistant
- Marty Williams - recording (tracks 1, 5, 6 only)
