= We Danced Anyway =

Single by Deana Carter

from the album Did I Shave My Legs for This?
- B-side: "Rita Valentine"
- Released: December 9, 1996
- Recorded: Spring 1996
- Genre: Country
- Length: 3:40
- Label: Capitol Nashville
- Songwriters: Randy Scruggs; Matraca Berg
- Producer: Chris Farren

Deana Carter singles chronology
"Strawberry Wine" (1996)	"We Danced Anyway" (1996)	"Count Me In" (1997)

Music video
- "We Danced Anyway" on YouTube

"We Danced Anyway" is a song written by Randy Scruggs and Matraca Berg, and recorded by American country music artist Deana Carter that reached the top of the Billboard Hot Country Singles & Tracks chart. It was released in December 1996 as the second single and second Number One hit from her debut album Did I Shave My Legs for This?. The song spent 2 weeks at the top of the Hot Country Singles & Tracks chart, and six non-consecutive weeks at the top of Canada's RPM Country Tracks. It was also the RPM chart number-one single of the year in 1997.

== Content ==
In the lyrics, the singer recounts happy memories of dancing in a "happy little foreign town" with a lover, and invites her lover to dance again.

Kevin John Coyne of Country Universe rated the song "A", stating in his review that "The production is bright and airy, with no unnecessary flourishes getting in the way of the lyric and Carter’s typically understated delivery of it."

== Music video ==
The music video for "We Danced Anyway" was shot in Puerto Rico, and directed by Roger Pistole. Scenes of Carter dancing joyfully on a city street are mixed with scenes of her on a tropical beach. She is seen by herself, but also with her lover as well, and scenes of native islanders are shown as well.

== Chart performance ==
"We Danced Anyway" debuted at number 58 on the U.S. Billboard Hot Country Singles & Tracks for the chart week of December 14, 1996. The song peaked at Number One on the chart in March 1997 becoming Carter's second number one hit overall.

Chart (1996–1997)	Peak position
Canada Country Singles (RPM)	1
US Billboard Hot 100	72
US Hot Country Songs (Billboard)	1

=== Year-end charts ===
Chart (1997)	Position
Canada Country Tracks (RPM)	1
US Country Songs (Billboard)	21
