= Strawberry Wine (Deana Carter song) =

Single by Deana Carter

from the album Did I Shave My Legs for This?
- B-side: "Before We Ever Heard Goodbye"
- Released: July 26, 1996
- Recorded: 1995
- Genre: Country
- Length: 4:51
- Label: Capitol Nashville
- Songwriters: Matraca Berg; Gary Harrison
- Producer: Chris Farren

Deana Carter singles chronology
"Strawberry Wine" (1996)	"We Danced Anyway" (1996)

"Strawberry Wine" is a song written by Matraca Berg and Gary Harrison, and recorded by American country music artist Deana Carter. It was released on July 26, 1996 as Carter's debut single and the first from her debut album, Did I Shave My Legs for This? The song became a number 1 hit on both the US Billboard Hot Country Singles & Tracks (now Hot Country Songs) chart and the Canadian RPM Country Tracks.

"Strawberry Wine" is Carter's most successful single overall, and is considered a signature song both for her and for songwriter Matraca Berg.

== Content ==
"Strawberry Wine" is a sentimental ballad, backed primarily with steel guitar and percussion. As the narrator remembers a summer spent on her grandparents' farm, she nostalgically recalls herself as being naïve and youthful in pursuit of love. She compares her first love to strawberry wine, considered to be sweet and intoxicating, but ultimately bittersweet in aftertaste. As she grows older, she returns to the farm to find that everything has changed. Carter originally performed this song in the key of D-flat major with a vocal range of A♭_{3} to D♭_{5}. It has a 6/8 time signature and the main chord pattern is D♭-G♭-D♭-A♭-D♭.

The lyrics were inspired by Berg's own coming of age as a teenager outside of Luck, Wisconsin. She recalled, "We used to go to my grandparents' dairy farm in the summer. My aunt, who's six months younger than me, and I would try to score some wine. And I met this boy..." The title refers to Boone's Farm Strawberry Hill, a wine cooler popular with teenagers at the time.

== Composition and recording ==
Berg and Harrison wrote the song in less than four hours. Berg originally intended to record the song herself, but after being dropped by her record label, she shopped the song to other singers; multiple artists, including Trisha Yearwood, passed on it. Berg shopped the song to record labels around Nashville, but labels considered it overly long, controversial due to its reference to a teenage girl losing her virginity, and "not catchy enough."

Carter heard the song when she was the only artist to attend a showcase by Berg's publisher, Pat Higdon. Although she was nervous performing the song, Berg had no other new material to perform instead. Carter acquired the song and recorded it for the US version of her debut album, Did I Shave My Legs for This?, which had been delayed at the same time that "Strawberry Wine" was being turned down by other singers. Berg said of the situation, "I am so happy Deana recorded that song. ... I was sad to let the song go, but she's just the coolest girl."

== Critical reception ==
"Strawberry Wine" won Song of the Year at the Country Music Association Awards in 1997 and was voted Song of the Year by the Nashville Songwriters Association International and the Nashville Music Awards. That year, the song was also nominated for three additional awards; Grammy Award for Best Country Song, Academy of Country Music Awards Best Country Song nominee, and Country Music Radio Awards for Song of The Year.

In 2024, Rolling Stone ranked the song at #141 on its 200 Greatest Country Songs of All Time ranking.

== Commercial performance ==
"Strawberry Wine" debuted at number 70 on the U.S. Billboard Hot Country Singles & Tracks for the chart week of August 17, 1996. The song reached Number One on the chart in November 1996, holding the position for two weeks. The song has sold 870,000 digital copies in the US as of October 2015.

== Music video ==
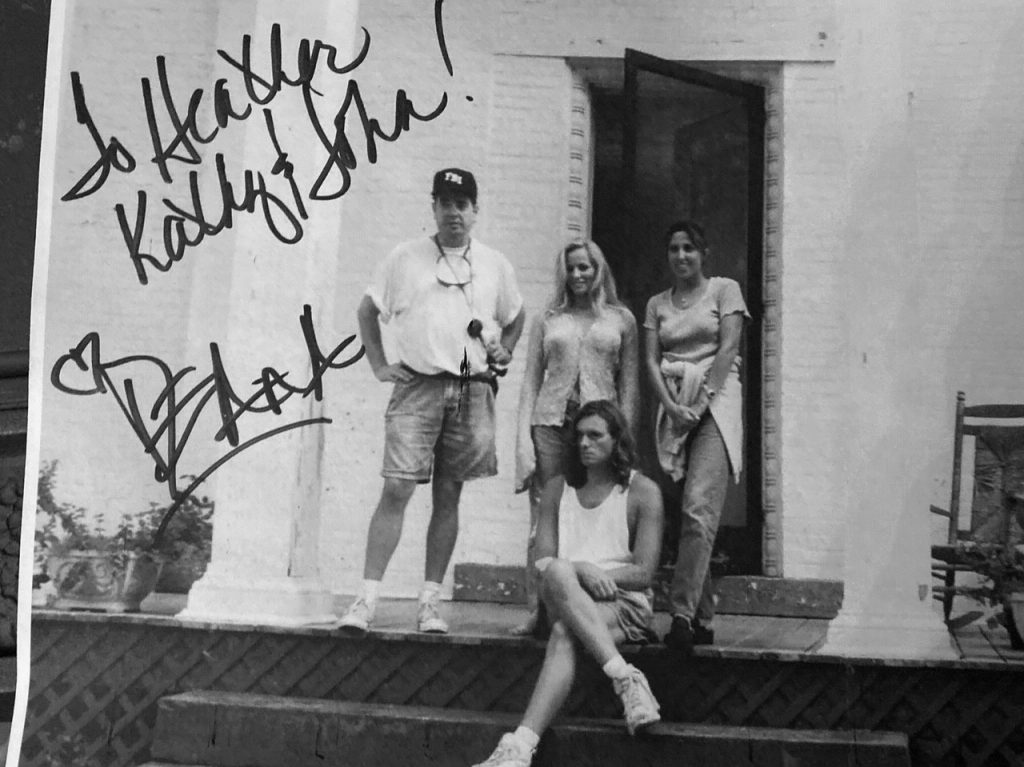
Autographed Photo of Deanna Carter at Old Oaks Farm from the filming of the music video Strawberry Wine

The music video for "Strawberry Wine" was directed by Roger Pistole and filmed at Old Oaks Farm. The location was discovered by location scout Chris Farren, who recalled being driven through Guthrie, Kentucky by his parents as a child along U.S. Route 41, the Dixie-Beeline Highway. Farren approached the farm's then-owners, John and Kathy Hansen, unannounced to request to film on site of the historic mansion and farm. A few days later, the film crew and Deana Carter arrived on site at the farm to film. Filming was difficult as the weather was inclement, raining during many of the takes, causing the storyline to be drastically altered and the film shots to be edited substantially with filters. The entire video is shot at Old Oaks Farm and within less than a one-mile vicinity of the farm.

In the music video, scenes vary between Carter singing in the present day and flashbacks featuring the song's narrator, her love interest, and her grandparents. Carter is seen in several rooms throughout the Old Oaks mansion, in the adjacent fields in front of a nearby hay storage barn located west of the mansion, and in the front yard rope swing. The young couple are first seen resting on the porch of the mansion, in a nearby tree swing, driving down a rural country road (actually the adjacent Fairgrounds Road) in a 1971 rally sport Chevrolet Camaro, and sitting on the railroad tracks at a CSX Railroad train yard, located one mile south of Old Oaks Farm. The narrator's grandparents are shown sitting on the mansion's porch, running through the gardens of the Old Oaks mansion while holding hands, and in the soybean fields surrounding the mansion.

The song's bridge depicts the narrator imagining herself returning to the farm in her middle-aged years while at the rope swing and on the rural road. Thereafter she imagines a requited love in which the she and her former love interest are together. This middle-aged couple is seen in vignettes throughout the farm, including standing in front of the farm's hay storage barns and adjacent to the mansion's garden fence.

Old Oaks Farm is also the setting of the poem "True Love" by Robert Penn Warren. As of 2023, the mansion is open to the public as a venue for weddings and other events.

== Charts ==
Chart (1996)	Peak position
Canada Country Singles (RPM)	1
US Billboard Hot 100	65
US Hot Country Songs (Billboard)	1

=== Year-end charts ===
Chart (1996)	Position
Canada Country Tracks (RPM)	35

== Certifications ==
Region	Certification	Certified units/sales
United States (RIAA)	2× Platinum	2,000,000^{‡}
^{‡} Sales+streaming figures based on certification alone.
