= Deana Carter =

American country singer-songwriter (born 1966)

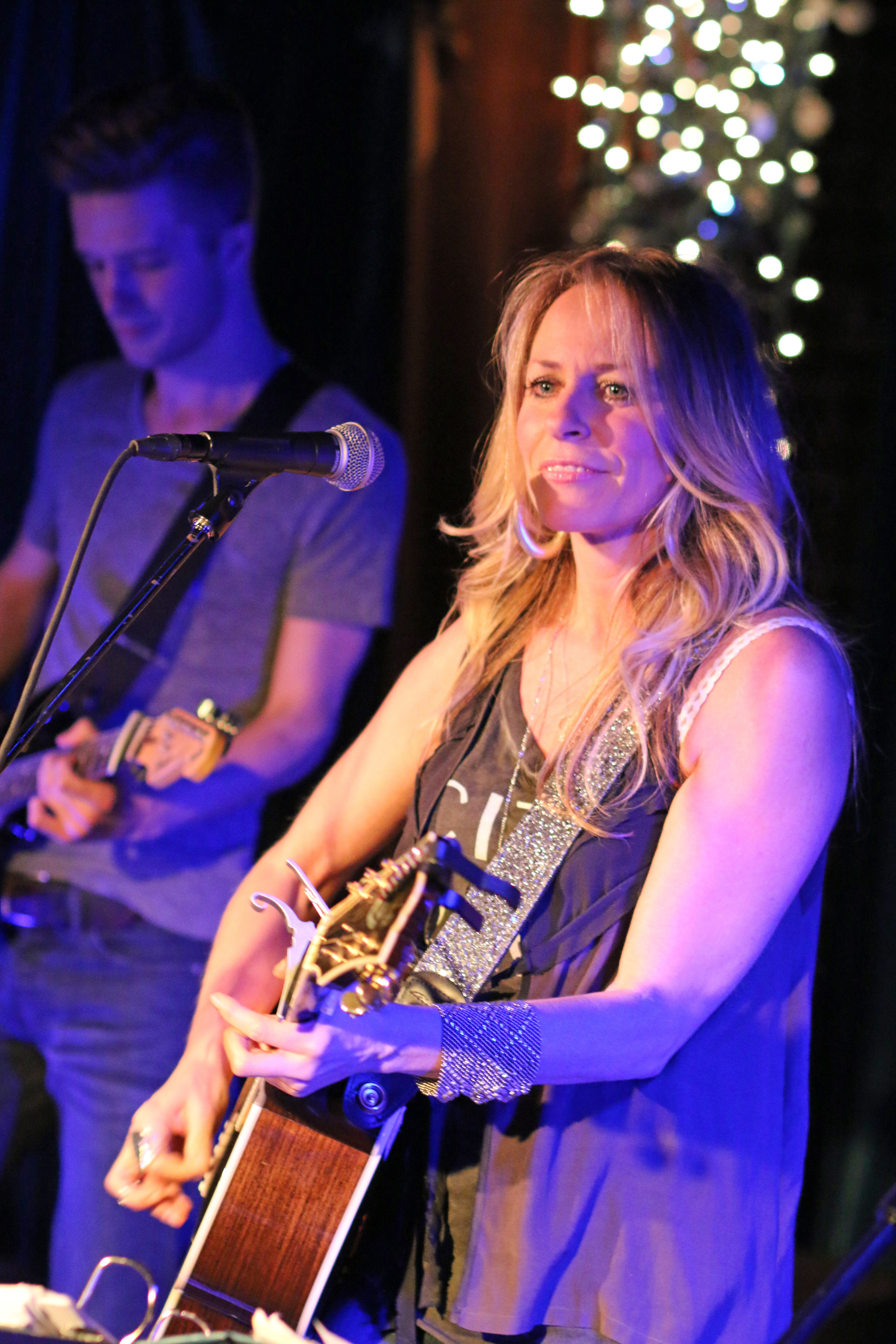
- Carter in 2014

Background information
- Born: Deana Kay Carter; January 4, 1966 (age 60); Forrest City Arkansas
- Genre: Country
- Occupations: Singer-songwriter, author
- Instruments: Vocals, guitar
- Years active: 1994–present
- Labels: Capitol Nashville; Rounder; Arista Nashville; Vanguard; Warner Bros. Nashville/Chappel Music
- Spouses: Christopher DiCroce (m. 1995, divorced) Brandon Malone (m. 2009; div. 2012) Jim McPhail (m. 2018)
- Website: deana.com

Deana Kay Carter (born January 4, 1966) is an American country music singer-songwriter who broke through in 1996 with the release of her debut album Did I Shave My Legs for This?, which was certified 5× Multi-Platinum in the United States for sales of over 5 million. It was followed by 1998's Everything's Gonna Be Alright, 2003's I'm Just a Girl, 2005's The Story of My Life, and 2007's The Chain. Overall, Carter's albums have accounted for 14 singles, including three which reached Number One on the Billboard country charts: "Strawberry Wine", "We Danced Anyway", and "How Do I Get There".

== Biography ==
Carter was born in Nashville, Tennessee, the daughter of singer Fred Carter, Jr. Despite her famous father, she did not have a smooth path to a recording deal. After an initial lack of success at age 17, she entered the University of Tennessee, majoring in rehabilitation therapy and becoming a member of Alpha Delta Pi sorority. During college, she sang at various campus locations, performing for the enjoyment of singing, rather than with the intent of pursuing a musical career. She was also a local bartender at the Back Door Tavern (BDT) on Kingston Pike. After she graduated, she worked with recovering stroke and head injury patients. Although she found the work rewarding and worthwhile, she eventually realized that her first love was music, and decided to pursue the music career she had left.

Carter dated music video director Chris Hicky and had a son during their relationship; Gray Hayes Hicky was born in September 2004. On October 3, 2009, Carter married boyfriend Brandon Malone in Malibu. In November 2012, Carter filed for legal separation from Malone, citing irreconcilable differences. On July 6, 2018, Carter married Jim McPhail in a ceremony at the Pearl Hotel in Rosemary Beach, Fla.

Carter has been a national spokeswoman for the National Kidney Foundation; her late father was a kidney transplant recipient. Carter also was the author of a book, Songs From the Heart.

=== Breakthrough success: Did I Shave My Legs for This? ===
Carter's first big break came when one of her demo tapes caught the attention of Willie Nelson, who invited her to take part in the 1994 Farm Aid VII concert as the show's only female soloist. That same tape led to a contract with Capitol Records that year.

In early 1995, she released her debut album, Did I Shave My Legs for This?, in the UK on Patriot Records. However, the label folded shortly after the album's release. In 1996, Carter released her debut country single, "Strawberry Wine", which reached No. 1 on the U.S. Billboard Hot Country Singles & Tracks. Did I Shave My Legs for This? was released in North America (keeping only three of the original tracks) to great success. The album debuted at No. 2 on the U.S. Top Country Albums chart and sold well over 5 million copies, and produced two further No. 1 hits in "We Danced Anyway" and "How Do I Get There".

Carter was featured on the soundtrack to the 1997 animated film Anastasia for her rendition of "Once Upon a December". The track was made into a music video and received rotation on CMT at the time "How Do I Get There" was charting as a radio single (since the single had no music video).

Also in 1997, she was nominated for Top New Female Vocalist at the Academy of Country Music Awards, along with Mindy McCready and LeAnn Rimes, but lost to Rimes.

=== Second album and departure from Capitol: Everything's Gonna Be Alright ===
In September 1998, Carter released her sixth single, "Absence of the Heart," as the lead-off single to her second album, Everything's Gonna Be Alright, which was released on October 20, 1998. The album peaked at No. 6 and sold just enough to receive a Gold certification, far less than the sales of her debut album. The album produced a Top 20 in its lead single and three further singles, two of which were minor Top 40 hits ("You Still Shake Me" and "Angels Working Overtime").

After her second album failed to follow up on the success of her debut, she attempted for several years to get new material out. But after dealing with a total of four label presidents and a failed attempt to push out a third album in 2001, she chose to end her relationship with Capitol Records over differences on creative direction.

=== Return to the studio: Father Christmas and I'm Just a Girl ===
After releasing her third studio album, Father Christmas, on Rounder Records in November 2001, and a divorce from husband Chris DiCroce, she relocated to Los Angeles.

In 2002, Carter signed with Arista Nashville and released her first single in three years. "There's No Limit," which became her sixth Top 20 hit with a peak of No. 14 in early 2003, served as the lead-off single to her fourth studio album, I'm Just a Girl, which was released on March 18, 2003. The title track was released as the album's second single, and was a minor Top 40 hit. No further singles were released from the album, and Carter once again parted ways with her record label.

=== Turning to independent labels: The Story of My Life and The Chain ===
In 2004, Carter signed with independent record label Vanguard Records. She released the song "(Bleep) Texas" in March 2005, but it failed to chart and was shortly replaced with "One Day at a Time," which served as the lead single to her fifth studio album, The Story of My Life. It only remained on the chart for five weeks and peaked at No. 55. The Story of My Life peaked at No. 26 on the U.S. Country Albums chart, and all further singles ("The Girl You Left Me For," "Sunny Day," and "In a Heartbeat") failed to chart. Despite having less success, Carter had more artistic freedom with this album and was able to write (or co-write) and produce all 11 tracks.

Live in Concert, Carter's first live album, was released in early 2007 through Big Band Concert Series. The album includes one previously unreleased song, "Angels of the Heart," as well as other concert favorites. Although released in 2007, all of the live performances on the album were recorded in 1998.

Carter's sixth studio album, The Chain, was released on October 9, 2007. The Chain was a cover album, that she recorded as a tribute to her father (who performed guitar on many of the original versions of the covers found on the album). Many of the tracks also featured the original artists as duet partners, such as Dolly Parton (on "Love Is Like a Butterfly") and Willie Nelson (on "On the Road Again"). The album was unsuccessful; it debuted and peaked at No. 60, and its only single (the duet version of "On the Road Again" with Nelson) failed to chart.

Carter was ranked No. 81 on the 100 Greatest Women (of Country Music) by Country Universe in 2008.

=== Return to music and career today: Southern Way of Life ===
After releasing The Chain, Carter took some time off from recording music to spend at home with her son.

In an interview with Jay Cooper of Slither Productions, Carter reported that she had been writing music for her next album, with hopes of releasing the record sometime in 2010. It was announced in March 2010 that Deana Carter had signed a record deal with Warner Bros. Nashville/Chappel Music.

In 2010, Kenny Chesney covered "You and Tequila," a song co-written by Carter with Matraca Berg for the album I'm Just a Girl, and included it on his album Hemingway's Whiskey. Chesney's version was later released as the album's fourth single in May 2011 and features guest vocals from Grace Potter. It peaked at number 3 in September 2011, and was nominated for Song of the Year at the 2011 CMA Awards.

Deana Carter's third studio and holiday album, Father Christmas, was re-released on December 13, 2011, via Adamant Records, ten years after its initial release.

In 2013, Carter formed her own record label, Little Nugget Records. Southern Way of Life, Carter's seventh studio album, released on December 2, 2013. In 2013, Carter re-released Father Christmas with her own record label, Little Nugget Records.

== Discography ==
- 1996: Did I Shave My Legs for This?
- 1998: Everything's Gonna Be Alright
- 2001: Father Christmas
- 2003: I'm Just a Girl
- 2005: The Story of My Life
- 2007: The Chain
- 2013: Southern Way of Life

== Awards and nominations ==
=== Grammy Awards ===
Year	Nominee / work	Award	Result
1997	"Strawberry Wine"	Best Female Country Vocal Performance	Nominated
1998	"Did I Shave My Legs for This?"	Best Female Country Vocal Performance	Nominated
2012	"You and Tequila"^{[A]}	Best Country Song	Nominated

=== TNN/Music City News Country Awards ===
Year	Nominee / work	Award	Result
1997	Deana Carter	Female Star of Tomorrow	Nominated
1998	Deana Carter	Female Star of Tomorrow	Nominated

=== Academy of Country Music Awards ===
Year	Nominee / work	Award	Result
1997	Deana Carter	Top New Female Vocalist	Nominated
1997	"Strawberry Wine"	Song of the Year^{[B]}	Nominated
1997	"Strawberry Wine"	Single Record of the Year	Nominated
1998	Deana Carter	Top Female Vocalist of the Year	Nominated
1998	"Did I Shave My Legs for This"	Video of the Year	Nominated
2012	"You and Tequila"^{[C]}	Song of the Year	Nominated

=== Country Music Association Awards ===
Year	Nominee / work	Award	Result
1997	Deana Carter	Horizon Award	Nominated
1997	Deana Carter	Female Vocalist of the Year	Nominated
1997	Did I Shave My Legs for This?	Album of the Year	Nominated
1997	"Strawberry Wine"	Single of the Year	Won
1997	"Strawberry Wine"	Video of the Year	Nominated
1998	"Did I Shave My Legs for This"	Video of the Year	Nominated
2012	"You and Tequila"^{[A]}	Song of the Year	Nominated

^[A]Nominated alongside co-writer Matraca Berg
^[B]Nominated alongside songwriters Matraca Berg and Gary Harrison
^[C]Nominated alongside co-writer Matraca Berg, along with Kenny Chesney and Grace Potter
