= I Want You So Bad =

- Japanese Single sleeve

Single by Heart

from the album Bad Animals
- B-side: "Easy Target"
- Released: February 1988
- Genre: Soft rock, synthrock
- Length: 4:19; 5:20 (extended version)
- Label: Capitol
- Songwriters: Tom Kelly; Billy Steinberg
- Producer: Ron Nevison

Heart singles chronology
"There's the Girl" (1987)	"I Want You So Bad" (1988)	"All I Wanna Do Is Make Love to You" (1990)

"I Want You So Bad" is a song recorded by American rock band Heart. It was composed by Tom Kelly and Billy Steinberg, who were responsible for writing Heart's U.S. number-one single "Alone". The track is a ballad sung by Ann Wilson, and was released in a remixed form as the fourth and final single from Heart's ninth studio album, Bad Animals (1987), as well as being the band's final single of the 1980s.

Cash Box praised Ann Wilson's vocal performance and the production saying "Wilson here plays her voice like Eric Clapton plays the guitar, soulful - soaring at times to emotional and technical highs."

The '88 UK CD5 and 12" releases of "Nothin' At All" contain a single remix and extended remix, respectively, of "I Want You So Bad."

== Charts ==
Chart (1988)	Peak position
Canadian Singles Chart	88
Italy Airplay (Music & Media)	20
Polish Singles Chart	24
U.S. Billboard Hot 100	49
US Cashbox Top 100	55
