= Dog & Butterfly =

Dog & Butterfly may refer to:

- Dog & Butterfly (album), a 1978 album by the American rock band Heart
- "Dog & Butterfly" (song), a 1979 song by Heart
