= Little Queen (disambiguation) =

Little Queen may refer to:

- Little Queen, a 1977 album by Heart
  - "Little Queen" (song), a 1977 song from the above album
- Little Queen (manhwa), a comedy shōjo manhwa by Kim Yeon-joo
- The Little Queen, a Canadian sports drama film released in 2014

== See also ==
- "Little Queenie", a 1959 song by Chuck Berry
