= Bad Animals =

1987 studio album by Heart

Studio album by Heart
- Released: May 15, 1987
- Studios: One on One (Hollywood); Power Station (New York City); Rumbo (Los Angeles); Can-Am (Tarzana)
- Genres: Hard rock; pop rock; glam metal; arena rock
- Length: 40:43
- Label: Capitol
- Producer: Ron Nevison

Heart chronology
Heart (1985)	Bad Animals (1987)	Brigade (1990)

Singles from Bad Animals
- 1. "Alone" Released: May 15, 1987; 2. "Who Will You Run To" Released: August 1987; 3. "There's the Girl" Released: October 1987; 4. "I Want You So Bad" Released: February 1988

Professional ratings
Review scores
Source	Rating
AllMusic	3/5 stars
Robert Christgau	C
Rolling Stone	Mixed
The Rolling Stone Album Guide	2.5/5 stars

Bad Animals is the ninth studio album by American rock band Heart, released on May 15, 1987, by Capitol Records. A continuation of the mainstream hard rock style the band adopted for its 1985 self-titled release, it enjoyed similar commercial success, peaking at number two on the US Billboard 200 in August 1987. It was certified triple platinum by the Recording Industry Association of America (RIAA) on June 4, 1992. Internationally, Bad Animals charted within the top five in Canada, Finland, Norway, Sweden, and Switzerland, and the top 10 in the United Kingdom.

The album spawned the US number-one single "Alone", while "Who Will You Run To" reached number seven, "There's the Girl" reached number 12, and "I Want You So Bad" reached number 49. Bad Animals received a nomination for Best Rock Performance by a Duo or Group with Vocal at the 30th Annual Grammy Awards in 1988.

The album features a few cover songs: "Alone" was originally recorded by the duo i-Ten on their 1983 album Taking a Cold Look, while "Wait for an Answer" was originally recorded by Dalbello on her 1984 album Whomanfoursays.

The album's title refers to the band members themselves: they would call themselves the bad animals due to the way they looked in hotel lobbies, disheveled with sunglasses, exhausted from touring.

== Track listing ==
Side one
No.	Title	Writer(s)	Length
1.	"Who Will You Run To"	Diane Warren	4:06
2.	"Alone"	Tom Kelly; Billy Steinberg	3:38
3.	"There's the Girl"	Nancy Wilson; Holly Knight	3:50
4.	"I Want You So Bad"	Kelly; Steinberg	4:21
5.	"Wait for an Answer"	Lisa Dal Bello	4:31

Side two
No.	Title	Writer(s)	Length
6.	"Bad Animals"	Ann Wilson; N. Wilson; Denny Carmassi; Mark Andes; Howard Leese	4:54
7.	"You Ain't So Tough"	Steve Kipner; Peter Beckett	4:05
8.	"Strangers of the Heart"	Duane Hitchings; Sue Shifrin; Andes	3:41
9.	"Easy Target"	A. Wilson; N. Wilson; Sue Ennis	3:58
10.	"RSVP"	A. Wilson; N. Wilson; Ennis	3:39
Total length:			40:43

== Personnel ==
Credits adapted from the liner notes of Bad Animals.

=== Heart ===
- Ann Wilson – lead vocals, background vocals
- Nancy Wilson – guitars, keyboards, lead vocals, background vocals
- Howard Leese – guitars, keyboards, background vocals
- Mark Andes – bass guitars
- Denny Carmassi – drums

=== Additional musicians ===
- Mike Moran – keyboards
- Tom Kelly – background vocals
- Holly Knight – player
- Duane Hitchings – player
- Efrain Toro – player
- Tom Salisbury – player

=== Technical ===
- Ron Nevison – production, engineering
- Toby Wright – engineering assistance
- Stan "Sly" Katayama – engineering assistance
- Julian Stoll – engineering assistance
- Mike Christopher – engineering assistance
- Jeffrey Poe – engineering assistance
- Don Barlow – guitar tech
- Paul Jamieson – drum tech
- Gary Grimm – drum tech

=== Artwork ===
- Norman Moore – design, art direction
- Phillip Dixon – photography

== Charts ==
=== Weekly charts ===
Weekly chart performance for Bad Animals
Chart (1987)	Peak position
Australian Albums (Kent Music Report)	10
Austrian Albums (Ö3 Austria)	30
Canada Top Albums/CDs (RPM)	3
Dutch Albums (Album Top 100)	9
European Albums (Music & Media)	15
Finnish Albums (Suomen virallinen lista)	4
German Albums (Offizielle Top 100)	17
Japanese Albums (Oricon)	15
Norwegian Albums (VG-lista)	4
Swedish Albums (Sverigetopplistan)	5
Swiss Albums (Schweizer Hitparade)	5
UK Albums (Official Charts)	7
US Billboard 200	2

=== Year-end charts ===
Year-end chart performance for Bad Animals
Chart (1987)	Position
Australian Albums (Kent Music Report)	61
Canada Top Albums/CDs (RPM)	8
Dutch Albums (Album Top 100)	56
European Albums (Music & Media)	34
German Albums (Offizielle Top 100)	60
Norwegian Fall Period Albums (VG-lista)	3
Swiss Albums (Schweizer Hitparade)	18
UK Albums (Gallup)	46
US Billboard 200	35

== Certifications ==
Certification for Bad Animals
Region	Certification	Certified units/sales
Canada (Music Canada)	4× Platinum	400,000^{^}
Japan (RIAJ)	Gold	100,000^{^}
United Kingdom (BPI)	Platinum	300,000^{^}
United States (RIAA)	3× Platinum	3,000,000^{^}
^{^} Shipments figures based on certification alone.
