= Even It Up =

Single by Heart

from the album Bébé le Strange
- B-side: "Pilot"
- Released: January 1980 (US)
- Recorded: 1979
- Genre: Hard rock
- Length: 3:48 (promo version); 5:09 (album/single version)
- Label: Epic
- Songwriters: Ann Wilson; Nancy Wilson; Sue Ennis
- Producer: Mike Flicker

Heart singles chronology
"Dog and Butterfly" (1979)	"Even It Up" (1980)	"Bebe le Strange" (1980)

Music video
- "Even It Up" on YouTube

"Even It Up" is a song recorded by the rock band Heart. It was released in 1980 as the first single from the band's fifth studio album Bebe le Strange. The song is an uptempo rock and roll number which lyrically is sung by a woman who is demanding that her lover "even it up" by reciprocating the effort that she has put forth in their relationship. "Even It Up" peaked at number 33 on the U.S. Billboard Hot 100.

"Even It Up" is the first of three Heart tunes to utilize the Tower of Power horn section, along with their cover of Aaron Neville's "Tell It Like It Is" and "Tall Dark Handsome Stranger" from 1990's Brigade.

"That song was written in about '79 or '80, and it was definitely a response to being obstructed as women in the rock field. There are so many systemic things that get thrown up in front of you, different glass walls and stuff. We were speaking out against it then," said singer Ann Wilson.

== Critical reception ==
Cash Box said it has "steamy lead guitar riffs" and "aggressively sensual lead vocals." Record Mirror called the song a "lightweight plod" and opined that Heart had recorded "much, much better" material in the past.

== Personnel ==
Credits adapted from the liner notes of Bebe le Strange.

Heart

- Ann Wilson – lead vocals, bass, tambourine, backup vocals
- Nancy Wilson – lead guitar, rhythm guitar, backup vocals
- Howard Leese – rhythm guitar, backup vocals
- Michael DeRosier – drums

Additional musicians

- Tower of Power (Lenny Pickett, Greg Adams, Emilio Castillo, Steve Kupka, Mic Gillette) – horn section

== Chart performance ==
Chart (1980)	Peak position
Canadian Singles Chart	56
U.S. Billboard Hot 100	33
