= All I Wanna Do Is Make Love to You =

1990 single by Heart

- Cover art for the single with alternate title

Single by Heart

from the album Brigade
- B-side: "Call of the Wild"; "Cruel Tears"
- Released: March 12, 1990
- Length: 5:09 (album version); 4:29 (7-inch edit)
- Label: Capitol
- Songwriter: Robert John "Mutt" Lange
- Producer: Richie Zito

Heart singles chronology
| "I Want You So Bad" (1988) | "All I Wanna Do Is Make Love to You" (1990) | "I Didn't Want to Need You" (1990) |

Music video
- All I Wanna Do Is Make Love to You on YouTube

"All I Wanna Do Is Make Love to You" is a song by American rock band Heart. It was composed by veteran songwriter and producer Robert John "Mutt" Lange and released as the lead single from the band's tenth studio album, Brigade (1990), in March 1990. The song was first recorded as "All I Want to Do Is Make Love to You" by Dobie Gray in 1979, though with different lyrics. The Heart version tells the story of a woman who sets out to seduce a hitchhiker in order to become pregnant because although there is a man in her life, he is infertile.

"All I Wanna Do Is Make Love to You" was a success, spending two weeks at number two on the US Billboard Hot 100, while the US Cash Box Top 100 had them going to number one the week of June 2, 1990. On the Adult Contemporary chart, the song climbed to number six, becoming the third of Heart's four top-ten AC hits. It also peaked at number eight on the UK Singles Chart and number one in Canada and Australia. At the 33rd Annual Grammy Awards, the song was nominated for the Grammy Award for Best Pop Vocal Performance by a Duo or Group, and is the only one of Heart's singles to have been certified gold by the RIAA.

== Background ==
In the liner notes of Heart's album The Road Home, Ann Wilson commented on the band's dislike for the song, stating, "Actually we had sworn off it because it kind of stood for everything we wanted to get away from. It was a song by 'Mutt' Lange, who we liked, and it was originally written for Don Henley, but there was a lot of pressure on us to do the song at the time." Ann Wilson has made a number of comments on her dislike for the song, calling the song's message "hideous" in an interview with Dan Rather. In that same interview, Ann mentions that she is surprised at how many of their fans, especially in Australia and New Zealand, want to hear the song to this day when Heart plays live.

The 7-inch single features an edited 4:29 version of the album track (5:10). The 12-inch and CD versions featured the non-LP track "Cruel Tears". In the UK, a very limited "tour edition" 12-inch single was released, on clear vinyl.

== Content ==
The original song as recorded by Dobie Gray in 1979 was a love song without a storyline, unlike the later version by Heart.

In the Heart version of the song, which is also played out in the accompanying music video, interspersed with sequences of the band performing the song, singer Ann Wilson sings of a one-night stand with a handsome young male hitchhiker. They make their way to a hotel room to have sex. The lyrics suggest that this may not be the first time the female protagonist has engaged in such behaviors, noting her familiarity with this particular hotel. The song explicitly highlights the sexual prowess of the young man, and his ability to easily and repeatedly bring the female protagonist to orgasm. She leaves a note with instructions for the man to make no attempt to contact her or track her down. It is subsequently revealed that her intent all along was to use the encounter as a way to become pregnant. The lyrics explain later, when she accidentally crosses paths with the one-time lover, that her baby is the result of their tryst and she did it only because the man she is in love with is not able to father children.

== Charts ==
=== Weekly charts ===
| Chart (1990) | Peak position |
|---|---|
| Australia (ARIA) | 1 |
| Austria (Ö3 Austria Top 40) | 30 |
| Belgium (Ultratop 50 Flanders) | 4 |
| Canada Retail Singles (The Record) | 1 |
| Canada Top Singles (RPM) | 1 |
| Canada Adult Contemporary (RPM) | 12 |
| Europe (Eurochart Hot 100) | 18 |
| Finland (Suomen virallinen lista) | 5 |
| Ireland (IRMA) | 11 |
| Netherlands (Dutch Top 40) | 5 |
| Netherlands (Single Top 100) | 4 |
| New Zealand (Recorded Music NZ) | 4 |
| Norway (VG-lista) | 3 |
| Sweden (Sverigetopplistan) | 2 |
| Switzerland (Schweizer Hitparade) | 12 |
| UK Singles (Official Charts) | 8 |
| US Billboard Hot 100 | 2 |
| US Adult Contemporary (Billboard) | 6 |
| US Mainstream Rock Airplay (Billboard) | 2 |
| US Cash Box Top 100 | 1 |
| West Germany (GfK) | 23 |

=== Year-end charts ===
| Chart (1990) | Position |
|---|---|
| Australia (ARIA) | 5 |
| Belgium (Ultratop) | 28 |
| Canada Top Singles (RPM) | 7 |
| Europe (Eurochart Hot 100) | 63 |
| Germany (Media Control) | 92 |
| Netherlands (Dutch Top 40) | 42 |
| Netherlands (Single Top 100) | 14 |
| New Zealand (RIANZ) | 18 |
| Sweden (Topplistan) | 11 |
| US Billboard Hot 100 | 16 |
| US Adult Contemporary (Billboard) | 50 |
| US Cash Box Top 100 | 12 |

=== Decade-end charts ===
| Chart (1990–1999) | Position |
|---|---|
| Canada (Nielsen SoundScan) | 81 |

== Certifications ==
| Region | Certification | Certified units/sales |
|---|---|---|
| Australia (ARIA) | Platinum | 70,000^{^} |
| Canada (Music Canada) | Gold | 50,000^{^} |
| New Zealand (RMNZ) | Platinum | 30,000^{‡} |
| United Kingdom (BPI) | Silver | 200,000^{‡} |
| United States (RIAA) | Gold | 500,000^{^} |
^{^} Shipments figures based on certification alone.^{‡} Sales+streaming figures based on certification alone.

== Release history ==
| Region | Date | Format(s) | Label(s) | Ref. |
|---|---|---|---|---|
| United Kingdom | March 12, 1990 | 7-inch vinyl; 12-inch vinyl; CD; cassette | Capitol | |
| United States | March 14, 1990 | 7-inch vinyl; cassette | Capitol | |
| Australia | March 26, 1990 | 7-inch vinyl; cassette | Capitol; EMI | |
| Japan | March 28, 1990 | Mini-CD | Capitol | |
