= Heartless (Heart song) =

Single by Heart

from the album Magazine
- B-side: "Just the Wine"
- Released: March 1978 (US)
- Recorded: 1976
- Genre: Hard rock
- Length: 3:54 (Promo Version); 5:00 (Album/Single Version)
- Label: Mushroom Records
- Songwriters: Ann Wilson; Nancy Wilson
- Producer: Mike Flicker

Heart singles chronology
"Kick It Out" (1977)	"Heartless" (1978)	"Straight On" (1978)

"Heartless" is a song written and recorded by the rock band Heart in 1976 for their album Magazine. Issues with the band's previous record label Mushroom caused a delay in the album's release and "Heartless" was released as a single two years later, after the re-issue of their first single "Crazy on You".

== Background ==
The song is an aggressive hard rock number that opens with a slower synthesizer based interlude before opening up into a full hard rock tune. The lyrics involve a scorned lover who apparently can't get away from the grasp of her heartless partner. "The doctor said come back again next week / I think that you need me / All she did was cry / She wanted to die/Doctor when can you see me / There's a guy out there / Seems like he's everywhere / It just ain't fair."

"Heartless" and "Without You" were the only singles released from Magazine, with "Heartless" peaking at number twenty-four on the US Billboard Hot 100. Cash Box particularly praised the vocals and bass guitar playing. Record World called it "straight-ahead, rather funky rock, with Ann Wilson's vocal the centerpiece." Only five months passed before Heart released their next album, Dog and Butterfly.

== Personnel ==
Credits adapted from the liner notes of the 1978 revised version of Magazine.

- Ann Wilson – lead vocals, acoustic guitar
- Nancy Wilson – lead guitar, backing vocals
- Roger Fisher – guitar solo
- Howard Leese – guitar solo, keyboards
- Steve Fossen – bass
- Michael DeRosier – drums

== Chart performance ==
=== Weekly charts ===
Chart (1978)	Peak position
Canadian RPM Top Singles	18
US Billboard Hot 100	24
US Cash Box Top 100	18

=== Year-end charts ===
Chart (1978)	Rank
Canada	146
US (Joel Whitburn's Pop Annual)	157
