= Straight On =

Single by Heart

from the album Dog & Butterfly
- B-side: "Lighter Touch"
- Released: September 1978
- Recorded: 1978
- Genre: Hard rock, disco
- Length: 4:11 (promo version); 5:01 (single version); 5:07 (album version)
- Label: Portrait
- Songwriters: Ann Wilson; Nancy Wilson; Sue Ennis
- Producers: Mike Flicker, Heart, Michael Fisher

Heart singles chronology
| "Heartless" (1978) | "Straight On" (1978) | "Dog & Butterfly" (1978) |

"Straight On" is a song recorded by the rock band Heart. It was released as the first single from the band's 1978 album Dog & Butterfly. In the U.S., "Straight On" became Heart's third single to crack the top twenty, peaking at number fifteen on the Billboard Hot 100. The song was co-written by Ann Wilson, Nancy Wilson, and Sue Ennis. "Straight On" was released during Heart's classic era and has been part of the group's setlist almost constantly since its release. It still was during their 2016 tour.

== Background ==
The song is a mid-tempo rock number which incorporates a funky, almost dance-oriented bass line. Ann Wilson has called the song Heart's first "dance song", which is likely indicative of its recording and release happening during the disco era of the late 1970s. The lyrics use gambling metaphors to illustrate the protagonist heading straight on for her partner's love.

Cash Box said it has "high-soaring vocals," "a steady bass drum beat" and an "exchange of riffs between guitars." Record World called it "a bluesy rock ballad highlighted by the Wilson sisters' familiar vocals."

== Personnel ==
Credits adapted from the liner notes of Dog & Butterfly.

- Ann Wilson – lead vocals
- Nancy Wilson – acoustic guitar, backing vocals
- Roger Fisher – electric guitar
- Howard Leese – electric guitar
- Steve Fossen – bass
- Michael Derosier – drums

== Chart performance ==
| Chart (1978) | Peak position |
|---|---|
| Canadian Singles Chart | 14 |
| U.S. Billboard Hot 100 | 15 |
