= Bébé le Strange =

Studio album by Heart
- Released: February 13, 1980
- Recorded: 1979
- Studios: Kaye-Smith, Seattle, Washington
- Genre: Hard rock
- Length: 37:30
- Label: Epic
- Producers: Mike Flicker; Connie (Note: Connie is a pseudonym for Nancy Wilson, Sue Ennis, and Ann Wilson.); Howie

Heart chronology
| Dog & Butterfly (1978) | Bébé le Strange (1980) | Greatest Hits/Live (1980) |

Singles from Bébé le Strange
- 1. "Even It Up" Released: January 1980; 2. "Raised on You" Released: April 1980; 3. "Bebe le Strange" Released: June 1980

Bébé le Strange is the fifth studio album by American rock band Heart, released on February 13, 1980, by Epic Records. It was the first album without founding member Roger Fisher on lead guitar, who had left the band months prior along with his brother Michael.

The album was a commercial success, peaking at number five on the US Billboard 200 and spending 22 weeks on the chart. On May 5, 1980, it was certified Gold by the Recording Industry Association of America (RIAA). Bébé le Strange spawned the singles "Even It Up" (backed by the Tower of Power horn section) and the title track. Some of the backing vocals were provided by Don Wilhelm, who had been in a group called The Army with Steve Fossen and Roger Fisher in the 1960s.

On June 29, 2004, the album was re-released by Epic and Legacy Recordings in a remastered expanded edition, containing two bonus tracks: the studio outtake "Jackleg Man" and a live version of "Break".

== Critical reception ==
Professional ratings
Review scores
| Source | Rating |
|---|---|
| AllMusic | 3/5 stars |
| Christgau's Record Guide | B+ |
| PopMatters | Unfavorable |
| Rolling Stone | Unfavorable |
| The Rolling Stone Album Guide | 3/5 stars |

Record World wrote of the single "Raised on You" that "Anne's [sic] lavish lead is enhanced by bold keyboard runs and Nancy's confident guitar."

== Track listing ==
All tracks are written by Ann Wilson, Sue Ennis, and Nancy Wilson, except where noted.

Side one
| No. | Title | Writer(s) | Length |
|---|---|---|---|
| 1. | "Bébé le Strange" | A. Wilson; Ennis; N. Wilson; Roger Fisher | 3:38 |
| 2. | "Down on Me" | | 4:46 |
| 3. | "Silver Wheels" | N. Wilson | 1:22 |
| 4. | "Break" | | 2:32 |
| 5. | "Rockin Heaven Down" | | 5:52 |

Side two
| No. | Title | Writer(s) | Length |
|---|---|---|---|
| 6. | "Even It Up" | | 5:10 |
| 7. | "Strange Night" | | 4:16 |
| 8. | "Raised on You" | N. Wilson | 3:21 |
| 9. | "Pilot" | | 3:15 |
| 10. | "Sweet Darlin'" | A. Wilson | 3:18 |
| Total length: | | | 37:30 |

2004 remastered reissue bonus tracks
| No. | Title | Length |
|---|---|---|
| 11. | "Jackleg Man" (previously unreleased) | 3:02 |
| 12. | "Break" (live) | 3:03 |
| Total length: | | 43:35 |

== Personnel ==
Credits adapted from the liner notes of Bébé le Strange.

=== Heart ===
- Ann Wilson – lead vocals (tracks 1, 2, 4–7, 9, 10); tambourine (tracks 1, 5, 6, 10); bass (tracks 1, 6, 10); backup vocals (tracks 1, 6, 7, 9); drums, alto flute, piano (track 10)
- Nancy Wilson – guitars (tracks 1, 4, 9); backup vocals (tracks 1, 5–7, 9); rhythm guitars (tracks 2, 6); Mellotron (track 2); acoustic guitars (tracks 3, 7); electric guitar (track 5); lead guitar (track 6); lead vocals, all instruments except drums (track 8)
- Howard Leese – guitars (tracks 1, 4, 9); lead guitar (track 2); synthesizer (track 2); backward solo (track 4); electric guitar (tracks 5, 7); acoustic guitars (track 5); backup vocals (tracks 5, 9); rhythm guitars (track 6); keyboards (track 9)
- Michael Derosier – drums (tracks 1, 2, 4–9); rhythm instruments (track 7)
- Steve Fossen – bass (tracks 2, 4, 5, 7, 9)

=== Additional musicians ===
- Sue Ennis – guitar (track 1); piano (track 10)
- Chrissy Shefts – guitar (track 1)
- Connie – acoustic guitars (tracks 5, 10)
- Don Wilhelm – backup vocals (track 5)
- Gary Humphreys – backup vocals (track 5)
- Tower of Power (Lenny Pickett, Greg Adams, Emilio Castillo, Steve Kupka, Mic Gillette) – horn section (track 6)

=== Technical ===
- Mike Flicker – production, engineering, mixing
- Connie – production
- Howie – production
- Rob Perkins – engineering
- Armin Steiner – horn engineering (track 6)
- Stewart Whitmore – horn engineering assistance (track 6)
- John Golden – mastering at Kendun Recorders (Burbank, California)

=== Artwork ===
- Tony Lane – art direction
- Tom Girvin – logo graphics
- Jeff Burger – photography

== Charts ==
=== Weekly charts ===
Weekly chart performance for Bébé le Strange
| Chart (1980) | Peak position |
|---|---|
| Australian Albums (Kent Music Report) | 78 |
| Canada Top Albums/CDs (RPM) | 24 |
| Japanese Albums (Oricon) | 62 |
| New Zealand Albums (RMNZ) | 50 |
| US Billboard 200 | 5 |

=== Year-end charts ===
Year-end chart performance for Bébé le Strange
| Chart (1980) | Position |
|---|---|
| US Billboard 200 | 86 |

== Certifications ==
Certifications for Bébé le Strange
| Region | Certification | Certified units/sales |
|---|---|---|
| Canada (Music Canada) | Platinum | 100,000^{^} |
| United States (RIAA) | Gold | 500,000^{^} |
^{^} Shipments figures based on certification alone.
