= Brigade (album) =

1990 studio album by Heart

Studio album by Heart
- Released: March 26, 1990
- Studios: One on One (North Hollywood); A&M (Hollywood)
- Genres: Hard rock; pop rock
- Length: 54:33
- Label: Capitol
- Producer: Richie Zito

Heart chronology
Bad Animals (1987)	Brigade (1990)	Rock the House Live! (1991)

Singles from Brigade
- 1. "All I Wanna Do Is Make Love to You" Released: March 1990; 2. "I Didn't Want to Need You" Released: June 1990; 3. "Stranded" Released: September 1990; 4. "Secret" Released: February 1991 (UK)

Professional ratings
Review scores
Source	Rating
AllMusic	2/5 stars
Entertainment Weekly	C+
Rolling Stone	2/5 stars
The Rolling Stone Album Guide	2/5 stars
Smash Hits	4/10 stars

Brigade is the tenth studio album by American rock band Heart, released on March 26, 1990, by Capitol Records. The album reached number three on both the US Billboard 200 and the UK Albums Chart, while peaking at number two in Canada, Finland, and Sweden. The album's lead single, "All I Wanna Do Is Make Love to You", reached number two on the Billboard Hot 100. Subsequent singles "I Didn't Want to Need You" and "Stranded" peaked at numbers 23 and 13 on the Billboard Hot 100, respectively; "Secret", the fourth and final single, charted at number 64. The album was also notable for containing six tracks that charted inside the Top 25 on Billboard's Album Rock Tracks chart: "Wild Child" number 3, "Tall, Dark Handsome Stranger" number 24, All I Wanna Do is Make Love To You" number 2, "I Didn't Want to Need You" number 13, "Stranded" number 25, "The Night" number 25.

The album was followed by a successful world tour. Like its 1987 predecessor Bad Animals, Brigade is notable for having fewer writing contributions from lead members Ann and Nancy Wilson, but would be the last of Heart's albums to prominently feature outside writers.

== Track listing ==
No.	Title	Writer(s)	Length
1.	"Wild Child"	Robert John "Mutt" Lange; Craig Joiner; Anthony Mitman	4:27
2.	"All I Wanna Do Is Make Love to You"	Lange	5:05
3.	"Secret"	Franne Golde; Bruce Roberts	4:10
4.	"Tall, Dark Handsome Stranger"	Holly Knight; Albert Hammond	4:00
5.	"I Didn't Want to Need You"	Diane Warren	4:05
6.	"The Night"	Sammy Hagar; Denny Carmassi; Ann Wilson; Nancy Wilson	4:50
7.	"Fallen from Grace"	Hagar; Jesse Harms; Carmassi	4:02
8.	"Under the Sky"	A. Wilson; N. Wilson; Sue Ennis	2:51
9.	"Cruel Nights"	Warren	3:58
10.	"Stranded"	Jaime Kyle; Jeff Harrington	3:55
11.	"Call of the Wild"	A. Wilson; N. Wilson; Howard Leese; Mark Andes; Carmassi; Ennis	4:00
12.	"I Want Your World to Turn"	Tom Kelly; Billy Steinberg	4:32
13.	"I Love You"	A. Wilson; N. Wilson; Knight; Hammond	3:50
Total length:			54:33

Japanese limited edition bonus mini CD
No.	Title	Writer(s)	Length
1.	"Cruel Tears"	Mark Spiro; A. Wilson; N. Wilson	4:18
2.	"Never Stop Loving You"	Sue Shifrin; John Wetton; David Cassidy	3:59
3.	"The Will to Love"	Kelly; Steinberg; A. Wilson; N. Wilson	4:21
Total length:			12:38

== Personnel ==
Credits adapted from the liner notes of Brigade.

=== Heart ===
- Ann Wilson – lead vocals, background vocals
- Nancy Wilson – lead vocals, background vocals, electric guitar, acoustic guitar, keyboards, mandolin, blues harp, Dobro
- Howard Leese – background vocals, lead guitar, rhythm guitar, keyboards, mandolin, autoharp
- Denny Carmassi – drums
- Mark Andes – background vocals, bass

=== Additional musicians ===
- Kim Bullard – additional keyboards (tracks 1–3, 5, 7–10, 12)
- Sterling – additional keyboards (track 13)
- Richie Zito – additional guitar (track 10)

=== Technical ===
- Richie Zito – production
- Phil Kaffel – recording, mixing
- Mike Tacci – second engineer
- Randy Wine – second engineer
- Chad Munsey – second engineer
- Ed Goodreau – second engineer
- Bill Kennedy – second engineer
- Nick Jerrard – second engineer
- Katy Parks – production coordination
- Randy Skirvin – guitar tech
- Zeke Clark – guitar tech
- Don Barlow – guitar tech
- Paul Jamieson – drum tech

=== Artwork ===
- Norman Moore – art direction, design
- Michael Miller – photography

== Charts ==
=== Weekly charts ===
Weekly chart performance for Brigade
Chart (1990)	Peak position
Australian Albums (ARIA)	11
Canada Top Albums/CDs (RPM)	2
Dutch Albums (Album Top 100)	16
European Albums (Music & Media)	10
Finnish Albums (Suomen virallinen lista)	2
German Albums (Offizielle Top 100)	14
Icelandic Albums (Tónlist)	7
Japanese Albums (Oricon)	6
New Zealand Albums (RMNZ)	7
Norwegian Albums (VG-lista)	7
Swedish Albums (Sverigetopplistan)	2
Swiss Albums (Schweizer Hitparade)	11
UK Albums (Official Charts)	3
US Billboard 200	3

=== Year-end charts ===
Year-end chart performance for Brigade
Chart (1990)	Position
Canada Top Albums/CDs (RPM)	6
European Albums (Music & Media)	44
German Albums (Offizielle Top 100)	74
Swiss Albums (Schweizer Hitparade)	38
US Billboard 200	26

== Certifications ==
Certifications for Brigade
Region	Certification	Certified units/sales
Australia (ARIA)	Gold	35,000^{^}
Canada (Music Canada)	5× Platinum	500,000^{^}
Japan (RIAJ)	Gold	100,000^{^}
New Zealand (RMNZ)	Gold	7,500^{^}
Singapore (RIAS)	Gold	7,500
Sweden (GLF)	Gold	50,000^{^}
United Kingdom (BPI)	Gold	100,000^{^}
United States (RIAA)	2× Platinum	2,000,000^{^}
^{^} Shipments figures based on certification alone.
