= Kick It Out =

Kick It Out may refer to:

- "Kick It Out" (Boom Boom Satellites song)
- "Kick It Out" (Heart song)
- Kick It Out (organisation), an association football anti-racism campaign
