= Bebe le Strange (song) =

Single by Heart

from the album Bébé le Strange
- Released: June 1980
- Recorded: 1979
- Genre: Hard rock
- Length: 3:38
- Label: Epic
- Songwriters: Ann Wilson; Sue Ennis; Nancy Wilson; Roger Fisher
- Producer: Mike Flicker

Heart singles chronology
"Even It Up" (1980)	"Bebe le Strange" (1980)	"Tell It Like It Is" (1980)

"Bebe le Strange" is a song recorded by the rock band Heart. It was released in 1980 as the second single from the band's fifth studio album Bébé le Strange. It was the first song from the band not to chart on the U.S. Billboard Hot 100, and was the final single released from the album. Heart's fortunes reversed later in 1980 with the release of "Tell It Like It Is", which became a U.S. top-ten single.

Cash Box called it "aggressive, two-fisted rock ‘n’ roll" with "brawny bass and guitar riffs."

== Personnel ==
Credits adapted from the liner notes of Bebe le Strange.

Heart

- Ann Wilson – lead vocals, bass, tambourine, backup vocals
- Nancy Wilson – electric guitar, backup vocals
- Howard Leese – electric guitar
- Michael Derosier – drums

Additional musicians

- Sue Ennis – guitar
- Chrissy Shefts - guitar

== Chart performance ==
Chart (1980)	Peak position
US Billboard	109
