= There's the Girl =

Single by Heart

from the album Bad Animals
- B-side: "Bad Animals"
- Released: October 1987 (US)
- Genre: Electronic rock, hard rock
- Length: 3:42 (7" remix); 3:51 (album version)
- Label: Capitol
- Songwriters: Holly Knight; Nancy Wilson
- Producer: Ron Nevison

Heart singles chronology
"Who Will You Run To" (1987)	"There's the Girl" (1987)	"I Want You So Bad" (1988)

"There's the Girl" is a song recorded by the American rock band Heart. It was composed by Holly Knight and Heart band member Nancy Wilson. "There's the Girl" was released in a remixed version as the third single from Heart's ninth studio album, Bad Animals. Knight is known as a very successful songwriter who was responsible for penning many hit singles during the 1980s.

Like Heart's 1986 #1 single "These Dreams", the lead vocals on "There's the Girl" were performed by Nancy Wilson, rather than Ann Wilson, the usual lead singer for the group (though most fans did not realize this until the video was released or they saw the song performed live). The single climbed to #12 on the U.S. Billboard Hot 100 and was also a Top-40 single on the UK Singles Chart, where it peaked at #34.

Cash Box called it a "gorgeous pop/rock number."

== Versions and formats ==
The 7" version was remixed from "Bad Animals" and ran for 3:42; it includes the additional lines
She's setting you up my friend
She's gonna break your heart again
initially before the middle eight and repeated after the final chorus, which were not on the album version or the 12" mix, but feature in the video, which was included on the 1988 VHS release If Looks Could KILL.

The 12" and CD single version featured an extended remix by Tom Lord Alge, running at 7:22. A very limited edition of the UK 12" single release came with a giant double-sided poster incorporating a 1988 calendar.

An even more scarce format of this release is the Japanese 3" CD single, which features an exclusive extended version of Heart's previous single "Alone" clocking in at 5:30, as well as the unedited 12" Remix of "There's The Girl" which does not have an early fade-out. Both of these tracks are exclusive to this Japanese release and not found elsewhere.

== Chart performance ==
Chart (1987–1988)	Peak position
Canadian Singles Chart	31
Polish Singles Chart	14
UK Singles Chart	34
U.S. Billboard Hot 100	12
U.S. Billboard Mainstream Rock Chart	16
US Cashbox Top 100	19

== Other versions ==
- 1987: Mexican singer Sasha Sokol in a version named Dos extraños y una noche.
