= Sap (EP) =

1992 EP by Alice in Chains

EP by Alice in Chains
- Released: February 4, 1992
- Recorded: November 1991
- Studio: London Bridge (Seattle)
- Genres: Acoustic rock; alternative rock; grunge
- Length: 20:49
- Label: Columbia
- Producers: Alice in Chains; Rick Parashar

Alice in Chains chronology
Facelift (1990)	Sap (1992)	Dirt (1992)

Sap is the third studio release and second EP by the American rock band Alice in Chains, released on February 4, 1992, through Columbia Records. Sap is mostly acoustic and marks the first time that guitarist Jerry Cantrell sings lead vocals in an Alice in Chains release, with the song "Brother". The EP was produced by Alice in Chains and Rick Parashar and features guest vocals by Ann Wilson of the band Heart, Chris Cornell of Soundgarden and Mark Arm of Mudhoney. The track "Got Me Wrong" became a hit two years later after being featured on the soundtrack to the 1994 film Clerks. On January 14, 1994, Sap was certified gold by the RIAA for the sale of more than 500,000 copies.

== Background and recording ==
Following the tour for Facelift, Alice in Chains entered the studio to record a song for the Cameron Crowe movie Singles, but decided to turn the engagement to their advantage. As the guitarist Jerry Cantrell recalled: "So in the session that was meant for recording that one song Would?, we ended up demoing about 10 songs, which included all the stuff that ended up on the [1992] Sap EP, 'Rooster' and a couple of others from Dirt."

While in the studio, drummer Sean Kinney had a dream about "making an EP called Sap." The band decided "not to mess with fate," and Sap was recorded and mixed in 1991 with producer Rick Parashar at London Bridge Studio.

The EP was recorded in four or five days in November 1991.

== Music and lyrics ==
Lead vocalist Layne Staley encouraged guitarist Jerry Cantrell to sing lead vocals on the EP. Cantrell sings lead vocals on "Brother" and splits lead vocals with Staley on "Got Me Wrong".

The EP features guest vocals by Ann Wilson from the band Heart, who joined vocalist Layne Staley and guitarist Jerry Cantrell for the choruses of "Brother" and "Am I Inside". It also features Mark Arm of Mudhoney and Chris Cornell of Soundgarden, who appeared together on the song "Right Turn", credited to "Alice Mudgarden" in the liner notes. The song was featured in the 2001 film Black Hawk Down. It was guitarist Jerry Cantrell who invited Wilson, Cornell and Arm to sing on Sap.

Regarding the lyrical content, Cantrell said he wrote "Brother" about his relationship with his younger brother. The song specifically refers to the period after Cantrell's parents divorced, when his younger brother went off to live with his father while he stayed with his mother, and Cantrell said that the song "was a way of trying to build a bridge." Commenting on "Got Me Wrong", Cantrell said he wrote the song about a relationship where one person thinks he or she can change the other person, and added that the song speaks of "the different ways that men and women see each other."

A version of the song "Rooster" was recorded during the sessions for Sap and was to be included on the EP, but the band then decided to use the song on their second full-length album instead. This version is featured on the band's 1999 box set Music Bank.

The hidden track, "Love Song", described by Cantrell as "the most bizarre song we've ever recorded", was Kinney's idea. All four members switched instruments for the recording, with Kinney on lead vocals and piano, Starr on guitar, Cantrell on bass, and Staley on drums.

== Release and reception ==
Professional ratings
Review scores
Source	Rating
AllMusic	4/5 stars
The Encyclopedia of Popular Music	3/5 stars
The Great Rock Discography	5/10
MusicHound Rock	2/5 stars
Music Story	4/5 stars
The Rolling Stone Album Guide	3/5 stars
Spin Alternative Record Guide	7/10

On February 4, 1992, Alice in Chains released their second EP, Sap. The band did not want any ads or promotion for the EP, they just put it in the stores to see if people would buy it. Cantrell said that Alice in Chains released Sap "without any fuss or fanfare so as the real Alice fans could find it." The EP was released while Nirvana's Nevermind was at the top of the Billboard 200 charts, resulting in a rising popularity of Seattle-based bands, and the term grunge music. Sap was soon certified gold.

The album was re-released on March 21, 1995, when "Got Me Wrong" became a hit after its inclusion on the soundtrack to the 1994 film, Clerks. The re-released version included lyrics and slightly different artwork. The aforementioned song, as well as "Brother," were performed live during Alice in Chains' MTV Unplugged concert.

In addition to the CD, the album was also released in a limited edition double vinyl along with Jar of Flies (Jar of Flies was on sides 1 and 2, Sap was on side 3, and an etching of the Alice in Chains logo was on side 4). In the UK, Sap and Jar of Flies were issued as a double CD, as Sap had not previously had a UK release. In the UK, "Brother" and "Right Turn" were initially released on the "Would" single and "Got Me Wrong" and "Am I Inside" were released on the "Them Bones" single. Hidden track "Love Song" never appeared on a UK single release and was previously unreleased when Sap was released with Jar of Flies.

== Track listing ==
Sap track listing
No.	Title	Writer(s)	Length
1.	"Brother"	Jerry Cantrell	4:27
2.	"Got Me Wrong"	Cantrell	4:12
3.	"Right Turn" (performed by Alice Mudgarden)	Cantrell	3:17
4.	"Am I Inside"	Cantrell; Layne Staley	5:09
5.	"Love Song" (hidden track)	Cantrell; Sean Kinney; Staley; Michael Starr	3:44
Total length:			20:49

Note

- "Alice Mudgarden" is Alice in Chains with Mark Arm of Mudhoney and Chris Cornell of Soundgarden.

== Personnel ==
Personnel taken from Sap liner notes.

Alice in Chains

- Layne Staley – vocals, drums on "Love Song"
- Jerry Cantrell – guitar, vocals, bass on "Love Song"
- Michael Starr – bass, guitar on "Love Song"
- Sean Kinney – drums, percussion, megaphone and piano on "Love Song"

Additional vocalists

- Ann Wilson – vocals on "Brother" and "Am I Inside"
- Chris Cornell – vocals on "Right Turn" (as Alice Mudgarden)
- Mark Arm – vocals on "Right Turn" (as Alice Mudgarden)

Production

- Produced by Alice in Chains and Rick Parashar
- Mastered by Eddy Schreyer at Future Disc Systems, Hollywood, CA
- Art direction by David Coleman
- Photography by Rocky Schenck

== Charts ==
Chart (1994)	Peak position
Australian Albums (ARIA) with Jar of Flies	2
Danish Singles (IFPI)	6
Swedish Albums (Sverigetopplistan) with Jar of Flies	8
UK Albums (Official Charts) with Jar of Flies	4

Chart (2020)	Peak position
US Billboard 200	134
US Top Rock Albums (Billboard)	20

=== Singles ===
Year	Single	Peak position	
Year	Single	US Main	US Mod
1994	"Got Me Wrong"	7	22

== Certifications ==
Region	Certification	Certified units/sales
United States (RIAA)	Gold	500,000^{^}
^{^} Shipments figures based on certification alone.
