= Hope & Glory (album) =

Studio album by Ann Wilson
- Released: September 11, 2007
- Recorded: 2006
- Genre: Rock, folk
- Label: Rounder
- Producer: Ben Mink

Professional ratings
Review scores
Source	Rating
AllMusic	3.5/5 stars

Hope & Glory is the first solo album by Heart singer Ann Wilson, released on September 11, 2007.

It is an album of cover versions that features guest appearances from Elton John, k.d. lang, Alison Krauss, Gretchen Wilson, Shawn Colvin, Rufus Wainwright, Wynonna Judd and Deana Carter. Ann's sister, Nancy, also contributed.

The Hope & Glory version of Led Zeppelin's "Immigrant Song" is available on Wilson's official Myspace page, and charted as "the #9 most podcasted song of 2007" on the PMC Top 10's annual countdown.

== Track listing ==
No.	Title	Writer(s)	Original artist	Length
1.	"Goodbye Blue Sky" (featuring Nancy Wilson)	Roger Waters	Pink Floyd	3:12
2.	"Where to Now St. Peter?" (with Elton John)	Elton John, Bernie Taupin	Elton John	4:38
3.	"Jackson" (with k.d. lang)	Lucinda Williams	Lucinda Williams	3:36
4.	"We Gotta Get Out of This Place" (with Wynonna Judd)	Barry Mann, Cynthia Weil	The Animals	3:45
5.	"Immigrant Song"	Jimmy Page, Robert Plant	Led Zeppelin	3:43
6.	"Darkness, Darkness" (featuring Nancy Wilson)	Jesse Colin Young	The Youngbloods	4:37
7.	"Bad Moon Rising" (with Gretchen Wilson)	John Fogerty	Creedence Clearwater Revival	3:15
8.	"War of Man" (with Alison Krauss)	Neil Young	Neil Young	4:38
9.	"Get Together" (with Nancy Wilson, Deana Carter & Wynonna Judd)	Chet Powers	The Youngbloods	4:03
10.	"Isolation"	John Lennon	John Lennon	3:02
11.	"A Hard Rain's A-Gonna Fall" (with Rufus Wainwright & Shawn Colvin)	Bob Dylan	Bob Dylan	6:14
12.	"Little Problems, Little Lies"	Ben Mink, Ann Wilson		3:31

iTunes Bonus Track
No.	Title	Writer(s)	Original artist	Length
13.	"American Tune"	Paul Simon	Paul Simon	4:53

Rhapsody Bonus Track
No.	Title	Writer(s)	Original artist	Length
13.	"Sail Away"	Randy Newman	Randy Newman	3:05

== Production ==
- Ben Mink – producer, recording
- Patrick MacDougall – recording (1, 6, 9)
- Matt Still – recording (2)
- Masa Fukudome – recording (3)
- David Leonard – recording (4, 9), mixing
- Bart Pursley – recording (7)
- Gary Paczosa – recording (8)
- Rick Depofi – recording (11)
- Tom Schick – recording (11)
- Brandon McWhorter – recording assistant (3)
- Gordon Hammond – recording assistant (4, 9)
- Jason Lefan – assistant engineer (7)
- Brandon Bell – recording assistant (8)
- Scott Lehrer – second engineer (11)
- Stephen Marcussen – mastering at Marcussen Mastering (Hollywood, California)
- Racheal E. Sullivan – design
- Randee St. Nicholas – photography
- Carol Peters – management

== Personnel ==
- Ann Wilson – lead vocals, backing vocals (1, 5, 8), handclaps (7)
- Ben Mink – keyboards (1, 5–8, 10–12), electric guitars (1–8, 10–12), acoustic guitars (1–8, 10–12), drum programming (1–4, 8, 10–12), percussion (1–4, 6–12), violin (1, 2, 5, 6, 9), cuatro (2), viola (2, 5, 9), organ (3, 4), charango (3), lap steel guitar (3), fiddle (3, 6), strings (4, 10–12), handclaps (7), dobro (8, 11), steel guitar (9), mandocello (9), bass (12)
- Teddy Borowiecki – acoustic piano (1, 4–8, 10, 11), accordion (7)
- Elton John – acoustic piano (2), vocals (2)
- David Eaman – banjo (8)
- David Piltch – bass (1, 3, 4, 6, 7, 9–11)
- Ric Markmann – electric bass (2, 5, 8)
- Randall Stoll – drums (1, 3, 4, 6, 7, 10, 11)
- Ben Smith – drums (2, 5, 8), percussion (8)
- Nancy Wilson – vocals (1, 6, 9), backing vocals (1), electric guitars (6), acoustic guitars (6, 9), handclaps (7), organ (9), percussion (9)
- Ingrid Friesen – backing vocals (2)
- Isabel Mink – backing vocals (2)
- Lucie Mink – backing vocals (2)
- k.d. lang – vocals (3)
- Wynonna Judd – vocals (4, 9)
- Gretchen Wilson – vocals (7)
- Alison Krauss – vocals (8)
- Deana Carter – vocals (9)
- Shawn Colvin – vocals (11)
- Rufus Wainwright – vocals (11)
