= The Zoo (American band) =

American Rock Band

- Origin: Los Angeles, California
- Genres: psychedelic rock
- Years active: 1966–1968
- Labels: Sunburst Records, Big Beat Records
- Past members: Murphy "Chocolate Moose" Carfagna; Mike Flicker; Terry Gottlieb; Howard Leese; Ira Welsley

The Zoo was a 1960s rock band based in Los Angeles, California. Their music combined heavy soul music stylings with psychedelic rock influences. It consisted of guitarist Murphy "Chocolate Moose" Carfagna, drummer Mike Flicker, bassist Terry Gottlieb, guitarist Howard Leese, and vocalist Ira Welsley.

In 1968 the group signed a contract with Sunburst Records, a division of the Attarack Corporation. The members were still in their teens, and were among the youngest groups with a record contract at the time. Sunburst was distributed by Bell Records which later became Arista Records. The album had 10 songs and a later single contained two additional songs.

Flicker and Leese worked in the music industry in Vancouver, British Columbia in the 1970s. Flicker became a successful record producer, while Leese joined the group Heart.

The album was reissued in 1993 by Ace Records, in 2001 by Big Beat Records and in 2007 by Radioactive Records.

== Discography ==
- The Zoo Presents Chocolate Moose (1968)
