= Taking a Cold Look =

Studio album by i-TEN
- Released: July 18, 1983
- Recorded: 1983
- Studio: Goodnight L.A. Studios (Van Nuys)
- Genres: AOR; pop rock
- Length: 38:21
- Label: Epic
- Producers: Keith Olsen; Steve Lukather

Singles from Taking a Cold Look
- 1. "Taking a Cold Look" Released: July 1983; 2. "Lonely in Each Other's Arms" Released: October 1983

Taking a Cold Look is the only studio album by i-TEN, a short-lived project formed of the songwriting duo Tom Kelly and Billy Steinberg, released in July 1983. Musicians on the album include Steve Lukather, David Paich, Steve Porcaro, and Lenny Castro of Toto and Richard Page of Pages and Mr. Mister. The album was reissued on CD in June 2000 by Rewind Records and then in February 2009 by Rock Candy.

== Reception ==
The album was reviewed in Billboard: "With such credentials [of Steinberg and Kelly] and with Fleetwood Mac's producer and members of Toto helping out, the musical direction of i-TEN can be easily discerned. And, of course, the level of professionalism here cannot be surpassed. But is this a good album? AC programmers would say, yes."

The title track, released as a single, was reviewed in Cash Box and was described as having "stand-out production from pro Olsen and Toto-er Lukather. The side's dramatic reading and impressive guitar work give the group an edge in the late summer’s pop/rock derby."

The album has since been described as a "prime example of early '80s AOR, one needs look no further. Featuring trademark ’80s polish and sheen with catchy hooks that would not have sounded out of place on an album by Survivor, REO or even Styx, I-Ten’s Taking a Cold Look isn’t merely a time capsule of that era. It’s a clinic on why music of that era was so popular."

== Covers ==
The most-known cover is the 1987 version of "Alone" by Heart for their album Bad Animals, which topped the Billboard charts. A cover by Celine Dion in 2008 from her album Taking Chances also achieved chart success. The title track was covered by Honeymoon Suite, titled "Cold Look", for their 1988 album Racing After Midnight. "The Easy Way Out" was covered by Juice Newton in 1984 and by Jack Wagner in 1987. "I Don't Wanna Lose You" was covered by REO Speedwagon in 1988 for their compilation album The Hits.

== Track listing ==
All tracks are written by Tom Kelly and Billy Steinberg except where noted.

Side one
No.	Title	Writer(s)	Length
1.	"Taking a Cold Look"		3:54
2.	"Quicksand"		3:58
3.	"Alone"		3:58
4.	"Workin' for a Lovin'"		3:18
5.	"Lonely in Each Other's Arms"	Kelly; Steinberg; Alan Pasqua	4:57

Side two
No.	Title	Writer(s)	Length
6.	"I Don't Want to Lose You"		3:16
7.	"Time to Say Goodbye"		4:02
8.	"The Easy Way Out"		3:30
9.	"I've Been Crying"	Kelly; Steinberg; Pasqua; Steve Lukather	3:45
10.	"Pressing My Luck"		3:43
Total length:			38:21

== Personnel ==
Credits adapted from the album's liner notes.

=== Musicians ===
- Tom Kelly – vocals, guitar, keyboards
- Billy Steinberg – vocals, guitar
- Steve Lukather – guitars, keyboards, synthesizers
- Chas Sandford – rhythm guitar
- Alan Pasqua – keyboards, synthesizers
- David Paich – keyboards, synthesizers
- Steve Porcaro – synthesizers, programming
- Peggy Sandvig – synthesizers (7)
- Dennis Belfield – bass
- Mike Baird – drums, percussion
- Lenny Castro – percussion (5)
- Richard Page – backing vocals

=== Technical ===
- Produced and arranged by Keith Olsen and Steve Lukather
- Engineered by Keith Olsen and Dennis Sager
- Mastered by Greg Fulginiti
- Art direction – John Kosh
- Design – Ron Larson
- Illustration – Andy Engel
- Management – John Baruck

==== Reissues ====
- Remastering – Jeff Willens (2000) and Jon Astley (2009)
- Producer – Tom Laskey
- Reissue preparation – Dane Spencer
- Design – Curt Evans
- Archive photos – Billy Steinberg
