= Brother (Alice in Chains song) =

1992 song by Alice in Chains

Song by Alice in Chains

from the EP Sap
- Released: February 4, 1992
- Recorded: November 1991
- Studio: London Bridge, Seattle, Washington
- Genre: Folk rock
- Length: 4:27
- Label: Columbia
- Songwriter: Jerry Cantrell
- Producers: Alice in Chains and Rick Parashar

"Brother" is a song by the American rock band Alice in Chains and the opening track on their 1992 acoustic EP Sap. The song was written by guitarist and vocalist Jerry Cantrell for his younger brother, David. Cantrell sings lead vocals in the song, while Heart lead vocalist Ann Wilson sings backing vocals. An acoustic version performed on Alice in Chains' MTV Unplugged in 1996 was released in a live album and DVD. The song was included on the compilation albums Music Bank (1999) and The Essential Alice in Chains (2006).

== Origin ==
In the liner notes of 1999's Music Bank box set collection, Jerry Cantrell said of the song:

Ours was a divorced family, I was the older brother and we had a sister Cheri in the middle. As you know, when you're a kid there's no way you wanna hang out with your four-year-younger brother. You'll take care of the guy if someone's trying to kick his ass, but other than that you don't wanna know. I think I was really hard on him, especially without my father around. David had nobody, he split to live with my Dad and we didn't see much of each other for a good 6 or 7 years. That song was about the time we were apart, and like "Rooster" was my dad, it was a way of trying to build a bridge.

== Reception ==
Dead End Follies detailed the song to be an "eerie ballad", while opining "its simplicity and spontaneity" to be "100% folk rock".

== Live performances ==
Alice in Chains performed "Brother" for the first time during a concert at the Hollywood Palladium in Los Angeles on July 25, 1992.

The band performed an acoustic version of "Brother" for its appearance on MTV Unplugged in 1996, with Layne Staley singing co-lead vocals, and the song was included on the Unplugged live album and home video release. This was the last time the band performed the song with Staley.

During his solo concert at the Key Arena in Seattle on May 18, 2002, Jerry Cantrell said to the audience: "I'd like to do something for a good friend of ours who's no longer with us", and played Alice in Chains' song "Down in a Hole". Cantrell later introduced Ann and Nancy Wilson from the band Heart, who joined him on guitar and vocals to perform "Brother", another song that Cantrell dedicated to Staley at the concert saying; "one more for Mr. Layne". Staley had died a month before the concert, on April 5, 2002.

== Personnel ==
- Jerry Cantrell – lead vocals, guitar
- Ann Wilson – backing vocals
- Michael Starr – bass
- Sean Kinney – drums, percussion
