= Secret (Heart song) =

Single by Heart

from the album Brigade
- B-side: "I Love You"
- Released: 1990
- Genre: Rock
- Length: 4:10
- Label: Capitol
- Songwriters: Franne Golde; Bruce Roberts
- Producer: Richie Zito

Heart singles chronology
"Stranded" (1990)	"Secret" (1990)	"You're the Voice" (1991)

"Secret" is a song recorded by American rock band Heart, released in 1990 by Capitol Records as the fourth and final single from the band's tenth studio album, Brigade (1990). The track is a power ballad which did not meet with much mainstream success, peaking at number 64 on the US Billboard Hot 100, number 41 on the US Cash Box Top 100 and number seventy-nine on the UK Singles Chart. The accompanying music video documents the Japanese leg of the Brigade Tour.

== Charts ==
Chart (1991)	Peak position
Canada Top Singles (RPM)	30
Poland (Polish Singles Chart)	26
UK Singles (OCC)	79
UK Airplay (Music Week)	21
US Billboard Hot 100	64
US Cash Box Top 100	41
