= Who Will You Run To =

Single by Heart

from the album Bad Animals
- B-side: "Magic Man (live)"
- Released: August 1987
- Genre: Rock
- Length: 4:05
- Label: Capitol
- Songwriter: Diane Warren
- Producer: Ron Nevison

Heart singles chronology
"Alone" (1987)	"Who Will You Run To" (1987)	"There's the Girl" (1987)

"Who Will You Run To" is a song recorded by American rock band Heart. It was composed by Diane Warren and released as a single from Heart's ninth studio album, Bad Animals.

"Who Will You Run To" is one of a long list of hit songs written by Warren. Heart's version of her song became the band's eighth U.S. top-ten single. It also climbed to number thirty in the UK Singles Chart, where it was also available as a 12" single. An extended rock version of the song was Heart's first UK CD single release.

Cash Box called it a "powerful melodic rocker."

== Charts ==
=== Weekly charts ===
Weekly chart performance for "Who Will You Run To"
Chart (1987)	Peak position
Australia (Kent Music Report)	63
Canada Top Singles (RPM)	19
Europe (European Hot 100 Singles)	78
Ireland (IRMA)	18
UK Singles (Official Charts)	30
US Billboard Hot 100	7
US Mainstream Rock (Billboard)	2
US Cash Box Top 100 Singles	6

=== Year-end charts ===
Year-end chart performance for "Who Will You Run To"
Chart (1987)	Position
US Billboard Hot 100	88
US Mainstream Rock (Billboard)	8
