= I Didn't Want to Need You =

1990 single by Heart

Single by Heart

from the album Brigade
- B-side: "The Night"
- Released: June 5, 1990
- Length: 4:05
- Label: Capitol
- Songwriter: Diane Warren
- Producer: Richie Zito

Heart singles chronology
"All I Wanna Do Is Make Love to You" (1990)	"I Didn't Want to Need You" (1990)	"Stranded" (1990)

"I Didn't Want to Need You" is a song by American rock band Heart. It was composed by veteran songwriter Diane Warren and released as the second single from the band's 10th studio album, Brigade (1990). "I Didn't Want to Need You" peaked at number 23 on the US Billboard Hot 100, number 21 on the US Cash Box Top 100 and number 14 on the Canadian RPM 100 Hit Tracks chart. It also reached the top 40 in Ireland and Sweden and number 47 on the UK Singles Chart.

== Music video ==
The majority of the video features close-up shots of the Wilson sisters blended with live shots of the band on the Brigade tour from their stop at the Orlando Arena in Orlando, Florida, on June 9, 1990 and the USF Sundome in Tampa, Florida on June 10, 1990.

== Track listings ==
7-inch, cassette, and mini-CD single

1. "I Didn't Want to Need You" – 4:05
2. "The Night" – 4:50

12-inch and CD single

1. "I Didn't Want to Need You" – 4:05
2. "The Night" – 4:50
3. "The Will to Love" – 4:19
- A limited-edition 12-inch vinyl with a poster sleeve was also issued in the UK.

== Charts ==
Chart (1990)	Peak position
Australia (ARIA)	64
Canada Top Singles (RPM)	14
Europe (Eurochart Hot 100)	85
Ireland (IRMA)	14
Netherlands (Single Top 100)	60
Sweden (Sverigetopplistan)	15
UK Singles (Official Charts)	47
US Billboard Hot 100	23
US Mainstream Rock (Billboard)	13
US Cash Box Top 100	21

== Release history ==
Region	Date	Format(s)	Label(s)	Ref.
Europe	June 5, 1990	7-inch vinyl	Capitol	
United Kingdom	July 2, 1990	7-inch vinyl; 12-inch vinyl; CD; cassette	Capitol	
Australia	July 16, 1990	7-inch vinyl; cassette	Capitol	
Japan	August 10, 1990	Mini-CD	Capitol	
