= Dog & Butterfly (song) =

Single by Heart

from the album Dog & Butterfly
- B-side: "Mistral Wind"
- Released: January 1979
- Recorded: 1978
- Genre: Folk rock; soft rock; acoustic
- Length: 4:48 (single version); 5:21 (album version)
- Label: Portrait
- Songwriters: Ann Wilson; Nancy Wilson; Sue Ennis
- Producer: Mike Flicker

Heart singles chronology
"Straight On" (1978)	"Dog & Butterfly" (1979)	"Even It Up" (1980)

"Dog & Butterfly" is a song recorded by the rock band Heart. It is the title track to the band's fourth studio album Dog & Butterfly and was released as the album's second single.

== Description and origin ==
The song is a more subdued effort from the band, differing from past hard rock-oriented hits, as Ann and Nancy Wilson pulled from their folk music influences. The song charted moderately in the US in 1979, peaking at #34 on the Billboard Hot 100.

Ann has said she was inspired when she looked out a window and saw a dog relentlessly chasing a butterfly. She saw the song as an inspiration when things get tough to "keep going after it."

Cash Box called it a "gentle acoustic ballad which rides a melodic verse and acoustic guitar and easy beat backing." Record World called it a "a light romantic ballad that should suit adult and pop playlists."

Although it enjoyed only moderate chart success, the song has remained a setlist staple for Heart consistently through the years.

== Personnel ==
Credits adapted from the liner notes of Dog & Butterfly.

- Ann Wilson – lead vocals, chimes
- Nancy Wilson – acoustic guitars (6 & 12-string), background vocals
- Howard Leese – piano
- Steve Fossen – bass
- Michael Derosier – drums

== Chart performance ==
Chart (1979)	Peak position
Canada RPM Top Singles	51
Canada RPM Adult Contemporary	36
U.S. Billboard Hot 100	34
U.S. Billboard Adult Contemporary	33
U.S. Cash Box Top 100	31
