= Little Queen (song) =

Single by Heart

from the album Little Queen
- B-side: "Treat Me Well"
- Released: August 1977 (US)
- Recorded: 1977
- Genre: Hard rock
- Length: 3:37 (single version); 5:13 (album version)
- Label: Portrait Records
- Songwriters: Ann Wilson; Nancy Wilson; Michael Derosier; Roger Fisher; Steve Fossen; Howard Leese
- Producer: Mike Flicker

Heart singles chronology
"Barracuda" (1977)	"Little Queen" (1977)	"Kick It Out" (1977)

"Little Queen" is a song written and recorded by the rock band Heart. It was released as the second single from the band's second album Little Queen in 1977. The song is a midtempo rock and roll number similar in style to Heart's past hit "Magic Man" but much gentler than the album's hard rock debut single, "Barracuda". Although the song has endured as a fan-favorite amongst Heart's audience, "Little Queen" did not perform as well as previous singles when released, peaking at number sixty-two on the U.S. Billboard Hot 100.

In concert, Heart performed "Little Queen" during the 1977-1980 tours before dropping for future tours. The band began performing it again off and on during their 2007 tour and has continued rotating it periodically during subsequent years.

== Reception ==
Cash Box said that it "makes smooth transitions from a funky beat to an expansive bridge of dreamy vocal choruses." Record World said that it "should continue [Heart's] success" from their previous single "Barracuda."

== Personnel ==
Credits adapted from the liner notes of Little Queen.

- Ann Wilson – lead vocals
- Nancy Wilson – acoustic guitar, backing vocals
- Roger Fisher – lead guitar
- Howard Leese – guitar, backing vocals
- Steve Fossen – bass
- Michael Derosier – drums

== Chart performance ==
Chart (1977)	Peak position
Canadian Singles Chart	58
U.S. Billboard Hot 100	62
