= Kick It Out (Heart song) =

Single by Heart

from the album Little Queen
- B-side: "Go on Cry"
- Released: October 1977 (US)
- Recorded: 1977
- Genre: Hard rock
- Length: 2:45
- Label: Portrait Records
- Songwriter(s): Ann Wilson
- Producer(s): Mike Flicker

Heart singles chronology
| "Little Queen" (1977) | "Kick It Out" (1977) | "Heartless" (1978) |

"Kick It Out" is a short, fast-tempo hard rock song recorded by American rock band Heart, written by Ann Wilson. It was released in October 1977 by Portrait Records as the third and final single from the band's second album, Little Queen (1977). When released the song did not perform as well as previous Heart singles, reaching number seventy-nine on the US Billboard Hot 100 and number sixty-seven on the US Cash Box Top 100.

Fellow Seattle band Foo Fighters played a version during a 2014 appearance on Late Show with David Letterman, with Ann and Nancy Wilson performing lead vocals and guitar respectively.

Cash Box called it "hard driving rock and roll" and said that it "benefits from thoughtful stylization on the part of each musician, as well as the energetic vocals of sassy Ann Wilson." Record World called it an "out-and-out" and said that "this single performs just as the title promises."

== Personnel ==
Credits adapted from the liner notes of Little Queen.

- Ann Wilson – lead vocals
- Nancy Wilson – piano, acoustic guitar, backing vocals
- Roger Fisher – lead guitar
- Howard Leese – electric guitar
- Steve Fossen – bass
- Michael Derosier – drums

== Charts ==
| Chart (1977) | Peak position |
|---|---|
| Canada Top Singles (RPM) | 67 |
| US Billboard Hot 100 | 79 |
| US Cash Box Top 100 | 67 |
