= Alone (i-Ten song) =

1983 song by i-Ten

Song by i-Ten

from the album Taking a Cold Look
- Released: June 1983
- Recorded: 1983
- Studio: Goodnight L.A. (Van Nuys)
- Genre: Rock; arena rock
- Length: 3:58
- Label: Epic
- Songwriters: Billy Steinberg; Tom Kelly
- Producers: Keith Olsen; Steve Lukather

"Alone" is a song written by Billy Steinberg and Tom Kelly, who recorded it under the name i‑Ten for their 1983 album Taking a Cold Look. It was later recorded by actress Valerie Stevenson and actor John Stamos for the original soundtrack of the CBS sitcom Dreams in 1984. American rock band Heart recorded the song for their 1987 album Bad Animals, and their version reached number one in the United States and Canada. In 2007, Celine Dion recorded it for her album Taking Chances. In 2010, Alyssa Reid used the music and lyrics for the chorus of her song "Alone Again".

== Background ==
"Alone" is a rock ballad written by Billy Steinberg and Tom Kelly, who recorded it under the name i‑Ten for their 1983 album Taking a Cold Look. It appears as the third track on the album. The release attracted little attention, and i‑Ten did not record any further albums before disbanding.

== Personnel ==
- Tom Kelly – vocals
- Billy Steinberg – vocals, guitar
- Steve Lukather – guitar
- Alan Pasqua – piano
- Mike Baird – drums

== Dreams version ==
In late 1984, actress Valerie Stevenson and actor John Stamos recorded the song for the CBS sitcom Dreams in their roles as Lisa Copley and Gino Minnelli. It appears in the episode of the same name, in which the band perform the song for Frank and Louise's anniversary party. It is the earliest cover of the song. In the episode, Frank and Gino write a poem and develop it into a song. The episode aired on November 7, 1984. The song was released as a single on the same day, but it did not chart.

== Heart version ==
"Alone"

Single by Heart

from the album Bad Animals
- B-side: "Barracuda" (live)
- Released: May 15, 1987 (Europe)
- Recorded: 1987
- Genre: Soft rock
- Length: 3:39
- Label: Capitol
- Songwriters: Billy Steinberg; Tom Kelly
- Producer: Ron Nevison

Heart singles chronology
"If Looks Could Kill" (1986)	"Alone" (1987)	"Who Will You Run To" (1987)

Music video
- "Alone" on YouTube

Heart released the song as the lead single from their ninth studio album, Bad Animals, on May 16, 1987. Their recording is a power ballad that opens with a piano introduction and a restrained vocal by Ann Wilson, building into a synth‑driven hard‑rock chorus. Tom Kelly, the song's co‑writer and an experienced session vocalist, provided the high harmony parts on the track.

"Alone" reached number one on both the US Billboard Hot 100 and the US Cash Box Top 100. It peaked at number three on the UK Singles Chart. Internationally, it topped the chart in Canada, reached the top five in Ireland, Norway, and Switzerland, the top 10 in Australia, Belgium, and the Netherlands, and the top 20 in West Germany. An unplugged version later appeared on Heart's 1995 album The Road Home. An extended 5:30 version was issued on the Japanese 3‑inch CD of the album's third single, "There's the Girl".

Cash Box described the track as "a potent, emotion‑drenched rock ballad that features Ann Wilson's signature billowing, riveting vocal performance". The song earned Heart a nomination for the Grammy Award for Best Pop Vocal Performance by a Duo or Group at the 30th Annual Grammy Awards.

=== Music video ===
The music video, directed by Marty Callner, was released in June 1987. It begins with Ann standing on a balcony singing to Nancy below on stage playing the piano, echoing the Romeo and Juliet balcony scene. Ann then appears dressed entirely in black, including a veil and gown. The sisters are shown performing the chorus on stage, where Nancy's piano collapses at the first impact of the chorus. During the second verse, Nancy plays a piano placed within a deteriorated set. She is later shown riding a black horse. Ann appears again in the all‑black outfit within the broken set, before the video cuts back to the stage performance for the song's climax. As the track fades, Ann and Nancy face each other, followed by a final close‑up of Ann before the screen goes dark.

=== Charts ===
==== Weekly charts ====
Weekly chart performance
Chart (1987)	Peak position
Australia (KMR)	6
Austria (Ö3 Austria Top 40)	22
Belgium (Ultratop 50 Flanders)	8
Canada Retail Singles (The Record)	1
Canada Top Singles (RPM)	1
Canada Adult Contemporary (RPM)	1
Europe (European Hot 100 Singles)	9
Ireland (IRMA)	3
Netherlands (Dutch Top 40)	6
Netherlands (Single Top 100)	6
Norway (VG-lista)	5
Switzerland (Schweizer Hitparade)	4
UK Singles (Official Charts)	3
US Billboard Hot 100	1
US Adult Contemporary (Billboard)	2
US Mainstream Rock Airplay (Billboard)	3
US Cash Box Top 100	1
West Germany (GfK)	18

==== Year-end charts ====
Year-end chart performance
Chart (1987)	Position
Australia (KMR)	37
Belgium (Ultratop 50 Flanders)	62
Canada Top Singles (RPM)	11
European Top 100 Singles (Music & Media)	48
Netherlands (Dutch Top 40)	56
Netherlands (Single Top 100)	52
Norway Summer Period (VG-lista)	9
Switzerland (Schweizer Hitparade)	18
UK Singles (OCC)	34
US Billboard Hot 100	2
US Cash Box Top 100	9
US Adult Contemporary (Billboard)	23

=== Certifications ===
Certifications
Region	Certification	Certified units/sales
Brazil (Pro-Música Brasil)	Gold	30,000^{‡}
Canada (Music Canada)	Gold	50,000^{^}
Denmark (IFPI Danmark)	Gold	45,000^{‡}
New Zealand (RMNZ)	Platinum	30,000^{‡}
United Kingdom (BPI)	Platinum	600,000^{‡}
^{^} Shipments figures based on certification alone.^{‡} Sales+streaming figures based on certification alone.

== Celine Dion version ==
"Alone"

Single by Celine Dion

from the album Taking Chances
- Released: May 5, 2008
- Studio: At the Palms (Las Vegas); Conway
- Genre: Pop rock
- Length: 3:23
- Label: Columbia
- Songwriters: Billy Steinberg; Tom Kelly
- Producer: Ben Moody

Celine Dion singles chronology
"The Prayer" (2008)	"Alone" (2008)	"My Love" (2008)

Audio
- "Alone" on YouTube

Celine Dion recorded "Alone" for her tenth English‑language studio album, Taking Chances (2007). Issued as the second single in Europe and North America, and as the third in the United Kingdom in 2008, the track was produced by Ben Moody, former member of Evanescence. Dion's version received generally positive reviews and charted in several countries, including Canada, the United Kingdom, and Sweden.

=== Background and release ===
Dion recorded "Alone" in 2007 for Taking Chances, with production by Ben Moody, previously of Evanescence. Her recording incorporates piano and string arrangements. It was released as the second single in Europe and North America, and as the third in the United Kingdom. The UK digital release on May 5, 2008, coincided with the British leg of the Taking Chances World Tour. In October 2008, "Alone" was included on the European edition of My Love: Essential Collection. A live version appears on Taking Chances World Tour: The Concert.

=== Critical reception ===
"Alone" received generally positive reviews, with several critics praising Dion's vocal performance and the song's melodic appeal. Stephen Thomas Erlewine of AllMusic named it one of the album's standout tracks, praising Dion's energetic interpretation of Heart's original and noting the song's pronounced stylistic shifts. Sarah Rodman of The Boston Globe described the performance as a "great vocal, terrific melody, a fine rendition", while observing that the song remains closely associated with Heart's Ann Wilson. Toronto Star editor Ashante Infantry called the track "sentimental", and Chuck Taylor of Billboard described it as "a rowdy cover".

=== Commercial performance ===
"Alone" debuted at number 85 on the UK Singles Chart and remained for two weeks. It sold 12,535 copies in the United States, entering the Bubbling Under Hot 100 Singles at number 24 and the Canadian Hot 100 at number 57. It also entered the Swedish Singles Chart due to digital sales, peaking at number 52.

=== Music video and live performances ===
The music video was taken from Dion's CBS TV special That's Just the Woman in Me and released on March 15, 2008. Dion promoted the song in France on Star Academy. On November 23, 2007, she appeared on The View to perform "Taking Chances" and "Alone". She performed the song during most dates of the Taking Chances World Tour, and the performance appears on Taking Chances World Tour: The Concert.

=== Charts ===
==== Weekly charts ====
Weekly chart performance
Chart (2007–2008)	Peak position
Canada Hot 100 (Billboard)	57
Canada AC (Billboard)	7
CIS Airplay (TopHit)	185
Norway (VG-lista Airplay)	37
Quebec Radio Songs (ADISQ)	5
Sweden (Sverigetopplistan)	52
UK Singles (Official Charts)	85
US Bubbling Under Hot 100 (Billboard)	24
US Digital Song Sales (Billboard)	81
US Pop 100 (Billboard)	86
US Adult Contemporary (Radio & Records)	32

==== Year-end charts ====
Year-end chart performance
Chart (2008)	Position
Canada AC (Billboard)	20

=== Certifications ===
Certifications
Region	Certification	Certified units/sales
Canada (Music Canada)	Gold	40,000^{‡}
^{‡} Sales+streaming figures based on certification alone.

=== Release history ===
Release history
Region	Date	Format	Label	Ref.
United States	March 12, 2008	Adult Contemporary radio	Columbia	
United Kingdom	May 5, 2008	Digital download	Columbia	
