= Stranded (Heart song) =

1990 single by Heart

Single by Heart

from the album Brigade
- B-side: "Under the Sky"; "The Will to Love"; "Cruel Tears"
- Released: September 1990
- Length: 3:55
- Label: Capitol
- Songwriters: Jaime Kyle; Jeff Harrington
- Producer: Richie Zito

Heart singles chronology
"I Didn't Want to Need You" (1990)	"Stranded" (1990)	"Secret" (1990)

"Stranded" is a song by American rock band Heart. It was released as the third single from the band's 10th studio album, Brigade (1990). It is a mid-tempo song that features Nancy Wilson on lead vocals. The song was released in the United States in September 1990 and in the United Kingdom two months later.

"Stranded" climbed to number 13 on the US Billboard Hot 100 and number 11 on the US Cash Box Top 100. It reached number one in Canada according to The Record and number two according to RPM. In the UK, two editions of the 12-inch single were released: the first came in a gatefold sleeve while the second was issued as a picture disc.

== Music video ==
The music video comes from the perspective of several scenes. In addition to footage from the Brigade Tour, the majority of the video featured Nancy walking alone on the bridge at night to sitting in the living room, and lying on a pile of leaves inside of an empty arena. Howard Leese makes an appearance in the night scene during the solo.

== Track listings ==
7-inch, cassette, and mini-CD single

1. "Stranded" – 3:55
2. "Under the Sky" – 2:51

US CD single

1. "Stranded"
2. "The Will to Love"
3. "Cruel Tears"

UK 12-inch and CD single

1. "Stranded" – 3:55
2. "Under the Sky" – 2:51
3. "(I'll) Never Stop Loving You" – 3:42
- A 12-inch picture disc format with the same track listing was also released in the UK.

== Charts ==
=== Weekly charts ===
Chart (1990)	Peak position
Australia (ARIA)	120
Canada Retail Singles (The Record)	1
Canada Top Singles (RPM)	2
Canada Adult Contemporary (RPM)	7
UK Singles (Official Charts)	60
US Billboard Hot 100	13
US Adult Contemporary (Billboard)	8
US Mainstream Rock (Billboard)	25
US Cash Box Top 100	11

=== Year-end charts ===
Chart (1990)	Position
Canada Top Singles (RPM)	26
Canada Adult Contemporary (RPM)	55

== Release history ==
Region	Date	Format(s)	Label(s)	Ref.
United States	September 1990	CD; cassette	Capitol	
Australia	October 1, 1990	7-inch vinyl; cassette	Capitol	
United Kingdom	November 5, 1990	7-inch vinyl; 12-inch vinyl; CD; cassette	Capitol	
United Kingdom	November 12, 1990	12-inch picture disc	Capitol	
Japan	January 30, 1991	Mini-CD	Capitol	
