= Little Queen =

Studio album by Heart
- Released: May 14, 1977
- Recorded: February–April 1977
- Studios: Kaye-Smith, Seattle, Washington
- Genres: Hard rock; folk rock
- Length: 39:00
- Label: Portrait
- Producer: Mike Flicker

Heart chronology
Magazine (1977)	Little Queen (1977)	Dog & Butterfly (1978)

Singles from Little Queen
- 1. "Barracuda" Released: May 1977; 2. "Little Queen" Released: August 1977; 3. "Kick It Out" Released: October 1977

Professional ratings
Review scores
Source	Rating
AllMusic	4.5/5 stars
PopMatters	Mixed
Rolling Stone	Mixed
The Rolling Stone Album Guide	3/5 stars

Little Queen is the third studio album by American rock band Heart, released in May 1977 by Portrait Records. The album was recorded and mixed at Kaye-Smith Studios in Seattle, Washington, from February to April 1977. On June 29, 2004, a remastered version of Little Queen was released by Epic Records and Legacy Recordings with two bonus tracks.

== Background ==
The group intended Magazine to be the official follow-up to their debut album Dreamboat Annie. However, a contract dispute with their label, Mushroom Records, resulted in the group signing with the newly formed Portrait Records, a division of CBS Records (now Sony BMG).

The Mushroom contract called for two albums, and the label took the position that they were owed a second one. On that basis, Mushroom attempted to prevent the release of Little Queen and any other work by Heart. They took the five unfinished tracks for Magazine and added a B-side and two live recordings. The first release of the album in April 1977 included a disclaimer on the back cover.

The court eventually decided that Heart was free to sign with a new label, but indeed owed Mushroom a second album. Therefore, Heart returned to the studio to re-record, remix, edit, and resequence the Magazine recordings in a marathon session over four days. A court-ordered guard stood nearby to prevent the master tapes from being erased.

Little Queen was released on May 14, 1977, and the reworked version of Magazine entered the Billboard chart on April 22, 1978. With the successful single "Barracuda", Little Queen outsold Magazine handily, eventually earning a triple platinum certification from the Recording Industry Association of America (RIAA). However, the almost simultaneous 1977 releases also gave the band the distinction of having all three of their albums (Dreamboat Annie, Magazine, and Little Queen) on the charts at the same time.

=== "Barracuda" ===
After Dreamboat Annie became a million seller, Mushroom took out a full-page ad in the December 30, 1976, issue of Rolling Stone magazine touting the band's success, using the headline "Million to One Shot Sells a Million". The ad looked like the front page of the tabloid newspaper National Enquirer and included a photo from the Dreamboat Annie cover shoot. The caption read: "Heart's Wilson Sisters Confess: 'It Was Only Our First Time!'"

After this ad surfaced, a Detroit radio promoter asked Ann Wilson about her lover—referring to Nancy, thus implying that the sisters were incestuous lesbian lovers. Ann was outraged and retreated to her hotel room to write a song. When she relayed the incident to Nancy, she, too, was infuriated. Nancy joined Ann and contributed a melody and bridge. The song became "Barracuda", which entered Billboard Hot 100 on May 28, and peaked at number 11. and remains one of the band's signature songs.

== Track listing ==
Side one
No.	Title	Writer(s)	Length
1.	"Barracuda"	Ann Wilson; Roger Fisher; Nancy Wilson; Michael DeRosier	4:20
2.	"Love Alive"	A. Wilson; Fisher; N. Wilson	4:21
3.	"Sylvan Song"	N. Wilson; Fisher	2:12
4.	"Dream of the Archer"	A. Wilson; Fisher; N. Wilson	4:30
5.	"Kick It Out"	A. Wilson	2:44

Side two
No.	Title	Writer(s)	Length
6.	"Little Queen"	A. Wilson; N. Wilson; Fisher; DeRosier; Howard Leese; Steve Fossen	5:10
7.	"Treat Me Well"	N. Wilson	3:24
8.	"Say Hello"	A. Wilson; Fisher; N. Wilson	3:36
9.	"Cry to Me"	A. Wilson; N. Wilson	2:51
10.	"Go On Cry"	A. Wilson; Fisher; N. Wilson	5:52

2004 remastered reissue bonus tracks
No.	Title	Writer(s)	Length
11.	"Too Long a Time" (early demo version of "Love Alive")	A. Wilson; Fisher; N. Wilson	3:30
12.	"Stairway to Heaven" (live at the Aquarius Tavern, Seattle, WA, 1976)	Jimmy Page; Robert Plant	9:20

== Personnel ==
Credits adapted from the liner notes of Little Queen.

=== Heart ===
- Ann Wilson – lead vocals (tracks 1, 2, 4–6, 8–10); flute (track 2)
- Nancy Wilson – acoustic guitar (tracks 1, 2, 4, 6–9); autoharp (tracks 2, 4); vocals (tracks 2, 4, 5, 6, 8, 9); mandolin (tracks 3, 4); piano (track 5); electric guitar (tracks 7, 10); blues harp, lead vocals (track 7)
- Roger Fisher – lead guitar (tracks 1, 2, 5, 6, 10); mandolin (tracks 3, 4); electric guitar (tracks 8, 10)
- Howard Leese – lead guitar (track 1); Mellotron (tracks 1, 4); acoustic guitar, piano (track 2); vocals (tracks 2, 4, 6, 8, 10); Moog bass (tracks 3, 4); electric guitar (track 5); guitar (track 6); grand piano, string arrangements, string conducting (track 7); mandolin (track 8)
- Michael DeRosier – drums (tracks 1, 2, 5–8, 10); tabla (track 2); percussion (tracks 4, 8); timpani, chimes (track 10)
- Steve Fossen – bass (tracks 1, 2, 5–8, 10)

=== Additional musicians ===
- Lynn Wilson Keagle – vocals (tracks 9, 10)
- Seal Dunnington – vocals (tracks 9, 10)

=== Technical ===
- Mike Flicker – production, engineering
- Buzz Richmond – engineering
- Winslow Kutz – engineering
- Mike Fisher – special direction

=== Artwork ===
- Heart – cover concept
- Mike Doud – art direction
- Marilyn Romen – art direction
- John Kehe – design
- Bob Seidemann – photography

== Charts ==
=== Weekly charts ===
Chart (1977)	Peak position
Australian Albums (Kent Music Report)	22
Canada Top Albums/CDs (RPM)	2
Dutch Albums (Album Top 100)	9
German Albums (Offizielle Top 100)	34
Japanese Albums (Oricon)	67
Swedish Albums (Sverigetopplistan)	44
UK Albums (Official Charts)	34
US Billboard 200	9

=== Year-end charts ===
Chart (1977)	Position
Australian Albums (Kent Music Report)	58
Canada Top Albums/CDs (RPM)	15
US Billboard 200	46

== Certifications ==
Region	Certification	Certified units/sales
Canada (Music Canada)	2× Platinum	200,000^{^}
United States (RIAA)	3× Platinum	3,000,000^{^}
^{^} Shipments figures based on certification alone.
