= Dog & Butterfly (album) =

1978 studio album by Heart

- 2004 CD reissue cover (Note: The original album cover was a "double album"-style fold-out cover, with the original illustration encompassing both the front and back of the cover. The dog that appears on the 2004 CD reissue was not visible on the front of the original cover. It was, however, on the back cover, and when folded out, the entire illustration includes both the dog and the butterfly.)

Studio album by Heart
- Released: September 1978
- Studios: Sea-West (Seattle); Capitol (Hollywood) (Note: Strings on "Lighter Touch" and "Nada One")
- Genres: Hard rock; folk rock
- Length: 39:26
- Label: Portrait
- Producers: Mike Flicker; Heart; Michael Fisher

Heart chronology
Little Queen (1977)	Dog & Butterfly (1978)	Bébé le Strange (1980)

Singles from Dog & Butterfly
- 1. "Straight On" Released: September 1978; 2. "Dog & Butterfly" Released: January 1979

Professional ratings
Review scores
Source	Rating
AllMusic	3.5/5 stars
Christgau's Record Guide	C
PopMatters	Unfavorable
Rolling Stone	Favorable
The Rolling Stone Album Guide	2.5/5 stars

Dog & Butterfly is the fourth studio album by American rock band Heart, released in September 1978, by Portrait Records, following a legal dispute with Mushroom Records over the release of the band's second studio album, Magazine, in April 1978. Dog & Butterfly peaked at number 17 on the US Billboard 200 and has been certified double platinum by the Recording Industry Association of America (RIAA). The album spawned the singles "Straight On" and "Dog & Butterfly".

As Heart themselves noted on the album's release, side one was the Dog side, and was the more "rocking" compared to the Butterfly side two, which consisted mostly of ballads, with the exception of the closer "Mistral Wind".

Though the first song, "Cook with Fire", sounds like a live recording, the liner notes to the 2004 CD reissue state that it was actually recorded at Sea-West Studios along with the rest of the album. Audience sounds from a live performance were overdubbed on the studio recording.

On June 29, 2004, the album was reissued by Epic Records and Legacy Recordings in a remastered edition, containing three bonus tracks. One of the songs, "Feels", was later reworked and became "Johnny Moon", included on the band's seventh studio album, Passionworks (1983).

== Track listing ==
All tracks are written by Ann Wilson, Nancy Wilson, and Sue Ennis, except where noted.

Side one: Dog
No.	Title	Writer(s)	Length
1.	"Cook with Fire"	A. Wilson; N. Wilson; Roger Fisher; Ennis; Howard Leese	4:57
2.	"High Time"		3:21
3.	"Hijinx"		3:30
4.	"Straight On"		5:09

Side two: Butterfly
No.	Title	Writer(s)	Length
5.	"Dog & Butterfly"		5:21
6.	"Lighter Touch"		5:03
7.	"Nada One"		5:23
8.	"Mistral Wind"	A. Wilson; N. Wilson; Ennis; Fisher	6:42
Total length:			39:26

2004 remastered reissue bonus tracks
No.	Title	Writer(s)	Length
9.	"Heartless" (live from BBC concert)	A. Wilson; N. Wilson	5:00
10.	"Feels"		4:53
11.	"A Little Bit"	N. Wilson	0:49
Total length:			50:08

== Personnel ==
Credits adapted from the liner notes of Dog & Butterfly.

=== Heart ===
- Ann Wilson – lead vocals (tracks 1–6, 8); chimes (track 5); piano (track 6); background vocals (track 7)
- Nancy Wilson – blues harp (track 1); acoustic guitar (tracks 2, 4, 7, 8); background vocals (tracks 2, 5); "Hijinx" guitar, "Who's Who" vocals (track 3); acoustic guitar (6- and 12-string) (tracks 5, 6); lead vocals (track 7)
- Roger Fisher – electric guitar (tracks 1, 2, 4, 8); lead guitar (track 3); Zohn (track 8)
- Howard Leese – electric guitar (tracks 1, 2, 4, 6); mridangam African conga (track 1); background vocals (tracks 2, 7); electric piano (tracks 3, 8); "Who's Who" vocals (track 3); piano (track 5); Avatar (track 6); orchestral arrangement, conducting (tracks 6, 7); acoustic piano, Moog (track 8)
- Steve Fossen – bass (tracks 1, 3–8); dholak Indian drum (track 1)
- Michael Derosier – drums (tracks 1–4, 6–8); chimes (track 8)

=== Additional musicians ===
- Dick Adams – introduction (track 1)
- Sue Ennis – fun machine (track 7)

=== Technical ===
- Mike Flicker – production, engineering
- Heart – production
- Michael Fisher – production
- Rick Keefer – engineering
- T.J. Landon – engineering assistance
- Terry Gottlieb – engineering assistance
- Armin Steiner – strings engineering
- John Golden – mastering at Kendun Recorders (Burbank, California)

=== Artwork ===
- Mike Doud – art direction, design
- Fu-Tung Cheng – illustration
- Philip Chiang – design
- Gary Heery – photography

== Charts ==
=== Weekly charts ===
Weekly chart performance for Dog & Butterfly
Chart (1978–1979)	Peak position
Australian Albums (Kent Music Report)	48
Canada Top Albums/CDs (RPM)	9
Dutch Albums (Album Top 100)	46
Japanese Albums (Oricon)	67
US Billboard 200	17

=== Year-end charts ===
Year-end chart performance for Dog & Butterfly
Chart (1979)	Position
Canada Top Albums/CDs (RPM)	54
US Billboard 200	32

== Certifications ==
Certifications for Dog & Butterfly
Region	Certification	Certified units/sales
Canada (Music Canada)	Platinum	100,000^{^}
United States (RIAA)	2× Platinum	2,000,000^{^}
^{^} Shipments figures based on certification alone.
