= Tom Kelly (musician) =

American musician, songwriter

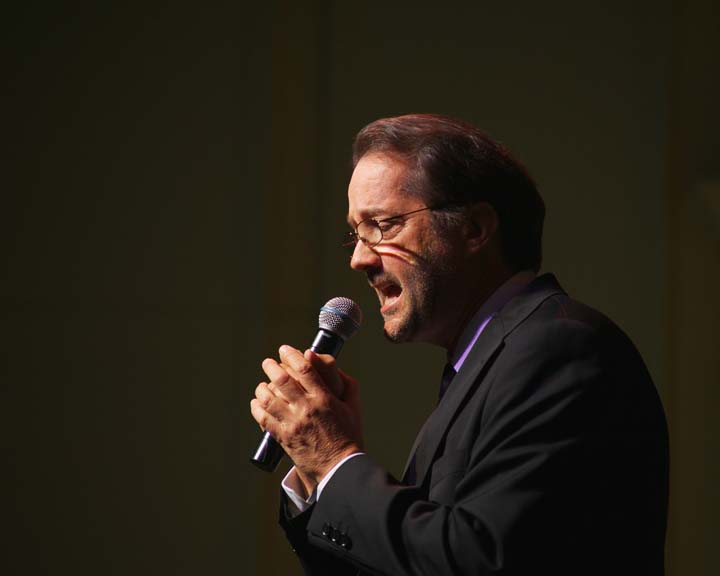
- Performing at the 2011 ASCAP concert

Background information
- Born: April 16, 1952 (age 74); Indiana, U.S.
- Occupations: Songwriter; musician

Thomas F. Kelly (born April 16, 1952) is an American musician. With Billy Steinberg, he co-wrote numerous hit songs for popular music artists, including five number-one singles on the Billboard Hot 100 chart in the 1980s.

== Early life and education ==
Originally from Indiana, Thomas F. Kelly lived in Effingham, Illinois, from 1963 to 1966, before moving back to West Lafayette, Indiana, where he graduated from West Lafayette High School in 1967. Kelly attended Eastern Illinois University, Southern Illinois University Carbondale, and Purdue University, but dropped out of college to pursue his music career.

== Career ==
=== Performing ===
Kelly played bass guitar and sang in several bands throughout Illinois and Indiana in the late 1960s and early 1970s, including the Trifaris, the Gaping Huggers, the One Eyed Jacks, and the Guild.

In 1974 Kelly moved to Los Angeles. He played in Dan Fogelberg's backup band, and joined with other members of the band under the name 'Fools Gold' to release two albums in 1976 and 1977. Kelly became a prominent session singer in Los Angeles, singing backing vocals for many recording artists. He accompanied Toto on their 1979 tour as a guitarist, and sang background vocals on the Toto albums Toto IV, Isolation, and The Seventh One.

=== Songwriting ===
In 1981 Kelly wrote his first hit song, "Fire and Ice", with Pat Benatar for her album Precious Time.

After Kelly met Billy Steinberg at a party in 1981, the duo began writing songs together, with Steinberg as lyricist and Kelly the principal music writer. Steinberg and Kelly wrote songs for a variety of popular music artists, including five number-one singles on the Billboard Hot 100 chart. The pair also joined together as i-Ten to release the album Taking a Cold Look in 1983.

Songs written by Kelly and Steinberg include:

- "True Colors", recorded by Cyndi Lauper and by Phil Collins
- "Alone", originally recorded by i-Ten, re-recorded by Heart and by Celine Dion
- "In Your Room", recorded by The Bangles (co-written with Susanna Hoffs)
- "Eternal Flame", recorded by The Bangles (co-written with Susanna Hoffs)
- "I Drove All Night", recorded by Cyndi Lauper, by Roy Orbison and by Celine Dion
- "I'll Stand by You", recorded by The Pretenders (co-written with Chrissie Hynde)
- "I Touch Myself", recorded by Divinyls (co-written with Christina Amphlett and Mark McEntee)
- "Like a Virgin", recorded by Madonna
- "So Emotional", recorded by Whitney Houston
- "Look Me in the Heart", recorded by Tina Turner
- "Listen to Your Heart", recorded by Little River Band
- "You Come to My Senses", recorded by Chicago
- "In My Dreams", recorded by REO Speedwagon (co-written with Kevin Cronin)

== Recognition ==
Steinberg and Kelly were inducted into the Songwriters Hall of Fame in 2011.

== Personal life ==
Kelly married and had two children late in life. He lost enthusiasm for songwriting in the mid-1990s and went into semi-retirement in 1998, moving to Thousand Oaks, California.

His son, Tyson Kelly, is also a musician, and played John Lennon in the tribute band The Bootleg Beatles as well as undertaking solo projects.
