= Ann Wilson =

American singer (born 1950)

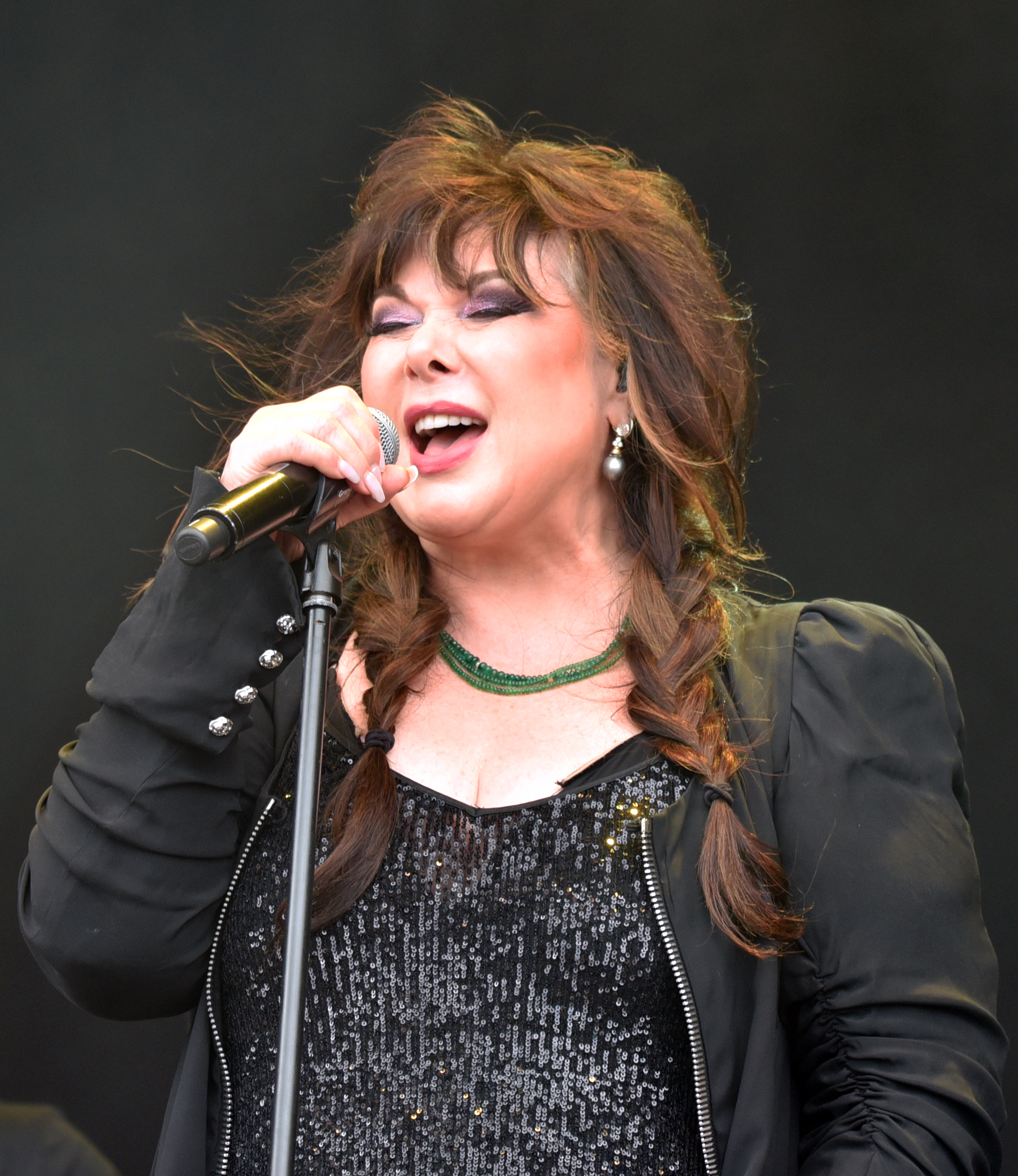
- Wilson at Wacken Open Air 2022

Background information
- Born: Ann Dustin Wilson; June 19, 1950 (age 76); San Diego, California, U.S.
- Origin: Seattle, Washington, U.S.
- Genres: Hard rock; folk rock; pop rock; arena rock
- Occupations: Singer; songwriter
- Instruments: Vocals; flute; guitar
- Years active: 1967–present
- Member of: Heart

Ann Dustin Wilson (born June 19, 1950) is an American singer best known as the lead singer of the rock band Heart.

Wilson has been a member of Heart since the early 1970s; her younger sister, Nancy Wilson, is also a member of the band. One of the first hard rock bands fronted by women, Heart released numerous albums between 1975 and 2016; the early Heart albums Dreamboat Annie (1975) and Little Queen (1977) generated US hit singles such as "Magic Man", "Crazy on You", and "Barracuda". Heart has sold over 35 million records worldwide, placed 29 singles on the Billboard Hot 100, and has scored top 10 albums on the Billboard 200 in the 1970s, 1980s, 1990s, and 2010s.

Wilson was ranked no. 78 in Hit Parader's 2006 list of "Greatest Metal Vocalists of All Time". In 2013, she was inducted into the Rock and Roll Hall of Fame as a member of Heart. She is known for her operatic abilities.

== Early life ==
Ann Dustin Wilson was born in San Diego, California. Her father was a major in the United States Marine Corps. Due to her father's military career, the Wilson family moved frequently. They lived near American military facilities in Panama and Taiwan before settling in Seattle, Washington, in the early 1960s. To maintain a sense of home no matter where in the world they were residing, the Wilsons turned to music. "On Sunday we'd have pancakes and opera," her sister Nancy Wilson recalled. "My dad would be conducting in the living room. We'd turn it way up and rock. There was everything from classical music to Ray Charles, Judy Garland, Peggy Lee, bossa nova, and early experimental electronic music."

Wilson's family eventually settled in Bellevue, Washington, a suburb of Seattle, Washington. In 1968, she graduated from Sammamish High School. Shy because of a stutter, Wilson sought fulfillment in music. In the early 1970s she joined a local band, White Heart, which changed its name to Hocus Pocus, and then in 1974 to Heart. Wilson also attended Cornish College of the Arts.

== Career ==
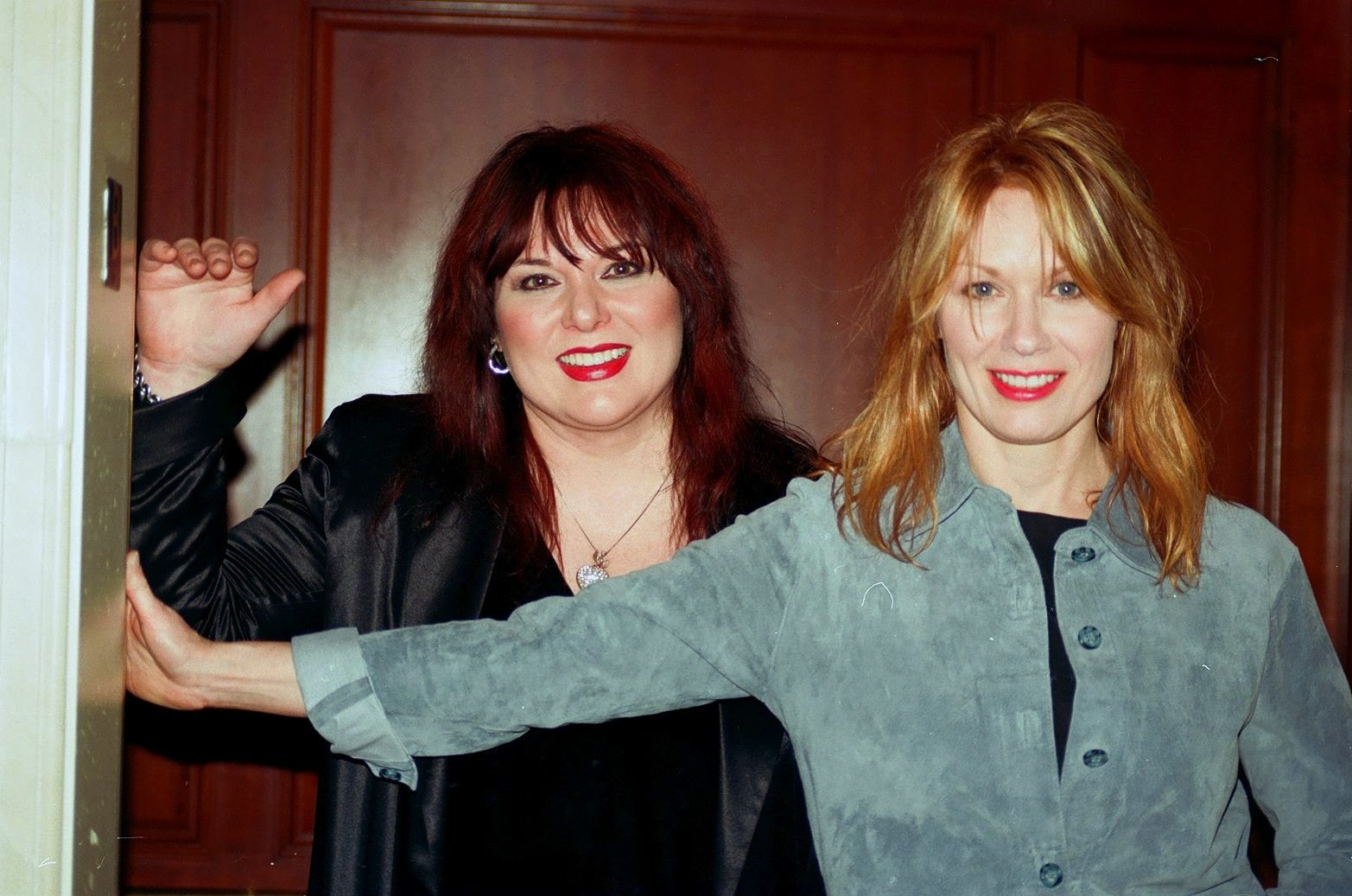
Ann and her sister Nancy in 1998

Wilson's younger sister, Nancy, joined Heart, and the band moved to Canada. Heart recorded their first album Dreamboat Annie in Vancouver in 1975. It was released in the United States in 1976, with "Magic Man" becoming Heart's first Top 10 hit in the United States, peaking at No. 9 on the Billboard Hot 100, and "Crazy on You" hitting number 35. Both songs were co-written by Ann and Nancy Wilson. In 1977, Little Queen was released, and in 1978, Dog & Butterfly. In 1986, "These Dreams" rose to No. 1 on the Billboard Hot 100. In 1992, Wilson appeared on Alice in Chains' EP Sap; she sang on "Brother" and "Am I Inside".

The Wilson sisters started a recording studio, Bad Animals, in Seattle in the mid-1980s. They formed a side band, the Lovemongers, which performed Led Zeppelin's song "The Battle of Evermore" on the 1992 soundtrack to the Cameron Crowe (Nancy's then husband) movie Singles, and later released a four-song EP. The Lovemongers' debut album Whirlygig was released in 1997.

Wilson joined producer Alan Parsons in A Walk Down Abbey Road, the 2001 live tribute tour to Beatles music.

Wilson's first solo album, Hope & Glory, was released on September 11, 2007. Hope & Glory features guest appearances from Elton John, k.d. lang, Alison Krauss, Gretchen Wilson, Shawn Colvin, Rufus Wainwright, Wynonna Judd, and Deana Carter. Nancy Wilson also contributed. Three singles were released from the project: "Little Problems, Little Lies", "Isolation", and a cover of Led Zeppelin's "Immigrant Song."

On November 22, 2012, Wilson sang an original arrangement of "The Star-Spangled Banner", accompanied by the Dallas Symphony Orchestra, at the beginning of the Thanksgiving Day football game between the Dallas Cowboys and Washington Redskins.

The Wilson sisters performed at the Kennedy Center tribute to Led Zeppelin on December 2, 2012. Present at the event were the three living members of Led Zeppelin, Robert Plant, Jimmy Page and John Paul Jones. The Wilsons performed "Stairway To Heaven", backed by an orchestra and choir, and featuring drummer Jason Bonham, son of the late Led Zeppelin drummer, John Bonham.

On July 13, 2015, Wilson announced a solo tour, The Ann Wilson Thing, which began on September 21. She released her first EP, The Ann Wilson Thing! – #1, digitally on September 18, 2015. On July 22, 2016, Wilson announced the release of focus, the second EP from The Ann Wilson Thing! Wilson played a Florida mini-tour in September 2016 as The Ann Wilson Thing! in support of this release.

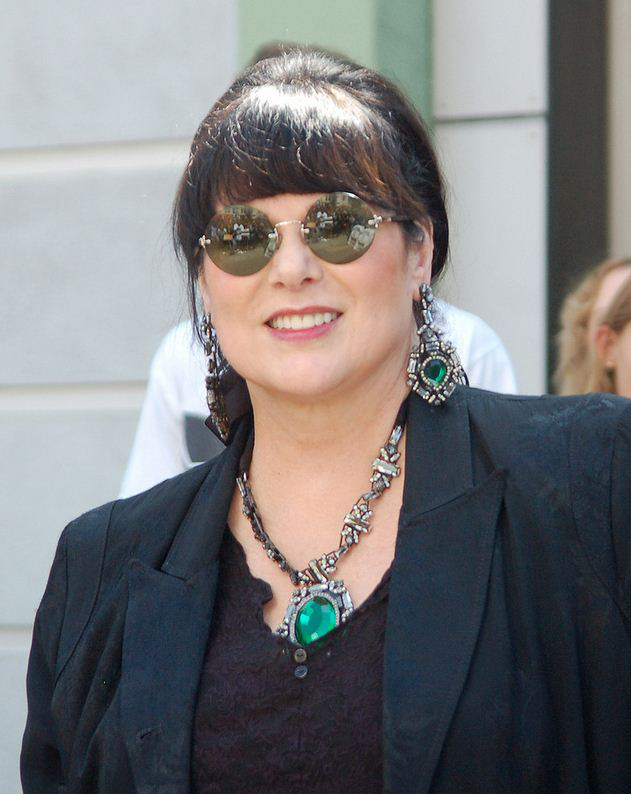
Wilson receiving a star on the Hollywood Walk of Fame, 2012

On October 12, 2017, Wilson's first feature film, Ann Wilson: In Focus was released. It featured an intimate interview conducted in her home by Criss Cain along with 20 complete live song performances from the Ann Wilson of Heart tour stop in Wilmington, North Carolina, on March 21, 2017.

Wilson and Alice in Chains' guitarist and vocalist Jerry Cantrell paid tribute to their late friend, Chris Cornell, with a rendition of Soundgarden's "Black Hole Sun" during the Rock and Roll Hall of Fame ceremony on April 14, 2018.

On August 3, 2018, Wilson released "You Don't Own Me" as the second single from her solo album, Immortal. Released on September 14, 2018, the album features ten tracks that pay tribute to Wilson's influences and friends.

In May 2021, Wilson announced her first dates since the COVID-19 pandemic with the Rite of June mini-tour.

In 2022, Wilson was nominated for consideration into the 2023 Songwriters Hall of Fame.

In November 2022, Wilson was featured on the Disturbed song "Don't Tell Me" from their album Divisive. The song reached number 2 on Billboard's Hard Rock Song Sales chart.

On April 25, 2024, Heart kicked off their Royal Flush 2024 Tour at the Seminole Hard Rock Hotel & Casino in Hollywood, Florida. The June and July 2024 dates of this tour, in the UK and Europe, were canceled in late May as the organizers informed that "In late May, Ann Wilson will undergo a time-sensitive but routine medical procedure for which the minimum recovery time is six weeks." The tour resumed on February 28, 2025.

== Personal life ==
=== Relationships and family ===
During the 1970s, Wilson was in a relationship with Michael Fisher, the manager of Heart, while Nancy was involved with lead guitarist Roger Fisher, Michael's younger brother. Both couples controlled the band. In 1979, the relationships ended; Wilson stated that Michael had fallen in love with another woman and they parted.

In 1991, Wilson adopted a daughter. In 1998, she adopted a son.

Wilson married Dean Wetter in April 2015. The pair had dated briefly in the 1980s. On the morning of August 27, 2016, Wetter was arrested for assaulting his nephews, Nancy Wilson's 16-year-old twin sons, after the boys had left the door to his RV open. The incident took place during a Heart performance at the White River Amphitheatre in Auburn, Washington the previous night. Wetter pleaded guilty to the charges. The sisters' relationship was strained by the incident. Following the end of Heart's 2016 tour, the sisters opted to tour with their own side-project bands, with Ann saying in April 2017 that Heart was on hiatus.

In February 2019, the sisters announced that Heart's hiatus had ended and that the band would embark on the Love Alive tour in the summer. In March 2019, at the Love Rocks NYC benefit concert, the sisters reunited on stage for the first time since the band went on hiatus.

=== Health ===
As a child, Wilson was bullied for being overweight. She revealed that in the 1970s and into the early 1980s she would starve herself and use diet pills to stay thin. By the time Heart made a comeback in the mid-'80s, she had gained a significant amount of weight. Fearing that Heart's lead singer's physique would compromise the band's image, record company executives and band members began pressuring her to lose weight. In music videos, camera angles and clothes were often used to minimize her size, and more focus was put on Wilson's more slender sister, Nancy. Wilson stated she began suffering from stress-related panic attacks due to the negative publicity surrounding her weight. She underwent adjustable gastric band weight-loss surgery in January 2002 after what she called "a lifelong battle" with her weight.

In the band's 2012 autobiography, Wilson revealed her past struggles with cocaine and alcoholism, stating that she had been sober since 2009.

In July 2024, it was announced that Wilson had been diagnosed with cancer. A tumor had been removed surgically, and Heart postponed touring until 2025 to allow her to undergo preventative chemotherapy. During the tour, Wilson has been performing in a wheelchair onstage as a result of her left arm being in a sling from a broken elbow.

== Discography ==
=== Studio albums ===
Year	Title	Notes	Ref.
2007	Hope & Glory	cover album	
2018	Immortal	cover album	
2022	Fierce Bliss	covers and originals	
2023	Another Door	With Tripsitter	
2026	Consecrated Ground	With Tripsitter	

=== Extended plays ===
Year	Title	Ref.
2015	The Ann Wilson Thing! #1	
2016	The Ann Wilson Thing! #2 - Focus	
2021	Sawheat 8	

=== Singles ===
Year	Title	Album	Notes	Ref.
1969	"Standin' Watchin' You" b/w "Wonder How I Managed"	non-album single	covers, with the Daybreaks	
1969	"Through Eyes and Glass" b/w "I'm Gonna' Drink My Hurt Away"	non-album single	original song b/w cover, with the Daybreaks	
2020	"The Revolution Starts Now!"	non-album single	cover	
2021	"Tender Heart"	non-album single	original song	
2021	"The Hammer"	non-album single	original song	
2021	"Black Wing"	Fierce Bliss	original song	
2022	"Greed"	Fierce Bliss	original song	

=== Other appearances ===
Year	Title	Album	Notes	Ref.
1984	"Almost Paradise"	Footloose	with Mike Reno	
1986	"The Best Man in the World"	The Golden Child	Original song	
1988	"Surrender to Me"	Tequila Sunrise	with Robin Zander	
1991	"Autumn to May"	For Our Children - To Benefit the Pediatric AIDS Foundation	with Nancy Wilson	
1992	"Am I Inside" and "Brother"	Sap	with Alice in Chains	
1992	"Blue Christmas"	A Very Special Christmas 2	with Nancy Wilson	
1993	"Auld Lang Syne"	Holiday Collection Volume III	Traditional song	
1995	"That's All Right"	Blue Suede Sneakers	Cover	
1996	"Jezebel"	Édith Piaf Tribute		
1998	"Sisters Are Doin' It for Themselves"	The Yellow Album	Cover, with the Simpsons	
2003	"Promise Her the Moon"	Influences and Connections: Volume I - Mr. Big	Cover	
2015	"Across the Universe"	Keep Calm and Salute the Beatles	Cover	
2022	"Don't Tell Me"	Divisive	with Disturbed	
2023	"Magic Man"	Rockstar	with Dolly Parton	

=== Live albums ===
Year	Title	Ref.
2016	Live at the Belly Up: The Ann Wilson Thing!	

=== Compilations ===
Year	Title	Notes	Ref.
2021	The Daybreaks	EP which compiles the two singles recorded with the Daybreaks	
