= K.d. lang discography =

k.d. lang discography
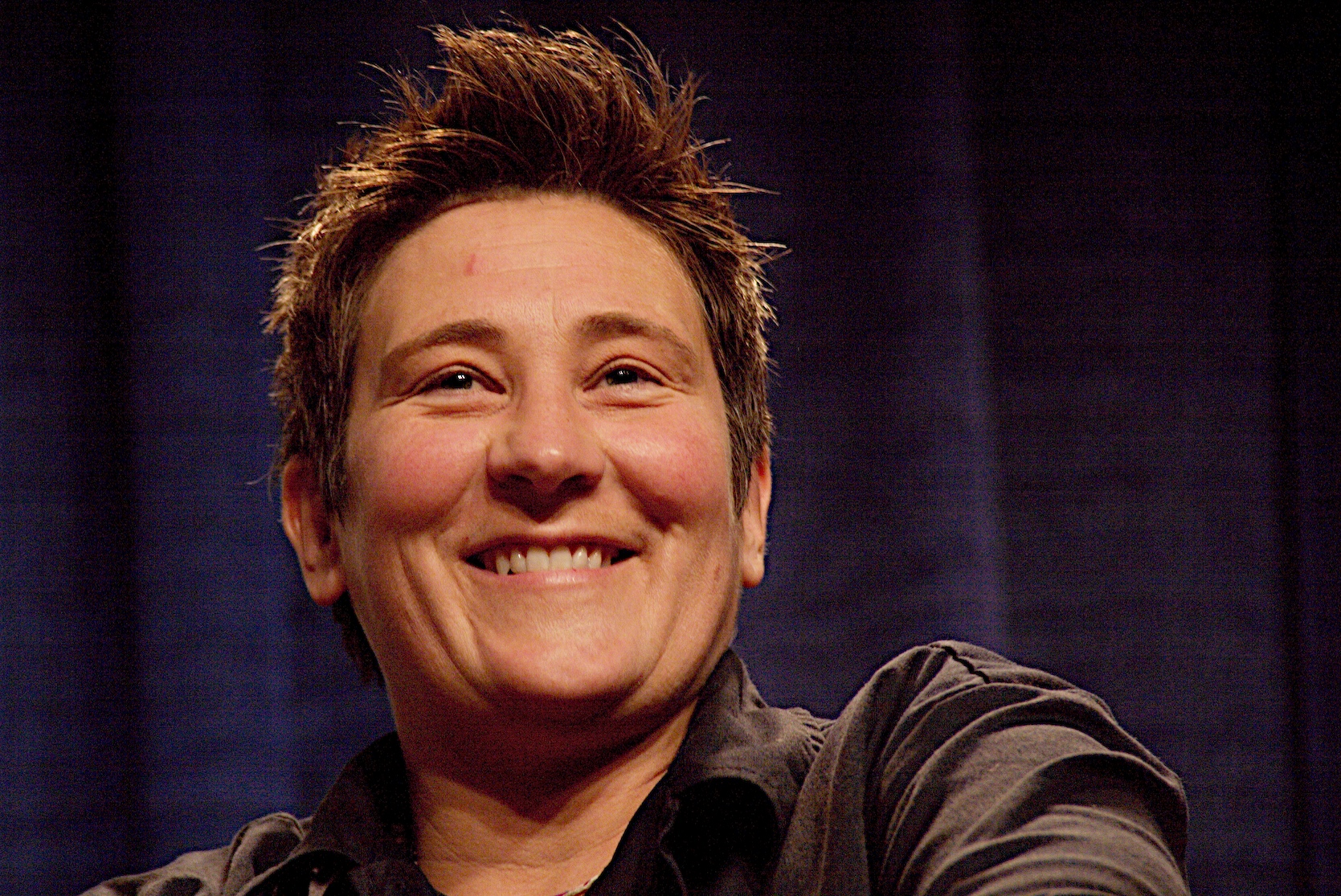
- k.d. lang in 2006
- Studio albums: 13
- Soundtrack albums: 1
- Live albums: 2
- Compilation albums: 4
- Singles: 42
- Video albums: 5
- Music videos: 12

k.d. lang is a Canadian singer and songwriter. Her discography comprises 12 studio albums, one soundtrack, one live album, four compilation albums and 41 singles.

== Albums ==
=== Studio albums ===
Title	Album details	Peak chart positions							Certifications (sales thresholds)
Title	Album details	CAN	CAN Country	AUS	NZ	UK	US	US Country	Certifications (sales thresholds)
Shadowland	Release date: April 26, 1988; Label: Sire, Warner Bros.	9	23	164	—	—	73	9	CAN: Platinum; AUS: Gold; UK: Silver; US: Gold
Ingénue	Release date: March 17, 1992; Label: Sire, Warner Bros.	13	—	3	1	3	18	—	CAN: 2× Platinum; AUS: 2× Platinum; UK: Platinum; US: 2× Platinum
All You Can Eat	Release date: October 10, 1995; Label: Warner Bros.	10	—	3	1	7	37	—	CAN: Gold; AUS: Platinum; UK: Silver; US: Gold
Drag	Release date: June 10, 1997; Label: Warner Bros.	39	—	4	16	19	29	—	AUS: Platinum; US: Gold
Invincible Summer	Release date: June 20, 2000; Label: Warner Bros.	10	—	12	45	17	58	—	AUS: Gold
Hymns of the 49th Parallel	Release date: July 27, 2004; Label: Nonesuch	2	—	3	23	91	56	—	CAN: Platinum; AUS: 2× Platinum; UK: Silver
Watershed	Release date: February 5, 2008; Label: Nonesuch	3	—	1	16	35	8	—	AUS: Gold
"—" denotes releases that did not chart

=== Collaborative albums ===
Title	Album details	Peak chart positions							Certifications (sales thresholds)
Title	Album details	CAN	CAN Country	AUS	NZ	UK	US	US Country	Certifications (sales thresholds)
A Truly Western Experience (with The Reclines)	Release date: 1984; Label: Bumstead	—	—	—	—	—	—	—	
Angel with a Lariat (with The Reclines)	Release date: July 7, 1987; Label: Sire, Warner Bros.	—	40	—	—	—	—	53	CAN: Gold
Absolute Torch and Twang (with The Reclines)	Release date: May 23, 1989; Label: Sire, Warner Bros.	29	8	81	—	—	69	12	CAN: Platinum; UK: Silver; US: Gold; AUS: Gold
A Wonderful World (with Tony Bennett)	Release date: November 5, 2002; Label: RPM, Columbia	32	—	23	48	33	41	—	US: Gold; AUS: Platinum
Sing It Loud (with The Siss Boom Bang)	Release date: April 12, 2011; Label: Nonesuch	7	—	2	28	34	32	—	ARIA: Gold
case/lang/veirs (with case/lang/veirs)	Release date: June 17, 2016; Label: Anti-	20	—	12	—	28	33	—	
"—" denotes releases that did not chart

=== Live albums ===
Title	Album details	Peak chart positions	
Title	Album details	AUS	US
Live in Sydney	Release date: October 7, 1997; Label: Warner Bros.	—	—
Live by Request	Release date: August 14, 2001; Label: Warner Bros.	83	94

=== Soundtrack albums ===
Title	Album details	Peak chart positions						Certification
Title	Album details	CAN	CAN Country	AUS	NZ	UK	US	Certification
Even Cowgirls Get the Blues	Release date: November 2, 1993; Label: Warner Bros.	47	6	10	4	36	82	ARIA: Platinum

=== Compilation albums ===
Title	Album details	Peak chart positions				Certifications (sales thresholds)
Title	Album details	CAN	AUS	NZ	US	Certifications (sales thresholds)
Reintarnation	Release date: March 14, 2006; Label: Sire, Warner Bros.	—	168	—	—	
Recollection	Release date: February 9, 2010; Label: Nonesuch	3	1	2	36	CAN: 2× Platinum; AUS: 2× Platinum
Beautifully Combined	Release date: 2010; Label: Nonesuch	—	—	—	42	
Makeover	Release date: May 28, 2021; Label: Nonesuch	—	—	—	—	
"—" denotes releases that did not chart

=== Video albums ===
Title	Album details	Certifications (sales thresholds)
Harvest of Seven Years (Cropped and Chronicled)	Release date: 1991; Label: Warner Music Vision	
Live in Sydney	Release date: 1997; Label: Warner Music Vision	
Live By Request	Release date: 2001; Label: Warner Bros.	ARIA: Platinum
Live in London (With The BBC Concert Orchestra)	Release date: 2008; Label: Image Entertainment	ARIA: Gold
Ingénue Redux (Live from Majestic Theatre)	Release date: 2018; Label: MVD Visual	

== Singles ==
=== 1980s ===
Year	Single	Peak chart positions							Album
Year	Single	CAN	CAN AC	CAN Country	AUS	UK	US AC	US Country	Album
1983	"Friday Dance Promenade"	—	—	—	—	—	—	—	—N/a
1984	"Hanky Panky"	—	—	—	—	—	—	—	A Truly Western Experience
1987	"Turn Me Around"	—	—	—	—	—	—	—	Angel with a Lariat
1987	"Rose Garden"	—	7	45	—	—	—	—	Angel with a Lariat
1987	"Tune into My Wave"	—	—	45	—	—	—	—	Angel with a Lariat
1987	"Three Cigarettes in an Ashtray"	—	—	—	—	—	—	—	Angel with a Lariat
1987	"Crying" (with Roy Orbison) (Note: "Crying" did not chart in Australia and the United Kingdom until 1992.)	2	4	—	71	13	28	42	Hiding Out
1988	"I'm Down to My Last Cigarette"	—	—	7	—	—	—	21	Shadowland
1988	"Lock, Stock, and Teardrops"	—	—	49	—	—	—	53	Shadowland
1988	"Busy Being Blue"	—	—	66	—	—	—	—	Shadowland
1989	"Our Day Will Come"	—	—	—	—	—	—	—	Shag
1989	"Full Moon Full of Love"	—	—	1	—	—	—	22	Absolute Torch and Twang
1989	"Trail of Broken Hearts"	87	—	—	—	—	—	—	Absolute Torch and Twang
1989	"Three Days"	—	—	9	—	—	—	55	Absolute Torch and Twang
"—" denotes releases that did not chart

=== 1990s ===
Year	Single	Peak chart positions								Album
Year	Single	CAN	CAN AC	CAN Country	AUS	UK	US	US AC	US Dance	Album
1990	"Pulling Back the Reins"	—	—	—	—	—	—	—	—	Absolute Torch and Twang
1990	"Luck in My Eyes"	—	—	10	—	—	—	—	—	Absolute Torch and Twang
1990	"Big Boned Gal"	—	—	23	—	—	—	—	—	Absolute Torch and Twang
1990	"Ridin' the Rails" (with Take 6)	—	19	—	—	—	—	—	—	Dick Tracy
1991	"Barefoot"	—	—	—	—	—	—	—	—	Salmonberries
1992	"Constant Craving"	8	2	—	38	15	38	2	—	Ingénue
1992	"Calling All Angels" (with Jane Siberry)	—	8	—	—	—	—	—	—	Until the End of the World
1992	"Miss Chatelaine"	58	25	—	145	68	—	32	—	Ingénue
1993	"The Mind of Love"	49	6	—	130	72	—	—	—	Ingénue
1993	"Just Keep Me Moving"	25	7	—	63	59	—	—	6	Even Cowgirls Get the Blues
1994	"Hush Sweet Lover"	42	7	—	28	—	—	—	—	Even Cowgirls Get the Blues
1994	"Lifted by Love"	—	—	—	—	—	—	—	1	Even Cowgirls Get the Blues
1995	"If I Were You"	24	4	—	23	53	— (Note: "If I Were You" did not enter the Billboard Hot 100, but peaked at number 15 on the Bubbling Under Hot 100 Singles chart.)	—	1	All You Can Eat
1996	"You're Ok"	44	10	—	56	44	—	—	—	All You Can Eat
1996	"Sexuality"	—	31	—	67	—	—	—	3	All You Can Eat
1997	"The Joker"	—	36	—	133	—	—	—	—	Drag
1997	"(Theme from) Valley of the Dolls"	—	—	—	—	—	—	—	14	Drag
1997	"The Air That I Breathe"	—	—	—	123	—	—	—	—	Drag
1998	"Fado Hilário"	—	—	—	—	—	—	—	—	Onda Sonora: Red Hot + Lisbon
1999	"Anywhere but Here"	46	5	—	—	—	—	—	—	Anywhere but Here
"—" denotes releases that did not chart

- "Constant Craving" did not reach its peak in the UK until 1993.

=== 2000s and 2010s ===
Year	Single	Peak chart positions							Album
Year	Single	CAN	CAN AC	AUS	UK	US	US AAA	US Dance	Album
2000	"Summerfling"	—	2	124	83	—	28	25	Invincible Summer
2000	"The Consequences of Falling"	—	—	—	77	—	—	—	Invincible Summer
2002	"What a Wonderful World" (with Tony Bennett)	—	—	—	—	—	—	—	A Wonderful World
2004	"Helpless"	—	18	—	—	—	—	—	Hymns of the 49th Parallel
2005	"Love Is Everything"	—	—	—	—	—	—	—	Hymns of the 49th Parallel
2005	"Simple"	—	—	—	—	—	—	—	Hymns of the 49th Parallel
2007	"I Dream of Spring"	—	—	—	—	—	—	—	Watershed
2010	"Hallelujah" (Vancouver Winter 2010 Version)	2	—	13	—	61	—	—	Recollection
2011	"I Confess"	—	—	—	—	—	—	—	Sing It Loud
"—" denotes releases that did not chart

== Music videos ==
Year	Title
1987	"Turn Me Around"
1987	"Crying"
1988	"Honky Tonk Angels Medley"
1989	"Trail of Broken Hearts"
1990	"Pulling Back the Reins"
1990	"Ridin' The Rails"
1990	"So In Love"
1991	"Barefoot"
1992	"Constant Craving"
1992	"Miss Chatelaine"
1993	"The Mind of Love"
1993	"Just Keep Me Moving"
1994	"Hush Sweet Lover"
1995	"If I Were You"
1996	"You're Ok"
1996	"Sexuality"
1999	"Anywhere but Here"
2000	"Summerfling"
2005	"Love Is Everything"
2005	"Simple"
2011	"I Confess"

== Contributions ==
Soundtracks

- Shag - "Our Day Will Come" (with The Reclines & Take 6)
- Dick Tracy - "Ridin' The Rails" (with Take 6)
- Until the End of the World - "Calling All Angels" (with Jane Siberry)
- Coneheads - "No More Tears (Enough is Enough)" (with Andy Bell)
- Twister - "Love Affair"
- Home on the Range - "Little Patch of Heaven"
- The Unplugged Collection, Volume One - "Barefoot"
- Midnight in the Garden of Good and Evil - "Skylark"
- Tomorrow Never Dies - "Surrender"
- Anywhere but Here - "Anywhere but Here"
- Pee-wee’s Playhouse Christmas Special - "Jingle Bell Rock"
- The Jim Henson Hour - "I Love Trash"
- The MAX Sessions - "Helpless" (live)
- Desperate Housewives - "Dreams of the Everyday Housewife"
- The Black Dahlia (film, not on soundtrack) - "Love for Sale"
- Happy Feet - "Golden Slumbers" / "The End"
- Roy Orbison and Friends, A Black and White Night

Compilations

- Northern Songs: Canada's Best and Brightest - "Constant Craving"
- Grammy's Greatest Moments Volume II - "Constant Craving" (live version)
- Being Out Rocks - "Summerfling"
- Oh What a Feeling 3 - "Helpless"
- Sounds Eclectic: The Covers Project - "Hallelujah"
- Nashville: A New Country Tradition - "You Ain't Woman Enough (To Take My Man)" (with Rosanne Cash)
- Red Hot + Blue - "So in Love"
- Tame Yourself - "Damned Old Dog"
- Onda Sonora: Red Hot + Lisbon - "Fado Hilário"
- Remembering Patsy Cline (2003) - "Leavin' On Your Mind"
- Women: Live From The Mountain Stage (1996) - "Lock Stock and Teardrops" (live)
- A Tribute to Joni Mitchell - "Help Me"
- We All Love Ella: Celebrating the First Lady of Song - "Angel Eyes"

Collaborations

- Mrs. Fun: They Are Not A Trio (1991) - "Lulu's Lament"
- Dion: Yo Frankie (1989) - "Drive All Night"
- Dwight Yoakam: Just Lookin' for a Hit - "Sin City"
- Wendy & Lisa: Eroica - "Mother of Pearl"
- Bob Telson: Calling You (1992) - "Barefoot"
- Bruce Roberts: Intimacy - "Intimacy"
- Elton John: Duets - "Teardrops"
- The Killers: Imploding the Mirage - "Lightning Fields"
- Carole King: Love Makes The World - "Uncommon Love"
- Nellie McKay: Pretty Little Head - "We Had It Right"
- Tony Bennett: MTV Unplugged: Tony Bennett - "Moonglow"
- Tony Bennett: Playing with My Friends: Bennett Sings the Blues - "Keep the Faith, Baby"
- Tony Bennett: Duets: An American Classic - "Because of You"
- Madeleine Peyroux: Half the Perfect World - "River"
- Cornelius: CM2 (2003) - "Curiosity"
- Ann Wilson: Hope & Glory - "Jackson"
- 1 Giant Leap: What About Me? - "Wounded in All the Right Places"
- Anne Murray: Duets: Friends & Legends - "A Love Song"
- Rosemary Clooney: 70: A Seventieth Birthday Celebration (1998) - "Our Love Is Here to Stay" (with Linda Ronstadt)
