= Reintarnation =

Compilation album by k.d. lang
- Released: April 24, 2006
- Recorded: 1984–1993
- Genre: Country
- Label: Sire, Rhino, Warner Bros.

K.d. lang chronology
Hymns of the 49th Parallel (2004)	Reintarnation (2006)	Watershed (2008)

Reintarnation is the first compilation album by k.d. lang, released in 2006. The album's cover is a homage to Elvis Presley's debut album cover, Elvis Presley. This albums includes songs from the 1983 - 1989 period.

== Track listing ==
No.	Title	Length
1.	"Pay Dirt" (from Angel with a Lariat)	2:10
2.	"Don't Let the Stars Get in Your Eyes" (from Shadowland)	2:19
3.	"Big Boned Gal" (from Absolute Torch and Twang)	3:08
4.	"Don't Be a Lemming Polka" (from Even Cowgirls Get the Blues)	2:17
5.	"Curious Soul Astray" (from Even Cowgirls Get the Blues)	3:39
6.	"It's Me" (from Absolute Torch and Twang)	2:20
7.	"Luck in My Eyes" (from Absolute Torch and Twang)	3:53
8.	"Diet of Strange Places" (from Angel with a Lariat)	2:30
9.	"Big Big Love" (from Absolute Torch and Twang)	3:21
10.	"Trail of Broken Hearts" (from Absolute Torch and Twang)	3:21
11.	"Nowhere to Stand" (from Absolute Torch and Twang)	4:35
12.	"Friday Dance Promenade" (previously unreleased)	2:20
13.	"Got the Bull by the Horns" (from Angel with a Lariat)	3:02
14.	"Angel with a Lariat" (from Angel with a Lariat)	3:11
15.	"Pine and Stew" (from A Truly Western Experience)	3:14
16.	"Hanky Panky" (from A Truly Western Experience)	1:59
17.	"Pullin' Back the Reins" (from Absolute Torch and Twang)	4:26
18.	"Cowgirl Pride" (from Even Cowgirls Get the Blues)	1:46
19.	"Changed My Mind" (previously unreleased)	2:45
20.	"Turn Me Round" (from Angel with a Lariat)	3:16

== Charts ==
=== Weekly charts ===
Chart (2006)	Peak position
Australian Album (ARIA)	168
