= Summer Fling =

Summer Fling may refer to:

- Summer Fling, a 1996 film also known as The Last of the High Kings
- Summer Fling, a 2003 studio album by the Red Hot Valentines
- "Summer Fling", a song by Mykki Blanco
- "Summer Fling", a song by Nina Nesbitt from Älskar, 2022
- "Summer Fling", a song by Willow Smith
- Summer Fling, an event created by Ontario Young Liberals

== See also ==
- "Summerfling", a song by k.d. lang
