= Watershed (k.d. lang album) =

Studio album by k.d. lang
- Released: February 5, 2008
- Genres: Folk, jazz, pop, country
- Length: 38:51
- Label: Nonesuch
- Producers: k.d. lang, David Piltch

K.d. lang chronology
| Reintarnation (2006) | Watershed (2008) | Recollection (2010) |

Alternative cover
- Limited edition

Professional ratings
Aggregate scores
| Source | Rating |
|---|---|
| Metacritic | (76/100) |
Review scores
| Source | Rating |
| Allmusic | 3.5/5 stars |
| Billboard | (positive) |
| The Boston Globe | (favorable) |
| Hot Press | (positive) |
| Now | 4/5 stars |
| The Observer | 3/5 stars |
| Paste | (6/10) |
| PopMatters | 8/10 stars |
| Rolling Stone | 3.5/5 stars |
| Uncut | 4/5 stars |

Watershed is the seventh and most recent solo studio album by k.d. lang and was released on February 5, 2008. It is her first collection of original material since 2000's Invincible Summer. In the US, it debuted at #8 on the Billboard 200, with approximately 41,000 copies sold. In Australia it debuted at #3 on the ARIA Albums Chart and in its ninth week moved to the #1 spot, up from the #38 position one week earlier. In the UK, it debuted and peaked at #35.

A limited edition of the album was released in deluxe packaging which contained a bonus disc with four live tracks and an interview. "I Dream of Spring" was the album's first single, released on November 18, 2007.

== Track listing ==
| No. | Title | Writer(s) | Length |
|---|---|---|---|
| 1. | "I Dream of Spring" | k.d. lang, David Piltch | 4:00 |
| 2. | "Je fais la planche" | lang, Ben Mink | 2:51 |
| 3. | "Coming Home" | lang, Piltch | 3:26 |
| 4. | "Once in a While" | lang | 3:27 |
| 5. | "Thread" | lang, Piltch | 3:38 |
| 6. | "Close Your Eyes" | Teddy Borowiecki, lang, Greg Leisz, Piltch | 4:26 |
| 7. | "Sunday" | Borowiecki, lang | 4:17 |
| 8. | "Flame of the Uninspired" | lang, Mink | 3:30 |
| 9. | "Upstream" | lang, Piltch | 3:37 |
| 10. | "Shadow and the Frame" | Borowiecki, lang, Ann Meredith | 3:07 |
| 11. | "Jealous Dog" | lang, Piltch | 2:32 |

Bonus live tracks
| No. | Title | Writer(s) | Length |
|---|---|---|---|
| 1. | "I Dream of Spring" | lang, Piltch | 3:45 |
| 2. | "Wash Me Clean" | lang | 4:11 |
| 3. | "The Valley" | Jane Siberry | 6:20 |
| 4. | "Hallelujah" | Leonard Cohen | 5:22 |

== Personnel ==
- k.d. lang – banjo, guitar, percussion, piano, harp, keyboards, vocals, drum programming, production
- Teddy Borowiecki – organ, guitar, piano, keyboards, programming, vibraphone, string conductor, photography
- Grecco Buratto – guitar
- Danny Frankel – percussion, drums
- Jon Hassell – trumpet
- Greg Leisz – guitar, electric guitar, steel guitar
- Ben Mink – acoustic guitar
- Noam Pikelny – banjo
- David Piltch – bass, guitar, percussion, electric bass, drums, acoustic bass, production
- Bryan Sutton – guitar

Technical

- Lynne Earls – engineering, programming, editing
- David Leonard – mixing, string engineering, string mixing
- Steve Jensen, Martin Kirkup – management
- Glen Nakasako, Jeri Heiden – photography
- John Heiden, Nick Steinhardt – design

== Charts ==
=== Weekly charts ===
| Chart (2008) | Peak position |
|---|---|
| Australian Albums (ARIA) | 1 |
| Canadian Albums Chart | 3 |
| New Zealand Albums (RMNZ) | 16 |
| Norwegian Albums (VG-lista) | 40 |
| UK Albums Chart | 35 |
| U.S. Billboard 200 | 8 |

=== Year-end charts ===
| Chart (2008) | Position |
|---|---|
| Australian Albums Chart | 44 |

== Certifications ==
| Region | Certification | Certified units/sales |
|---|---|---|
| Australia (ARIA) | Gold | 35,000^{^} |
| Canada (Music Canada) | Gold | 50,000^{^} |
^{^} Shipments figures based on certification alone.
