= Live by Request (k.d. lang album) =

Live album by k.d. lang
- Released: August 14, 2001
- Recorded: December 14, 2000
- Venue: John Jay College of Criminal Justice, Midtown Manhattan
- Genre: Adult contemporary
- Length: 53:21
- Label: Warner Bros.
- Producer: Mitch Maketansky; Allen Kelman

K.d. lang chronology
Invincible Summer (2000)	Live by Request (2001)	A Wonderful World (2002)

Professional ratings
Review scores
Source	Rating
Allmusic	3/5 stars
Entertainment Weekly	B+
The Rolling Stone Album Guide	3.5/5 stars

Live by Request is a live album by k.d. lang, released in 2001 (see 2001 in music). The album was recorded during the taping of the television show Live by Request on the A&E Network. The performance was on December 14, 2000 at the John Jay College of Criminal Justice in Midtown Manhattan.

== Track listing ==
1. "Summerfling" (Lang, David Piltch) – 4:03
2. "Big Boned Gal" (Lang, Ben Mink) – 2:55
3. "Black Coffee" (Sonny Burke, Paul Francis Webster) – 3:44
4. "Trail of Broken Hearts" (Lang, Ben Mink) – 3:19
5. "Crying" (Joe Melson, Roy Orbison) – 4:32
6. "Don't Smoke in Bed" (Willard Robison) – 3:44
7. "The Consequences of Falling" (Marie-Claire D'Ubaldo, Rick Nowels, Billy Steinberg) – 3:55
8. "Miss Chatelaine" (Lang, Ben Mink) – 3:25
9. "Three Cigarettes in an Ashtray" (Eddie Miller, W.S. Stevenson) – 2:52
10. "Barefoot" (Lang, Bob Telson) – 4:20
11. "Constant Craving" (Lang, Ben Mink) – 4:32
12. "Wash Me Clean" (Lang) – 3:50
13. "Pullin' Back the Reins" (Lang, Ben Mink) – 4:41
14. "Simple" (Lang, David Piltch) – 3:29

== Personnel ==
- k.d. lang - vocals
- Gregg Arreguin - guitar
- Teddy Borowiecki - keyboard
- Amy Keys - background vocals
- Abe Laboriel Jr. - drums
- Greg Leisz - guitar, pedal steel
- Kate Markowitz - background vocals
- David Piltch - bass

Windy Wagner (background vocals)

== Production ==
- Producer: Mitch Maketansky
- Executive producers: Danny Bennett, Andy Kadison, Paul Rappaport
- Mixing: David Thoener
- Repertoire: Mio Vukovic
- Director: Lawrence Jordan
- Lighting director: Dale Lynch
- Stage technician: Bobby Carlos
- Art direction: Mio Vukovic
- Design: Lawrence Azerrad

== Charts ==
Chart performance for Live by Request
Chart (2001)	Peak position
Australian Albums (ARIA)	83
US Billboard 200	94
