= Cloverton =

Cloverton may refer to:

- Cloverton (band), a Christian band from Manhattan, Kansas
- Cloverton, Minnesota, an unincorporated area in Pine County, Minnesota
- Cloverton, a residential development in the City of Hume (northern fringe of Melbourne) in Victoria, Australia

== See also ==
- Clovertown
