= Hymns of the 49th Parallel =

Studio album by k.d. lang
- Released: 27 July 2004
- Studio: Conway Recording Studios (Los Angeles, CA)
- Genre: Folk; pop; country; gospel
- Length: 47:17
- Label: Nonesuch
- Producer: k.d. lang; Ben Mink

K.d. lang chronology
A Wonderful World (2002)	Hymns of the 49th Parallel (2004)	Reintarnation (2006)

Professional ratings
Aggregate scores
Source	Rating
Metacritic	(70/100)
Review scores
Source	Rating
Allmusic	3.5/5 stars
Billboard	(favorable)
Blender	4.5/5 stars
Entertainment Weekly	C+
The Guardian	4/5 stars
Mojo	4/5 stars
musicOMH	(favorable)
People	3.5/4 stars
Q	2/5 stars
The Rolling Stone Album Guide	4/5 stars
Uncut	2/5 stars
The Village Voice	(favorable)

Hymns of the 49th Parallel is the ninth studio album by the Canadian singer and songwriter k.d. lang, released in 2004. It is an album of songs by lang's favourite Canadian songwriters, and also includes a new version of her original composition "Simple" that initially appeared on her 2000 album Invincible Summer.

== Title ==
The album's title refers to the Canada–United States border as the 49th parallel defines much of the international boundary between the two countries.

== Track listing ==
1. "After the Gold Rush" (Neil Young) – 4:00
2. "Simple" (k.d. lang, David Piltch) – 3:02
3. "Helpless" (Neil Young) – 4:15
4. "A Case of You" (Joni Mitchell) – 5:12
5. "The Valley" (Jane Siberry) – 5:31
6. "Hallelujah" (Leonard Cohen) – 5:01
7. "One Day I Walk" (Bruce Cockburn) – 3:24
8. "Fallen" (Ron Sexsmith) – 2:56
9. "Jericho" (Joni Mitchell) – 3:45
10. "Bird on a Wire" (Leonard Cohen) – 4:28
11. "Love is Everything" (Jane Siberry) – 5:43

== Personnel ==
- k.d. lang – vocals
- Teddy Borowiecki – piano, accordion, keyboard
- Clayton Cameron – drums
- Larry Corbett – cello
- Brian Dembow – viola
- Eumir Deodato – conductor
- Stephen Erdody – cello
- Cynthia Fogg – viola
- Tiffiany Yi Hu – violin
- Armen Ksadjikian – cello
- Ben Mink – acoustic guitar, fiddle, electric guitar
- Ralph Morrison – violin, concert master
- Sara Parkins – violin
- David Piltch – electric bass guitar, acoustic bass guitar
- David Stenske – violin
- Cecilia Tsan – cello

== Production ==
- Producers: k.d. lang, Ben Mink
- Engineer: David Leonard
- Mixing: David Leonard
- Mastering: Bob Ludwig
- Digital editing: Ben Mink
- Assistant: John Morrical
- Technical assistance: David Eaman, John Musgrave, Russell Nash
- String arrangements: Eumir Deodato
- Contractor: David Sherr
- Copyist: Tom Calderaro
- Cover photo: Andy Goldsworthy
- Photography: Jeri Heiden, John Heiden

== Charts ==
=== Charts ===
Chart (2004)	Peak position
Australian Albums (ARIA)	3
Canadian Albums Chart	2
Dutch Mega Albums Chart	90
New Zealand Albums (RMNZ)	23
United States Billboard 200	37

=== Year-end charts ===
Chart (2004)	Position
Australian Albums Chart	44
Chart (2005)	Position
Australian Albums Chart	85

== Certifications ==
Region	Certification	Certified units/sales
Australia (ARIA)	2× Platinum	140,000^{^}
Canada (Music Canada)	Platinum	100,000^{^}
United Kingdom (BPI)	Silver	60,000^{‡}
^{^} Shipments figures based on certification alone.^{‡} Sales+streaming figures based on certification alone.
