= Hallelujah: Leonard Cohen, A Journey, A Song =

- Poster
- Directed by: Daniel Geller; Dayna Goldfine
- Written by: Daniel Geller; Dayna Goldfine
- Based on: The Holy or the Broken by Alan Light
- Produced by: Daniel Geller; Dayna Goldfine
- Edited by: Dayna Goldfine; Bill Weber; Dan Geller
- Music by: Hal Willner (music producer); John Lissauer (original score)
- Production company: Geller/Goldfine Productions
- Distributed by: Sony Pictures Classics
- Release dates: June 30, 2022 (United States); July 15, 2022 (Canada); January 27, 2023 (Netflix)
- Running time: 115 minutes
- Countries: United States; Canada
- Language: English
- Box office: $2.5 million (worldwide)

Hallelujah: Leonard Cohen, A Journey, A Song is a 2022 feature-length documentary biographical film created by Dan Geller and Dayna Goldfine describing the story of Leonard Cohen, focusing on his song "Hallelujah". The film is based on Alan Light's 2012 book The Holy or the Broken.

== Content ==
New York Times critic A. O. Scott described the film as "wrapping a circumspect biography of the singer... around the story of the song", with archival footage and interviews with friends and admirers. Writer Rob LeDonne described it in The Guardian as "tak(ing) both a micro and macro view of the song and Cohen, along with their respective and deeply intertwined places in culture. Nicolas Rapold wrote in the Times that the film "trace(s) Cohen's career from his early days in Montreal to his 21st-century renaissance, exploring his creative process, his spiritual search and how his perhaps best-known song... took on a life of its own", the film taking "a deep dive" into Cohen's "writing and rewriting and erasing" process to better understand him. In The Atlantic, critic Kevin Dettmar said the film "documents the record’s long, strange trip to ubiquity. It's a tale about the vagaries of recording history and the foolishness of industry suits, but it's also about rediscovery and inspiration and reinvention".

Geller said "the real focus is Leonard the man asking the deep questions about the purpose of life, the challenges of life, the holiness of life, and the brokenness of life". In a different focus, Goldfine remarked that the documentary "is about one's own center, and one's own role and place in life". More broadly, Goldfine quipped that "although it's primarily looking at Leonard through the prism of Hallelujah, we slyly stuck in another 22 Leonard Cohen songs".

Geller noted that the film includes not only several of Cohen's performances of "Hallelujah"—as he ages, singing it with different feelings and different verses—but also that there are 22 other songs. The last third of the documentary is devoted to Cohen's comeback in the 21st century, and includes clips of his later concerts.

== Cast ==
In addition to Cohen himself, various people affiliated with Cohen or associated with the song appear in the film, including artistic collaborator Sharon Robinson, John Lissauer (who produced and arranged of the original version of the song), Larry "Ratso" Sloman (a longtime interviewer), music producer Clive Davis, Rufus Wainwright, Brandi Carlile, Regina Spektor, Amanda Palmer, Eric Church, and other artists who recorded their own versions. The film draws from numerous unpublished conversations with Cohen collaborators Judy Collins, Dominique Issermann and others.

== Background and production ==
For Geller and Goldfine, it was footage of Cohen singing Hallelujah on stage during a performance in Oakland, California, that partly inspired them to make the documentary.

In summer 2014, film historian and writer David Thomson suggested during a dinner with Geller and Goldfine that they do a film based on a single song. Goldfine related that "literally within 10 minutes at the dinner table" she thought they could do a film about "Hallelujah" since it could occupy their attention for the years it would take to make a documentary, with Cohen being one artist she "thought it would be gratifying to plumb for that length of time". Initially, as Geller described, they "knew the incredible power of the song" but "we didn't know the crazy trajectory of that song when (we) first started talking about it". Soon, they discovered Alan Light's 2012 book The Holy or the Broken, which confirmed "there's something there".

From a personal standpoint, I really would have loved to have interviewed (Cohen), but from the beginning this (film was) really to look at his life through the lens of the song and the spiritual quest and contradictions that are in the song rather than some comprehensive, 'He was born on such and such a day.'

— Daniel Gellar, to Billboard

Alan Light, who served as a consulting producer on the film, warned that Cohen would not consent to being interviewed for a film, and that licensing "is going to be the most complicated thing you ever deal with in your career". Within a week after receiving Geller and Goldfine's proposal, Cohen approved the film before his 80th birthday (September 2014). However, it took about two years to resolve licensing terms with Sony Music which controlled the rights to the singer's publishing. Interviews began in spring 2016, and shooting didn't begin until August 2016, not long before Cohen's death in November.

Over time, Geller and Goldfine were granted interviews with people associated with the song, and gained access to photographs, concert recordings, and archival material from Cohen's estate, including his notebooks and journals—actual hands-on drafts of the song. They said they collected over 100 hours of archival footage and audio, plus another 60 or 70 hours of original interview material, from which they formed the film of less than two hours.

== Release ==
The film debuted at the Venice and Telluride Film Festivals in September 2021, and was shown on June 12, 2022 at the Tribeca Film Festival. The film's release coincided with a new Cohen compilation, Hallelujah and Songs From His Albums, and an updated version of Light's book. The film became available on Netflix in late January, 2023.

== Reception ==
In October 2022, the film was nominated for Critics Choice Best Music Documentary.

Daniel Fienberg's review for The Hollywood Reporter said that the film "has a better grasp of the artist’s ineffable appeal than most (other films about Cohen), and a smarter approach. The documentary contains elements of a conventional biopic, but it probably won't satisfy audiences looking for a soup-to-nuts overview". Though the film is limited to focusing on Cohen with only one song as a centerpiece, "two hours is insufficient, though there’s much to admire in the effort".

The film is a New York Times Critic's Pick, with Times critic A. O. Scott calling the book "a fascinating study in the mechanics and metaphysics of pop-culture memory".

Simon Abrams' 2-star review on RogerEbert.com said that the film "doesn't give deep consideration to the conditions that led to "Hallelujah" becoming a late career hit for Cohen", "though archival interviews with Cohen do effectively suggest that there’s more to his music—and that song, in particular—than the usual artistic triumph over industrial exploitation narrative. Abrams added, "A lot of substantial or just different material might have enriched this documentary’s tidy fall-and-rise story."

Jonathan Marlow's review in the San Francisco Examiner said that the film was "endlessly fascinating", and, "focusing on the richness of an inspiration", is "one of the only films about Cohen that is worthy of its subject", adding that "the tale of its making... is equally compelling". Marlow said that "the film fortunately spares audiences the... montage of... amateur versions while focusing largely on the better renditions".

Ann Hornaday's 2.5/4-star review in The Washington Post called the film an "illuminating, if occasionally too obliging, documentary" that "only obliquely considers how love for a piece of music can kill it as surely as the crassest record executive". She added, "What turns out to be the most moving and meaningful thing about the film isn’t the song at its center, but the work ethic of a man who might have disappeared from the public eye for years at a time but never stopped sweating every word".

Brad Wheeler's Globe and Mail review concluded that "Cohen aficionados... might prefer a more focused and deeper dive into Hallelujah without so much personal biography. Mainstream audiences, on the other hand, will appreciate the context and the pairing of song and subject: Hallelujah mixes sex and spirituality, as did the libidinous Buddhist."

Xan Brooks' 3/5-star review for The Guardian said, "while it may be a fool's errand to frame Leonard Cohen's life and times through the prism of just one song, directors Dan Geller and Dayna Goldfine make a decent fist of it here". Brooks added, "if this thorough, respectful documentary largely leaves its subject's mystery intact, that's probably for the best and what the singer would have wanted".
