= The Holy or the Broken =

2012 book by Alan Light

- First edition
- Author: Alan Light
- Language: English
- Publisher: Atria Books
- Publication date: 2012
- Publication place: United States
- Media type: Print
- Pages: 254 pp

The Holy or the Broken: Leonard Cohen, Jeff Buckley & the Unlikely Ascent of 'Hallelujah' is a 2012 non-fiction book written by Alan Light.

== Overview ==
A look into the enduring popularity of the Leonard Cohen song "Hallelujah" and Jeff Buckley's cover version of it.

The book is the basis for the 2022 biographical documentary film Hallelujah: Leonard Cohen, A Journey, A Song created by Dan Geller and Dayna Goldfine. Light served as a consulting producer for the film.
