= Full Moon Full of Love =

Single by k.d. lang

from the album Absolute Torch and Twang
- Released: 1989
- Genre: Country, Western swing
- Length: 2:49
- Label: Sire
- Songwriters: Leroy Preston; Jeannie Smith
- Producers: k.d. lang Ben Mink; Greg Penny

K.d. lang singles chronology
"Busy Being Blue" (1988)	"Full Moon Full of Love" (1989)	"Three Days" (1989)

"Full Moon Full of Love" is a single by Canadian country music artist k.d. lang. Released in 1989, it was the first single from lang's album Absolute Torch and Twang. The song reached #1 on the RPM Country Tracks chart in September 1989 and #22 on the Billboard Hot Country Singles chart.

== Chart performance ==
Chart (1989)	Peak position
Canada Country Singles (RPM)	1
US Hot Country Songs (Billboard)	22

=== Year-end charts ===
Chart (1989)	Position
Canada Country Tracks (RPM)	1
