= Alan Light =

American journalist and author

- Born: August 4, 1966 (age 60)
- Citizenship: United States
- Education: Yale University
- Occupations: Journalist, author, editor
- Writing career
- Years active: 1990–present
- Subject: Music

Alan Light (born August 4, 1966) is an American journalist who has been a rock critic for Rolling Stone and the editor-in-chief for Vibe, Spin, and Tracks.

== Early life ==
Light grew up in Cincinnati, Ohio, where he attended Cincinnati Country Day School. His mother was a dance reviewer for the local newspaper. His father, Dr. Irwin Light, was a neotologist at Cincinnati Children's Hospital. He graduated from Yale University in 1988, majoring in American Studies, and wrote his senior thesis on Licensed to Ill by the Beastie Boys.

== Career ==
Light had been an intern at Rolling Stone during their 20th anniversary year while still a student. He later joined the staff as a fact checker in 1989, becoming a senior writer in 1990. In 1993, he became the founding music editor of Vibe magazine, becoming editor-in-chief in 1994. In 1999 he became editor-in-chief for Spin magazine. He left Spin in March 2002 and founded the music magazine Tracks in 2003. He then worked as music reviewer on radio station WFUV, and served as music correspondent on NPR show Weekend America. He writes regularly for The New York Times.

Light has worked as consultant for the Rock & Roll Hall of Fame. He was a judge for the 4th Annual Independent Music Awards in 2005, and subsequently for the 11th, 12th and 13th Annual Independent Music Awards. Light has hosted programming on SiriusXM.

Light has also been involved in assisting homeless people with the Housing Works AIDS charity.

After publication of his 2012 book The Holy or the Broken: Leonard Cohen, Jeff Buckley & the Unlikely Ascent of 'Hallelujah', Light served as consulting producer for the 2022 film Hallelujah: Leonard Cohen, A Journey, A Song.

== Selected bibliography ==
- Tupac Amaru Shakur: 1971–1996 (with Quincy Jones), 1998
- The Vibe History of Hip Hop, 1999
- The Skills to Pay the Bills: The Story of the Beastie Boys, 2006
- My Cross To Bear (by Gregg Allman, with Alan Light), 2012
- The Holy or the Broken – Leonard Cohen, Jeff Buckley, and the Unlikely Ascent of 'Hallelujah', 2012
- Let's Go Crazy: Prince and the Making of Purple Rain, 2014
