= Remembering Patsy Cline =

Studio album by Various Artists
- Released: September 9, 2003
- Genre: Country
- Label: MCA

Professional ratings
Review scores
Source	Rating
Allmusic	3.5/5 stars

Remembering Patsy Cline is a tribute album to Patsy Cline. It was released on September 9, 2003 by MCA Records. The album peaked at number 1 on the Billboard Top Jazz Albums chart, number 8 on the Billboard Top Country Albums chart and number 71 on the all-genre Billboard 200.

== Track listing ==
No.	Title	Writer(s)	Performer(s)	Length
1.	"I Fall to Pieces"	Hank Cochran, Harlan Howard	Natalie Cole	5:29
2.	"Why Can't He Be You"	Cochran	Norah Jones	4:33
3.	"Back in Baby's Arms"	Bob Montgomery	Amy Grant	3:03
4.	"Crazy"	Willie Nelson	Diana Krall	4:32
5.	"Strange"	Fred Burch, Mel Tillis	Michelle Branch	2:58
6.	"She's Got You"	Cochran	Lee Ann Womack	3:48
7.	"Leavin' on Your Mind"	Webb Pierce, Wayne Walker	k.d. lang	4:53
8.	"Walkin' After Midnight"	Alan Block, Donn Hecht	Terri Clark	3:38
9.	"You're Stronger Than Me"	Cochran, Jimmy Key	Rebecca Lynn Howard	5:19
10.	"Faded Love"	Billy Jack Wills, Bob Wills, Johnnie Lee Wills	Patty Griffin	3:39
11.	"So Wrong"	Danny Dill, Carl Perkins, Tillis	Jessi Alexander	3:20
12.	"Sweet Dreams (Of You)"	Don Gibson	Martina McBride and Take 6	2:32

== Chart performance ==
Chart (2003)	Peak position
U.S. Billboard Top Jazz Albums	1
U.S. Billboard Top Country Albums	8
U.S. Billboard 200	71
