= Cloverton (band) =

Christian music band from Manhattan, Kansas, U.S.

- Origin: Manhattan, Kansas, U.S.
- Genres: Contemporary Christian music, contemporary worship music
- Years active: 2008–present
- Label: Fair Trade
- Members: Lance Stafford; Thaddeus Johnson; Layne Stafford
- Past members: Kirby LeMoine; Matt Brown; Tim Brantl; Layne Stafford; Conner Giles; Rains Wall; Matt Ehlinger; Joshua Svornic; Jon Moment
- Website: clovertonmusic.com

Cloverton is an American contemporary Christian music and worship band from Manhattan, Kansas, United States. The band started out as Lance Stafford on lead vocals and keys with his twin brother Layne Stafford on background vocals and bass guitar, alongside, drummer Kirby LeMoine and lead guitarist Matt Brown. This would change in 2015 with Kirby LeMoine's and Matt Brown's departure from the band, and the addition of Rains Wall on drums and Conner Giles on guitar. The band released a successful single in 2011, "Take Me Into the Beautiful" with Fair Trade. This charted on various Christian music songs charts that Billboard publishes. The band would not get to release a full-fledged album with the label, so they crowdfunded their debut album, Patterns, in 2013. Their first Christmas extended play album, We Sing Joy, charted on three Billboard charts. Their most recent album is Bloom, released September 8, 2017. Adding to their lineup in the summer/fall of 2017, Jon Moment and Thaddeus Johnson joined on bass and guitar. At the start of 2018, Cloverton signed with Red Letter Management. In 2019, the band release their second Christmas extended play album, Come & Adore. Layne Stafford rejoined the band in 2020 with the departure of Jon Moment.

== Background ==
Cloverton is a contemporary Christian music band from Manhattan, Kansas, made up of Lance Stafford on lead vocals and keys, Thaddeus Johnson on lead guitar, and Layne Stafford on bass guitar. Lance and Layne are twins; their father is a music teacher. At seven, the two started playing the piano and doing concerts. Each member of the inaugural band came from a musical background. The group began performing together at a Manhattan church. In 2010, the band won "Rock the Camp" contest put on by TobyMac’s Camp Electric and were consequently rewarded with air time on K-LOVE, a spot to perform on the K-LOVE cruise, "Rock the Cruise", and some studio time. This allowed them to start their musical careers.

== Music history ==
On January 31, 2009, the band independently released, Cloverton - EP. The band released, Take Me Into the Beautiful, with Fair Trade Services, in 2011, to Christian radio success with chartings on Billboard's Christian Songs at No. 21 and Christian CHR Songs at No. 13. This was on their extended play, The End Is the Beginning, that was released by Fair Trade on February 9, 2012. Then, the band would crowdfunded, Patterns, but this failed to chart. Yet, it was reviewed by publications positively such as HM Magazine, Jesus Freak Hideout, and New Release Tuesday, getting a three and a half star review from HM Magazine and acquiring a four and a half star review by New Release Tuesday. After this, Cloverton would release independently a Christmas music extended play, We Sing Joy, which charted on three Billboard charts: Christian Albums at No. 17, Heatseekers Albums at No. 3 and No. 28 on the Independent Albums chart. With this extended play, they released the single A Hallelujah Christmas, a substantially Christianized version of Jewish songwriter Leonard Cohen's signature song "Hallelujah," that charted at No. 29 on the Christian Songs chart and shot to No. 1 on iTunes.

In 2017, the band released their second crowdfunded album, Bloom. Although released independently, this record was received well by fans and industry alike. In 2019, the band released its second Christmas EP, Come & Adore.

== Discography ==
=== Albums ===
List of studio albums, with selected chart positions
Title	Album details	Peak chart positions		
Title	Album details	US Chr	US Heat	US Ind
Patterns	Released: September 17, 2013; Label: Cloverton; CD, digital download	-	-	-
Bloom	Released: September 8, 2017; Label: Cloverton; CD, digital download	-	-	-

=== EPs ===
List of studio albums, with selected chart positions
Title	Album details	Peak chart positions		
Title	Album details	US Chr	US Heat	US Ind
Cloverton - EP	Released: January 31, 2009; Label: Cloverton; CD, digital download	–	–	–
The End Is the Beginning EP	Released: February 9, 2012; Label: Fair Trade; CD, digital download	–	–	–
We Sing Joy EP	Released: October 31, 2014; Label: Cloverton; CD, digital download	17	3	28

=== Singles ===
Year	Title	Peak chart positions	
Year	Title	US Christian Songs	US Christian CHR
2011	"Take Me into the Beautiful"	21	13
2014	"A Hallelujah Christmas"	29	–
