= Drag (k.d. lang album) =

Studio album by k.d. lang
- Released: June 10, 1997
- Genres: Pop, blues, country
- Length: 52:26
- Label: Warner Bros.
- Producers: k.d. lang, Craig Street

K.d. lang chronology
All You Can Eat (1995)	Drag (1997)	Invincible Summer (2000)

Professional ratings
Review scores
Source	Rating
AllMusic	3/5 stars
Chicago Tribune	3/4 stars
Entertainment Weekly	B+
Los Angeles Times	3.5/4 stars
The New York Times	(Positive)
NME	6/10
Rolling Stone	3.5/5 stars
Uncut	3/5 stars

Drag is a cover album by k.d. lang, released in 1997; most of its songs feature a smoking motif, although some address broader issues of dependence and/or addiction. Lang's cover of Dionne Warwick's "(Theme from) Valley of the Dolls" was notably used in key scenes in the pilot episode and series finale of the Showtime comedy-drama series Nurse Jackie. The cover of "Hain't It Funny" was part of the soundtrack for the 2002 film Talk to Her.

== Reception ==
In an AllMusic review, Stephen Thomas Erlewine wrote, "A collection of covers that are somehow related to smoking, Drag is far more ambitious than the average cover record... lang's rich voice and the measured arrangements make Drag a ringer for Ingénue in places, but the tone is considerably lighter and more humorous, which certainly makes it an enjoyable listen."

Writing for the Los Angeles Times, Robert Hilburn said, "The pace is sometimes slow and demanding and a couple of the songs are marginal, but the heart of this album combines mainstream pop accessibility and torch-driven cabaret intimacy in ways that seem absolutely addicting themselves."

== Track listing ==
No.	Title	Writer(s)	Length
1.	"Don't Smoke in Bed"	Willard Robison	3:22
2.	"The Air That I Breathe"	Albert Hammond, Mike Hazlewood	5:58
3.	"Smoke Dreams"	John Klenner, Lloyd Shaffer, Ted Steele	3:49
4.	"My Last Cigarette"	Gary Clark, Boo Hewerdine, Neill MacColl	4:09
5.	"The Joker"	Eddie Curtis, Ahmet Ertegun, Steve Miller	4:44
6.	"Theme from the Valley of the Dolls"	Dory Langdon, André Previn	3:02
7.	"Your Smoke Screen"	David Barbe	2:29
8.	"My Old Addiction"	David Wilcox	6:39
9.	"Till the Heart Caves In"	T-Bone Burnett, Bob Neuwirth, Roy Orbison	3:30
10.	"Smoke Rings"	Gene Gifford, Ned Washington	3:36
11.	"Hain't It Funny?"	Jane Siberry	6:23
12.	"Love Is Like a Cigarette"	Jerome Jerome, Walter Kent, Richard Byron	4:45

== Personnel ==
- k.d. lang – vocals
- Teddy Borowieckl – piano, accordion, keyboard
- Kevin Breit – banjo, guitar
- Kimberly Brewer – background vocals
- Lisa Coleman – keyboards
- Anthony Cooke – cello
- Larry Corbett – cello
- Suzie Katayama – cello
- Bruce Dukov – violin
- Henry Ferber – violin
- Ron Folsom – violin
- Benji Gavabedian – violin
- Connie Grauer – piano
- Portia Griffin – background vocals
- Jimmie Haskell – conductor
- Jon Hassell – trumpet
- Pat Johnson – violin
- Karen Jones – violin
- Dennis Karmazyn – cello
- Ray Kelley – cello
- Jerry Kessler – cello
- Marva King – background vocals
- Abe Laboriel Jr. – drums
- Greg Leisz – pedal steel
- Gayle Levant – harp
- Joe Lovano – saxophone
- Joy Lyle – violin
- Wendy Melvoin – guitar
- Sid Page – violin
- David Piltch – bass
- Barbara Porter – cello
- Jay Rosen – violin
- David Torn – guitar, kotar
- Kim Zick – drums

== Production ==
- Producers: k.d. lang, Craig Street
- Engineer: Danny Kopelson
- Assistant engineer: Doug Boehm
- Mixing: Patrick McCarthy
- Mixing assistant: Mike Scotella
- Mastering: Greg Calbi
- Orchestration: Jimmie Haskell
- Art direction: Linda Cobb, K.D. Lang
- Design: Linda Cobb
- Photography: Albert Sanchez

== Charts ==
=== Weekly charts ===
Chart (1997)	Peak position
Australian Albums (ARIA)	4
Canadian RPM Albums Chart	39
New Zealand Albums (RMNZ)	16
UK Albums Chart	19
United States Billboard 200	29

=== Year-end charts ===
Chart (1997)	Position
Australian Albums Chart	46

== Certifications ==
Region	Certification	Certified units/sales
Australia (ARIA)	Platinum	70,000^{^}
United States (RIAA)	Gold	500,000^{^}
^{^} Shipments figures based on certification alone.
