= Shadowland (k.d. lang album) =

Studio album by k.d. lang
- Released: 1988
- Studio: Bradley's Barn, Mount Juliet, Tennessee
- Genre: Alternative country
- Length: 35:17
- Label: Sire, Warner Bros.
- Producer: Owen Bradley

k.d. lang chronology
Angel with a Lariat (1987)	Shadowland (1988)	Absolute Torch and Twang (1989)

Shadowland is the debut solo album by k.d. lang, released in 1988 (see 1988 in music). The album included her collaboration with Kitty Wells, Loretta Lynn and Brenda Lee on "Honky Tonk Angels' Medley" and was produced by Owen Bradley, who produced Patsy Cline's best-known work.

== Critical reception ==
Professional ratings
Review scores
Source	Rating
AllMusic	5/5 stars
Los Angeles Times	3/4 stars
Record Mirror	4 1/2/5
Rolling Stone	4/5 stars
The Rolling Stone Album Guide	3.5/5 stars
The Village Voice	B

The Toronto Star determined that "Shadowland is a self-conscious anachronism, haunted by vague, 25-year-old memories... It's as purely retrogressive and deferential as the Dave Edmunds-produced Angel with a Lariat, which came mighty close to re-defining country music, was radical and innovative."

== Track listing ==
=== Side one ===
1. "Western Stars" (Chris Isaak) – 3:12
2. "Lock, Stock and Teardrops" (Roger Miller) – 3:28
3. "Sugar Moon" (Cindy Walker, Bob Wills) – 2:26
4. "I Wish I Didn't Love You So" (Frank Loesser) – 3:07
5. "(Waltz Me) Once Again Around the Dance Floor" (Don Goodman, Sara Johns, Jack Rowland) – 2:35
6. "Black Coffee" (Sonny Burke, Paul Francis Webster) – 3:17

=== Side two ===
1. "Shadowland" (Dick Hyman, Charles Tobias) – 2:28
2. "Don't Let the Stars Get in Your Eyes" (Slim Willet) – 2:20
3. "Tears Don't Care Who Cries Them" (Fred Tobias, Charles Tobias) – 3:03
4. "I'm Down to My Last Cigarette" (Harlan Howard, Billy Walker) – 2:46
5. "Busy Being Blue" (Stewart MacDougall) – 3:40
6. "Honky Tonk Angels' Medley" – 2:55
  - "In the Evening (When the Sun Goes Down)" (Leroy Carr, Don Raye)
  - "You Nearly Lose Your Mind" (Ernest Tubb)
  - "Blues Stay Away from Me" (Alton Delmore, Rabon Delmore, Wayne Raney, Henry Glover)

== Personnel ==
- k.d. lang - vocals
- Harold Bradley - banjo, bass, ukulele, gut string guitar
- Jimmy Capps - rhythm guitar
- Buddy Emmons - pedal steel guitar
- Greg Leisz - lap steel guitar
- Tony Migliore - piano, accordion
- Roger Morris - piano
- Hargus "Pig" Robbins - piano
- Hal Rugg - pedal steel guitar
- Buddy Spicher - fiddle
- Henry Strzelecki - bass
- Pete Wade - electric guitar
- Rob Hajacos - fiddle
- Buddy Harman - drums
- Jim Horn - saxophone
- The Nashville String Machine
  - Bill McElhiney - arrangements
  - David Angell - violin
  - Roy Christensen - cello
  - Connie Ellisor - violin
  - Ted Madsen - violin
  - Bob Mason - cello
  - Pamela Sixfin - violin
  - Carl Gorodetzky - violin
  - Dennis Molchan - violin
  - George Binkley III - violin
  - John Borg - viola
  - Gary VanOsdale - viola
  - Anthony LaMarchina - cello
  - Lee Larrison - violin
- The Jordanaires - vocals on "Western Stars", "I Wish I Didn't Love You So" & "Tears Don't Care Who Cries Them"
  - Gordon Stoker
  - Louis Dean Nunley
  - Neal Matthews, Jr.
  - Duane West
- Tennessee - vocals on "Lock, Stock and Teardrops", "Sugar Moon", "Don't Let the Stars Get in Your Eyes" & "I'm Down to My Last Cigarette"
  - Hurshel Wiginton
  - Doug Clements
  - Louis Dean Nunley
  - Jim Ferguson
- The Honky Tonk Angels - vocals on "Honky Tonk Angels' Medley"
  - Brenda Lee
  - Loretta Lynn
  - Kitty Wells

== Production ==
- Producer: Owen Bradley
- Engineer: Bobby Bradley

== Chart performance ==
=== Weekly charts ===
Chart (1988)	Peak position
Canadian Country Albums (RPM)	23
Canadian Albums (RPM)	9
US Billboard 200	73
US Top Country Albums (Billboard)	9
Chart (1994)	Peak position
Australian Album (ARIA)	164

=== Year-end charts ===
Chart (1988)	Position
US Top Country Albums (Billboard)	32
Chart (1990)	Position
US Top Country Albums (Billboard)	67

== Certifications ==
Region	Certification	Certified units/sales
Australia (ARIA)	Gold	35,000^{^}
Canada (Music Canada)	Platinum	100,000^{^}
United States (RIAA)	Gold	500,000^{^}
^{^} Shipments figures based on certification alone.
