= Hallelujah (Leonard Cohen song) =

1984 single by Leonard Cohen

- Artwork for 1984 Dutch single

Single by Leonard Cohen

from the album Various Positions
- Released: December 1984
- Recorded: June 1984
- Genre: Folk rock
- Length: 4:39
- Label: Columbia
- Songwriter: Leonard Cohen
- Producer: John Lissauer

"Hallelujah" is a song written by Canadian singer Leonard Cohen, originally released on his album Various Positions (1984). Achieving little initial success, the song found greater popular acclaim through a new version recorded by John Cale in 1991. Cale's version inspired a 1994 recording by Jeff Buckley which in 2004 was ranked number 259 on Rolling Stone's list of the 500 Greatest Songs of All Time.

The song achieved widespread popularity after Cale's version of it was featured in the 2001 film Shrek. Many other arrangements have been performed in recordings and in concert, with more than 300 versions known as of 2008. The song has been used in film and television soundtracks and televised talent contests. "Hallelujah" experienced renewed interest following Cohen's death in November 2016 and re-appeared on international singles charts, including entering the American Billboard Hot 100 for the first time.

== History ==
Leonard Cohen's studio recording
Partial excerpt of first verse and chorus. First included in Cohen's 1984 album Various Positions.

Jeff Buckley "Hallelujah" cover excerpt
From the album Grace, released in 1994. In 2007, Sony BMG rereleased the album (subtitled "The Legacy Edition") with a live music video of the song.

Cohen is reputed to have written between 80 and 180 draft verses for "Hallelujah"—a number affected by having many versions of the same line, although only 7 of these have been officially released. He claimed 150 draft verses, substantiated by his notebooks containing many revisions and additions, and by contemporary interviews. In a writing session in New York's Royalton Hotel, Cohen is famously said to have been reduced to sitting on the floor in his underwear, filling notebooks, banging his head on the floor. Dan Geller and Dayna Goldfine, creators of the 2022 documentary film Hallelujah: Leonard Cohen, A Journey, A Song, said that Cohen took about five years to write the song, and reconfigured it numerous times for performances.

Contrasting with the song's future popularity, "Hallelujah" initially was on an album that was rejected by Columbia Records, was largely ignored after an independent label released it, was not widely covered until John Cale's 1991 version, and did not reach the Billboard charts until Cohen's death in 2016. Reflecting on the song's initial rejection, Cohen related that Columbia told him that "we know you are great, but don't know if you are any good".

Following his original 1984 studio-album version, Cohen performed the original song on his world tour in 1985, but live performances during his 1988 and 1993 tours almost invariably contained a quite different set of lyrics. Numerous singers mix lyrics from both versions, and occasionally make direct lyric changes; for example, in place of Cohen's "holy dove", Canadian-American singer Rufus Wainwright substituted "holy dark", while Canadian singer-songwriter Allison Crowe sang "holy ghost".

== Musical composition and lyrical interpretation ==
Meaning of "Hallelujah"

This world is full of conflicts and full of things that cannot be reconciled. But there are moments when we can reconcile and embrace the whole mess, and that's what I mean by 'Hallelujah.'

— Leonard Cohen

"Hallelujah", in its original version, is in 12/8 time, which evokes both early rock and roll and gospel music. Written in the key of C major, the chord progression of C, F, G, A minor, F matches those referenced in the song's famous first verse.

When at age 50 Cohen first recorded the song, he described it as "rather joyous", and said that it came from "a desire to affirm my faith in life, not in some formal religious way, but with enthusiasm, with emotion." He later said "there is a religious hallelujah, but there are many other ones. When one looks at the world, there's only one thing to say, and it's hallelujah". Journalist Larry Sloman, who knew Cohen well and interviewed him often, described the song as one part biblical, one part the woman that Cohen slept with last night, citing an unidentified critic saying that Cohen was most interested in "holiness and horniness".

His original version, recorded on his 1984 album Various Positions, contains allusions to several biblical verses, including the stories of Samson and Delilah from the Book of Judges ("she cut your hair") as well as King David and Bathsheba ("you saw her bathing on the roof, her beauty and the moonlight overthrew you").

Cohen's lyrical poetry and his view that "many different hallelujahs exist" is reflected in wide-ranging covers with very different intents or tones, allowing the song to be "melancholic, fragile, uplifting [or] joyous" depending on the performer: The Welsh singer-songwriter John Cale, the first person to record a cover version of the song (in 1991), promoted a message of "soberness and sincerity" in contrast to Cohen's dispassionate tone; the cover by Jeff Buckley, an American singer-songwriter, is more sorrowful and was described by Buckley as "a hallelujah to the orgasm"; Crowe interpreted the song as a "very sexual" composition that discussed relationships; Wainwright offered a "purifying and almost liturgical" interpretation; and Guy Garvey of the British band Elbow made the hallelujah a "stately creature" and incorporated his religious interpretation of the song into his band's recordings. Noting its inclusion in the 2001 animated movie Shrek and performance in numerous singing competition reality shows, New York Times movie reviewer A. O. Scott wrote that "Hallelujah is one of those rare songs that survives its banalization with at least some of its sublimity intact".

Canadian singer k.d. lang said in an interview shortly after Cohen's death that she considered the song to be about "the struggle between having human desire and searching for spiritual wisdom. It's being caught between those two places." Former Barenaked Ladies frontman Steven Page, who sang the song at Canadian politician Jack Layton's funeral, described the song as being "about disappointing [other] people".

Where songs come from

Even Cohen, like the king in the song, was baffled by Hallelujah. He didn't want to explain it and decided he probably couldn't if he tried. He said: "If I knew where songs came from, I would go there more often."

— Xan Brooks, The Guardian

The song was the subject of a 2012 book, The Holy or the Broken: Leonard Cohen, Jeff Buckley & the Unlikely Ascent of 'Hallelujah'; author Alan Light said that Cohen's "approach to language and craft feel unlike the work of anybody else. They sound rooted in poetry and literature because he studied as a poet and a novelist first." The book served as the basis for the 2022 documentary film Hallelujah: Leonard Cohen, A Journey, A Song; the film's co-creator said that Cohen "addressed the deepest of our human concerns about longing for connection and longing for some sort of hope, transcendence and acknowledgment of the difficulties of life."

Financial Times arts and culture columnist Enuma Okoro wrote that "the lyrics and the tone of the song seem to sway between hymn and dirge, two musical forms that could serve as responses to almost everything that happens in our lives: songs that celebrate and acknowledge the blessings and provisions of our lives, and songs that bemoan our losses, our heartbreaks, and our deaths". Okoro noted that the word hallelujah is composed of two Hebrew words that mean "praise God", adding that Cohen said people have been "singing it for thousands of years to affirm our little journey".

== Charts ==
Chart (1985–2016)	Peak position
Australia (ARIA)	59
Austria (Ö3 Austria Top 40)	13
Canada Hot 100 (Billboard)	17
Czech Republic Singles Digital (ČNS IFPI)	65
Finland Download (Latauslista)	4
France (SNEP)	1
Germany (GfK)	27
Ireland (IRMA)	55
Italy (FIMI)	66
Netherlands (Single Top 100)	27
New Zealand Heatseekers (RMNZ)	1
Portugal (AFP)	69
Scottish Singles Sales (Official Charts)	30
Slovakia Singles Digital (ČNS IFPI)	58
Spain (Promusicae)	3
Sweden (Sverigetopplistan)	16
Switzerland (Schweizer Hitparade)	2
UK Singles (Official Charts)	36
US Billboard Hot 100	59
US Hot Rock & Alternative Songs (Billboard)	20

== Certifications ==
Region	Certification	Certified units/sales
Australia (ARIA)	Gold	35,000^{‡}
Denmark (IFPI Danmark)	Gold	45,000^{‡}
New Zealand (RMNZ)	Gold	7,500^{*}
United Kingdom (BPI)	Silver	200,000^{‡}
^{‡} Sales+streaming figures based on certification alone.

== Cover versions ==
Since 1991, "Hallelujah" has been performed by more than 300 singers in many languages. Statistics from the Recording Industry Association of America (RIAA), the Canadian Recording Industry Association, the Australian Recording Industry Association, and the International Federation of the Phonographic Industry, show that, by late 2008, more than five million copies of the song sold in CD format. It has been the subject of a BBC Radio documentary, a book, and been in the soundtracks of numerous films and television programs. Different interpretations of the song may include different verses, out of the more than 80 verses Cohen originally wrote.

In an April 2009 CBC Radio interview, Cohen said he found the number of covers of his song "ironic and amusing", given that his record label refused to release it when he first wrote it; however, he then claimed the song could benefit from a break in exposure:

I was just reading a review of a movie called Watchmen that uses it and the reviewer said – "Can we please have a moratorium on 'Hallelujah' in movies and television shows?" And I kind of feel the same way ... I think it's a good song, but I think too many people sing it.

Conversely, in early 2012, while promoting his then-current album, Old Ideas, Cohen stated he was not tired of the song being covered:

There's been a couple of times when other people have said can we have a moratorium please on "Hallelujah"? Must we have it at the end of every single drama and every single Idol? And once or twice I've felt maybe I should lend my voice to silencing it but on second thought no, I'm very happy that it's being sung.

=== John Cale ===
John Cale's cover first appeared on I'm Your Fan (1991), a Leonard Cohen tribute album, and later on his live album Fragments of a Rainy Season (1992). Cale's version has vocals, piano, and different lyrics that Cohen had only performed live such as "I used to live alone before I knew ya" and "All I ever learned from love was how to shoot at someone who outdrew ya". Cale had watched Cohen perform the song and asked Cohen to send him the lyrics. Cohen then faxed Cale 15 pages of lyrics. Cale claims that he "went through and just picked out the cheeky verses."

Cale's version forms the basis of most subsequent performances, including Cohen's performances during his 2008–09 world tour. Cale's version is used in the film Shrek (2001), but Rufus Wainwright's version appears on the soundtrack album. Cale's also appears on the first soundtrack album for the TV series Scrubs and as the ending song of the Cold Case episode "Death Penalty, Final Appeal".

=== Jeff Buckley ===
"Hallelujah"

Single by Jeff Buckley

from the album Grace
- Released: 22 May 2007
- Recorded: Late 1993–94
- Studio: Bearsville Studios (Woodstock, New York)
- Genre: Folk; alternative rock
- Length: 6:53
- Label: Columbia
- Songwriter: Leonard Cohen
- Producer: Andy Wallace

Jeff Buckley singles chronology
"Forget Her" (2004)	"Hallelujah" (2007)

Jeff Buckley, inspired by Cale's earlier cover, recorded one of the most acclaimed versions of "Hallelujah" for his only complete album, Grace, in 1994. It was released as a single in 2007, ten years after Buckley's death. In 2012, a limited edition vinyl single of Buckley and Cohen's versions released for Record Store Day.

==== Critical reception ====
In 2004, Buckley's version was ranked number 259 on Rolling Stone's "The 500 Greatest Songs of All Time". The same year Time called Buckley's version "exquisitely sung," observing "Cohen murmured the original like a dirge, but ... Buckley treated the ... song like a tiny capsule of humanity, using his voice to careen between glory and sadness, beauty and pain ... It's one of the great songs."

In September 2007, a poll of fifty songwriters conducted by the magazine Q listed "Hallelujah" among the all-time "Top 10 Greatest Tracks" with John Legend calling Buckley's version "as near perfect as you can get. The lyrics to 'Hallelujah' are just incredible and the melody's gorgeous and then there's Jeff's interpretation of it. It's one of the most beautiful pieces of recorded music I've ever heard." In July 2009, the Buckley track was ranked number three on the 2009 Triple J Hottest 100 of All Time, a listener poll held every decade by the Australian radio station Triple J. In 2017, The International Observer named Buckley's version of "Hallelujah" the greatest song of all time. On 2 April 2013, it was announced that Buckley's version would be inducted into the Library of Congress's National Recording Registry.

==== Commercial performance ====
Buckley's version was not an instant hit, nor did Buckley live to see the full measure of the reception his recording would ultimately have; he died in 1997. The album on which it appeared did not go gold in the US until 2002, nine years after its release.

"Hallelujah"

Single by Leonard Cohen & Jeff Buckley
- A-side: "Hallelujah"
- Written: 1979-88
- Released: 21 April 2012
- Recorded: June 1984; Late 1993–94
- Studio: Quadrasonic Sound Studios (Manhattan, New York); Bearsville Studios (Woodstock, New York)
- Genre: Rock; Blues; Folk; Alternative Rock

In fact, like Cohen's original, the Buckley version was not released as a single until much later, and it did not chart until 2006, posthumously for Buckley. In March of that year, Buckley had his first national top 10 best-seller when "Hallelujah" was at number seven in Norway. In 2007, it made the top 3 on the Swedish charts. In March 2008, it topped Billboard's Hot Digital Songs in the US after a performance of the song by Jason Castro in the seventh season of American Idol. The sudden resurgence of interest provided both Gold and Platinum status, the RIAA certifying the digital track on 22 April 2008. It has sold 1,144,000 digital copies in the US as of May 2010. It also hit number one in France in March 2008.

==== Usage in media ====
The Buckley version has been widely used in film and television dramas, including the movie Lord of War, the series The West Wing, Crossing Jordan, Without a Trace, The O.C., Third Watch, LAX, and Justiça. "Hallelujah can be joyous or bittersweet, depending on what part of it you use", Time quoted Buckley's publisher as saying. The magazine opined that its liberal use in some cases was "a tacit admission that neither the writers nor the actors could convey their characters' emotions as well as Buckley."

On 20 April 2013, Buckley's version of the song was played at Fenway Park during a tribute honoring the victims of the Boston Marathon bombing before the Red Sox played their first home game following the tragedy.

==== Charts ====
===== Weekly charts =====
Chart (2006–16)	Peak position
Australia (ARIA)	70
Austria (Ö3 Austria Top 40)	38
Canadian Digital Songs (Billboard)	2
European Hot 100 Singles	10
France (SNEP)	64
France Downloads Chart (SNEP)	1
Finland (Suomen virallinen lista)	14
Ireland (IRMA)	8
Italy (FIMI)	45
Netherlands (Single Top 100)	3
New Zealand (Recorded Music NZ)	22
Norway (VG-lista)	7
Sweden (Sverigetopplistan)	5
Switzerland (Schweizer Hitparade)	38
UK Singles (The Official Charts Company)	2
US Digital Songs (Billboard)	1

===== Year-end charts =====
Chart (2008)	Position
Sweden (Sverigetopplistan)	100

==== Certifications ====
Region	Certification	Certified units/sales
Australia (ARIA)	2× Platinum	140,000^{^}
Belgium (BRMA)	Gold	25,000^{*}
Canada (Music Canada)	2× Platinum	160,000^{‡}
Denmark (IFPI Danmark)	Platinum	90,000^{‡}
Germany (BVMI)	Gold	150,000^{‡}
Italy (FIMI)	Platinum	50,000^{‡}
New Zealand (RMNZ)	2× Platinum	60,000^{‡}
Spain (Promusicae)	Gold	30,000^{‡}
Sweden (GLF)	Gold	10,000^{^}
United Kingdom (BPI)	Platinum	600,000^{‡}
United States (RIAA)	2× Platinum	2,000,000^{‡}
^{*} Sales figures based on certification alone.^{^} Shipments figures based on certification alone.^{‡} Sales+streaming figures based on certification alone.

=== Rufus Wainwright ===
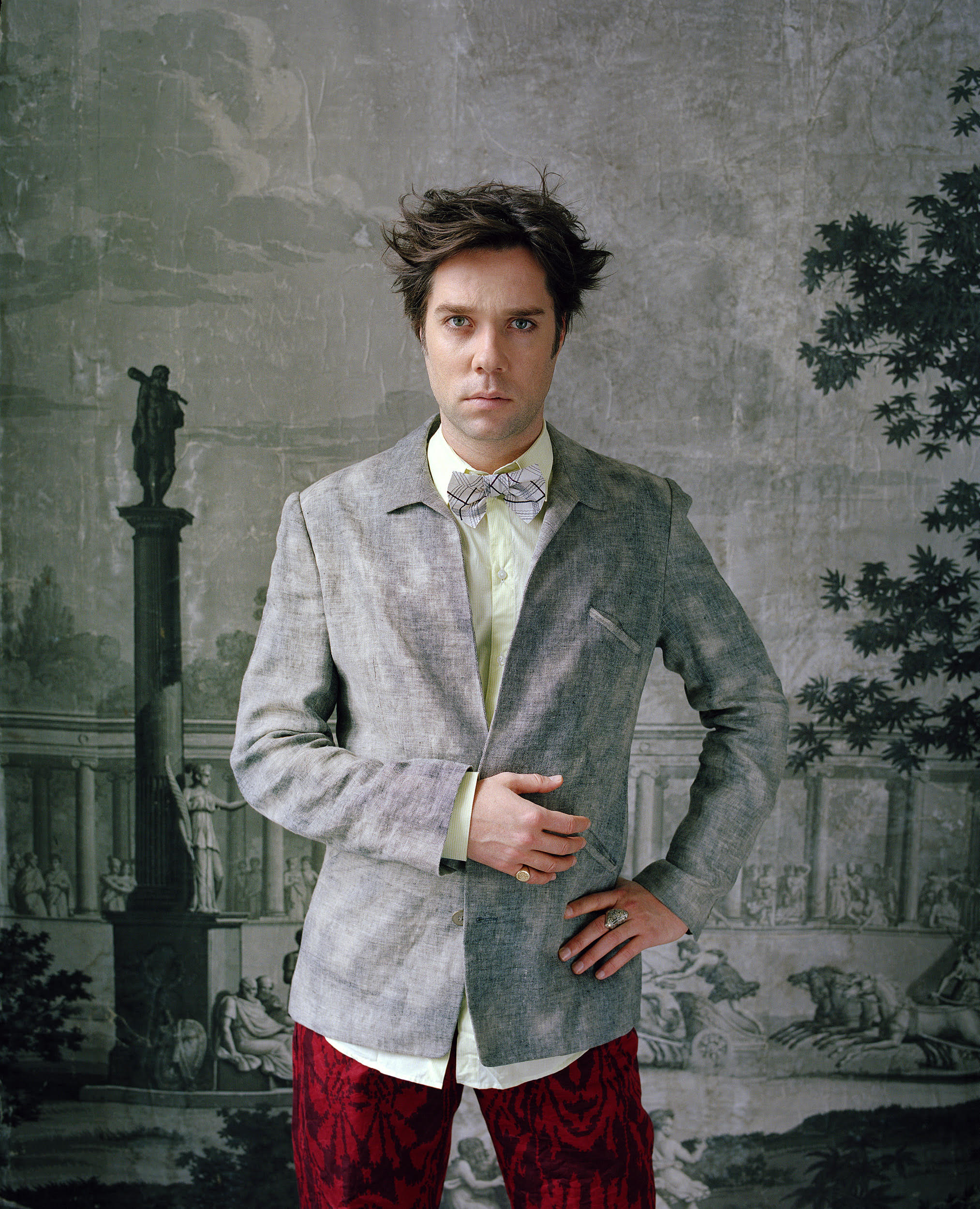
Wainwright in 2010

Canadian-American musician and singer Rufus Wainwright had briefly met Jeff Buckley and recorded a tribute song to him after his 1997 death. That song, "Memphis Skyline", referenced Buckley's version of "Hallelujah", which Wainwright would later record, though using piano and a similar arrangement to Cale's. Wainwright's version is included on the album Shrek: Music from the Original Motion Picture, although it was Cale's version that was used in the film itself. The Shrek soundtrack, containing Wainwright's cover, was certified 2× Platinum in the United States in 2003 as selling more than two million copies.

Wainwright, his sister Martha Wainwright, and Joan Wasser performed the song in the 2005 film Leonard Cohen: I'm Your Man.

In 2016, Wainwright recorded a version of the song with a chorus of 1,500 singers at a disused power station in Toronto.

==== Charts ====
Chart (2007–2010)	Peak position
UK Singles (Official Charts Company)	97
US Hot Rock and Alternative Songs (Billboard)	16
US Rock Digital Songs (Billboard)	11

==== Certifications ====
Region	Certification	Certified units/sales
New Zealand (RMNZ)	Gold	15,000^{‡}
United Kingdom (BPI)	Silver	200,000^{‡}
^{‡} Sales+streaming figures based on certification alone.

=== k.d. lang ===
In 2004, k.d. lang recorded a version of "Hallelujah" on her album Hymns of the 49th Parallel. She has since sung it at several major events, such as at the Canadian Juno Awards of 2005, where it "brought the audience to its feet for a two-minute ovation." Lang also sang it at the 2006 Canadian Songwriters Hall of Fame when Cohen was inducted into the Hall of Fame. Cohen's partner, singer Anjani Thomas, said: "After hearing k.d. lang perform that song at the Canadian Songwriter's Hall of Fame in 2006 we looked at each other and said, 'well, I think we can lay that song to rest now! It's really been done to its ultimate blissful state of perfection'." Lang sang it at the opening ceremony of the 2010 Winter Olympic Games in Vancouver, before a claimed TV audience of three billion. Lang's rendition of the song has been used several times in figure skating, notably by American skater Mariah Bell and Brazilian skater Isadora Williams.

Lang again performed the song at the 2017 Tower of Song: A Memorial Tribute to Leonard Cohen concert.

==== Charts ====
Chart (2010)	Peak position
Australia (ARIA)	13
Canada Hot 100 (Billboard)	2
Denmark (Tracklisten)	40
Netherlands (Single Top 100)	23
Norway (VG-lista)	11
Sweden (Sverigetopplistan)	12
Switzerland (Schweizer Hitparade)	21
US Billboard Hot 100	61

==== Certifications ====
Region	Certification	Certified units/sales
Canada (Music Canada)	Platinum	80,000^{*}
New Zealand (RMNZ)	Gold	15,000^{‡}
^{*} Sales figures based on certification alone.^{^} Shipments figures based on certification alone.

=== Alexandra Burke ===
"Hallelujah"

Single by Alexandra Burke

from the album Overcome
- B-side: "Candyman" (Live on The X Factor); "Without You" (Live on The X Factor)
- Released: 17 December 2008
- Recorded: 2008
- Genre: Pop; R&B
- Length: 3:39
- Label: Syco
- Songwriter: Leonard Cohen
- Producers: Quiz & Larossi

Alexandra Burke singles chronology
"Hero" (2008)	"Hallelujah" (2008)	"Bad Boys" (2009)

Music video
- "Hallelujah" on YouTube

On the 13 December 2008 finale, for the fifth series of the reality television show The X Factor, head-to-head finalists Alexandra Burke and group JLS each performed it as their final song before the winner's vote. Burke was voted the overall winner, and her condensed cover version of the song was immediately recorded and released as a prize for her victory. It reached Christmas number one on the UK Singles Chart on 21 December 2008.

Burke herself was not initially enamoured with the choice of song, saying "It just didn't do anything for me" and "I could not see a way to put my twist on it." After finding a way to perform it to her liking, however, she later realised "what a smart choice of song Simon Cowell made by picking Hallelujah. He managed to judge the mood and has selected the song of the year. I have grown to love it. Everyone seems to love it.”

==== Chart battle with other versions ====
The release of Burke's cover created interest in the previous versions of the song, including a Buckley fan campaign to take Buckley's cover to the top of the Christmas chart and therefore deny Burke the top spot. The campaign was fuelled by Buckley fans' dislike of The X Factor's commercialism and the song's arrangement, as well as their desire to introduce younger people to Buckley's version.

==== Commercial performance ====
Burke's version broke a European sales record after selling more than 105,000 digital downloads in just one day, breaking the previous record set by Leona Lewis. The song sold 576,000 copies in its first week, becoming the fastest-selling single released by a woman in the United Kingdom and the 2008 Christmas number one, while Buckley's cover charted at number two and Cohen's original version at number 36 on the same chart.

On 28 December 2008, the UK Singles Chart listed Burke's version as the biggest-selling single of the year, with NME announcing sales of more than one million copies since its release. This also made Burke the first ever female British artist to have a million-selling single in the UK. It has sold 1.330 million as of August 2016, making it the biggest-selling X Factor winner's single to date.

==== Charts ====
Chart (2008–17)	Peak position
Austria (Ö3 Austria Top 40)	53
Canada AC (Billboard)	15
Czech Republic Airplay (ČNS IFPI)	27
European Hot 100 Singles	6
France (SNEP)	175
Ireland (IRMA)	1
Scottish Singles Sales (Official Charts)	1
Slovenia (SloTop50)	25
UK Singles (Official Charts)	1

==== Year-end charts ====
Chart (2008)	Position
Ireland (IRMA)	2
UK Singles (OCC)	1

==== All-time charts ====
Chart	Position
Ireland (IRMA)	14

==== Certifications ====
Region	Certification	Certified units/sales
Germany (BVMI)	Gold	150,000^{‡}
United Kingdom (BPI)	3× Platinum	1,800,000^{‡}
^{‡} Sales+streaming figures based on certification alone.

=== Pentatonix ===
"Hallelujah"

Single by Pentatonix

from the album A Pentatonix Christmas
- Released: 21 October 2016
- Recorded: 2016
- Genre: A cappella
- Length: 4:28
- Label: RCA
- Songwriter: Leonard Cohen
- Producers: Pentatonix, Ben Bram

Pentatonix singles chronology
"Jolene" (2016)	"Hallelujah" (2016)	"Dancing On My Own" (2017)

Music video
- "Hallelujah" on YouTube

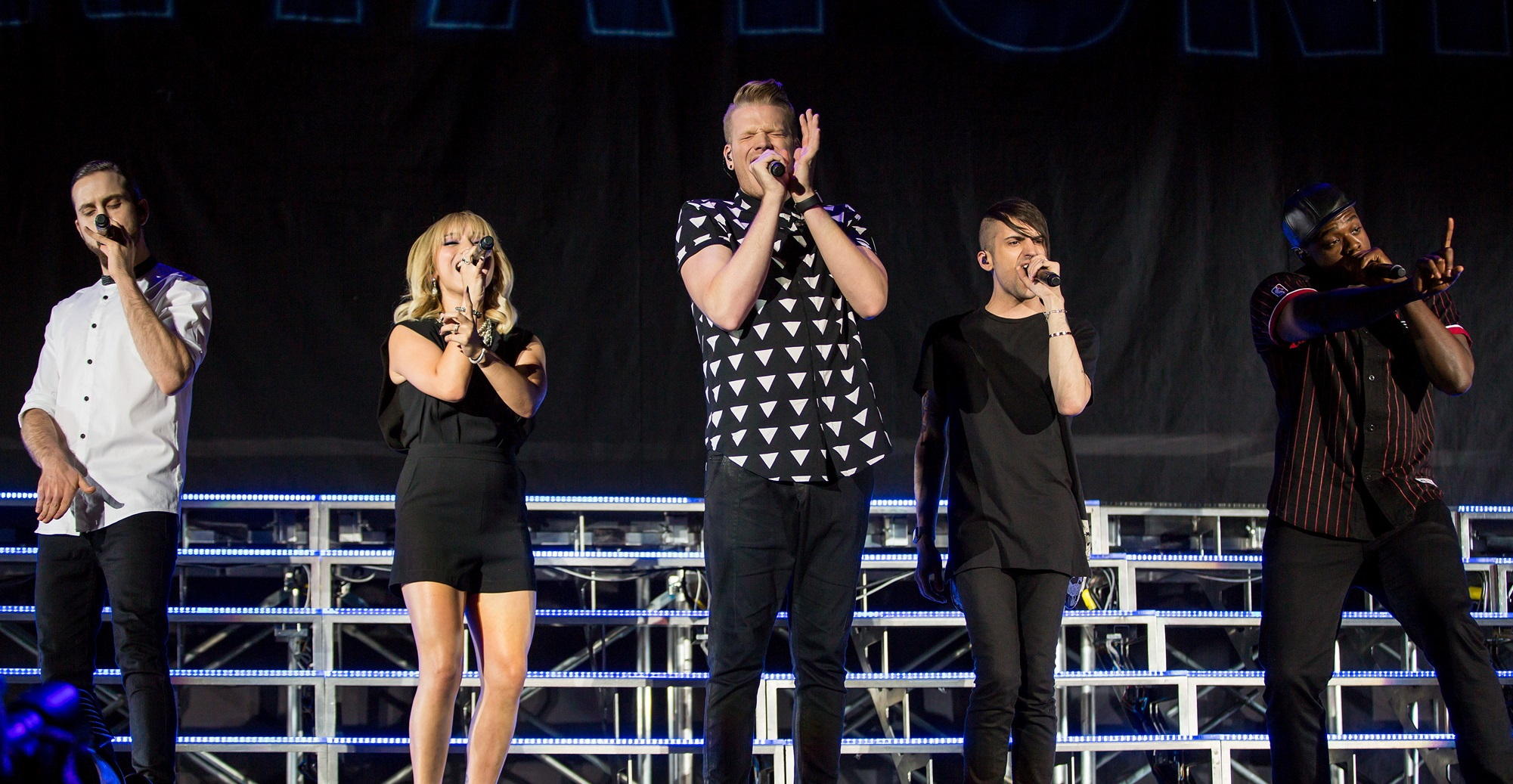
Pentatonix, 2015

The a cappella group Pentatonix covered the song in the quintet's 2016 album, A Pentatonix Christmas. On 21 October 2016, Pentatonix also released a music video for their cover filmed in the California Mojave Desert.

==== Weekly charts ====
Weekly chart performance for the Pentatonix cover of "Hallelujah"
Chart (2016–2025)	Peak position
Australia (ARIA)	52
Austria (Ö3 Austria Top 40)	1
Belgium (Ultratop 50 Flanders)	22
Belgium (Ultratip Bubbling Under Wallonia)	14
Canada Hot 100 (Billboard)	16
Czech Republic Singles Digital (ČNS IFPI)	55
France (SNEP)	20
Germany (GfK)	4
Global 200 (Billboard)	38
Greece International (IFPI)	64
Hungary (Single Top 40)	2
Ireland (IRMA)	67
Italy (FIMI)	18
Latvia (DigiTop100)	90
Lithuania (AGATA)	58
Netherlands (Global Top 40)	22
Netherlands (Single Top 100)	45
Netherlands (Tipparade)	20
Poland (Polish Streaming Top 100)	71
Portugal (AFP)	97
Slovakia Airplay (ČNS IFPI)	75
Slovakia Singles Digital (ČNS IFPI)	53
Spain (Promusicae)	23
Sweden (Sverigetopplistan)	35
Switzerland (Schweizer Hitparade)	7
UK Singles (Official Charts)	84
US Billboard Hot 100	23
US Adult Contemporary (Billboard)	4
US Holiday 100 (Billboard)	2
US Rolling Stone Top 100	68

==== Year-end charts ====
2016 year-end chart rankings for the Pentatonix cover of "Hallelujah"
Chart (2016)	Position
Hungary (Single Top 40)	71
Netherlands (Global Top 40)	97

==== Certifications ====
Region	Certification	Certified units/sales
Australia (ARIA)	Platinum	70,000^{‡}
Canada (Music Canada)	3× Platinum	240,000^{‡}
Denmark (IFPI Danmark)	Platinum	90,000^{‡}
France (SNEP)	Gold	100,000^{‡}
Germany (BVMI)	3× Gold	600,000^{‡}
Italy (FIMI)	Platinum	50,000^{‡}
New Zealand (RMNZ)	Platinum	30,000^{‡}
Portugal (AFP)	Gold	12,000^{‡}
Spain (Promusicae)	Gold	30,000^{‡}
Switzerland (IFPI Switzerland)	Platinum	30,000^{‡}
United Kingdom (BPI)	Silver	200,000^{‡}
United States (RIAA)	Gold	500,000^{‡}
^{‡} Sales+streaming figures based on certification alone.

=== Other cover versions ===
It's a beautifully constructed melody that steps up, evolves, and slips back, all in quick time. But this song has a connective chorus, which when it comes in has a power all of its own. The 'secret chord' and the point-blank I-know-you-better-than-you-know-yourself aspect of the song has plenty of resonance for me.

— Bob Dylan

Bob Dylan was among the first to perform Cohen's song in concert with his earliest noted performance being in Montreal on 8 July 1988. Other notable singers who have covered "Hallelujah" include Brandi Carlile, Regina Spektor, Willie Nelson, Susan Boyle, Tim Minchin, Myles Kennedy, and Bono. Bono's version, which is mostly spoken, was included in Tower of Song: The Songs of Leonard Cohen, an all-star tribute to Cohen in 1995. Bon Jovi has covered the song several times in concert, including on their 2008 Live at Madison Square Garden DVD.

In 2006, the Norwegian quartet of Espen Lind, Kurt Nilsen, Alejandro Fuentes and Askil Holm released a cover of the song. After debuting at number 8 on the Norwegian VG-lista, the single reached number one in January 2007. The song remained listed on the Norwegian top 20 for 37 (non-consecutive) weeks between 2006 and 2007. The song also appears on the 2006 album Hallelujah Live, credited to Lind with Nilsen, Fuentes and Holm, which also reached the top of the Norwegian VG-lista.

International group Il Divo released a Spanish-language adaptation with different lyrics on their album The Promise (2008), which topped the charts in the UK. The song was performed by recording artist Damien Rice at the 2008 Rock and Roll Hall of Fame inductions when Cohen was inducted. That same year Welsh mezzo-soprano Katherine Jenkins recorded a classical-crossover version for her album Sacred Arias. Kate Voegele performed it in character as Mia Catalano in the US teen drama One Tree Hill. Also appearing on an album, her version made the Hot 100 Billboard charts and reached number 53 in the UK shortly after airing of the episode there. Also in 2008, the Welsh band Brigyn released a version in Welsh. In 2009 Swedish artist Ebba Forsberg released a version sung in Swedish.

The song has become a staple of television talent shows. Jason Castro, an American Idol season 7 contestant, performed a version on 4 March 2008, which propelled Jeff Buckley's version of the song to the top of the Billboard digital song chart. His version was included in his self-titled debut album and his second studio album, Who I Am. Lisa Hordijk, winner of the 2009 Dutch X Factor, released "Hallelujah" as her debut single, which went double platinum and remained at the top of the Dutch charts for ten weeks.

A 2009 hit by Orthodox Jewish singer Ohad Moskowitz, "Bo'i Kala", featuring the words of the traditional tune accompanying a Jewish bride to the chuppah, is a musical adaptation of "Hallelujah".

On 22 January 2010, American musicians Justin Timberlake, Matt Morris, and Charlie Sexton performed a live cover version of "Hallelujah" during the Hope for Haiti Now telethon in support of those affected by the 2010 Haiti earthquake. A recorded version was released the following day on the Hope for Haiti Now soundtrack album and reached a peak of number 13 on the Billboard Hot 100 chart.

On 16 April 2010, the Edmonton Symphony Orchestra and the Richard Eaton Singers conducted by Jack Everly premiered a new arrangement for orchestra and chorus by Claude Lapalme. Also in 2010, the Maccabeats of Yeshiva University released Voices from the Heights, with an a cappella version of "Hallelujah" set to the Hebrew words of the Shabbat liturgical poem "Lecha Dodi".

Canadian singer Kelley Mooney was asked by her parish priest to perform the song for Easter mass but she discovered the lyrics were inappropriate, so she wrote new lyrics about the crucifixion and resurrection of Jesus. In 2008, after two years of trying, she received permission from Cohen to perform the song with new lyrics. Her performance in 2010 with a children's choir received 1.4 million views on YouTube and also appeared on GodTube. Mooney released a CD, Tomorrow, in 2011 which included her version of "Hallelujah", and her version was number three on the Billboard Christian digital downloads chart in 2014, the same year the video reached 6.5 million views on GodTube as of Easter.

Steven Page performed the song live at the state funeral of Canadian Opposition Leader Jack Layton on 27 August 2011.

Raul Esparza performed the song live at the Kennedy Center's 11 September Memorial Concert on 8 September 2011.

Sephira (also known as Sephira - The Irish Rock Violinists), the Irish sister violin duo, recorded and released a version of Leonard Cohen's "Hallelujah" in 2011 on their Starlight Christmas album, with the track later featured on their 2013 Eternity EP. Known for their synchronized violin performances and distinct Celtic sibling harmonies, Sephira's rendition of "Hallelujah" combines classical violin instrumentation with rich vocal harmonies, offering a unique interpretation of the iconic song. Their version has been performed for royalty at various special events and continues to resonate with audiences worldwide.

In May 2012, Canada's Royal Winnipeg Ballet presented the World Premiere of The Doorway – Scenes from Leonard Cohen, created and choreographed by Jorden Morris – with "Hallelujah" performed by Allison Crowe (voice and piano) and ballerinas Sophia Lee and Jo-Ann Gudilin dancing alternate dates.

On the 17 December 2012 episode of The Voice, the song was covered in tribute to the victims of the Sandy Hook Elementary School shooting by coaches Christina Aguilera, Adam Levine, Blake Shelton and Cee Lo Green.

American actor, comedian and musician Adam Sandler performed an off-colour parody of "Hallelujah" in December 2012 at Madison Square Garden in New York City as part of 12-12-12: The Concert for Sandy Relief, with Paul Shaffer on piano. Sandler's version contained numerous references to Hurricane Sandy and contemporary events in local culture, sports and politics.

Contemporary Christian band Cloverton recorded the song with altered, more explicitly Christian lyrics as "A Hallelujah Christmas" in 2014.

Singer Tori Kelly recorded a cover of "Hallelujah" for the animated film Sing and has done two notable live performances of the song: during the "In Memoriam" portion of the 68th Primetime Emmy Awards, and alongside Luis Fonsi during the 2017 Hand in Hand: A Benefit for Hurricane Relief telethon. In August 2020, Cohen fans were incensed when Kelly's recording was played after Donald Trump's speech at the Republican National Convention. A legal representative for the Cohen estate said they had "specifically declined the RNC's use request" for "one of the most important songs in the Cohen song catalogue". She added that the estate might have approved the use of Cohen's "You Want It Darker".

On 12 November 2016, an episode of Saturday Night Live opened with cast member Kate McKinnon as Hillary Clinton performing a rendition of the song in tribute to both Cohen and Clinton. The preceding week had seen both Cohen's death and Clinton's loss to Donald Trump in the 2016 US presidential election.

In November 2016, Klezmer musician Daniel Kahn released a Yiddish version, with lyrics translated by Kahn, Michael Alpert, Mendy Cahan, and Josh Waletzky. The Forward published the video to its website and YouTube channel.

Linkin Park frontman Chester Bennington sang "Hallelujah" during his eulogy to Chris Cornell at Hollywood Forever Cemetery on 26 May 2017.

The American alt-right conspiracy theorist and comedian Owen Benjamin used the music of "Hallelujah" with new lyrics in his song titled "How They Rule Ya" in support of freeing British far-right activist Tommy Robinson, who was held at the time for contempt of court charges for violating a press gag order, encouraging vigilante action against and illegally filming some of the defendants in the trial of the Huddersfield grooming gang. Released on 12 June 2018 under the alternative title "Free Tommy Robinson", it charted in the UK iTunes Charts. Robinson as a tribute and gratitude to Owen Benjamin, upon his release led the crowd outside the Old Bailey to a rendition of the song written by Benjamin.

At a national remembrance in January 2021 for those killed by the COVID-19 pandemic in the United States, Yolanda Adams sang a slightly modified two verses of "Hallelujah", changing "Maybe there's a God above" to "I know that there's a God above". A number of American Jews criticized the performance, as they had a usage of the song at the end of the 2020 Republican National Convention, for ignoring the song's lyrics about sexuality and questioning one's faith.

== Inclusions in film, television and events ==
- American Idol
- America's Got Talent
- Basquiat
- Cold Case
- Criminal Minds
- Crossing Jordan
- CSI
- COVID memorial service (Washington, 2021)
- Dancing with the Stars
- Elizabeth II's 2022 memorial ceremony in Ottawa
- ER
- General Hospital
- Hope for Haiti Now concert
- House
- I Can Only Imagine
- Zack Snyder's Justice League
- LAX
- Longmire
- Lord of War
- NCIS
- Notre-Dame re-opening
- Numbers
- The O.C.
- Olympics opening ceremony (Vancouver)
- One Tree Hill
- Saint Ralph
- Saturday Night Live
- Scrubs
- Sense8
- Shrek
- Sing
- The Sing-Off
- So You Think You Can Dance
- Third Watch
- Trauma
- True Blood
- Watchmen
- The West Wing
- White House state dinner
- Without a Trace
- The X Factor
- The Young Pope
- 12-12-12: The Concert for Sandy Relief

== Accolades and achievements ==
- The BBC commemorated the 25th anniversary of the first recording of "Hallelujah" with an hour-long radio documentary, The Fourth, The Fifth, The Minor Fall, broadcast on 1 November 2008, in which the song's history and numerous cover versions were presented and discussed.
- The song was named one of the top ten greatest tracks of all time in a poll of songwriters conducted by the British music magazine Q.
- Rolling Stone magazine listed the song as one of the 500 greatest songs.
- In the February 2009 issue of Blender, "Hallelujah" was named that month's "Greatest Song Ever" (a monthly feature).
- In 2005, "Hallelujah" was named the tenth-greatest Canadian song of all time in Chart magazine's annual readers' poll.
- On 21 December 2008, "Hallelujah" became the first song in 51 years to hold the top two positions on the UK Singles Chart; The X Factor winner Alexandra Burke's and American singer Jeff Buckley's covers were the two highest-selling songs in the week beginning 15 December 2008. Leonard Cohen's version was number 36 in the same chart.
- In 2014, "Hallelujah" was ranked number 1 in Rolling Stone's "Best Leonard Cohen Songs" readers' poll.
- American Songwriter ranked the song number 1 on their list of the 10 greatest Leonard Cohen songs.
- Cohen's original version was ranked number 74 on the 2021 edition of "Top 500 Songs of All Time" by Rolling Stone magazine.

== Other charted versions ==
Covering Artist(s)	Year	Peak chart positions														Certifications
Covering Artist(s)	Year	AUS	AUT	BEL (FL)	BEL (WA)	CAN	DEN	EU	FRA	NL	NZ	SWE	SWI	UK	US	Certifications
Bon Jovi	2008	—	29	—	—	—	—	—	—	—	—	—	—	177	—	
Kate Voegele	2008	—	—	—	—	—	—	—	—	—	—	—	—	53	68	
Lisa Lois	2009	—	—	—	—	—	—	99	—	1	—	—	—	—	—	
Justin Timberlake and Matt Morris featuring Charlie Sexton	2010	—	22	25	31	5	37	—	—	—	8	10	—	91	13	
Natalia and Gabriel Ríos	2010	—	—	1	6	—	—	81	—	—	—	—	—	—	—	BEA: Platinum
Karise Eden	2012	2	—	—	—	—	—	—	—	—	35	—	—	—	—	ARIA: Platinum
Bastian Baker	2012	—	—	—	—^{[A]}	—	—	—	18	—	—	—	24	—	—	
Matthew Schuler	2013	—	—	—	—	—	—	—	—	—	—	—	—	—	40	
Xavier Naidoo	2014	—	20	—	—	—	—	—	—	—	—	—	36	—	—	

Notes

- A Bastian Baker's version of "Hallelujah" did not enter the Ultratop 50, but peaked at No. 5 on the Wallonia Ultratip chart.
