= Summerfling =

2000 single by k.d. lang

Single by k.d. lang

from the album Invincible Summer
- B-side: "Constant Craving" (live)
- Released: June 19, 2000
- Studio: Conway (Los Angeles)
- Genre: Pop
- Length: 4:16
- Label: Warner Bros.
- Songwriters: k.d. lang; David Piltch
- Producers: k.d. lang; Damian LeGassick

K.d. lang singles chronology
"Anywhere but Here" (1999)	"Summerfling" (2000)	"The Consequences of Falling" (2000)

"Summerfling" is a song by Canadian singer-songwriter k.d. lang. It was released in June 2000 as the first single from her fifth solo album, Invincible Summer (2000). It peaked at number 83 on the UK Singles Chart and number 16 on the US Billboard Maxi-Singles Sales chart. The music video for the song was directed by Liz Friedlander.

== Critical reception ==
Professional ratings
Review scores
Source	Rating
AllMusic	4/5 stars

Jose F. Promis of AllMusic gave the single 4 out of 5 stars, writing: "This is the type of seminal recording that, since it was never a hit upon initial release, deserves to be rediscovered by a music supervisor and used in a film -- it's that good, and it's a true shame that something as timeless and lovely as this ditty can't muster enough muscle to dent the U.S. pop charts." Jay Lustig of NJ.com called it "a quintessential summertime song -- warm, relaxed and effortlessly catchy."

== Track listings ==
- US maxi-CD single
1. "Summerfling" (Victor Calderone extended vocal remix) – 8:57
2. "Summerfling" (Wamdue's Summer Bliss extended mix) – 6:27
3. "Summerfling" (Ananda's Sweet Bird of Summer extended mix) – 8:40
4. "Summerfling" (Victor Calderone dub version) – 5:59
5. "Summerfling" (Wamdue's Makin' Me High dub) – 5:25
6. "Summerfling" (Ananda's Sweet Dub of Summer) – 7:18
7. "Summerfling" (album version) – 4:16
- US 12-inch vinyl single

A1. "Summerfling" (Victor Calderone extended vocal remix) – 8:57
A2. "Summerfling" (Victor Calderone dub version) – 5:59
B1. "Summerfling" (Wamdue's Summer Bliss extended mix) – 6:27
B2. "Summerfling" (Wamdue's Makin' Me High dub) – 5:25

- UK CD single
1. "Summerfling" (radio edit) – 3:52
2. "Summerfling" (Propellerheads mix) – 3:48
3. "Constant Craving" (live in Sydney) – 5:45
- Australian maxi-CD single
1. "Summerfling" (radio edit) – 3:52
2. "Summerfling" (Calderone radio mix) – 4:10
3. "Summerfling" (Propellerheads mix) – 3:49
4. "Constant Craving" (live in Sydney) – 5:37
5. "Summerfling" (extended vocal mix) – 8:57

== Charts ==
Chart (2000)	Peak position
Australia (ARIA)	124
Scottish Singles Sales (Official Charts)	92
UK Singles (Official Charts)	83
US Adult Alternative Airplay (Billboard)	28
US Dance Club Songs (Billboard)	25
US Dance Singles Sales (Billboard)	16

== Release history ==
Region	Date	Format(s)	Label(s)	Ref(s).
United States	June 19, 2000	Adult contemporary; hot adult contemporary; modern adult contemporary radio	Warner Bros.	
United Kingdom	July 17, 2000	CD	Warner Bros.	
