= A Truly Western Experience =

Studio album by k.d. lang and the Reclines
- Released: 1984
- Studio: Homestead Recorders, Edmonton, Alberta
- Genre: Alternative country
- Length: 26:20
- Label: Bumstead
- Producer: k.d. lang, Gaye Delorme, Jamie Kidd

k.d. lang and the Reclines chronology
A Truly Western Experience (1984)	Angel with a Lariat (1987)

Professional ratings
Review scores
Source	Rating
AllMusic	3/5 stars
The Rolling Stone Album Guide	2/5 stars

A Truly Western Experience is the debut album by k.d. lang and the Reclines, released in 1984.

The album was re-released in February 2010, with bonus tracks and a DVD with rare videos.

== Track listing ==
1. "Bopalena" (Webb Pierce, Mel Tillis) – 2:30
2. "Pine and Stew" (lang) – 3:25
3. "Up to Me" (Stewart MacDougall) – 3:06
4. "Tickled Pink" (Dave Bjarnason, lang, Stewart MacDougall, Gordie Matthews, Farley Scott) – 3:22
5. "Hanky Panky" (Dave Bjarnason, lang, Stewart MacDougall, Gordie Matthews, Farley Scott) – 1:59
6. "There You Go" (Durwood Haddock, Eddie Miller, W.S. Stevenson) – 2:23
7. "Busy Being Blue" (Stewart MacDougall) – 4:00
8. "Stop, Look and Listen" (George London, W.S. Stevenson) – 2:13
9. "Hooked on Junk" (Edward Elgar) – 3:35

== Personnel ==
- k.d. lang – acoustic guitar, vocals, cover design
- Dave Bjarnason – drums
- Jamie Kidd – organ
- Gary Koliger – steel guitar
- Stewart MacDougall – piano, vocals
- Gordie Matthews – guitar, slide guitar
- Farley Scott – bass
- Michael Shellard, Ian Oscar – backing vocals

== Production ==
- Producers: k.d. lang, Gaye Delorme, Jamie Kidd
- Engineer: Jamie Kidd
- Cover design: k.d. lang

== Sales ==
Region	Certification	Certified units/sales
Canada	—	35,000
