= Angel with a Lariat =

Studio album by k.d. lang and the Reclines
- Released: April 11, 1987
- Recorded: May 26–June 27, 1986
- Studios: Maison Rouge, Fulham Broadway, London
- Genres: Alternative country; cowpunk
- Length: 30:52
- Labels: Sire, Warner Bros.
- Producer: Dave Edmunds

k.d. lang chronology
A Truly Western Experience (1984)	Angel with a Lariat (1987)	Shadowland (1988)

Professional ratings
Review scores
Source	Rating
AllMusic	3.5/5 stars
Mojo	3/5 stars
The Rolling Stone Album Guide	3.5/5 stars

Angel with a Lariat is the second album by k.d. lang and the Reclines, released on April 11, 1987. This was the first release outside of Canada.

== Track listing ==
1. "Turn Me Round" (Ben Mink) – 3:13
2. "High Time for a Detour" (lang, Mink) – 4:09
3. "Diet of Strange Places" (lang) – 3:53
4. "Got the Bull by the Horns" (Amos Boyd, Billy Jones) – 3:03
5. "Watch Your Step Polka" (Teddy Borowiecki, lang, Dennis Marcenko, Gordie Matthews) – 2:01
6. "Rose Garden" (Joe South) – 3:19
7. "Tune into My Wave" (Mink) – 3:32
8. "Angel with a Lariat" (lang) – 3:08
9. "Pay Dirt" (lang) – 2:09
10. "Three Cigarettes in an Ashtray" (Eddie Miller, W. S. Stevenson) – 2:25

== Personnel ==
- k.d. lang – vocals, backing vocals

The Reclines

- Teddy Borowiecki – accordion, keyboard, backing vocals
- Dennis Marcenko – bass, backing vocals
- Gordie Matthews – guitar, backing vocals
- Ben Mink – guitar, electric mandolin, violin, backing vocals
- Michel Pouliot – drums, backing vocals

Additional personnel

- B.J. Cole – steel guitar on "Diet of Strange Places"
- Roy Dodds – drums on "Three Cigarettes in an Ashtray"
- Dave Edmunds – additional acoustic guitar on "Turn Into My Wave", backing vocals
- Keith Nelson – banjo on "Turn Me Round" and "High Time For a Detour"
- Anne Dudley – string arrangement on "Three Cigarettes in an Ashtray"

== Production ==
- Dave Edmunds – producer
- Carey Taylor – engineer
- Jeri McManus Heiden, Kim Champagne, k.d. lang – art direction
- Amy Vangsgard – 3-D cover illustration

== Chart performance ==
Chart (1987)	Peak position
Canada Top Albums/CDs (RPM)	40
US Top Country Albums (Billboard)	53

== Certifications ==
Certifications for Angel with a Lariat
Region	Certification	Certified units/sales
Canada (Music Canada)	Gold	50,000^{^}
^{^} Shipments figures based on certification alone.
