= Invincible Summer =

Studio album by k.d. lang
- Released: June 20, 2000
- Studio: Conway Recording Studios (Los Angeles, CA)
- Length: 42:08
- Label: Warner Bros.
- Producer: David Kahne; Damian LeGassick

K.d. lang chronology
Drag (1997)	Invincible Summer (2000)	Live by Request (2001)

Professional ratings
Aggregate scores
Source	Rating
Metacritic	61/100
Review scores
Source	Rating
Allmusic	3/5 stars
The A.V. Club	(unfavorable)
Billboard	(favorable)
Entertainment Weekly	B−
Los Angeles Times	3/4 stars
Mojo	4/5 stars
Q	2/5 stars
Robert Christgau	(neither)
Rolling Stone	3/5 stars
Wall of Sound	(41/100)

Invincible Summer is the fifth solo album by k.d. lang, released by Warner Bros. Records in 2000. The album's title derives from a quote by Albert Camus: "In the depths of winter, I finally learned that within me there lay an invincible summer."

== Critical reception ==
In an Allmusic review, Stacia Proefrock wrote "Glowing with happiness and lovey bliss, this lush album is dripping with the kind of bright, slick production that hasn't seen much light since the Brill Building's heyday. Swelling strings, electronic bubbles and warbles, and the occasional mandolin combine to create a sound that manages to evoke a warm feeling of nostalgia without sounding retro. Topping it all off is lang's smooth-as-maple-syrup voice, which shows even greater range than before."

In a three-and-a-half star Rolling Stone review, James Hunter wrote "On 'Invincible Summer,' k.d. lang reorchestrates the relaxed loveliness of Sixties Southern California pop and, to a lesser extent, Brazilian music...The music is often quick-paced fluff with the retro exactness, and the soul, of a Pottery Barn sofa. But for the most part, lang's lighter musical tack encourages her to retire the galloping self-regard that can cancel the attractiveness of her voice."

== Track listing ==
No.	Title	Writer(s)	Length
1.	"The Consequences of Falling"	Marie-Claire D'Ubaldo, Rick Nowels, Billy Steinberg	3:52
2.	"Summerfling"	k.d. lang, David Piltch	4:15
3.	"Suddenly"	Lang, Piltch	3:32
4.	"It's Happening With You"	Lang, Piltch	2:48
5.	"Extraordinary Thing"	Abe Laboriel, Jr., Abraham Laboriel, Lang	3:35
6.	"Love's Great Ocean"	Lang, Ben Mink	5:40
7.	"Simple"	Lang, Piltch	2:44
8.	"What Better Said"	Lang, Abe Laboriel, Jr.	3:47
9.	"When We Collide"	Lang, Abe Laboriel, Jr.	4:22
10.	"Curiosity"	Lang	3:41
11.	"Only Love"	Lang	3:52

== Personnel ==
- k.d. lang - vocals
- Rusty Anderson - guitar
- Wendy Melvoin - guitar
- Smokey Hormel - guitar
- Jon Stewart - guitar
- Rick Baptist - trumpet
- Teddy Borowiecki - accordion, keyboard
- Denyse Buffum - viola
- Larry Corbett - cello
- Mario de Leon - violin
- Joel Derouin - violin
- John Friesen - cello
- John Fumo - trumpet
- Armen Garabedian - violin
- Berj Garabedian - violin
- Jon Hassell - trumpet
- Suzie Katayama - cello
- Peter Kent - violin
- Abe Laboriel Jr. - drums, vocals
- Abraham Laboriel - bass, guitar, vocals
- Damian LeGassick - guitar, keyboard
- Greg Leisz - pedal steel
- Gayle Levant - harp
- Jon Lewis - trumpet
- Ben Mink - violin, keyboard, viola
- Vicki Miskolczy - viola
- Bob Peterson - violin
- David Piltch - bass, guitar, mandolin, cornet, keyboard, human whistle, loop, Moog bass, baritone guitar
- Daniel Smith - cello
- David Stenske - viola
- John Wittenberg - violin

== Production ==
- Producers: David Kahne, Damian LeGassick
- Engineers: Jason Mauza, John Smith
- Assistant engineers: Andy Ackland, Tony Flores, James Stone
- Mixing: Rob Brill, David Kahne, Johnny "Hammond" Smith
- Mastering: Bob Ludwig
- Digital editing: Eric White
- Drum programming: Eric White
- Brass arrangement: Damian LeGassick
- String arrangements: Damian LeGassick, Ben Mink
- Vocal arrangement: Alex Gifford
- Art direction: Jeri Heiden, John Heiden
- Design: Jeri Heiden, John Heiden
- Photography: Just Loomis

== Charts ==
=== Weekly charts ===
Chart (2000)	Peak position
Australian Albums (ARIA)	12
New Zealand Albums (RMNZ)	45
UK Albums Chart	17
United States Billboard 200^{[A]}	58

== Certifications ==
Region	Certification	Certified units/sales
Australia (ARIA)	Gold	35,000^{^}
^{^} Shipments figures based on certification alone.

- A In the United States, Invincible Summer also entered the Top Internet Albums chart, peaking at #9 there.
