= Absolute Torch and Twang =

Studio album by k.d. lang and the Reclines
- Released: 1989
- Studio: Vancouver Studios (Vancouver, BC)
- Genre: Alternative country
- Length: 41:31
- Label: Sire, Warner Bros.
- Producer: Greg Penny, k.d. lang, Ben Mink

k.d. lang chronology
Shadowland (1988)	Absolute Torch and Twang (1989)	Ingénue (1992)

Absolute Torch and Twang is the third album by k.d. lang and the Reclines, released in 1989.

== Critical reception ==
Professional ratings
Review scores
Source	Rating
AllMusic	5/5 stars
Chicago Sun-Times	3.5/4 stars
Chicago Tribune	3/4 stars
Los Angeles Times	3.5/5 stars
NME	7/10
Q	4/5 stars
Record Mirror	5/5
Rolling Stone	4/5 stars
The Rolling Stone Album Guide	4/5 stars
The Village Voice	B+

Fred Dellar of Hi-Fi News & Record Review gave the best rating to the album and said that "Canuck has fashioned yet another album that crosses borderlines and blends various aspects of country music with the sounds stemming from a late night, 40's jukebox".

== Track listing ==
All tracks written by k.d. lang and Ben Mink, except where noted.

No.	Title	Music	Length
1.	"Luck in My Eyes"		4:10
2.	"Three Days"	Willie Nelson	3:17
3.	"Trail of Broken Hearts"		3:24
4.	"Big Boned Gal"		3:08
5.	"Didn't I"		3:39
6.	"Walflower Waltz"		4:22
7.	"Full Moon Full of Love"	Leroy Preston; Jeannie Smith	2:49
8.	"Pullin' Back the Reins"		4:23
9.	"Big, Big Love"	Kenneth Carroll; Wynn Stewart	2:29
10.	"It's Me"		2:20
11.	"Walkin' in and Out of Your Arms"		3:03
12.	"Nowhere to Stand"	k.d. lang	4:27
Total length:			41:31

== Personnel ==
Musicians

- k.d. lang – acoustic guitar, guitar, vocals
- Graham Boyle – percussion, tambourine, claves, spoons
- Michael Creber – piano
- John Dymond – bass
- The Five Blind Boys of Alabama – background vocals, voices
- Greg Leisz – steel guitar, slide guitar
- Gordie Matthews – acoustic guitar, guitar, electric guitar
- Ben Mink – organ, acoustic guitar, guitar, mandolin, strings, violin, electric guitar, mandola, bowed bass
- David Piltch – fretless bass, bowed bass
- Michel Pouliot – drums
- Ed Thigpen – drums

== Production ==
- Producers: Greg Penny, k.d. lang, Ben Mink

== Chart performance ==
=== Weekly charts ===
Chart (1989–1990)	Peak position
Australian Albums (ARIA)	81
Canadian Albums (RPM)	29
Canadian Country Albums (RPM)	8
US Billboard 200	69
US Top Country Albums (Billboard)	12

=== Year-end charts ===
Chart (1989)	Position
US Top Country Albums (Billboard)	44
Chart (1990)	Position
US Top Country Albums (Billboard)	16

== Certifications ==
Region	Certification	Certified units/sales
Australia (ARIA)	Gold	35,000^{^}
Canada (Music Canada)	Platinum	100,000^{^}
United Kingdom (BPI)	Silver	60,000^{^}
United States (RIAA)	Gold	500,000^{^}
^{^} Shipments figures based on certification alone.

== Awards ==
Grammy Awards

Year	Winner	Category
1989	Absolute Torch and Twang	Best Female Country Vocal Performance
