= K.d. lang =

Canadian musician (born 1961)

k.d. lang OC AOE
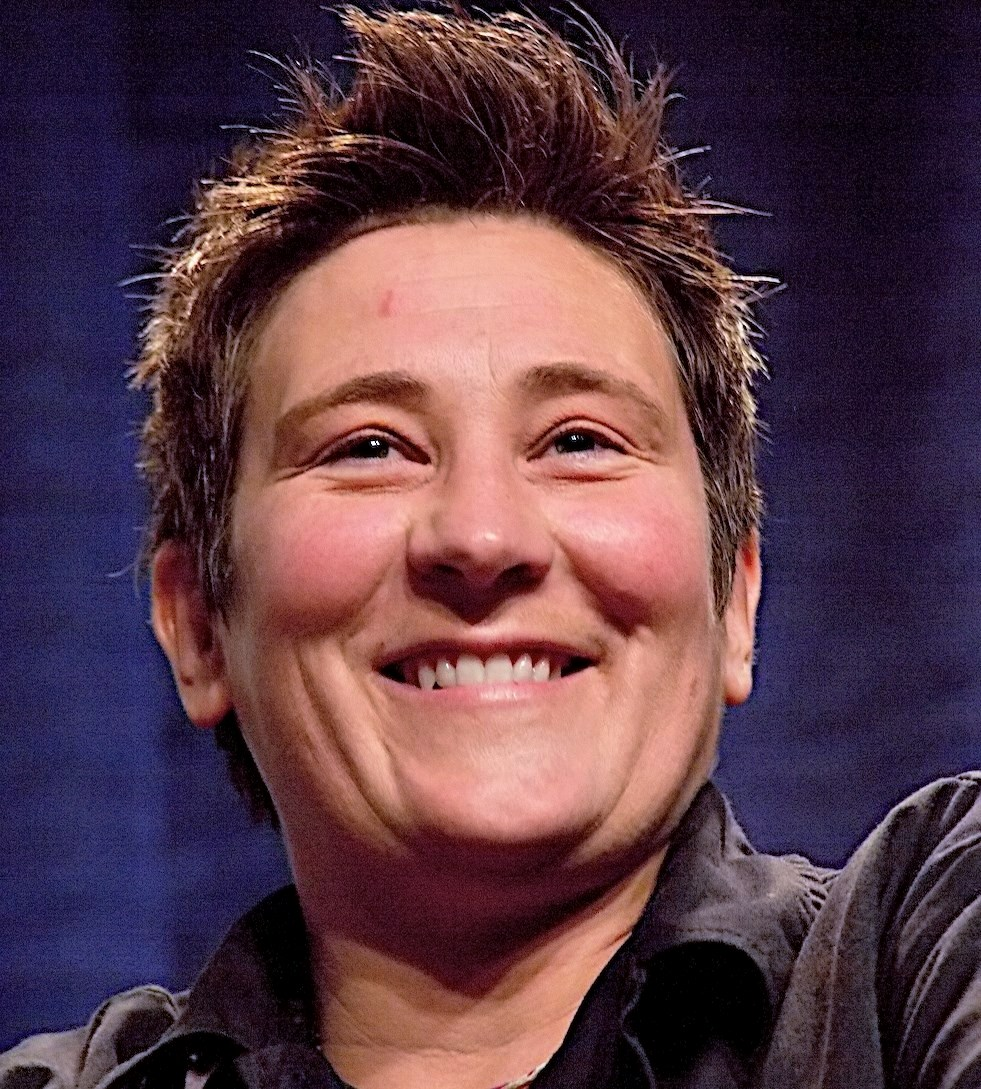
- lang in 2006

Background information
- Also known as: Kathy Lang
- Born: Kathryn Dawn Lang; November 2, 1961 (age 65); Edmonton, Alberta, Canada
- Genres: Country; pop; folk
- Occupations: Singer-songwriter; record producer; actress
- Instruments: Vocals; guitar
- Years active: 1981–present
- Labels: Bumstead; Sire; Warner Bros.; Nonesuch; Elektra
- Website: kdlang.com

Signature
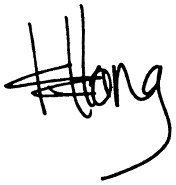

Kathryn Dawn Lang OC AOE (born November 2, 1961), known by her stage name k.d. lang (stylized in all lowercase), is a Canadian pop and country singer-songwriter and occasional actress. Lang has won Juno Awards and Grammy Awards for her musical performances. Her hits include the songs "Constant Craving" and "Miss Chatelaine".

A mezzo-soprano, lang has contributed songs to movie soundtracks and has collaborated with musicians such as Roy Orbison, Tony Bennett, Elton John, the Killers, Anne Murray, Ann Wilson, Karen Carpenter, and Jane Siberry. She performed at the closing ceremony of the 1988 Winter Olympics in Calgary, Alberta, and at the opening ceremony of the 2010 Winter Olympics in Vancouver, British Columbia, where she performed Leonard Cohen's "Hallelujah".

Lang has also been active as an animal rights, LGBTQ rights, and Tibetan human rights activist. She is a tantric practitioner of the old school of Tibetan Buddhism.

== Early life ==
Lang was born in Edmonton, Alberta, the youngest child of Audrey Bebee and Adam Frederick Lang. She is of English, Irish, Scottish, German, Russian-Jewish, Icelandic, and Sioux ancestry, but has been quoted as describing herself as "a real Canadian". When lang was nine months old, her family moved to Consort, Alberta, where she grew up with two older sisters and one older brother in the Canadian prairies. Her father, a drugstore owner, left the family when she was twelve.

After secondary school, lang attended Red Deer College, where she became fascinated with the life and music of Patsy Cline and decided to pursue a career as a professional singer. She moved to Edmonton, Alberta, after her graduation in 1982.

== Career ==
=== k.d. lang and the Reclines (1983–1989) ===
Lang answered Jim Alexander's classified ad in the Edmonton Journal looking for a singer for his country-swing band. After a show at Devil's Lake Corral which drew over 500 people, lang joined with label owner and manager Larry Wanagas to form a Patsy Cline tribute band, the Reclines, in 1983. They recorded their debut single, "Friday Dance Promenade", at Sundown Recorders. The first band featured Stu Macdougal on keys, Dave Bjarnason on drums, Gary Koligar on guitar and bassist Farley Scott.

The Reclines regularly played Edmonton's popular Sidetrack Cafe, a local venue that featured live bands six nights a week. In 1983, lang presented a performance-art piece, a seven-hour re-enactment of the transplantation of an artificial heart for Barney Clark, a retired American dentist. A Truly Western Experience was released in 1984 and received strong reviews and led to national attention in Canada. In August 1984, lang was one of three Canadian artists to be selected to perform at the World Science Fair in Tsukuba, Japan (along with other performing and recording contracts throughout Japan).

Singing at country and western venues in Canada, lang began to establish an appearance and style referred to as "cowboy punk". She was called a "Canadian Cowpunk" in the June 20, 1985, issue of Rolling Stone. She would later recall the inspiration for her defining look in an interview with the Canadian Press: "I used to sew plastic cowboys and Indians on my clothes – just having fun with it on a budget. I was broke at the time, so I'd find things at Value Village or get my mom to make me a skirt from the curtains she was about to throw out. I loved playing with the clothes as much as the music."

Lang made several recordings that received very positive reviews and earned a 1985 Juno Award for Most Promising Female Vocalist. She accepted the award wearing a wedding dress borrowed from her male roommate. She also made numerous tongue-in-cheek promises about what she would and would not do in the future, thus fulfilling the title of 'Most Promising'. She has won a total of eight Juno Awards.

In 1986, lang signed a contract with an American record producer in Nashville, Tennessee, and received critical acclaim for her 1987 album, Angel with a Lariat, which was produced by Dave Edmunds.

In 1989, lang released her last album with the Reclines, Absolute Torch And Twang, which won the Grammy for Best Female Country Vocal Performance.

=== Solo career ===
Lang chose to use a lower-case name, inspired by the poet e. e. cummings.

Lang's career received a huge boost when Roy Orbison chose her to record a duet of his standard, "Crying", a collaboration that won them the Grammy Award for Best Country Vocal Collaboration in 1989. The song was used in the Jon Cryer film Hiding Out released in 1987. Due to the success of the song, lang received the Entertainer of the Year award from the Canadian Country Music Association. Lang would win the same award for the next three years, in addition to two Female Vocalist of the Year awards in 1988 and 1989.

1988 marked the release of Shadowland, an album of torch country produced by Owen Bradley. In late 1988, Shadowland was named Album of the Year by the Canadian Country Music Association. That year she also performed "Turn Me Round" at the closing ceremonies of the XV Winter Olympics in Calgary, and sang background vocals with Jennifer Warnes and Bonnie Raitt for Orbison's acclaimed television special, Roy Orbison and Friends, A Black and White Night.

Lang first earned international recognition in 1988 when she performed as "The Alberta Rose" at the closing ceremonies of the Winter Olympics. Canadian women's magazine Chatelaine selected lang as its "Woman of the Year" in 1988.

In 1990, lang contributed the song "So in Love" to the Cole Porter tribute album Red Hot + Blue produced by the Red Hot Organization. In 1998, she contributed "Fado Hilário" to the AIDS benefit compilation album Onda Sonora: Red Hot + Lisbon produced by the same organization.

In 1991, lang and Jane Siberry collaborated on the song "Calling All Angels", which originally appeared on the soundtrack for the film Until the End of the World. The song was also included on Siberry's 1993 album When I Was a Boy.

=== Grammy Awards and mainstream success ===
Lang won the Grammy Award for Best Female Country Vocal Performance for her 1989 album Absolute Torch and Twang. The single "Full Moon Full of Love" that stemmed from that album became a modest hit in the United States in the middle of 1989 and a Number 1 hit on the RPM Country chart in Canada. In 1989, she sang a duet, "Sin City", with Dwight Yoakam on his album Just Lookin' for a Hit.

The 1992 album Ingénue, a set of adult-oriented pop songs that showed comparatively little country influence, contained her most popular song, "Constant Craving". That song brought her multi-million sales and much critical acclaim. Coming out as lesbian the same year saw several US country stations banning her music, and she faced a picket line outside the 1993 Grammy Awards ceremony where she would receive the Grammy Award for Best Female Pop Vocal Performance. Another top ten single from the record was "Miss Chatelaine". The salsa-inspired track was ironic; Chatelaine, a women's magazine, once chose lang as its "Woman of the Year", and the song's video depicted lang in an exaggeratedly feminine manner, surrounded by bright pastel colours and a profusion of bubbles reminiscent of a performance on The Lawrence Welk Show.

She received a writing credit for the Rolling Stones 1997 song, "Anybody Seen My Baby?", whose chorus sounds similar to "Constant Craving". Jagger and Richards claimed to have never heard the song before and when they discovered the similarity prior to the song's release, were flummoxed as to how the songs could be so similar. Jagger discovered his daughter listening to a recording of "Constant Craving" on her stereo and realized he had heard the song before many times but only subliminally. The two gave lang credit, along with her co-writer Ben Mink, to avoid any possible lawsuits. Afterwards, lang said she was "completely honoured and flattered" to receive the songwriting credit.

She contributed much of the music towards Gus Van Sant's soundtrack of the film Even Cowgirls Get the Blues, and also did a cover of "Skylark" for the 1997 film adaptation of Midnight in the Garden of Good and Evil. She performed "Surrender" for the closing titles of the James Bond film Tomorrow Never Dies.

In 1997, Drag, an album of cover tunes dedicated to "smoke" (specifically cigarette smoking), was released. The album cover and booklet photographs show lang in a man's suit, referring to cross-dressing as another possible meaning of the word "drag". The songs on Drag include "Smoke Dreams", from the '40s, Steve Miller Band's "The Joker", "Smoke Rings", the theme from the cult film Valley of the Dolls, and eight other smoke-themed songs.

In 1999, lang ranked No. 33 on VH-1's 100 Greatest Women in Rock & Roll, and she ranked No. 26 on CMT's 40 Greatest Women in Country Music in 2002, one of eight women to make both lists.

Throughout all her success, lang continued to perform barefoot.

=== 2000s ===
In 2003, she won her fourth Grammy Award, for Best Traditional Pop Vocal Album for her collaboration with Tony Bennett on A Wonderful World.

In 2004, Stephen Holden of The New York Times wrote: "Few singers command such perfection of pitch. Her voice, at once beautiful and unadorned and softened with a veil of smoke, invariably hits the middle of a note and remains there. She discreetly flaunted her technique, drawing out notes and shading them from sustained cries into softer, vibrato-laden murmurs. She balanced her commitment to the material with humor, projecting a twinkling merriment behind it all."

In the same year, lang released Hymns of the 49th Parallel, which featured cover versions of songs by iconic English-speaking Canadian singer-songwriters: Bruce Cockburn, Leonard Cohen, Joni Mitchell, Ron Sexsmith, Jane Siberry, and Neil Young. According to the Canadian Record Industry Association (CRIA), in April 2006, the album went platinum in Canada selling over 100,000 copies. In December 2007, the album reached double platinum status in Australia selling over 140,000 copies.

Also in 2004, she sang the song "Little Patch of Heaven" for the Disney film Home on the Range.

On July 29, 2006, lang performed her hit "Constant Craving" at the opening ceremonies of the Outgames held in Montreal, Quebec, Canada.

In 2006, she paired with singer Madeleine Peyroux on a cover of the Joni Mitchell song "River", for Peyroux's album, Half the Perfect World. That same year lang was featured in Nellie McKay's second album, Pretty Little Head, singing with McKay in "We Had it Right". As well, lang sang a version of The Beatles' "Golden Slumbers" for the Happy Feet film soundtrack. She also sang a duet with Ann Wilson on the Heart singer's solo album Hope & Glory covering the Lucinda Williams song "Jackson".

In 2007, she teamed up with one of her childhood idols, Anne Murray, on a remake of Anne's hit, "A Love Song", that was featured on Anne's album Anne Murray Duets: Friends & Legends.

On February 5, 2008, she released an album of new material titled Watershed. It was her first collection of original material since the release of her 2000 album Invincible Summer.

=== 2010s ===
Lang's first complete greatest-hits collection was released on February 2, 2010, on the Nonesuch label as Recollection.

In 2010, she was in Nashville, working on a new album, titled Sing it Loud. The Nonesuch album was released by lang and the Siss Boom Bang in a spring 2011 release. The band toured North America in summer 2011.

In 2012, she moved from Los Angeles to Portland, Oregon.

In 2016, lang collaborated with Neko Case and Laura Veirs on the album project case/lang/veirs.

She participated in the Leonard Cohen memorial celebration "Tower Of Song" in Quebec in November 2017, performing "Hallelujah".

She is featured in the song "Lightning Fields" by The Killers from their 2020 album Imploding the Mirage. In the song, her verse begins with the line: "Don't beat yourself up, you laid good ground" and continues for several more lines.

Makeover, a collection of classic dance remixes made from 1992 to 2000, was released on May 28, 2021. 2021 also saw a number of lang's earlier recordings reissued on vinyl.

=== Semi-retirement ===
In 2019, lang said in an interview that she considers herself semi-retired and may not be writing and recording new songs in the future. "I'm not feeling any particular urge to make music right now. The muse is eluding me. I am completely at peace with the fact that I may be done."

== Film and television appearances ==
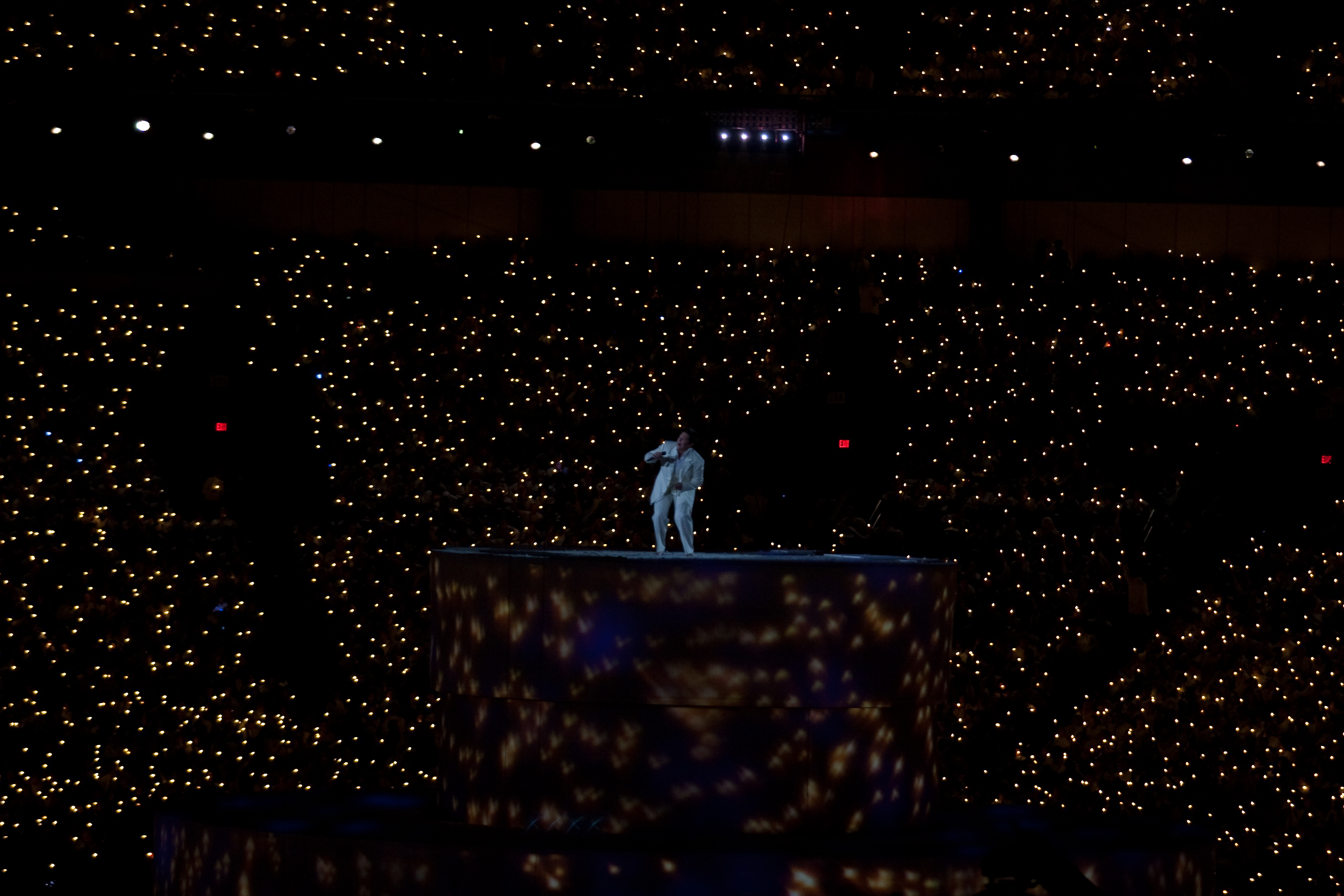
Lang performing Leonard Cohen's "Hallelujah" at the 2010 Winter Olympics opening ceremony

Lang performed several times on The Super Dave Osborne Show starting in 1987.

In 1988, k.d. lang and The Reclines appeared on Austin City Limits.

Lang played the lead in the 1991 drama film Salmonberries, and also co-starred with Ewan McGregor and Ashley Judd in Eye of the Beholder (1999). She appeared as Dita Tommey in the 1997 miniseries, The Last Don. She had an uncredited role as a lounge singer, performing the song "Love for Sale", in 2006's The Black Dahlia. She has also made guest appearances on the sitcoms The Larry Sanders Show, Dharma & Greg, and the famous coming out episode of Ellen. She appeared on the Christmas special of Pee Wee's Playhouse, where she performed the song "Jingle Bell Rock". She also made a guest appearance on the "Garbage" episode of The Jim Henson Hour, and in 2008 appeared on Rove McManus' live hour show Rove.

Lang performed with the BBC Concert Orchestra for an intimate crowd at 18th-century church LSO St Luke's in London on February 3, 2008. First aired as part of the BBC Four Sessions, the concert was released as a DVD titled Live in London in 2009.

On February 12, 2010, she performed Leonard Cohen's "Hallelujah" at the Olympics Opening Ceremony in Vancouver, British Columbia. In early May 2010, lang filled in at the last minute for Susan Boyle at the Australian TV Logie Awards to reprise her Winter Olympics performance of Leonard Cohen's "Hallelujah", receiving an extended standing ovation. In 2010, she sang "You're a Mean One, Mr. Grinch" with Matthew Morrison in a Christmas episode of Glee, and is featured on Glee: The Music, The Christmas Album. In February 2013, she appeared in Season 8 of the CBS sitcom, How I Met Your Mother, as herself.

In 2014, she appeared in the Season 4 finale of Portlandia as an exaggerated version of herself.

Lang made her Broadway debut as the "Special Guest Star" in Broadway's After Midnight, replacing Fantasia Barrino and to be succeeded by Toni Braxton and Babyface. She appeared from February 11 to March 9, 2014.

On February 16, 2020, she performed at Fire Fight Australia at ANZ Stadium in Sydney, Australia. This was a concert organised to raise money for those affected by the 2019 bushfires in Australia. One of her performances included a rendition of Leonard Cohen's classic song, "Hallelujah".

In September 2024, lang reunited with her old band The Reclines to perform together for the first time in 35 years at the 2024 Canadian Country Music Awards in Edmonton, Alberta.

== Activism ==
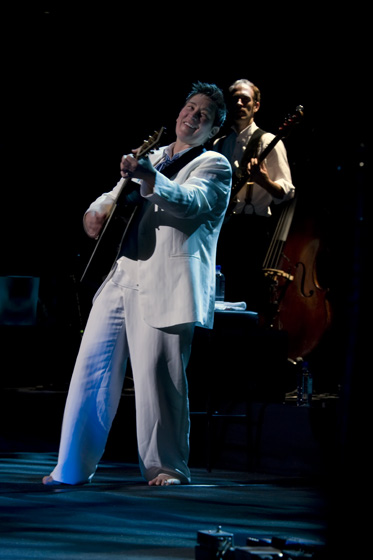
Lang performing at Hamer Hall in Melbourne, Australia, in 2008

Lang, who came out as a lesbian in a June 1992 article of the LGBTQ news magazine The Advocate, has championed gay rights causes.

She has supported many causes over the years, including HIV/AIDS care and research. Her cover of Cole Porter's "So in Love" (from the Broadway musical, Kiss Me, Kate), appears on the Red Hot + Blue compilation album and video from 1990 (a tribute to Cole Porter to benefit AIDS research and relief). Her 2010 greatest hits album, Recollection, also includes this cover of "So in Love". Lang also recorded the song "Fado Hilário", singing in Portuguese, for the 1999 Red Hot AIDS benefit album Onda Sonora: Red Hot + Lisbon, a traditional fado from Portugal.

She is a vegetarian. Her "Meat Stinks" campaign in the 1990s created much controversy, particularly in her hometown, in the middle of Alberta's cattle ranching industry—she was banned from more than 30 Alberta radio stations. A sign in Consort, Alberta, stating "Home of k.d. lang" was burned to the ground. Alberta's agriculture minister at the time said it was "extremely unfortunate that she has decided to side with the animal rightists. There's a certain feeling of betrayal – we have supported k.d. fairly well in Alberta". More than a dozen radio stations in the U.S. throughout Kansas, Oklahoma, Missouri, Montana, and Nebraska also boycotted playing her records due to her "Meat Stinks" campaign.

Lang appeared on the cover of the August 1993 issue of Vanity Fair photographed by Herb Ritts. The cover featured lang in a barber chair while model Cindy Crawford appeared to shave her face with a straight razor, which lang would later say was inspired by the French film Le mari de la coiffeuse. The issue contained a detailed article about lang which observed that she had thought that she would be ostracized by the country music industry when she came out as a lesbian. "I presented myself as myself. I didn't try to dispel lesbian rumors. I sang songs like 'Bopalina,' which was about my girlfriend. I didn't take boyfriends to the Grammys. I didn't do anything to cover it up; I just lived my life. There was a part of me that really didn't think it was important to make an announcement. But to the gay community, saying 'I'm a lesbian' is dispelling any doubt." However, they were accepting, and her records continued to sell, but when she appeared in an ad for PETA, they were less impressed, owing to the relationship between country music and cattle ranching.

In April 2008, lang spent time in Melbourne, Australia, as a guest editor for The Age. This was in connection with her support for the Tibet human rights issues. On April 24, 2008, she joined pro-Tibet protesters in Canberra as the Beijing 2008 Summer Olympics torch relay made its way through the Australian capital.

In 2011, lang was inducted to Q Hall of Fame Canada in recognition of the work she has done to further equality for all peoples around the world.

Lang reflected on coming out in a 2016 interview with The Canadian Press, saying it "felt like it was the most responsible thing for society and myself" at the time. She also noted that dealing with the fallout was something she struggled with in the years that followed. "It's a very hard thing to unravel for me and decipher", she said. "In a way you can't. It's all just a big ball of wax of who I am and what my role in popular culture was – and what pop culture's role was in me."

Lang is a member of Canadian charity Artists Against Racism.

== Achievements ==
In 1996, she was made an Officer of the Order of Canada.

In 1998, she was inducted into The ArQuives: Canada's LGBTQ2+ Archives' National Portrait Collection.

In November 2005, lang received the National Arts Centre Award, a companion award of the Governor General's Performing Arts Awards. On June 3, 2008, it was announced that she would receive a star on Canada's Walk of Fame. In 2018 lang was appointed to the Alberta Order of Excellence.

On April 21, 2013, during the 2013 Juno Awards, lang was formally inducted into the Canadian Music Hall of Fame. She is notable for praising Canadians and "letting your freak flags fly" during her acceptance speech. Also in 2013, the Alberta Ballet Company staged Balletlujah! set to the songs of lang's music and inspired by lang. The ballet was later made into a film broadcast on CBC.

In June 2024, lang was announced to be the 2024 Canadian Country Music Hall of Fame Artist inductee.

== Personal life ==
In 1996, lang became romantically involved with actress Leisha Hailey. The couple were together until 2001. Most of the songs on Invincible Sun were inspired by her falling in love with Hailey. A 2008 article in which lang is interviewed states that "when she isn't working, Lang is mostly a homebody, living quietly with a girlfriend she refers to as 'my wife' – they're not legally married – and her two dogs." On November 11, 2009, she entered into a domestic partnership with Jamie Price, whom she had met in 2003. After separating on September 6, 2011, lang filed for a dissolution of the partnership in Los Angeles County Superior Court in Los Angeles, California, on December 30, 2011.

== Musical style and influences ==
Early in life, lang was listening to and was influenced by female artists, such as Joni Mitchell, Rickie Lee Jones, Kate Bush, Emmylou Harris, and Linda Ronstadt. Her early career was strongly influenced by country music in the 1980s, but she later viewed it as a brief obsession, expressing admiration for the "direct human emotion" and storytelling found in singers Patsy Cline and Loretta Lynn but growing uncomfortable with political implications often found in the genre.

Lang's voice is described as a mezzo soprano. Her voice lies between the soprano and the contralto voice types.

== Filmography ==
Film
Year	Title	Role
1991	Salmonberries	Kotzebue
1994	Teresa's Tattoo	Michelle
1999	Eye of the Beholder	Hilary
2006	The Black Dahlia	Lesbian Bar Singer (uncredited)

Television
Year	Title	Role
1987	Hee Haw	Herself
1988	Pee-wee's Playhouse Christmas Special	Herself
1989	The Jim Henson Hour	Herself
1995	The Larry Sanders Show	Herself
1997	Ellen	Janine
1997	The Last Don	Dita Tommey
2000	Dharma & Greg	Herself
2013	How I Met Your Mother	Herself
2014	Portlandia	Herself
2020	Jann	Herself

== Theatre ==
Year	Title	Role
2014	After Midnight	Special Guest Star

== Awards ==
=== A2IM Libera Awards ===
Year	Nominee / work	Award	Result	Ref.
2017	case/lang/veirs	Best Country/Americana/Folk Album	Nominated	

=== ASCAP Pop Music Awards ===
Year	Nominee / work	Award	Result	Ref.
1994	"Constant Craving"	Most Performed Song	Won	

=== Academy of Country Music Awards ===
Year	Nominee / work	Award	Result
1987	Herself	Top New Female Vocalist	Nominated
1989	Herself	Top Female Vocalist	Nominated

=== Alibu Music Awards ===
Year	Nominee / work	Award	Result	Ref.
2016	case/lang/veirs	International Folk Album of the Year	Won	

=== American Music Awards ===
Year	Nominee / work	Award	Result	Ref.
1993	Herself	Favorite Adult Contemporary New Artist	Won	

=== Americana Music Honors & Awards ===
Year	Nominee / work	Award	Result
2018	Herself	Trailblazer Award	Won

=== Billboard Music Awards ===
Year	Nominee / work	Award	Result
1992	"Constant Craving"	Best Pop/Rock Female Video	Nominated

=== Brit Awards ===
Year	Nominee / work	Award	Result
1995	Herself	International Female Solo Artist	Won
1996	Herself	International Female Solo Artist	Nominated

=== GLAAD Media Awards ===
Year	Nominee / work	Award	Result
2001	Invincible Summer	Outstanding Music Album	Won
2003	A Wonderful World	Outstanding Music Album	Won
2009	Watershed	Outstanding Music Artist	Won

=== Grammy Awards ===
Year	Nominee / work	Award	Result
1989	"Crying" (shared with Roy Orbison)	Best Country Vocal Collaboration	Won
1990	"Absolute Torch and Twang"	Best Female Country Vocal Performance	Won
1993	Ingénue	Album of the Year	Nominated
1993	"Constant Craving"	Song of the Year	Nominated
1993	"Constant Craving"	Record of the Year	Nominated
1993	"Constant Craving"	Best Female Pop Vocal Performance	Won
1994	"Miss Chatelaine"	Best Female Pop Vocal Performance	Nominated
1995	"Moonglow" (with Tony Bennett)	Best Pop Collaboration with Vocals	Nominated
2003	"What A Wonderful World" (with Tony Bennett)	Best Pop Collaboration with Vocals	Nominated
2004	"La Vie En Rose" (with Tony Bennett)	Best Pop Collaboration with Vocals	Nominated
2004	A Wonderful World (shared with Tony Bennett)	Best Traditional Pop Vocal Album	Won

=== Helpmann Awards ===
Year	Nominee / work	Award	Result
2004	The Wonderful World Tour (with Tony Bennett)	Best Contemporary Concert Presentation Theatre	Nominated
2005	Concert with the Sydney Symphony	Best International Contemporary Music Concert	Nominated

=== Juno Awards ===
Year	Nominee / work	Award	Result
1985	Herself	Most Promising Female Vocalist of the Year	Won
1987	Herself	Country Female Vocalist of the Year	Nominated
1987	Herself	Female Vocalist of the Year	Nominated
1989	Herself	Female Vocalist of the Year	Nominated
1989	Herself	Canadian Entertainer of the Year	Nominated
1989	Herself	Country Female Vocalist of the Year	Won
1990	Herself	Country Female Vocalist of the Year	Won
1990	Herself	Canadian Entertainer of the Year	Nominated
1993	Herself	Best Female Vocalist	Nominated
1993	Herself	Songwriter of the Year	Won
1993	Herself	Best Producer	Won
1993	Ingénue	Best Album	Won
1994	Herself	Best Producer	Nominated
1994	Herself	Best Recording Engineer	Nominated
1995	Herself	Best Recording Engineer	Nominated
2005	Herself	Artist of the Year	Nominated

=== Polaris Music Prize ===
Year	Nominee / work	Award	Result	Ref
2017	Ingénue	Heritage Award	Nominated	
2018	Ingénue	Heritage Award	Nominated	
2019	Ingénue	Heritage Award	Nominated	

=== Pollstar Concert Industry Awards ===
Year	Nominee / work	Award	Result
1990	Tour	Club Tour of the Year	Nominated
1990	Tour	Best Debut Tour	Nominated
1993	Tour	Small Hall Tour of the Year	Nominated
2002	Tour (w/Tony Bennett)	Major Tour of the Year	Won

=== Rober Awards Music Prize ===
Year	Nominee / work	Award	Result	Ref.
2016	case/lang/veirs	Best Songwriter	Nominated	

== Discography ==
=== Studio albums ===
- Shadowland (1988)
- Ingénue (1992)
- All You Can Eat (1995)
- Drag (1997)
- Invincible Summer (2000)
- Hymns of the 49th Parallel (2004)
- Watershed (2008)

=== with The Reclines ===
- A Truly Western Experience with The Reclines (1984)
- Angel with a Lariat with The Reclines (1987)
- Absolute Torch and Twang with The Reclines (1989)

=== Collaboration albums ===
- A Wonderful World with Tony Bennett (2002)
- Sing It Loud with The Siss Boom Bang (2011)
- case/lang/veirs with case/lang/veirs (2016)

=== Soundtrack albums ===
- Even Cowgirls Get the Blues (1993)
- Friends (1994) – "Sexuality"
- Twister (1996) - "Love Affair"
- Tomorrow Never Dies (1997) – "Surrender"
- Home on the Range (2004) – "Little Patch of Heaven"
- Happy Feet (2006) – "Golden Slumbers / The End"

== See also ==
- Academy of Country Music
- Country Music Association
- LGBTQ representation in country music
- List of artists who reached number one on the US Dance chart
- List of country musicians
- List of barefooters
- List of number-one dance hits (United States)
