= Satyricon (nightclub) =

Former nightclub in Portland, Oregon, U.S.

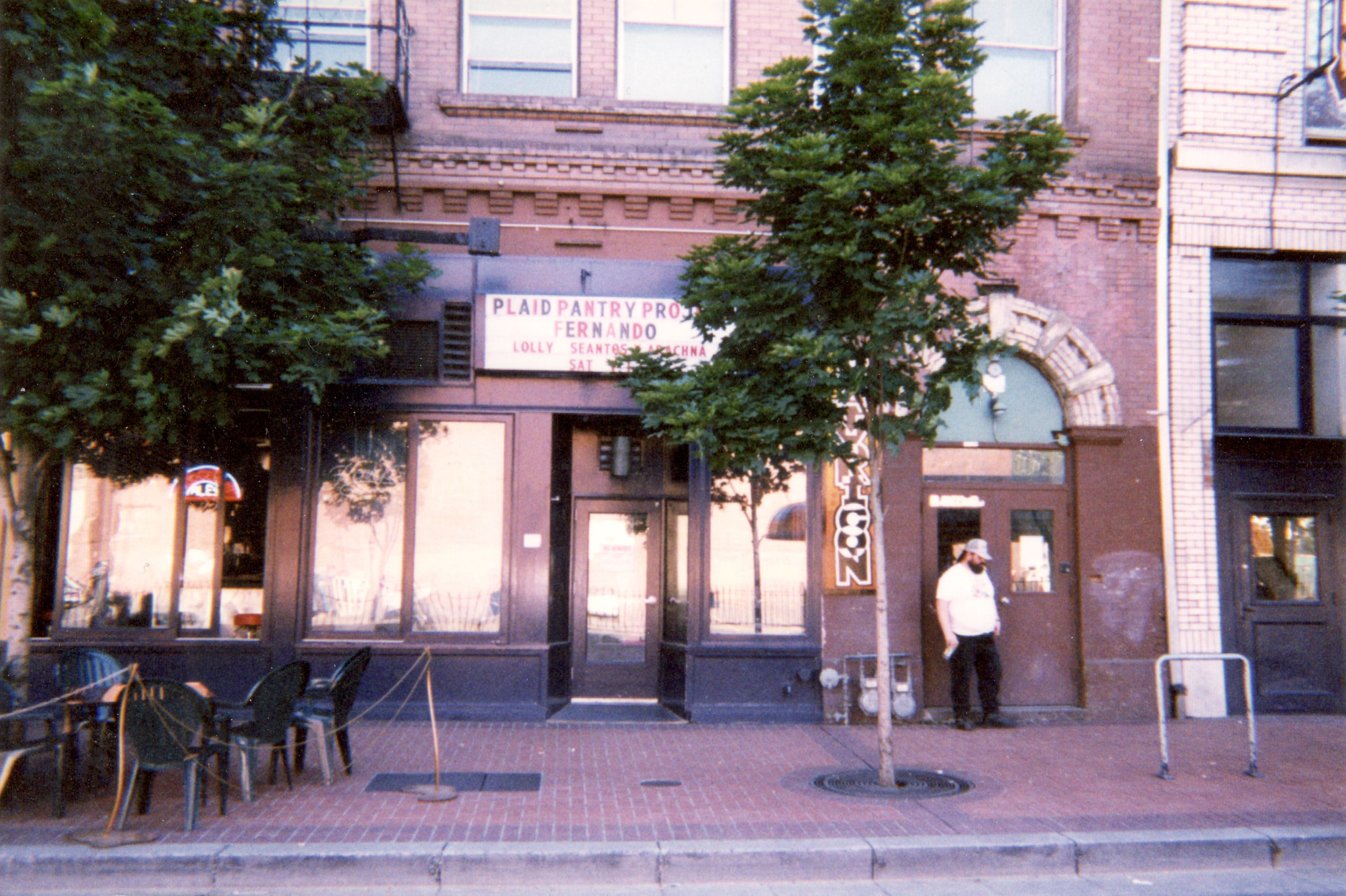
- Satyricon in 1997

- Location within Portland, Oregon
- Former names: Marlena's Tavern
- Address: 125 N.W. Sixth Avenue; Portland, Oregon, U.S.
- Coordinates: 45.5242°N 122.6768°W
- Capacity: 400

Construction
- Opened: March 1984
- Closed: November 1, 2010
- Demolished: July 2011
- Years active: 1983–2003; 2006–2010

Satyricon was a nightclub in the Old Town neighborhood of Portland, Oregon, United States that operated from 1984 to 2010. It was the longest-running punk venue in the western United States, and has been referred to by some journalists and historians as the "CBGB of the West Coast." It is also the place where musicians Kurt Cobain and Courtney Love are said to have first met.

Located in a building that had served as a horse stable in the early 1900s, the club's owner, George Touhouliotis, founded Satyricon after acquiring a tavern that had operated in the building. Touhouliotis reshaped the tavern into a nightclub, and named it after the 1969 Federico Fellini film of the same name. Satyricon became a prominent music venue in the city, and hosted various local and touring punk and alternative rock bands throughout the 1980s and 1990s.

In May 2003, Satyricon abruptly closed; the club was acquired by new owners and reopened as an all-ages venue in 2006. After the building it was located in was sold, Satyricon closed permanently in November 2010 and the building razed in July 2011. The club was the subject of a 2013 documentary titled Satyricon: Madness and Glory.

== History ==
=== Background ===
The Satyricon, located at 125 N.W. Sixth Avenue, was formerly Marlena's Tavern, "a dark, narrow barroom on a seedy stretch." Prior to its establishment as a bar and restaurant, the building had served as a horse stable in the early 20th century before being converted into a tavern.

Satyricon was founded by George Touhouliotis, a former taxi driver who acquired Marlena's Tavern in 1983. Upon taking ownership, Touhouliotis re-conceived the location as a nightclub that would offer live music. He named the club Satyricon after the 1969 Federico Fellini film of the same name. At the time, the surrounding Old Town Chinatown neighborhood had a seedy and dangerous reputation. The block was characterized as Portland's skid row, "a real shithole of a neighborhood" with "open drug dealing, fights, knives, [and] guns." Local historian SP Clarke opined that "A mere attempt to walk the sidewalks ... required a helmet and full body armor."

=== Early years and heyday ===
==== 1980s ====
In 1984, there was no Pearl District, no River District, no Chinese Garden, no MAX. Instead of a sedate old folks' home, Satyricon's neighbors included a shady grocery store (later bombed) and a corner dive bar longtime Portlanders still remember with a shiver. Instead of Fellini, dolled-up rockers and living ghosts from Old Town's street scene jostled around a gyros counter oh-so-accurately named Eat or Die.

— Journalist Zach Dundas on the club's location in the 1980s

Satyricon opened in March 1984, (Note: Per a Willamette Week article dated March 12, 1984, Satyricon had been in its second week of business, indicating the official opening date would have been some time in early March 1984.) and attracted a wide array of musical groups, as the club's booking agent made "no stylistic or hierarchical" distinction among the musical acts. Local punk bands the Wipers and Poison Idea became notable regular acts at the club, as well as various underground musicians. According to public documents regarding the business's liquor control license, Satyricon opened at 8 p.m. each night, and offered "live music and dancing" from 10 p.m. until around 2:30 a.m. Additionally, the club hosted open mic nights, poetry readings, and performance art exhibitions.

On September 20, 1985, Satyricon began offering food, which included a souvlaki take-out window called Eat or Die. By 1985, the club was selling around $7,000 of alcoholic beverages per month, and around $3,000 in food, with 20% of all food orders occurring through the take-out window. Owner Touhoulitis petitioned for the Oregon Liquor Control Commission (OLCC) to allow for relaxations on allowing minors into the club's bandstand area between March 1984 and July 1985, but multiple incidents in which minors infiltrated the bar led the OLCC to determine that "the premises [are] not suitable for increased access by minors." This largely had to do with the club's layout, which maintained little division between the bandstand and the bar. The interior of the building was described by journalists as such:

As you step up to the long, obsidian-black bar, you may notice the Buddha that presides from behind the bar, the sensual art above, and stars on the ceiling. Explore a bit more and you'll find graffiti on the tables, an open-staged DJ booth, black & white checkered floors, and the infamous Round-table, in a corner, with a pentagram etched into it. Now, it's time that we enter the inner sanctum, the stage area. Plastered with hundreds of band stickers, that would take someone days to take in. Like a museum of modern art, you see the history dating back to its unveiling in 1983. The stage itself is comfortable, like an old basement rehearsal space with a high ceiling.

Courtney Love (right) and other patrons attending an event at Satyricon c. 1989

In the mid-1980s, the club was frequented by local residents such as poet Walt Curtis and Courtney Love, the latter of whom met friend and bandmate Kat Bjelland there in 1984 through The Miracle Workers' frontman Gerry Mohr. The club is also notable for being the place where Love first crossed paths with her future husband, Nirvana frontman Kurt Cobain. In a 2010 interview, she claimed she met Cobain there in 1988 at a Dharma Bums concert where she was reading spoken word poetry, although other accounts state that the two met in January 1989 or 1990 when Nirvana was playing at the club, and that they playfully wrestled in front of a jukebox that night. Mark Arm of Mudhoney would later claim the story to be apocryphal, and that two in fact met while Mudhoney was touring with Love's band Hole in Europe in 1991. In a 2015 interview, Love clarified: "It was at the Satyricon ... I sometimes lie and say which bands were playing but I actually don't remember. But Nirvana was obviously playing. He was cute, he was attractive, and he was funny ... Everyone always writes that the song that was playing [on the jukebox] was Living Colour, but that wasn't it. It was "Dear Friend" by Flying Color.

Commenting on the various stories and lore surrounding the club, journalist Zach Dundas wrote: "The written record of the club's existence–which can amount to no more than 1 percent of the Whole Truth–is a florid tale of excess, controversy, creative chaos. And, yes, artistic greatness."

==== 1990s ====
In 1990, a benefit LP record was put out for the club called "Satyricon ... the Album". It included tracks from local punk acts such as Poison Idea, Dharma Bums and Napalm Beach. Beginning in the early 1990s, Satyricon became a frequent host to grunge bands, including Nirvana, Soundgarden, Pearl Jam, and Mudhoney, among others. In 1993, Satyricon opened its own restaurant called Fellini, a nod to the club's namesake.

Dave Grohl played his first show with his post-Nirvana outfit Foo Fighters (after Cobain's death) at Satyricon. Other events, besides notable concerts, include a number of incidents involving notable people (including Courtney Love passing out) and a police riot in 1990.

=== Renovation and closure ===
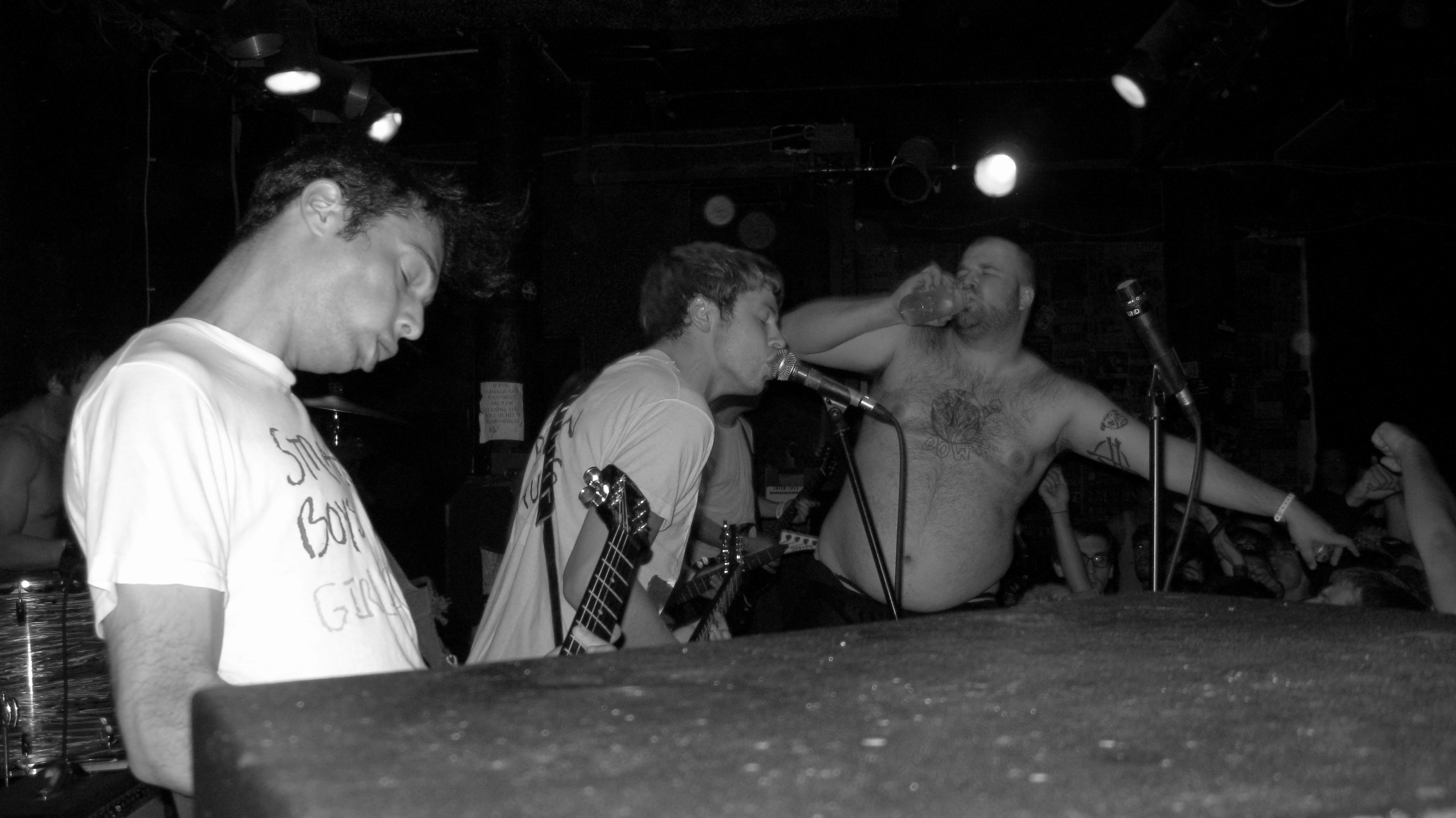
Fucked Up performing at Satyricon, 2008

In May 2003, Satyricon abruptly closed and was slated to be taken over by the owners of another (former) club in town, Moody's. It reopened as an all-ages club in August 2006 under the management of the owners of the Loveland, an all-ages venue in Portland. Mild renovations were undertaken, though a review of the club upon its reopening noted: "The club looks the same ... eerily so. Same bar stools, same black paint. At the same time, it looks unfinished, like someone decided to remodel, ripped up a few boards and then totally slacked off."

In October 2010, Ben Munat, the Satyricon's booking agent, organized thirteen "Farewell Satyricon Shows" for that month. Bands included Big Daddy Meat Straw, the Dandy Warhols (with original drummer Eric Hedford, playing songs from first two albums with some original guitars), Pond, Poison Idea, and Napalm Beach, with the final concert taking place on October 31, 2010. Commenting on the club's closure, owner Touhouliotis said: "I had gotten tired. A place like that runs on creativity and energy; it's not automatic. And by the late '90s, the turn of the millennium, my energy wasn't there."

=== Demolition and aftermath ===
Demolition of the building began in July 2011, after which many pieces of furniture, memorabilia, and parts of the building were "unceremoniously given away to anyone interested." The urinal trough in the men's restroom was reportedly acquired by a tulip farm in Gresham. The marquee above the club's entrance was believed to have been either stolen or destroyed in the demolition process, as it remained unaccounted for. In 2017, Courtney Taylor-Taylor, frontman of the Dandy Warhols, reported that he had found the marquee, which he had installed at The Old Portland, a wine bar he opened in 2016. The location of the original building is now home to the nonprofit Maybelle Center for Community and Macdonald West affordable apartments.

== In popular culture ==
The club was used as a filming location for Gus Van Sant's 1985 film, Mala Noche. In 2013, after its demolition, a documentary about the club, Satyricon: Madness and Glory, was released.

== See also ==
- Culture of Portland, Oregon
- Music of Oregon

== Works cited ==
- Evans, Liz (1994). Women, Sex and Rock'n'roll: In Their Own Words. Pandora. ISBN 978-0-044-40900-7. OCLC 494693178.
- Green, Joey (2003). How They Met: Fateful Encounters of Famous Lovebirds, Rivals, Partners in Crime. Black Dog Publishing. ISBN 978-1-4223-6673-8. OCLC 52621239.
- Oregon Liquor Control Commission (OLCC) (1986). "Final Order: Satyricon" (PDF). Oregon Liquor Control Commission. State of Oregon.
- Schultz, William Todd (2015). Torment Saint: The Life of Elliott Smith. Bloomsbury USA. ISBN 978-1-620-40784-4.
- Trombold, John; Donahue, Peter (2017). Reading Portland: The City in Prose. University of Washington Press. ISBN 978-0-295-99760-5.
- Yarm, Mark (2011). Everybody Loves Our Town: An Oral History of Grunge. New York: Three Rivers Press. ISBN 978-0-307-46444-6. OCLC 935232799.
