= 35th Annual Grammy Awards =

1993 US music awards ceremony

- Official poster
- Date: February 24, 1993
- Location: Shrine Auditorium, Los Angeles, California
- Hosted by: Garry Shandling

Highlights
- Most awards: Eric Clapton (6)
- Most nominations: Eric Clapton (9)
- Record YR.: "Tears in Heaven"
- Album YR.: Unplugged
- Song YR.: "Tears in Heaven"
- New Artist: Arrested Development
- Person YR.: Natalie Cole
- Website: www.grammy.com

Television/radio coverage
- Network: CBS
- Runtime: circa 150 minutes
- Viewership: 30.0 million viewers
- Produced by: Matt Sager · Tzvi Small

The 35th Annual Grammy Awards were held on February 24, 1993 and recognized accomplishments by musicians from the previous year. The nominations were announced on January 7, 1993. The evening's host was the American stand-up comedian Garry Shandling, who hosted the ceremony for the third time. The CBS network broadcast the show live from the Shrine Auditorium in Los Angeles, California.

This particular Grammy live broadcast was the commercially most successful of its kind in the 1990s. As Nielsen Media Research and Billboard magazine stated on January 10, 2004, "the highest-rated Grammy show of the 1990s was the 1993 telecast, which got a 19.9 rating/31 share and 30 million United States viewers" alone. British guitarist and singer Eric Clapton was the night's big winner, winning six awards out of nine nominations including Album, Song and Record of the Year.

Michael Jackson received the Grammy Legend Award from his sister Janet Jackson. A small segment of the show was "How to Become a Legend" narrated by Janet.

== Performers ==
Artist(s)	Song(s)
Peter Gabriel	"Steam"
k. d. lang	"Constant Craving"
Red Hot Chili Peppers with George Clinton and P-Funk	"Give It Away"
Vanessa Williams	"Save the Best for Last"
En Vogue	"My Lovin' (You're Never Gonna Get It)"
Tony Bennett & Natalie Cole	"The Lady Is a Tramp"
Travis Tritt & Marty Stuart	"The Whiskey Ain't Workin'"
Arrested Development	"People Everyday"
Billy Ray Cyrus	"Achy Breaky Heart"
Mervyn Warren with Los Angeles Master Chorale	"Hallelujah!"
Celine Dion & Peabo Bryson	"Beauty and the Beast"
Arturo Sandoval featuring the GRP All-Stars Ensemble	"Cherokee"
Eric Clapton	"Tears in Heaven"

== Presenters ==
- Janet Jackson – Grammy Legend Award to Michael Jackson
- Tina Turner & Garry Shandling – Record of the Year
- Tony Bennett & Natalie Cole – Album of the Year
- Bonnie Raitt & Lyle Lovett – Song of the Year
- Lindsey Buckingham, Melissa Etheridge & Vince Gill – Producer of the Year
- BeBe Winans, Mark Wahlberg & Mary Chapin Carpenter – Best New Artist
- LL Cool J – Best Rap Performance by a Duo or Group
- B.B. King & Billy Idol – Best Hard Rock Performance
- Pam Tillis & Lorrie Morgan – Best Male Country Vocal Performance
- Jon Secada & Kenny G – Best R&B Performance by a Duo or Group with Vocals
- Boyz II Men & Patti LaBelle – Best Female Pop Vocal Performance
- Gloria Estefan & James Brown – Best Male Pop Vocal Performance
- Sergio Mendes & Herbie Hancock –

== Award winners ==
- Record of the Year
- "Tears in Heaven" - Eric Clapton, performer - Russ Titelman, producer
  - "Achy Breaky Heart" - Billy Ray Cyrus, performer - Joe Scaife & Jim Cotton, producers
  - "Beauty and the Beast" - Celine Dion & Peabo Bryson, performers - Walter Afanasieff, producer
  - "Constant Craving" - k.d. lang, performer - Greg Penny, Ben Mink & k.d. lang, producers
  - "Save the Best for Last" - Vanessa Williams, performer - Keith Thomas, producer
- Album of the Year
- Unplugged - Eric Clapton, performer - Russ Titelman, producer
  - Achtung Baby - U2, performers - Daniel Lanois, Brian Eno & Steve Lillywhite, producers
  - Beauty and the Beast - Various Artists, performers - Howard Ashman, Alan Menken & Walter Afanasieff, producers
  - Diva - Annie Lennox, performer - Stephen Lipson, producer
  - Ingenue - k.d. lang, performer - Greg Penny, Ben Mink & k.d. lang, producers
- Song of the Year
- "Tears in Heaven" - Eric Clapton and Will Jennings, songwriters - Eric Clapton, performer
  - "Achy Breaky Heart" - Don Von Tress, songwriter - Billy Ray Cyrus, performer
  - "Beauty and the Beast" - Alan Menken and Howard Ashman, songwriters - Celine Dion and Peabo Bryson, performers
  - "Constant Craving" - k.d. lang and Ben Mink, songwriters - k.d. lang, performer
  - "Save the Best for Last" - Wendy Waldman, Jon Lind and Phil Galdston, songwriters - Vanessa Williams, performer
- Best New Artist
- Arrested Development
  - Billy Ray Cyrus
  - Sophie B. Hawkins
  - Kris Kross
  - Jon Secada

=== Alternative ===
- Best Alternative Music Album
  - Tom Waits for Bone Machine

=== Blues ===
- Best Traditional Blues Album
  - Dr. John for Goin' Back to New Orleans
- Best Contemporary Blues Album
  - Stevie Ray Vaughan & Double Trouble for The Sky Is Crying

=== Children's ===
- Best Album for Children
  - Alan Menken & Howard Ashman (songwriters) for Beauty and the Beast - Original Motion Picture Soundtrack performed by various artists

=== Classical ===
- Best Orchestral Recording
  - Leonard Bernstein (conductor) & the Berlin Philharmonic Orchestra for Mahler: Symphony No. 9
- Best Classical Vocal Performance
  - Kathleen Battle & Margo Garrett for Kathleen Battle at Carnegie Hall (Handel, Mozart, Liszt, Strauss, etc.)
- Best Opera Recording
  - Christopher Raeburn, Stephen Trainor, Morten Winding (producers), Georg Solti (conductor), Hildegard Behrens, José van Dam, Plácido Domingo, Sumi Jo, Reinhild Runkel, Julia Varady & the Vienna Philharmonic Orchestra for R. Strauss: Die Frau Ohne Schatten
- Best Performance of a Choral Work
  - Herbert Blomstedt (conductor), Vance George (choir director), the San Francisco Symphony Orchestra, the San Francisco Boys Chorus & the San Francisco Girls Chorus for Orff: Carmina Burana
- Best Classical Performance - Instrumental Solo With Orchestra
  - Lorin Maazel (conductor), Yo-Yo Ma & the Pittsburgh Symphony Orchestra for Prokofiev: Sinfonia Concertante - Tchaikovsky: Variations on a Rococo Theme
- Best Classical Performance - Instrumental Solo Without Orchestra
  - Vladimir Horowitz for Horowitz - Discovered Treasures (Chopin, Liszt, Scarlatti, Scriabin, Clementi)
- Best Chamber Music Performance
  - Emanuel Ax & Yo-Yo Ma for Brahms: Sonatas for Cello & Piano
- Best Contemporary Composition
  - Samuel Barber (composer), Andrew Schnenck (conductor) & the Chicago Symphony Orchestra for Barber: The Lovers
- Best Classical Album
  - Horst Dittberner (producer), Leonard Bernstein (conductor) & the Berlin Philharmonic Orchestra for Mahler: Symphony No. 9

=== Comedy ===
- Best Comedy Album
  - Peter Schickele for P.D.Q. Bach: Music for an Awful Lot of Winds and Percussion

=== Composing and arranging ===
- Best Instrumental Composition
  - Benny Carter (composer) for Harlem Renaissance Suite
- Best Song Written Specifically for a Motion Picture or Television
  - Howard Ashman & Alan Menken (songwriters) for Beauty and the Beast performed by Peabo Bryson & Céline Dion
- Best Instrumental Composition Written for a Motion Picture or for Television
  - Alan Menken (composer) for Beauty and the Beast performed by various artists
- Best Arrangement on an Instrumental
  - Rob McConnell (arranger) for Strike Up the Band performed by Rob McConnell & The Boss Brass
- Best Instrumental Arrangement Accompanying Vocal(s)
  - Johnny Mandel (arranger) for Here's to Life performed by Shirley Horn

=== Country ===
- Best Country Vocal Performance, Female
  - Mary Chapin Carpenter for "I Feel Lucky"
- Best Country Vocal Performance, Male
  - Vince Gill for "I Still Believe in You"
- Best Country Performance by a Duo or Group with Vocal
  - Emmylou Harris & the Nash Ramblers for Emmylou Harris & the Nash Ramblers at the Ryman
- Best Country Vocal Collaboration
  - Marty Stuart & Travis Tritt for "The Whiskey Ain't Workin'"
- Best Country Instrumental Performance
  - Chet Atkins & Jerry Reed for Sneakin' Around
- Best Country Song
  - Vince Gill and John Barlow Jarvis (songwriters) for "I Still Believe in You", performed by Vince Gill
- Best Bluegrass Album
  - Alison Krauss & Union Station for Every Time You Say Goodbye

=== Folk ===
- Best Traditional Folk Album
  - The Chieftains for An Irish Evening - Live at the Grand Opera House, Belfast
- Best Contemporary Folk Album
  - The Chieftains for Another Country

=== Gospel ===
- Best Pop Gospel Album
  - Steven Curtis Chapman for The Great Adventure
- Best Rock/Contemporary Gospel Album
  - Petra for Unseen Power
- Best Traditional Soul Gospel Album
  - Shirley Caesar for He's Working It Out For You
- Best Contemporary Soul Gospel Album
  - Mervyn E. Warren (producer) for Handel's Messiah - A Soulful Celebration performed by various artists
- Best Southern Gospel Album
  - Bruce Carroll for Sometimes Miracles Hide
- Best Gospel Album by a Choir or Chorus
  - Edwin Hawkins (choir director) for Edwin Hawkins Music & Arts Seminar Mass Choir - Recorded Live in Los Angeles performed by the Music & Arts Seminar Mass Choir

=== Historical ===
- Best Historical Album
  - Michael Cuscuna (producer) for The Complete Capitol Recordings of The Nat "King" Cole Trio

=== Jazz ===
- Best Jazz Instrumental Solo
  - Joe Henderson for "Lush Life" in Lush Life: The Music of Billy Strayhorn
- Best Jazz Instrumental Performance, Individual or Group
  - Branford Marsalis for I Heard You Twice the First Time
- Best Large Jazz Ensemble Performance
  - McCoy Tyner for The Turning Point
- Best Jazz Vocal Performance
  - Bobby McFerrin for "Round Midnight" in Play
- Best Contemporary Jazz Performance (Instrumental)
  - Pat Metheny for Secret Story

=== Latin ===
- Best Latin Pop Album
  - Jon Secada for Otro Día Más Sin Verte
- Best Tropical Latin Album
  - Linda Ronstadt for Frenesi
- Best Mexican-American Album
  - Linda Ronstadt for Mas Canciones

=== Musical show ===
- Best Musical Show Album
  - Jay David Saks (producer) & the New Broadway cast for Guys and Dolls - The New Broadway Cast Recording

=== Music video ===
- Best Music Video, Short Form
  - John Downer (video director & producer) & Peter Gabriel for Digging in the Dirt
- Best Music Video, Long Form
  - Rob Small (video producer), Sophie Muller (video director) & Annie Lennox for Diva

=== New Age ===
- Best New Age Album
  - Enya for Shepherd Moons

=== Packaging and notes ===
- Best Album Package
  - Melanie Nissen (art director) for Spellbound performed by Paula Abdul
- Best Album Notes
  - Ahmet Ertegun, Arif Mardin, Dave Marsh, David Ritz, Jerry Wexler, Thulani Davis & Tom Dowd (notes writers) for Queen of Soul - The Atlantic Recordings performed by Aretha Franklin

=== Polka ===
- Best Polka Album
  - Walter Ostanek for 35th Anniversary performed by Walter Ostanek & His Band

=== Pop ===
- Best Pop Vocal Performance, Female
  - k.d. lang for "Constant Craving"
- Best Pop Vocal Performance, Male
  - Eric Clapton for "Tears in Heaven"
- Best Pop Performance by a Duo or Group with Vocal
  - Celine Dion & Peabo Bryson for "Beauty and the Beast"
- Best Pop Instrumental Performance
  - Richard S. Kaufman (conductor) for "Beauty and the Beast"

=== Production and engineering ===
- Best Engineered Album, Non-Classical
  - Bruce Swedien & Teddy Riley (engineers) for Dangerous performed by Michael Jackson
- Best Engineered Album, Classical
  - James Lock, John Pellowe, Jonathan Stokes & Philip Siney (engineers), Georg Solti (conductor) & the Vienna Philharmonic for R. Strauss: Die Frau Ohne Schatten
- Producer of the Year (Non-Classical)
  - Babyface & L.A. Reid
  - Brian Eno & Daniel Lanois
- Classical Producer of the Year
  - Michael Fine

=== R&B ===
- Best R&B Vocal Performance, Female
  - Chaka Khan for The Woman I Am
- Best R&B Vocal Performance, Male
  - Al Jarreau for Heaven and Earth
- Best R&B Performance by a Duo or Group with Vocal
  - Boyz II Men for "End of the Road"
- Best R&B Instrumental Performance
  - Miles Davis for Doo-Bop
- Best Rhythm & Blues Song
  - Babyface, L.A. Reid & Daryl Simmons (songwriters) for "End of the Road" performed by Boyz II Men

=== Rap ===
- Best Rap Solo Performance
  - Sir Mix-a-Lot for "Baby Got Back"
- Best Rap Performance by a Duo or Group
  - Arrested Development for "Tennessee"

=== Reggae ===
- Best Reggae Album
  - Shabba Ranks for X-tra Naked

=== Rock ===
- Best Rock Vocal Performance, Female
  - Melissa Etheridge for "Ain't It Heavy"
- Best Rock Vocal Performance, Male
  - Eric Clapton for Unplugged
- Best Rock Performance by a Duo or Group with Vocal
  - U2 for Achtung Baby
- Best Rock Instrumental Performance
  - Stevie Ray Vaughan & Double Trouble for "Little Wing"
- Best Hard Rock Performance with Vocal
  - Red Hot Chili Peppers for "Give It Away"
- Best Metal Performance
  - Nine Inch Nails for "Wish"
- Best Rock Song
  - Eric Clapton & Jim Gordon (songwriters) for "Layla" performed by Eric Clapton

=== Spoken ===
- Best Spoken Word or Non-musical Album
  - Earvin "Magic" Johnson & Robert O'Keefe for What You Can Do to Avoid AIDS

=== Traditional pop ===
- Best Traditional Pop Vocal Performance
  - "Perfectly Frank" - Tony Bennett

=== World ===
- Best World Music Album
  - Sérgio Mendes for Brasileiro

== Special merit awards ==
=== MusiCares Person of the Year ===
- Natalie Cole

=== Grammy Legend Award ===
- Michael Jackson
