= Even Cowgirls Get the Blues (film) =

1993 film by Gus Van Sant

- Theatrical release poster
- Directed by: Gus Van Sant
- Screenplay by: Gus Van Sant
- Based on: Even Cowgirls Get the Blues by Tom Robbins
- Produced by: Eric McLeod; Laurie Parker; Gus Van Sant
- Starring: Uma Thurman; Lorraine Bracco; Angie Dickinson; Noriyuki "Pat" Morita; Keanu Reeves; John Hurt; Rain Phoenix
- Cinematography: John J. Campbell; Eric Alan Edwards
- Edited by: Curtiss Clayton; Gus Van Sant
- Music by: k.d. lang; Ben Mink
- Production company: Fourth Vision
- Distributed by: Fine Line Features
- Release dates: September 13, 1993 (TIFF); May 20, 1994
- Running time: 96 minutes
- Country: United States
- Language: English
- Budget: $8.5 million
- Box office: $1.7 million

Even Cowgirls Get the Blues is a 1993 American romantic comedy-drama Western film based on Tom Robbins' 1976 novel of the same title. The film was written and directed by Gus Van Sant (credited as Gus Van Sant Jr.) and stars an ensemble cast led by Uma Thurman, Lorraine Bracco, Angie Dickinson, Noriyuki "Pat" Morita, Keanu Reeves, John Hurt, and Rain Phoenix. Robbins himself narrates. The soundtrack is sung entirely by k.d. lang. The film is dedicated to the late River Phoenix.

== Plot ==
Sissy Hankshaw is a woman born with a mutation (she would not call it a defect) giving her enormously large thumbs. Sissy makes the most of her thumbs by becoming a hitchhiker. Her travels eventually take her to New York City, where she becomes a model for a homosexual feminine hygiene products mogul, known as "The Countess". A few years later, he introduces her to his "beauty ranch", the Rubber Rose Ranch. The main plot revolves around the cowgirls who work at the ranch after they violently take over and drug the endangered whooping cranes that nest along the lake on their land, making the once migratory birds stay. The cowgirls end up in a showdown with government agencies because the cranes will not leave the ranch and the cowgirls refuse to allow the men on the ranch to take the cranes. Sissy and the ranch leader, Bonanza Jellybean, have a brief love affair. After a fatal shootout between the cowgirls and the various agencies, the cranes leave, and Sissy takes over running the ranch.

== Cast ==
- Tom Robbins (voice) as Narrator
- Uma Thurman as Sissy Hankshaw
  - Treva Jeffryes as young Sissy
- Lorraine Bracco as Delores Del Ruby
- Angie Dickinson as Miss Adrian
- Noriyuki "Pat" Morita as The Chink
- Keanu Reeves as Julian Gitche
- John Hurt as The Countess
- Rain Phoenix as Bonanza Jellybean
- Roseanne Arnold as Madame Zoe
- Ed Begley Jr. as Rupert
- Crispin Glover as Howard Barth
- Buck Henry as Dr. Dreyfus
- Carol Kane as Carla
- Sean Young as Marie Barth
- Victoria Williams as Cowgirl Debbie
- Grace Zabriskie as Mrs. Hankshaw
- Ken Kesey as Mr. Hankshaw
- Heather Graham as Cowgirl Heather
- Udo Kier as Commercial Director
- Lin Shaye as Rubber Rose Maid
- William Burroughs as Himself
- Edward James Olmos as Musician at Barbecue

== Production ==
Even Cowgirls Get the Blues was shot throughout Oregon: Portland, Terrebonne, Sisters, and Bend.

Though some viewers claim that River Phoenix is visible in a brief cameo near the end of the film, director Gus Van Sant, costar Udo Kier, and Phoenix's own assistant at the time, Sue Solgot, all assert that Phoenix was not in the film. Van Sant states, "River wasn't even in the desert when we shot. That is Jim Baldwin in the beekeeper's hat."

The film was set to be released in the fall of 1993, but was delayed for post-production edits after Van Sant was dissatisfied with the cut screened at the 1993 Toronto International Film Festival. Among the changes Van Sant made were cuts to the New York-set scenes and scenes showing Sissy's relationship with Julian Gitche (the character played by Keanu Reeves), in favor of featuring more ranch scenes and focusing more attention on the relationship between Sissy and Bonanza Jellybean. A subplot about the Clock People, who are keepers of the keys to cosmic consciousness and whose presence in the story is signified by the image of the clock on the film's poster, was excised from the final film. A part played by Steve Buscemi was also cut.

== Reception ==
The film was a critical and commercial failure. The picture opened in wide release on May 20, 1994, and grossed a mere $1,708,873 against an estimated $8.5 million budget.

On Rotten Tomatoes, it has a 17% approval rating based on 30 reviews, with an average score of 3.5/10. On Metacritic the film has a score of 28% based on reviews from 16 critics, indicating "generally unfavorable" reviews.

Film historian and critic Leonard Maltin said: "The novel was hopelessly dated, and there is not enough peyote in the entire American Southwest to render this movie comprehensible or endurable...K.D. Lang's [sic] score is the picture's sole worthy component."

Nathan Rabin of The A.V. Club called the film "forgettable", "tedious", "god-awful", and nearly unwatchable.

Richard F. Weingroff of the Federal Highway Administration commented: "Forget it - skip this lousy movie and read the novel by Tom Robbins."

=== Year-end lists ===
- First worst – Robert Denerstein, Rocky Mountain News
- First worst – Janet Maslin, The New York Times
- Second worst – Desson Howe, The Washington Post
- Eighth worst – Peter Travers, Rolling Stone
- Top 10 worst (not ranked) – Dan Webster, The Spokesman-Review
- Top 12 worst (not ranked) – David Elliott, The San Diego Union-Tribune
- Dishonorable mention – William Arnold, Seattle Post-Intelligencer
- Worst (not ranked) – Bob Ross, The Tampa Tribune
- #1 Worst - Michael Medved, Sneak Previews
- #3 Worst - Jeffrey Lyons, Sneak Previews

=== Accolades ===
- Golden Raspberry Award for Worst Actress - Uma Thurman (nominated - lost to Sharon Stone for Intersection and The Specialist)
- Golden Raspberry Award for Worst Supporting Actress - Sean Young (nominated - lost to Rosie O'Donnell for Car 54, Where Are You?, Exit to Eden, and The Flintstones)

== Home media ==
The film was released on Region 1 DVD on November 2, 2004, containing its original aspect ratio of 1.85:1 and on NTSC LaserDisc by Image Entertainment in late 1994, also in its original aspect ratio. It received a second DVD release in the United States from UCA on April 6, 2010, in a new cropped 1.78:1 widescreen version.

In 2007, the film received its first DVD release in the UK from Universal Pictures Home Entertainment in a 1.33:1 full frame version.

== Soundtrack ==
Even Cowgirls Get the Blues

Soundtrack album by k.d. lang
- Released: November 2, 1993
- Genre: Country
- Label: Sire

K.d. lang chronology
Ingénue (1992)	Even Cowgirls Get the Blues (1993)	All You Can Eat (1995)

Professional ratings
Review scores
Source	Rating
AllMusic	3/5 stars
Robert Christgau	(neither)
Entertainment Weekly	B
Los Angeles Times	2.5/4 stars
Music Week	3/5 stars
NME	(8/10)
Philadelphia Inquirer	3/4 stars
Q	4/5 stars
Rolling Stone	4/5 stars

The soundtrack was released on November 2, 1993, by Sire Records. k.d. lang performed the music. The album was composed by lang and Ben Mink. The soundtrack went top ten in Australia and top five in New Zealand (numbers ten and four, respectively), and peaked at number 82 on the Billboard 200 in the United States.

1. "Just Keep Me Moving" (3:56)
2. "Much Finer Place" (0:51)
3. "Or Was I" (3:07)
4. "Hush Sweet Lover" (4:05)
5. "Myth" (4:08)
6. "Apogee" (0:37)
7. "Virtual Vortex" (0:44)
8. "Lifted by Love" (3:02)
9. "Overture" (2:03)
10. "Kundalini Yoga Waltz" (1:07)
11. "In Perfect Dreams" (3:07)
12. "Curious Soul Astray" (3:40)
13. "Ride of Bonanza Jellybean" (1:47)
14. "Don't Be a Lemming Polka" (2:17)
15. "Sweet Little Cherokee" (2:48)
16. "Cowgirl Pride" (1:47)

=== Chart performance ===
Chart (1993)	Peak position
Canadian RPM Country Albums	6
Canadian RPM Top Albums	47
U.S. Billboard 200	82

=== Certifications ===
Region	Certification	Certified units/sales
Australia (ARIA)	Platinum	70,000^{^}
^{^} Shipments figures based on certification alone.

== See also ==
- List of American films of 1994
- Cowgirl
- Tom Robbins
