= Be Still My Soul =

Be Still My Soul may refer to:

- "Be Still, My Soul" (hymn), a Christian hymn set to Finlandia
- Be Still My Soul (Abigail album)
- Be Still My Soul (Selah album)
