= Abigail (singer) =

English singer

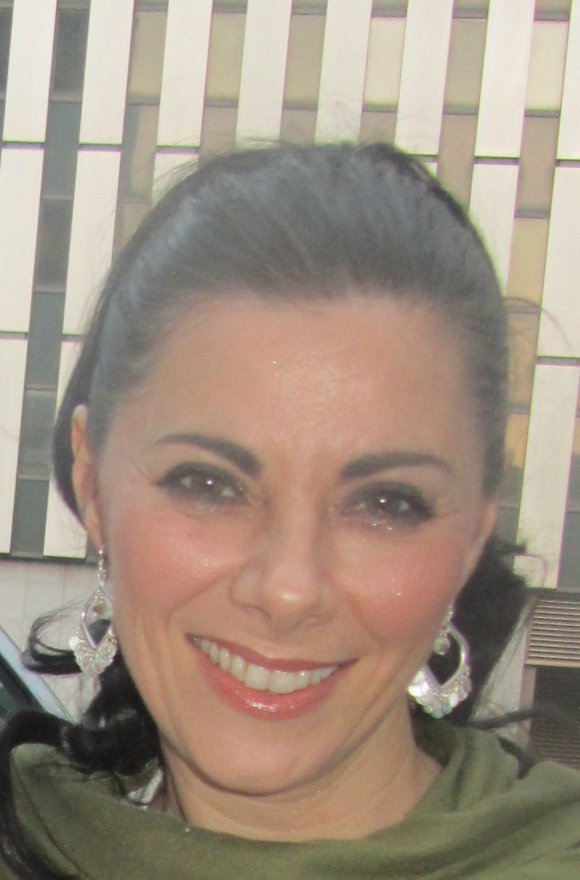
- Photo taken in Pittsburgh, 11 June 2011

Background information
- Born: Abigail Zsiga; Warrington, Cheshire, England
- Origin: England
- Genres: Hi-NRG, electronic, house, breakbeat
- Occupations: Singer, songwriter, dancer, painter
- Instruments: Guitar, piano
- Years active: 1992–present
- Labels: Klone, ZYX, Groovilicious, Carrillo, Performance Anxiety, Eden, Water Lily
- Website: abigailzsiga.com

Abigail (full name Abigail Zsiga) is an English electronic music artist. She first came into the limelight with the song "I Feel You", released in 1992.

== Career ==
Abigail has released hi-NRG covers of popular songs on both sides of the Atlantic. Some of those are k.d. lang's "Constant Craving", R.E.M.'s "Losing My Religion" and Nirvana's "Smells Like Teen Spirit", which peaked at No. 29 on the UK Singles Chart. Abigail's debut album Feel Good was released in 1995, on the UK based label Klone Records. Her 1999 hit single "Let the Joy Rise" was produced by the production duo Thunderpuss. In 2000, she hit No. 1 on the Billboard Dance chart with her song "If It Don't Fit", also produced by Thunderpuss. She had a second No. 1 Dance hit in 2001 with "You Set Me Free". In 2003, Abigail released "Falling" which peaked at No. 9. After "Falling", she released "Songbird" which was remixed by DJ DoNut and was available as a digital download. After this, Abigail decided it was time for a change and added her last name to her recordings.

She released the album Home...Again in 2005.

In 2006, she lent her vocals to the 10 Monkeys' album Lay Down. Then in 2009, she was featured on DJ Bill Bennett's album, Forever Young.

Her 2010 album Be Still My Soul is a collection of hymns including "Amazing Grace", "How Great Thou Art" and "Be Still My Soul".

In 2013, she made a return to the dance scene with "Surrender" with Bouvier & Barona after a brief hiatus.

Abigail is also a supporter of the international human rights organisation, Love146.

== Discography ==
=== Albums ===
- 1995: Feel Good (Klone Records)
- 2006: Home...Again (Performance Anxiety Music)
- 2010: Be Still My Soul
- 2014: Another Year

=== Singles ===
- 1992: "I Feel You" (Love Decade featuring Gail) (All Around the World) – UK No. 34
- 1993: "Could It Be Magic" (Klone Records)
- 1993: "Constant Craving" (Klone Records)
- 1994: "Losing My Religion" (Klone Records)
- 1994: "Smells Like Teen Spirit" (Klone Records) – UK No. 29
- 1994: "Don't You Wanna Know" (ZYX Music) – UK No. 94
- 1995: "Constant Craving 95" (ZYX Music)
- 1996: "Night Moves On" (Pulse-8 Records)
- 1997: The Double Take EP (Klone Records)
- 1999: "Let the Joy Rise" (InterHit Records)
- 2000: "If It Don't Fit" (Groovilicious Records)
- 2001: "You Set Me Free" (Groovilicious Records)
- 2003: "Falling" (independent release)
- 2005: "Songbird" (Beatport.com)
- 2006: "Lay Down" (with 10 Monkeys) (Eden Music)
- 2009: "Forever Young" (DJ Bill Bennett featuring Abigail)
- 2013: "Surrender" (Bouvier & Barona featuring Abigail) (Carrillo Music)
- 2015: "Let the Joy Rise" (Abigail featuring DJ Toy Armada & DJ Grind) (Swishcraft)
- 2016: "February – Our Last Kiss" (DJ Joe Guthreaux featuring Abigail) (Swishcraft)

=== Other music ===
- "AM Radio" (released to iPod Street Team Winner)
- "In Spite of You" released to iPod Street Team Winner
- "You Came (Rehearsal)" released to iPod Street Team Winner
- "Magical Make Believe" never released, leaked on the Internet by the producer by mistake
- "That's Where I'll Be" never released, clips of the song were available on her website
- "You Set Me Free (acoustic)" released to people who joined her mailing list in autumn/winter 2010

== Industry awards ==
DMA magazine - Dance Music Authority Hi-NRG Awards

Year	Nominee / work	Award	Result
1993	Herself	Best NewComer	Won

Year	Nominee / work	Award	Result
1995	Herself	Artist of the Year	Won

== See also ==
- List of Billboard number-one dance singles of 2000
- List of Billboard number-one dance singles of 2001
- List of artists who reached number one on the U.S. Dance Club Songs chart
