= Lifted by Love =

1993 single performed by k.d. lang

Single by k.d. lang

from the album Even Cowgirls Get the Blues soundtrack
- Released: 1993
- Genre: House
- Length: 3:03
- Label: Sire; Warner Bros.
- Songwriters: k.d. lang; Ben Mink
- Producers: k.d. lang; Ben Mink

K.d. lang singles chronology
| "Just Keep Me Moving" (1993) | "Lifted by Love" (1993) | "If I Were You" (1995) |

"Lifted by Love" is a song performed by Canadian singer-songwriter k.d. lang, co-written with Ben Mink. It was featured in the 1993 film Even Cowgirls Get the Blues, as well as the soundtrack album. It was the first of two number one singles on the US dance chart for lang, remaining on the chart for a total of thirteen weeks.

== Critical reception ==
Professional ratings
Review scores
| Source | Rating |
|---|---|
| AllMusic | 4/5 stars |

Sam Wood from Philadelphia Inquirer wrote, "East L.A. meets Rodeo Drive on 'Lifted by Love', with a bassline appropriated from War's 'Low Rider'." Renée Christ from Spin described the song as "part disco, part Chicago covering Pink Floyd's 'Wish You Were Here' (in style at least), where the dreamy chord progressions showcase lang's golden pipes beyond Peter Cetera's wildest imaginings."

== Track listing ==
- US 12-inch vinyl maxi-single

A1. "Lifted by Love" (Elevate Your Love Mix) – 6:20
A2. "Lifted by Love" (Vocal Tribal Dub) – 5:32
A3. "Lifted by Love" (Lifted by Dub) – 9:04
B1. "No More Tears (Enough Is Enough)" (Classic Club Mix) – 6:04
B2. "No More Tears (Enough Is Enough)" (Tribalism Mix) – 6:11
B3. "No More Tears (Enough Is Enough)" (Boriqua Beats) – 2:46
B4. "Lifted by Love" (Radio Remix Edit) – 3:14

- US 12-inch vinyl single

A1. "Lifted by Love" (Elevate Your Love Mix) – 6:20
A2. "Lifted by Love" (Radio Remix Edit) – 3:14
B1. "Lifted by Love" (Vocal Tribal Dub) – 5:32
B2. "Lifted by Love" (Lifted by Dub) – 9:04

- US CD maxi-single
1. "Lifted by Love" (Club Xanax Mix) – 4:00
2. "Lifted by Love" (Elevate Your Love Mix) – 6:20
3. "No More Tears (Enough Is Enough)" (Classic Club Mix) – 6:04
4. "Miss Chatelaine" (St. Tropez Mix) – 5:32
5. "Just Keep Me Moving" (Movin' Mix) – 6:39
- Australian CD single
1. "Lifted by Love" (Radio Remix Edit) – 3:14
2. "Lifted by Love" (Album Version) – 3:03
3. "Lifted by Love" (Club Xanax Mix) – 4:00
4. "Lifted by Love" (Orange #7) – 3:19

== Charts ==
| Chart (1994) | Peak positions |
|---|---|
| US Dance Club Songs (Billboard) | 1 |
| US Maxi-Singles Sales (Billboard) | 25 |

== See also ==
- List of number-one dance singles of 1994 (U.S.)
