= Pink (Van Sant novel) =

1997 novel written by filmmaker Gus Van Sant

- Author: Gus Van Sant
- Language: English
- Genre: Philosophical novel, absurdist fiction
- Publisher: Nan A. Talese
- Publication date: 1997
- Publication place: United States of America
- Pages: 272
- ISBN: 978-0385488280

Pink is a novel written by filmmaker Gus Van Sant. It was published in 1997 on the Nan Talese imprint of Doubleday.

== Summary ==
The story is set in Saquatch, Oregon, United States, and details the life of Spunky Davis, a middle-aged maker of infomercials who is trying to find his next assignment and finish the science-fiction screenplay that he hopes will bring him Hollywood glory. The science-fiction screenplay sections of the book were written by Lanny Quarles. Spunky meets Jack and Matt who are from another dimension called Pink. The book has a flip-book element and other drawings that were created by Van Sant himself.
