= All You Can Eat (k.d. lang album) =

Studio album by k.d. lang
- Released: October 10, 1995
- Studios: Placebo Sound, Placebow Sound (Vancouver, BC)
- Genre: Pop
- Length: 36:09
- Label: Warner Bros.
- Producers: k.d. lang; Ben Mink

K.d. lang chronology
| Ingénue (1992) | All You Can Eat (1995) | Drag (1997) |

All You Can Eat is the third solo album by Canadian singer k.d. lang, released in October 1995.

== Reception ==
Professional ratings
Review scores
| Source | Rating |
|---|---|
| AllMusic | 4/5 stars |
| Cash Box | (favorable) |
| Chicago Tribune | 2.5/4 stars |
| Robert Christgau | (neither) |
| Entertainment Weekly | A |
| Los Angeles Times | 2/4 stars |
| NME | 7/10 |
| Rolling Stone | 3/5 stars |
| Spin | 7/10 |

In a Rolling Stone review, Barry Walters wrote "The rhythms and sonic textures draw from the vintage soul of Al Green, while the stark arrangements and lush melodies embrace the primal sophistication of trend-bucking college-radio faves like Björk and PJ Harvey without evoking either. By holding back on vocal volume and letting her creativity loose, Kathryn Dawn ultimately expresses much more. Traditional torch and twang gave her something to master and rebel against, but sublimely sensual art pop has set lang free."

David Browne of Entertainment Weekly described the album as "Ten meditations on unrequited desire, courtship, rejection, and sex, All You Can Eat is both the most brazen and conventional album she’s ever made, and one of her best. With each new album, lang has gradually toned down the often cloying cowpunk giddiness of her early work. That course continues with Eat, a sober album that musically and lyrically picks up where Ingénue‘s hit 'Constant Craving' left off. The songs are a series of pleas to a lover to allow our tortured chanteuse into her life, each one highlighting varying degrees of optimism, confusion, and bleakness."

In an AllMusic review, Stephen Thomas Erlewine called it "a more experimental and realized record than its predecessor Ingénue."

== Track listing ==
All songs written and composed by k.d. lang and Ben Mink

1. "If I Were You" – 3:59
2. "Maybe" – 4:11
3. "You're Ok" – 3:03
4. "Sexuality" – 3:24
5. "Get Some" – 3:37
6. "Acquiesce" – 3:33
7. "This" – 4:02
8. "World of Love" – 3:44
9. "Infinite and Unforeseen" – 2:57
10. "I Want It All" – 3:39

== Personnel ==
- k.d. lang – guitar, harp, ukelin, banjo, glass harmonica, keyboard, vocals
- Teddy Borowiecki – organ, synthesizer, piano, keyboard, Fender Rhodes
- Graham Boyle – percussion
- John Friesen – cello
- Ben Mink – bass, guitar, violin, keyboard, ukulele, viola
- David Piltch – bass
- Randall Stoll – drums

== In other media ==
The song "Sexuality" was also released on the album Friends (Music from the TV Series).

== Charts ==
=== Weekly charts ===
Weekly chart performance for All You Can Eat
| Chart (1995) | Peak position |
|---|---|
| Australian Albums (ARIA) | 3 |
| Canada Top Albums/CDs (RPM) | 10 |
| Dutch Albums (Album Top 100) | 89 |
| New Zealand Albums (RMNZ) | 1 |
| Swedish Albums (Sverigetopplistan) | 48 |
| UK Albums (Official Charts) | 7 |
| US Billboard 200 | 37 |

=== Year-end charts ===
1995 year-end chart performance for All You Can Eat
| Chart (1995) | Position |
|---|---|
| Australian Albums Chart | 44 |
| Canada Top Albums/CDs (RPM) | 90 |

=== Certifications ===
Certifications and sales for All You Can Eat
| Region | Certification | Certified units/sales |
|---|---|---|
| Australia (ARIA) | Platinum | 70,000^{^} |
| Canada (Music Canada) | Gold | 50,000^{^} |
| New Zealand (RMNZ) | Gold | 7,500^{^} |
| United Kingdom (BPI) | Silver | 60,000^{^} |
| United States (RIAA) | Gold | 500,000^{^} |
^{^} Shipments figures based on certification alone.
