= Miss Chatelaine =

1992 single by k.d. lang

Single by k.d. lang

from the album Ingénue
- Released: 1992
- Length: 3:49
- Label: Sire; Warner Bros.
- Songwriters: k.d. lang; Ben Mink
- Producers: Greg Penny; Ben Mink; k.d. lang

K.d. lang singles chronology
"Constant Craving" (1992)	"Miss Chatelaine" (1992)	"Just Keep Me Moving" (1993)

Music video
- "Miss Chatelaine" on YouTube

"Miss Chatelaine" is a song by Canadian singer-songwriter k.d. lang, released in 1992 by Sire and Warner Bros. as the second single from her second solo album, Ingénue (1992). Lang co-wrote the song with Ben Mink, and it was nominated for a Grammy Award in the category for Best Female Pop Vocal Performance, one year after her win in the same category for "Constant Craving". The title refers to the Canadian magazine Chatelaine, which named lang Woman of the Year in 1988. The accompanying music video was directed by American photographer and director Rocky Schenck.

== Critical reception ==
Larry Flick from Billboard magazine wrote, "Lang lovingly pays homage to Lawrence Welk on this dreamy entry from her brilliant Ingénue set. Strumming acoustic guitars are the bonding element in an arrangement of accordians [sic], violins, and other cool instruments. The crowning glory, of course, is lang's virtually flawless vocal performance." James Muretich from Calgary Herald viewed the song as "upbeat". A reviewer from Cash Box named it a "standout" cut from the album, noting the "Latin beat and accordion-and string backing". The Daily Vault's Jason Warburg stated, "She can get playful", as in the "rather campy" "Miss Chatelaine".

Stephanie Zacharek from Entertainment Weekly remarked that with its "sidewalk-café accordion accents", the song "could be the theme from a '60s French comedy about a happy-go-lucky heartbreaker who surprised herself by falling in love". Terry Staunton from Melody Maker noted that it "is the only 'up' song on the lovelorn diary that is the Ingénue album. This is the sound of lang in love, dancing round a fountain in a world where "clouds of qualm burst into sunshine." Parry Gettelman from Orlando Sentinel felt it "has a pretty string arrangement and moves along at a nice clip". People Magazine said the massed Modern Jazz Quartet, New York Philharmonic and R.E.M. "couldn't have propped up" such tracks as the "sing-songy" "Miss Chatelaine".

== Charts ==
Chart (1992–1993)	Peak position
Australia (ARIA)	145
Canada Top Singles (RPM)	58
Canada Adult Contemporary (RPM)	25
UK Singles (Official Charts)	68
UK Airplay (Music Week)	35
US Adult Contemporary (Billboard)	32

== Release history ==
Region	Date	Format(s)	Label(s)	Ref.
Canada	1992	Radio	Sire; Warner Bros.	
Australia	November 2, 1992	CD; cassette	Sire; Warner Bros.	
Australia	May 17, 1993	CD; cassette (re-release)	Sire; Warner Bros.	
United Kingdom	June 14, 1993	7-inch vinyl; CD; cassette	Sire; Warner Bros.	
Japan	July 25, 1993	CD	Sire; Warner Bros.	
