= Home...Again =

Studio album by Abigail
- Released: 2005
- Length: 0:41:48
- Label: Performance Anxiety Music

Home...Again is a studio album released by Abigail.

== Track listings ==
1. "You Came" written by Abigail Zsiga, Joel Edwards & Rob Barter - 3:23
2. "90 Miles" written by Abigail Zsiga & Michael Patzig - 4:03
3. "Songbird" written by Abigail Zsiga & Gustafsson - 4:32
4. "Better With You" written by Abigail Zsiga & Dimitri Ehrilch - 4:00
5. "It's Not Me" written by Abigail Zsiga, Fredrik Thomander & Anders Wikstrom - 3:52
6. "Wide Open" written by Abigail Zsiga & Mattias Gustafsson - 3:59
7. "Let It Go" written by Abigail Zsiga & Mattias Gustafsson - 3:13
8. "Home...again" written by Abigal Zsiga - 3:26
9. "Pity the Fool" written by Abigail Zsiga & Michael Patzig - 3:37
10. "Shine" written by Abigail Zsiga & Mattias Gustafsson - 3:47
11. "Let the Joy Rise" written by Darryl Zero, Janice Robinson & James Caruso - 3:56

Tracks 1, 3, 6, 7, & 10 produced by Mattias Gustafsson. Recording engineer Jon D'Uva. Recording & mix engineering Christian "Wicked" Wicht for www.christianwicked.com. Tracks 2 & 9 produced & engineer Michael Patzig. Mix engineer Jon D'Uva. Tracks 5, 8, & 11 produced by Abigail Zsiga. Track 5 recording engineer joe Carrano & Andrew Zsigmond. Mix engineer Christian "Wicked" Wicht. Track 8 engineered & mixed by Jon D'Uva. Track 11 recording engineer Joe Carrano. Mix engineer Jon D'Uva.

Recorded at Sonalyst Studios, Pavonia Studio, Nine Lives Studio, Moomba Studio, Performance Anxietgy Studio & Conduit Control Studio. Mastered by Tommy Dorsey at Masterfonics Studios.

== See also ==
- Abigail (singer)
