= If It Don't Fit =

2000 single by Abigail

Single by Abigail

from the album Circuit Sessions 00.1
- Released: 2000
- Genre: Hi-NRG
- Label: Groovilicious
- Songwriter(s): B. Cosgrove, K. Clark, & K. Yaylor-Good
- Producer(s): Thunderpuss (Chris Cox & Barry Harris)

Abigail singles chronology
"Let the Joy Rise" (1999)	"If It Don't Fit" (2000)	"You Set Me Free" (2000)

"If It Don't Fit" is Abigail's biggest hit to date, released in 2000. On the Billboard Hot Dance Club Play Chart, it went to number one for one week.

== Track listing ==
CD single

1. "If It Don't Fit" (Thunderpuss 2000 Radio Edit) - 3:48
2. "If It Don't Fit" (Eric Kupper Radio Edit) - 3:36
3. "If It Don't Fit" (Thunderpuss 2000 Club Mix) - 11:46
4. "If It Don't Fit" (Mike Macaluso Remix) - 9:46
5. "If It Don't Fit" (Eric Kupper Remix) - 6:33

Tracks 1 & 3 are remixed by Thunderpuss.
Tracks 2 & 5 are remixed by Eric Kupper.
Track 4 is remixed by Mike Macaluso.

12" vinyl single

1. "If It Don't Fit" (Thunderpuss Anthem Mix) - 11:45
2. "If It Don't Fit" (Thunderdub) - 7:15
3. "If It Don't Fit" (Thunderpuss Mix-Show Edit) - 7:30

12" vinyl single remixes

1. "If It Don't Fit" (Mike Macaluso Remix) - 9:40
2. "If It Don't Fit" (Eric Kupper 12" Mix) - 6:32
3. "If It Don't Fit" (Eric Kupper Dark Dub) - 6:17

== Unofficial remixes ==
1. "If It Don't Fit" (Stiener's Take It Easy Dub) - 6:32

== See also ==
- List of number-one dance singles of 2000 (U.S.)
