= Gus Van Sant =

American filmmaker (born 1952)

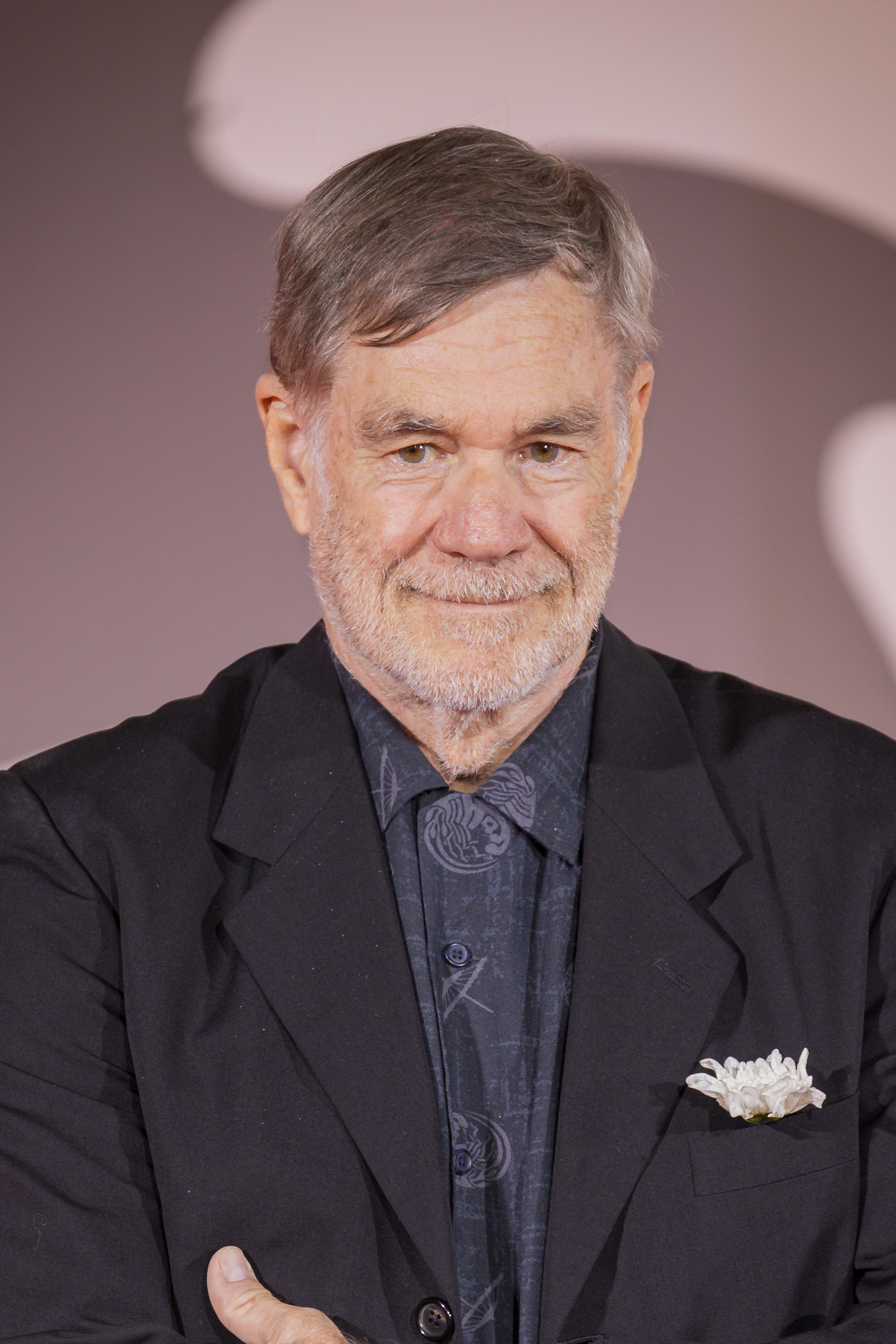
- Van Sant in 2025
- Born: Gus Green Van Sant Jr. July 24, 1952 (age 74); Louisville, Kentucky, U.S.
- Education: Rhode Island School of Design
- Occupations: Film director; film producer; screenwriter; film editor; photographer; painter; musician
- Years active: 1982–present

Gus Green Van Sant Jr. (born July 24, 1952) is an American filmmaker, photographer, painter, and musician. He has earned acclaim as an independent filmmaker, and is considered to be one of the most prominent auteurs of the new queer cinema movement. His films typically deal with themes of marginalized subcultures, especially within gay culture.

His early career was devoted to directing television commercials in the Pacific Northwest. He made his feature-length directorial debut film Mala Noche (1985). He earned acclaim for a string of independent films such as the crime drama Drugstore Cowboy (1989), the adventure film My Own Private Idaho (1991), and the black comedy To Die For (1995). He earned Academy Award for Best Director nominations for the drama Good Will Hunting (1997), and the biographical film Milk (2008), both of which also received Best Picture nominations.

Van Sant directed the psychological drama Elephant (2003), a film based on the Columbine High School massacre, for which he won the Palme d'Or and Best Director Award at the Cannes Film Festival. The reactions to Van Sant's creative output have since been mixed. He received positive reviews for Finding Forrester (2000), Paranoid Park (2007), Don't Worry, He Won't Get Far on Foot (2018) and Dead Man's Wire (2025), while receiving negative receptions for his films Even Cowgirls Get the Blues (1993), Psycho (1998), and The Sea of Trees (2015). His films Last Days (2005) and Promised Land (2012) received mixed reviews.

Also known for his work on television, he has directed and executive produced the political drama series Boss (2011), the docudrama miniseries When We Rise (2018), and the anthology series Feud: Capote vs. The Swans (2024). Van Sant has written screenplays for several of his earlier works, and has also published the novel, Pink, and a book of his photography, 108 Portraits, He has also released two musical albums.

== Early life and education ==
Van Sant was born and raised in Louisville, Kentucky, the son of Betty (née Seay) and Gus Green Van Sant Sr., a clothing manufacturer and traveling salesman who rapidly worked his way into middle class prosperity, holding executive marketing positions that included being president of the White Stag Manufacturing Company's apparel operation. As a result of his father's job, the family moved continually during his childhood.

Van Sant's paternal family is of partial Dutch origin; the name "Van Sant" is derived from the Dutch name "Van Zandt". The earliest Van Zandt arrived in the New Netherland area in the early 17th century, around what is now New York City.

Gus Van Sant is an alumnus of Darien High School in Darien, Connecticut, and The Catlin Gabel School in Portland, Oregon. One constant in the director's early years was his interest in visual arts (namely, painting and Super-8 filmmaking); while still in school he began making semi-autobiographical shorts costing between 30 and 50 dollars. Van Sant's artistic leanings took him to the Rhode Island School of Design in 1970, where his introduction to various avant-garde directors inspired him to change his major from painting to cinema.

== Career ==
=== 1982–1989: Early career ===
After spending time in Europe, Van Sant went to Los Angeles in 1976. He secured a job as a production assistant to filmmaker Ken Shapiro, with whom he developed a few ideas, none of which came to fruition. In 1981, Van Sant made Alice in Hollywood, a film about a naïve young actress who goes to Hollywood and abandons her ideals. It was never released. During this period, Van Sant began to spend time observing the denizens of the more down-and-out sections of Hollywood Boulevard. He became fascinated by the existence of this marginalized section of L.A.'s population, especially in context with the more ordinary, prosperous world that surrounded them. Van Sant would repeatedly focus his work on those existing on society's fringes, making his feature film directorial debut Mala Noche.

It was made two years after Van Sant went to New York to work in an advertising agency. He saved $20,000 during his tenure there, enabling him to finance the majority of his tale of doomed love between a gay liquor store clerk and a Mexican immigrant. The film, which was taken from Portland street writer Walt Curtis' semi-autobiographical novella, featured some of the director's hallmarks, notably an unfulfilled romanticism, a dry sense of the absurd, and the refusal to treat homosexuality as something deserving of judgment. Unlike many gay filmmakers, Van Sant—who had long been openly gay—declined to use same-sex relationships as fodder for overtly political statements, although such relationships would frequently appear in his films.

Shot in black-and-white, the film earned Van Sant almost overnight acclaim on the festival circuit, with the Los Angeles Times naming it the year's best independent film. The film's success attracted Hollywood interest, and Van Sant was briefly courted by Universal; the courtship ended after Van Sant pitched a series of project ideas (including what would become Drugstore Cowboy and My Own Private Idaho) that the studio declined to take interest in.

Van Sant returned to Portland, Oregon, where he set up house and began giving life to the ideas rejected by Universal. He directed Drugstore Cowboy about four drug addicts robbing pharmacies to support their habit. The film met with great critical success and revived the career of Matt Dillon.

=== 1990–1995: Indie and arthouse success ===
Drugstore Cowboy's exploration of the lives of those living on society's outer fringes, as well as its Portland setting, were mirrored in Van Sant's next effort, the similarly acclaimed My Own Private Idaho (1991). Only with the success of Cowboy was Van Sant now given license to make Idaho (a film he had originally pitched that was knocked back several times because the studios deemed the script 'too risky'). New Line Cinema now gave Van Sant the green light, and he went on a mission to get the Idaho script into the hands of River Phoenix and Keanu Reeves, his preferred choice for the two young leads. After months of struggle with agents and managers over the content of the script, Van Sant finally secured Phoenix and Reeves, who played the roles of Mike Waters and Scott Favor, respectively.

Centering on the dealings of two male hustlers (played by Phoenix and Reeves), the film was a compelling examination of unrequited love, alienation and the concept of family (a concept Van Sant repeatedly explores in his films). The film won him an Independent Spirit Award for his screenplay (he had won the same award for his Drugstore Cowboy screenplay), as well as greater prestige. The film gained River Phoenix best actor honors at the Venice Film Festival among others. It helped Reeves—previously best known for his work in the Bill and Ted movies—to get the critical respect that had eluded him.

Van Sant's next film, a 1993 adaptation of Tom Robbins' Even Cowgirls Get the Blues, was an excessive flop, both commercially and critically. Featuring an unusually large budget (for Van Sant, at least) of $8.5 million and a large, eclectic cast including Uma Thurman, John Hurt, Keanu Reeves and a newcomer in the form of River Phoenix's younger sister Rain (at Phoenix's suggestion), the film was worked and then reworked, but the finished product nonetheless resulted in something approaching a significant disaster.

Van Sant's 1995 film To Die For helped to restore his luster. An adaptation of Joyce Maynard's novel, the black comedy starred Nicole Kidman as a murderously ambitious weather girl; it also stars Matt Dillon as her hapless husband and, the third Phoenix sibling in as many projects, Joaquin Phoenix, as her equally hapless lover (River had died of a drug overdose a year and half earlier). It was Van Sant's first effort for a major studio (Columbia), and its success paved the way for further projects of the director's choosing. The same year, he served as executive producer for Larry Clark's Kids; it was a fitting assignment, due to both the film's subject matter and the fact that Clark's photographs of junkies had served as reference points for Van Sant's Drugstore Cowboy.

=== 1997–2003: Mainstream breakout ===
In 1997, Van Sant gained mainstream recognition and critical acclaim thanks to Good Will Hunting, which was written by Matt Damon and Ben Affleck. The film, about a troubled, blue-collar mathematical genius, was a huge critical and commercial success. It was nominated for nine Academy Awards, including Best Director for Van Sant. It won two, including Best Screenplay for Damon and Affleck, and Best Supporting Actor Oscar for Robin Williams, who, in his acceptance speech, referred to Van Sant as "being so subtle you're almost subliminal." Van Sant, Damon and Affleck parodied themselves and the film's success in Kevin Smith's Jay and Silent Bob Strike Back.

Van Sant received the opportunity to remake Alfred Hitchcock's classic Psycho. As opposed to reinterpreting the 1960 film, Van Sant opted to recreate the film shot-for-shot, in color, with a cast of young Hollywood A-listers. His decision was met with equal parts curiosity, skepticism, and derision from industry insiders and outsiders alike, and the finished result met with a similar reception. It starred Anne Heche, Vince Vaughn and Julianne Moore, and met with a negative critical reception and did poorly at the box office.

In 2000, Van Sant directed Finding Forrester, about a high-school student (Rob Brown) from the Bronx unlikely becoming a friend of a crusty, reclusive author (Sean Connery). Critical response was generally positive and became a box office success. In addition to directing, he devoted considerable energy to releasing two albums and publishing a novel, Pink, which was a thinly veiled exploration of his grief over River Phoenix's death.

=== 2003–present: Return to arthouse cinema ===
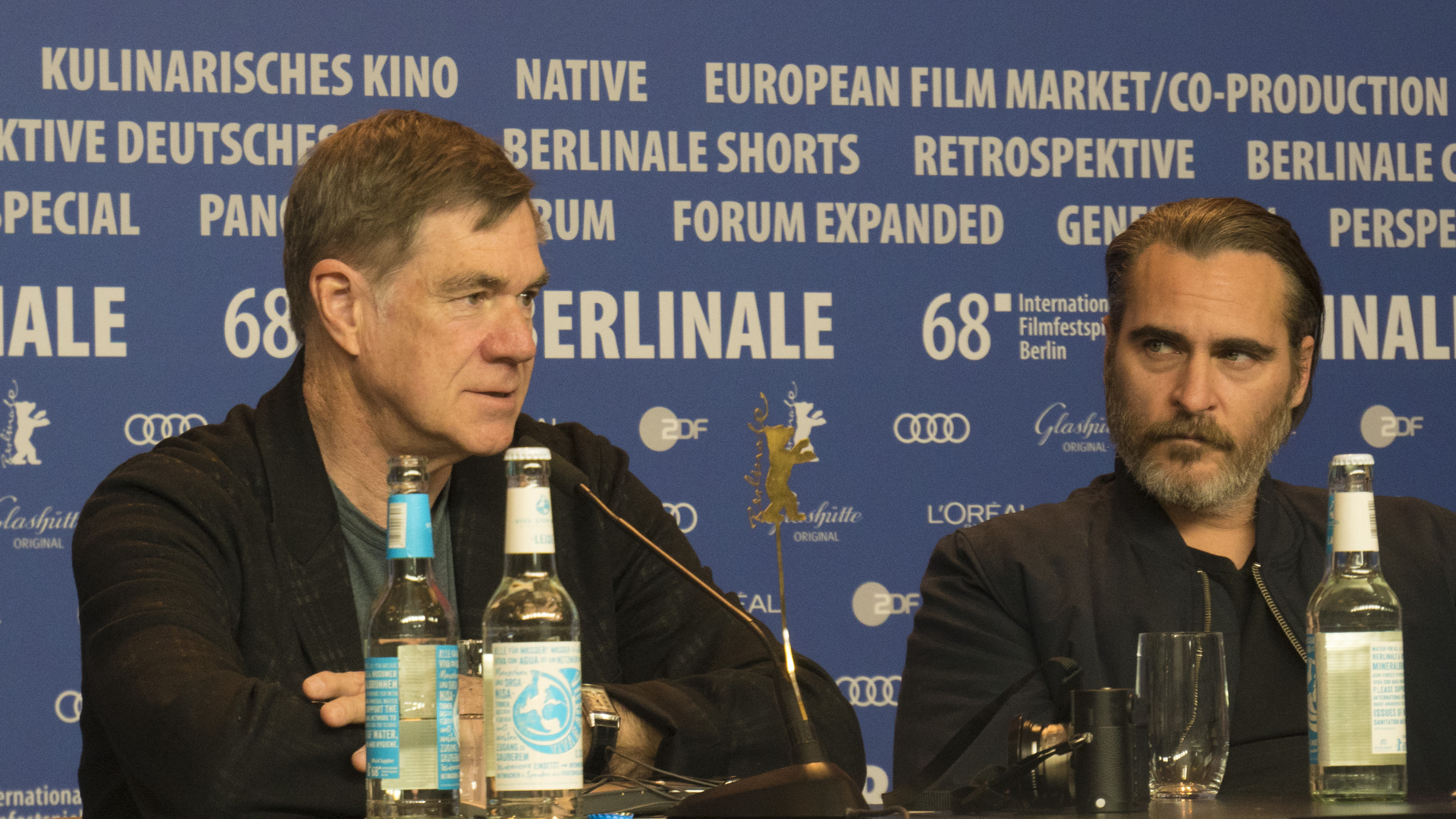
Van Sant and Joaquin Phoenix at the press conference of Don't Worry, He Won't Get Far on Foot (Berlin Film Festival 2018)

Van Sant traveled to the deserts of Argentina, Utah, and Death Valley for the production of 2002's Gerry, a loosely devised, largely improvised feature in which stars Matt Damon and Casey Affleck—both playing characters named Gerry—wander through the desert, discussing Wheel of Fortune, video games, and nothing in particular. The film premiered at the Sundance Film Festival.

It took Gerry over a year to make it to theaters, in which time Van Sant began production on his next film, Elephant. Approached by HBO and producer Diane Keaton to craft a fictional film based on the 1999 Columbine High School massacre, the director chose to shoot in his hometown of Portland, employing dozens of untrained, teen actors. Melding improvisational long takes like those in Gerry with Harris Savides' fluid camerawork, the film was influenced by Alan Clarke's 1989 film of the same name (see Elephant). The finished film provoked strong reactions from audiences at the 2003 Cannes Film Festival. At the Cannes festival, the jury awarded Elephant with their top prize, the Palme d'Or, and Van Sant with his first Best Director statue from the festival.

In 2005, Van Sant released Last Days, the final component of what he refers to as his "Death Trilogy", (the other parts being Gerry and Elephant). It is a fictionalized account of what happened to Nirvana frontman Kurt Cobain in the days leading up to his death. In 2006, Van Sant began work on Paranoid Park based on the book by Blake Nelson, about a skateboarding teenager who accidentally causes someone's death. The film was released in Europe in February 2008. He also directed the "Le Marais" segment of the omnibus film Paris, je t'aime.

Released in 2008, Van Sant's Milk is a biopic of openly gay San Francisco politician Harvey Milk, who was assassinated in 1978. The film received eight Oscar nominations at the 81st Academy Awards, including Best Picture, winning two for Best Actor in a Leading Role for Sean Penn, who starred as Milk, and Best Original Screenplay for writer Dustin Lance Black. Van Sant was nominated for Best Director. Van Sant later stated that his experience with Sean Penn on the film was "amazing". His 2011 film Restless was screened in the Un Certain Regard section at the 2011 Cannes Film Festival, and starred Henry Hopper and Mia Wasikowska.

Van Sant's film, Promised Land, was released on December 28, 2012. The film stars Frances McDormand, Matt Damon, and John Krasinski—the latter two co-wrote the screenplay based on a story by Dave Eggers. Filmed in April 2012, the production company, Focus Features, selected the release date so that the film is eligible to qualify for awards consideration. After Promised Land, Van Sant directed a film titled Sea of Trees, which starred Matthew McConaughey and Ken Watanabe. The film tells the story of a man who travels to the infamous Aokigahara suicide forest in Japan to kill himself, only to encounter another man wishing to kill himself as well, with whom he then embarks on a "spiritual journey". The film was selected to compete for the Palme d'Or at the 2015 Cannes Film Festival but was met with harsh critical reception at the Cannes, being booed and laughed at.

In December 2016, it was announced Van Sant would direct Don't Worry, He Won't Get Far on Foot, a biopic about cartoonist John Callahan, starring Joaquin Phoenix, Rooney Mara, Jonah Hill, Jack Black, and Mark Webber. Principal photography began in March 2017.

Dead Man's Wire (2025) starring Bill Skarsgård and Dacre Montgomery, and produced by Elevated Films and Balcony 9 Productions, marked his filmmaking return after almost ten years. The film had its world premiere out of competition at the 82nd Venice International Film Festival.

=== Other work ===
Van Sant released two musical albums: Gus Van Sant and 18 Songs About Golf. Van Sant played himself in episodes of the IFC series Portlandia and the HBO series Entourage.

Van Sant was credited for all photography, paintings and art direction on the Red Hot Chili Peppers' album Blood Sugar Sex Magik, and directed the video for "Under the Bridge". He directed the pilot for the Starz television program Boss, starring Kelsey Grammer. Van Sant went onto The Bret Easton Ellis Podcast in 2014 to discuss filmmaking, writing, film history and their collaborations that never got made (The Golden Suicides) and the one that did (The Canyons).

== Personal life ==
Van Sant is gay and lives in the Los Feliz neighborhood of Los Angeles.

== Archive ==
The moving image collection of Gus Van Sant is held at the Academy Film Archive. The archive has preserved many of Van Sant's short films, including The Happy Organ, Ken Death Gets Out of Jail, Five Ways to Kill Yourself, and others.

== Filmography ==
=== Short film ===
- Fun with a Bloodroot (1967) 2 min 20 sec, 8 mm color
- The Happy Organ (1971) 20 min, 16 mm black and white
- Little Johnny (1972) 40 sec, 16 mm black and white
- 1/2 of a Telephone Conversation (1973) 2 min, 16 mm black and white
- Late Morning Start (1975) 28 min, 16 mm color
- The Discipline of DE (1978) 9 min, 16 mm black and white, adaptation of William S. Burroughs' short story, narrated by Ken Shapiro
- Alice in Hollywood (1981) 45 min, 16 mm color
- My Friend (1982) 3 min, 16 mm black and white
- Where'd She Go? (1983) 3 min, 16 mm color
- Nightmare Typhoon (1984) 9 min, 16 mm black and white
- My New Friend (1984) 3 min, 16 mm color
- Ken Death Gets Out of Jail (1985) 3 min, 16 mm black and white
- Five Ways to Kill Yourself (1986) 3 min, 16 mm black and white
- Thanksgiving Prayer (1991) 2 min, 35 mm color, written by and starring William S. Burroughs
- Four Boys on the Road in a Volvo (1996) 4min, color
- Jokes (2000) segment “Easter”, 30 min, MiniDV, written by Harmony Korine (Unreleased)
- Paris, je t'aime (2006) segment "Le Marais"
- To Each His Own Cinema (2007) segment "First Kiss" (3 min)
- 8 (2008) segment "Mansion on the Hill"

=== Feature film ===
Year	Title	Director	Writer	Producer	Editor
1985	Mala Noche	Yes	Yes	Yes	Uncredited
1989	Drugstore Cowboy	Yes	Yes	No	No
1991	My Own Private Idaho	Yes	Yes	No	No
1993	Even Cowgirls Get the Blues	Yes	Yes	Yes	Yes
1995	To Die For	Yes	No	No	No
1997	Good Will Hunting	Yes	No	No	No
1998	Psycho	Yes	No	Yes	No
2000	Finding Forrester	Yes	No	No	No
2002	Gerry	Yes	Yes	No	Yes
2003	Elephant	Yes	Yes	No	Yes
2005	Last Days	Yes	Yes	Yes	Yes
2007	Paranoid Park	Yes	Yes	No	Yes
2008	Milk	Yes	No	No	No
2011	Restless	Yes	No	Yes	No
2012	Promised Land	Yes	No	No	No
2015	The Sea of Trees	Yes	No	No	No
2018	Don't Worry, He Won't Get Far on Foot	Yes	Yes	No	Yes
2025	Dead Man's Wire	Yes	No	No	No

Executive producer only

- Kids (1995)
- Speedway Junky (1999)
- Tarnation (2003)
- Wild Tigers I Have Known (2006)
- Lightfield's Home Videos (2006)
- Howl (2010)
- Virginia (2010)
- Act Up! (2012)
- Laurence Anyways (2012)
- Revolution (2013)
- I Am Michael (2015)
- Age Out (2018)

Acting roles

Year	Title	Role
2001	Jay and Silent Bob Strike Back	Himself
2013	The Canyons	Dr. Campbell
2024	The Trainer	Himself

=== Television ===
Year	Title	Director	Executive Producer	Notes
2011	Boss	Yes	Yes	Episode "Listen"
2015	The Devil You Know	Yes	Yes	Episode "Pilot"
2017	When We Rise	Yes	Yes	Episode "Part 1"
2024	Feud: Capote vs. The Swans	Yes	Yes	6 episodes

Acting roles

Year	Title	Role	Episode
2008	Entourage	Himself	"Return to Queens Blvd."
2014	Portlandia		2 episodes

=== Music video ===
Year	Title	Artist
1990	"Thanksgiving Prayer"	William Burroughs
1990	"Fame '90"	David Bowie
1991	"I'm Seventeen"	Tommy Conwell & The Young Rumblers
1992	"Under the Bridge"	Red Hot Chili Peppers
1992	"Bang Bang Bang"	Tracy Chapman
1992	"Runaway"	Deee-Lite
1992	"The Last Song"	Elton John
1993	"San Francisco Days"	Chris Isaak
1993	"Just Keep Me Moving"	k.d. lang
1993	"Creep" (alternative version)	Stone Temple Pilots
1995	"Understanding"	Candlebox
1996	"Ballad of the Skeletons"	Allen Ginsberg with Paul McCartney, Philip Glass, Lenny Kaye et al.
1998	"Weird"	Hanson
2005	"Who Did You Think I Was" (turntable version)	John Mayer Trio
2007	"Desecration Smile"	Red Hot Chili Peppers
2016	"Ain't it Funny"	Danny Brown

== Accolades ==
Van Sant became one of only two filmmakers—the other being Joel Coen—to win both the Palme d'Or and Best Director accolades at the Cannes Film Festival in the same year.

Year	Association	Category	Nominated work	Result	Ref.
1986	Berlin International Film Festival	Best Short Film	Five Ways to Kill Yourself	Won	
1987	Los Angeles Film Critics Association	Experimental Film Award	Mala Noche	Won	
1989	Berlin International Film Festival	CICAE Award	Drugstore Cowboy	Won	
1989	Independent Spirit Awards	Best Director	Drugstore Cowboy	Nominated	
1989	Independent Spirit Awards	Best Screenplay	Drugstore Cowboy	Won	
1989	Los Angeles Film Critics Association	Best Screenplay	Drugstore Cowboy	Won	
1989	National Society of Film Critics	Best Director	Drugstore Cowboy	Won	
1989	National Society of Film Critics	Best Screenplay	Drugstore Cowboy	Won	
1989	New York Film Critics' Circle	Best Screenplay	Drugstore Cowboy	Won	
1991	Independent Spirit Awards	Best Director	My Own Private Idaho	Nominated	
1991	Independent Spirit Awards	Best Screenplay	My Own Private Idaho	Won	
1991	New York Film Critics' Circle	Best Director	My Own Private Idaho	Nominated	
1991	Venice International Film Festival	Golden Lion	My Own Private Idaho	Nominated	
1993	Venice International Film Festival	Golden Lion	Even Cowgirls Get the Blues	Nominated	
1997	Academy Awards	Best Director	Good Will Hunting	Nominated	
1997	Berlin International Film Festival	Golden Berlin Bear	Good Will Hunting	Nominated	
1997	Directors Guild of America Awards	Best Director	Good Will Hunting	Nominated	
2000	Berlin International Film Festival	Golden Berlin Bear	Finding Forrester	Nominated	
2000	Berlin International Film Festival	German Art House Guild Prize	Finding Forrester	Won	
2002	Independent Spirit Awards	Best Director	Gerry	Nominated	
2003	Cannes Film Festival	Palme d'Or	Elephant	Won	
2003	Cannes Film Festival	Best Director	Elephant	Won	
2003	Cannes Film Festival	Cinema Prize of the French National Education System	Elephant	Won	
2003	César Awards	Best Foreign Film	Elephant	Nominated	
2003	Independent Spirit Awards	Best Director	Elephant	Nominated	
2005	Cannes Film Festival	Palme d'Or	Last Days	Nominated	
2006	Cannes Film Festival	Un Certain Regard	Paris, Je T'aime	Nominated	
2007	Cannes Film Festival	Palme d'Or	Paranoid Park	Nominated	
2007	Independent Spirit Awards	Best Director	Paranoid Park	Nominated	
2008	Academy Award	Best Director	Milk	Nominated	
2008	Berlin International Film Festival	Best Feature Film	Milk	Nominated	
2008	César Awards	Best Foreign Film	Milk	Nominated	
2008	Critics' Choice Movie Awards	Best Director	Milk	Nominated	
2008	Directors Guild of America Awards	Best Director - Motion Picture	Milk	Nominated	
2011	Cannes Film Festival	Un Certain Regard	Restless	Nominated	
2013	Berlin International Film Festival	Golden Berlin Bear	Promised Land	Nominated	
2013	Berlin International Film Festival	International Jury Mention	Promised Land	Won	
2015	Cannes Film Festival	Palme d'Or	The Sea of Trees	Nominated	
2018	Berlin International Film Festival	Golden Berlin Bear	Don't Worry, He Won't Get Far on Foot	Nominated	
2018	Berlin International Film Festival	Best Feature Film	Don't Worry, He Won't Get Far on Foot	Nominated	
2024	Primetime Emmy Award	Outstanding Directing for a Limited Series or Movie	Feud: Capote vs. The Swans	Nominated	
2025	Venice International Film Festival	Campari Passion for Film Award	—N/a	Honored	

Directed Academy Award performances
Under Van Sant's direction, these actors have received Academy Award wins and nominations for their performances in their respective roles.

Year	Performer	Film	Result
Academy Award for Best Actor
1998	Matt Damon	Good Will Hunting	Nominated
2009	Sean Penn	Milk	Won
Academy Award for Best Supporting Actor
1998	Robin Williams	Good Will Hunting	Won
2009	Josh Brolin	Milk	Nominated
Academy Award for Best Supporting Actress
1998	Minnie Driver	Good Will Hunting	Nominated

== Discography ==
- The Elvis of Letters (1985) with William S. Burroughs
- Millions of Images (1990) with William S. Burroughs
- 18 Songs About Golf (1998)

== See also ==
- List of LGBTQ Academy Award winners and nominees
- List of LGBTQ people from Portland, Oregon
- List of people from the Louisville metropolitan area
- List of Rhode Island School of Design people
