= Love Decade =

English electronic music group

- Also known as: Decadance
- Origin: Manchester, England
- Genres: Electronic
- Years active: 1991–1996
- Label: All Around the World Productions
- Past members: Peter Gill; Chris O'Brien; Dave Shaw; Rob Van Winkelen; Jerome Stokes

Love Decade, a.k.a. Decadance, was an English electronic music group that was formed in 1991 by producer Peter Gill, who did the production and writing on the singles that were released during its brief career. Among its members in this project were vocalist Jerome Stokes, who later recorded with N-Trance as their lead vocalist, MC Chris O'Brien, and dancers Dave Shaw and Rob Van Winkelen.

The song "So Real", on which Jerome Stokes sang lead vocals, is the group's highest charting single on the UK Singles Chart, peaking at number 14. It earned the act a performance on Top of the Pops in 1991, where Stokes sang live. The act's second single, and its only video for, "I Feel You", featured the vocals of up-and-coming artist named Abigail, who was credited on the single as Gail.

== Singles ==
List of singles, with selected chart positions
Title	Year	Chart positions	
Title	Year	UK	AUS
"Dream On (Is This a Dream)"	1991	52	
"So Real"	1991	14	121
"I Feel You" (featuring Gail)	1992	34	175
"When the Morning Comes"	1992	69	
"Is This a Dream '96"	1996	39	219
