= If I Were You (k.d. lang song) =

1995 single by k.d. lang

Single by k.d. lang

from the album All You Can Eat
- B-side: "Get Some"
- Released: 18 September 1995
- Studio: Placebo Sound, Placebow Sound (Vancouver, British Columbia)
- Length: 3:58
- Label: Warner Bros.
- Songwriters: k.d. lang, Ben Mink
- Producers: k.d. lang, Ben Mink

K.d. lang singles chronology
"Lifted by Love" (1994)	"If I Were You" (1995)	"You're OK" (1996)

Music video
- "If I Were You" on YouTube

"If I Were You" is a song written by Canadian songwriters k.d. lang and Ben Mink and performed by lang. It was the first single released from lang's third studio album, All You Can Eat (1995), by Warner Bros. on 18 September 1995. The single reached number 24 on the Canadian RPM 100 Hit Tracks chart and number four on the RPM Adult Contemporary chart. On the US Billboard charts, the single reached number 15 on the Bubbling Under Hot 100 and was lang's second and final number one on the Dance Club Play chart. Overseas, "If I Were You" peaked at number 23 in Australia, number 50 in New Zealand, and number 53 in the United Kingdom. In 2017, Billboard ranked "If I Were You" as lang's sixth-best song.

== Critical reception ==
In his review of All You Can Eat, Steve Baltin from Cash Box wrote, "The disc kicks off with the erudite 'If I Were You', a song that more adventurous radio programmers will find friendly." Dave Jennings from Melody Maker felt "she's got one of the most gorgeous and achingly sensual voices currently being committed to audio tape". He added, "'If I Were You' is, I guess, probably best described as an affectionate envy song; kd wishing that it was possible for her to be a less contentious figure, so that she could get more done. Is Madonna possibly clutching burning ears at this moment?" Sylvia Patterson from NME noted its "wafty harp and moodsome reverie". Another NME editor, Angela Lewis, commented, "As ever, the stretch-limousine smooth Lang voice puts one in mind of chintzy cocktail parties where 'close' pals like Cindy Crawford, David Geffen and Madonna turn up, on the spur of the moment, like."

== Track listings ==
- US 7-inch and CD single
1. "If I Were You" – 3:38
2. "Get Some" – 3:37
- US 12-inch single

A1. "If I Were You" (main mix) – 6:11
A2. "If I Were You" (Junior's X-Beat mix) – 7:28
A3. "Get Some" – 3:37
B1. "If I Were You" (Junior's X-Beat Miss Queen dub) – 9:27
B2. "If I Were You" (main mix dub) – 11:04

- US maxi-CD single
1. "If I Were You" (album edit) – 3:38
2. "If I Were You" (Smokin' Lounge mix) – 4:10
3. "If I Were You" (main mix) – 5:59
4. "If I Were You" (Junior's X-Beat mix) – 7:28
5. "Get Some" – 3:37
- UK, Australian, and Japanese CD single
1. "If I Were You" – 3:58
2. "Get Some" – 3:37
3. "What's New Pussycat" (live) – 2:44
- UK cassette single
1. "If I Were You" – 3:58
2. "What's New Pussycat" (live) – 2:44
- Australian maxi-CD single
1. "If I Were You" (album version)
2. "If I Were You" (Close to the Groove edit)
3. "If I Were You" (Smokin' Lounge mix)
4. "If I Were You" (Junior's X-Beat mix)
5. "If I Were You" (album edit)
6. "What's New Pussycat" (live)

== Credits and personnel ==
Credits are lifted from the All You Can Eat album booklet.

Studios

- Recorded at Placebo Sound and Placebow Sound (Vancouver, British Columbia)
- Mixed at Encore Studios (Burbank, California)
- Mastered at Gateway Mastering (Portland, Maine, US)

Personnel

- k.d. lang – writing, banjo, harp, production, additional recording
- Ben Mink – writing, guitars, production, additional recording
- David Piltch – bass guitar
- Teddy Borowiecki – Rhodes, additional keyboards
- Randall Stoll – drums
- Graham Boyle – percussion
- Marc Ramaer – co-production, recording, mixing
- Jason Mauza – recording engineering
- Jason Mauza – mix engineering
- Bob Ludwig – mastering

== Charts ==
=== Weekly charts ===
Chart (1995–1996)	Peak position
Australia (ARIA)	23
Canada Top Singles (RPM)	24
Canada Adult Contemporary (RPM)	4
New Zealand (Recorded Music NZ)	50
Scottish Singles Sales (Official Charts)	43
UK Singles (Official Charts)	53
US Bubbling Under Hot 100 (Billboard)	15
US Dance Club Songs (Billboard)	1
US Dance Singles Sales (Billboard)	15

=== Year-end charts ===
Chart (1995)	Position
Canada Adult Contemporary (RPM)	46

Chart (1996)	Position
US Dance Club Play (Billboard)	31

== Release history ==
Region	Date	Format(s)	Label(s)	Ref.
United Kingdom	18 September 1995	CD; cassette	Warner Bros.	
Australia	23 October 1995	CD; cassette	Warner Bros.; Sire	
Japan	25 October 1995	CD	Warner Bros.; Sire	
United States	21 November 1995	Rhythmic contemporary; contemporary hit radio	Warner Bros.	
Australia	4 December 1995	Maxi-CD	Warner Bros.; Sire	

== See also ==
- List of number-one dance singles of 1996 (U.S.)
