= Constant Craving =

1992 single by k.d. lang

Single by k.d. lang

from the album Ingénue
- B-side: "Season of Hollow Soul" (1992); "Miss Chatelaine" (live) (1993)
- Released: 27 April 1992
- Genre: Pop
- Length: 4:38
- Label: Sire; Warner Bros.
- Songwriters: k.d. lang; Ben Mink
- Producers: Greg Penny; Ben Mink; k.d. lang

K.d. lang singles chronology
"Barefoot" (1991)	"Constant Craving" (1992)	"Miss Chatelaine" (1992)

Music video
- "Constant Craving" on YouTube

"Constant Craving" is a song written by Canadian singer-songwriter k.d. lang and Ben Mink, performed by lang and included on her second solo album, Ingénue (1992). The song was released in the United Kingdom in April 1992, by Sire and Warner Records, and won lang a Grammy Award in the category for Best Female Pop Vocal Performance in 1993, as well as an MTV Video Music Award for Best Female Video. The accompanying music video was directed by Mark Romanek.

"Constant Craving" peaked at number eight on Canada's RPM 100 Hit Tracks chart, and numbers 29 and 38 on the US Cash Box Top 100 and Billboard Hot 100 charts, giving lang her only US top-40 hit. It also reached number two on the Billboard Hot Adult Contemporary Tracks chart. In the United Kingdom, the song was a modest hit when released in 1992, but following a reissue in 1993 in the wake of its American success, it reached a new peak of number 15 on the UK Singles Chart.

== Song information ==
English rock band the Rolling Stones used a refrain very similar to that of "Constant Craving" in their 1997 single "Anybody Seen My Baby?" They later gave writing credits on that song to k.d. lang and Mink, shared with the original authors Mick Jagger and Keith Richards.

== Critical reception ==
John T. Davis from Austin American Statesman complimented "Constant Craving" as "a song graced by a compelling melody and a vocal brimming with yearning." Larry Flick from Billboard magazine stated, "There is no denying the rootsy, down-home quality of this wonderfully produced tune. Lang's distinctive voice is woven into spiraling multitracked harmonies, wafting over a base of acoustic guitar strumming and subtle accordian [sic] and xylophone interludes." Steve Morse from Boston Globe named it the best song of the album, declaring it as "a romantic number that's also the only rhythmic tune of the bunch." Clark and DeVaney from Cash Box named it Pick of the Week and a "standout" of the album. A reviewer from Daily Mirror described it as "haunting". Rufer and Fell from the Gavin Report commented, "k.d.'s forsaken country for a straight pop format that will finally win her the mass audience she's deserved. This track showcases her wonderful voice in solo and multi-part harmonies."

Pan-European magazine Music & Media described it as "a Brecht/Weil on the prairie type of song—is likely to be lang's first hit in the UK and in Ireland". On the album review, a Music & Media editor wrote, "Tales from the new west. La lang has changed her position on horseback for a more comfortable seat on the coach. In mind, she's singing in some Paris café in the decadent '20s." John Milward from Rolling Stone felt the song is "more elusive", "but there's no denying the lift of its propulsive rhythms and joyful harmonies." David Bauder from The Salt Lake Tribune praised "Constant Craving" as one of lang's best songs, remarking that it "concludes that a sense of longing is an inevitable part of life."

== Retrospective response ==
Mark Deming from AllMusic felt that the "emotional core" of songs like "Constant Craving", "was obvious even when their surfaces were evasive." In 2008, the Daily Vault's Jason Warburg viewed it as a "dynamite single", that "manages to meld the spiritual with the physical while conveying a feverish desire for both kinds of fulfillment." He also remarked its "upbeat", "expansive and full of simmering appeal". In 2019 and 2025, Billboard magazine included "Constant Craving" in its lists of the "30 Lesbian Love Songs" and "100 Greatest LGBTQ+ Anthems of All Time".

== Music video ==
The accompanying music video for "Constant Craving" was directed by American filmmaker and photographer Mark Romanek and filmed in black-and-white. It presents a fanciful recreation of the premiere of Samuel Beckett's play Waiting for Godot in Paris, 1953. Here, she is depicted singing backstage while the actors perform. The director says the song's lyrics of desperation and waiting fit well with the themes of Beckett's play. American basic cable television network VH1 added the video to its playlist in mid-April 1992. The clip won Best Female Video at the 1993 MTV Video Music Awards.

== Track listings ==
=== 1992 release ===
- US 7-inch and cassette single

A. "Constant Craving" (album version) – 4:38
B. "Season of Hollow Soul" (album version) – 4:56

- UK 12-inch and CD single
1. "Constant Craving" (edit)
2. "Barefoot" (rhythmic version)
3. "Season of Hollow Soul"
- UK 7-inch and cassette single
1. "Constant Craving" (edit)
2. "Barefoot" (rhythmic version)
- European CD single
1. "Constant Craving" (radio edit) – 3:45
2. "Constant Craving" (album version) – 4:38
3. "Tears of Love's Recall" – 3:48

=== 1993 release ===
- UK 7-inch and cassette single
1. "Constant Craving" (edit) – 3:45
2. "Miss Chatelaine" (live) – 4:28
- UK CD1 and Australian CD single
1. "Constant Craving" (edit) – 3:45
2. "Wash Me Clean" (live) – 3:28
3. "The Mind of Love" (live) – 3:17
- UK CD2
1. "Constant Craving" (live) – 4:18
2. "Miss Chatelaine" (live) – 4:28
3. "Big Boned Gal" (live) – 3:47
4. "Outside Myself" (live) – 5:03

== Charts ==
=== Weekly charts ===
Weekly chart performance for "Constant Craving"
Chart (1992–1993)	Peak position
Australia (ARIA)	38
Canada Contemporary Hit Radio (The Record)	18
Canada Top Singles (RPM)	8
Canada Adult Contemporary (RPM)	2
Europe (Eurochart Hot 100)	46
Europe (European Hit Radio)	36
Germany (GfK)	61
Iceland (Íslenski Listinn Topp 40)	27
Ireland (IRMA)	15
Israel (Israeli Singles Chart)	17
UK Singles (Official Charts)	52
UK Singles (Official Charts) 1993 re-release	15
UK Airplay (Music Week)	2
US Billboard Hot 100	38
US Adult Contemporary (Billboard)	2
US Pop Airplay (Billboard)	22
US Cash Box Top 100	29

=== Year-end charts ===
Year-end chart performance for "Constant Craving"
Chart (1992)	Position
Canada Top Singles (RPM)	54
Canada Adult Contemporary (RPM)	13
US Adult Contemporary (Billboard)	24

== Release history ==
Release dates and formats for "Constant Craving"
Region	Date	Format(s)	Label(s)	Ref.
United Kingdom	27 April 1992	7-inch vinyl; 12-inch vinyl; CD; cassette	Sire; Warner Bros.	
United Kingdom (re-release)	15 February 1993	7-inch vinyl; CD; cassette	Sire; Warner Bros.	
Australia	7 March 1993	CD	Sire; Warner Bros.	

== Abigail version ==
"Constant Craving"

Single by Abigail

from the album Feel Good
- B-side: "Don't Tell Me Why"
- Released: 1993
- Genre: Hi-NRG
- Length: 4:06 (radio version)
- Label: Klone
- Songwriters: k.d. lang; Ben Mink

Abigail singles chronology
"Could It Be Magic" (1992)	"Constant Craving" (1993)	"Losing My Religion" (1993)

"Constant Craving '95"

Single by Abigail

from the album Feel Good
- B-side: "What Goes Around Comes Around"
- Released: 1995
- Genre: Hi-NRG
- Length: 4:04 (radio edit)
- Label: ZYX Music
- Songwriters: k.d. lang; Ben Mink

Abigail singles chronology
"Don't You Wanna Know" (1994)	"Constant Craving '95" (1995)	"Night Moves On" (1996)

English singer Abigail covered the song on her 1994 debut album, Feel Good. It was first released as a single in 1993 on Klone Records. A 1995 release titled "Constant Craving '95" featuring new mixes of the song was released on the ZYX label.

=== Track listings ===
- 12-inch vinyl single (Klone Records – 1993)
1. "Constant Craving" (vocal version)
2. "Constant Craving" (instrumental)
3. "Don't Tell Me Why" (vocal version)
4. "Don't Tell Me Why" (instrumental)
- CD maxi-single (Klone Records – 1993)
1. "Constant Craving" (radio version) – 4:06
2. "Constant Craving" (original mix) – 6:24
3. "Constant Craving" (Trade mix) – 9:34
4. "Don't Tell Me Why" – 4:50
- 12-inch vinyl single - "Constant Craving '95" (ZYX Music – 1995)
1. "Constant Craving '95" (Illusive mix) – 8:01
2. "Constant Craving '95" (Gailforce mix) – 8:01
3. "Constant Craving '95" (original mix)
4. "What Goes Around Comes Around" (Ace mix) – 6:03
- CD maxi-single (ZYX Music – 1995)
1. "Constant Craving '95" (radio edit) – 4:04
2. "Constant Craving '95" (Illusive mix) – 8:01
3. "Constant Craving '95" (Gailforce mix) – 8:01
4. "What Goes Around Comes Around" (Ace mix) – 6:03

== Other versions ==
- Montreal-based electropunk band Lesbians on Ecstasy reworked the song as "Kündstant Krøving" on their 2004 album Lesbians on Ecstasy.
- Charlotte Martin has also recorded a cover of the song on her album Reproductions.
- In 2011, the song was featured in the Glee episode "I Kissed a Girl" with vocals by Naya Rivera, Idina Menzel and Chris Colfer.
- Her Chariot Awaits covered the song on their 2020 self-titled album.
