= Michael R. Fine =

American computer scientist

Michael R. Fine (born November 29, 1966) is a beta testing consultant, author, and inventor. He is the author of "Beta Testing for Better Software" (Wiley, 2002), and is a founder of and currently a senior test manager at Centercode, a beta testing software and services company. Fine is actively engaged in the promotion of beta testing as a concept, speaking on the topic, teaching courses, and authoring several articles on it.

Fine conducted beta tests on the first Palm handheld devices, as well as the original Bluetooth designs, and was significantly involved in the launch of xDSL and WiFi. He was also actively engaged in the testing of new modem standards, starting with V.32 up through V.92. Prior to helping found Centercode, Fine was the beta test manager for Megahertz, USRobotics, and ultimately, 3Com Corporation. He was responsible for managing the beta testing of 3Com's networking and communications products for three of their global divisions.

In addition to technical writing for Iomega and several magazine articles, Fine is the author of three books:

- Beta Testing for Better Software (ISBN 0471250376)
- Utah: The Complete Ski and Snowboard Guide (ISBN 0881507423)
- Canoeing and Kayaking Utah (ISBN 0881507032)

Fine contributed to U.S. Patent 6215799 for an ISDN analog interface, and U.S. Patent 6275933 for a security design.

Fine's experience in quality assurance, beta testing, alpha testing, and delta testing has him teaching courses on these subjects for LinkedIn Learning.

Fine graduated from Loyola Academy in 1984, then Weber State University in 1989, and currently serves as a member of its Alumni Association Board. Fine is a member of the Pi Kappa Alpha national fraternity.
