= DMA (magazine) =

- September 1999 cover of DMA, featuring singer Taylor Dayne.
- Publisher: Gary Hayslett
- Founder: Gary Hayslett
- First issue: 1993; 33 years ago
- Final issue: April 2003
- Country: United States
- Based in: Tinley Park, Illinois, U.S.
- Language: English
- Website: dmaclub.com

DMA (Dance Music Authority) was a monthly American dance music publication that ran from 1993 to 2003. It originally ceased publishing due to a downturn in advertising revenue.

== Background ==
DMA was based in Tinley Park, Illinois, and covered the dance music scene, with articles, interviews and profiles of artists, DJs and remixers, as well as in-depth record reviews, spotlights on clubs, dance music gear and equipment, and commentary on the genre in general.

Like most independently owned publications, DMA thrived on the support of record labels and advertisers, most of them coming from the dance music industry and from die-hard fans of the genre. But, by 2001, DMA's days were numbered as several labels and advertisers began to either scale back or to fold completely. The continuing effects resulted in Hayslett's decision to cease publication in spring 2003.

Today, Dance Music Authority continues online at DMAclub.com and is powered by WordPress, where it has become an online-community.
