= Ingénue (album) =

Studio album by k.d. lang
- Released: March 17, 1992
- Studios: Vancouver Studios, Vancouver, British Columbia, Canada
- Genres: Pop; country; folk; jazz
- Length: 41:47
- Labels: Sire; Warner Bros.
- Producers: Greg Penny; Ben Mink; k.d. lang

k.d. lang chronology
Absolute Torch and Twang (1989)	Ingénue (1992)	All You Can Eat (1995)

Singles from Ingénue
- 1. "Constant Craving" Released: April 27, 1992 (UK); 2. "Miss Chatelaine" Released: 1992; 3. "The Mind of Love" Released: 1993

Ingénue is the second solo album by Canadian singer k.d. lang, released in 1992. It is Lang's most successful album on the pop charts, both in her native Canada and internationally, and has more of a cabaret flavor than her earlier more country-influenced work.

According to Ben Mink, her producer and collaborator, German artist Marlene Dietrich was a "huge vocal influence" for lang at that time. This admiration extended to the visual realm: the cover art for Ingénue is considered a direct homage to the cover of The Essential Marlene Dietrich. Both share a sepia color palette and the use of a similar thin-lined font. The primary pose of lang on the cover, gazing downward, also directly echoes Dietrich's pose on her album. Mink even characterized the sound of Ingénue as a "post-nuclear cabaret," a description that resonates with the aesthetic associated with Dietrich's repertoire.

== Singles ==
"Constant Craving" was the first single released from the album. It peaked at number 8 in Lang's native Canada, number 38 on the US Billboard Hot 100 and number 15 in the UK Singles Chart when re-released, becoming her biggest solo hit single there. "Constant Craving" inspired (albeit subconsciously) The Rolling Stones' 1997 single "Anybody Seen My Baby?", from their Bridges to Babylon album, with the result that the Stones gave writing credits on that song to lang and her collaborator Ben Mink.

"Miss Chatelaine" was released as the second single from the album. The song's video depicted Lang—who was usually best known for a fairly androgynous appearance—in an exaggeratedly feminine manner, surrounded by bright pastel colours and a profusion of bubbles reminiscent of a performance on The Lawrence Welk Show, complete with an accordion in the instrumentation.

A third single, "The Mind of Love", was also released.

Both "Save Me" and "Still Thrives This Love" were used in the 2003 Showtime film Soldier's Girl.

== Critical reception ==
Professional ratings
Review scores
Source	Rating
AllMusic	4/5 stars
Chicago Tribune	2.5/4 stars
Entertainment Weekly	C
Los Angeles Times	3/4 stars
Mojo	5/5 stars
NME	9/10
Pitchfork	9.0/10
Q	4/5 stars
Rolling Stone	4/5 stars
Uncut	9/10

Ingénue was included in the book 1001 Albums You Must Hear Before You Die.

== Track listing ==
All songs written by k.d. lang and Ben Mink, except where noted.

1. "Save Me" – 4:33
2. "The Mind of Love" – 3:48
3. "Miss Chatelaine" – 3:49
4. "Wash Me Clean" (Lang) – 3:17
5. "So It Shall Be" (Lang, Greg Penny) – 4:30
6. "Still Thrives This Love" – 3:35
7. "Season of Hollow Soul" – 4:58
8. "Outside Myself" – 4:57
9. "Tears of Love's Recall" – 3:49
10. "Constant Craving" – 4:37

== Personnel ==
- k.d. lang – vocals, electric and acoustic guitars, mandolin, tamboura, tambourine, percussion, Tma
- Ben Mink – electric and acoustic guitars, bass, viola, violin, percussion, beatboxing
- Greg Penny – percussion, beatboxing
- Greg Leisz – steel, pedal steel and lap steel guitar
- Teddy Borowiecki – keyboards, piano, accordion, santur
- David Piltch – acoustic, electric and fretless bass guitar
- Randall Stoll – drums
- Graham Boyle – percussion, tympani, tambourine
- Gary Burton – marimba, vibraphone
- Ingrid Friesen, Martin Laba – pizzicato violin
- John Friesen – cello
- Myron Schultz – clarinet

=== Production ===
- Producers: Greg Penny, Ben Mink, k.d. lang
- Engineers: Greg Penny, Marc Ramaer, Morrie Eaman, Ben Mink
- Assistant engineers: Steve Royea, Louie Teran, Pete Wonsiak
- Mixing: Greg Penny, Marc Ramaer
- Mixing assistant: Chris Puram
- Mastering: Chris Bellman
- Programming: Ben Mink, Greg Penny
- String arrangements: Ben Mink
- Art direction: Jeri Heiden
- Design: Jeri Heiden, Greg Ross
- Photography: Glen Erler

== Accolades ==
=== Grammy Awards ===
Year	Nominee / work	Award	Result
1993	Ingénue	Album of the Year	Nominated
1993	Ingénue	Best Engineered Non-classical Album	Nominated
1993	"Constant Craving"	Best Female Pop Vocal Performance	Won
1993	"Constant Craving"	Song of the Year	Nominated
1993	"Constant Craving"	Record of the Year	Nominated
1994	"Miss Chatelaine"	Best Female Pop Vocal Performance	Nominated

== Charts ==
=== Weekly charts ===
Chart (1992–94)	Peak position
Australian Albums (ARIA)	3
Canadian Albums (RPM)	13
German Albums (Offizielle Top 100)	91
Japanese Albums (Oricon)	64
New Zealand Albums (RMNZ)	1
UK Albums (Official Charts)	3
US Billboard 200	18

=== Year-end charts ===
Chart (1993)	Position
UK Albums (OCC)	57
US Billboard 200	95
Chart (1994)	Position
Australian Albums (ARIA)	30
New Zealand Albums (RMNZ)	17

== Certifications ==
Region	Certification	Certified units/sales
Australia (ARIA)	2× Platinum	140,000^{^}
Canada (Music Canada)	2× Platinum	200,000^{^}
New Zealand (RMNZ)	Platinum	15,000^{^}
United Kingdom (BPI)	Platinum	300,000^{^}
United States (RIAA)	2× Platinum	2,000,000^{^}
^{^} Shipments figures based on certification alone.
