= Mala Noche =

- Theatrical release poster
- Directed by: Gus Van Sant
- Screenplay by: Gus Van Sant
- Based on: Mala Noche: And Other "Illegal" Adventures; 1977 story by Walt Curtis
- Produced by: Gus Van Sant
- Starring: Tim Streeter; Doug Cooeyate; Ray Monge; Nyla McCarthy
- Cinematography: John Campbell
- Edited by: Gus Van Sant
- Music by: Creighton Lindsay
- Release date: May 4, 1988 (United States)
- Running time: 78 minutes
- Country: United States
- Languages: English; Spanish
- Budget: $25,000

Mala Noche (also known as Bad Night) is a 1986 American drama film directed by Gus Van Sant in his directorial film debut and based on Walt Curtis' semi-autobiographical novel. The film stars Tim Streeter, Doug Cooeyate, Ray Monge, and Nyla McCarthy. It was shot on 16 mm in black-and-white in Portland, Oregon.

== Plot ==
The story follows relationship between Walt, a gay store clerk, and two younger Mexican boys, Johnny and Roberto Pepper. Walt and his female friend convince them to come over for dinner, but Johnny and Pepper have to return to their cheap hotel because another friend is locked out. Walt makes his first pass at Johnny by offering him $15 to sleep with him. Johnny refuses and runs to his hotel room, leaving Roberto locked out with nowhere to spend the night but Walt's. Settling for second best, Walt lies down next to Pepper and allows him on top for sex. However, he does not give up on trying to win over Johnny. The film progresses from there into not always clearly defined relationships, unbalanced by age, language, money, race, and sex.

Roberto falls ill with a fever and Walt nurses him back to health. Later, while Walt is away one day, police infiltrate the apartment building. Roberto, who has obtained a gun, confronts them and is shot to death. A mournful Walt finds his body.

Johnny soon returns, having been caught and deported back to the border, then crossing the Rio Grande and returning within two weeks. He and Walt drink tequila and he tells in his story, but when Walt breaks the news of Roberto's death, Johnny calls him a liar and angrily storms out after carving a homophobic slur into the door of Walt's apartment.

Walt spots Johnny hanging out on the street again as he drives by with a friend, and invites him to come visit him any time. Johnny doesn't respond, but looks back as Walt drives away.

== Cast ==
- Tim Streeter as Walt Curtis

Curtis himself appears as George

- Doug Cooeyate as Johnny
- Ray Monge as Roberto Pepper
- Nyla McCarthy as Betty
- Don Chambers as himself

== Reception ==
Rotten Tomatoes gives the film a rating of 96% from 25 reviews with the consensus: "Mala Noche is a raw and gritty portrait of desire, doomed romance, and rejection -- and marks debuting director Gus Van Sant as a filmmaker with a gratifyingly personal touch."

== Home media ==
The film was released on DVD as part of the Criterion Collection on October 9, 2007.
