= Night Moves On =

Single by Abigail Zsiga

from the album Feel Good
- Released: 1996
- Recorded: 1995
- Genre: Breakbeat
- Length: 3:33
- Label: Pulse 8
- Songwriters: Nigel Swanston, Tim Cox
- Producer: Band of Gypsies

"Night Moves On" is a song by English electronic/pop singer Abigail Zsiga, taken from her album Feel Good. The song was produced by Nigel Swanston and Tim Cox, collectively known as the Band of Gypsies.

== Track listing ==
1. "Night Moves On" (radio edit) - 3:33
2. "Night Moves On" (Stone & Nice radio edit) - 3:54
3. "Night Moves On" (Rhythm Masters' Trip Hip dub) - 8:43
4. "Night Moves On" (Stone & Nice club mix) - 7:15
5. "Night Moves On" (Band of Gypsies full on vocal mix) - 5:38
6. "Night Moves On" (Band of Gypsies orchestral mix) - 7:06

== Personnel ==
- Abigail Zsiga - vocals
- Nigel Swanston - production, songwriting, all instrument programming
- Tim Cox - production, songwriting, engineering, mixing

== Charts ==
Chart	Peak position
U.S. Dance Club Songs (Billboard)	36
