= Walt Curtis =

American poet (1941–2023)

Walt Curtis (July 4, 1941 – August 25, 2023) was an American poet, novelist, and painter from Portland, Oregon. His autobiographical work, Mala Noche (1977), became the basis for Gus Van Sant's 1985 film of the same name. He was the co-founder of the Oregon Cultural Heritage Commission. He hosted the poetry radio show "Talking Earth" at KBOO from 1971. He wrote about and championed Oregon literary figures such as Joaquin Miller, Hazel Hall, Frances Fuller Victor, and many others. He also acted in Property in 1978 and Paydirt in 1981.

Portland Mayor Sam Adams declared July 1–7, 2010 "Walt Curtis Week." Curtis died on August 25, 2023, at the age of 82.

== Books ==
- Angel Pussy (1970)
- The Erotic Flying Machine (1970)
- The Sunflower and Other Earth Poems (1975)
- The Mad Bombers Notebook (1975)
- The Mad Poems, The Unreasonable Ones (1975)
- The Roses of Portland (1974, poetry)
- Mala Noche (1977)
- Peckerneck Country (1978)
- Journey Across America (1979)
- Rhymes for Alice Bluelight (1984)
- Salmon Song, And Other Wet Poems (1995)
- Mala Noche: And Other "Illegal" Adventures (1997)

== Films ==
- Penny Allen: Property (1978)
- Penny Allen: Paydirt (1981)
- Gus van Sant: Mala Noche (1985) as George
- Bill Plympton and Walt Curtis: Walt Curtis, The Peckerneck Poet (1997)
- Sabrina Guitart: Salmon Poet (2009)
- Courtney Fathom Sell: An Afternoon with Walt Curtis (2010)
