= Be Still My Soul (Abigail album) =

Studio album by Abigail
- Released: 2010
- Genre: Adult contemporary
- Length: 0:42:37
- Label: Water Lily Music, LLC

Be Still My Soul is an album by Abigail.

The album is a collection of hymns that Abigail enjoys.

"This album is different from anything I have ever done before. It is a departure from my previous styles of music but I haven't abandoned my club roots, and I'm still going to do a follow up to 'Home...again'. This is a snapshot of where I am right now. It has been a healing, cathartic experience for me."

Be Still My Soul is a collection of hymns, including "Amazing Grace", "How Great Thou Art" and "Be Still My Soul".

Abigail stated: "My hope for this collection of songs is to reach right into the heart of the listener and connect you to whatever that greater power is in your life. I wish for it to bring great comfort, healing, joy and peace."

== Track listings ==
1. It Is Well With My Soul
2. How Great Thou Art
3. Take My Life and Let It Be
4. Be Still My Soul
5. Great Is Thy Faithfulness
6. Amazing Grace
7. Come Thou Fount Of Every Blessing
8. Be Thou My Vision
9. This Is My Father's World
10. Abide With Me
