= Just Keep Me Moving =

1993 single performed by k.d. lang

Single by k.d. lang

from the album Even Cowgirls Get the Blues soundtrack
- B-side: "In Perfect Dreams"
- Released: 29 November 1993
- Studio: Pearl Sound
- Genre: Deep house
- Length: 4:08 (radio remix); 3:58 (remix/album version)
- Label: Warner Bros.; Sire
- Songwriters: Ben Mink; k.d. lang
- Producers: Ben Mink; k.d. lang

K.d. lang singles chronology
| "Miss Chatelaine" (1993) | "Just Keep Me Moving" (1993) | "Lifted by Love" (1994) |

Music video
- "Just Keep Me Moving" on YouTube

"Just Keep Me Moving" is a song by Canadian singer-songwriter k.d. lang, co-written with Ben Mink. It was featured in the 1993 film Even Cowgirls Get the Blues, starring Uma Thurman, as well as the soundtrack album. The single was released in November 1993, by Warner Bros. and Sire Records, and reached number six on the US Billboard Hot Dance Club Play chart and number seven on the Canadian RPM Adult Contemporary chart. In Europe, it peaked at number 59 on the UK Singles Chart, but was more successful on the Music Week Airplay and Dance Singles charts, peaking at numbers 26 and 35. A music video was also produced to promote the single.

== Critical reception ==
Larry Flick from Billboard magazine wrote, "Betcha thought it would never happen. Torch diva lang slips into an intense deep-house groove with a lot more ease than you might expect. Redressing of a disco-minded cut from the Even Cowgirls Get the Blues soundtrack is an essential peak-hour entry, thanks to hearty bottom and moody keyboards. Radio may dig the equally jammin' hip-hop remixes. Gag on it, kiddies." Ben Thompson from The Independent stated, "Her swooning and, well, langorous vocal performances on songs such as 'Lifted by Love' and 'Just Keep Me Moving' are the perfect complement to the film's mood of dreamy sensuality, and also stand up well on their own." Pan-European magazine Music & Media remarked, "This funky single [...] is a gigantic departure from her usual "torch and twang". Funky as hell, it should give dance divas the blues."

John Harris from NME said, "On 'Just Keep Me Moving' she does the hitch-hike along this swish Becker/Fagen type groove — the only real musical nod to the novel's time frame." Another NME editor, Barbara Ellen, viewed it as "a limp, reggae-ish cut". Sam Wood from Philadelphia Inquirer found that "she imbues the antiquated sound of a '70s bell-bottom thumper with genuine heart, as if she were getting her first big break headlining at the Love Boat's discotheque." Renée Christ from Spin described it as "a dancey patter track, with lang's vocals filling space like a Casio sample when she's singing the repetitive onomatopoetic lyrics."

== Track listings ==
- 7-inch single, Europe (1993)
1. "Just Keep Me Moving" (Radio Remix) — 4:08
2. "In Perfect Dreams" — 3:07
- 12-inch single, US (1993)
1. "Just Keep Me Moving" (Movin' Mix) — 6:41
2. "Just Keep Me Moving" (Movin' Dub) — 6:40
3. "Just Keep Me Moving" (Radio Remix) — 4:10
4. "Just Keep Me Moving" (Wild Planet Mix) — 6:15
5. "Just Keep Me Moving" (Wild Planet Instrumental) — 6:19
6. "In Perfect Dreams" (Album Version) — 3:09
- CD single, Europe (1993)
1. "Just Keep Me Moving" (Radio Remix) — 4:08
2. "Just Keep Me Moving" (Movin' Mix) — 6:40
3. "Just Keep Me Moving" (Wild Planet Mix) — 6:15
4. "Just Keep Me Moving" (Movin' Dub) — 6:41
5. "Just Keep Me Moving" (Wild Planet Instrumental) — 6:15
6. "Just Keep Me Moving" (Album Version) — 4:42
- CD maxi, US (1993)
1. "Just Keep Me Moving" (Remix/Album Version) — 3:58
2. "Just Keep Me Moving" (Radio Remix) — 4:10
3. "Just Keep Me Moving" (Movin' Mix) — 6:41
4. "In Perfect Dreams" (Album Version) — 3:09
5. "Just Keep Me Moving" (Wild Planet Mix) — 6:15

== Charts ==
| Chart (1993–94) | Peak positions |
|---|---|
| Australia (ARIA) | 63 |
| Canada Top Singles (RPM) | 25 |
| Canada Adult Contemporary (RPM) | 7 |
| Europe (European Dance Radio) | 24 |
| Netherlands (Single Top 100 Tipparade) | 16 |
| UK Singles (Official Charts) | 59 |
| UK Airplay (Music Week) | 26 |
| UK Dance (Music Week) | 35 |
| UK Club Chart (Music Week) | 90 |
| US Dance Club Songs (Billboard) | 6 |
| US Maxi-Singles Sales (Billboard) | 22 |
