= List of songs recorded by Alice in Chains =

Alice in Chains is an American rock band formed in Seattle in 1987 by guitarist and vocalist Jerry Cantrell and drummer Sean Kinney, who then recruited bassist Mike Starr and original lead vocalist Layne Staley. Starr was replaced by Mike Inez in 1993. Although never officially disbanding, Alice in Chains was plagued by extended inactivity from 1996 onwards due to Staley's substance abuse, which resulted in his death in 2002. The band reunited in 2005 for a live benefit show and toured in 2006 with William DuVall taking over as lead vocalist full-time. The band has released three albums with DuVall sharing vocal duties with Cantrell.

Since its formation, Alice in Chains has released six studio albums, three EPs, three live albums, four compilations, and two DVDs. The band is known for its distinctive vocal style, which often included the harmonised vocals of Staley and Cantrell (and later Cantrell and William DuVall).

== Table ==
- The columns Title and Author list each song title and the writer(s) of each song, listed by last name only.
- The columns Recorded, Location, and Producer list the date that the song was recorded, the location of the studio or venue where the recording of the song took place, and the producer(s) of each song listed by last name.

Title	Author(s)	Release(s)	Recorded	Location(s)	Producer(s)	Time
A Little Bitter	Staley / Cantrell / Inez / Kinney	Last Action Hero: Music from the Original Motion Picture (June 8, 1993)			Alice in Chains	3:53
A Little Bitter (Remix)	Staley / Cantrell / Inez / Kinney	Music Bank (October 26, 1999)			Alice in Chains	3:52
A Little Bitter (Remix)	Staley / Cantrell / Inez / Kinney	The Essential Alice in Chains (September 5, 2006)			Alice in Chains	3:48
A Little Bitter	Staley / Cantrell / Inez / Kinney	Live (December 5, 2000)	July 3, 1996	The Kemper Arena, Kansas City, MO		3:52
All I Am	Cantrell	Rainier Fog (August 24, 2018)	June 12, 2017 – January 12, 2018	Studio X, Seattle / Rock Falcon Studio, Nashville / Jerry Cantrell's home studio, Los Angeles / Henson Recording Studios, Los Angeles	Raskulinecz	7:15
A Looking in View	Cantrell / DuVall / Kinney / Inez	Black Gives Way to Blue (September 29, 2009)	October 23, 2008 – March 18, 2009	Studio 606, Northridge, CA / Henson Recording Studios, Los Angeles	Raskulinecz / Alice in Chains	7:06
Acid Bubble	Cantrell	Black Gives Way to Blue (September 29, 2009)	October 23, 2008 – March 18, 2009	Studio 606, Northridge, CA / Henson Recording Studios, Los Angeles	Raskulinecz / Alice in Chains	6:55
Again	Staley / Cantrell	Alice in Chains (November 7, 1995)	April–August 1995	Bad Animals Studio, Seattle	Wright / Alice in Chains	4:05
Again	Staley / Cantrell	Nothing Safe: Best of the Box (June 29, 1999)	April–August 1995	Bad Animals Studio, Seattle	Wright / Alice in Chains	4:04
Again	Staley / Cantrell	Greatest Hits (July 24, 2001)	April–August 1995	Bad Animals Studio, Seattle	Wright / Alice in Chains	4:05
Again	Staley / Cantrell	The Essential Alice in Chains (September 5, 2006)	April–August 1995	Bad Animals Studio, Seattle	Wright / Alice in Chains	4:05
Again (Jungle Mix)	Staley / Cantrell	Alice in Chains Japanese bonus track (November 7, 1995)	April–August 1995	Bad Animals Studio, Seattle	Wright / Alice in Chains	4:08
Again (Tattoo of Pain Mix)	Staley / Cantrell	Alice in Chains Japanese bonus track (November 7, 1995)	April–August 1995	Bad Animals Studio, Seattle	Wright / Alice in Chains	4:03
Again (Tattoo of Pain Mix)	Staley / Cantrell	Music Bank (October 26, 1999)	April–August 1995	Bad Animals Studio, Seattle	Wright / Alice in Chains	4:02
Again	Staley / Cantrell	Live (December 5, 2000)	July 2, 1996	Kiel Center, St. Louis, MO		2:39
All Secrets Known	Cantrell	Black Gives Way to Blue (September 29, 2009)	October 23, 2008 – March 18, 2009	Studio 606, Northridge, CA / Henson Recording Studios, Los Angeles	Raskulinecz / Alice in Chains	4:42
Am I Inside	Cantrell / Staley	Sap (February 4, 1992)	November 1991	London Bridge Studio, Seattle (Features guest vocals by Ann Wilson)	Alice in Chains / Parashar	5:09
Am I Inside	Cantrell / Staley	Music Bank (October 26, 1999)	November 1991	London Bridge Studio, Seattle (Features guest vocals by Ann Wilson)	Alice in Chains / Parashar	5:08
Am I Inside	Cantrell / Staley	The Essential Alice in Chains (September 5, 2006)	November 1991	London Bridge Studio, Seattle (Features guest vocals by Ann Wilson)	Alice in Chains / Parashar	5:09
Angry Chair	Staley	Dirt (September 29, 1992)	March–May 1992	One on One Recording Studios, Los Angeles / Eldorado Recording Studios, Burbank, CA	Jerden / Alice in Chains	4:48
Angry Chair	Staley	Nothing Safe: Best of the Box (June 29, 1999)	March–May 1992	One on One Recording Studios, Los Angeles / Eldorado Recording Studios, Burbank, CA	Jerden / Alice in Chains	4:46
Angry Chair	Staley	Music Bank (October 26, 1999)	March–May 1992	One on One Recording Studios, Los Angeles / Eldorado Recording Studios, Burbank, CA	Jerden / Alice in Chains	4:47
Angry Chair	Staley	Greatest Hits (July 24, 2001)	March–May 1992	One on One Recording Studios, Los Angeles / Eldorado Recording Studios, Burbank, CA	Jerden / Alice in Chains	4:48
Angry Chair	Staley	The Essential Alice in Chains (September 5, 2006)	March–May 1992	One on One Recording Studios, Los Angeles / Eldorado Recording Studios, Burbank, CA	Jerden / Alice in Chains	4:49
Angry Chair	Staley	Unplugged CD (July 30, 1996)	10 April 1996	Majestic Theatre, Brooklyn Academy of Music, Brooklyn (Song cut from the MTV broadcast)	Wright / Alice in Chains	4:36
Angry Chair	Staley	Unplugged DVD (October 8, 1996)	10 April 1996	Majestic Theatre, Brooklyn Academy of Music, Brooklyn (Song cut from the MTV broadcast)	Coletti	4:36
Angry Chair	Staley	Live (December 5, 2000)	March 2, 1993	Barrowland Ballroom, Glasgow, Scotland	Wilson	4:22
Black Gives Way to Blue	Cantrell	Black Gives Way to Blue (September 29, 2009)	October 23, 2008 – March 18, 2009	Studio 606, Northridge, CA / Henson Recording Studios, Los Angeles	Raskulinecz / Alice in Chains	3:03
Black Gives Way to Blue (Piano Mix)	Cantrell	Black Gives Way to Blue iTunes bonus track (September 29, 2009)				3:01
Bleed the Freak	Cantrell	Facelift (August 21, 1990)	December 1989–April 1990	London Bridge Studio, Seattle / Capitol Recording Studio, Hollywood	Jerden	4:01
Bleed the Freak	Cantrell	Music Bank (October 26, 1999)	1988		Alice in Chains / Parashar	4:22
Bleed the Freak	Cantrell	Live (December 5, 2000)	December 22, 1990	Moore Theatre, Seattle		3:32
Breath on a Window	Cantrell	The Devil Put Dinosaurs Here (May 28, 2013)	July 2011–December 2012	Henson Recording Studios, Los Angeles	Raskulinecz / Alice in Chains	5:18
Brother	Cantrell	Sap (February 4, 1992) (Features guest vocals by Ann Wilson)	November 1991	London Bridge Studio, Seattle	Alice in Chains / Parashar	4:27
Brother	Cantrell	Music Bank (October 26, 1999)	November 1991	London Bridge Studio, Seattle	Alice in Chains / Parashar	4:27
Brother	Cantrell	The Essential Alice in Chains (September 5, 2006)	November 1991	London Bridge Studio, Seattle	Alice in Chains / Parashar	4:29
Brother	Cantrell	Unplugged CD (July 30, 1996)	10 April 1996	Majestic Theatre, Brooklyn Academy of Music, Brooklyn	Wright / Alice in Chains	5:27
Brother	Cantrell	Unplugged DVD (October 8, 1996)	10 April 1996	Majestic Theatre, Brooklyn Academy of Music, Brooklyn	Coletti	5:27
Brush Away	Staley / Cantrell / Kinney / Inez	Alice in Chains (November 7, 1995)	April–August 1995	Bad Animals Studio, Seattle	Wright / Alice in Chains	3:22
Check My Brain	Cantrell	Black Gives Way to Blue (September 29, 2009)	October 23, 2008 – March 18, 2009	Studio 606, Northridge, CA / Henson Recording Studios, Los Angeles	Raskulinecz / Alice in Chains	3:57
Choke	Cantrell / Inez / Kinney	The Devil Put Dinosaurs Here (May 28, 2013)	July 2011–December 2012	Henson Recording Studios, Los Angeles	Raskulinecz / Alice in Chains	5:44
Confusion	Cantrell / Starr / Staley	Facelift (August 21, 1990)	December 1989–April 1990	London Bridge Studio, Seattle / Capitol Recording Studio, Hollywood	Jerden	5:44
Confusion	Cantrell / Starr / Staley	Music Bank (October 26, 1999)	December 1989–April 1990	London Bridge Studio, Seattle / Capitol Recording Studio, Hollywood	Jerden	5:44
Dam That River	Cantrell	Dirt (September 29, 1992)	March–May 1992	One on One Recording Studios, Los Angeles / Eldorado Recording Studios, Burbank, CA	Jerden / Alice in Chains	3:09
Dam That River	Cantrell	Music Bank (October 26, 1999)	March–May 1992	One on One Recording Studios, Los Angeles / Eldorado Recording Studios, Burbank, CA	Jerden / Alice in Chains	3:09
Dam That River	Cantrell	The Essential Alice in Chains (September 5, 2006)	March–May 1992	One on One Recording Studios, Los Angeles / Eldorado Recording Studios, Burbank, CA	Jerden / Alice in Chains	3:11
Dam That River	Cantrell	Live (December 5, 2000)	July 3, 1996	The Kemper Arena, Kansas City, MO		3:33
Deaf Ears Blind Eyes	Cantrell	Rainier Fog (August 24, 2018)	June 12, 2017 – January 12, 2018	Studio X, Seattle / Rock Falcon Studio, Nashville / Jerry Cantrell's home studio, Los Angeles / Henson Recording Studios, Los Angeles	Raskulinecz	4:44
Died	Staley / Cantrell	Music Bank (October 26, 1999)	September 1998		Jerden / Wright	5:58
Died	Staley / Cantrell	The Essential Alice in Chains (September 5, 2006)	September 1998		Jerden / Wright	5:58
Dirt	Cantrell / Staley	Dirt (September 29, 1992)	March–May 1992	One on One Recording Studios, Los Angeles / Eldorado Recording Studios, Burbank, CA	Jerden / Alice in Chains	5:16
Dirt	Cantrell / Staley	Music Bank (October 26, 1999)	March–May 1992	One on One Recording Studios, Los Angeles / Eldorado Recording Studios, Burbank, CA	Jerden / Alice in Chains	5:17
Dirt	Cantrell / Staley	The Essential Alice in Chains (September 5, 2006)	March–May 1992	One on One Recording Studios, Los Angeles / Eldorado Recording Studios, Burbank, CA	Jerden / Alice in Chains	5:17
Dirt (Drunk And Disorderly Version)	Cantrell / Staley	Live (December 5, 2000)	October 24, 1993	Nagoya, Japan	Naficy	5:24
Don't Follow	Cantrell	Jar of Flies (January 25, 1994)	September 7–14, 1993	London Bridge Studio, Seattle	Alice in Chains	4:22
Down in a Hole	Cantrell	Dirt (September 29, 1992)	March–May 1992	One on One Recording Studios, Los Angeles / Eldorado Recording Studios, Burbank, CA	Jerden / Alice in Chains	5:38
Down in a Hole	Cantrell	Nothing Safe: Best of the Box (June 29, 1999)	March–May 1992	One on One Recording Studios, Los Angeles / Eldorado Recording Studios, Burbank, CA	Jerden / Alice in Chains	5:37
Down in a Hole	Cantrell	Music Bank (October 26, 1999)	March–May 1992	One on One Recording Studios, Los Angeles / Eldorado Recording Studios, Burbank, CA	Jerden / Alice in Chains	5:38
Down in a Hole	Cantrell	Black Gives Way to Blue Japanese bonus track (September 29, 2009)	2009	Ricardo Montalbán Theatre		6:46
Drone	Cantrell	Rainier Fog (August 24, 2018)	June 12, 2017 – January 12, 2018	Studio X, Seattle / Rock Falcon Studio, Nashville / Jerry Cantrell's home studio, Los Angeles / Henson Recording Studios, Los Angeles	Raskulinecz	6:30
Fear the Voices	Starr / Cantrell / Staley	Music Bank (October 26, 1999)	March–May 1992		Jerden / Alice in Chains	4:58
Fly	Cantrell / Kinney	Rainier Fog (August 24, 2018)	June 12, 2017 – January 12, 2018	Studio X, Seattle / Rock Falcon Studio, Nashville / Jerry Cantrell's home studio, Los Angeles / Henson Recording Studios, Los Angeles	Raskulinecz	5:18
Frogs	Staley / Cantrell / Kinney / Inez	Alice in Chains (November 7, 1995)	April–August 1995	Bad Animals Studio, Seattle	Wright / Alice in Chains	8:18
Frogs	Staley / Cantrell / Kinney / Inez	Music Bank (October 26, 1999)	April–August 1995	Bad Animals Studio, Seattle	Wright / Alice in Chains	8:17
Frogs	Staley / Cantrell / Kinney / Inez	Unplugged CD (July 30, 1996)	10 April 1996	Majestic Theatre, Brooklyn Academy of Music, Brooklyn (Song cut from the MTV broadcast)	Wright / Alice in Chains	7:30
Frogs	Staley / Cantrell / Kinney / Inez	Unplugged DVD (October 8, 1996)	10 April 1996	Majestic Theatre, Brooklyn Academy of Music, Brooklyn (Song cut from the MTV broadcast)	Coletti	7:30
Get Born Again	Staley / Cantrell	Nothing Safe: Best of the Box (June 29, 1999)	October 1998		Wright / Jerden	5:26
Get Born Again	Staley / Cantrell	Music Bank (October 26, 1999)	October 1998		Wright / Jerden	5:24
Get Born Again	Staley / Cantrell	The Essential Alice in Chains (September 5, 2006)	October 1998		Wright / Jerden	5:25
God Am	Staley / Cantrell / Kinney / Inez	Alice in Chains (November 7, 1995)	April–August 1995	Bad Animals Studio, Seattle	Wright / Alice in Chains	4:08
God Am	Staley / Cantrell / Kinney / Inez	Music Bank (October 26, 1999)	April–August 1995	Bad Animals Studio, Seattle	Wright / Alice in Chains	4:07
God Am	Staley / Cantrell / Kinney / Inez	Live (December 5, 2000)	July 2, 1996	Kiel Center, St. Louis		3:59
God Smack	Cantrell / Staley	Dirt (September 29, 1992)	March–May 1992	One on One Recording Studios, Los Angeles / Eldorado Recording Studios, Burbank, CA	Jerden / Alice in Chains	3:56
God Smack	Cantrell / Staley	Music Bank (October 26, 1999)	March–May 1992	One on One Recording Studios, Los Angeles / Eldorado Recording Studios, Burbank, CA	Jerden / Alice in Chains	3:51
God Smack	Cantrell / Staley	The Essential Alice in Chains (September 5, 2006)	March–May 1992	One on One Recording Studios, Los Angeles / Eldorado Recording Studios, Burbank, CA	Jerden / Alice in Chains	3:51
Got Me Wrong	Cantrell	Sap (February 4, 1992)	November 1991	London Bridge Studio, Seattle	Alice in Chains / Parashar	4:12
Got Me Wrong	Cantrell	Clerks: Music from the Motion Picture (October 11, 1994)	November 1991	London Bridge Studio, Seattle	Alice in Chains / Parashar	4:09
Got Me Wrong	Cantrell	Music Bank (October 26, 1999)	November 1991	London Bridge Studio, Seattle	Alice in Chains / Parashar	4:10
Got Me Wrong	Cantrell	The Essential Alice in Chains (September 5, 2006)	November 1991	London Bridge Studio, Seattle	Alice in Chains / Parashar	4:12
Got Me Wrong	Cantrell	Unplugged CD (July 30, 1996)	10 April 1996	Majestic Theatre, Brooklyn Academy of Music, Brooklyn	Wright / Alice in Chains	4:59
Got Me Wrong	Cantrell	Unplugged DVD (October 8, 1996)	10 April 1996	Majestic Theatre, Brooklyn Academy of Music, Brooklyn	Coletti	4:59
Got Me Wrong	Cantrell	Nothing Safe: Best of the Box (June 29, 1999)	10 April 1996	Majestic Theatre, Brooklyn Academy of Music, Brooklyn	Wright / Alice in Chains	4:24
Grind	Cantrell	Alice in Chains (November 7, 1995)	April–August 1995	Bad Animals Studio, Seattle	Wright / Alice in Chains	4:44
Grind	Cantrell	Nothing Safe: Best of the Box (June 29, 1999)	April–August 1995	Bad Animals Studio, Seattle	Wright / Alice in Chains	4:44
Grind	Cantrell	Music Bank (October 26, 1999)	April–August 1995	Bad Animals Studio, Seattle	Wright / Alice in Chains	4:45
Grind	Cantrell	Greatest Hits (July 24, 2001)	April–August 1995	Bad Animals Studio, Seattle	Wright / Alice in Chains	4:46
Grind	Cantrell	The Essential Alice in Chains (September 5, 2006)	April–August 1995	Bad Animals Studio, Seattle	Wright / Alice in Chains	4:46
Hate to Feel	Staley	Dirt (September 29, 1992)	March–May 1992	One on One Recording Studios, Los Angeles / Eldorado Recording Studios, Burbank, CA	Jerden / Alice in Chains	5:15
Hate to Feel	Staley	Music Bank (October 26, 1999)	March–May 1992	One on One Recording Studios, Los Angeles / Eldorado Recording Studios, Burbank, CA	Jerden / Alice in Chains	5:16
Hate to Feel	Staley	The Essential Alice in Chains (September 5, 2006)	March–May 1992	One on One Recording Studios, Los Angeles / Eldorado Recording Studios, Burbank, CA	Jerden / Alice in Chains	5:17
Head Creeps	Staley	Alice in Chains (November 7, 1995)	April–August 1995	Bad Animals Studio, Seattle	Wright / Alice in Chains	6:28
Head Creeps	Staley	Music Bank (October 26, 1999)	April–August 1995	Bad Animals Studio, Seattle	Wright / Alice in Chains	6:27
Heaven Beside You	Cantrell / Inez	Alice in Chains (November 7, 1995)	April–August 1995	Bad Animals Studio, Seattle	Wright / Alice in Chains	5:27
Heaven Beside You	Cantrell / Inez	Music Bank (October 26, 1999)	April–August 1995	Bad Animals Studio, Seattle	Wright / Alice in Chains	5:29
Heaven Beside You	Cantrell / Inez	Greatest Hits (July 24, 2001)	April–August 1995	Bad Animals Studio, Seattle	Wright / Alice in Chains	5:29
Heaven Beside You	Cantrell / Inez	The Essential Alice in Chains (September 5, 2006)	April–August 1995	Bad Animals Studio, Seattle	Wright / Alice in Chains	5:30
Heaven Beside You	Cantrell / Inez	Unplugged CD (July 30, 1996)	10 April 1996	Majestic Theatre, Brooklyn Academy of Music, Brooklyn	Wright / Alice in Chains	5:38
Heaven Beside You	Cantrell / Inez	Unplugged DVD (October 8, 1996)	10 April 1996	Majestic Theatre, Brooklyn Academy of Music, Brooklyn	Coletti	5:38
Hollow	Cantrell	The Devil Put Dinosaurs Here (May 28, 2013)	July 2011–December 2012	Henson Recording Studios, Los Angeles	Raskulinecz / Alice in Chains	5:43
Hung On A Hook	Cantrell	The Devil Put Dinosaurs Here (May 28, 2013)	July 2011–December 2012	Henson Recording Studios, Los Angeles	Raskulinecz / Alice in Chains	5:34
I Can't Have You Blues	Cantrell	Music Bank (October 26, 1999)	1988		Alice in Chains / Parashar	4:01
I Can't Remember	Cantrell / Staley	Facelift (August 21, 1990)	December 1989–April 1990	London Bridge Studio, Seattle / Capitol Recording Studio, Hollywood	Jerden	3:42
I Can't Remember	Cantrell / Staley	Music Bank (October 26, 1999)	December 1989–April 1990	London Bridge Studio, Seattle / Capitol Recording Studio, Hollywood	Jerden	3:43
I Know Somethin (Bout You)	Cantrell	Facelift (August 21, 1990)	December 1989–April 1990	London Bridge Studio, Seattle / Capitol Recording Studio, Hollywood	Jerden	4:22
I Stay Away	Staley / Inez / Cantrell	Jar of Flies (January 25, 1994)	7–14 September 1993	London Bridge Studio, Seattle	Alice in Chains	4:14
I Stay Away	Staley / Inez / Cantrell	Nothing Safe: Best of the Box (June 29, 1999)	7–14 September 1993	London Bridge Studio, Seattle	Alice in Chains	4:14
I Stay Away	Staley / Inez / Cantrell	Music Bank (October 26, 1999)	7–14 September 1993	London Bridge Studio, Seattle	Alice in Chains	4:14
I Stay Away	Staley / Inez / Cantrell	Greatest Hits (July 24, 2001)	7–14 September 1993	London Bridge Studio, Seattle	Alice in Chains	4:14
I Stay Away	Staley / Inez / Cantrell	The Essential Alice in Chains (September 5, 2006)	7–14 September 1993	London Bridge Studio, Seattle	Alice in Chains	4:14
Iron Gland	Cantrell	Dirt unlisted track (September 29, 1992)	March–May 1992	One on One Recording Studios, Los Angeles / Eldorado Recording Studios, Burbank, CA (Features guest vocals from Tom Araya)	Jerden / Alice in Chains	0:43
Iron Gland	Cantrell	Nothing Safe: Best of the Box (June 29, 1999)	March–May 1992	One on One Recording Studios, Los Angeles / Eldorado Recording Studios, Burbank, CA (Features guest vocals from Tom Araya)	Jerden / Alice in Chains	0:43
Iron Gland	Cantrell	Music Bank (October 26, 1999)	March–May 1992	One on One Recording Studios, Los Angeles / Eldorado Recording Studios, Burbank, CA (Features guest vocals from Tom Araya)	Jerden / Alice in Chains	0:43
It Ain't Like That	Cantrell / Starr / Kinney	We Die Young (July 1990)	December 1989–April 1990	London Bridge Studio, Seattle / Capitol Recording Studio, Hollywood	Jerden	4:38
It Ain't Like That	Cantrell / Starr / Kinney	Facelift (August 21, 1990)	December 1989–April 1990	London Bridge Studio, Seattle / Capitol Recording Studio, Hollywood	Jerden	4:37
It Ain't Like That	Cantrell / Starr / Kinney	Music Bank (October 26, 1999)	December 1989–April 1990	London Bridge Studio, Seattle / Capitol Recording Studio, Hollywood	Jerden	4:38
Junkhead	Cantrell / Staley	Dirt (September 29, 1992)	March–May 1992	One on One Recording Studios, Los Angeles / Eldorado Recording Studios, Burbank, CA	Jerden / Alice in Chains	5:09
Junkhead	Cantrell / Staley	Live (December 5, 2000)	March 2, 1993	Barrowland Ballroom, Glasgow, Scotland	Wilson	5:21
Junkhead	Cantrell / Staley	Music Bank (October 26, 1999)	1992		Alice in Chains / Parashar	5:11
Killer Is Me	Cantrell	Unplugged CD (July 30, 1996)	10 April 1996	Majestic Theatre, Brooklyn Academy of Music, Brooklyn (Song cut from the MTV broadcast)	Wright / Alice in Chains	5:23
The Killer Is Me	Cantrell	Unplugged DVD (October 8, 1996)	10 April 1996	Majestic Theatre, Brooklyn Academy of Music, Brooklyn (Song cut from the MTV broadcast)	Coletti	5:23
The Killer Is Me	Cantrell	Music Bank (October 26, 1999)	10 April 1996	Majestic Theatre, Brooklyn Academy of Music, Brooklyn (Song cut from the MTV broadcast)	Wright / Alice in Chains	5:18
Killing Yourself	Cantrell / Staley	We Die Young (July 1990)	December 1989–April 1990	London Bridge Studio, Seattle / Capitol Recording Studio, Hollywood	Jerden	2:38
Killing Yourself	Cantrell / Staley	Music Bank (October 26, 1999)	1988		Alice in Chains / Parashar	4:22
Lab Monkey	Cantrell	The Devil Put Dinosaurs Here (May 28, 2013)	July 2011–December 2012	Henson Recording Studios, Los Angeles	Raskulinecz / Alice in Chains	5:59
Last of My Kind	Cantrell / DuVall	Black Gives Way to Blue (September 29, 2009)	October 23, 2008 – March 18, 2009	Studio 606, Northridge, CA / Henson Recording Studios, Los Angeles	Raskulinecz / Alice in Chains	5:52
Lesson Learned	Cantrell	Black Gives Way to Blue (September 29, 2009)	October 23, 2008 – March 18, 2009	Studio 606, Northridge, CA / Henson Recording Studios, Los Angeles	Raskulinecz / Alice in Chains	4:16
Love, Hate, Love	Cantrell / Staley	Facelift (August 21, 1990)	December 1989–April 1990	London Bridge Studio, Seattle / Capitol Recording Studio, Hollywood	Jerden	6:26
Love, Hate, Love	Cantrell / Staley	Music Bank (October 26, 1999)	December 1989–April 1990	London Bridge Studio, Seattle / Capitol Recording Studio, Hollywood	Jerden	6:26
Love, Hate, Love	Cantrell / Staley	The Essential Alice in Chains (September 5, 2006)	December 1989–April 1990	London Bridge Studio, Seattle / Capitol Recording Studio, Hollywood	Jerden	6:29
Love, Hate, Love	Cantrell / Staley	Live (December 5, 2000)	March 2, 1993	Barrowland Ballroom, Glasgow, Scotland	Wilson	7:47
Love Song	Kinney	Sap unlisted bonus track (February 4, 1992)	November 1991	London Bridge Studio, Seattle (Features guest vocals by Chris Cornell)	Alice in Chains / Parashar	3:44
Low Ceiling	Cantrell / Inez / Kinney	The Devil Put Dinosaurs Here (May 28, 2013)	July 2011–December 2012	Henson Recording Studios, Los Angeles	Raskulinecz / Alice in Chains	5:15
Lying Season	Staley / Cantrell	Music Bank (October 26, 1999)			Alice in Chains / Parashar	3:21
Man in the Box	Cantrell / Staley	Facelift (August 21, 1990)	December 1989–April 1990	London Bridge Studio, Seattle / Capitol Recording Studio, Hollywood	Jerden	4:46
Man in the Box	Cantrell / Staley	Nothing Safe: Best of the Box (June 29, 1999)	December 1989–April 1990	London Bridge Studio, Seattle / Capitol Recording Studio, Hollywood	Jerden	4:46
Man in the Box	Cantrell / Staley	Music Bank (October 26, 1999)	December 1989–April 1990	London Bridge Studio, Seattle / Capitol Recording Studio, Hollywood	Jerden	4:46
Man in the Box	Cantrell / Staley	Greatest Hits (July 24, 2001)	December 1989–April 1990	London Bridge Studio, Seattle / Capitol Recording Studio, Hollywood	Jerden	4:47
Man in the Box	Cantrell / Staley	The Essential Alice in Chains (September 5, 2006)	December 1989–April 1990	London Bridge Studio, Seattle / Capitol Recording Studio, Hollywood	Jerden	4:47
Man in the Box	Cantrell / Staley	Live (December 5, 2000)	March 2, 1993	Barrowland Ballroom, Glasgow, Scotland	Wilson	4:59
Maybe	Cantrell	Rainier Fog (August 24, 2018)	June 12, 2017 – January 12, 2018	Studio X, Seattle / Rock Falcon Studio, Nashville / Jerry Cantrell's home studio, Los Angeles / Henson Recording Studios, Los Angeles	Raskulinecz	5:36
Never Fade	Cantrell / DuVall	Rainier Fog (August 24, 2018)	June 12, 2017 – January 12, 2018	Studio X, Seattle / Rock Falcon Studio, Nashville / Jerry Cantrell's home studio, Los Angeles / Henson Recording Studios, Los Angeles	Raskulinecz	4:40
No Excuses	Cantrell	Jar of Flies (January 25, 1994)	7–14 September 1993	London Bridge Studio, Seattle	Alice in Chains	4:15
No Excuses	Cantrell	Nothing Safe: Best of the Box (June 29, 1999)	7–14 September 1993	London Bridge Studio, Seattle	Alice in Chains	4:15
No Excuses	Cantrell	Music Bank (October 26, 1999)	7–14 September 1993	London Bridge Studio, Seattle	Alice in Chains	4:14
No Excuses	Cantrell	Greatest Hits (July 24, 2001)	7–14 September 1993	London Bridge Studio, Seattle	Alice in Chains	4:15
No Excuses	Cantrell	The Essential Alice in Chains (September 5, 2006)	7–14 September 1993	London Bridge Studio, Seattle	Alice in Chains	4:16
No Excuses	Cantrell	Unplugged CD (July 30, 1996)	10 April 1996	Majestic Theatre, Brooklyn Academy of Music, Brooklyn	Wright / Alice in Chains	4:57
No Excuses	Cantrell	Unplugged DVD (October 8, 1996)	10 April 1996	Majestic Theatre, Brooklyn Academy of Music, Brooklyn	Coletti	4:57
Nothin' Song	Staley / Cantrell / Kinney	Alice in Chains (November 7, 1995)	April–August 1995	Bad Animals Studio, Seattle	Wright / Alice in Chains	5:40
Nutshell	Staley / Cantrell / Inez / Kinney	Jar of Flies (January 25, 1994)	September 7–14, 1993	London Bridge Studio, Seattle	Alice in Chains	4:19
Nutshell	Staley / Cantrell / Inez / Kinney	Unplugged CD (July 30, 1996)	10 April 1996	Majestic Theatre, Brooklyn Academy of Music, Brooklyn	Wright / Alice in Chains	4:58
Nutshell	Staley / Cantrell / Inez / Kinney	Unplugged DVD (October 8, 1996)	10 April 1996	Majestic Theatre, Brooklyn Academy of Music, Brooklyn	Coletti	4:58
Nutshell	Staley / Cantrell / Inez / Kinney	Music Bank (October 26, 1999)	10 April 1996	Majestic Theatre, Brooklyn Academy of Music, Brooklyn	Wright / Alice in Chains	4:29
Nutshell	Staley / Cantrell / Inez / Kinney	The Essential Alice in Chains (September 5, 2006)	10 April 1996	Majestic Theatre, Brooklyn Academy of Music, Brooklyn	Wright / Alice in Chains	4:32
Over Now	Cantrell / Kinney	Alice in Chains (November 7, 1995)	April–August 1995	Bad Animals Studio, Seattle (Contains an excerpt of "Good Night" by Ted Lewis)	Wright / Alice in Chains	7:03
Over Now	Cantrell / Kinney	Unplugged CD (July 30, 1996)	10 April 1996	Majestic Theatre, Brooklyn Academy of Music, Brooklyn	Wright / Alice in Chains	7:12
Over Now	Cantrell / Kinney	Unplugged DVD (October 8, 1996)	10 April 1996	Majestic Theatre, Brooklyn Academy of Music, Brooklyn	Coletti	7:12
Over Now	Cantrell / Kinney	Music Bank (October 26, 1999)	10 April 1996	Majestic Theatre, Brooklyn Academy of Music, Brooklyn	Wright / Alice in Chains	5:53
Over Now	Cantrell / Kinney	The Essential Alice in Chains (September 5, 2006)	10 April 1996	Majestic Theatre, Brooklyn Academy of Music, Brooklyn	Wright / Alice in Chains	5:57
Phantom Limb	DuVall / Cantrell / Inez / Kinney	The Devil Put Dinosaurs Here (May 28, 2013)	July 2011–December 2012	Henson Recording Studios, Los Angeles	Raskulinecz / Alice in Chains	7:07
Pretty Done	Cantrell	The Devil Put Dinosaurs Here (May 28, 2013)	July 2011–December 2012	Henson Recording Studios, Los Angeles	Raskulinecz / Alice in Chains	3:35
Private Hell	Cantrell	Black Gives Way to Blue (September 29, 2009)	October 23, 2008 – March 18, 2009	Studio 606, Northridge, CA / Henson Recording Studios, Los Angeles	Raskulinecz / Alice in Chains	5:38
Put You Down	Cantrell	Facelift (August 21, 1990)	December 1989–April 1990	London Bridge Studio, Seattle / Capitol Recording Studio, Hollywood	Jerden	3:16
Queen of the Rodeo	Staley / Jett Silver	Music Bank (October 26, 1999)	5 November 1990	Dallas, TX	Naficy	4:39
Queen of the Rodeo	Staley / Jett Silver	Live (December 5, 2000)	5 November 1990	Dallas, TX	Naficy	4:39
Rain When I Die	Cantrell / Staley / Kinney / Starr	Dirt (September 29, 1992)	March–May 1992	One on One Recording Studios, Los Angeles / Eldorado Recording Studios, Burbank, CA	Jerden / Alice in Chains	6:01
Rain When I Die	Cantrell / Staley / Kinney / Starr	Music Bank (October 26, 1999)	March–May 1992	One on One Recording Studios, Los Angeles / Eldorado Recording Studios, Burbank, CA	Jerden / Alice in Chains	6:02
Rain When I Die	Cantrell / Staley / Kinney / Starr	The Essential Alice in Chains (September 5, 2006)	March–May 1992	One on One Recording Studios, Los Angeles / Eldorado Recording Studios, Burbank, CA	Jerden / Alice in Chains	6:03
Rainier Fog	Cantrell	Rainier Fog (August 24, 2018)	June 12, 2017 – January 12, 2018	Studio X, Seattle / Rock Falcon Studio, Nashville / Jerry Cantrell's home studio, Los Angeles / Henson Recording Studios, Los Angeles	Raskulinecz	5:01
Real Thing	Cantrell / Staley	Facelift (August 21, 1990)	December 1989–April 1990	London Bridge Studio, Seattle / Capitol Recording Studio, Hollywood	Jerden	4:03
Red Giant	Cantrell / Inez / Kinney	Rainier Fog (August 24, 2018)	June 12, 2017 – January 12, 2018	Studio X, Seattle / Rock Falcon Studio, Nashville / Jerry Cantrell's home studio, Los Angeles / Henson Recording Studios, Los Angeles	Raskulinecz	5:25
Right Turn	Cantrell	Sap (February 4, 1992)	November 1991	London Bridge Studio, Seattle; Performed by Alice Mudgarden (i.e., features guest vocals by Mark Arm and Chris Cornell)	Alice in Chains / Parashar	3:17
Right Turn	Cantrell	Music Bank (October 26, 1999)	November 1991	London Bridge Studio, Seattle; Performed by Alice Mudgarden (i.e., features guest vocals by Mark Arm and Chris Cornell)	Alice in Chains / Parashar	3:14
Right Turn	Cantrell	The Essential Alice in Chains (September 5, 2006)	November 1991	London Bridge Studio, Seattle; Performed by Alice Mudgarden (i.e., features guest vocals by Mark Arm and Chris Cornell)	Alice in Chains / Parashar	3:15
Rooster	Cantrell	Dirt (September 29, 1992)	March–May 1992	One on One Recording Studios, Los Angeles / Eldorado Recording Studios, Burbank, CA	Jerden / Alice in Chains	6:15
Rooster	Cantrell	Music Bank (October 26, 1999)	March–May 1992	One on One Recording Studios, Los Angeles / Eldorado Recording Studios, Burbank, CA	Jerden / Alice in Chains	6:14
Rooster	Cantrell	Greatest Hits (July 24, 2001)	March–May 1992	One on One Recording Studios, Los Angeles / Eldorado Recording Studios, Burbank, CA	Jerden / Alice in Chains	6:15
Rooster	Cantrell	The Essential Alice in Chains (September 5, 2006)	March–May 1992	One on One Recording Studios, Los Angeles / Eldorado Recording Studios, Burbank, CA	Jerden / Alice in Chains	6:15
Rooster	Cantrell	Unplugged CD (July 30, 1996)	10 April 1996	Majestic Theatre, Brooklyn Academy of Music, Brooklyn	Wright / Alice in Chains	6:41
Rooster	Cantrell	Unplugged DVD (October 8, 1996)	10 April 1996	Majestic Theatre, Brooklyn Academy of Music, Brooklyn	Coletti	6:41
Rooster	Cantrell	Nothing Safe: Best of the Box (June 29, 1999)	2 March 1993	Barrowland Ballroom, Glasgow, Scotland	Wilson	6:46
Rooster	Cantrell	Live (December 5, 2000)	2 March 1993	Barrowland Ballroom, Glasgow, Scotland	Wilson	4:22
Rooster	Cantrell	Music Bank (October 26, 1999)	1991			5:47
Rotten Apple	Staley / Inez / Cantrell	Jar of Flies (January 25, 1994)	September 7–14, 1993	London Bridge Studio, Seattle	Alice in Chains	6:58
Scalpel	Cantrell / Inez / Kinney	The Devil Put Dinosaurs Here (May 28, 2013)	July 2011–December 2012	Henson Recording Studios, Los Angeles	Raskulinecz / Alice in Chains	5:21
Sea of Sorrow	Cantrell	Facelift (August 21, 1990)	December 1989–April 1990	London Bridge Studio, Seattle / Capitol Recording Studio, Hollywood	Jerden	5:49
Sea of Sorrow	Cantrell	The Essential Alice in Chains (September 5, 2006)	December 1989–April 1990	London Bridge Studio, Seattle / Capitol Recording Studio, Hollywood	Jerden	5:51
Sea of Sorrow	Cantrell	Music Bank (October 26, 1999)	1988			5:20
Shame in You	Staley / Cantrell / Kinney / Inez	Alice in Chains (November 7, 1995)	April–August 1995	Bad Animals Studio, Seattle	Wright / Alice in Chains	5:35
Sickman	Cantrell / Staley	Dirt (September 29, 1992)	March–May 1992	One on One Recording Studios, Los Angeles / Eldorado Recording Studios, Burbank, CA	Jerden / Alice in Chains	5:29
Sickman	Cantrell / Staley	Music Bank (October 26, 1999)	March–May 1992	One on One Recording Studios, Los Angeles / Eldorado Recording Studios, Burbank, CA	Jerden / Alice in Chains	5:30
Sludge Factory	Staley / Cantrell / Kinney	Alice in Chains (November 7, 1995)	April–August 1995	Bad Animals Studio, Seattle	Wright / Alice in Chains	7:12
Sludge Factory	Staley / Cantrell / Kinney	Unplugged CD (July 30, 1996)	10 April 1996	Majestic Theatre, Brooklyn Academy of Music, Brooklyn (DVD's introduction to this song contains portions of "Enter Sandman" by Metallica)	Wright / Alice in Chains	4:36
Sludge Factory	Staley / Cantrell / Kinney	Unplugged DVD (October 8, 1996)	10 April 1996	Majestic Theatre, Brooklyn Academy of Music, Brooklyn (DVD's introduction to this song contains portions of "Enter Sandman" by Metallica)	Coletti	4:36
So Close	Staley / Cantrell / Kinney	Alice in Chains (November 7, 1995)	April–August 1995	Bad Animals Studio, Seattle	Wright / Alice in Chains	2:45
Social Parasite	Cantrell / Staley	Music Bank (October 26, 1999)	1988		Alice in Chains / Parashar	4:22
So Far Under	DuVall	Rainier Fog (August 24, 2018)	June 12, 2017 – January 12, 2018	Studio X, Seattle / Rock Falcon Studio, Nashville / Jerry Cantrell's home studio, Los Angeles / Henson Recording Studios, Los Angeles	Raskulinecz	4:33
Stone	Cantrell	The Devil Put Dinosaurs Here (May 28, 2013)	July 2011–December 2012	Henson Recording Studios, Los Angeles	Raskulinecz / Alice in Chains	4:23
Sunshine	Cantrell	Facelift (August 21, 1990)	December 1989–April 1990	London Bridge Studio, Seattle / Capitol Recording Studio, Hollywood	Jerden	4:44
Swing on This	Staley / Cantrell / Kinney / Inez	Jar of Flies (January 25, 1994)	September 7–14, 1993	London Bridge Studio, Seattle	Alice in Chains	4:22
Take Her Out	Cantrell	Black Gives Way to Blue (September 29, 2009)	October 23, 2008 – March 18, 2009	Studio 606, Northridge, CA / Henson Recording Studios, Los Angeles	Raskulinecz / Alice in Chains	4:00
Tears	Peart / Lee / Lifeson	Rush - 2112 [40th Anniversary Edition] (December 16, 2016)		Studio 606, Northridge, CA		4:20
Them Bones	Cantrell	Dirt (September 29, 1992)	March–May 1992	One on One Recording Studios, Los Angeles / Eldorado Recording Studios, Burbank, CA	Jerden / Alice in Chains	2:30
Them Bones	Cantrell	Nothing Safe: Best of the Box (June 29, 1999)	March–May 1992	One on One Recording Studios, Los Angeles / Eldorado Recording Studios, Burbank, CA	Jerden / Alice in Chains	2:30
Them Bones	Cantrell	Music Bank (October 26, 1999)	March–May 1992	One on One Recording Studios, Los Angeles / Eldorado Recording Studios, Burbank, CA	Jerden / Alice in Chains	2:29
Them Bones	Cantrell	Greatest Hits (July 24, 2001)	March–May 1992	One on One Recording Studios, Los Angeles / Eldorado Recording Studios, Burbank, CA	Jerden / Alice in Chains	2:30
Them Bones	Cantrell	The Essential Alice in Chains (September 5, 2006)	March–May 1992	One on One Recording Studios, Los Angeles / Eldorado Recording Studios, Burbank, CA	Jerden / Alice in Chains	2:31
Them Bones	Cantrell	Live (December 5, 2000)	July 2, 1996	Kiel Center, St. Louis		2:39
The Devil Put Dinosaurs Here	Cantrell / Inez / Kinney	The Devil Put Dinosaurs Here (May 28, 2013)	July 2011–December 2012	Henson Recording Studios, Los Angeles	Raskulinecz / Alice in Chains	6:38
The One You Know	Cantrell	Rainier Fog (August 24, 2018)	June 12, 2017 – January 12, 2018	Studio X, Seattle / Rock Falcon Studio, Nashville / Jerry Cantrell's home studio, Los Angeles / Henson Recording Studios, Los Angeles	Raskulinecz	4:49
Voices	Cantrell	The Devil Put Dinosaurs Here (May 28, 2013)	July 2011–December 2012	Henson Recording Studios, Los Angeles	Raskulinecz / Alice in Chains	5:42
We Die Young	Cantrell	We Die Young (July 1990)	December 1989–April 1990	London Bridge Studio, Seattle / Capitol Recording Studio, Hollywood	Jerden	2:31
We Die Young	Cantrell	Facelift (August 21, 1990)	December 1989–April 1990	London Bridge Studio, Seattle / Capitol Recording Studio, Hollywood	Jerden	2:32
We Die Young	Cantrell	Music Bank (October 26, 1999)	December 1989–April 1990	London Bridge Studio, Seattle / Capitol Recording Studio, Hollywood	Jerden	2:32
We Die Young	Cantrell	The Essential Alice in Chains (September 5, 2006)	December 1989–April 1990	London Bridge Studio, Seattle / Capitol Recording Studio, Hollywood	Jerden	2:33
We Die Young	Cantrell	Nothing Safe: Best of the Box (June 29, 1999)			Alice in Chains / Parashar	2:28
Whale & Wasp	Cantrell	Jar of Flies (January 25, 1994)	September 7–14, 1993	London Bridge Studio, Seattle	Alice in Chains	2:37
What The Hell Have I	Cantrell	Last Action Hero: Music from the Original Motion Picture (June 8, 1993)			Alice in Chains	3:58
What The Hell Have I	Cantrell	Nothing Safe: Best of the Box (June 29, 1999)			Alice in Chains	3:57
What The Hell Have I (Remix)	Cantrell	Music Bank (October 26, 1999)			Alice in Chains	3:57
What The Hell Have I (Remix)	Cantrell	The Essential Alice in Chains (September 5, 2006)			Alice in Chains	3:54
Whatcha Gonna Do	Cantrell / Staley	Music Bank (October 26, 1999)	1988		Alice in Chains / Parashar	2:54
Would?	Cantrell	Singles: Original Motion Picture Soundtrack (June 30, 1992)	March–May 1992	London Bridge Studio, Seattle	Alice in Chains / Parashar	3:27
Would?	Cantrell	Dirt (September 29, 1992)	March–May 1992	London Bridge Studio, Seattle	Alice in Chains / Parashar	3:28
Would?	Cantrell	Nothing Safe: Best of the Box (June 29, 1999)	March–May 1992	London Bridge Studio, Seattle	Alice in Chains / Parashar	3:28
Would?	Cantrell	Music Bank (October 26, 1999)	March–May 1992	London Bridge Studio, Seattle	Alice in Chains / Parashar	3:28
Would?	Cantrell	Greatest Hits (July 24, 2001)	March–May 1992	London Bridge Studio, Seattle	Alice in Chains / Parashar	3:28
Would?	Cantrell	The Essential Alice in Chains (September 5, 2006)	March–May 1992	London Bridge Studio, Seattle	Alice in Chains / Parashar	3:28
Would?	Cantrell	Unplugged CD (July 30, 1996)	10 April 1996	Majestic Theatre, Brooklyn Academy of Music, Brooklyn	Wright / Alice in Chains	3:43
Would?	Cantrell	Unplugged DVD (October 8, 1996)	10 April 1996	Majestic Theatre, Brooklyn Academy of Music, Brooklyn	Coletti	3:43
Would?	Cantrell	Live (December 5, 2000)	March 2, 1993	Barrowland Ballroom, Glasgow, Scotland	Wilson	3:51
Your Decision	Cantrell	Black Gives Way to Blue (September 29, 2009)	October 23, 2008 – March 18, 2009	Studio 606, Northridge, CA / Henson Recording Studios, Los Angeles	Raskulinecz / Alice in Chains	4:43
Your Decision	Cantrell	Black Gives Way to Blue iTunes bonus track (September 29, 2009)				4:48

== See also ==
- Alice in Chains discography
