= The Essential Alice in Chains =

Compilation album by Alice in Chains
- Released: September 5, 2006
- Recorded: 1989–1998
- Genre: Alternative metal; grunge; alternative rock; heavy metal
- Length: 129:37
- Label: Columbia
- Producer: Alice in Chains and various producers

Alice in Chains chronology
| Greatest Hits (2001) | The Essential Alice in Chains (2006) | Black Gives Way to Blue (2009) |

Alternative cover
- 2010 reissue cover

Professional ratings
Review scores
| Source | Rating |
|---|---|
| AllMusic | 4.5/5 stars |
| Rolling Stone Album Guide | 3/5 stars |

The Essential Alice in Chains is a two-disc compilation album by the rock band Alice in Chains, and part of Sony BMG's The Essential series. Originally scheduled to be released on March 30, 2004, it was delayed until September 5, 2006. The album was reissued in 2010 with different artwork. A DVD with the mockumentary The Nona Tapes came as a bonus disc with the compilation.

== Overview ==
The third compilation released by the band, it proved to be more a definitive collection than the 10-track Greatest Hits collection and the best of/sampler collection, Nothing Safe: Best of the Box, featuring almost all of the band's hits and singles (with the exception of "Bleed the Freak", "Down in a Hole" and "Fear the Voices") as well as fan favorites and also two unplugged tracks. The songs "What the Hell Have I" and "A Little Bitter" which were featured on the Last Action Hero movie soundtrack are the Toby Wright remixed versions found on Music Bank. It is the band's first release since the death of vocalist Layne Staley.

== Track listing ==
Disc one
| No. | Title | Writer(s) | Length |
|---|---|---|---|
| 1. | "We Die Young" (from Facelift) | Jerry Cantrell | 2:33 |
| 2. | "Man in the Box" (from Facelift) | Cantrell, Layne Staley | 4:47 |
| 3. | "Sea of Sorrow" (from Facelift) | Cantrell | 5:51 |
| 4. | "Love, Hate, Love" (from Facelift) | Cantrell, Staley | 6:29 |
| 5. | "Am I Inside" (from Sap) | Cantrell, Staley | 5:09 |
| 6. | "Brother" (from Sap; alternate mix without Ann Wilson's backing vocals) | Cantrell | 4:29 |
| 7. | "Got Me Wrong" (from Sap) | Cantrell | 4:12 |
| 8. | "Right Turn" (from Sap) | Cantrell | 3:15 |
| 9. | "Rain When I Die" (from Dirt) | Cantrell, Sean Kinney, Mike Starr, Staley | 6:03 |
| 10. | "Them Bones" (from Dirt) | Cantrell | 2:31 |
| 11. | "Angry Chair" (from Dirt) | Staley | 4:49 |
| 12. | "Dam That River" (from Dirt) | Cantrell | 3:11 |
| 13. | "Dirt" (from Dirt) | Cantrell, Staley | 5:17 |
| 14. | "God Smack" (from Dirt) | Cantrell, Staley | 3:51 |
| 15. | "Hate to Feel" (from Dirt) | Staley | 5:17 |
| 16. | "Rooster" (from Dirt) | Cantrell | 6:15 |
| Total length: | | | 74:39 |

Disc two
| No. | Title | Writer(s) | Length |
|---|---|---|---|
| 1. | "No Excuses" (from Jar of Flies) | Cantrell | 4:16 |
| 2. | "I Stay Away" (from Jar of Flies) | Cantrell, Mike Inez, Staley | 4:14 |
| 3. | "What the Hell Have I" (remix, from Music Bank) | Cantrell | 3:54 |
| 4. | "A Little Bitter" (remix, from Music Bank) | Cantrell, Inez, Kinney, Staley | 3:48 |
| 5. | "Grind" (from Alice in Chains) | Cantrell | 4:46 |
| 6. | "Heaven Beside You" (from Alice in Chains) | Cantrell, Inez | 5:30 |
| 7. | "Again" (from Alice in Chains) | Cantrell, Staley | 4:05 |
| 8. | "Over Now" (live acoustic version, from Unplugged) | Cantrell, Kinney | 5:57 |
| 9. | "Nutshell" (live acoustic version, from Unplugged) | Cantrell, Inez, Kinney, Staley | 4:32 |
| 10. | "Get Born Again" (from Nothing Safe: Best of the Box) | Cantrell, Staley | 5:25 |
| 11. | "Died" (from Music Bank) | Cantrell, Staley | 5:58 |
| 12. | "Would?" (from Dirt) | Cantrell | 3:28 |
| Total length: | | | 57:32 |

== Personnel ==
Alice in Chains

- Layne Staley – lead vocals, backing vocals on "Grind", "Heaven Beside You" and "Over Now", rhythm guitar on "Angry Chair" and "Hate to Feel"
- Jerry Cantrell – lead guitar, backing and co-lead vocals and sitar on "What the Hell Have I"
- Mike Starr – bass (disc 1 and "Would?"), additional backing vocals (credited only on tracks 1–4)
- Mike Inez – bass (disc 2, except "Would?"), additional backing vocals (tracks 1–4, 10–11), guitar (tracks 1–7, 10–11)
- Sean Kinney – drums, percussion and piano on "Sea of Sorrow", additional backing vocals (tracks 1–4 on disc 1)

Additional personnel

- Alice Mudgarden (performs "Right Turn")
- Mark Arm – vocals on "Right Turn"
- Chris Cornell – vocals on "Right Turn"
- Ann Wilson – vocals on "Am I Inside"
- April Acevez – viola on "I Stay Away"
- Rebecca Clemons-Smith – violin on "I Stay Away"
- Matthew Weiss – violin on "I Stay Away"
- Justine Foy – cello on "I Stay Away"
- Scott Olson – acoustic guitar on "Nutshell" and "Over Now"

== Charts ==
| Chart (2006) | Peak position |
|---|---|
| US Billboard 200 | 139 |
| Australian Albums (ARIA) | 187 |

== Certifications ==
| Region | Certification | Certified units/sales |
|---|---|---|
| United States (RIAA) | Gold | 500,000^{‡} |
^{‡} Sales+streaming figures based on certification alone.
