= Rooster (song) =

1993 single by Alice in Chains

Single by Alice in Chains

from the album Dirt
- Released: February 22, 1993
- Recorded: March–May 1992
- Studio: Eldorado Recording Studios, Burbank, California; One on One Studios, Los Angeles, California
- Genre: Grunge; alternative metal; alternative rock
- Length: 6:15
- Label: Columbia
- Songwriter: Jerry Cantrell
- Producers: Alice In Chains; Dave Jerden

Alice in Chains singles chronology
"Angry Chair" (1992)	"Rooster" (1993)	"What the Hell Have I" (1993)

"Rooster" is a song by the American rock band Alice in Chains, from their second studio album, Dirt (1992). Columbia Records serviced the song to US radio on February 22, 1993, making it the album's fourth single. It is the fifth song on the original pressing of the album and sixth on others. The song was written by guitarist/vocalist Jerry Cantrell for his father, Jerry Cantrell Sr., whose childhood nickname was "Rooster" and served with the U.S. Army during the Vietnam War. Cantrell would later name his music publishing company Rooster's Son Publishing. "Rooster" spent 20 weeks on Billboard's Mainstream Rock Tracks chart and peaked at No. 7.

An acoustic version performed on Alice in Chains' MTV Unplugged concert was included on the live album Unplugged (1996). Both the studio and the demo version of the song were featured on the box set Music Bank (1999). The song was also included on the compilation albums Greatest Hits (2001), and The Essential Alice in Chains (2006). Metal Hammer ranked "Rooster" at No. 12 on its list of "The 100 Best Metal Songs of the 90s" in 2018, and at No. 2 on its list of "The Top 10 Best Alice in Chains Song" in 2020.

== Origin and recording ==
The demo for "Rooster" was recorded at Eldorado Studios on Los Angeles' Sunset Boulevard during the sessions for the Singles (1992) soundtrack, co-produced by Alice in Chains with Dave Jerden.

In the liner notes of 1999's Music Bank box set collection, songwriter Jerry Cantrell said of the song: "I think there's some vibe on the demo that maybe we didn't get here (on Dirt), but this has something all of its own... quality, for one thing."

== Lyrics ==
The song was written by Alice in Chains guitarist/vocalist Jerry Cantrell for his father, Jerry Cantrell Sr., who served with the U.S. Army during the Vietnam War. "Rooster" was a childhood nickname given to Cantrell Sr. by his great-grandfather, because of his perceived "cocky" attitude and his hair, which used to stick up on top of his head like a rooster's comb.

Cantrell wrote the song while living at Chris Cornell and Susan Silver's house in Seattle at the start of 1991. Silver is Alice in Chains' manager and was Cornell's then-wife. Alone, late at night, Cantrell kept thinking about his father and the psychological scars from his time in the Vietnam War that contributed to the breakdown of his family. Cantrell wrote the lyrics from the standpoint of his father.

In a 1992 interview with Guitar for the Practicing Musician magazine, in response to the question "Do you feel you communicated with [your father] with this song?", Cantrell said:

Yeah. He's heard this song. He's only seen us play once, and I played this song for him when we were in this club opening for Iggy Pop. I'll never forget it. He was standing in the back and he heard all the words and stuff. Of course, I was never in Vietnam and he won't talk about it, but when I wrote this it felt right...like these were things he might have felt or thought. And I remember when we played it he was back by the soundboard and I could see him. He was back there with his big gray Stetson and his cowboy boots — he's a total Oklahoma man — and at the end, he took his hat off and just held it in the air. And he was crying the whole time. This song means a lot to me. A lot.

In the liner notes of 1999's Music Bank box set collection, Jerry Cantrell said of the song:

It was the start of the healing process between my Dad and I from all that damage that Vietnam caused. This was all my perception of his experiences out there. The first time I ever heard him talk about it was when we made the video and he did a 45-minute interview with Mark Pellington and I was amazed he did it. He was totally cool, totally calm, accepted it all and had a good time doing it. It even brought him to the point of tears. It was beautiful. He said it was a weird experience, a sad experience and he hoped that nobody else had to go through it.

Cantrell said of the song in a 2006 interview with Team Rock:

That experience in Vietnam changed him [his father] forever, and it certainly had an effect on our family, so I guess it was a defining moment in my life, too. He didn’t walk out on us. We left him. It was an environment that wasn’t good for anyone, so we took off to live with my grandmother in Washington, and that’s where I went to school. I didn’t have a lot of my father around, but I started thinking about him a lot during that period. I certainly had resentments, as any young person does in a situation where a parent isn’t around or a family is split. But on Rooster, I was trying to think about his side of it – what he might have gone through. To be honest, I didn’t really sit down intending to do any of that; it just kinda came out. But that’s the great thing about music – sometimes it can reach deeper than you ever would in a conversation with anybody. It’s more of a forum to dig deeper. It felt like a major achievement for me as a young writer. When I first played it to my father, I asked him if I’d got close to where he might have been emotionally or mentally in that situation. And he told me: ‘You got too close – you hit it on the head'. It meant a lot to him that I wrote it. It brought us closer. It was good for me in the long-run and it was good for him, too.

Cantrell would later name his music publishing company Rooster's Son Publishing.

== Release and reception ==
Columbia Records serviced "Rooster" to US radio on February 22, 1993, making it the album's fourth single. It debuted at number 29 on Billboard Mainstream Rock Tracks chart on the week ending March 13, 1993, peaked at number seven on the week ending April 24, 1993 and spent a total of 20 weeks on the chart. "Rooster" was released as a commercial single in Australia on May 23, 1993.

Ned Raggett of AllMusic said that the song "[keeps] both the volume and the tenderness in play while tackling a slightly unexpected subject" and that it "alternates between almost dreamy verses, and surging, blasting choruses."

VH1 ranked the song at No. 91 on its "America's Hard 100" list in 2013.

Metal Hammer ranked "Rooster" at No. 12 on its list of "The 100 best metal songs of the 90s" in 2018, and at No. 2 on its list of "The Top 10 Best Alice in Chains Songs" in 2020.

American Songwriter ranked the song at No. 1 on its list of "The Top 10 Alice in Chains Songs" in 2022.

"Rooster" was one of the 150 songs banned by Texas-based radio chain Clear Channel Communications on its memo suggesting that certain songs were "inappropriate" for airplay on its 1,170 radio stations in the aftermath of the September 11, 2001 attacks. Along with "Rooster", other Alice in Chains songs such as "Down in a Hole", "Them Bones" and "Sea of Sorrow" were also included in the memo.

== Music video ==
The music video for "Rooster" was released in February 1993, and was directed by Mark Pellington. The music video featured real Vietnam War documentary/news footage as well as some very realistic, graphically re-enacted combat scenes. Jerry Cantrell's father was a consultant on the video, as it explores Cantrell Jr.'s interpretation of his father's war experience.

The "Rooster" character (played by actor James Elliott), was based on Alice in Chains' guitarist/vocalist, Jerry Cantrell's father (Jerry Cantrell Sr.), whose lifelong nickname was "Rooster." Cantrell Sr. served two combat tours in Vietnam, and also appears in the music video talking about his war experiences. Cantrell Sr.'s scenes were filmed on what was then Cantrell's great uncle's property and is now the site of Jerry Cantrell's family ranch in Atoka, Oklahoma. Cantrell Sr.'s scenes, filmed in stark black & white, show him hunting in the woods as an older man, while having "flashback" memories of his youthful Vietnam combat experiences (which are shot in full color). The uncut (more graphic) version of the video is available on the home video release Music Bank: The Videos. "Rooster" was the last music video to feature original bass player Mike Starr, who is pictured on the cover of the single. The cover shows a completely blacked-out profile of Starr, with two helicopters flying in the background.

The intense combat scenes for the video were actually filmed on location in Angeles National Forest in January 1993 and have been favorably compared to Oliver Stone's classic Vietnam War film Platoon. VN Veteran and Military Technical Advisor Dale Dye served as advisor on both the "Rooster" video and on Platoon, among many other projects in Hollywood. James Elliott (Southland, Entourage, Mafia II) portrayed the title role of "Rooster", the Team Leader of a Long Range Recon Patrol (LRRPs) in the combat scenes. Elliott, who is right-handed, had to learn how to handle multiple combat weapons left handed for the production in order to match the real Cantrell Sr.'s footage (Cantrell Sr. is left handed and holds his knife/rifle that way in the video). The military weapons and gear used and worn by the actors in the video are not all period-authentic. The XM177E1 Assault carbine held by Elliott's character had not yet been issued with a 14-inch barrel(Not until the 1980s) as well as the Nomex flight gloves which were not used until late in the Vietnam War. Dale Dye provided Elliott with some of his own personal combat gear which Dye had actually worn during multiple tours in Vietnam, including his military watch and map light, among other items.

Other actors who appear in the video include Casey Pieretti (well known real-life amputee actor/stunt performer) and popular character actor Jon Gries (Napoleon Dynamite, Lost). Pieretti, who walks/runs extremely well with a prosthetic leg, performed a very graphic and difficult scene in which his leg was "blown off" by a land mine and Elliott's "Rooster" character offers life-saving medical aid on the battlefield. Jon Gries's character is shown being shot in the chest during intense combat with North Vietnamese infantry troops and dying in the arms of Elliott's "Rooster" character in the final emotionally charged combat scenes of the video. Also featured are scenes of a group of children playing with bubbles.

== Live performances ==
Alice in Chains performed an acoustic version of "Rooster" for its appearance on MTV Unplugged in 1996 and the song was included on the Unplugged live album and home video release. Live performances of the song can also be found on the "Heaven Beside You" single, the compilation album Nothing Safe: Best of the Box, and the live album Live.

In the Primus DVD Animals Should Not Try to Act Like People, Alice in Chains are seen playing the song live, with Les Claypool joining the band on stage dressed in a chicken suit. Jerry Cantrell reacts by throwing a bottle at Claypool and chasing him off the stage.

Cantrell's father joined Alice in Chains during "Rooster" on stage for the October 19, 2007, show in Tulsa, at Cain's Ballroom. Jerry Cantrell often introduces his father on stage before playing the song at Alice in Chains' concerts.

== In other media ==
"Rooster" is used as the entrance music for New York Yankees pitcher Carlos Rodón, Boston Red Sox pitcher Garrett Crochet and Philadelphia Phillies star pitcher Zack Wheeler at Yankees, Red Sox, and Phillies home games, respectively. It was also used by UFC fighter Tim Kennedy. The song would also be used for the end credits of Terminator: Salvation (2009), and for the first trailer for Black Phone 2 (2025).

== Track listing ==
All tracks are written by Jerry Cantrell, except where noted.

European release
No.	Title	Writer(s)	Length
1.	"Rooster"		6:18
2.	"Sickman"	Cantrell; Layne Staley	5:29
3.	"It Ain't Like That" (from Facelift)	Cantrell; Mike Starr; Sean Kinney	4:37

Australian release
No.	Title	Length
1.	"Rooster"	6:18
2.	"Dam That River"	3:10

== Personnel ==
- Layne Staley – lead vocals
- Jerry Cantrell – guitar, backing vocals
- Mike Starr – bass
- Sean Kinney – drums

== Chart positions ==
Chart (1993)	Peak position
Australia Alternative (ARIA)	17
US Mainstream Rock (Billboard)	7

Chart (2021)	Peak position
Hungary (Single Top 40)	35

== Certifications ==
Region	Certification	Certified units/sales
United Kingdom (BPI) Sales since 2004	Silver	200,000^{‡}
United States (RIAA)	2× Platinum	2,000,000^{‡}
^{‡} Sales+streaming figures based on certification alone.

== Release history ==
Release dates and formats for "Rooster"
Region	Date	Format(s)	Label(s)	Ref.
United States	February 22, 1993	Radio	Columbia	
Australia	May 23, 1993	CD; cassette	Columbia	

== See also ==
- List of anti-war songs
