= Hate to Feel =

1992 song by Alice in Chains

Song by Alice in Chains

from the album Dirt
- Released: September 29, 1992
- Recorded: 1992
- Length: 5:15 (LP version) 5:58 (when merged with Iron Gland)
- Label: Columbia
- Songwriter: Layne Staley
- Producers: Alice in Chains; Dave Jerden

"Hate to Feel" is the tenth track on American rock band Alice in Chains' album Dirt (1992). The song was included on the compilation albums Music Bank (1999) and The Essential Alice in Chains. It has also been the ninth track on later prints of the album and eleventh on others. Some editions of Dirt may merge this song with the then-unlisted 43-second track "Iron Gland".

== Origin and recording ==
In the liner notes of 1999's Music Bank box set collection, guitarist Jerry Cantrell said of the song:

Again, a lot of pride in seeing Layne grow as a guitarist and songwriter to create something so heavy. He's always been so honest in his songs, which is like all of us. We don't bullshit in our music, we always pushed each other to say it as it needed to be said. We've always been fully for letting it all out.

== Reception ==
Ned Raggett of AllMusic said that the song "shows Alice in Chains in woozy, murkily descending riff mode, taking its time to grind down into the ground" and added, "The near-constant theme on Dirt about drugs, specifically heroin, doesn't disappear here: 'Used to be curious, now the shit's sustenance'."

== Live performances ==
A live performance of "Hate to Feel" can be found on the "Angry Chair" single.

== Personnel ==
- Layne Staley – vocals, rhythm guitar
- Jerry Cantrell – lead guitar, backing vocals
- Mike Starr – bass
- Sean Kinney – drums
