= Angry Chair =

- US commercial cassette single

Single by Alice in Chains

from the album Dirt
- Released: November 30, 1992
- Recorded: 1992
- Genre: Grunge
- Length: 4:48
- Label: Columbia
- Songwriter: Layne Staley
- Producers: Alice in Chains; Dave Jerden

Alice in Chains singles chronology
"Them Bones" (1992)	"Angry Chair" (1992)	"Rooster" (1993)

Music video
- "Angry Chair" on YouTube

"Angry Chair" is a song by the American rock band Alice in Chains from their second studio album, Dirt (1992). Columbia Records serviced the song to US radio on November 30, 1992, making it the album's third single. It is the eleventh song on most copies of the album and twelfth or tenth song on others. The song was included on the compilation albums Nothing Safe: Best of the Box (1999), Music Bank (1999), Greatest Hits (2001), and The Essential Alice in Chains (2006).

== Origin and recording ==
The song was one of the few written entirely by vocalist Layne Staley for the band. In the liner notes of 1999's Music Bank box set collection, guitarist Jerry Cantrell said of the song:

Such a brilliant song. I'm very proud of Layne for writing it. When I've stepped up vocally in the past he's been so supportive, and here was a fine example of him stepping up with the guitar and writing a masterpiece.

== Release and reception ==
Columbia Records serviced "Angry Chair" to US radio on November 30, 1992. It peaked at number 34 on Billboard's Album Rock Tracks chart and number 27 on the Modern Rock Tracks chart. The single was issued in Australia on January 25, 1993, where it reached number 11 on ARIA's Alternative chart. In the UK, it was released on May 24, 1993, peaking at number 33 on the UK Singles Chart and number 28 in Ireland.

Ned Raggett of AllMusic said that "Layne Staley and Jerry Cantrell unsurprisingly are the ones who transform the song into something really spectacular" and added that the song features "entrancing verses, ominous, echo-swathed and charged with a looming destruction."

== Music video ==
The music video for "Angry Chair" was released in 1992 and was directed by Matt Mahurin, who later directed the "No Excuses" music video for the band. The video is available on the home video release Music Bank: The Videos.

== Live performances ==
Dirt marked the introduction of Staley's guitar playing contributions to the group, and "Angry Chair" was one of the few songs he regularly played guitar on during live performances. The song is also a fan favorite. The ending to the song was often used as a lead in to another famous Alice in Chains song "Man in the Box" in concert. The current members of Alice in Chains performed an acoustic version of "Angry Chair" with ex-Stone Temple Pilots/ex-Velvet Revolver lead singer Scott Weiland in concert on September 30, 2007 in Austin, Texas.

Alice in Chains performed an acoustic version of "Angry Chair" for its appearance on MTV Unplugged in 1996 (although the song was omitted from the aired performance) and the song was included on the Unplugged live album and home video release. This version opens with an impromptu rendition by Cantrell of "Gloom, Despair and Agony on Me" from the TV show Hee Haw. Live performances of the song can also be found on the "Heaven Beside You" and "Get Born Again" singles and the live album Live.

== Track listing ==
No.	Title	Writer(s)	Length
1.	"Angry Chair"	Layne Staley	4:47
2.	"Brother" (from Sap)	Jerry Cantrell	4:27

Limited Edition 4 Track Picture CD
No.	Title	Writer(s)	Length
1.	"Angry Chair" (from Dirt)	Staley	4:51
2.	"I Know Somethin' (bout You)" (from Facelift)	Cantrell	4:24
3.	"It Ain't Like That"" (live)	Cantrell; Mike Starr; Sean Kinney	4:40
4.	"Hate to Feel" (live)	Staley	5:35

- Both live tracks recorded March 2, 1993

== Personnel ==
- Layne Staley – rhythm guitar, lead vocals
- Jerry Cantrell – lead guitar, vocals
- Mike Starr – bass
- Sean Kinney – drums

== Charts ==
Chart performance for "Angry Chair"
Chart (1993)	Peak position
Australia Alternative (ARIA)	11
European Hot 100 Singles (Music & Media)	79
Ireland (IRMA)	28
UK Singles (Official Charts)	33
US Album Rock Tracks (Billboard)	34
US Modern Rock Tracks (Billboard)	27

== Release history ==
Release dates and formats for "Angry Chair"
Region	Date	Format(s)	Label(s)	Ref.
United States	November 30, 1992	Radio	Columbia	
Australia	January 25, 1993	CD; cassette	Columbia	
United Kingdom	May 24, 1993	7-inch vinyl; 12-inch vinyl; CD	Columbia	
