= Unplugged (Alice in Chains album) =

1996 live album by Alice in Chains

Live album by Alice in Chains
- Released: July 30, 1996
- Recorded: April 10, 1996
- Venue: Majestic Theater (Brooklyn)
- Genres: Acoustic rock; grunge
- Length: 71:26 (CD); 73:00 (DVD)
- Label: Columbia
- Producers: Toby Wright; Alice in Chains; (CD); Alex Coletti (DVD)

Alice in Chains chronology
| Alice in Chains (1995) | Unplugged (1996) | Nothing Safe: Best of the Box (1999) |

Alice in Chains video chronology
| The Nona Tapes (1995) | Unplugged (1996) | Music Bank: The Videos (1999) |

Singles from Unplugged
- 1. "Over Now" Released: July 17, 1996; 2. "Would?" Released: October 1996

Unplugged is a live album by the American rock band Alice in Chains, released on July 30, 1996, by Columbia Records. It was recorded on April 10, 1996, at the Brooklyn Academy of Music's Majestic Theatre for the television series MTV Unplugged, in which the musicians perform songs on acoustic instruments. The recording was the band's first concert since early 1994. In the interim, lead singer Layne Staley battled a heroin addiction so severe that the group was unable to perform live, leading them to temporarily disband. Nevertheless, the band persevered and released their self-titled third studio album in late 1995, though they remained unable to promote the effort with live shows.

Despite Staley's poor health and guitarist Jerry Cantrell suffering from food poisoning, the performance was a success. The set list mainly consisted of acoustic versions of previously known songs, but also contained brief tributes to Metallica and one new song, "The Killer Is Me", which was performed for the first time. The show was directed by Joe Perota and first aired on MTV on May 28, 1996. The acoustic version of "Over Now" was released as a single in July 1996, and the recording of "Would?" followed in October. Home video releases of the MTV broadcast were released on VHS in October 1996 and on DVD three years later. The album was re-released as a CD/DVD package with bonus footage on September 18, 2007. The Unplugged show was Staley's last headlining performance; he was hospitalized due to a drug overdose weeks before the release of Unplugged, after which he stopped performing and became reclusive. He died in 2002 following another overdose.

Upon release, the album debuted at number three on the Billboard 200 chart. It received a varied response, garnering praise for recreations of the band's heavier material but showing indifference toward already-acoustic recordings as found on Sap and Jar of Flies. Despite the lukewarm critical reception upon its release, it was retrospectively lauded and went on to be certified double platinum by the Recording Industry Association of America (RIAA). The home video release was also certified gold by the RIAA.

== Background ==
Alice in Chains had not toured since co-headlining Lollapalooza in mid-1993 and had not performed live at all since January 1994. They had been scheduled to join Metallica's Shit Hits the Sheds Tour starting in July 1994, including a stop at Woodstock '94, but the band canceled all their scheduled dates one day before the start of the tour due to frontman Layne Staley's heroin addiction. The band parted ways for about six months, and members engaged in their own activities. Staley joined the supergroup Mad Season, with whom he recorded the studio album Above. Bassist Mike Inez appeared on Slash's solo album It's Five O'Clock Somewhere. Guitarist Jerry Cantrell began working on material intended for a solo album, and both Cantrell and drummer Sean Kinney each contributed to the Willie Nelson tribute album Twisted Willie.

Alice in Chains regrouped in early 1995 to work on new material, and by late 1995, they released their self-titled third studio album. They had originally planned to tour in 1996 for the new album, but these plans were scrapped, adding to the rumors of Staley's drug abuse. In the meantime, MTV approached the band with an offer to perform acoustically as part of its MTV Unplugged series. The network had been requesting the band to partake in the series for years, and the band had repeatedly declined the network's advances. Cantrell reasoned that it would be too difficult to make the band sound satisfactory and worried that a televised audience would not be receptive to it s raw, abrasive style, despite its prior experience recording acoustic extended plays, including Sap (1992) and Jar of Flies (1994).

MTV producer Alex Coletti, who oversaw the Unplugged series, was much more confident in the band's ability to prove their grunge sound was viable in an acoustic format. Over its six years on the air, the series had already found success in the grunge market by recording Pearl Jam and Nirvana: "They have the songs, they have the depth, they have the emotion where, when you strip it down, you really find something there. [...] There were other grunge bands, but the three that did it—Pearl Jam, Nirvana, and Alice—they were the right three from that era. And there was just no denying that this band was going to shine, that Layne's voice and those songs were going to shine through," Coletti recounted. After much persuasion, Alice in Chains agreed to perform. According to Cantrell, the band made the right decision by holding off for a long time, in spite of their extensive repertoire: "The band is much tighter now than it used to be. Just because the opportunity is there doesn't always mean that it's the right time to do something."

One factor that made the band's decision easier was the lack of an active concert tour. Had the musicians been recently performing in front of large audiences, Coletti highlighted how difficult it would have been for them to adapt to performing acoustically from a style that was usually much heavier. With no other performing commitments, the band was allowed to focus all of their rehearsal on an entirely different live format than usual. In addition, the recording date for the television performance did not have to be coordinated with a busy touring schedule. Beyond the fact that Alice in Chains was returning after a long absence, what was particularly appealing to fans was that the acoustic nature of the performance aligned with the band's previous work; even the band's most recent studio album was often likened to the acoustics of Jar of Flies.

== Preparation ==
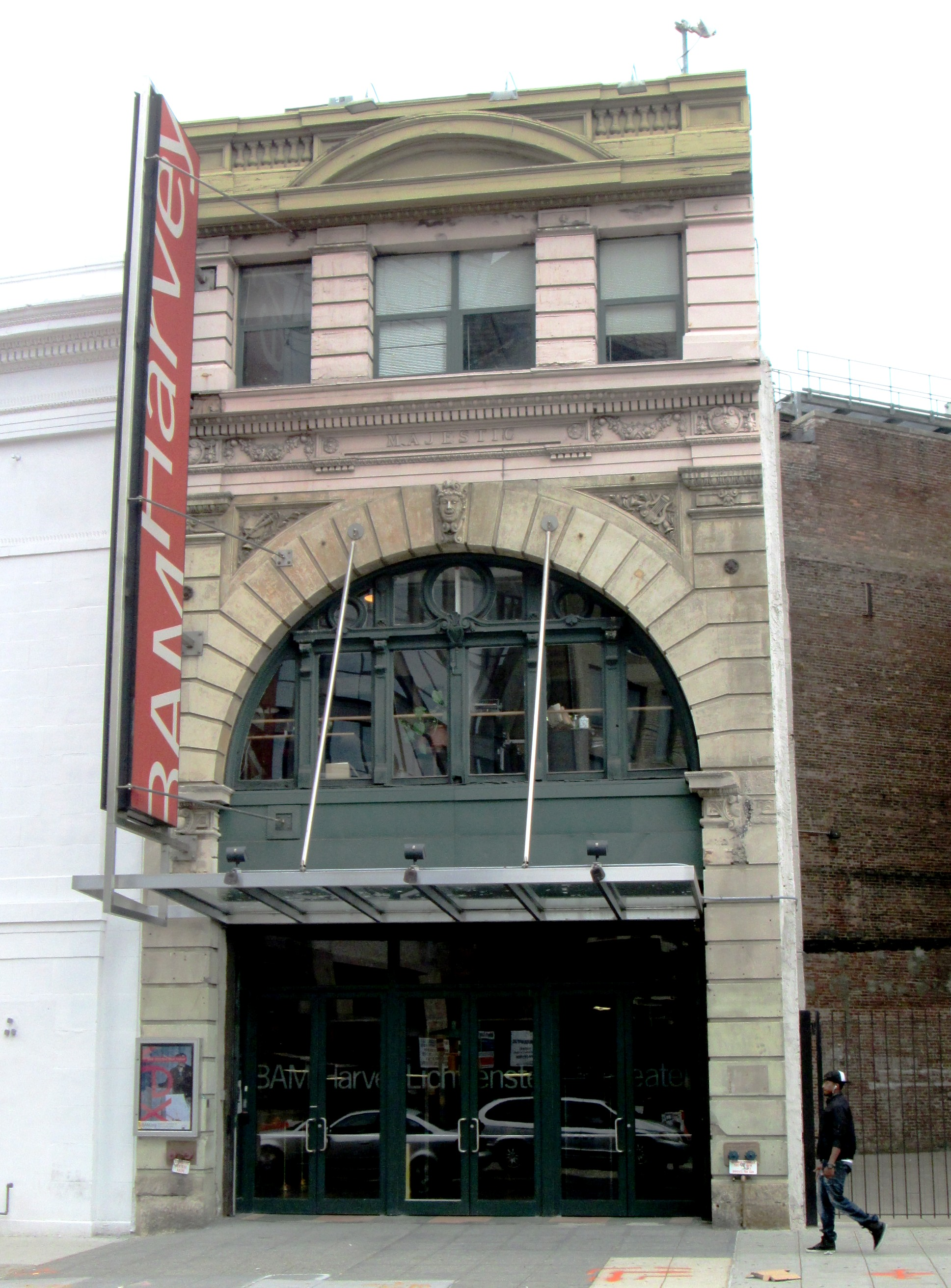
The Harvey Theater (pictured 2013), previously known as the Majestic Theater, was the concert's venue.

Alice in Chains had limited experience performing acoustically live. Prior to the Jar of Flies era, the band took part in an acoustic benefit concert in early January 1994 for John Norwood Fisher of Fishbone, who was having difficulty paying legal fees. (Note: According to Variety, the band was expected to showcase new material from the then-upcoming Jar of Flies, but Cantrell said in 1996 that the band performed four songs from Sap instead.) Being the first time the band deviated from their electric, heavier sound in a live setting, fans at the performance were disappointed with the drastic change in sound. In order to "expand" the sound and simplify the performance for their second attempt at an acoustic set, the band invited guitarist Scott Olson from fellow Seattle-based band Heart to join them for the show. Alice in Chains had collaborated with Heart members on multiple occasions before. On Sap, vocalist Ann Wilson performed backing vocals on two songs; one of them, "Brother", was recorded for Unplugged.

Rehearsals began in Seattle but were continuously hampered by problems. According to Kinney, there was "barely any rehearsing at all, guys not showing up—the same shit". Cantrell agreed, "everyone always show[ed] up at different times and we usually just end up talking and goofing around anyway. [...] We always kind of end up flying by the seat of our pants." Coletti was never aware of the continuing issues the band was facing in the lead-up to the performance. When he first visited the band, he was impressed with Staley's condition. He was even more so when he heard Staley sing during rehearsals, stating that choosing the band to perform was "already a home run—this was a slam dunk". In early April 1996, the band arrived in New York to prepare for the show. Alice in Chains producer Toby Wright was brought back to produce the taping of the Unplugged show; the band rehearsed at Sony Music Studios with Wright, and he was also pleased with what he heard.

The Brooklyn Academy of Music's Majestic Theater, now known as the Harvey Theater, was chosen as the venue for filming the Unplugged performance. The semicircular shape of the amphitheater was ideal for acoustic performances. An art director for Unplugged wanted the stage's appearance to match the gloomy attitude of the music being performed, so they intentionally renovated the space to look old and decrepit. Stagehands fired multiple gunshots into the walls to create cracks. Peeling paint was also applied by hand. It was Staley's idea to have big candles decorating the stage to keep it dark and moody, since the band never liked bright lights on stage. Staley bought the candles at Seattle's Pike Place Market. At the last minute, a request came to use lava lamps to decorate the stage, adding an unexpected visual element. Footage of the show shows the translucent paraffin wax in the lamps barely moving, emphasizing the mood of the performance itself. The concert organizers achieved this effect by accident, simply because they were unaware that the lamps needed to be properly warmed up in advance for their intended effect. Staley had recently dyed his hair pink, so the lighting technician decided to match the stage backdrop to it. Unique lighting color schemes were chosen for each song. The band had predetermined their setlist and provided it to MTV, so lighting was selected well in advance.

== Concert ==
The Brooklyn concert was scheduled for April 10, 1996. The performance was fraught with a number of problems and delays. Cantrell was suffering from food poisoning caused by a hot dog consumed before the gig. Before the show, he was vomiting constantly, so a trash can was placed next to him on the stage. Staley also appeared ill due to his drug addiction; when the lead singer spoke between songs, a noticeable weakness could be heard in his voice. The band's guitar technician, Randy Biro, was also addicted to heroin, and both he and Staley went into severe withdrawal before the show. Biro forgot his heroin and sent someone to get more. Staley, on the other hand, was prepared with a glass bottle sealed with a cork cap containing ready-to-use heroin and took a hit just before the show. According to Biro, he had only used a slight amount of the drug: "He hadn't done enough where he was nodding off and drooling [...] he didn't do a lot". Wright worked from a mobile studio in a truck outside the venue, where he would produce the audio and communicate with the band in case anything needed to be redone. Coletti, on the other hand, would be responsible for producing the televised performance, rotating between the production truck outside and the venue inside. There were only 400 seats available for the show that evening, though thousands of people attempted to gain admission.

The musicians prepared thirteen songs for the concert. Some songs were eliminated immediately, while the band worked on others for some time until realizing that they would not sound good when performed acoustically. Ultimately, the band put together a setlist that would satisfy both casual listeners and ardent fans. It included material from all of the band's releases up to that point, with the exception of their debut album, Facelift (1990). The omission was not intentional; the band had planned to include the Facelift tracks "We Die Young" and "Love, Hate, Love", but abandoned these when time constraints prevented them from fitting them in the taping. These time constraints also left little room for improvisation, and the songs were mostly performed as acoustic versions of how they would have sounded on their original album. Cantrell played acoustic guitar, maintaining vocal harmonies with Staley's lead. Inez made the most of his acoustic bass, while Kinney maintained the groove on drums. Olson completed the lineup as a second guitarist. According to Cantrell, he did not feel ill once the performance was underway but was immediately sick again at its conclusion: "when the lights went green, the cameras started rolling, my body gave me some adrenaline and dopamine I needed to get through it. [...] As soon as it was over, I went back to feeling crappy again."

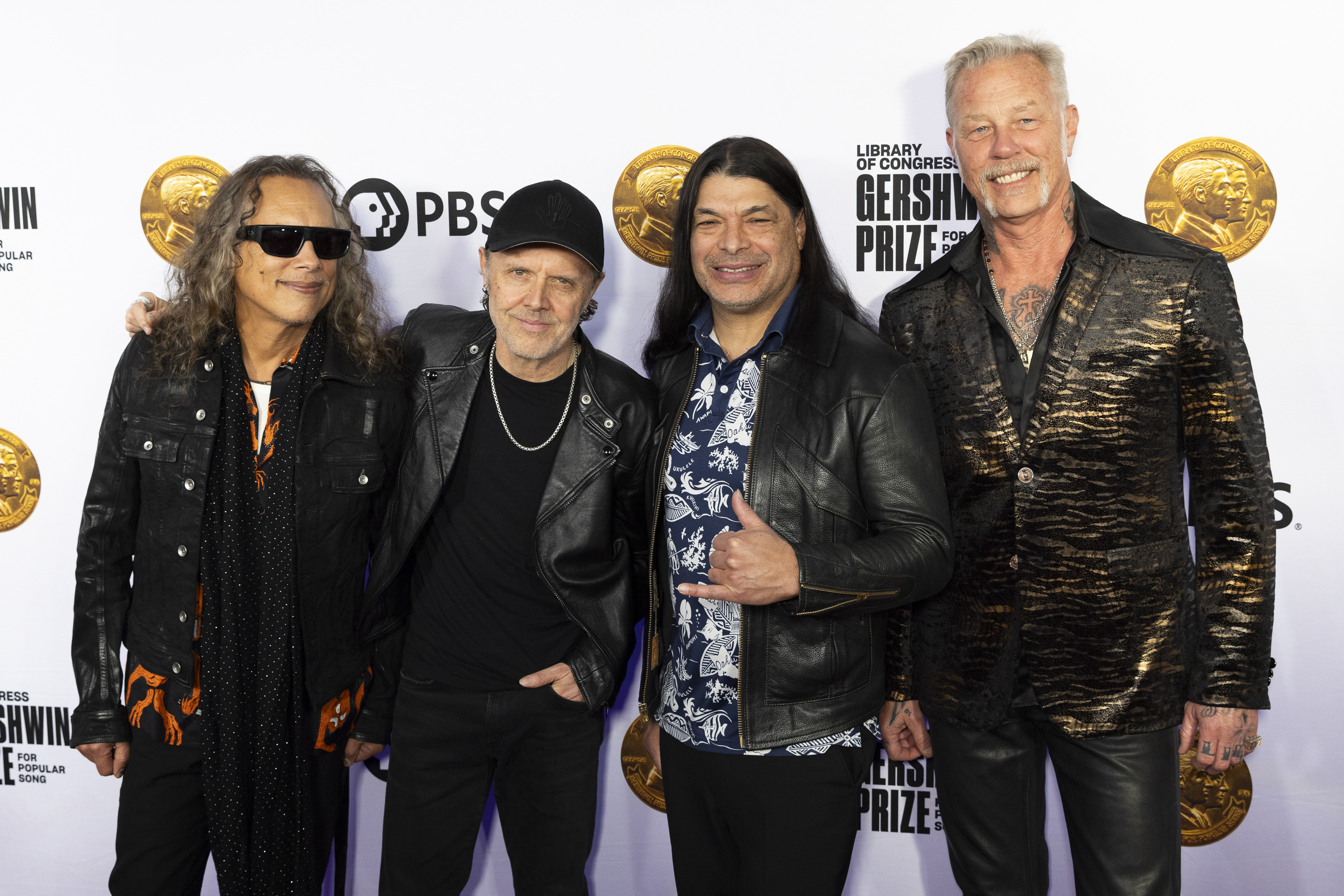
The members of Metallica (pictured 2024 (Note: Second from the right is bassist Robert Trujillo, who did not join Metallica until 2003; Jason Newsted (not pictured) was the band's bassist at the time.)) attended and received multiple tributes during the performance.

The performance began with the song "Nutshell". The band followed with two more songs that were already familiar acoustics: the Eastern-influenced "Brother" from Sap and Jar of Flies's hit single "No Excuses". Afterward, the band began performing songs from Dirt (1992) as well as the recently released Alice in Chains that had not yet been heard in acoustic formats. The hits "Rooster", "Down in a Hole", "Would?", "Angry Chair", and "Heaven Beside You" all featured in the setlist, with the Sap track "Got Me Wrong" also included among the later performances that night. Some songs held the distinction of being performed live acoustically before ever being showcased in their original form; being that this was the band's first performance since before the release of their self-titled album, this included that album's material, but it was also the first time "Down in a Hole" had ever been played live.

The entire concert lasted over three hours due to the work involved with setting up cameras, lighting, sound selection, and a large number of performing mistakes, which had to be recorded several times. For example, "Sludge Factory" had multiple errors, and "Got Me Wrong" was attempted four times in total. In the case of "Sludge Factory", Staley made several lyrical mistakes that Wright believed may have been caused by stress and anxiety; Columbia Records president Don Ienner and Sony Music vice president Michele Anthony – to whom the lyrics of "Sludge Factory" refer – were sitting in the audience directly in front of the singer. After several attempts, the latest of which Staley aborted after accidentally transposing the second line of the second verse into the first verse's second line, Cantrell joked with the audience: "We're allowed a couple of those, it’s been awhile. You guys just get to hear more, that's all," following which Cantrell and Staley heckled each other in humorous spirit, culminating with Staley asking, "What's my motivation here?", drawing applause and laughter from the audience as the band recorded a successful take.

Also among the audience were the members of Metallica. With what little time they had for improvisational performances, Alice in Chains played two short acoustic tributes to Metallica. Inez played the beginning of their hit song "Enter Sandman" prior to "Sludge Factory"; Inez's bass had the phrase "Friends don't let friends get friends haircuts..." written on it, directed at the members of Metallica, one or more of whom had recently cut their hair short. Prior to the performance of "Angry Chair," Cantrell began playing "Battery", before briefly transitioning to singing "Gloom, Despair, and Agony on Me" from the variety television show Hee Haw. The performance was concluded with the introduction of a new song, "The Killer Is Me". Cantrell had written the song's opening riff and chorus over a year prior; Staley expressed a desire at that time to add to the song, but never did so, and Kinney suggested finishing the song immediately to debut for the performance. Cantrell finished the song only hours before the show.

== Release ==
MTV sent the band the first draft of the recording about two weeks after the concert. Staley, upon reviewing the finished material, was dissatisfied with the results and did not want it released. Staley's particular concern was that the original recording presented him in a way that would invite stigmatization and draw undue attention to his addiction problems. For example, despite the fact that Staley was constantly focused during the show, the video included segments that implied he was sleepy and sluggish. Staley would sit with his eyes closed for several bars in a row, and when he finally began to sing, the camera would cut to someone else, giving the appearance that he was sleeping through the performance. With this concern in mind, Wright evaluated the footage and made specific time-stamped suggestions to submit to MTV, and they granted the changes. The final version, directed by Joe Perota, aired on MTV on May 28, 1996. "Angry Chair", "Frogs", and "The Killer Is Me" were omitted from the broadcast.

On May 31, 1996, three days after the performance aired on MTV, Billboard announced that the performance would be released as a live album. It was originally set for release on July 18, but its release was delayed until July 30. In addition to its CD release, it was also released on VHS. The performances of "Over Now" and "Would?" served as the album's singles; "Over Now" preceded the album on July 17, and "Would?" followed in mid-October 1996. A full-length DVD of the concert had also been released by November 1999. Although omitted from the television broadcast, "Angry Chair", "Frogs", and "The Killer Is Me" were included on all physical releases of the performance. The album was re-released as a CD/DVD package on September 18, 2007.

== Reception ==
=== Initial reactions ===
Professional ratings
Review scores
| Source | Rating |
|---|---|
| AllMusic | 2.5/5 stars |
| Entertainment Weekly | C |
| Music Central Online | 4/5 stars |
| NME | 3/10 |
| The Philadelphia Inquirer | 3/4 stars |
| The Republican | 3/5 stars |
| Rolling Stone | 3/5 stars |
| San Antonio Express-News | 2.5/4 stars |
| Select | 3/5 stars |
| The Forum | 3.5/5 stars |

The album initially received mixed reviews from critics. AllMusic's Stephen Thomas Erlewine lamented that the performance "doesn't offer anything that the albums don't already", dismissing the new arrangements of heavier material as novelties and the previous acoustic material as "rehashes of their previous work" with less enthusiasm. Writing for Entertainment Weekly, Tom Sinclair found the acoustic arrangements ineffective against the overarching "junked-out despondency" of the performance: "One emerges from a listening session with an unclean feeling." In his review for The A.V. Club, Stephen Thompson was unimpressed that the band offered "the most obvious reinterpretations you could imagine: They sound exactly like the originals." However, he viewed the self-titled album's new renditions as an improvement over the originals, particularly "Sludge Factory", though he found this a low standard to reach. Robert Johnson felt similarly when writing for the San Antonio Express-News, finding the album unimaginative and criticizing the lack of improvisation compared to Nirvana's Unplugged performance.

In his review for The Republican, Kevin O'Hare remarked that the novelty of the Unplugged series as a whole had begun to wear off by the time Alice in Chains performed, though their performance was still somewhat enjoyable considering the band was among the lesser-expected acts in the format. He summarized that "the music still seems designed for those hanging onto a high-rise ledge, but while capturing a mood, there's a definite substantive sense playing out here as well." Sandy Masuo praised the band for affirming their talents despite their turmoil in her review for Rolling Stone. Even so, she found that the band was better heard in their conventional, fully-electric format. Select's Ben Mitchell was complimentary of the band's older material, including electric compositions such as "Rooster" and existing acoustics like "Brother", likening their performance to that of Stone Temple Pilots' 1993 episode, but panned the selections from Alice in Chains save for "Over Now".

In a more positive review, The Philadelphia Inquirer critic Sara Sherr noted that the performance displayed the band's vulnerability and praised the segments of comic relief shown throughout, evoking feelings of hope despite the band's documented personal problems. Steve Bailey stated the band was "at its finest" in a review for the Naples Daily News. He likened Cantrell and Staley's vocal chemistry to John Lennon and Paul McCartney and highlighted the heavier material, particularly the renditions of "Rooster" and "Would?", as standouts. In The Forum, Chuck Klosterman agreed, finding the band even more listenable in the stripped-down style than the heavy metal style they were known for and praising the performance of "Sludge Factory" as an improvement over what he described as a comparatively unremarkable studio version. Billboard's Paul Verna praised the band for sounding sonically consistent, concluding, "Performed with piercing intimacy and beautifully recorded, this album will likely animate mainstream rock playlists and give the band another boost at MTV."

=== Retrospective assessment ===
Despite the lukewarm critical reception upon release, the album eventually gained more recognition and praise due to Staley's powerful performance despite his poor health; after he died in 2002, several outlets recognized it as a landmark live album. Diffuser's Brendan Manley chronicled the album as "a fleeting moment preserved forever...a documentation of a final contribution from one of the great vocalists of our time." Loudwire hailed Unplugged as "legendary" in 2016 and included the recording of "Down in a Hole" as one of a compilation of "10 unforgettable Layne Staley moments". The following year, Andy Greene ranked Alice in Chains' recording fourth on Rolling Stone's list of the top 15 performances in the history of Unplugged, dubbing it "their last true great moment with Staley".

In an article for the album's 23rd anniversary in 2019, Alice Pattillo of Metal Hammer opined that Alice in Chains' Unplugged performance was the best live album ever made in light of the external factors surrounding the show. NME's Will Lavin agreed that Staley's performance, despite his substance abuse issues, made the show a particular standout in the Unplugged series, ranking it fifth in the publication's list of the best 20 performances across the series. Years after the performance, Kinney remembered being proud of the result: "Right then is when I knew, 'Ok, if we never do anything again, I’m good with this. I’d rather leave on a high point instead of throwing drug paraphernalia into a garbage can in an airport, while I’m jumping on a plane, hoping to not get arrested.'" Korn frontman Jonathan Davis went on to cite Alice in Chains' performance on Unplugged as an inspiration for his own band's recording of the program in 2007. In 2026, Unplugged was ranked 29th on Consequence's list of the top 60 albums of 1996.

=== Commercial performance ===
The album sold 124,000 copies in its first week of release, debuting at number three on the Billboard 200. Among all the albums in the MTV Unplugged series, only Nirvana's MTV Unplugged In New York (1994) and Rod Stewart's Unplugged...and Seated (1993) debuted higher in the charts. Moreover, unlike Nirvana's performance, which was not going to be released as an album until Kurt Cobain's death spurred the MTV episode's popularity, interest in Alice in Chains' album has remained consistent since its release. "Over Now" reached numbers four and twenty-four on the Billboard Hot Mainstream Rock Tracks and Modern Rock Tracks charts, respectively, while "Would?" placed at number nineteen on the former chart. The album was certified platinum by the RIAA in the first two months following its release and eventually reached double platinum status in 2022. In addition to its CD release, the home video received gold certification from the RIAA in 2001.

== Post-release ==
The Unplugged performance renewed optimism in the band and led to an offer for an opening slot on a classic lineup reunion tour for Kiss. Titled the Alive/Worldwide Tour, it began on June 28, 1996, at Tiger Stadium in Detroit. Coletti was in attendance at the Detroit show and praised the band's performance, but Kerrang! reported that Staley appeared unwell from the start of the run. The band played only four shows for the tour, making further stops in Louisville and St. Louis, before a final stop in Kansas City on July 3. The Kansas City show became Staley's final live performance; after the show, Staley overdosed and was rushed to a Kansas City hospital.

Staley suffered another setback on October 29, 1996, when his ex-fiancée Demri Parrott died from a drug overdose at the age of 27. According to several who knew him, including Biro and Staley's pre-Alice in Chains collaborator Nick Pollock, it triggered a mental downward spiral from which he would not recover. The group's only further activity with Staley was when they recorded two new songs, "Get Born Again" and "Died", for the box set Music Bank (1999) in 1998. After that, Staley rarely left his condominium in Seattle. It was there that he died on April 5, 2002, from another drug overdose, and the band entered an indefinite hiatus. The band re-formed in 2005 and brought in Comes With the Fall vocalist William DuVall as Staley's successor in 2006. DuVall had been in the audience at the Louisville show during their tour with Kiss nearly a decade prior.

== Track listing ==
All tracks are written by Jerry Cantrell, except where noted.

| No. | Title | Lyrics | Music | Original release | Length |
|---|---|---|---|---|---|
| 1. | "Nutshell" | Layne Staley | Cantrell; Mike Inez; Sean Kinney | Jar of Flies (1994) | 4:57 |
| 2. | "Brother" | | | Sap (1992) | 5:27 |
| 3. | "No Excuses" | | | Jar of Flies | 4:57 |
| 4. | "Sludge Factory" ( (Note: The DVD release includes one of the failed takes of "Sludge Factory", in which Staley mixes up the lyrics at the beginning of the song and halts the performance shortly after. They then complete the "formal" take, which was used on other formats. The DVD's introduction to "Sludge Factory" also contains portions of Metallica's "Enter Sandman", written by James Hetfield, Lars Ulrich, and Kirk Hammett.)) | Staley | Cantrell; Kinney | Alice in Chains (1995) | 4:36 |
| 5. | "Down in a Hole" | | | Dirt (1992) | 5:46 |
| 6. | "Angry Chair" | Staley | Staley | Dirt | 4:36 |
| 7. | "Rooster" | | | Dirt | 6:41 |
| 8. | "Got Me Wrong" | | | Sap | 4:59 |
| 9. | "Heaven Beside You" | | Cantrell; Inez | Alice in Chains | 5:38 |
| 10. | "Would?" | | | Dirt | 3:43 |
| 11. | "Frogs" | Staley | Cantrell; Kinney; Inez | Alice in Chains | 7:30 |
| 12. | "Over Now" | | Cantrell; Kinney | Alice in Chains | 7:12 |
| 13. | "The Killer Is Me" ( (Note: The song is variably referred to as "The Killer Is Me" or "Killer Is Me". Cantrell introduces the song under the former title, but the broadcast listed it onscreen as "Killer Is Me". The CD and the vinyl track listings also list the song as "Killer Is Me", but the DVD's track list displays it as "The Killer Is Me". When the song reappeared in the Music Bank box set, the title is again listed as "The Killer Is Me".)) | | | | 5:23 |
| Total length: | | | | | 71:26 |

== Personnel ==
Alice in Chains

- Layne Staley – vocals; additional acoustic guitar on "Angry Chair"
- Jerry Cantrell – acoustic guitar, vocals
- Mike Inez – acoustic bass guitar; acoustic guitar on "The Killer Is Me"
- Sean Kinney – drums

Additional performer

- Scott Olson – acoustic guitar; acoustic bass guitar on "The Killer Is Me"

Production

- Produced by Toby Wright and Alice in Chains
- Produced for MTV by Alex Coletti
- Recorded by Toby Wright and John Harris, assisted by Brian Kingman, John Bates, and Rich Lamb
- Mixed by Toby Wright, assisted by John Bleich and John Seymour
- Digitally edited by Don C. Tyler
- Mastered by Stephen Marcussen
- DVD audio by John Alberts, Toby Wright, and Mike Fisher
- Directed by Joe Perota
- Line producer – Audrey Morrissey
- Art direction – Mary Maurer
- Design – Doug Erb
- Photography – Danny Clinch

== Charts ==
=== Weekly charts ===
| Chart (1996) | Peak position |
|---|---|
| Australian Albums (ARIA) | 12 |
| Austrian Albums (Ö3 Austria) | 23 |
| Belgian Albums (Ultratop Flanders) | 15 |
| Dutch Albums (Album Top 100) | 33 |
| Finnish Albums (Suomen virallinen lista) | 13 |
| German Albums (Offizielle Top 100) | 46 |
| New Zealand Albums (RMNZ) | 8 |
| Norwegian Albums (VG-lista) | 9 |
| Scottish Albums (Official Charts) | 28 |
| Swedish Albums (Sverigetopplistan) | 7 |
| Swiss Albums (Schweizer Hitparade) | 41 |
| UK Albums (Official Charts) | 20 |
| US Billboard 200 | 3 |

| Chart (2026) | Peak position |
|---|---|
| German Rock & Metal Albums (Offizielle Top 100) | 12 |
| Hungarian Physical Albums (MAHASZ) | 6 |
| Hungarian Vinyl Albums (MAHASZ) | 4 |
| Norwegian Rock Albums (IFPI Norge) | 4 |
| Portuguese Albums (AFP) | 129 |
| US Top Rock & Alternative Albums (Billboard) | 4 |

=== Year-end charts ===
| Chart (1996) | Position |
|---|---|
| US Billboard 200 | 98 |

=== Singles ===
| Year | Song | Peak positions | |
| Year | Song | US Main | US Mod |
|---|---|---|---|
| 1996 | "Over Now" | 4 | 24 |
| 1996 | "Would?" | 19 | — |
"—" denotes releases that did not chart.

=== Video ===
| Chart (1996) | Peak position |
|---|---|
| US Top Music Videos | 7 |

== Certifications ==
Certifications for Unplugged
| Region | Certification | Certified units/sales |
|---|---|---|
| Canada (Music Canada) | Gold | 50,000^{^} |
| United Kingdom (BPI) | Silver | 60,000^{‡} |
| United States (RIAA) | 2× Platinum | 2,000,000^{‡} |
| United States (RIAA) Home video | Gold | 50,000^{^} |
^{^} Shipments figures based on certification alone.^{‡} Sales+streaming figures based on certification alone.
