= Eldorado Recording Studios =

Recording studio in Burbank, California

Eldorado Recording Studios is a recording studio in Burbank, California originally established in 1954 at the corner of Hollywood and Vine as a workshop for Johnny Otis. In 1987, following damage the building sustained from numerous earthquakes, Eldorado moved to the late Marvin Gaye's former studio on Sunset Boulevard, where many albums were recorded during the alternative rock and grunge-era (1989 to 1996). In 1996, the studio then relocated to its current Burbank facilities which were designed and built from the ground up by Steven Klein.

Albums or simply tracks were recorded at Eldorado by Canned Heat, Slayer, Brian Eno, Talking Heads, Red Hot Chili Peppers, Herbie Hancock, Jane's Addiction, Social Distortion, Alice in Chains, MxPx, The Offspring, Beowülf, Against Me!, Head Automatica, Avenged Sevenfold, My Chemical Romance, Anthrax, Kreator, Icehouse.

Eldorado is a full-service studio. Having served as "home base" to producer Dave Jerden from 1981 to 2004, Eldorado now caters to a variety of producers, engineers and artists.

== Recordings made at Eldorado ==
Band or artist	Album(s) and/or song(s)	Year(s) of recording
Canned Heat	Vintage	1966
David Byrne and Brian Eno	My Life in the Bush of Ghosts	1979–80
Talking Heads	Remain in Light (mixing sessions)	1980
Jerry Harrison	The Red and the Black	1981
Icehouse	Fresco	1982
Icehouse	Sidewalk	1984
Red Hot Chili Peppers	The Red Hot Chili Peppers	1984
Slayer	Hell Awaits	1985
Fates Warning	The Spectre Within	1985
Clint Ruin and Lydia Lunch	Stinkfist	1986
Red Hot Chili Peppers	The Uplift Mofo Party Plan	1987
Jane's Addiction	Nothing's Shocking	1987–88
Kreator	Coma of Souls	1990
Throwing Muses	The Real Ramona	1990
Public Image Ltd.	That What Is Not	1991
Social Distortion	Somewhere Between Heaven and Hell	1991
Alice in Chains	Dirt, "Fear the Voices" (appears on Music Bank box set)	1992
Anthrax	Sound of White Noise	1992
Beowülf	Un-Sentimental	1992–93
Sacred Reich	Independent	1992
Meat Puppets	Too High to Die (mixing sessions)	1993
Donovan	Sutras	1994–96
White Zombie	"Children of the Grave" (appears on Black Sabbath tribute album Nativity in Black)	1994
Orange 9mm	Driver Not Included	1995
The Offspring	Ixnay on the Hombre	1996
Biohazard	Mata Leão	1996
Stavesacre	Friction	1996
Strictly Ballroom	Hide Here Forever	1996
Stabbing Westward	Darkest Days	1997
Stavesacre	Absolutes	1997
Project 86	Project 86	1998
The Offspring	Americana	1998
Pitchshifter	Deviant	1999–2000
MxPx	Before Everything & After	2003
Opiate for the Masses	The Spore	2004
Jewel	Goodbye Alice in Wonderland	2005–06
My Chemical Romance	The Black Parade	2006
Avenged Sevenfold	Avenged Sevenfold	2007
Queensrÿche	American Soldier	2008
Flight of Bullets	Miyulasiye	2013
Biffy Clyro	Ellipsis	2016
