= Them Bones =

1992 single by Alice in Chains

- Standard artwork

Single by Alice in Chains

from the album Dirt
- Released: September 14, 1992
- Genre: Grunge; alternative metal
- Length: 2:30
- Label: Columbia
- Songwriter: Jerry Cantrell
- Producers: Alice in Chains; Dave Jerden

Alice in Chains singles chronology
| "Would?" (1992) | "Them Bones" (1992) | "Angry Chair" (1992) |

Music video
- "Them Bones" on YouTube

"Them Bones" is a song by the American rock band Alice in Chains from their second studio album, Dirt (1992). Columbia Records serviced the song to US radio on September 14, 1992, making it the album's second single. "Them Bones" peaked at No. 24 on Billboard's Mainstream Rock chart and at No. 30 on the Modern Rock Tracks chart. The song was included on the band's compilation albums Nothing Safe: Best of the Box (1999), Greatest Hits (2001) and The Essential Alice in Chains (2006). It was also included on the box set Music Bank (1999). A live performance of the song was included on their second live album, Live (2000).

== Structure ==
The song was written by guitarist Jerry Cantrell. The chromatic riff is played in a time signature of 7/8—except for the chorus, which is in 4/4. When discussing the use of odd time signatures in a 1998 interview with Guitar World, Cantrell said:

I really don't know where that comes from; it just comes naturally to me. I could sit down and figure it out, but what's the use? Off-time stuff is just more exciting – it takes people by surprise when you shift gears like that before they even know what the hell hit 'em. It's also effective when you slow something down and then slam 'em into the dash. A lot of Alice stuff is written that way – "Them Bones" is a great off-time song.

== Lyrics ==
Jerry Cantrell said of the song in a 1993 interview with RIP Magazine:

"We [Alice in Chains] definitely have a very sarcastic sense of humor even toward ourselves. You have to be able to laugh at yourself. The music is a way for us to let some serious things out because we're not really talkative people. It's hard for a lot of people to talk about emotions that are really deep pain and hurt and shit like that. 'Them Bones' is pretty cut and dried. It's a little sarcastic, but it's pretty much about dealing with your mortality and life. Everybody's going to die someday. Instead of being afraid of it, that's the way it is: so enjoy the time you've got. Live as much as you can, have as much fun as possible. Face your fear and live. I had family members die at a fairly early age; so I've always had kind of a phobia about it. Death freaks me out. I think it freaks a lot of people out. It's the end of life, depending on your views. It's a pretty scary thing. 'Them Bones' is trying to put that thought to rest. Use what you have left, and use it well".

In the liner notes of 1999's Music Bank box set collection, Cantrell said of the song:

"I was just thinking about mortality, that one of these days we'll end up a pile of bones. It's a thought for every human being, whether you believe in an after-life or that when we die, that's it. The thought that all the beautiful things and knowledge and experiences you've been through just end when you end scares me, the thought that when you close your eyes for good, it's gone forever".

== Release and reception ==
Columbia Records serviced "Them Bones" to US radio on September 14, 1992, making it the album's second single. It peaked at No. 24 on Billboard's Mainstream Rock chart and at No. 30 on the Modern Rock Tracks chart in November 1992. The single was released on March 8, 1993, in the UK, where it reached No. 26.

It is one of the band's most well-known songs. Ned Raggett of AllMusic called the song "a brief, tightly wound explosion of sheer, inescapable riff power, focused and relentless" and added that "having made its point in two and a half minutes it stops — not a note is wasted". In 2014, Loudwire ranked the song at No. 6 on their list of the 10 greatest Alice in Chains songs, and in 2021, Kerrang! ranked the song at No. 2 on their list of the 20 greatest Alice in Chains songs.

== Music video ==
The music video for "Them Bones" was released in 1992 and was directed by Rocky Schenck, who had previously directed the "We Die Young" music video for the band, and who would later direct the music videos for "What the Hell Have I" and "Grind". The video is available on the home video release Music Bank: The Videos. The video was also featured on an episode of Beavis and Butt-Head (the episode Sick in 1993) where Butt-head claims that "this is the coolest video I've ever seen."

The video shows the band performing in a large dirt hole. In front of the band is a puddle, in which can be seen Layne Staley singing or various animals fighting with or eating each other and a child being born, which corresponds with the lyrics "Some say / We're born into the grave."

== Cover versions ==
In 2006, Swedish death metal band Grave covered the song which appears on their seventh album, As Rapture Comes. In 2009, American deathcore band Suicide Silence covered the song which appears as a bonus track on the iTunes special edition of their second album, No Time to Bleed. An EP released in 2010 by the German black metal band Secrets of the Moon also features a cover version. Alex De Rosso did a cover on his 2013 album Lions & Lambs. In 2020, American sludge metal band Thou covered the song as part of the "Dirt Redux" covers compilation for Magnetic Eye Records. In 2023, American rapper Post Malone performed an acoustic rendition of the song on The Howard Stern Show. Disco/funk band The Free Label has covered the song on the spot for music education channel Musora. In 2025, metal band 40 Below Summer covered it on their album Untethered.

== In popular culture ==
"Them Bones" is featured on the soundtrack of the English version of Street Fighter II: The Animated Movie. It is also featured in the video games Grand Theft Auto: San Andreas, ATV Offroad Fury, Madden NFL 10, Guitar Hero II, Guitar Hero Smash Hits, and Tony Hawk's Pro Skater 3 + 4. "Them Bones" also appeared in the 2004 surfing documentary Riding Giants.

== Track listing ==
All tracks are written by Jerry Cantrell, except where noted.

| No. | Title | Writer(s) | Length |
|---|---|---|---|
| 1. | "Them Bones" | | 2:30 |
| 2. | "Bleed the Freak" | | 4:01 |
| 3. | "It Ain't Like That" | Cantrell; Mike Starr; Sean Kinney | 4:37 |

== Personnel ==
Alice in Chains

- Layne Staley – lead vocals
- Jerry Cantrell – guitars, backing vocals
- Mike Starr – bass
- Sean Kinney – drums

Production

- Dave Jerden – production, mixing

== Charts ==
| Chart (1992–1993) | Peak position |
|---|---|
| Australia (ARIA) | 93 |
| Australia Alternative (ARIA) | 14 |
| European Hot 100 Singles (Music & Media) | 76 |
| Ireland (IRMA) | 22 |
| UK Singles (Official Charts) | 26 |
| US Mainstream Rock (Billboard) | 24 |
| US Alternative Airplay (Billboard) | 30 |

== Certifications ==
| Region | Certification | Certified units/sales |
|---|---|---|
| United States (RIAA) | Platinum | 1,000,000^{‡} |
^{‡} Sales+streaming figures based on certification alone.

== Release history ==
Release dates and formats for "Them Bones"
| Region | Date | Format(s) | Label(s) | Ref. |
|---|---|---|---|---|
| United States | September 14, 1992 | Radio | Columbia | |
| United Kingdom | March 8, 1993 | 7-inch vinyl; CD | Columbia | |
| Australia | October 18, 1993 | CD; cassette | Columbia | |
