= Fear the Voices =

1999 single by Alice in Chains

Promotional single by Alice in Chains

from the album Music Bank
- Released: October 11, 1999
- Recorded: March–May 1992
- Studio: Eldorado (Burbank); London Bridge (Seattle); One on One (Los Angeles)
- Genre: Funk metal
- Length: 4:58
- Label: Columbia
- Songwriters: Mike Starr; Jerry Cantrell; Layne Staley
- Producers: Dave Jerden; Alice in Chains

Alice in Chains singles chronology
| "Get Born Again" (1999) | "Fear the Voices" (1999) | "A Looking in View" (2009) |

"Fear the Voices" is a song by the American rock band Alice in Chains, released on their box set Music Bank (1999). It was released to US radio on October 11, 1999, by Columbia Records.

== Origin and recording ==
"Fear the Voices" is an outtake from the Dirt album, recorded in 1992. The song would remain unreleased until 1999, when it was released on the Music Bank box set and also issued as a promotional single.

In the liner notes of 1999's Music Bank box set collection, guitarist Jerry Cantrell said of the song:

Another cool song from that demo for the Crowe movie. Thinking about it now, that was a fruitful tape! We got "Would?" for the movie, part of Sap and we got started on the Dirt, so the tune itself was a good song, but we were just turning to the height of our blackness.

== Meaning ==
The song seems to be anti-censorship, making reference to then Washington state governor Booth Gardner's March 20, 1992 signing of a bill that would impose a jail term to anyone caught selling an album a judge would deem "erotic" to a minor. Prior to the signing, MTV had publicized Gardner's office phone number, bringing in over 4,000 faxed signatures (mostly against the bill). This incident is directly referenced in the song's lyric, "So they put your number on the television, Mr. Gardner/A messed up generation put the pressure on you/You're a coward," and, "Fear the voices you hear today/If you steal our choices, we'll blow you away."

== Release and reception ==
"Fear the Voices" was released as a single in 1999. "Fear the Voices" peaked at number 11 on the Billboard Mainstream Rock Tracks chart.

== Track listing ==
| No. | Title | Length |
|---|---|---|
| 1. | "Fear the Voices" | 4:58 |

== Personnel ==
- Layne Staley – lead vocals
- Jerry Cantrell – vocals, lead guitar
- Mike Starr – bass
- Sean Kinney – drums

== Charts ==
| Chart (1999) | Peak position |
|---|---|
| US Mainstream Rock Airplay (Billboard) | 11 |

== Release history ==
Release dates and formats for "Like a Stone"Release dates and formats for "Fear the Voices"
| Region | Date | Format(s) | Label(s) | Ref. |
|---|---|---|---|---|
| United States | October 11–12, 1999 | Mainstream rock; active rock; alternative radio | Columbia | |
