= Get Born Again =

Single by Alice in Chains

from the album Nothing Safe: Best of the Box
- Released: June 1, 1999
- Recorded: August 1998
- Genre: Grunge; Alternative metal
- Length: 5:28
- Label: Columbia
- Songwriters: Layne Staley; Jerry Cantrell
- Producers: Toby Wright; Alice in Chains; Dave Jerden

Alice in Chains singles chronology
| "Over Now" (1996) | "Get Born Again" (1999) | "Fear the Voices" (1999) |

Music video
- "Get Born Again" on YouTube

"Get Born Again" is a song by the American rock band Alice in Chains and, along with "Died", one of the last two songs recorded with vocalist Layne Staley before his death in 2002. The song was released as the lead single from the compilation Nothing Safe: Best of the Box (1999) on June 1, 1999. It peaked at No. 4 on the Billboard Mainstream Rock Tracks chart, and at No. 12 on the Modern Rock Tracks chart. "Get Born Again" was nominated for the Grammy Award for Best Hard Rock Performance in 2000. The song was also included on the compilation albums Music Bank (1999) and The Essential Alice in Chains (2006).

== Origin and recording ==
The music was written by guitarist Jerry Cantrell for what would eventually become his second solo album, Degradation Trip. However, after he showed the song to Alice in Chains vocalist Layne Staley, Staley decided to write lyrics to the song, and it was eventually recorded with Alice in Chains in 1998.

In interview with radio program Rockline in 1999, Staley stated that the song is based around "religious hypocrisy".

In the liner notes of 1999's Music Bank box set collection, Jerry Cantrell said of the song:

We tried to work with Dave Jerden again and that didn't work out for various uncomfortable reasons. We had tracked with him in L.A., and then we went up to Seattle with Toby Wright. So considering it was done in different states with different producers, I think it turned out to be pretty classic Alice.

Also of note was Staley's condition while recording the song which was made known by Dirt producer Dave Jerden—who was originally chosen by the band for the production—who said "Staley weighed eighty pounds...and was white as a ghost." Cantrell refused to comment on the singer's appearance, simply replying "I'd rather not comment on that…", and band manager Susan Silver said she hadn't seen the singer since "last year".

== Release and reception ==
"Get Born Again" was released to radio stations on June 1, 1999. The single peaked at number four on the Billboard Mainstream Rock Tracks chart, and at number 12 on the Billboard Modern Rock Tracks chart. The song was nominated for the Grammy Award for Best Hard Rock Performance in 2000.

The song is sometimes credited with being one of the band's most bleak singles. James Hunter of Rolling Stone described the song as "a drone lifted by ominous chorales, hardened by slashing guitars and set off with Layne Staley intoning, 'Just repeat a couple lies.'"

== Music video ==
The music video for "Get Born Again" was released in 1999 and was directed by Paul Fedor. The video shows a disfigured insane scientist trying to duplicate his own version of the band. Footage of Staley, Cantrell, and drummer Sean Kinney was pulled from the "Sea of Sorrow" video and bassist Mike Inez from the "What the Hell Have I" video. The video is available on the home video release Music Bank: The Videos.

== Track listing ==
| No. | Title | Length |
|---|---|---|
| 1. | "Get Born Again" (Edit) | 4:26 |
| 2. | "Get Born Again" | 5:26 |
| 3. | "Angry Chair" (live) | 4:24 |
| 4. | "Man in the Box" (live) | 5:10 |

== Personnel ==
- Layne Staley – lead vocals
- Jerry Cantrell – guitar, vocals
- Mike Inez – bass
- Sean Kinney – drums

== Charts ==
| Chart (1999) | Peak position |
|---|---|
| US Bubbling Under Hot 100 (Billboard) | 6 |
| US Mainstream Rock (Billboard) | 4 |
| US Alternative Airplay (Billboard) | 12 |
