= Died (song) =

1999 song by Alice in Chains

Song by Alice in Chains

from the album Music Bank
- Released: October 26, 1999
- Recorded: October 1998
- Length: 5:58
- Label: Columbia
- Composer(s): Jerry Cantrell
- Lyricist(s): Layne Staley
- Producer(s): Alice in Chains

"Died" is a song by Alice in Chains and the final one recorded with vocalist Layne Staley before his death in 2002. The song was included on the compilation albums Music Bank (1999) and The Essential Alice in Chains (2006).

== Origin and recording ==
The music to the song, along with the better known "Get Born Again", was originally written by guitarist Jerry Cantrell in 1998 for what would eventually become his second solo album, Degradation Trip. However, the song was shown to vocalist Layne Staley, who ultimately wrote lyrics for it and recorded it with the band in 1998. In the liner notes of 1999's Music Bank box set collection, Jerry Cantrell said of the song:

I wish we'd have got a bit more work on that one. It's more "Alice in a Jam Room", it's not as finished as "[Get] Born Again". It's vicious, it's got teeth, it doesn't have many overdubs and it's maybe a purer, rawer form of what Alice is. It isn't pretty and that's not a bad thing at all.

== Personnel ==
- Layne Staley – lead vocals
- Jerry Cantrell – guitars, vocals
- Mike Inez – bass
- Sean Kinney – drums, percussion
