= Nothing Safe: Best of the Box =

Greatest hits album by Alice in Chains
- Released: June 29, 1999
- Recorded: 1989–1998
- Genre: Alternative metal; grunge; alternative rock; heavy metal
- Length: 62:18
- Label: Columbia
- Producer: Alice in Chains; Alex Coletti; Dave Jerden; Rick Parashar; Tony Wilson; Toby Wright; Peter Fletcher

Alice in Chains chronology
Unplugged (1996)	Nothing Safe: Best of the Box (1999)	Music Bank (1999)

Singles from Nothing Safe: Best of the Box
- 1. "Get Born Again" Released: June 1, 1999

Nothing Safe: Best of the Box is the first greatest hits album by the American rock band Alice in Chains. It was released on June 29, 1999, on Columbia Records. The previously unreleased track "Get Born Again" was released as a single to promote the album and peaked at No. 4 on Billboard's Mainstream Rock Tracks chart, and at No. 12 on the Modern Rock Tracks chart. "Get Born Again" was also nominated for the Grammy Award for Best Hard Rock Performance in 2000.

== Overview ==
The album is the first of Alice in Chains's best-of albums, and also served as a sampler for their Music Bank box set. Nothing Safe contains newly remastered tracks from previous albums Facelift, Sap, Dirt, Jar of Flies, Alice in Chains and Unplugged, as well as the previously unreleased track "Get Born Again", recorded between September and October 1998.

Despite the "Best of the Box" album subtitle, this compilation includes several tracks not found on the Music Bank box set.

The demo version of "We Die Young" was previously unreleased and did not appear on Music Bank. This track remains exclusive to this collection.

The live version of "Rooster" found here was also previously unreleased, and similarly did not appear on Music Bank. However, this track was re-released in 2000 on the compilation, Live.

The remastered, "unplugged" version of "Got Me Wrong" was also omitted from Music Bank.

The version of "What the Hell Have I" that appears here is the original version mixed by Andy Wallace, not the version remixed by Toby Wright that appears on Music Bank.

The newly remastered version of "Again" that is found on Nothing Safe was also left off of the Music Bank compilation in favor of a techno/electronic dance remix of the song called "Again (Tattoo Of Pain Mix)".

Unlike the version found on Music Bank, "Iron Gland" is featured with the beginning drum found on the Dirt track "Dam That River".

Because of these differences, many fans consider Nothing Safe to be a companion piece to the Music Bank box set.

A Best Buy-exclusive issue of the CD included a bonus disc in a cardboard sleeve, with live versions of "Angry Chair" and "Man in the Box".

== Release and reception ==
Professional ratings
Review scores
Source	Rating
AllMusic	4/5 stars
Metal Hammer	8/10
Rolling Stone	3.5/5 stars

The album was certified platinum by the RIAA, and the revenue generated from the album was used to fund the Music Bank box set.

The album has received mainly positive reviews, with critics praising the compilation's inclusion of rare material, along with the band's hits. AllMusic staff writer Steve Huey gave the album a four star rating writing "The package is not unattractive, since nearly all the hits are present in some form; also included are the new song "Get Born Again" and the better of the group's two contributions to the Last Action Hero soundtrack, "What the Hell Have I."

Bill Adams of Ground Control Magazine, reviewing Alice in Chains' discography, wrote, "To its credit, Nothing Safe is a solid compilation of odds, ends, live tracks, studio cuts, soundtrack appearances and rarities, which serves its purpose for giving 'in-passing' fans a pretty enjoyable set".

== Track listing ==
All tracks written by Jerry Cantrell, except where noted.

No.	Title	Writer(s)	Original album	Length
1.	"Get Born Again"	Cantrell; Layne Staley	previously unreleased	5:26
2.	"We Die Young" (demo)		previously unreleased	2:28
3.	"Man in the Box"	Staley; Cantrell; Michael Starr; Sean Kinney	Facelift (1990)	4:46
4.	"Them Bones"		Dirt (1992)	2:30
5.	"Iron Gland"		Dirt	0:43
6.	"Angry Chair"	Staley	Dirt	4:46
7.	"Down in a Hole"		Dirt	5:37
8.	"Rooster" (live)		previously unreleased in North America	6:46
9.	"Got Me Wrong"		MTV Unplugged (1996)	4:24
10.	"No Excuses"		Jar of Flies (1994)	4:15
11.	"I Stay Away"	Cantrell; Staley; Mike Inez	Jar of Flies	4:14
12.	"What the Hell Have I"		Last Action Hero: Music from the Original Motion Picture (1993)	3:57
13.	"Grind"		Alice in Chains (1995)	4:44
14.	"Again"	Cantrell; Staley	Alice in Chains	4:04
15.	"Would?"		Dirt	3:28
Total length:				62:18

Notes

- "Man in the Box" is credited to Staley/Cantrell/Starr/Kinney in the album's liner notes, despite only being credited to Staley and Cantrell in the liner notes to Facelift.
- "Rooster" is not present on the iTunes edition.

== Personnel ==
Alice in Chains

- Jerry Cantrell – lead and rhythm guitar, backing vocals, lead vocals on "Grind", co-lead vocals on "Would?"; production (2, 4–7, 9–15)
- Layne Staley – lead vocals, rhythm guitar on "Angry Chair"; production (2, 4–7, 9–15)
- Sean Kinney – drums; production (2, 4–7, 9–15)
- Mike Starr – bass (tracks 2–8, 15); production (2, 4–7, 15)
- Mike Inez – bass (tracks 1, 9–14); production (9–14)

Additional musician

- Tom Araya – vocals on "Iron Gland"

Production

- Dave Jerden – producer (1, 3–7), engineer (3), mixing (3–7, 15)
- Toby Wright – producer (1, 9, 13, 14), engineer (1, 9–14), mixing (1, 9–11, 13, 14)
- Rick Parashar – producer (2)
- Tony Wilson – producer (8)
- Bryan Carlstrom – engineer (1, 4–7, 15)
- Ronnie S. Champagne – additional engineering (3)
- Mike Walter – engineer (8)
- John Harris – engineer (9)
- Tom Nellen – engineer (13, 14)
- Andy Wallace – mixing (12)
- Stephen Marcussen – mastering
- Peter Fletcher – compilation producer
- Rocky Schenck – photography
- Mary Maurer – art direction, design
- Danny Clinch – photography
- Marty Temme – photography
- Brandy Flower – design
- Young Sun Lim – artwork, art direction
- Chris McCann – photography

== Chart positions ==
=== Album ===
Chart (1999)	Position
US Billboard 200	20
Top Internet Albums	17

=== Singles ===
Year	Single	Peak chart positions		
Year	Single	US Bubbling	US Main	US Mod
1999	"Get Born Again"^{[I]}	6	4	12

- I Peaked on the Bubbling Under Hot 100 Singles chart, a 25-song extension to the original Billboard Hot 100 chart.

== Certifications ==
Region	Certification	Certified units/sales
United Kingdom (BPI)	Silver	60,000^{‡}
United States (RIAA)	Platinum	1,000,000^{^}
^{^} Shipments figures based on certification alone.^{‡} Sales+streaming figures based on certification alone.
