= Would? =

1992 single by Alice in Chains

- CD variant of international retail limited edition EP

Single by Alice in Chains

from the album Singles: Original Motion Picture Soundtrack and Dirt
- Released: June 8, 1992
- Recorded: 1992
- Genre: Grunge; alternative metal
- Length: 3:27
- Label: Columbia
- Songwriter: Jerry Cantrell
- Producers: Alice in Chains; Rick Parashar

Alice in Chains singles chronology
"Sea of Sorrow" (1991)	"Would?" (1992)	"Them Bones" (1992)

Music video
- "Would?" on YouTube

"Would?" is a song by the American rock band Alice in Chains from the Singles: Original Motion Picture Soundtrack (1992) and their second studio album, Dirt (1992). Columbia Records serviced the song to US radio on June 8, 1992. It was written by guitarist and vocalist Jerry Cantrell as a tribute to his friend Andrew Wood, lead vocalist of Mother Love Bone, who died in 1990. Cantrell sings the verses of the song, while Layne Staley sings the chorus.

The song first appeared on the soundtrack to the 1992 film Singles—where the members of Alice in Chains make a cameo appearance—and later appeared on the band's second studio album Dirt, also released in 1992. "Would?" was released as a single and peaked at No. 31 on Billboard's Mainstream Rock Tracks chart in 1992, at No. 19 in 1996, and in 2019 the song peaked at No. 15 on the Hot Rock Songs chart after it was featured in the trailer for the season 2 of the Netflix show The Punisher. The song was included on the compilation albums Nothing Safe: Best of the Box (1999), Music Bank (1999), Greatest Hits (2001), and The Essential Alice in Chains (2006). An acoustic version performed on Alice in Chains' MTV Unplugged in 1996 was released in a live album and DVD. In 2009, "Would?" was named the 88th Best Hard Rock Song of All Time by VH1.

== Lyrics ==
The song, written by guitarist/co-vocalist Jerry Cantrell, concerns the late lead singer of Mother Love Bone, Andrew Wood, who died of a heroin overdose in 1990. It was produced, engineered, and mixed by Rick Parashar.

In the liner notes of 1999's Music Bank box set collection, Jerry Cantrell said of the song:

I was thinking a lot about Andrew Wood at the time. We always had a great time when we did hang out, much like Chris Cornell and I do. There was never really a serious moment or conversation, it was all fun. Andy was a hilarious guy, full of life and it was really sad to lose him. But I always hate people who judge the decisions others make. So it was also directed towards people who pass judgments.

Reflecting on the song in a 2017 interview, Cantrell said:

A really significant thing for all of us - was kind of a heavier foreshadowing of some things that would directly affect us and our friends - was the death of Andy Wood. That song was me thinking about him like we all did, and trying to put that down and just kind of write a little ode for him. Because he wasn't there, and everything was taking off... It was a nice thing to be able to use that song, it was very poignant I thought, because we kind of carried him with us.

== Release and reception ==
Columbia Records serviced "Would?" to US radio on June 8, 1992. It coincided with the release of the movie Singles in which the band members made a cameo appearance. The song peaked at number 31 on the Billboard Mainstream Rock Tracks chart. The song was released as a single in the UK on January 11, 1993, and reached the Top 20 in the UK and the Top 40 in the Netherlands (their highest-charting song in both countries). It is one of the band's best-known songs.

Steve Huey of AllMusic said that the song is "a touch more melancholy than many of the group's best-known rockers" and "one of the band's most fully realized individual moments." James Hunter of Rolling Stone called the song "a Seattle song that in 1999 evokes no grunge nostalgia. It's timeless, one of the most stylish singles of the decade, the work of a band which understands that life gets way out of hand but that first-rate rock recordings can't."

The song was named one of the top tracks of the 1990s by Pitchfork Media in 2010. In 2014, the entertainment magazine Paste ranked the song number three on its list of the 50 Best Grunge Songs.

On January 10, 2019, "Would?" was featured in the trailer for the season 2 of the Marvel/Netflix superhero show The Punisher. Following the release of the trailer, the song peaked at No. 15 on Billboard's Hot Rock Songs chart in the week of January 26, 2019.

== Music video ==
The music video for "Would?" was released in 1992 and was co-directed by Cameron Crowe and Josh Taft. The music video won the award for Best Video from a Film at the 1993 MTV Video Music Awards. The video is available on the home video release Music Bank: The Videos.

== Live performances ==
Alice in Chains performed an acoustic version of "Would?" for its appearance on MTV Unplugged in 1996, and the song was included on the Unplugged live album and home video release. Live performances of the song can also be found on the "Heaven Beside You" single and the live album, Live.

== Cover versions ==
The song was covered by Opeth on their single "Burden", a song from their 2008 album Watershed.

Breaking Benjamin also covered the song in February 2020, with guest vocalist Gavin Rossdale of Bush taking Cantrell's parts.

Metallica and Korn both covered the song at MoPOP's Founders Award fundraiser in December 2020.

== Track listing ==
All tracks are written by Jerry Cantrell, except "Man in the Box" written by Layne Staley and Cantrell.

No.	Title	Length
1.	"Would?"	3:27
2.	"Man in the Box"	4:46
3.	"Brother"	4:27
4.	"Right Turn"	3:17

== Personnel ==
Alice in Chains

- Layne Staley – lead vocals
- Jerry Cantrell – guitar, co-lead vocals
- Mike Starr – bass
- Sean Kinney – drums

Production

- Produced by Alice in Chains and Rick Parashar
- Engineered by Bryan Carlstrom, assisted by Annette Cisneros and Ulrich Wild
- Mixed by Dave Jerden, assisted by Annette Cisneros
- Mastered by Steve Hall and Eddy Schreyer

== Charts ==
Weekly chart performance for "Would?"
Chart (1992–93)	Peak position
Australia (ARIA)	69
Australia Alternative (ARIA)	10
European Hot 100 Singles (Music & Media)	77
Finland (Suomen virallinen lista)	17
Netherlands (Dutch Top 40)	31
Netherlands (Single Top 100)	33
UK Singles (Official Charts)	19
US Mainstream Rock (Billboard)	31

2019 chart performance for "Would?"
Chart (2019)	Peak position
US Hot Rock & Alternative Songs (Billboard)	15

Weekly chart performance for MTV Unplugged version
Chart (1996)	Peak position
Canada Rock/Alternative (RPM)	21
US Mainstream Rock (Billboard)	19

== Certifications ==
Region	Certification	Certified units/sales
New Zealand (RMNZ)	2× Platinum	60,000^{‡}
United Kingdom (BPI)	Silver	200,000^{‡}
United States (RIAA)	2× Platinum	2,000,000^{‡}
^{‡} Sales+streaming figures based on certification alone.

== Release history ==
Release dates and formats for "Would?"
Region	Date	Format(s)	Label(s)	Ref.
United States	June 8, 1992	Radio	Columbia	
United Kingdom	January 11, 1993	7-inch vinyl; 12-inch vinyl; CD	Columbia	
Australia	February 28, 1993	CD; cassette	Columbia	
