= Music Bank (album) =

Box set by Alice in Chains
- Released: October 26, 1999
- Recorded: 1988–1998
- Genres: Alternative metal; grunge; alternative rock; heavy metal
- Length: 220:10
- Label: Columbia
- Producers: Peter Fletcher; Alice in Chains

Alice in Chains chronology
Nothing Safe: Best of the Box (1999)	Music Bank (1999)	Live (2000)

Singles from Music Bank
- 1. "Fear the Voices" Released: October 11, 1999

Professional ratings
Review scores
Source	Rating
AllMusic	4/5 stars
The Rolling Stone Album Guide	2.5/5 stars

Music Bank is a box set of a large variety of songs by the American rock band Alice in Chains. It was released on October 26, 1999, on Columbia Records. The box set includes previously unreleased demos, hit singles, remixes, alternative versions and four new songs, "Fear the Voices", "Get Born Again", "Lying Season", and "Died". The track "Fear the Voices" was released as a single to promote the box set. Music Bank peaked at No. 123 on the Billboard 200 chart.

== Overview ==
The box set consists of three music discs, 48 songs, including rarities, previously unreleased demos and mixes by the band, and previously released and remastered material from their albums Facelift, Sap, Dirt, Jar of Flies, Alice in Chains and Unplugged and a CD-ROM disc containing various multimedia.

In 1998, vocalist Layne Staley reunited with Alice in Chains to record two new songs, "Get Born Again" and "Died". Originally written for Jerry Cantrell's solo album Degradation Trip, the songs were released on Music Bank.

== Track listing ==
Disc one
No.	Title	Writer(s)	Length
1.	"Get Born Again" (from Nothing Safe – The Best of the Box)	Layne Staley, Jerry Cantrell	5:24
2.	"I Can't Have You Blues" (1988 demo, previously unreleased)	Cantrell	4:01
3.	"Whatcha Gonna Do" (1988 demo, previously unreleased)	Cantrell, Staley	2:54
4.	"Social Parasite" (1988 demo, previously unreleased)	Cantrell	4:22
5.	"Queen of the Rodeo" (Live 1990, previously unreleased)	Staley, Jett Silver	4:39
6.	"Bleed the Freak" (1988 demo, previously unreleased)	Cantrell	3:32
7.	"Killing Yourself" (1988 demo, previously unreleased)	Cantrell, Staley	2:38
8.	"We Die Young" (from Facelift)	Cantrell	2:32
9.	"Man in the Box" (from Facelift)	Cantrell, Staley	4:46
10.	"Sea of Sorrow" (1988 demo, previously unreleased)	Cantrell	5:20
11.	"I Can't Remember" (from Facelift)	Staley, Cantrell	3:43
12.	"Love, Hate, Love" (from Facelift)	Staley, Cantrell	6:26
13.	"It Ain't Like That" (from Facelift)	Cantrell, Starr, Kinney	4:38
14.	"Confusion" (from Facelift)	Staley, Cantrell, Starr	5:44
15.	"Rooster" (1991 demo, previously unreleased)	Cantrell	5:47
16.	"Right Turn" (from Sap)	Cantrell	3:14
17.	"Got Me Wrong" (from Sap)	Cantrell	4:10
Total length:			73:50

Disc two
No.	Title	Writer(s)	Length
1.	"Rain When I Die" (from Dirt)	Cantrell, Staley, Kinney, Starr	6:02
2.	"Fear the Voices" (Previously unreleased)	Starr, Cantrell, Staley	4:58
3.	"Them Bones" (from Dirt)	Cantrell	2:29
4.	"Dam That River" (from Dirt)	Cantrell	3:09
5.	"Sickman" (from Dirt)	Cantrell, Staley	5:30
6.	"Rooster" (from Dirt)	Cantrell	6:14
7.	"Junkhead" (1992 demo, previously unreleased)	Cantrell, Staley	5:11
8.	"Dirt" (from Dirt)	Cantrell, Staley	5:17
9.	"God Smack" (from Dirt)	Cantrell, Staley	3:51
10.	"Iron Gland" (unlisted track from Dirt)	Cantrell	0:43
11.	"Angry Chair" (from Dirt)	Staley	4:47
12.	"Lying Season" (Previously unreleased)	Staley, Cantrell	3:21
13.	"Would?" (from Dirt)	Cantrell	3:28
14.	"Brother" (from Sap, alternate mix without Ann Wilson's vocals)	Cantrell	4:27
15.	"Am I Inside" (from Sap)	Cantrell, Staley	5:08
16.	"I Stay Away" (from Jar of Flies)	Staley, Mike Inez, Cantrell	4:14
17.	"No Excuses" (from Jar of Flies)	Cantrell	4:16
Total length:			73:06

Disc three
No.	Title	Writer(s)	Length
1.	"Down in a Hole" (from Dirt)	Cantrell	5:38
2.	"Hate to Feel" (from Dirt)	Staley	5:16
3.	"What the Hell Have I" (Remix, original from Music from the Original Motion Picture – Last Action Hero)	Cantrell	3:57
4.	"A Little Bitter" (Remix, original from Music from the Original Motion Picture – Last Action Hero)	Staley, Cantrell, Inez, Kinney	3:52
5.	"Grind" (from Alice in Chains)	Cantrell	4:45
6.	"Again" (Tattoo of Pain Mix, previously unreleased in the United States)	Cantrell, Staley	4:02
7.	"Head Creeps" (from Alice in Chains)	Staley	6:27
8.	"God Am" (from Alice in Chains)	Staley, Cantrell, Kinney, Inez	4:07
9.	"Frogs" (from Alice in Chains)	Staley, Cantrell, Kinney, Inez	8:17
10.	"Heaven Beside You" (from Alice in Chains)	Cantrell, Inez	5:29
11.	"Nutshell" (from MTV Unplugged)	Staley, Cantrell, Inez, Kinney,	4:29
12.	"The Killer Is Me" (from MTV Unplugged)	Cantrell	5:18
13.	"Over Now" (from MTV Unplugged)	Cantrell, Kinney	5:53
14.	"Died" (Previously unreleased)	Staley, Cantrell	5:58
Total length:			73:28

== Chart positions ==
=== Album ===
Chart (1999)	Peak position
US Billboard 200	123
Top Internet Albums	12

=== Singles ===
Year	Single	Chart	Peak position
1999	"Fear the Voices"	US Mainstream Rock	11

== Personnel ==
Alice in Chains

- Layne Staley – vocals, guitar ("Angry Chair", "Hate to Feel", "Head Creeps")
- Jerry Cantrell – guitar, vocals, liner notes pages 48–53, compilation title, cover concept
- Mike Inez – bass (disc 1: track 1, disc 2: tracks 16 & 17, disc 3: tracks 3–11, 13–14), guitar (disc 3: track 12)
- Sean Kinney – drums, liner notes (inner box), concept, cover concept, supervisor, direction, production concept
- Mike Starr – bass (disc 1: tracks 2–17, disc 2: tracks 1–15, disc 3: tracks 1–2)

Additional personnel

- Mark Arm – vocals on "Right Turn"
- Jeff Beck – graphic design
- Chris Cornell – vocals on "Right Turn"
- Peter Cronin – photography
- Paul Hernandez – photography
- Dennis Keeley – photography
- Stephen Marcussen – mastering
- Scott Olson – guitar (disc 3: tracks 11 & 13), bass (disc 3: track 12)
- Ann Wilson – vocals on "Am I Inside"
- Jonathan Meyer – graphic assistant
- Peter Fletcher – compilation producer, foreword
- Neil Zlozower – photography
- Jeffrey Mayer – photography
- Catherine Wessel – photography
- Karen Moskowitz – photography
- Michael Simpson – package supervision
- Mary Maurer – art direction, design
- Chris Cuffaro – photography
- Doug Erb – design
- Danny Clinch – photography
- Steffan Chirazi – liner notes
- Marty Temme – photography
- Brandy Flower – design
- Christopher Wray-McCann – photography
