= Mike Starr (musician) =

American bassist (1966–2011)

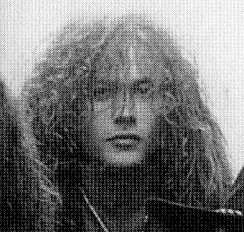
- Starr in 1988

Background information
- Born: Michael Christopher Starr; April 4, 1966; Honolulu, Hawaii, U.S.
- Died: March 8, 2011 (aged 44) Salt Lake City, Utah, U.S.
- Genres: Alternative metal; grunge; heavy metal; alternative rock
- Occupation: Musician
- Instrument: Bass
- Years active: 1983–1993; 2010–2011
- Formerly of: Alice in Chains; Sun Red Sun; Gypsy Rose; Sato; Days of the New

Michael Christopher Starr (April 4, 1966 – March 8, 2011) was an American musician best known as the original bassist for the rock band Alice in Chains, with which he played from the band's formation in 1987 until January 1993. He was also a member of Sato, Gypsy Rose, Sun Red Sun, and Days of the New.

Starr had a long history of substance abuse, including addictions to both heroin and synthetic opioids. In 2011, he died of a prescription drug overdose at the age of 44.

== Career ==
In 1983, Starr formed the heavy metal band Sato. Their song "Leather Warrior" appeared on Northwest Metalfest, a compilation album featuring various metal acts released in 1984 by Seattle label Ground Zero Records. Starr briefly joined another band, Gypsy Rose, which included early Alice N' Chains producer Tim Branom on lead vocals and his future bandmate Jerry Cantrell on guitar. Starr and Cantrell left Gypsy Rose and started working in other bands. Cantrell wanted to form a new band and his roommate, Layne Staley, gave him the phone number of Melinda Starr, the girlfriend of drummer Sean Kinney, so that Cantrell could talk to him. Kinney and his girlfriend went to the Music Bank rehearsal studios and listened to Cantrell's demos. Cantrell mentioned that they needed a bass player to jam with them and he had someone in mind: Mike Starr, with whom Cantrell had played in the band Gypsy Rose in Burien. Kinney pointed at his girlfriend and said: "that's weird cause that's his sister". Kinney called Starr and a few days later he jammed with him and Cantrell at the Music Bank. However, the band did not have a singer. The trio then began staging what Cantrell and Kinney later said were fake auditions in order to coax Staley into joining their band. Eventually, Staley quit the other bands he was performing with at that time and joined their band on a full-time basis.

This band gained attention in the Seattle area playing under several different monikers before they eventually settled on the name Alice in Chains, which they had taken from Staley's previous band Alice N' Chains. The band was later signed to a record deal with Columbia Records and enjoyed extensive success via record sales and radio play in the grunge movement of the early 1990s.

Starr parted ways with Alice in Chains just as the band was achieving its greatest commercial success while touring behind the album Dirt in 1993. According to the band's lead vocalist Layne Staley in a February 1994 Rolling Stone article, Starr's departure from Alice in Chains stemmed from "just a difference in priorities. We wanted to continue intense touring and press, Mike was ready to go home." Starr, however, contradicted this account on an episode of Celebrity Rehab, claiming that he was kicked out of the band due to his escalating drug use.

Starr later was hired to play bass for the band Sun Red Sun, which featured Ray Gillen and Bobby Rondinelli, both former members of Black Sabbath. The project was cut short by Gillen's death in 1993. After the disbandment of Sun Red Sun, Starr stopped playing music professionally until 2010, as his drug use spiraled out of control.

In 2010, Starr recorded a cover of Sonic Youth's "Kool Thing" with singer Leiana. The song premiered on radio during Starr's last interview, which was for Dr. Drew Pinsky's show Loveline aired on February 16, 2010. That same year, Starr was reportedly putting together a new band which had secured a spot opening for the band Days of the New.

== Struggles with substance abuse ==
Starr claimed that Layne Staley saved his life when Alice in Chains were on tour in January 1993 with Nirvana in Brazil. According to Starr, both Staley and Kurt Cobain gave him shots of heroin one night on tour. Right after Staley had shot him up again, Starr collapsed, but Staley revived him by giving him CPR. Starr recalled waking up to find Staley hysterically crying.

In April 1994, Starr was arrested for drug possession at Houston International Airport. As he was trying to check in for a flight to Los Angeles with a suitcase that he stole from the baggage claim area, authorities at the airport searched him and found he was carrying marijuana. He was sentenced to 30 days in a jail in Houston. Starr admitted to stealing the luggage after he discovered that his own luggage was damaged.

In an interview on VH1's Celebrity Rehab with Dr. Drew with Layne Staley's mother, Nancy McCallum, Starr said that he spent time with Staley on April 4, 2002 (the day before Staley died). Starr claimed that Staley was very sick, refused to call 9-1-1 and would sever their friendship if Starr called. The two ex-bandmates briefly argued, and Starr stormed out. Starr stated that Staley called after him as he left: "Not like this, don't leave like this". Staley is believed to have died a day later, on April 5; Starr was the last person known to have seen Staley alive. The interview ended with Starr apologizing to McCallum for not calling 911. McCallum was insistent that neither she nor anyone in her family blamed Starr for Staley's death. She also told Starr: "Layne would forgive you. He'd say, 'Hey, I did this. Not you.'" Starr still blamed himself for Staley's death. Starr kept this story a secret until his appearance on Celebrity Rehab in February 2010. "I wish I hadn't been high on benzodiazepine [that night], I wouldn't have just walked out the door", Starr said. Both Jerry Cantrell and Sean Kinney criticized the show Celebrity Rehab, calling it "disgusting". However, they stopped short of criticizing their former bandmate and expressed hope that Starr would turn his life around.

Starr was convicted of felony drug possession in 2003, and a bench warrant was issued on August 25, 2003, when he failed to appear for sentencing.

Also in 2003, Starr and his father, John Starr, were arrested for allegedly doing drugs on a Southwest flight from Los Angeles to Salt Lake City. John Starr said he was taking his son to drug rehabilitation in Seattle at the time. Investigators found the Starrs to be in possession of a syringe and balloons filled with heroin. Mike Starr had other drugs in his pockets, and the Starrs had drug paraphernalia in their luggage. Starr claimed his father forced him to shoot up on the plane.

In April 2005, Starr was arrested in Seattle for vandalism after he was caught pulling the hood ornament off a car. It was reported that his past charges included DUI, reckless driving, and various drug charges.

On September 28, 2009, Starr was arrested in Los Angeles on drug charges. The arrest was a felony narcotics charge. He was held at the Bauchet Street Jail with bail set at $100,000.

Starr was featured in the third season of the VH1 reality television series Celebrity Rehab with Dr. Drew in 2010, which documented his treatment for methadone addiction beginning in August 2009 at the Pasadena Recovery Center. His subsequent stint staying in a sober living environment was then documented on the spinoff Sober House. He and fellow recovering addicts Mackenzie Phillips and Tom Sizemore appeared in the eighth episode of Celebrity Rehab's fourth season to provide testimonials about their recovery to that season's patients. During this appearance, Starr marked six months and seven days of sobriety.

In February 2011, Starr was arrested in Salt Lake City for investigation of drug possession and on an outstanding warrant from 2003. Starr was the passenger in a van that was pulled over for a routine traffic violation. According to jail documents, Starr was illegally in possession of prescription medication.

=== Death ===
On March 8, 2011, at 1:42 pm, police were called to a home in Salt Lake City where they found Starr's body. There were no indications of foul play, and authorities suspected Starr died of a drug overdose. A public memorial was held for Starr at Experience Music Project in Seattle on March 20, 2011. There were roughly 400 people in attendance. A private memorial was also held, which was attended by Starr's former bandmates Jerry Cantrell and Sean Kinney. Dr. Drew Pinsky has said that Starr's death was the result of "a prescription drug overdose." Drug addiction counselor Bob Forrest has described Starr and fellow Celebrity Rehab with Dr. Drew alum Jeff Conaway as having "such severe addictions."

== Tributes ==
In 2013, Alice in Chains drummer Sean Kinney added the initials "LSMS" on his drum kit, a tribute to Layne Staley and Mike Starr. Kinney explained: "There's been six people in this band and that's it", and Cantrell added, "And we're all up there".

On September 19, 2013, Jerry Cantrell paid tribute to both Starr and Layne Staley before performing the song "Nutshell" with Alice in Chains at the Rock in Rio concert in Brazil. For the show in São Paulo on September 26, the band had T-shirts of Brazil national football team with the names "Staley" and "Starr" on display on the stage. Since then, Cantrell has always paid tribute to Staley and Starr before performing "Nutshell" at concerts.

Jerry Cantrell revealed that the lyrics "Left me here so all alone, only for me to find/Hear your voice on waves we rode, echoes inside my mind/Disembodied, just a trace of what it was like then/With you here, we shared a space that's always half empty" from the song "Rainier Fog" are about Staley and Starr. The song was featured on Alice in Chains' 2018 album, Rainier Fog.

In 2015, a signature bass for Starr made by Spector was announced and released, the Euro4LX Mike Starr LE. Work on this signature model had begun before Starr's passing, and was resumed later after his family had reached out to continue it. It was available as a limited run only for 2015.

== Posthumous releases ==
In October 2017, Lost Realm Records released a 500-copy limited edition CD+DVD deluxe package of 10 songs, taken from the original master tapes and digitally remastered, and live performances by Starr's previous band Sato, titled Leather Warriors – Sato Anthology 82/86; this package was dedicated to Starr's memory. In December 2019, Lost Realm announced an upcoming 250-copy limited edition vinyl release of Leather Warriors.

== Discography ==
Alice in Chains

Year	Album details	Notes
1990	We Die Young: Released: July 1990; Label: Columbia	EP
1990	Facelift: Released: August 21, 1990; Label: Columbia	Songwriting credits on "It Ain't Like That" and "Confusion".
1992	Sap: Released: February 4, 1992; Label: Columbia	EP
1992	Dirt: Released: September 29, 1992; Label: Columbia	Songwriting credit on "Rain When I Die".
1999	Nothing Safe: Best of the Box: Released: June 29, 1999; Label: Columbia	Bass on tracks 2–8,15.
1999	Music Bank: Released: October 26, 1999; Label: Columbia	Songwriting credit on "Fear the Voices".
2000	Live: Released: December 5, 2000; Label: Columbia	Bass on tracks 1 and 2.
2001	Greatest Hits: Released: July 24, 2001; Label: Columbia	Bass on tracks 1–5.
2006	The Essential Alice in Chains: Released: September 5, 2006; Label: Columbia	Bass on Disc 1 and "Would?".

Sato

Year	Album details	Notes
2017	Leather Warriors – Sato Anthology 82/86: Released: October 9, 2017; Label: Lost Realm	Limited edition: CD+DVD: 500 copies; Vinyl: 250 copies

Other appearances

Year	Album details	Band	Notes
1984	Northwest Metalfest: Released: 1984; Label: Ground Zero Records	Sato	Bass on track 7 "Leather Warrior".
1995	Sun Red Sun: Released: 1995; Label: Angel Air Records	Sun Red Sun	Bass on tracks 1–3, 5, 6.
