= Rainier Fog (song) =

2019 single by Alice in Chains

Single by Alice in Chains

from the album Rainier Fog
- Released: February 26, 2019
- Recorded: June 12, 2017–January 12, 2018
- Studio: Studio X, Seattle, Washington; Rock Falcon, Nashville, Tennessee; Henson, Hollywood, California; Jerry Cantrell's home studio
- Length: 5:01
- Label: BMG
- Songwriter: Jerry Cantrell
- Producers: Nick Raskulinecz and Alice in Chains

Alice in Chains singles chronology
"Never Fade" (2018)	"Rainier Fog" (2019)

"Rainier Fog" is a song by the American rock band Alice in Chains. It is the fourth single and the title track to the band's sixth studio album, Rainier Fog (2018). Written by guitarist and vocalist Jerry Cantrell, the song is a tribute to the Seattle music scene and the band's former members, Layne Staley and Mike Starr, and the title was inspired by Mount Rainier, a volcano that overlooks Seattle. The single peaked at No. 20 on Billboard's Mainstream Rock chart. Excerpts from the lyrics are featured upside down on the album cover. The full lyrics to "Rainier Fog" are inscribed on the bottom plate of Jerry Cantrell's signature Dunlop Cry Baby Wah pedal, released in April 2019.

== Origin and lyrics ==
The original demo for "Rainier Fog" was recorded at vocalist/guitarist Jerry Cantrell's house in Los Angeles. Guns N' Roses bassist Duff McKagan helped Cantrell with the song, as he played bass on it. McKagan loved the riff and said to Cantrell that it was his first single, although Cantrell still didn't have lyrics for the song.

Cantrell told Rolling Stone magazine that the song is a tribute to the Seattle music scene, that launched bands such as Alice in Chains, Soundgarden, Mother Love Bone, Mudhoney, Screaming Trees and Nirvana. "This song is a little homage to all of that: where we come from, who we are, all of the triumphs, all of the tragedies, lives lived."

Cantrell told Classic Rock magazine that the lyrics "Left me here so all alone, only for me to find/Hear your voice on waves we rode, echoes inside my mind/Disembodied just a trace of what it was like then/With you here we shared a space that's always half-empty" are about former Alice in Chains members Layne Staley and Mike Starr. Both of them died from drug overdoses, in 2002 and 2011, respectively. Those lyrics are also featured upside down on the album cover. Cantrell said:

That's Layne. That's Layne and Mike. Mister Staley and Mister Starr. They're still with us. I just started writing, and it ended up being about where we come from and who we are. Honouring the home town, all of the players here and gone, and all of it. It's a personal reflection on a life lived. But not just over the shoulder – looking forwards too. Being very proud and honoured to still be doing this. Duff McKagan demoed it with me and said: 'That's your single, man!'. I hope it is one.

== Release ==
On February 5, 2019, Cantrell told The Seattle Times that he was editing the song for radio play.

The lyric video for "Rainier Fog" was released on Alice In Chains' official YouTube channel on February 26, 2019. The version of the song featured in the lyric video is lower and slower than the album version, clocking it at 5:14 minutes. On March 22, 2019, a new lyric video featuring the album version of the song was published on YouTube, and the slower version was deleted from the band's channel.

== Reception ==
Chris Familton of The Music called "Rainier Fog" a gem. He also said "less metal and more of a churning punk feel, it springs from the speakers with a surging glam rush".

Brian Ives of Loudwire said that the track "could rank among the band's best songs."

Joe Daly of Louder Sound wrote that the track "serves up a wistful look at the Seattle scene when they [Alice in Chains] first started. With its buzzing riffs and hip-shaking tempos, you can hear more Bowie than Sabbath".

== Music videos ==
On December 13, 2018, the teaser trailer for the film Black Antenna featuring "Rainier Fog" was released on Alice in Chains' official YouTube channel. The film will feature all of the 10 songs from Rainier Fog, and all of the tracks will have music videos using footage from the film.

On March 7, 2019, a music video for "Rainier Fog" was released on Alice in Chains' YouTube channel. The video was directed by Adam Mason and continues the storyline that started with the music video for the album's first single, "The One You Know". The video for "Rainier Fog" is the second episode of the sci-fi series Black Antenna, which tells the story of extraterrestrial father and daughter who drive across California in silence, speaking only telepathically. Along the way, the daughter seduces men and steals from them to help her father build an antenna so that he can send a message to their people at home. At the same time, they are being tracked down by evil forces and must avoid being killed. Written by Adam Mason and Paul Sloan, the video stars Paul Sloan, Viktoriya Dov and Eric Michael Cole. The follow-up to "Rainier Fog" is the music video for "Red Giant", released on March 21, 2019.

On May 15, 2019, an official music video for "Rainier Fog" was released on YouTube. Co-directed by Alice in Chains and Peter Darley Miller, who also directed the band's 2013 mockumentary, AIC 23, the video shows the band in Seattle raising a giant beer bottle after causing a car accident that killed its family. Drummer Sean Kinney said about the video; "In a world where things are becoming increasingly serious, with 'Rainier Fog' we have continued our long tradition of making asses out of ourselves in videos. So for all of you that were raised bottle-fed, this one is for you. Mission accomplished." Cantrell added; "We had a great time working with [director] Peter Darley Miller again. We made AIC 23 in 2013 with him, which was amazing. We had a blast making the 'Rainier Fog' music video, which continues the northwest theme of the record. We hope you enjoy it and have a laugh." The video also makes reference to the Rainier Beer commercials.

== Live performances ==
The song was performed live for the first time during Alice In Chains' concert at the Pikes Peak Center in Colorado Springs on October 18, 2018.

== Personnel ==
- Jerry Cantrell – lead guitar, backing vocals
- William DuVall – lead vocals, rhythm guitar
- Mike Inez – bass
- Sean Kinney – drums

== Charts ==
Chart (2019)	Peak position
US Mainstream Rock (Billboard)	20
