= Nico Constantine =

American musician

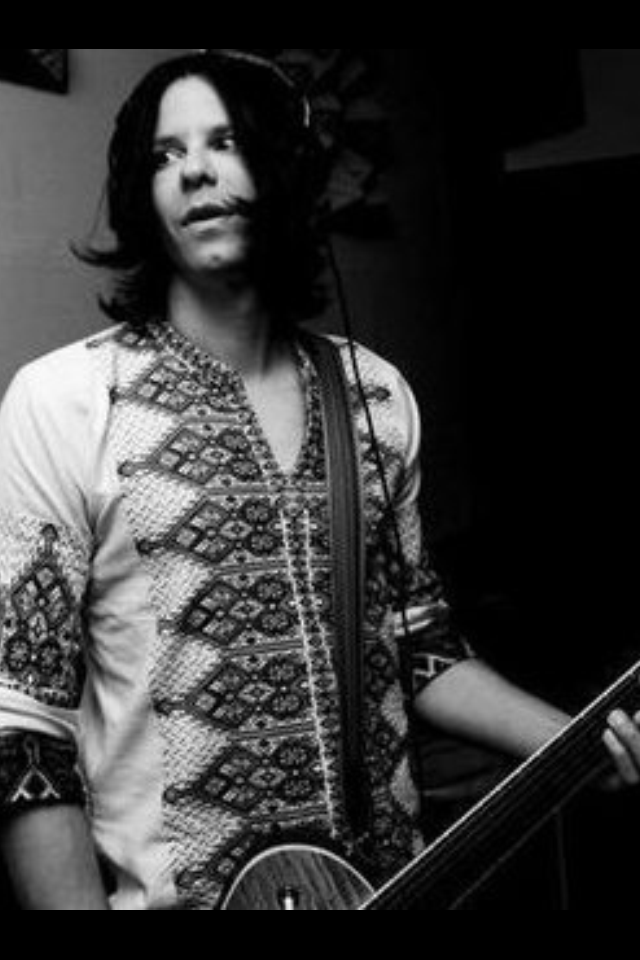
- Nico Constantine with guitar

Background information
- Genres: Rock and Roll, indie, pop
- Occupations: Musician, songwriter, producer, music director
- Instrument: Guitar
- Years active: 1996–present
- Website: institutionrecords.world

Nico Constantine is an American music director, producer, and guitarist, known for his work with Lady Gaga, Biters, Starbenders, Program the Dead, Comes with the Fall, and Madfly. He is the founder of Institution Records.

== Biography ==
=== Madfly and Comes with the Fall ===
In 1996, Constantine joined Madfly in Atlanta, Georgia, along with singer-guitarist William DuVall, drummer Bevan Davies, and bassist Jeffery Blount. In 1998, Joan Jett signed Madfly to Blackheart/Mercury Records. After releasing White Hot in the Black, the band left Blackheart/Mercury, and reformed as Comes with the Fall in 1999, with Adam Stanger replacing Jeffery Blount on bass.

Comes with the Fall recorded their self-titled album in Atlanta, a year later, before relocating to Los Angeles, California, catching the attention of Alice in Chains guitarist Jerry Cantrell. Their self-titled album was released the same year through DuVall's DVL Records.

Constantine amicably parted ways with Comes with the Fall during the first leg of the Degradation Trip tour, however, some of his writing would appear on their later studio releases, The Year Is One, The Reckoning and Beyond the Last Light. DuVall thanked Constantine along with the rest of the founding members of Comes with the Fall within the liner notes of Alice in Chains' 2009 album Black Gives Way to Blue.

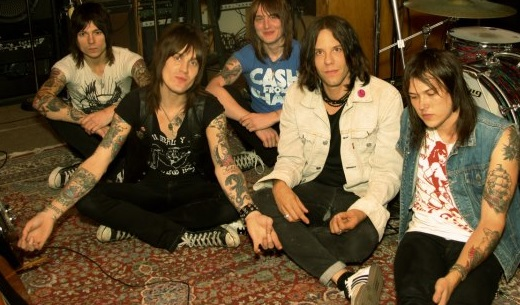
Constantine and The Biters

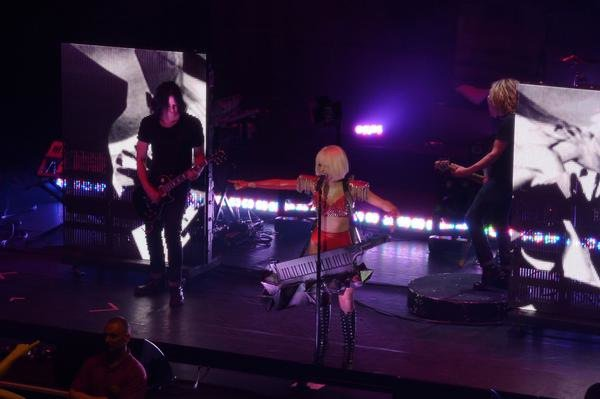
Constantine with Lady Gaga on the Fame Ball tour

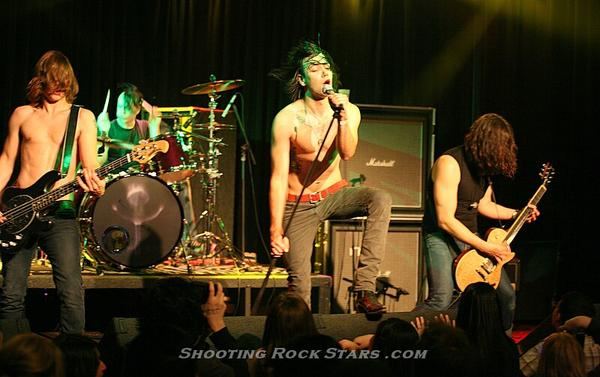
Program the Dead Live

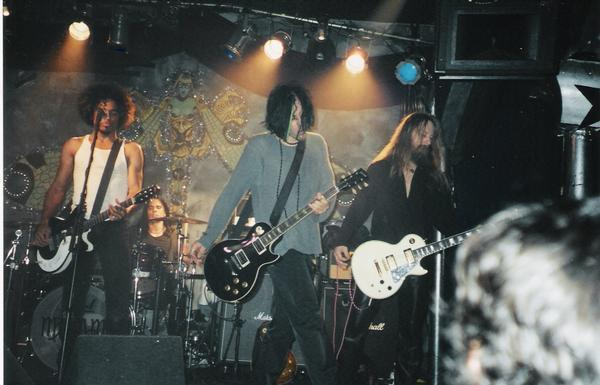
Constantine, Jerry Cantrell, and William DuVall

=== Program the Dead ===
After leaving Comes with the Fall, Constantine went on to form the band Program the Dead, along with vocalist Matt Koruba, drummer Dave Murga, and bassist Johnny McClay (later replaced by Tom Kafafian). Program the Dead was signed to Universal Motown by Andrew Kronfeld six months after forming. The band toured extensively throughout the United States, Canada and the UK sharing the stage with such bands as HIM, Mindless Self Indulgence, and the Bloodhound Gang.

=== Lady Gaga ===
In 2006, Constantine played guitar on Lady Gaga's planned album release for Island Def Jam. In 2009, he served as Lady Gaga's music director and lead guitarist, assembling her first live band for her World Tour 2009 of the Fame Ball throughout Europe, Asia, Australia, New Zealand, Israel and the United States. He also served as Gaga's music director and guitarist for her performances on Dancing with the Stars, the BBC Glastonbury Concert, the Isle of MTV Malta Special, Australia's Live at the Chapel, and many European TV specials.

=== Institution Records and Production career ===
In 2013, Constantine founded Institution Records, working with bands such as Biters, Starbenders, Rosegarden Funeral Party, and Brooklynn.

== Discography ==
Title	Release	Label	Band
Get the Silver	1996	Killing Floor Records	Madfly
White Hot in the Black	1998	Blackheart/MercuryRecords	Madfly
Comes with the Fall	2000	DVL	Comes with the Fall
Program the Dead	2005	Universal Records	Program the Dead
Ginger	2007	Sippy Cup Records	Program the Dead
Sticks & Bricks	2007 (extended play)	Sippy Cup Records	Program the Dead
Calling the Snakes	2008 (extended play)	Sippy Cup Records	Program the Dead
Dead in the City Basements: Live	2008	Sippy Cup Records	Program the Dead
Poison Arrows	2009	Full Breach Kicks	Poison Arrows
It's OK to Like Biters	2010	Underrated Records	The Biters
Dirty Pollyanna	2010	Sippy Cup Records	Dirty Pollyanna
Tell Angela	2011	Sippy Cup Records	Dirty Pollyanna
Last of a Dying Breed	2012	Pipeline Records	The Biters
Take My Hand (single)	2013	Institution Records	Brooklynn
Take My Hand (music video)	2013	Institution Records	Brooklynn
Indigo (7" A-side)	2014	Institution Records	The Biters
Brooklynn (debut EP)	2014	Institution Records	Brooklynn
Starbenders (debut EP)	2014	Institution Records	Starbenders
Free 2 B (EP)	2015	Institution Records	Brooklynn
Friends (music video)	2015	Institution Records	Brooklynn
What I Need (music video)	2015	Institution Records	Brooklynn
Powder (7")	2015	Institution Records	Starbenders
Powder (music video)	2015	Institution Records	Starbenders
Brake (single)	2015	Institution Records	Starbenders
Paper Beats Rock (single)	2015	Institution Records	Starbenders
Blood (single)	2016	Institution Records	Starbenders
Heavy Petting	2016	Institution Records	Starbenders
So High (single)	2016	Institution Records	Starbenders
Far From Heaven (single)	2017	Institution Records	Starbenders
Down and Out (single)	2017	Institution Records	Starbenders
1969 (single)	2017	Institution Records	Starbenders
Julian (EP)	2017	Institution Records	Starbenders
Japanese Rooms (EP)	2019	Institution Records	Starbenders
Death By Amplifier (single)	2019	Institution Records	Starbenders
London (single)	2019	Sumerian Records	Starbenders
Holy Mother (single)	2019	Sumerian Records	Starbenders
Love Potions	2020	Sumerian Records	Starbenders
