= Live Underground 2002 =

Live album by Comes with the Fall
- Released: May 2003
- Recorded: 2002
- Genre: Alternative rock, hard rock
- Length: 47:00
- Label: DVL
- Producer: William DuVall

Comes with the Fall chronology
Live 2002 (2002)	Live Underground 2002 (2003)	The Reckoning (2006)

Live Underground 2002 is a live DVD and documentary film by American rock band Comes with the Fall. Before its release, the band put out a companion CD featuring the same live performance titled Live 2002.

== Track listing ==
No.	Title	Writer(s)	Length
1.	"Before the Fall" (from Comes with the Fall)	Constantine/DuVall
2.	"Smashdown" (from The Year Is One)	DuVall
3.	"Murder Scene" (from The Year Is One)	Constantine/DuVall
4.	"Unhinged" (from Comes with the Fall)	Constantine/Davies/DuVall/Stanger
5.	"The Three Wishes" (from Comes with the Fall)	Constantine/DuVall
6.	"Unbreakable" (from The Year Is One)	DuVall
7.	"Strung Out on a Dream" (from The Year Is One)	DuVall
8.	"So Divine" (from The Year Is One)	DuVall
9.	"Symptom of the Universe" (song by Black Sabbath from album Sabotage)	Butler/Iommi/Osboure/Ward

== Personnel ==
Comes with the Fall

- Bevan Davies – drums
- William DuVall – vocals, guitar
- Adam Stanger – bass guitar

Production

- Christopher Horvath – engineering
- Russ Fowler – mixing
- Alex Lowe – mastering
- Josh Paul – live sound engineering
- William DuVall – production
