= Live 2002 =

Live 2002 may refer to:

- Live 2002 (Lara Fabian album)
- Live 2002 (Comes with the Fall album)
