= Rainier Fog =

Studio album by Alice in Chains
- Released: August 24, 2018
- Recorded: June 12, 2017 – January 12, 2018
- Studio: Studio X in Seattle; Dark Horse Studios/Rock Falcon Studio in Franklin, Tennessee; Jerry Cantrell's home studio in Los Angeles; Henson Recording Studios in Los Angeles; JHOC Studio in Pasadena
- Genre: Grunge; hard rock; sludge metal; doom metal
- Length: 53:21
- Label: BMG
- Producer: Nick Raskulinecz; Alice in Chains

Alice in Chains chronology
The Devil Put Dinosaurs Here (2013)	Rainier Fog (2018)

Singles from Rainier Fog
- 1. "The One You Know" Released: May 3, 2018; 2. "So Far Under" Released: June 27, 2018; 3. "Never Fade" Released: August 10, 2018; 4. "Rainier Fog" Released: February 26, 2019

Rainier Fog is the sixth studio album by American rock band Alice in Chains, released on August 24, 2018, through BMG, the band's first release on the label. The title was inspired by Mount Rainier, a volcano that overlooks the Seattle-Tacoma metropolitan area, and the title track is a tribute to the Seattle music scene. This is the band's third album with William DuVall sharing lead vocals with Jerry Cantrell, and the first Alice in Chains album in 22 years to be recorded in their hometown of Seattle. The album was partially recorded at Seattle's Studio X, the same studio where the band recorded their 1995 self-titled album. Rainier Fog is also Alice in Chains' third collaboration with producer Nick Raskulinecz, marking their first time recording three full-length albums with the same producer.

The tracks "The One You Know", "So Far Under", "Never Fade" and "Rainier Fog" were released as singles to promote the album. A 10-part sci-fi web series titled Black Antenna was released in 2019 as a companion piece to the album. A full-length feature film with the same title was also announced, but as of 2020 no release date has been set.

Rainier Fog debuted at No. 12 on the Billboard 200 chart. It also debuted at No. 1 on Billboard's Top Rock Albums, Alternative Albums and Hard Rock Albums charts. The album became Alice in Chains' first top 10 in the UK, peaking at No. 9. Rainier Fog was nominated for a Grammy Award for Best Rock Album in 2019. It won a 2018 Metal Storm Award for Best Alternative Metal Album.

== Background and recording ==
In August 2015, bassist Mike Inez said in an interview that Alice in Chains had been "throwing around riffs for a new record" and "taking it nice and slow." Asked if the band had been recording any new material during an interview with Detroit radio station WRIF in June 2016, vocalist William DuVall stated that was still early and the band would probably talk about that over the next few months, after they finished touring with Guns N' Roses. DuVall also talked about Alice in Chains' songwriting process and how it has evolved over the years:

"We make a habit of kind of starting pretty much with a clean slate every time we've gone in. And that challenges you, so we'll have to see how it manifests this time. But we're not there yet."

In January 2017, Mike Inez stated in an interview that the band had begun work on a new album. Speaking with Good Celebrity on May 1, 2017, guitarist and vocalist Jerry Cantrell revealed that Alice in Chains would return to Studio X in Seattle to record a new album in the following month. Studio X was the studio where Alice in Chains recorded their 1995 self-titled album, their last record with original lead vocalist Layne Staley.

In June 2017, Mike Inez revealed that the band was not signed to a label, having completed its previous two-record contract with the Universal Music Group. Inez recalled that the band financed their 2009 album Black Gives Way to Blue, so they were not too worried about not having a label yet. Inez also said that Alice in Chains is a global band, so it had to be a significant label that has the infrastructure to get the album in stores in places like Singapore or South America.

William DuVall revealed on his Instagram account that the band started recording the album on June 12, 2017. The sessions were helmed by Nick Raskulinecz, who produced the band's two previous albums, Black Gives Way to Blue (2009) and The Devil Put Dinosaurs Here (2013).

During an interview with Eddie Trunk on his radio show Trunk Nation on August 21, 2017, Jerry Cantrell said about the new album; "We're in the process of cobbling together some tunes, and hopefully in the very near future we'll have something out for you guys." When asked about a release date, he replied; "I don't know. We'll see. When we're ready we'll let you know – but we are in the process of working on stuff." During an appearance on the TV show Fantasy Live on September 19, 2017, Cantrell said that the band had been working all summer on writing some music and hopefully something would come out "next year".

In December 2017, the album was ranked by Ultimate Guitar as the No. 2 out of the "Top 25 Most Anticipated Albums of 2018".

On January 11, 2018, producer Nick Raskulinecz announced via Instagram that the album was nearly finished and that there was only one more day left of recording.

During an interview with Guitar World published on April 11, 2018, Jerry Cantrell said that the album was recorded at four studios. After recording at Studio X in Seattle, the band went to Nashville to record vocals and lead guitars at Nick Raskulinecz's home studio. But Cantrell had to take an unexpected break from work after getting sick on a trip to Cabo San Lucas in Mexico to celebrate Sammy Hagar's birthday. Cantrell ate something bad, then was prescribed antibiotics that his body rejected, sidelining him for six weeks to recover back in Los Angeles. Cantrell had Alice in Chains' engineer, Paul Figueroa, come in to his house and record a lot of his vocals and solos there. The band finished recording the album at the Henson Recording Studios in Los Angeles. Cantrell also said he expected the album to be released "probably sometime this summer". The album was mixed at JHOC Studio, Joe Barresi's studio in Pasadena.

Gear-wise, Cantrell reported that he used "a lot of the old standard stuff", his G&L and Les Pauls guitars, and his signature Dave Friedman ‘Double J’ amp. Cleaner amps like AC30s and Fenders were also used. A cigar box amp that Nick Raskulinecz bought at the Pike Place Market in Seattle was used on three or four songs with a baritone guitar.

When the band was recording the album in Seattle, one of Chris Cornell's sisters brought one of his acoustic guitars to Studio X and presented it to DuVall and Cantrell, and both played it on the album. "That was another religious moment. It's there in the mix, every time we listen to this record, we know where it is", DuVall said.

At the press room of the Rock and Roll Hall of Fame Induction Ceremony on April 14, 2018, Cantrell revealed that Alice in Chains had just signed with BMG, and that they had finished mixing their new album.

== Music and lyrics ==
Speaking of the first single, "The One You Know", Jerry Cantrell said that he was inspired by David Bowie's 1975 hit "Fame". Cantrell said in an interview with Rolling Stone that he wrote the song around the time that Bowie died, and he must have been in his head a little bit.

The title track, "Rainier Fog", is a tribute to the Seattle music scene that launched bands such as Alice in Chains themselves, Pearl Jam, Soundgarden, Mother Love Bone, Mudhoney, Screaming Trees and Nirvana. The original demo for the title track was recorded at Cantrell's house in Los Angeles, with the help of Guns N' Roses bassist Duff McKagan, who also came from Seattle. McKagan played bass on the demo and said to Cantrell that it was his first single, although Cantrell did not have lyrics for the song yet. Cantrell told Classic Rock magazine that the lyrics "Left me here so all alone, only for me to find / Hear your voice on waves we rode, echoes inside my mind / Disembodied just a trace of what it was like then / With you here we shared a space that's always half-empty" are about Layne Staley and Mike Starr.

The track "Fly" was described as "country-inflected" by Kory Grow of Rolling Stone. Discussing the song, Guitar World noted a "Southern, classic rock" quality to Jerry Cantrell's guitar solo, similar to Lynyrd Skynyrd, with which Cantrell concurred, saying "that ending riff [...] that's totally Skynyrd".

"Maybe" begins with vocal harmonies and has been described as a "psychedelic swirl" by Guitar World. Spencer Kaufman of Consequence of Sound noted that the song "sprinkles in a bit of Beatles charm with a little Guns N' Roses balladry".

"So Far Under" was written by William DuVall, who also sang lead vocals and played the guitar solo on the track. DuVall explained the song saying; "It's about feeling completely up against it – outnumbered, surrounded, facing seemingly unbeatable odds and being really pissed off about it. It was inspired by personal circumstances, as well as events in the wider world."

Cantrell wrote the music and the chorus to "Never Fade", but he did not have a good verse and was intending to write it throughout the recording process. However, DuVall stayed at the Studio X in Seattle alone until 3 am and wrote the lyrics. "Never Fade" is DuVall's major composition in Rainier Fog. He wrote the lyrics inspired by the deaths of his grandmother and of Soundgarden lead vocalist Chris Cornell, among others. DuVall sings the verses and the pre-chorus of the song, while Cantrell sings the chorus. DuVall later told Kerrang! magazine that he was also thinking about Layne Staley while writing the lyrics.

While the band was recording at Studio X in the summer of 2017, former Queensrÿche guitarist Chris DeGarmo played acoustic guitar on the track "Drone", which Cantrell was struggling to get right in the studio. DeGarmo had previously collaborated with Cantrell as a touring guitarist on the tour for Cantrell's debut solo album, Boggy Depot, in 1998, and made a guest appearance on his 2002 solo album Degradation Trip. DeGarmo also worked with Mike Inez and Sean Kinney on the short-lived project Spys4Darwin.

The album closes with the seven-minute track "All I Am", described by Rolling Stone as "a swirling hard-rock tune that takes a long look backward, with sweeping guitar and echoes of Aerosmith and Led Zeppelin."

== Release ==
During Alice in Chains' concert at the House of Blues in Boston on April 28, 2018, Jerry Cantrell announced that a new song would be released the following week, and the new album would be released in August.

The album's first single, "The One You Know", was released via Spotify, Amazon and iTunes on May 3, 2018. It features Cantrell on lead vocals. A music video directed by Adam Mason was released on YouTube on the same day.

During an interview with Eddie Trunk on Trunk Nation on May 7, 2018, Jerry Cantrell stated that the new album would be released at the end of August 2018, and that a new single would be released in 8 weeks.

On June 27, 2018, the album's second single, "So Far Under" with DuVall on lead vocals, was released via YouTube, streaming and digital download. The band also announced that the new album will be titled Rainier Fog and that it would be released on August 24, 2018. The album's cover art and the track listing were also revealed on the same day, and the album was also made available for pre-order.

The album was released digitally, as well as on CD and limited-edition double 180-gram clear LP with white and black splatter available only from Alice in Chains' online store.

The third single, "Never Fade", was released on August 10, 2018, via YouTube, streaming and digital download. DuVall and Cantrell share lead vocals in the song.

One day ahead of the official release, the full album was played by Seattle radio station KISW along with an interview with the band.

The song "Red Giant" was released on Alice in Chains' official YouTube channel on August 23, 2018.

On February 5, 2019, Jerry Cantrell told The Seattle Times that he was editing the song "Rainier Fog" for radio play. The lyric video for "Rainier Fog" was released on Alice In Chains' official YouTube channel on February 26, 2019. The version featured in the lyric video is lower and slower than the album version, clocking it at 5:14 minutes. On March 22, 2019, a new lyric video featuring the album version of the song was published on YouTube, and the slower version was deleted from the band's channel.

== Title and packaging ==
Jerry Cantrell took the title "Rainier Fog" from Mount Rainier, a volcano that overlooks the Seattle metropolitan area. The cover art was revealed on June 27, 2018, and it features a black and white image of a triangle floating on the sea surrounded by fog. The triangle has an eye in the middle, similar to the Eye of Providence (or the all-seeing eye of God). The digipak packaging has a die-cut eye. A person of unknown gender with short blond hair can be seen from behind inside of the eye. When the booklet is opened, it is revealed that the person inside of the eye is actually standing on a river and looking at Mount Rainier, and the drawing of an eye has tears falling down straight into the river. The artwork was designed by Ryan Clark, who also designed the artwork for Alice in Chains' previous album, The Devil Put Dinosaurs Here (2013). Photos of the band taken by Scott Dachroeden complete the booklet.

The lyrics "Left me here so all alone, only for me to find/Hear your voice on waves we rode, echoes inside my mind" from "Rainier Fog" are featured upside down on the front cover.

An animated version of the artwork was also used in the audio visualizer for the tracks "So Far Under", "Never Fade", "Red Giant" and "Rainier Fog" on YouTube. The opening sequence of episode 10 of the web series Black Antenna, "All I Am", showing Nil (played by Darri Ingolfsson) in a triangle with an eye in the middle was a reference to the cover of Rainier Fog.

An alternative vinyl cover with a white background was made available for UK indie stores in a limited edition of 1,000 copies.

== Promotion ==
The baseball team Seattle Mariners hosted a special "Alice in Chains Night" at the Safeco Field in Seattle on August 20, 2018, to promote Rainier Fog, with the team offering the fans a package that included a Safeco Field terrace club ticket, access to a pre-game listening party of the album, an Alice in Chains t-shirt and a Rainier Fog CD. Jerry Cantrell also threw out the ceremonial first pitch and delivered a strike before the Seattle Mariners vs. Houston Astros game.

To mark the launch of the album, on August 21, 2018, Alice in Chains performed an acoustic set at the top of Seattle's Space Needle and debuted the song "Fly". Alice in Chains were the first band to perform on the Space Needle's new "Loupe" glass floor, the world's first and only revolving glass floor 500 feet high. The concert was exclusive for an audience of SiriusXM subscribers. SiriusXM broadcast the concert on their channel Lithium on August 31, 2018.

On August 22, 2018, Alice in Chains sent fans on a Scavenger hunt to access a secret gig that the band would be performing in Seattle on August 24. Ten signed CD copies of Rainier Fog were hidden around the city as a ticket into the show, and the band asked the fans to keep an eye on their Instagram story for details on the 10 hidden locations. Once all 10 albums were found, the band revealed that the secret gig would be at the rock club The Crocodile, with limited tickets available with the purchase of their album at a pop-up event at the same venue the next day. Preview clips of each of the album tracks were posted on the band's Instagram.

The band also commemorated the release of the album with a pop-up museum installation at The Crocodile in Seattle on August 23 and 24. The museum featured rare Alice in Chains photos, limited-edition merchandise and memorabilia that showcased the band's 30+ year career.

== Music videos, film and web series Black Antenna ==
The music video for "The One You Know", was directed by Adam Mason and released on Alice in Chains' official YouTube channel on May 3, 2018. It features a psychedelic look with an opposing red and green color scheme with grainy visuals and cuts to tiny critters scurrying about while the band is performing. The scenes of the band performing were shot at their old rehearsal space in Los Angeles. Actors Paul Sloan, Viktoriya Dov and Eric Michael Cole also star in the video in a parallel storyline.

During an interview with Eddie Trunk on his radio show Trunk Nation on May 7, 2018, vocalists Jerry Cantrell and William DuVall revealed that drummer Sean Kinney talked to director Adam Mason, who is making a dark sci-film, and they talked about doing two separate pieces of art and maybe molding them together, and that the music video for "The One You Know" is the first chapter of molding Mason's film and the band's music videos together.

In June 2018, William DuVall said in an interview with Swedish website Rocksverige that the video for "The One You Know" is the first chapter of what the band is hoping will be visuals for all ten songs from the album Rainier Fog, and in addition to that, will be a companion piece to the film that director Adam Mason was shooting.

The music video for the single "Never Fade" was released on November 1, 2018, and continued the storyline from the video of "The One You Know", with the three main actors making a comeback and also starring Mike Hatton, Jerry Raines Jr., and Darri Ingolfsson in clips from Adam Mason's upcoming sci-fi film Black Antenna. The music video also features footage of the band performing the song in a studio colored by red and green lights.

On December 13, 2018, the teaser of the film Black Antenna featuring the song "Rainier Fog" was released on Alice in Chains' official YouTube channel, with drummer Sean Kinney stating; "We've always toyed with the idea of creating videos for every song on one of our albums. Not only did we do that for Rainier Fog, it got totally out of hand and we made a whole goddamn movie. Everything that will be seen in the videos will be footage from Black Antenna to preface the complete film's release."

The official trailer for Black Antenna was released on Alice In Chains' YouTube Channel on February 28, 2019. Besides a 90-minute film, a web series will also be released. Episodes 1 and 2, "The One You Know" and "Rainier Fog", respectively, were released on YouTube on March 7, 2019. Black Antenna was written by Adam Mason and Paul Sloan, with Alice in Chains acting as executive producers along with Jason Collins. It tells the story of aliens father and daughter, Alpha (Sloan) and Beta (Dov), who drive across California in silence, speaking only telepathically. Along the way, the daughter seduces men and steals from them to help her father build an antenna so that he can send a message to their people at home. At the same time, they are being tracked down by evil forces and must avoid being killed. Episode 3, "Red Giant", premiered exclusively on Syfy Wire on March 21, 2019. Episode 4, "Fly", was released on April 4, 2019, episode 5, "Drone", on April 18, 2019, episode 6, "Deaf Ears Blind Eyes" premiered exclusively on Kerrang! magazine website on May 2, 2019. Episode 7, "Maybe" was released on YouTube on May 23, 2019. Episode 8, "So Far Under" premiered on June 6, 2019, and episode 9, "Never Fade", on June 27, 2019. The tenth and last episode, "All I Am", was released on July 17, 2019.

An official music video for "Rainier Fog" was released on YouTube on May 15, 2019. It was co-directed by Alice in Chains and Peter Darley Miller, who also directed the band's 2013 mockumentary, AIC 23. The video is not part of the Black Antenna series, but a comic video showing the band raising a giant beer bottle in Seattle, as a reference to the Rainier Beer commercials.

== Critical reception ==
Professional ratings
Aggregate scores
Source	Rating
Metacritic	73/100
Review scores
Source	Rating
AllMusic	4/5 stars
Consequence of Sound	B−
Exclaim!	7/10
Metal Hammer	4/5 stars
NME	4/5 stars
PopMatters	7/10
The Music	4/5 stars
Rolling Stone	2.5/5 stars
Metal Storm	7/10
Pitchfork	5.7/10

For Revolver magazine, Rainier Fog "delivers something for old and new fans alike, and leaves listeners with a feeling of great anticipation, and optimism, about what the future holds for the Seattle band."

Metal Hammer said that "each track showcases masterful songwriting and inspired lyricism. Rainier Fog sees the band breathing new life into their signature sound, with a diverse and deeply emotional collection that history will surely view as a career-defining statement." The magazine also included the album on its list of the 50 best albums of 2018, ranked at No. 25.

For Billboard, "Cantrell's increased vocal presence and his tandem vocals with DuVall have made this "mark two" version of Alice such a vital force in the thinning field of hard rock acts on modern radio."

Loudwire wrote that Rainier Fog might be the finest album from Alice in Chains' current lineup, and that "Cantrell and DuVall have become such a good vocal team, it's sometimes difficult to determine where one voice ends and the other begins (this has always been the case with AiC and is why Cantrell is somewhat under-appreciated as a lead vocalist)."

Joe Smith-Engelhardt from Exclaim! praised the album, saying, "The band are much more than a simple grunge band these days, and their use of doom and sludge elements has come to be the best aspect of their sound."

Pitchfork contributor Robert Ham rated the album 5.7/10, writing that "recapturing their heyday was always going to be an impossible feat", and that even though William DuVall and Mike Inez are respectively effective replacements for Layne Staley and Mike Starr, "these new members’ styles have effectively turned Alice in Chains into a different band."

AltWire included Rainier Fog on its list of Top 10 Alternative/Metal Albums of 2018, ranked at No. 5, and writing that the album "has a little bit of everything that makes this band one of the most influential rock acts of the past 30 years", and that guitarist and founder Jerry Cantrell "proves once again why he is one of the most under-rated guitarists of our time with some excellent soloing that ranks amongst his best work."

== Commercial performance ==
Rainier Fog debuted at No. 12 on the Billboard 200 chart, selling 31,000 copies (29,000 in traditional album sales), in its first week of release. The album also debuted at No. 1 on Billboard's Top Rock Albums, Alternative Albums and Hard Rock Albums charts, and at No. 3 on the Vinyl Albums chart.

Rainier Fog also debuted at No. 3 in Switzerland, No. 8 in Germany, No. 9 in the UK (the band's first top 10 in the UK), topping UK's Rock & Metal Albums chart, No. 7 in Finland, No. 11 in Canada, No. 16 in Japan and the Netherlands, No. 19 in Belgium and Sweden, No. 21 in France, and No. 29 in Italy.

"The One You Know" spent 17 weeks on Billboard's Mainstream Rock chart and peaked at No. 9. The song also reached No. 2 on the Hard Rock Digital Song Sales chart, No. 10 on the Alternative Digital Song Sales chart, No. 27 on the Rock Airplay chart, and No. 36 on the Hot Rock Songs chart.

"Never Fade" peaked at No. 10 on the Mainstream Rock chart, and "Rainier Fog" peaked at No. 20.

== Track listing ==
All lyrics are written by Jerry Cantrell, except where noted; all music is composed by Cantrell, except where noted.

No.	Title	Lyrics	Music	Length
1.	"The One You Know"			4:49
2.	"Rainier Fog"			5:01
3.	"Red Giant"		Cantrell; Mike Inez; Sean Kinney	5:25
4.	"Fly"		Cantrell; Kinney	5:18
5.	"Drone"		Cantrell; Inez; Kinney	6:30
6.	"Deaf Ears Blind Eyes"			4:44
7.	"Maybe"			5:36
8.	"So Far Under"	William DuVall	DuVall	4:33
9.	"Never Fade"	DuVall; Cantrell		4:40
10.	"All I Am"			7:15
Total length:				53:21

== Personnel ==
Alice in Chains

- Jerry Cantrell – vocals, lead guitar
- William DuVall – vocals, rhythm guitar, guitar solo on "So Far Under"
- Mike Inez – bass guitar
- Sean Kinney – drums

Additional performer

- Chris DeGarmo – acoustic guitar on "Drone"

Production

- Nick Raskulinecz – production
- Alice in Chains – production
- Paul "Fig" Figueroa – recording (at Studio X, Henson, and "Casa de Cantrell")
- Nathan Yarborough – recording (at Dark Horse and Rock Falcon)
- Steve Olmon – additional recording
- Joe Barresi – mixing, additional recording (at JHOC)
- Dave Collins – mastering
- Ryan Clark – art direction, design
- Scott Dachroeden – band photography

== Charts ==
=== Weekly charts ===
Chart (2018)	Peak position
Australian Albums (ARIA)	15
Austrian Albums (Ö3 Austria)	6
Belgian Albums (Ultratop Flanders)	32
Belgian Albums (Ultratop Wallonia)	13
Canadian Albums (Billboard)	11
Czech Albums (ČNS IFPI)	28
Dutch Albums (Album Top 100)	30
Finnish Albums (Suomen virallinen lista)	7
German Albums (Offizielle Top 100)	8
Hungarian Albums (MAHASZ)	18
Irish Albums (IRMA)	20
Italian Albums (FIMI)	27
Japanese Albums (Oricon)	70
New Zealand Albums (RMNZ)	23
Norwegian Albums (VG-lista)	20
Scottish Albums (Official Charts)	4
Spanish Albums (PROMUSICAE)	32
Swedish Albums (Sverigetopplistan)	19
Swiss Albums (Schweizer Hitparade)	3
UK Albums (Official Charts)	9
UK Rock & Metal Albums (Official Charts)	1
US Billboard 200	12
US Top Rock Albums (Billboard)	1

=== Year-end charts ===
Chart (2018)	Position
US Top Rock Albums (Billboard)	96
