= No Walls =

American hard rock band from Atlanta, Georgia

- Hank Schroy, William DuVall, and Matthew Cowley

Background information
- Origin: Atlanta, Georgia, U.S.
- Genres: Hard rock
- Years active: 1988–1992
- Past members: William DuVall; Hank Schroy; Matthew Cowley

No Walls was an American hard rock band from Atlanta, Georgia, formed in 1988. Its members were William DuVall (vocals, guitar), Hank Schroy (bass guitar), and Matthew Cowley (drums). The band released one self-titled album in 1992 through Full Moon Records; it was recorded at Electric Lady Studios under the mentorship of songwriter Vernon Reid.

== History ==
=== Formation, rise and break-up (1988–1992) ===
When his previous project The Final Offering fell apart before it got off the ground in 1988, William DuVall formed No Walls with Hank Schroy and Matthew Cowley later that year, taking up lead vocal duties for the first time.

Regarding his experience in this project, Duvall said:

"At the time (1988-1992), I viewed No Walls as a pop group. I thought there were loads of people just waiting for a band that could assimilate Hendrix, Joni Mitchell, Sonic Youth, Ornette Coleman, Nusrat Fateh Ali Khan, the Beatles and many others into a seamless blend and take rock music forward."

"It seemed abundantly clear to me that this was how the culture needed to evolve — rock, jazz, pop and world music all fusing together to form one truly universal language. No Walls was the embodiment of everything I had dreamed of since I first got turned on to music. We were the Freedom Principle in action!"

No Walls generated much interest after giving a demo to Vernon Reid backstage after a show. David Frick of Rolling Stone described one of their shows as "a brilliant collision of sinewy punk attack, angular-jazz maneuvers and catchy art-pop songwriting." However, their first and only album to date, the eponymous No Walls, released in 1992, met with disappointment and led to the dissolution of the band.

=== Post-No Walls (1992–present) ===
Since the break-up of No Walls, DuVall has founded and fronted two other bands called Madfly and Comes with the Fall, releasing several albums between both those projects. He is currently fronting Alice in Chains in place of their original lead singer Layne Staley, who died in 2002 after a long battle with severe drug addiction. In 2009, Alice in Chains released Black Gives Way to Blue, their first album with DuVall on vocals, his biggest selling album to date. DuVall thanked Hank Schroy and Matthew Cowley within the liner notes of that album.

== Discography ==
- No Walls (1992)
