= So Far Under =

Single by Alice in Chains

from the album Rainier Fog
- Released: June 27, 2018
- Recorded: June 12, 2017–January 12, 2018
- Studio: Studio X, Seattle, Washington; Rock Falcon, Nashville, Tennessee
- Genre: Sludge metal; doom metal
- Length: 4:33
- Label: BMG
- Songwriter: William DuVall
- Producers: Nick Raskulinecz and Alice in Chains

Alice in Chains singles chronology
"The One You Know" (2018)	"So Far Under" (2018)	"Never Fade" (2018)

"So Far Under" is a song by the American rock band Alice in Chains and the second single from the band's sixth studio album, Rainier Fog, released on August 24, 2018. The single was released via YouTube, streaming and digital download on June 27, 2018. The lyrics and music were written by Alice In Chains' co-lead vocalist and rhythm guitarist William DuVall, who also played the guitar solo in the song.

== Origin ==
"So Far Under" is the first Alice in Chains song written entirely by William DuVall, and the first in the band's catalog written entirely by someone other than Jerry Cantrell or Layne Staley. DuVall said about the song in a press release:

It's about feeling completely up against it – outnumbered, surrounded, facing seemingly unbeatable odds and being really pissed off about it. It was inspired by personal circumstances, as well as events in the wider world. But it's not as resigned to defeat as it may seem. The lyric is a cold, hard assessment of a difficult situation but the music has a message all its own. There's still room to flip the script. Every aspect of writing and recording this song will always be remembered with a lot of joy – from recording the basic tracks and the guitar solo at Studio X in Seattle to doing further overdubs at Nick Raskulinecz's studio in rural Tennessee. Everyone in the band and our studio team really stepped up and knocked it out of the park on this one. We're extremely proud of this song and the entire album.

== Release and reception ==
The song was released on Alice in Chains' official YouTube channel on June 27, 2018, and it is also available for streaming and digital download.

Revolver magazine said that the song "finds the band leavening their signature grunge with dreary, hypnotic grooves reminiscent of 'Electric Wizard'". For Loudwire, "the track, heard seems to be a perfect fit for the Alice catalog, with a familiar guitar and drum sound. "So far under / Too much pain to tell / Now I'm ripped asunder / So far under", come the hypnotically-delivered lyrics of the chorus over evil sounding guitars."

== Music video ==
The music video for "So Far Under" was released on Alice In Chains' YouTube channel on June 6, 2019. It was directed by Adam Mason and continues the storyline that started with the music video for Rainier Fog's first single, "The One You Know". The video for "So Far Under" is the eighth episode of the sci-fi series Black Antenna, which tells the story of father and daughter named Alpha and Beta, two aliens disguised as humans who drive across California in silence, speaking only telepathically. Along the way, the daughter seduces men and steals from them to help her father build an antenna so that he can send a message to their people at home. At the same time, they are being tracked down by evil forces and must avoid being killed. Written by Adam Mason and Paul Sloan, the video stars Paul Sloan as Alpha, Viktoriya Dov as Beta, Darri Ingolfsson as Nil and Lily Robinson as Malum.

== Live performances ==
Alice in Chains performed the song live for the first time during their concert at the Queen Elizabeth Theatre in Vancouver, Canada on August 22, 2018.

== Personnel ==
- William DuVall – lead vocals, lead guitar
- Jerry Cantrell – rhythm guitar, backing vocals
- Mike Inez – bass
- Sean Kinney – drums

== Chart positions ==
Chart (2018)	Peak Position
Netherlands (Free40 Alternative Songs)	20
