= Starbenders =

American rock band

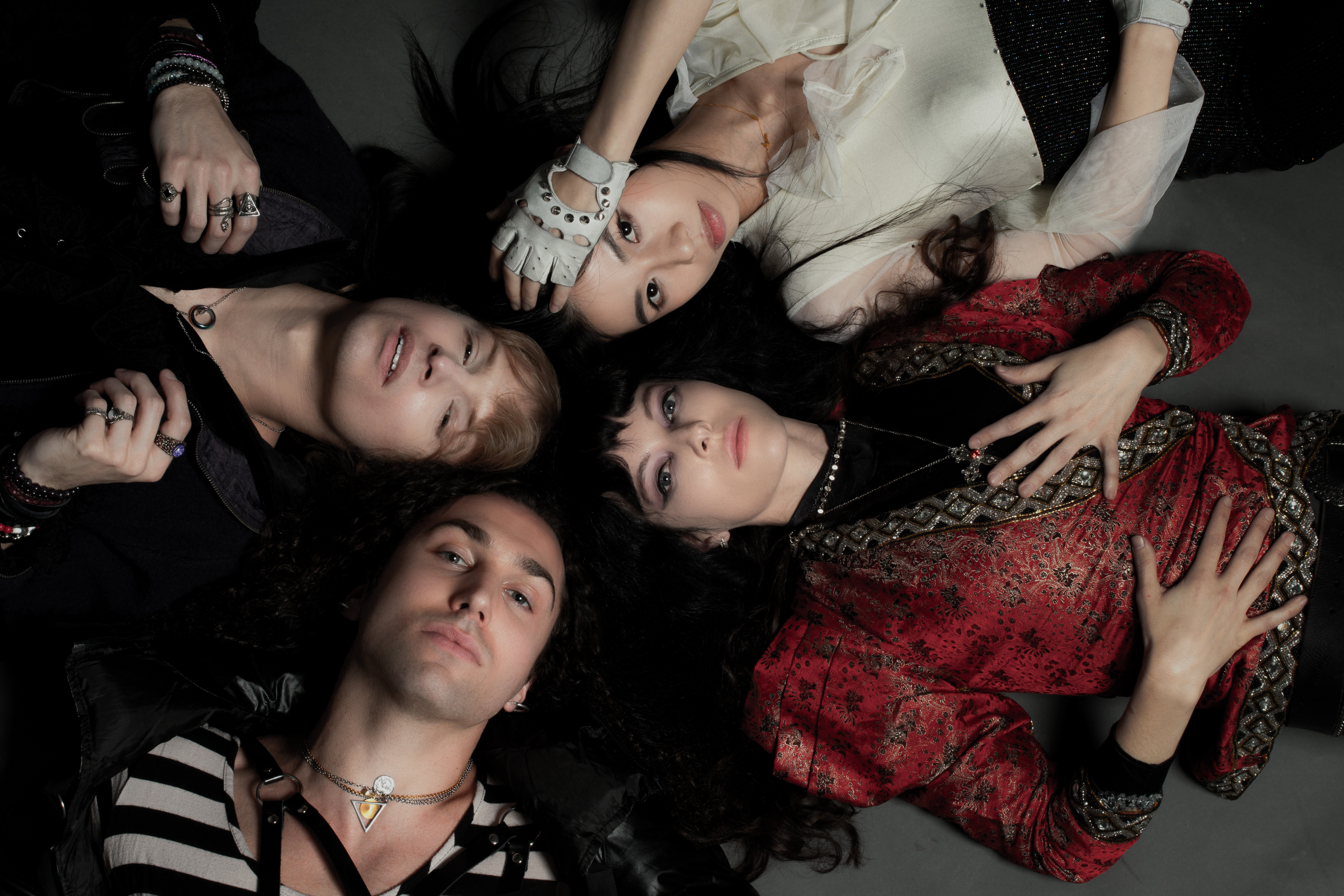
- Starbenders in 2024. Clockwise from top: Qi Wei, Kimi Shelter, Kriss Tokaji, Aaron Lecesne

Background information
- Origin: Atlanta, Georgia, U.S.
- Genre: Glam rock
- Years active: 2013–present
- Labels: Sumerian; Institution; B.I.J.
- Members: Kimi Shelter; Aaron Lecesne; Kriss Tokaji; Qi Wei
- Past members: Kyle Gordon; Katie Herron; Emily Moon
- Website: www.starbenders.com

Starbenders are an American rock band from the suburbs of Atlanta, Georgia. The group was formed in 2013 by lead singer and guitarist Kimi Shelter and bassist Aaron Lecesne. After adding guitarist Kriss Tokaji and drummer Emily Moon, Starbenders were signed to Nico Constantine’s label, Institution Records. With Constantine as their producer, the band has released three EPs, one full-length album, one 7-inch LP, and six singles on Institution Records and two singles and two full-length albums on Sumerian Records. In early 2024, Emily Moon left the band and was replaced by current drummer Qi Wei.

== Origin ==
The band was originally started by frontwoman Kimi Shelter with long-time friend and bassist Aaron Lecesne in 2013 with encouragement from producer Nico Constantine, who Shelter had worked with prior to the band's conception.

The pair found guitarist Kriss Tokaji in 2015. Katie Herron, another longtime friend of Shelter, played drums for the band until Emily Moon joined the lineup in 2017.

== Career ==
=== Early Years: 2014–2019 ===
Starbenders released their self-titled debut EP in 2014 to positive reception with the lead-off single Touch and quickly followed with the singles Brake, Paper Beats Rock, and Powder in 2015 while touring the United States extensively.

In 2016, they released another full-length, Heavy Petting, which was released by Institution Records and featured repeats of a few tracks from the first album such as Brake, Paper Beats Rocks, and Powder. The band led with the single Blood and released a music video for the track, followed by videos for Paper Beats Rock, Powder, and Time Stops, which won "Best Music Video" at the 2016 Oregon Film Awards. The record was engineered by Matt Goldman at Glow-In-The-Dark Studios and Jeff Bakos at Studio B, and mixed by Mark Needham and Will Brierre. CD releases of the album contained clean versions of several tracks while most digital versions remained explicit.

Starbenders continued to be active through 2017, touring and releasing the singles Far From Heaven (Which was later Included in the EP Japanese Rooms). In late 2017, the band began work on the EP JULIAN and released the title track Julian as a single before the EP's official release in January 2018.

Starbenders toured extensively in 2018 in support of JULIAN, notably touring alongside Charlotte Kemp Muhl's UNI, Rosegarden Funeral Party on the Children Of The Night tour, and Alice in Chains in support of the grunge icons' new record Rainier Fog.

In 2018, Starbenders signed a distribution deal with Japanese label B.I.J Records for Japanese releases. In April 2019, the band released the EP Japanese Rooms and embarked on an extensive tour of Japan to support the EP. Despite physical copies only being available in Japan, the EP was named LA Weekly's "Album Of The Week."

=== Sumerian Records: 2019–Present ===
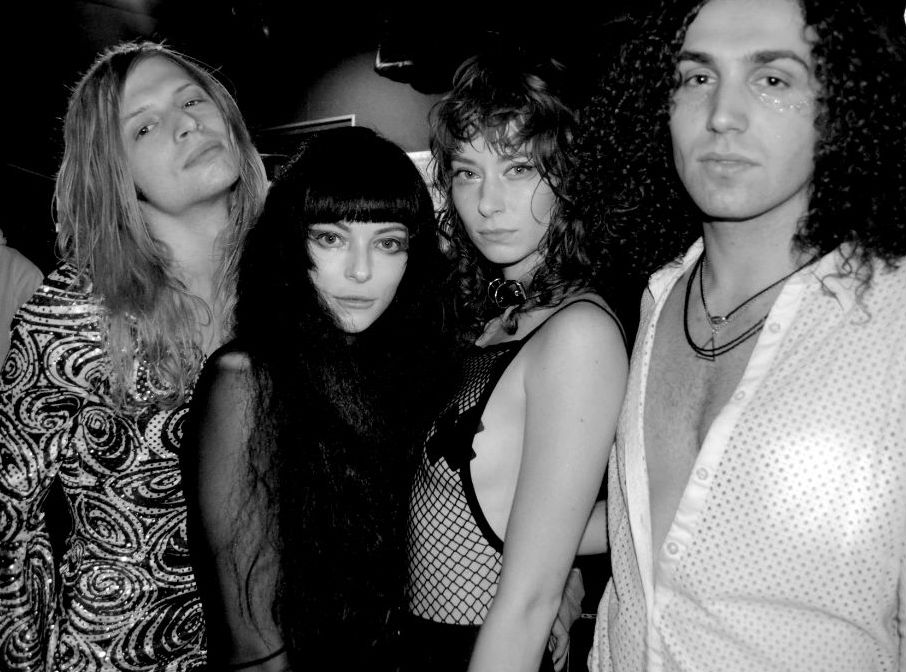
Starbenders in Tokyo, 2019

In May 2019, it was announced that Starbenders had signed to Sumerian Records, and the band's first single and video on the label, "London," was released to positive reception. The band then embarked on a US tour with labelmates Palaye Royale. Starbenders continued to tour through 2019, supporting Jamie Bower's band Counterfeit on a North American tour and releasing the single "Holy Mother" in September that year.

Starbenders began 2020 with a US tour with Asking Alexandria frontman Danny Worsnop. On February 14, they released their debut full-length on Sumerian Records, Love Potions, which was still produced by Nico Constantine. Reflecting on the thirteen months it took the band to record the album, Kimi Shelter said in an interview with Classic Rock Magazine, "We really just put our all into it. We wanted to come in old-school with it, and make sure that we were really honouring the ghosts of rock'n'roll past. It was frustrating, but the process really made us. It was both parts: beauty and pain." They collaborated with Remington Leith from Palaye Royale on Depeche Mode cover Precious.

Love Potions was digitally re-released as Love Potions (Zodiac Deluxe) in 2021 with 7 additional bonus tracks, including the bonus track from the Japanese version True Love, an acoustic version of Bitches Be Witches, and a remix of Push (both of which had been released prior to the re-release).

In April 2021, they digitally released an acoustic version of Time Stops and a coupling track together with The Mavens and Lilith Czar as singles for the soundtrack of American musical drama television series Paradise City. In August 2021, they released the digital single No One Listened.

Following the releases, the band began a headliner US tour with 22 dates and a Japan tour with 10 dates in 2022, which was originally planned for 2021 but had to be postponed to the following year. They were joined in Tokyo, Kyoto and Nagoya by Japanese artists such as 88Kasyo Junrei, SPARK!!SOUND!!SHOW!! and THE BOHEMIANS. In August 2022, they announced they would be opening for Palaye Royale's North American leg of their Fever Dream tour consisting of 25 dates. Later, they announced they would make their European debut as opening act for the Fever Dream tour alongside English rock band Yonaka on 34 dates. This was followed by a summer tour across the US with The Haunt, several festival dates, and a UK tour in October 2023.

The band released the full-length album Take Back The Night on September 22, 2023. Leading up to the album, they released Seven White Horses, If You Need It, Blood Moon, The Game, and Sex as singles in 2022 and 2023. The 13 track album also included a cover of Alice Cooper's Poison. The album contained their first charting song, The Game, which reached #39 on the Billboard Mainstream Rock Airplay charts.

In February 2024, drummer Emily Moon left. They also announced a US tour with Nita Strauss and Diamante. New drummer, Qi Wei, made her debut appearance with the band on this tour, and was later confirmed as an official member. The band began releasing singles with the new lineup in September, starting with "Tokyo" and it's respective music video. In 2025, the band continued to release the new singles "Chantilly Boy", "hello goodbye", "Cold Silver", "The Beast Goes On", and "To Be Alright", all through Sumerian Records.

== Members ==
=== Current members ===
- Kimi Shelter – lead vocals, rhythm guitar (2013–present)
- Aaron Lecesne – bass (2013–present)
- Kriss Tokaji – lead guitar (2015–present)
- Qi Wei - drums (2024–present)

=== Former members ===
- Kyle Gordon – lead guitar (2013–2016)
- Katie Herron – drums (2013–2017)
- Emily Moon – drums (2017–2024)

== Discography ==
=== Studio albums ===
- Heavy Petting (2016)
- Love Potions (2020)
- Love Potions (Zodiac Deluxe) (2021)
- Take Back the Night (2023)
- The Beast Goes On (2026)

=== EPs ===
- Starbenders (2014)
- JULIAN (2018)
- Japanese Rooms (2019)

=== 7-inch ===
- "Powder" (2015)

=== Singles ===
List of singles, with selected chart positions, showing year released and album name
Title	Year	Peak Chart Positions	Album(s)	
Title	Year	US Main. Rock	Album(s)	
"Brake"	2016	—	Starbenders	Heavy Petting
"Blood"	2016	—	Heavy Petting	
"So High"	2017	—	Non-album single	
"Far From Heaven"	2017	—	Japanese Rooms	
"Down and Out"	2017	—	Love Potions	
"1969"	2017	—	Non-album single	
"Julian"	2017	—	JULIAN	
"21st Century Orphan"	2018	—	Japanese Rooms	
"Never Lie 2 Me"	2019	—	Japanese Rooms	
"London"	2019	—	Love Potions	
"Holy Mother"	2019	—	Love Potions	
"Cover Me"	2020	—	Love Potions	
"One of Us"	2020	—	Love Potions	
"Push"	2020	—	Love Potions	
"Can't Cheat Time"	2020	—	Love Potions	
"Bitches Be Witches"	2020	—	Love Potions	
"No One Listened"	2021	—	Non-album single	
"Seven White Horses"	2022	—	Take Back the Night	
"If You Need It"	2022	—	Take Back the Night	
"Blood Moon"	2022	—	Take Back the Night	
"The Game"	2023	39	Take Back the Night	
"Sex"	2023	×	Take Back the Night	
"We're Not OK"	2023	×	Take Back the Night	
"Body Talk"	2023	×	Take Back the Night	
"Cherry Wine"	2023	×	Take Back the Night	
"Tokyo"	2024	×	The Beast Goes On	
"Chantilly Boy"	2025	×	The Beast Goes On	
"hello goodbye"	2025	×	The Beast Goes On	
"Cold Silver"	2025	×	The Beast Goes On	
"The Beast Goes On"	2025	×	The Beast Goes On	
"To Be Alright"	2025	×	The Beast Goes On	
"Saturday"	2026	×	The Beast Goes On	
"June"	2026	×	The Beast Goes On	

=== Other appearances ===
Title	Year	Band	Album
"Tonight, Tonight"	2026	The Smashing Pumpkins	Sending Hearts To All My Dearies: A Tribute To The Smashing Pumpkins
