= Madfly =

American glam rock band

- Bevan Davies, William DuVall, Jeffrey Blount, and Nico Constantine.

Background information
- Origin: Atlanta, Georgia, U.S.
- Genres: Glam rock, hard rock
- Years active: 1996–1999
- Labels: Killing Floor, Blackheart, Mercury
- Past members: William DuVall; Nico Constantine; Bevan Davies; Jeffrey Blount

Madfly was an American glam rock band from Atlanta, Georgia, formed in 1996. Its members were William DuVall (vocals, guitar), Nico Constantine (guitar), Jeffrey Blount (bass guitar), and Bevan Davies (drums). They recorded and released two albums, Get the Silver and White Hot in the Black, before changing their name to Comes with the Fall, following the departure of Jeffrey Blount in 1999.

== History ==
=== Formation, Get the Silver and White Hot in the Black (1996–1998) ===
After the demise of his previous band No Walls, William DuVall said he had been branded as someone playing music that was "difficult" or "ahead of its time" and he felt compelled to crush that perception as fast and as thoroughly as he could, which he said was essentially the purpose when he formed Madfly, "an over-the-top glam-pop group (that) took a complete 180 from his prior efforts." This project marked the first time DuVall would occasionally perform live without a guitar and focus strictly on singing, becoming "a full-fledged spectacle of a front man, complete with flashy costumes and body paint."

It pissed off a lot of people, especially some of the supporters of my previous bands. They felt betrayed, outraged. There was a lot of 'How dare you!' Then some people who hadn't known me before were like, 'Who does this fool think he is?' Local Atlanta rock bands just didn't do the kinds of things Madfly did. I remember one early show of ours where I painted myself silver — face, hair, hands, every inch of exposed skin — and wore a form-fitting silver pullover shirt and skintight black stovepipe corduroys. I don't think I ever wore the same thing onstage twice with Madfly.

A few months after their formation, Madfly released their debut album Get the Silver towards the end of 1996. Two years later, they put out a second album called White Hot in the Black, featuring the same cover as Get the Silver and a shorter track listing, half of which also appeared on its predecessor.

=== Transformation into Comes with the Fall (1999–present) ===
When bassist Jeffrey Blount left the band for medical reasons and was subsequently replaced by Adam Stanger, they quickly changed their name to Comes with the Fall. DuVall felt "my personal compass was telling me it was time to drop the mask, pick up the guitar (full-time) and kick out the jams again. It was time to take the music back to a darker, more dynamic place — the place I most naturally live — while drawing on everything I'd learned over the years with all my bands. It was also time to start writing more directly from the heart again, something I'd put on hold somewhat since No Walls, perhaps as a protection device."

Comes with the Fall recorded their self-titled album over an eight-week period from August to October before relocating to Los Angeles, California in February 2000.

== Discography ==
- Get the Silver (1996)
- White Hot in the Black (1998)
