= Tears (Rush song) =

1976 song by Rush

Song by Rush

from the album 2112
- Released: March 1976
- Recorded: January 1976
- Studio: Toronto Sound (Toronto, Canada)
- Length: 3:30
- Label: Anthem
- Songwriter: Geddy Lee
- Producers: Rush; Terry Brown

Music video
- "Tears" on YouTube

"Tears" is a song by the Canadian rock band Rush. It appears on their 1976 album 2112. It is the first Rush song to feature the Mellotron, played by Hugh Syme.

== Background ==
Geddy Lee said in an interview about the song: "'Tears' is a romantic ballad to give the album even more variety and depth. Mellotrons are unique-sounding; they sound sorta electric, but also kinda stringy, they have this real resin-y sound to them, which is very cool and unique to that period."

== Reception ==
Music Emissions said that it was the most underrated song on the album and that it was a departure for the band as a very heart-felt song of loss and regret.

Bill Banasiewicz said in the book Rush Visions that "It's better produced than 'Lessons', which immediately precedes it. It is very much in the mode of 'Rivendell' and marks one of the few times that Neil plays in a straight four-time signature."

Robert Telleria, in the book Merely Players, said about the song "once again Geddy proves he's not just a screamer and his lyrics improved."

== Personnel ==
Credits are adapted from 2112 liner notes.

Rush

- Geddy Lee – vocals, bass
- Alex Lifeson – electric and acoustic guitars
- Neil Peart – drums, percussion

Additional musician

- Hugh Syme – Mellotron

== Alice in Chains version ==
"Tears"

Single by Alice in Chains
- Released: November 18, 2016
- Length: 4:21
- Songwriter: Geddy Lee

Alice in Chains singles chronology
"Voices" (2013)	"Tears" (2016)	"The One You Know" (2018)

American rock band Alice in Chains covered the song and released it as a single. The cover was their first studio recording in three years. Their cover was also included on the second disc on the 40th anniversary edition of 2112. Rolling Stone magazine said about the cover: "Singer William DuVall delivers a grittier approach to Geddy Lee's original melody, and Jerry Cantrell spices up the instrumental sections with grandiose, harmonized electric guitar lines."

The American horror genre website Bloody Disgusting thought that the band "took the song, which was already mysteriously beautiful and added a slightly eerie element, making the song their own yet still preserving all the identifiable earmarks."

Nerdist said that the cover had "stunning and haunting harmonies that Alice in Chains is known for".

Consequence of Sound said that "while almost an exact recreation of the original, Alice in Chains can't help but put a touch of their own grunge sound on things."
