= The One You Know =

2018 single by Alice in Chains

Single by Alice in Chains

from the album Rainier Fog
- Released: May 3, 2018
- Recorded: June 12, 2017–January 12, 2018
- Studio: Studio X, Seattle, Washington; Rock Falcon, Nashville, Tennessee; Henson, Hollywood, California; Jerry Cantrell's home studio
- Genre: Heavy metal; sludge metal
- Length: 4:49
- Label: BMG
- Songwriter: Jerry Cantrell
- Producers: Nick Raskulinecz; Alice in Chains

Alice in Chains singles chronology
"Tears" (2016)	"The One You Know" (2018)	"So Far Under" (2018)

"The One You Know" is a song by the American rock band Alice in Chains, and the first single from the band's sixth studio album, Rainier Fog, released on August 24, 2018. The lyrics and music were written by Alice In Chains' guitarist and vocalist Jerry Cantrell. It was released as a single via streaming on May 3, 2018, accompanied by an official music video. "The One You Know" spent 17 weeks on Billboard's Mainstream Rock chart and peaked at No. 9.

== Origin ==
The lyrics and music were written by Alice In Chains' guitarist and vocalist Jerry Cantrell. Cantrell explained the song to SiriusXM:

It's really aggressive, it's got a super-aggro riff. I was thinking kind of a [David] Bowie when I was writing it a little bit. So, it's got kind of a metal 'Fame' shuffle to it almost. It's a good aggro riff, and it's got the classic Alice in Chains chorus, with a weird kind of trippy middle part.

Asked about the inspiration behind the song during an intimate session for Chicago radio station 101WKQX at The Sound Lounge on May 15, 2018, Cantrell said:

It's always really difficult for me to lay out what it is. Cause I'd rather you tell me… and not even tell me, it be whatever it is to you. And I'm also a little selfish too, I like to keep what it is for me as well. The cool part of songwriting, I think, and the challenge of it is taking something personal that is internal and making it universally translatable to everybody. We're all human beings, so we're not that far apart, and we're all pretty much the same, basically. So if you feel something and you put it out in a way that's not completely so spelled out, I think it's easier for people to make it their own.

For vocalist and rhythm guitarist William DuVall, the song is about "how things aren't always what they seem".

== Release and reception ==
During Alice in Chains' concert at the House of Blues in Boston on April 28, 2018, guitarist/vocalist Jerry Cantrell announced that a new song would be coming out "pretty soon". On April 30, 2018, Alice in Chains posted a cryptic 15-second teaser video with no sound on their social media pages. Another 16-second clip was shared on May 1, and an 18-second clip with the caption "05.04.18 #AIC" was shared on May 2.

The single was initially released via streaming on the Australian Spotify on May 3, 2018. Soon after, Alice in Chains posted on their social media a preview of the new music with a 19-second teaser of the music video and also announced the title of the single, "The One You Know", scheduled to be released on May 4, 2018 at 6am PST / 9am EST. However, both the single and the music video ended up being released earlier than announced. Later that day (May 3) at around 11pm PST, the single was available for streaming and download worldwide via Spotify, iTunes, Amazon Music, Apple Music and Google Play.

Classic Rock called the song "an irresistible blend of pummelling guitar chops, hazy grunge swathes and charismatic vocals. Just what they [Alice in Chains] do best. Good to have 'em back". Salute Magazine said; "the alt-metal warriors deliver a bad-ass monstrosity with larger than life vocals detonating ear drums in all directions. Not only does "The One You Know," secure that this album will be a promising one, but their intensifying guitar riffs, heavy-heart-pounding sound, and nostalgic style further proves that even 20 years later, they still got it." AXS stated; "Jerry Cantrell has always maintained the position that Alice in Chains was more a metal band than a grunge band and the guitar in this song leans more to the side of metal. However, with Cantrell's voice, this is a pure throw-back Alice in Chains track, dirty and bluesy."

The song peaked at No. 1 on Amazon's Best Sellers in Rock, and at No. 21 on Amazon's Top 100 Paid Songs.

== Music video ==
The teaser clips shared on Alice in Chains' social media pages from April 30 through May 3, 2018, were later revealed to be part of the music video for "The One You Know". The music video was directed by Adam Mason and was released on Alice in Chains' official YouTube channel on May 3, 2018. It features a psychedelic look with an opposing red and green color scheme with grainy visuals and cuts to tiny critters scurrying about while the band is performing. The scenes of the band performing were shot at their old rehearsal space in Los Angeles. Actors Paul Sloan, Viktoriya Dov and Eric Michael Cole also star in the video in a parallel storyline.

During an interview with Eddie Trunk on his radio show Trunk Nation on May 7, 2018, vocalists Jerry Cantrell and William DuVall revealed that drummer Sean Kinney talked to director Adam Mason, who is making a dark sci-film, and they talked about doing two separate pieces of art and maybe molding them together, and that the music video for "The One You Know" is the first chapter of molding Mason's film and the band's music videos together.

In June 2018, William DuVall said in an interview with Swedish website Rocksverige that the video for "The One You Know" is the first chapter of what the band is hoping will be visuals for all ten songs from the album Rainier Fog, and in addition to that, will be a companion piece to the film that director Adam Mason was shooting.

The music video for Alice in Chains' single "Never Fade" was released on November 1, 2018 and continued the storyline from the video of "The One You Know", with the three main actors making a comeback and also starring Mike Hatton, Jerry Raines Jr., and Darri Ingolfsson in clips from Adam Mason's upcoming sci-fi film Black Antenna. The music video also features footage of the band performing the song in a studio colored by red and green lights.

On March 7, 2019, a new version of the music video was released on YouTube as the first episode of the series "Black Antenna". It features the same actors from the first version and new scenes, but this time without footage of the band performing.

== Live performances ==
The song was performed live for the first time during Alice in Chains' concert at the Carolina Rebellion festival in Concord, North Carolina on May 4, 2018. An improvised acoustic version of the song was performed by Jerry Cantrell and William DuVall on May 15, 2018 at The Sound Lounge in Chicago, Illinois.

== Personnel ==
- Jerry Cantrell – lead vocals, lead guitar
- William DuVall – backing vocals, rhythm guitar
- Mike Inez – bass guitar
- Sean Kinney – drums

== Chart positions ==
"The One You Know" spent 17 weeks on Billboard's Mainstream Rock chart and peaked at No. 9.

Chart (2018)	Peak Position
Canada Active Rock (Mediabase)	20
Mexico Ingles Airplay (Billboard)	40
Netherlands (Free40 Alternative Songs)	1
US Mainstream Rock (Billboard)	9
US Hot Rock & Alternative Songs (Billboard)	36
