= Outrage (1998 film) =

- Genre: Drama; Thriller
- Written by: Ellen Weston
- Directed by: Robert Allan Ackerman
- Starring: Rob Lowe; Jennifer Grey; Kathryn Harrold; Eric Michael Cole
- Music by: David Mansfield
- Country of origin: United States
- Original language: English

Production
- Executive producers: Kevin Cooper; Francis Ford Coppola; Fred Fuchs
- Producer: Preston Fischer
- Production location: Vancouver
- Cinematography: Tobias A. Schliessler
- Editor: Ralph Brunjes
- Running time: 90 minutes
- Production companies: American Zoetrope; PolyGram Television

Original release
- Network: ABC
- Release: January 4, 1998

Outrage is a 1998 American made-for-television thriller drama film and a remake of the 1973 film of the same name. It originally aired on ABC on Sunday, January 4, 1998.

== Tagline ==
The film's tagline was "They trashed his car, his house, his life, then they went a little too far".

== Plot ==
A father-to-be and his pregnant wife become the targets of a revenge campaign after the man reports the criminal activities of a trio of wealthy teens to the police.

== Cast ==
- Rob Lowe as Tom Casey
- Jennifer Grey as Sally Casey
- Kathryn Harrold as Deena Bateman
- Eric Michael Cole as Jeffrey Bateman
- Shane Meier as Mark
- Cyrus Thiedeke as Fats
