= Boðberi =

- Directed by: Hjálmar Einarsson
- Written by: Hjálmar Einarsson
- Produced by: Hjálmar Einarsson; Hákon Einarsson; Þorvarður Björgúlfsson; Sigurbjörn Magnús Gunnlaugsson; Darri Ingolfsson; Ragnar Snorrason; Grímur Þórðarson
- Starring: Darri Ingolfsson; Ísgerður Elfa Gunnarsdóttir; Jón Páll Eyjólfsson; Magnús Jónsson; Pétur Einarsson; Móeiður Júníusdóttir; Hjalti Rögnvaldsson
- Cinematography: Edwin Krieg
- Edited by: Jóhannes Tryggvason
- Music by: Karl James Pestka
- Production company: Hersing ehf.
- Release date: July 7, 2010
- Running time: 93 minutes
- Country: Iceland
- Language: Icelandic

Boðberi (English title: Messenger) is a 2010 Icelandic dramatic film directed by Hjálmar Einarsson and starring Darri Ingolfsson. The film was released on July 7, 2010.

== Plot synopsis ==
Paul, part-time laborer and amateur artist, leads an unremarkable life like any other, until his world is disrupted by vivid revelations of the afterlife.

At first a welcome respite from reality, his waking visions soon reveal a demonic conspiracy at work within his own community. One by one, prominent members of high society fall victim to a series of mysterious assassination attempts. As the government scrambles to contain the rising panic of the ruling class, public disillusionment grows. Amidst the maelstrom, Paul becomes entangled in a web of powerful elite, evangelical cults, and a plot that could not only bring down the country's economy, but also incite the total collapse of society.

== Production ==
The film was mostly shot before the 2008 Icelandic financial crash that shocked the world, and it inadvertently became a prediction of the chaos that followed.

Boðberi is notable for being made without any public funding which is unusual for a theatrically distributed film in Iceland.

== Visual effects ==
Boðberi had numerous visual effects shot, most notably the explosion of the House of Parliament (Alþingi) in Reykjavík.

== Marketing ==
Before its premiere, Boðberi was marketed both online and on local TV stations. A theatrical trailer was premiered in May 2010.

== Release ==
Boðberi was released nationwide to cinemas on July 7, 2010. November 2010 saw its DVD release, and it was released on video-on-demand the following month. Boðberi premiered on RÚV, the Icelandic National TV, in 2019 and was made available for streaming for limited time. It re-ran on RÚV in 2021.

== Reception ==
Boðberi was met with polarized reviews; some praised the effort the filmmakers undertook while others were less enthusiastic, criticizing the incoherent plot and alleged mixed performances. It remains one of Iceland's most controversial movies to date.
