= Adam Stanger =

American musician

- Genres: Hard rock, heavy metal
- Occupation: Musician
- Instrument: Bass
- Years active: 1990–present
- Labels: DVL

Adam Stanger is an American musician best known as the bassist for the band Comes with the Fall. The Year is One, the band's second album, was released in 2001 to positive reviews. The following year, Comes with the Fall were announced to be Jerry Cantrell's opening and backing band for his tour in support of Degradation Trip, Cantrell's second solo album. Comes with the Fall toured with Cantrell throughout 2002, while they released a live album, titled Live 2002, the same year. A live DVD Live Underground 2002 towards the end of the 2003 and they planned to record and release a new album by 2004.

In February 2007, the band announced their first tour dates in three-and-a-half years, performing material from their EP, The Reckoning as well as their unreleased album. They released the album, Beyond the Last Light, the same year.

He has also played in the band Big Hate alongside his brother, singer-guitarist Brian Stanger, without his brother, Brian Stanger, Adam went on to play with Melt, later renamed The Young Royals, with singer-guitarist Eric Bradley.

== Big Hate ==
In the 1990s, Stanger formed the band Big Hate along with singer-guitarist Brian Stanger, his brother, and drummer Stephen Panas. Upon relocating from New York to Georgia, they were joined by second guitarist Rusty Cobb. The band recorded two albums, Big Hate and You're Soaking in It, released through Flip Records in 1995 and 1998.

== Comes with the Fall ==
In 1999, Stanger formed the band Comes with the Fall along with singer-guitarist William DuVall, guitarist Nico Constantine, and drummer Bevan Davies in Atlanta, Georgia. Before Stanger's arrival, this band had gone by the moniker Madfly with a different bass player named Jeffrey Blount and already recorded two albums Get the Silver and White Hot in the Black. Comes with the Fall recorded their self-titled album in Atlanta, a year later, before relocating to Los Angeles. Their self-titled album was released the same year through DuVall's DVL Records.

In 2001, Comes with the Fall were announced as the main support, along with Swarm, for Jerry Cantrell's solo tour. When Cantrell's then solo bandmates, bassist Robert Trujillo and drummer Mike Bordin, were unavailable for shows, he enlisted Stanger and Davies to perform as his backing band. They toured with Cantrell throughout 2002. They toured with Creed and Nickelback within this time. As Comes With The Fall was doing double duty as an playing same shows both as Comes With The Fall, then backing Jerry Cantrell.

The Year is One, the band's second album, was released later in the year to positive reviews. The following year, Comes with the Fall were announced to be Cantrell's opening and backing band for his tour in support of Degradation Trip, Cantrell's second solo album. Comes with the Fall toured with Cantrell throughout 2002, while they released a live album, titled Live 2002, the same year. A live DVD Live Underground 2002 towards the end of the 2003 and they planned to record and release a new album by 2004.

In February 2007, the band announced their first tour dates in three-and-a-half years, performing material from their EP, The Reckoning as well as their unreleased album. They released the album, Beyond the Last Light, the same year.

== Melt and The Young Royals ==
While touring with Jerry Cantrell and Comes with the Fall in 2002, Stanger met singer-guitarist Eric Bradley and drummer Josh Howser. With the addition of second guitarist Jason Saracco, they formed the band Melt and release a five-track CD in 2005 called Color the Sky. In 2007, the band changed their name to The Young Royals and released their full-length debut album Day of Truths.

== Discography ==
Title	Release	Label	Band
Big Hate	1995	FlipRecords	Big Hate
You're Soaking in It	1998	FlipRecords	Big Hate
Comes with the Fall	2000	DVL	Comes with the Fall
The Year is One	2001	DVL	Comes with the Fall
Live 2002 (live album)	2002	DVL	Comes with the Fall
Color the Sky (extended play)	2005	Motor Avenue Records	Melt
The Reckoning (extended play)	2006	DVL	Comes with the Fall
Beyond the Last Light	2007	DVL	Comes with the Fall
Day of Truths	2007	Motor Avenue Records	The Young Royals

== Videography ==
Release date	Title	Label
2003	Live Underground 2002	DVL
