= Never Fade (song) =

2018 single by Alice in Chains

Single by Alice in Chains

from the album Rainier Fog
- Written: 2017
- Released: August 10, 2018
- Recorded: June 12, 2017–January 12, 2018
- Studio: Studio X, Seattle, Washington; Rock Falcon, Nashville, Tennessee
- Length: 4:40
- Label: BMG
- Composer: Jerry Cantrell
- Lyricists: William DuVall; Jerry Cantrell
- Producers: Nick Raskulinecz; Alice in Chains

Alice in Chains singles chronology
"So Far Under" (2018)	"Never Fade" (2018)	"Rainier Fog" (2019)

"Never Fade" is a song by the American rock band Alice in Chains and the third single from the band's sixth studio album, Rainier Fog, released on August 24, 2018. The song was written by vocalists/guitarists Jerry Cantrell and William DuVall, who also share lead vocals, with DuVall singing the verses and the pre-chorus, while Cantrell sings the chorus. "Never Fade" is a tribute to DuVall's grandmother, Soundgarden lead vocalist Chris Cornell, and Alice in Chains' original lead singer Layne Staley. The song was released as a single on August 10, 2018 via YouTube, streaming and digital download. "Never Fade" peaked at No. 10 on Billboard's Mainstream Rock chart.

== Origin and recording ==
"Never Fade" was written by Alice in Chains' vocalists/guitarists Jerry Cantrell and William DuVall, who also share lead vocals, with DuVall singing the verses and the pre-chorus, while Cantrell sings the chorus. During an interview on Steve Jones' radio show, Jonesy's Jukebox, on August 10, 2018, Cantrell said that he initially did not think "Never Fade" was an Alice in Chains song; it was something they had laying around in the studio session. Cantrell had written the music and the chorus, but he did not have a good verse and was intending to write it throughout the recording process of Rainier Fog, or maybe for something that he would do later, like a soundtrack. DuVall ended up writing the lyrics for the song at Studio X in Seattle in the summer of 2017. He wrote and recorded the track alone in the studio until 3am. "Never Fade" is DuVall's major composition in Rainier Fog.

The song features the lyrics "all my friends are leaving". DuVall's grandmother, described by him as a pillar in his life, died at the age of 105 while the band was recording the album, and he wrote the lyrics to "Never Fade" thinking about his grandmother and the late Soundgarden lead vocalist Chris Cornell, who died a month before the band started recording the album, among others. DuVall later told Kerrang! magazine that he was also thinking about Layne Staley while writing the lyrics. Cantrell told Premier Guitar that the chorus he wrote is about something totally different than the verses written by DuVall.

Speaking with Classic Rock magazine in August 2018, DuVall said of the song:

Never Fade was written by myself in the studio. Everyone else had gone home. I stayed there all night and just absorbed and thought about a lot of things. And I felt like being in that setting helped trigger a lot of these things that needed to come out, that I'd been hanging on to, for a lot of time in some cases. I'd just lost my grandmother; you know about Chris [Cornell]. There was so much happening, going back.

The night-time session at the windowless studio in Seattle was contrasted with the home studio of producer Nick Raskulinecz in Nashville, Rock Falcon, where most of the vocals were completed. "We decamped to this opposite, bucolic community, with nothing but farmland for miles around. You could see sunlight or rain through the windows, and felt among the elements", DuVall said of the recording at Raskulinecz's studio.

== Release and reception ==
On August 9, 2018, Alice in Chains announced on their social media pages that a new song would be released the next day. The song was made available on Alice in Chains' official YouTube channel and for streaming and digital download on August 10, 2018.

Loudwire said that the song "has a slight garage rock feel with an immediate hook. There's a balance to the moods of 'Never Fade' with a moderate nod toward the gloom of their classic days, but it washes away with an emphatic pre-chorus and soothing refrain as the band promises an unnamed person they are not forgotten and will never fade." and listed it as the eighth best rock song of 2018.

Exclaim! wrote that "Never Fade" "offers everything Alice in Chains fans are likely looking for, pairing plenty of beefy guitars with even more meaty vocals."

== Live performances ==
The song was performed live for the first time during Alice in Chains' concert at the Queen Elizabeth Theatre in Vancouver, Canada on August 22, 2018, and was frequently performed throughout the Rainier Fog tour.

== Music video ==
A music video directed by Adam Mason was released on Alice in Chains' official YouTube channel on November 1, 2018. It continues the storyline from the previous music video for the single "The One You Know", and features actors Paul Sloan, Viktoriya Dov, Eric Michael Cole, Mike Hatton, Jerry Raines Jr., and Darri Ingolfsson in clips from the upcoming sci-fi film Black Antenna, also directed by Mason. The music video also features the band performing in a studio colored by red and green lights.

On June 27, 2019, a new version of the music video was released on YouTube as the ninth episode from the miniseries Black Antenna, also directed by Mason and starring the same actors. This version does not feature the band performing.

== Personnel ==
- William DuVall – lead vocals, rhythm guitar
- Jerry Cantrell – co-lead vocals, lead guitar
- Mike Inez – bass
- Sean Kinney – drums

== Charts ==
Chart (2018)	Peak Position
Canada Active Rock (Mediabase)	20
Netherlands (Free40 Alternative Songs)	12
US Active Rock (Mediabase)	10
US Mainstream Rock (Billboard)	10
US Rock & Alternative Airplay (Billboard)	32
