= Neon Christ =

American hardcore punk band

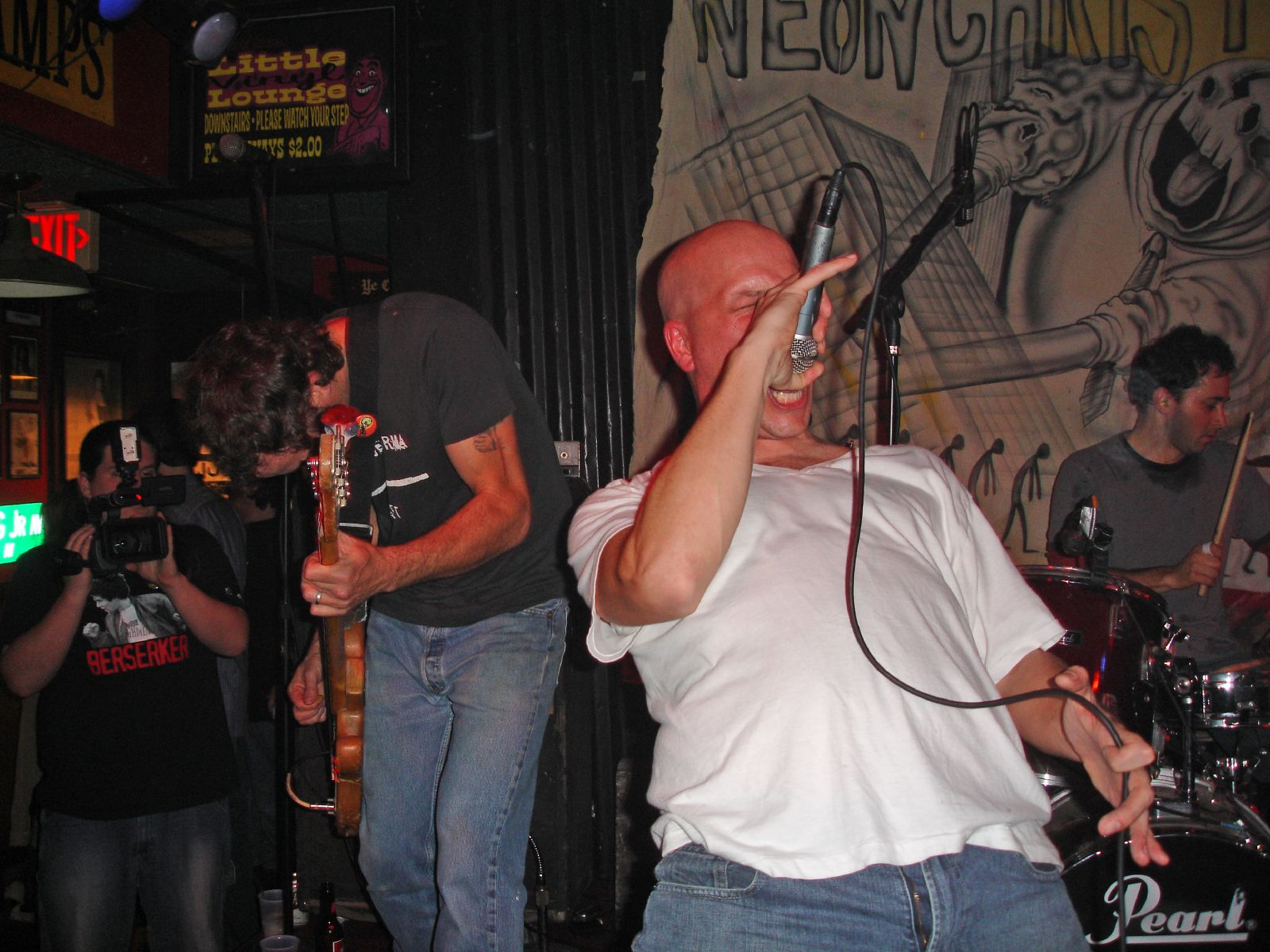
- Lankford, DuTeau and Demer of Neon Christ in 2006

Background information
- Origin: Atlanta, Georgia, U.S.
- Genres: Thrashcore; hardcore punk
- Years active: 1983–1986, 2006, 2008, 2011, 2021
- Labels: Social Crisis, F-King
- Past members: Randy DuTeau; William DuVall; Danny Lankford; Jimmy Demer

Neon Christ was an American hardcore punk band from Atlanta, Georgia.

== History ==
The band was formed in 1983 by Randy DuTeau (vocals), William DuVall (guitar), Danny Lankford (bass), and Jimmy Demer (drums). For a brief spell in 1985, they added a second guitarist named Shawn Devine. The band recorded and released two EPs, Parental Suppression and The Knife That Cuts So Deep, but only the former was a standalone; the latter was the second disc of a double 7" release that came out in 1990—four years after the band broke up. The song "Ashes to Ashes" was included as the third track on the International P.E.A.C.E. Benefit Compilation, a 1984 double album, released on R Radical Records, featuring 55 hardcore punk acts from around the world. They toured throughout the Atlanta area, playing alongside other notable acts such as Corrosion of Conformity and Dead Kennedys. The band played one final show in February 1986 before going their separate ways for the next two decades.

In early January 2006, Neon Christ reunited for a pair of shows, one in the afternoon at Eyedrum in downtown Atlanta and one in the evening at the Star Bar in Little Five Points.

They reunited again for a one-time show on February 2, 2008 in Lawrenceville, Georgia. The reception that they got inspired them to work with director Edgar Johnson on creating a documentary film called All Alone Together: Neon Christ and Atlanta Hardcore.

William DuVall said of the project:

I was first approached in 2005 by Edgar Johnson (director) about making a Neon Christ documentary. However, while I always thought our story was interesting, I really questioned who else would care. It was a long time ago. Nostalgia is boring to me. Why would I want to foist that onto anyone else? 'Back in my day…' Whatever, fuck off! I want to know what kids are doing NOW. But when Neon Christ reunited for one show in February 2008 and all these 15 and 16 year old kids were singing our songs back to us, it was very moving, and not just because it was a pleasantly surprising ego rush. It was more about what those kids and that club represented. The show took place at the Treehouse, a DIY all-ages storefront club in the Atlanta suburb of Lawrenceville. The energy and enthusiasm of the entire scene there was electrifying. Those kids were taking what we started, the real outsider/all-ages/DIY/basement punk culture and making it their own. That's when I knew we had our movie: Take two generations of outsider kids, nearly 30 years apart, and tell both their stories concurrently – what's different, what remains the same, why it all still matters."

== Discography ==
Studio EPs

- Neon Christ 7" (1984)
- Neon Christ 2x7" (1990)

Compilations

- 1984 (2021)

== Videography ==
Release date	Title	Label
TBA	All Alone Together: Neon Christ and Atlanta Hardcore	Social Crisis Films
