= Live 2002 (Comes with the Fall album) =

Live album by Comes with the Fall
- Released: 2002
- Genre: Alternative rock, hard rock
- Label: DVL

Comes with the Fall chronology
The Year Is One (2001)	Live 2002 (2002)	Live Underground 2002 (2003)

Live 2002 is the first live album by American rock band Comes with the Fall. It served as a companion to their Live Underground 2002 DVD later released in 2003.

== Track listing ==
No.	Title	Writer(s)	Length
1.	"Before the Fall" (from Comes with the Fall)	Constantine/DuVall
2.	"Smashdown" (from The Year Is One)	DuVall
3.	"Murder Scene" (from The Year Is One)	Constantine/DuVall
4.	"Unhinged" (from Comes with the Fall)	Constantine/Davies/DuVall/Stanger
5.	"The Three Wishes" (from Comes with the Fall)	Constantine/DuVall
6.	"Unbreakable" (from The Year Is One)	DuVall
7.	"Strung Out on a Dream" (from The Year Is One)	DuVall
8.	"So Divine" (from The Year Is One)	DuVall
9.	"Symptom of the Universe" (song by Black Sabbath from album Sabotage)	Butler/Iommi/Osboure/Ward

== Personnel ==
Comes with the Fall

- Bevan Davies – drums
- William DuVall – vocals, guitar
- Adam Stanger – bass guitar

Production

- Christopher Horvath – engineering
- Russ Fowler – mixing
- Alex Lowe – mastering
- Josh Paul – live sound engineering
- William DuVall – production
