= New Best Friend =

- Theatrical release poster
- Directed by: Zoe Clarke-Williams
- Written by: Victoria Strouse
- Produced by: Frank Mancuso Jr.
- Starring: Mia Kirshner; Meredith Monroe; Dominique Swain; Rachel True; Eric Michael Cole; Scott Bairstow; Taye Diggs
- Cinematography: Tom Priestley Jr.
- Edited by: Norman Buckley; Leo Trombetta
- Music by: David A. Hughes; John Murphy
- Production company: FGM Entertainment
- Distributed by: TriStar Pictures (through Sony Pictures Releasing)
- Release date: April 12, 2002
- Running time: 91 minutes
- Country: United States
- Language: English
- Budget: $8 million
- Box office: $46,375

New Best Friend is a 2002 American psychological thriller film based on a story by Victoria Strouse. The film was originally owned by Metro-Goldwyn-Mayer (MGM), which eventually relinquished the rights to it. Later, Sony Pictures acquired the rights to distribute the film in the United States and some other territories mainly on home video; the film was ultimately released theatrically in the United States in a limited theatrical release by TriStar Pictures on April 12, 2002. It was a critical and box office bomb.

== Plot summary ==
A North Carolina sheriff investigates the near-fatal drug overdose of a working class college girl and discovers many sordid details of her life before and during her descent into drugs and debauchery.

== Cast ==
- Mia Kirshner as Alicia Campbell
- Meredith Monroe as Hadley Ashton
- Dominique Swain as Sidney Barrett
- Rachel True as Julianne Livingstone
- Eric Michael Cole as Warren
- Scott Bairstow as Trevor
- Taye Diggs as Sheriff Artie Bonner
- Oliver Hudson as Josh
- Joanna Canton as Sarah
- Dean James as Max
- Glynnis O'Connor as Connie Campbell
- Ralph Price as Eddie

== Reception ==
=== Critical response ===
On Rotten Tomatoes, it has a rating of 5%.

=== Box office ===
It grossed $46,375 against a budget of $8 million.
