= Beyond the Last Light =

Studio album by Comes with the Fall
- Released: 2007
- Genre: Alternative rock, hard rock
- Length: 38:15
- Label: DVL

Comes with the Fall chronology
The Reckoning (2006)	Beyond the Last Light (2007)

Professional ratings
Review scores
Source	Rating
AllMusic	4/5 stars

Beyond the Last Light is the third studio album by American rock band Comes with the Fall.

== Critical reception ==
Music critic Greg Prato wrote in AllMusic:

"Musically, Comes with the Fall certainly has a soft spot for the big riff thang (DuVall also supplies six-string in the band), as evidenced by the Kyuss-esque 'Rockslide' and the Audioslave-ish 'Pale Horse Rider.' However, not all of Beyond the Last Light is aggressive: both 'White Hot' and 'Still Got a Hold on My Heart' manage to take the fury down a notch, and tread on melodic territory. Finally -- a rock band in the early 21st century that won't sound out of place on rock radio, but that you also won't be embarrassed to admit liking."

== Track listing ==
All tracks by William DuVall, except where noted.

No.	Title	Writer(s)	Length
1.	"Rockslide"		2:51
2.	"The Last Light"	Constantine/DuVall/Stanger	4:15
3.	"Pale Horse Rider"		3:05
4.	"White Hot"		4:13
5.	"Beautiful Destroyer"	Davies/DuVall/Stanger	3:30
6.	"Hologram"	Davies/DuVall/Stanger	3:09
7.	"Black Cross"	Constantine/DuVall	6:06
8.	"Deadly Ecstasy"		2:56
9.	"Still Got a Hold on My Heart"		4:21
10.	"Fire Come Down"		3:49

== Personnel ==
Comes with the Fall

- Bevan Davies – drums
- William DuVall – vocals, guitar
- Adam Stanger – bass guitar

Additional performers

- Matthew Cowley – percussion on "Black Cross"
- Noah Pine – piano on "Still Got a Hold on My Heart"

Production

- Produced by William DuVall
- Engineered by Jeff Bakos
- Mastered by Stephan Marsh
