= Biters (band) =

American rock band

- Origin: Atlanta, Georgia, U.S.
- Genres: Hard rock; alternative rock; garage rock; garage punk; glam punk; glam rock; blues rock; power pop
- Years active: November 15, 2009 – October 21, 2018
- Labels: Earache, Pipeline Records, Pop The Balloon(France), Yeah Right! (Canada), Underrated
- Past members: Tuk Smith; Joey O'Brien; Matt Gabs; Ricky Dover Jr.; Travis Brown; Mikey Portwood; Philip Anthony

Biters were a rock band from Atlanta, Georgia. The band was formed in 2009 developing from the band Poison Arrows. Biters released 4 EPs from 2010 to 2012 before they signed to independent record label Earache Records in 2015 and released their debut LP, Electric Blood on August 7 of the same year. Their final album The Future Ain't What It Used To Be came out in 2017.

Their main influences included bands such as Cheap Trick, David Bowie, Alice Cooper, New York Dolls, Thin Lizzy, Dead Boys, Slade, Sweet, The Boys, The Scruffs etc. They received significant credit from people such as Nikki Sixx, from Mötley Crüe. Biters were also featured in Classic Rock Magazine several times. and were called a "bite-sized slice of retro rock'n'roll debauchery.". In addition to Classic Rock, they were featured in other notable websites such as Team Rock, Planet Rock, 50Thirdand3rd.com, Gaffa, OUIFM, Soundscape and Alternative Press

On October 21, 2018, they announced their indefinite hiatus.

== Discography ==
=== Albums ===
- Electric Blood (2015)
- The Future Ain't What It Used to Be (2017)

=== Compilation albums ===
- It's All Chewed Up OK? (2012)
- Cut Your Teeth (2016)

=== EPs ===
- Biters (2010)
- It's Ok to Like Biters (2010)
- All Chewed Up (2011)
- Last of a Dying Breed (2012)

=== Singles ===
- "Hang Around" b/w "Beat Me Baby" (2010)
- "Indigo" b/w "Saturday Night Cat Fight" (2014)
- "1975" (2015)
- "Restless Hearts" (2015)
- "Low Lives in Hi Definition" (2015)
- "Heart Fulla Rock 'n' Roll" (2015)
- "The City Ain't the Same" (2016)
- "Stone Cold Love" b/w "Callin' You Home" (2017) [Record Store Day limited release]
