= Black Antenna =

- Directed by: Adam Mason
- Written by: Adam Mason; Paul Sloan
- Based on: Rainier Fog by Alice in Chains
- Produced by: Adam Mason; Elizabeth Mason; Nick Vallelonga
- Starring: Paul Sloan; Viktoriya Dov; Darri Ingolfsson; Eric Michael Cole
- Music by: Alice in Chains
- Release date: 2019
- Running time: 90 minutes
- Country: United States
- Language: English

Black Antenna is an American science-fiction film inspired by Alice in Chains' 2018 album Rainier Fog. Written, produced and directed by Adam Mason, starring Paul Sloan, Viktoriya Dov, Darri Ingolfsson, Cait Mathis and Eric Michael Cole. Alice in Chains are executive producers on the film along with Jason Collins. The film tells the story of extraterrestrial father and daughter, Alpha and Beta, who drive across California in silence, speaking only telepathically. The daughter seduces men and steals from them to help her father build an antenna to send a message to their people at home. At the same time, they are being tracked down by evil forces that are trying to kill them. A 10-part web-series focused on each song from Rainier Fog was released in 2019.

== Cast ==
- Paul Sloan ... Alpha
- Viktoriya Dov ... Beta
- Eric Michael Cole
- Darri Ingolfsson ... Nil
- Luke Shelton ... Roach
- Mike Hatton ... Sheriff
- Nick Vallelonga ... Pet store owner
- Jerry Raines Jr. ... Officer Calhoun
- Lily Robinson ... Malum
- Daniel Louis Rivas ... Bodie
- Cait Mathis … Roxy
- Mark Sherman … Actor

== Production ==
During an interview with Eddie Trunk on his radio show Trunk Nation on May 7, 2018, Alice in Chains' vocalists Jerry Cantrell and William DuVall revealed that drummer Sean Kinney talked to director Adam Mason, who was making a dark sci-film, and they talked about doing two separate pieces of art and maybe molding them together, and that the music video for Rainier Fog's first single, "The One You Know" is the first chapter of molding Mason's film and the band's music videos together.

In June 2018, DuVall said in an interview with Swedish website Rocksverige that the music video for "The One You Know" is the first chapter of what the band is hoping that will be visuals for all of ten songs from Rainier Fog, and in addition to that, will be a companion piece to the film that director Adam Mason was shooting. The music video for Alice in Chains' single "Never Fade", also directed by Mason, was released on November 1, 2018 and continued the storyline from the video of "The One You Know".

Besides the music of Alice in Chains, director Adam Mason said that the inspiration for the film was a combination of the homeless problem in Los Angeles and what's happening with immigration in the past few years. "It's not really a political movie, it's just whenever I hear the term ‘illegal alien’ I immediately start to wonder if extraterrestrial aliens would be welcome here. And the answer is probably ‘f**k no!’".

Mason said that when Cantrell talked to him about the themes of the album, a lightbulb went off in his head, because the day before he was walking home from his office, saw a bunch of homeless people living in their cars and started to have this idea about a couple of homeless aliens, hiding on earth in human bodies trying to get home. "I literally just saw the whole thing in my head, knew that Paul Sloan had to play the main dude, and Viktoriya Dov his daughter... and they'd be living together out of my old Ford Bronco I've been driving for years. I drew a great deal of inspiration from what Jerry told me about the lyrics. There's a lot of stuff in the album about the concept of hiding behind a mask, and not really knowing what you're getting. There’s a lot of stuff going on in the world right now that I think fed into their album, and then by osmosis into our movie."

Mason stated that the influences for Black Antenna were films such as Starman, Blade Runner, Under The Skin, American Honey and Pinocchio, as the female character, Beta is an alien who dreams of being human just like Pinocchio. Mason also said that he always saw Black Antenna as this indie movie prequel to a big movie like Independence Day. "When our little movie ends, a huge movie like that would begin. This is the origin story of a blockbuster, basically", he said.

== Web-series ==
A web-series focused on each song from the album was released in 2019. Episodes 1 and 2, "The One You Know" and "Rainier Fog", respectively, were released on YouTube on March 7, 2019. Episode 3, "Red Giant", premiered exclusively on Syfy Wire on March 21, 2019. Episode 4, "Fly", was released on YouTube on April 4, 2019, episode 5, "Drone" on April 18, 2019, and episode 6, "Deaf Ears Blind Eyes" premiered exclusively on Kerrang! magazine website on May 2, 2019. Episode 7, "Maybe" was released on YouTube on May 23, 2019, episode 8, "So Far Under" premiered on June 6, 2019, episode 9, "Never Fade", on June 27, 2019, and episode 10, "All I Am", on July 17, 2019.
