= The Reckoning (EP) =

EP by Comes with the Fall
- Released: 2006
- Genre: Alternative rock, hard rock
- Length: 19:33
- Label: DVL

Comes with the Fall chronology
| Live Underground 2002 (2003) | The Reckoning (2006) | Beyond the Last Light (2007) |

The Reckoning is the first EP by American rock band Comes with the Fall.

== Track listing ==
All lyrics and music by William Duvall, except where noted.

| No. | Title | Music | Length |
|---|---|---|---|
| 1. | "Rockslide" | | 2:52 |
| 2. | "Escape the Crime" | Davies/DuVall/Stanger | 2:22 |
| 3. | "Evil Rising" | Constantine/Duvall | 3:16 |
| 4. | "The Reckoning" | Davies/DuVall/Stanger | 4:25 |
| 5. | "Chameleon Blues" | | 6:38 |

== Personnel ==
Comes with the Fall

- Bevan Davies – drums
- William DuVall – vocals, guitar
- Adam Stanger – bass guitar

Additional performers

- Noah Pine – piano on "Chameleon Blues"

Production

- Produced by William DuVall
- Engineered by Jeff Bakos
- Mastered by Stephan Marsh
