= Comes with the Fall =

American rock band

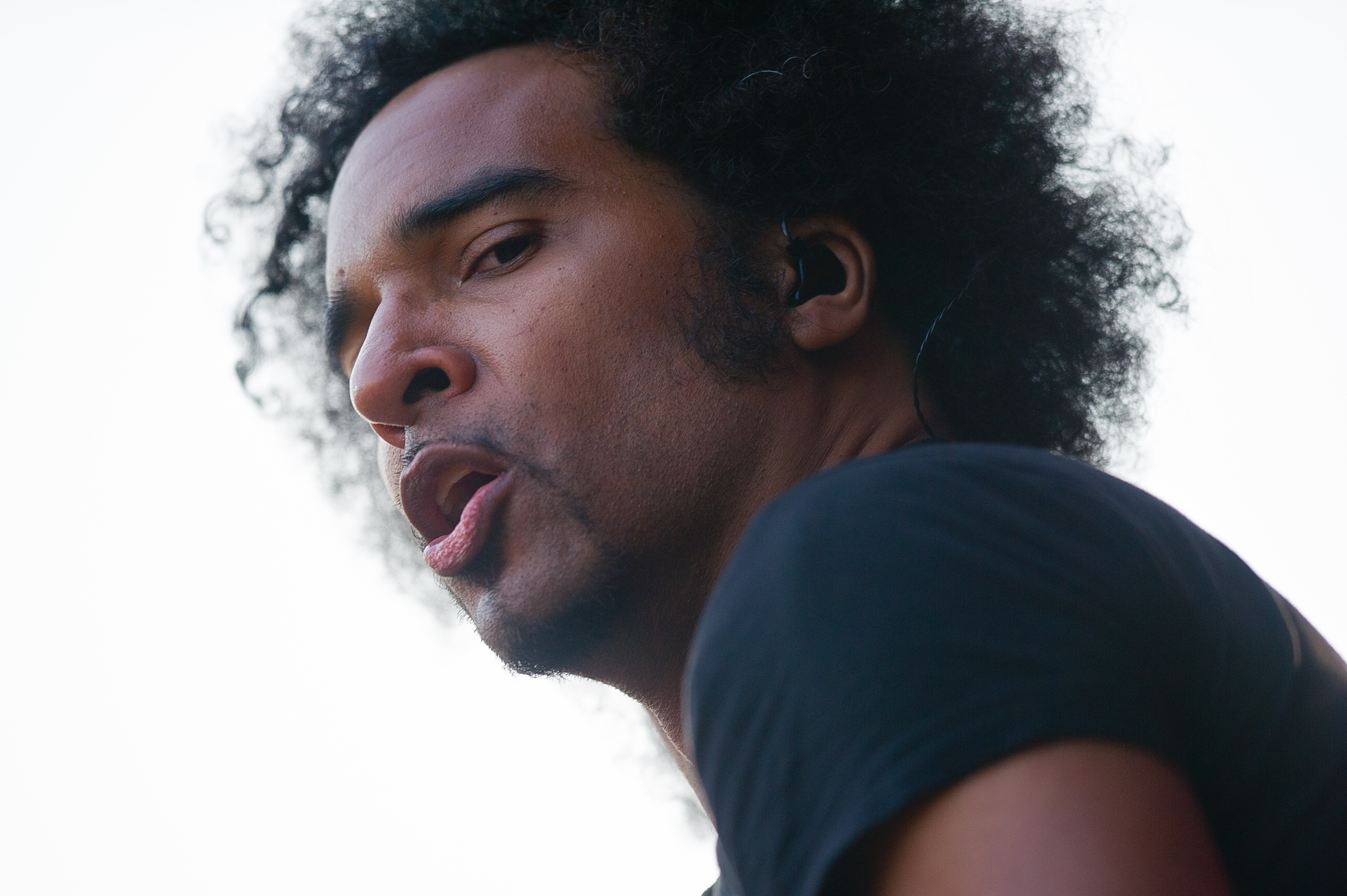
- Frontman William DuVall in 2010

Background information
- Origin: Atlanta, Georgia, U.S.
- Genres: Hard rock, alternative rock
- Years active: 1999–2008 (on hiatus)
- Label: DVL
- Members: William DuVall; Adam Stanger; Bevan Davies
- Past members: Nico Constantine
- Website: comeswiththefall.com

Comes with the Fall is an American hard rock band from Atlanta, Georgia, formed in 1999. Since 2001, the lineup has been composed of William DuVall (lead vocals, guitar), Adam Stanger (bass), and Bevan Davies (drums, percussion). Nico Constantine was the band's second guitarist before departing in 2001. They served as Jerry Cantrell's backing band in support of his solo album Degradation Trip in 2002, while DuVall joined Alice in Chains as lead singer during the band's reunion concerts in 2006, becoming an official member in 2008. The band's name is from the cult horror classic Rosemary's Baby that an investigating Mia Farrow spells out on Scrabble pieces.

To date, Comes with the Fall have released three studio albums—Comes with the Fall (2000), The Year Is One (2001), and Beyond the Last Light (2007); one EP—The Reckoning (2006); and one live album—Live 2002.

== History ==
=== Early years, formation, and Comes with the Fall (1996–2000) ===
In 1996, William DuVall formed the "over-the-top glam-pop" band Madfly, in Atlanta, Georgia, with guitarist Nico Constantine, bassist Jeffery Blount and drummer Bevan Davies. After releasing two albums, Get the Silver and White Hot in the Black, the band became Comes with the Fall in 1999 with Adam Stanger replacing Jeffery Blount on bass. DuVall described the band's sound as "Jeff Buckley being molested by Black Sabbath". The band name derives from the film Rosemary's Baby: Rosemary comes up with the words while trying to figure out an anagram (involving her mysterious neighbors who turn out to be Satanists) using Scrabble pieces.

The group recorded their self-titled album in Atlanta, a year later, before relocating to Los Angeles, California after playing all the clubs in Atlanta and citing a lack of "infrastructure in Atlanta to support what [the band] were trying to do." Within a month of moving to Los Angeles, Alice in Chains guitarist Jerry Cantrell, who introduced himself as a fan of the band, joined them onstage for several shows. Their self-titled album was released the same year through DuVall's DVL Records.

=== The Year Is One and Jerry Cantrell (2001–2005) ===
By 2001, Constantine had left the band, to form Program the Dead, while Comes with the Fall were announced as the main support, along with Udora, for Jerry Cantrell's solo tour. When Cantrell's then solo band mates, bassist Robert Trujillo and drummer Mike Bordin, were unavailable for shows, he enlisted Stanger and Davies to perform as his backing band. They toured with Cantrell throughout 2001.

The Year Is One, the band's second album, was released later in the year to positive reviews. The following year, Comes with the Fall were announced to be Cantrell's opening and backing band for his tour in support of Degradation Trip, Cantrell's second solo album. Prior to the start of the tour, Alice in Chains singer Layne Staley was found dead in his condominium on April 20, 2002. When questioned during an interview about how it affected the band, DuVall stated:

'[W]hen Layne died, it was tough because we were just about to go out on the road, and had to play through. [...] I lost my grandfather in the same week, so Cantrell and I both hit the road with immense personal losses dogging us. There were times on stage -- there was one show in Charlotte where it was just so heavy. I'm holding back tears onstage, and Jerry would start crying onstage too a lot at that point, and a lot of times we would just look at each other when we were singing the stuff because it was the only way...it was heavy. I can't quantify it really in words.'

Comes with the Fall toured with Cantrell throughout 2002, while they released a live album, titled Live 2002, the same year.

In 2003, Comes with the Fall toured with Atlantic group Dropsonic. During the tour, Davies left the group to join Danzig, with drummer Brian Hunter doing double duty performing with Dropsonic and Comes with the Fall. Though Davies was announced as an official member of Danzig, he would still be a member of Comes with the Fall with DuVall stating that his departure was only temporary. The band released the live DVD Live Underground 2002 towards the end of the year and planned to record and release a new album by 2004.

Davies recorded an album with Danzig in 2004, titled Circle of Snakes, which was released on August 31 the same year. The following year, Davies, along with Eric Dover, joined Cardboard Vampyres, a cover band formed by Jerry Cantrell and Billy Duffy before joining The Mercy Clinic, formed by Patrick Lachman.

=== Alice in Chains, The Reckoning, Beyond the Last Light, and hiatus (2006–present) ===
In November 2005, DuVall stated that Comes with the Fall had completed a new album, with a working title of Beyond the Last Light, and hoped to have it released in January 2006. They previewed songs from the album on their MySpace, in February 2006 while DuVall, along with various singers, performed with Alice in Chains, who had reunited to perform a benefit concert for victims of the tsunami disaster previously, at a tribute concert for Heart, singing "Rooster" with Ann Wilson.

When Alice in Chains were to tour in tribute to Staley, DuVall was invited to front the group for the dates. Comes with the Fall released the EP The Reckoning, and was released the summer of the same year.

In February 2007, the band announced their first tour dates in three-and-a-half years, performing material from the EP as well as their unreleased album. They released Beyond the Last Light the same year to positive reviews, with Greg Prato of Allmusic stating that "[m]usically, Comes with the Fall certainly has a soft spot for the big riff thang (DuVall also supplies six-string in the band), as evidenced by the Kyuss-esque "Rockslide" and the Audioslave-ish "Pale Horse Rider."" and that they were "a rock band in the early 21st century that won't sound out of place on rock radio, but that you also won't be embarrassed to admit liking"

The same year, DuVall fronted Alice in Chains on the "ReEvolution Tour" with Velvet Revolver while Davies temporarily joined Static-X, filling in for injured drummer Nick Oshiro, as well as Invitro, filling in for Bennie Cancino on the Family Values Tour. With all members active in other projects, Stanger is performing with The Young Royals, Comes with the Fall were effectively put on hiatus.

By 2008, DuVall had become an official member of Alice in Chains, releasing Black Gives Way to Blue, their fourth album and first since 1995's Alice in Chains, on September 29, 2009.

== Band members ==
- William DuVall – vocals, guitar (1999–present)
- Adam Stanger – bass (1999–present)
- Bevan Davies – drums, percussion (1999–present)

Former members

- Nico Constantine – guitar (1999–2001)

Touring musicians

- Brian Hunter – drums (2003)

== Discography ==
Studio albums

- Comes with the Fall (2000)
- The Year Is One (2001)
- Beyond the Last Light (2007)

Extended plays

- The Reckoning (2006)

Live albums

- Live 2002 (2002)

== Videography ==
Release date	Title	Label
2003	Live Underground 2002	DVL
