= The Year Is One =

Studio album by Comes with the Fall
- Released: 2001
- Genre: Alternative rock, hard rock
- Length: 40:50
- Label: DVL

Comes with the Fall chronology
Comes with the Fall (2000)	The Year Is One (2001)	Live 2002 (2002)

The Year Is One is the second studio album by American rock band Comes with the Fall, released in 2001. Guitarist Nico Constantine amicably parted ways with the band before recording began to pursue other interests, however, he is credited for co-writing the music to the opening track "Murder Scene". This is the first album Comes with the Fall recorded as a trio, which has been the lineup ever since.

== Reception ==
Critic David Fricke of Rolling Stone wrote:

Sounding like rap metal and bubble punk never happened, The Year Is One (DVL Recordings, CD) by the L.A. power trio Comes With The Fall is a record of vintage kicks: fat melodic riffing and heroically sung vocals. It's no accident that ex-Alice in Chains guitarist Jerry Cantrell has used CWTF as his backing band on tour. On their own, singer-guitarist-songwriter William DuVall, bassist Adam Stanger and drummer Bevan Davies actually sound like Alice unchained, firing up the thumping classicism of "Murder Scene" and "So Cruel" with wholly modern pop heart. "We're gonna hijack time/We're gonna raise the dead," DuVall promises in "So Divine," howling like an improbable mix of Jimi Hendrix and Deep Purple's Ian Gillan. Perfectly titled for an era of rebuilding, this is a great rock record for and about starting over.

== Track listing ==
All music and lyrics by William DuVall, except where noted.

No.	Title	Music	Length
1.	"Murder Scene"	Constantine/DuVall	3:10
2.	"Unbreakable"		3:36
3.	"So Cruel"		4:12
4.	"Strung Out on a Dream"		3:45
5.	"Since I Laid Eyes on You"		4:17
6.	"So Divine"		3:08
7.	"Waiting Out the Breakdown"		4:15
8.	"Smashdown"		3:45
9.	"Take It Out on Me"		3:31
10.	"Never See Me Cry"		7:11

== Personnel ==
Comes with the Fall

- Bevan Davies – drums
- William DuVall – vocals, guitar
- Adam Stanger – bass guitar

Production

- Produced by William DuVall
- Engineered by Dave Dunn and Russell Fowler, assisted by Howard Karp
- Mixed by Russell Fowler and Howard Karp
- Mastered by Stephen Marsh
- Liner notes – Ken McIntyre
- Design – Joe Foster
- Artwork and Photography – Jeremy Baile and Darryl Schiff
