= Eric Michael Cole =

American actor, producer, and editor

- Born: September 21, 1976 (age 49); Sacramento, California, U.S.
- Occupations: Actor; producer; editor
- Years active: 1995–present

Eric Michael Cole (born September 21, 1976) is an American actor, producer, and editor.

== Early life ==
Cole was born in Sacramento, California. He grew up in the Pacific Northwest, living in Hillsboro, Oregon, and Vancouver, Washington.

== Career ==
His break-through role was in White Squall (1996) directed by Ridley Scott. Cole appeared in the television film Gia (1998) with Angelina Jolie. Additionally, he starred in, co-produced and edited In Memory of My Father (2005).

In 2018, he appeared on the Alice in Chains music videos "The One You Know" and "Never Fade".

== Filmography ==
Film
Year	Title	Role	Notes
1995	Mr. Holland's Opus	Boy 2	
1996	White Squall	Dean Preston	
1997	Jesus Rides Shotgun	Porn PA	
1999	Last Call	Nico	
1999	Trash	Anthony DeMarie	
1999	The Auteur Theory	Ingemar – The Crap Shoot of Life	
1999	Little Savant	David	
1999	Fixations	Ron	
2000	Tempest Eye	Tierney	
2002	Snapshots	Larry (30 years old)	
2002	New Best Friend	Warren	
2005	In Memory of My Father	Eric	
2005	Lost in Plainview	Alex	
2014	Sunken City	Todd Mueller	
2015	Hangman	Hangman	
2015	The Runaway	Mavrick	
2016	Good Grief	Ricky	
2019	Black Antenna		
2025	Like Father Like Son	Frankie	

Television
Year	Title	Role	Notes
1996	Undue Influence	Danny Vega	Television film
1998	Outrage	Jeffrey Bateman	Television film
1998	Gia	T.J.	Television film
2000	Batman Beyond	Kneejerk (voice)	Episode: "April Moon"
2008	Sons of Anarchy	Poser	Episode: "Patch Over"
2009	Southland	Arrestee	Episode: "Unknown Trouble"
2009	Law & Order	Brad Toshack	Episode: "All New"
2011	The Cape	Noodle	2 episodes
2013	Air Force One Is Down	Bureaucrat	Miniseries; 2 episodes
