= Bevan Davies =

American drummer

- Genres: Hard rock, heavy metal
- Occupation: Drummer
- Years active: 1990–present
- Labels: Blackheart, DVL, Evilive
- Website: bevandavies.com

Bevan Davies is an American musician best known as the drummer for the hard rock and heavy metal bands Madfly, Comes with the Fall, and Danzig, and for forming the band MonstrO. He has also served as touring drummer for Jerry Cantrell, Static-X, and Engelbert Humperdinck, among numerous others.Since Sept 2015, Bevan has been touring with Zoso - The Ultimate Led Zeppelin Experience

== Biography ==
=== Early career ===
Bevan Davies began his musical career as the drummer for Still Rain in the early 1990s. When the band split in 1995, Davies formed the band Mouthpiece, appearing on an EP in 1996 before leaving the group. He then joined Madfly which also included singer William DuVall. The band released the albums Get the Silver and White Hot in the Black. After some lineup changes, the band changed its name to Comes with the Fall in 1999 and released a self-titled album under that name the following year.

In 2001, Comes with the Fall served as an opening act for a solo tour by Jerry Cantrell. On dates when Cantrell's drummer Mike Bordin was unavailable, Davies filled in. Davies appeared on Comes with the Fall's subsequent albums The Year is One in 2002 and Beyond the Last Light in 2007.

=== Later career ===
In 2003, Davies left Comes with the Fall temporarily to join Danzig, and appeared on the 2004 album Circle of Snakes. He toured with the band throughout 2005 and again temporarily in 2010. During this period Davies was recruited to be the touring drummer for Engelbert Humperdinck and formed the cover band Cardboard Vampyres with Cantrell and Billy Duffy. Davies was also briefly a member of The Mercy Clinic. In 2007 he toured temporarily with Static-X and joined Bloodsimple.

In 2010, Davies formed the band MonstrO with former Bloodsimple bassist Kyle Sanders, former Torche guitarist Juan Montoya, and singer/guitarist Charlie Suarez. The band's self-titled album, produced by DuVall, was released in 2011 and they toured regularly until breaking up in 2013. Davies later appeared in the backing band for Wayne Static, and released a solo album in 2016 featuring numerous guest stars.

== Discography ==
Still Rain	1994	Self-released	Still Rain
Bitter Black Water	1995	Self-released	Still Rain
Get the Silver	1996	Killing Floor Records	Madfly
White Hot in the Black	1998	Blackheart	Madfly
Comes with the Fall	2000	DVL	Comes with the Fall
The Year is One	2001	DVL	Comes with the Fall
Live 2002 (live album)	2002	DVL	Comes with the Fall
Circle of Snakes	2004	Evilive	Danzig
The Reckoning (extended play)	2006	DVL	Comes with the Fall
Beyond the Last Light	2007	DVL	Comes with the Fall
MonstrO	2011	Vagrant	MonstrO
Bevan Davies	2016	Self-Released	Bevan Davies

== Videography ==
Release date	Title	Label
2003	Live Underground 2002	DVL
