= Darri Ingólfsson =

Icelandic actor

- Born: Snævar Darri Ingólfsson; 22 December 1979 (age 46); Reykjavík, Iceland
- Other name: Darri Ingolfsson
- Occupation: Actor
- Years active: 2005–present
- Children: 2

Snævar Darri Ingólfsson (born 22 December 1979) is an Icelandic actor. He is best known for his performance as Oliver Saxon in the TV series Dexter (2013).

He studied drama in London. His film roles include Joshua Tree, 1951: A Portrait of James Dean (2012), Money Monster (2016), and Black Antenna (2019). His television roles include Last Resort (2012–2013), Sequestered (2014), The Originals (2017), and National Treasure: Edge of History (2022–2023). In 2018, he appeared on the Alice in Chains' music video "Never Fade".

== Personal life ==
Darri is married and has two children.

== Filmography ==
=== Film ===
Year	Work	Role	Notes
2005	The Search for the Northwest Passage	Gotfred Hansen	
2005	The Girl in the Café	Icelandic waiter	uncredited
2006	Red Canopy	Wilksey	
2006	Flags of Our Fathers	Wounded Marine	as Darrin Ingolfsson
2008	Mannaveiðar		
2009	Committed	Þórir	short film
2010	Messenger	Páll Baldvinsson	
2011	The Girl with the Dragon Tattoo	Karlstad Police Officer	uncredited
2012	I Have No Hold on You	Alex	short film
2012	Joshua Tree, 1951: A Portrait of James Dean	James DeWeerd	
2012	Escape	Man	
2013	Hotel Pennsylvania	Gunnar	short film
2013	The Rookery	Wilksey	short film
2014	Brave Men's Blood	Hannes	
2016	Money Monster	Joji	
2017	The Hatred	Doctor	
2018	He's Watching	Michael	
2018	The Clinic	Cal	
2019	Black Antenna	Nil	

=== Television ===
Year	Work	Role	Notes
2008	Mannaveiðar		TV series
2011–2012	Canvassing!	Marcos	7 episodes
2012–2013	Last Resort	Robert Mitchell	7 episodes
2013	Dexter	Oliver Saxon	7 episodes
2013	Haven	Jack Driscoll	Episode: "Crush"
2014	NCIS: Los Angeles	Dr. Milhouse	Episode: "One More Chance"
2014	Sequestered	Malcolm Miller	8 episodes
2014	Stalker	Chad Hewitt	Episode: "Skin"
2015	Criminal Minds	Jerry Tidwell	Episode: "Beyond Borders"
2016	Castle	Austin Elektra	Episode: "G.D.S."
2016	NCIS: New Orleans	Karl Baptiste	Episode: "Second Line"
2016	Rizzoli & Isles	Robert Stevens	Episode: "Shadow of Doubt"
2017	The Originals	Dominic	4 episodes
2018	S.W.A.T.	Christian Baty	Episode: "Hoax"
2019	The Orville	Greg	Episode: "Lasting Impression"
2019	Hicksters	Bjorn	Filming
2022–2023	National Treasure: Edge of History	Dario	4 episodes
