= Comes with the Fall (album) =

Studio album by Comes with the Fall
- Released: 2000
- Genre: Alternative rock, hard rock
- Length: 34:45
- Label: DVL

Comes with the Fall chronology
Comes with the Fall (2000)	The Year Is One (2001)

Comes with the Fall is the debut studio album by American rock band Comes with the Fall. It is the only album they recorded as a quartet with second guitarist Nico Constantine, who was also a member back when the band was known as Madfly. The album was recorded in Atlanta, before the group relocated to Los Angeles, and released through William DuVall's DVL Records.

== Track listing ==
All lyrics are written by William DuVall

No.	Title	Music	Length
1.	"We Come Undone"	Duvall	3:57
2.	"The Three Wishes"	Constantine/Duvall	3:57
3.	"No Need to Wonder"	Duvall	5:07
4.	"Scarab"	DuVall	3:03
5.	"Blackest Hour"	Constantine/Davies	3:28
6.	"Smoke and Mirrors"	DuVall	3:54
7.	"Unhinged"	Constantine/Davies/DuVall/Stanger	3:02
8.	"Before the Fall"	Constantine/DuVall	7:57

== Personnel ==
Comes with the Fall

- Nico Constantine – guitar
- Bevan Davies – drums
- William DuVall – vocals, guitar
- Adam Stanger – bass guitar

Production

- Produced by William DuVall
- Mixed by Robert Hannon, Russ Fowler
- Mastered by Rodney Mills
