= William DuVall =

American rock musician (born 1967)

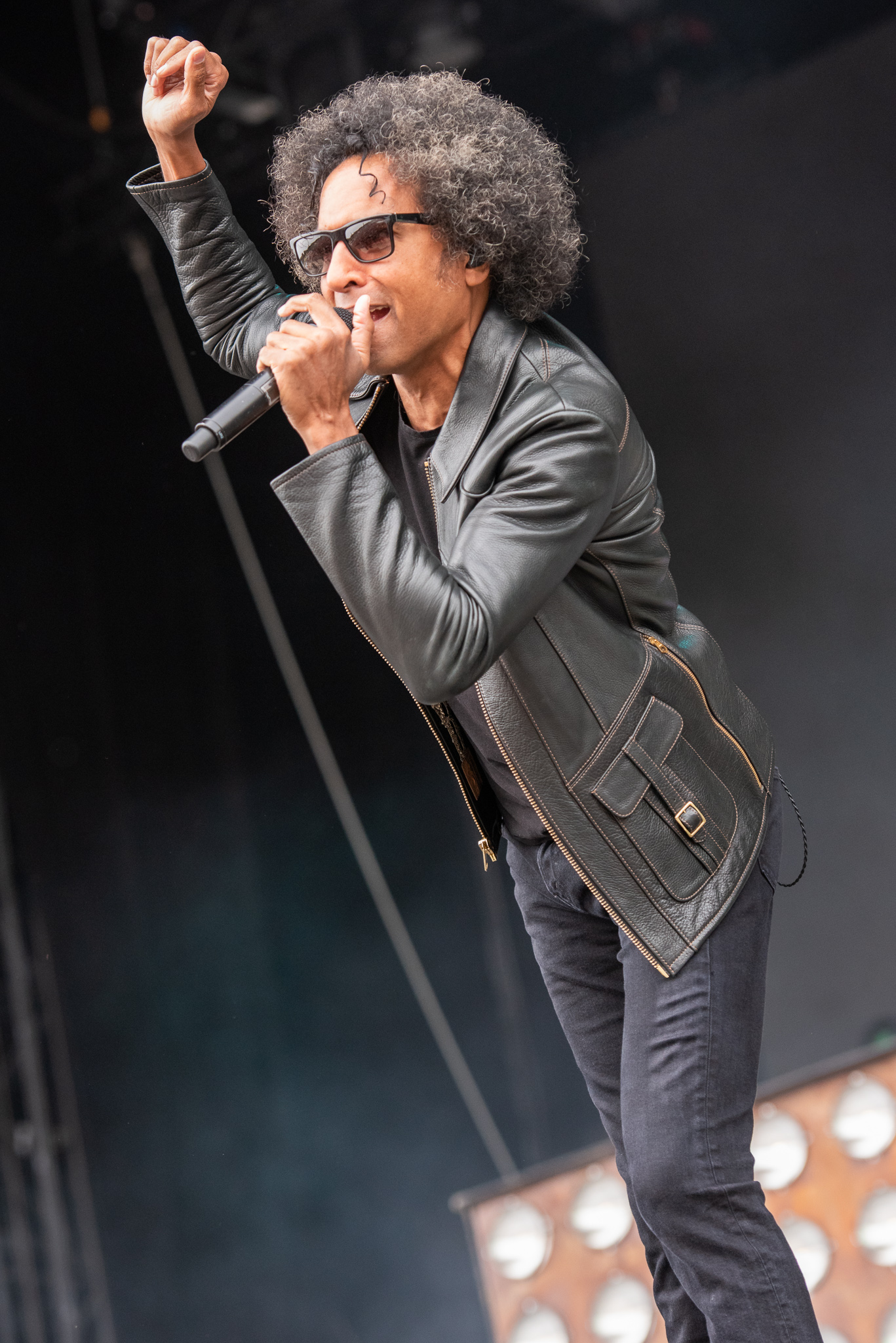
- DuVall performing with Alice in Chains in 2019

Background information
- Born: William Bradley DuVall; September 6, 1967 (age 59); Washington, D.C., U.S.
- Genres: Alternative metal; hard rock; grunge; alternative rock; heavy metal
- Occupations: Singer; musician; songwriter; record producer
- Instruments: Vocals; guitar
- Years active: 1983–present
- Member of: Alice in Chains; Comes with the Fall; Giraffe Tongue Orchestra
- Formerly of: Awareness Void of Chaos; Final Offering; Neon Christ; Bl'ast; No Walls; Madfly
- Website: williamduvall.com

William Bradley DuVall (born September 6, 1967) is an American musician. He has been the co-lead vocalist and rhythm guitarist of the rock band Alice in Chains since 2006, sharing vocal duties with Jerry Cantrell. DuVall joined Alice in Chains after original lead singer Layne Staley's death and has recorded three albums with the band: 2009's Black Gives Way to Blue, 2013's The Devil Put Dinosaurs Here, and 2018's Rainier Fog. He won an ASCAP Pop Music Award for co-writing the song "I Know" for Dionne Farris in 1996, and has earned three Grammy Award nominations as a member of Alice in Chains.

DuVall is also co-founder, lead singer, guitarist, and lyricist for Comes with the Fall. Since 2016, he has been the lead vocalist for the supergroup Giraffe Tongue Orchestra. During his career, he has played with many bands, in a variety of genres, an example being the punk rock group Neon Christ. DuVall's first solo album, One Alone, was released in 2019.

== Biography ==
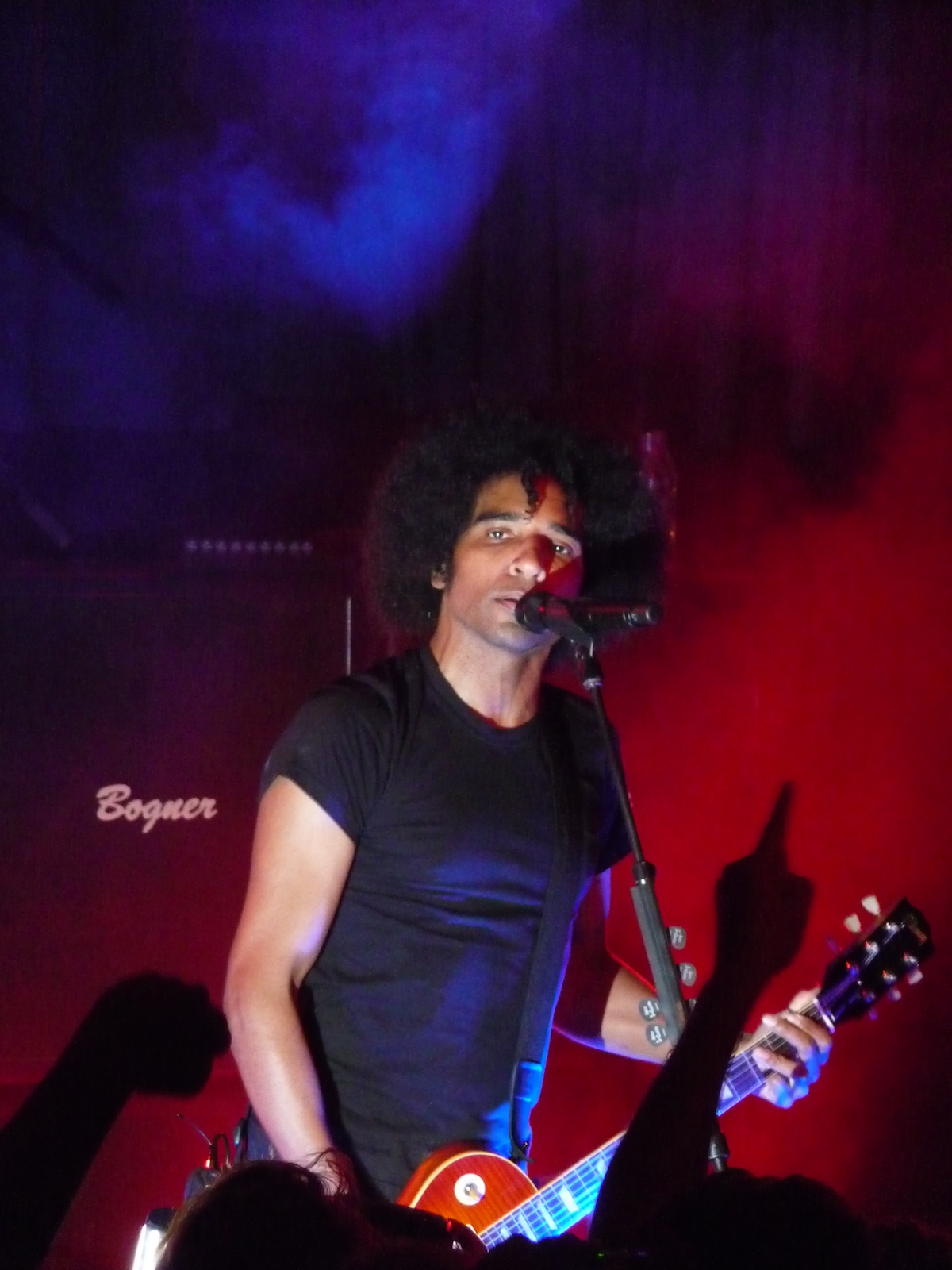
DuVall performing in 2009

=== Early life and career (1983–1992) ===
William Bradley DuVall was born in Washington, D.C., on September 6, 1967. His maternal grandmother was of Dutch and North African descent. When DuVall was fourteen years old, he moved to Atlanta, Georgia with his mother and stepfather, who had taken a job in the city.

DuVall has cited Jimi Hendrix as an early influence after listening to his cousin's copy of Band of Gypsys when he was eight years old and becoming impressed by Hendrix's guitar.

DuVall's music career started in the early 1980s Atlanta hardcore punk scene. His first band was Awareness Void of Chaos.

In 1983, DuVall helped found the controversial Atlanta-based hardcore punk band Neon Christ, contributing guitars and lyrics to the band's albums. Other members of this band were vocalist Randy DuTeau, bassist Danny Lankford, and drummer Jimmy Demer. With a couple of short East Coast tours and two albums, the politically pointed band started gaining popularity. The band used its popularity to support many charitable causes, including working to free Fela Anikulapo Kuti.

Neon Christ disbanded in 1986, reuniting for a one-time show featuring the original members on December 24, 2004. The members were later said to be filming a documentary, which concludes with a February 2, 2008, show at Lawrenceville, Georgia's punk haunt The Treehouse.

After Neon Christ originally broke up, DuVall was briefly the second guitarist in the northern California hardcore punk band Bl'ast, contributing a small bit of writing to their second album, It's in My Blood, released on the hardcore punk–alternative label SST Records, founded by Greg Ginn of hardcore punk band Black Flag. DuVall did not, however, stay with the band long enough to record on the album.

In 1987, DuVall formed the Final Offering with vocalist Randy Gue (a former Neon Christ roadie), Corrosion of Conformity bassist Mike Dean, and drummer Greg Psomas. However, Psomas's heroin habit hindered them from working consistently. Dean would go back to work with Corrosion of Conformity; Psomas died of an overdose in 1994.

DuVall spent the late 1980s with a Hendrix-inspired band, No Walls. Other members of this band were jazz bassist Hank Schroy and drummer Matthew Cowley. DuVall gave a demo tape to Living Colour lead guitarist Vernon Reid backstage at a show on their tour with the Rolling Stones in 1989. Subsequently, Reid brought No Walls into the Black Rock Coalition fold and helped arrange some shows for them in New York. They also recorded a demo at Jimi Hendrix's Electric Lady Studios in New York under Reid's mentorship. No Walls released one self-titled album in 1992 and disbanded the same year.

In the late 1980s, DuVall earned a degree in philosophy with an emphasis on religion from Georgia State University.

=== Madfly, Comes with the Fall, and Jerry Cantrell (1992–2007) ===
In 1994, DuVall, along with Milton Davis, co-wrote the song "I Know" for fellow Atlanta musician Dionne Farris. The track stayed on Billboard's Hot 100 chart for 38 weeks, peaking at No. 4 and earning Farris a nomination for the Grammy Award for Best Female Pop Vocal Performance. DuVall won an ASCAP Pop Music Award for it in 1996.

In the late 1990s, DuVall founded the band Madfly with Nico Constantine, Bevan Davies, and Jeffery Blount. He served as guitarist, singer, and songwriter. Their efforts included two albums: Get the Silver and White Hot in the Black. The former was released on Killing Floor Recordings and the latter through Blackheart Records.

In 1999, DuVall, Bevan, and Nico moved on to form Comes with the Fall, adding Adam Stanger as their bassist. CWTF released their first album, Comes with the Fall, in 2000, and their second, The Year Is One, in 2001.

In early 2000, Comes with the Fall moved to Los Angeles. Within a week of moving to the city, DuVall met Alice in Chains guitarist/vocalist Jerry Cantrell through a mutual acquaintance, who introduced Cantrell to Comes with the Fall's self-titled debut album. Cantrell started hanging out with the band and occasionally joining them onstage. The following year, Comes with the Fall was both the opening act on Cantrell's tour for his second solo album, Degradation Trip, and also the singer's backing band, with DuVall singing Layne Staley's parts at the concerts from 2001 to 2002. While DuVall's band was on tour with Cantrell, Staley died of a drug overdose on April 5, 2002.

=== Alice in Chains and Giraffe Tongue Orchestra (2006–present) ===
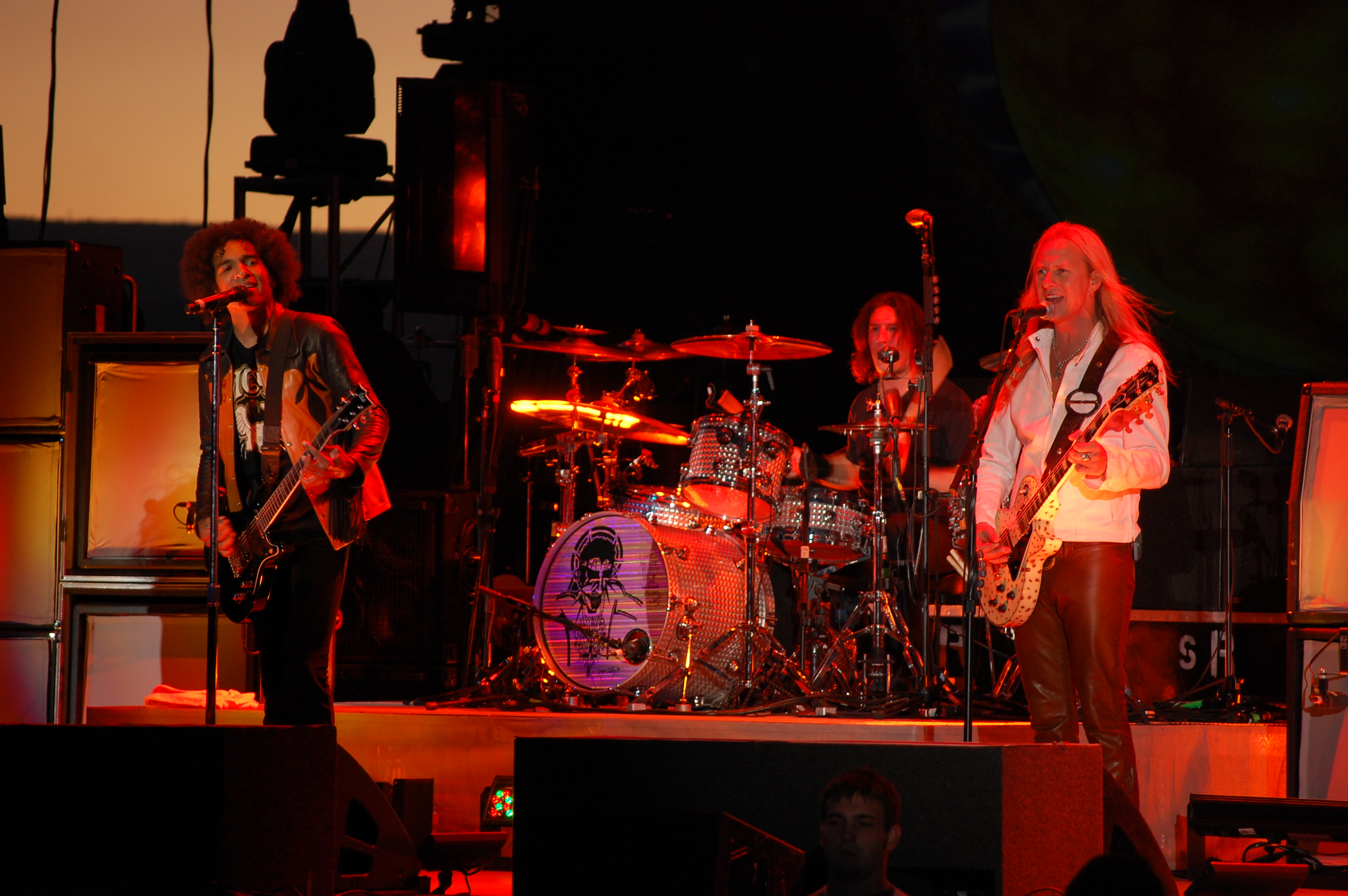
DuVall, Jerry Cantrell, and Sean Kinney performing at an Alice in Chains concert in 2007

DuVall joined Alice in Chains as lead singer during the band's reunion concerts in 2006 and made his first public performance with the band at VH1's Decades Rock Live! concert honoring Heart, in which he sang Alice in Chains' "Rooster". According to Cantrell, it only took one audition for DuVall to get the gig. For his first rehearsal with the band, DuVall sang Alice in Chains' "Love, Hate, Love". After they finished, drummer Sean Kinney looked at his bandmates and said, "I think the search is pretty much over". According to bassist Mike Inez, DuVall didn't try to emulate Staley, and that's what drew them to him. DuVall revealed that Ann Wilson of Heart was supposed to sing "Rooster" at the show, but during the camera blocking rehearsals, he was on stage and Ann hadn't made it downstairs yet, so they said, "Would you sing 'Rooster' for the camera blocking?", and he did. DuVall credits Ann Wilson for giving him a spot on the TV show, because that moment served as the coming-out party for the new incarnation of Alice in Chains.

Initially, Cantrell, and the other veteran members of the band had said the reunion didn't necessarily foretell a future for the band, and that it was just a tribute to Staley and their fans. Kinney went further, saying he would have liked to change the band's name and adding, "I don't see continuing as Alice and replacing somebody." DuVall expressed similar sentiments with regards to the task of filling in for Staley. However, the reformed Alice in Chains generated enthusiasm from fans and convinced the four to keep the name.

In 2007, Alice in Chains began touring with Velvet Revolver and Kill Hannah. The ReEvolution tour was in two parts. The first took in many European cities and the eastern United States. The second part, also referred to as "The Libertad Tour", was primarily a cross-country tour that spread into three cities in Canada. For the first time in fifteen years, Alice in Chains toured Australia as second headliner under Nine Inch Nails on the Soundwave Festival. Around this time, the Alice in Chains website stated that the band—now with DuVall officially noted as lead singer—was working on new material with an album, later known as Black Gives Way to Blue, to be released on September 29, 2009. The recording process was completed on Cantrell's 43rd birthday, which was also the day that DuVall's son was born, on March 18, 2009. On the album, DuVall shares vocal duties with Cantrell, who sings lead vocals on most of the songs. "Last of My Kind" is the only song on the album that features DuVall on lead vocals, without harmonizing with Cantrell. DuVall also wrote the lyrics to the song. DuVall wrote a song called "Tongue Tied" about his friend Sean Costello, who died in 2008, but the track was cut from the album.

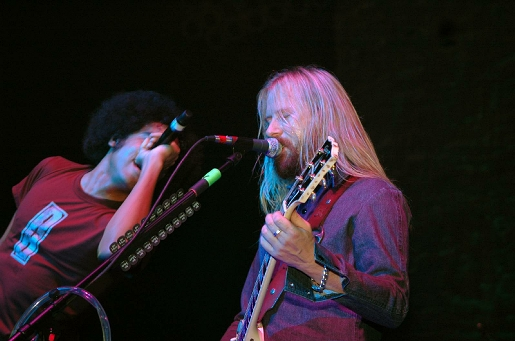
DuVall and Jerry Cantrell performing with Alice in Chains in 2006

In 2011, Alice in Chains took time off after touring more than thirty countries and mourning the death of their original bass player, Mike Starr. However, DuVall stated that there was a possibility of another album in the near future, commenting, "It would be fairly safe to say that you don't come this far and do all this work just to stop for another 15 years."

In March 2011, it was announced that Alice in Chains would begin recording a new album at the tail end of 2011. In May 2013, the album The Devil Put Dinosaurs Here was released. DuVall sings lead vocals on the songs "Hung on a Hook" and "Phantom Limb". He also wrote the lyrics and the guitar solo for the track, the first solo he composed for Alice in Chains.

Cantrell is the primary lead singer of Alice in Chains' post-Staley albums, while DuVall takes Staley's role while performing the band's old songs live.

In 2016, DuVall released the album Broken Lines with the supergroup Giraffe Tongue Orchestra, founded by lead guitarist Ben Weinman of the Dillinger Escape Plan, and also featuring guitarist Brent Hinds of Mastodon, drummer Thomas Pridgen of the Mars Volta, and bassist Wielbert Collinson of Dethklok and Zappa Plays Zappa.

Alice in Chains' sixth studio album (and the third with DuVall), titled Rainier Fog, was released on August 24, 2018. The second single, "So Far Under", was written by DuVall, who also played the guitar solo on the track. The third single, "Never Fade", was co-written by DuVall and Cantrell, who also share lead vocals, with DuVall singing the verses and the pre-chorus, while Cantrell sings the chorus. The song was inspired by the deaths of DuVall's grandmother and the vocalist of Soundgarden, Chris Cornell.

In December 2018, DuVall and Jerry Cantrell were tied at No. 10 on Total Guitar/MusicRadar's "15 best rock guitarists in the world right now" poll.

On January 16, 2019, DuVall, along with Cantrell, Pearl Jam's guitarist Stone Gossard and bassist Jeff Ament, and drummer Josh Freese, performed Soundgarden's "Hunted Down" at the Chris Cornell tribute concert "I Am the Highway".

=== Solo career ===
DuVall released his first solo album, One Alone, on October 4, 2019, through his label DVL. The lead single, "Til The Light Guides Me Home", had its world premiere on BBC Radio 1's Rock Show on July 21, 2019. The second single, "White Hot", was released on October 1, 2019.

The U.S. tour to promote the album started on October 21, 2019, in Atlanta. DuVall also announced a European tour for March and April 2020.

In 2023, DuVall contributed vocals to a new version of the song "This Is Mongol" from the second album by Mongolian folk metal band the Hu, titled Rumble of Thunder. The song is included on the deluxe edition of Rumble of Thunder, released on June 30, 2023.

=== Other ventures ===
DuVall was an extra in the 2001 science fiction film Mimic 2 and had a non-speaking uncredited role in the 2003 film Confidence, starring Ed Burns and Rachel Weisz. He played a bar patron in the opening scene.

DuVall directed a documentary about jazz drummer Milford Graves, titled Ancient to Future: The Wisdom of Milford Graves. As of 2022, the film is listed as being in post-production.

In 2011, the artist reunited with his former Neon Christ bandmates to do a documentary film called All Alone Together: Neon Christ and Atlanta Hardcore, which he said director Edgar Johnson had first pitched to him back in 2005.

In 2008, DuVall performed vocal duties with MC5/DTK at the Meltdown Festival, curated by Massive Attack.

In February 2018, Framus Guitars released the "William DuVall Talisman Signature" model, designed by DuVall himself.

== Personal life ==
DuVall has a son, born on March 18, 2009, the same day he finished recording his first studio album with Alice in Chains, Black Gives Way to Blue.

== Discography ==
Title	Release	Label	Band
Parental Suppression (EP)	1984	Social Crisis Records	Neon Christ
The Knife That Cuts So Deep (EP)	1990	F-King Records	Neon Christ
No Walls (EP)	1992	Third Eye Records	No Walls
Get the Silver	1996	Killing Floor Records	Madfly
White Hot in the Black	1998	Blackheart	Madfly
Comes with the Fall	2000	DVL	Comes with the Fall
The Year Is One	2001	DVL	Comes with the Fall
Live 2002 (live album)	2002	DVL	Comes with the Fall
The Reckoning (EP)	2006	DVL	Comes with the Fall
Beyond the Last Light	2007	DVL	Comes with the Fall
Black Gives Way to Blue	2009	Virgin/EMI	Alice in Chains
The Devil Put Dinosaurs Here	2013	Virgin/EMI	Alice in Chains
Broken Lines	2016	Cooking Vinyl	Giraffe Tongue Orchestra
Rainier Fog	2018	BMG	Alice in Chains
One Alone	2019	DVL	William DuVall
11.12.21 Live-in-Studio Nashville	2022	DVL	William Duvall

== Videography ==
Release date	Title	Label	Band
2003	Live Underground 2002	DVL	Comes with the Fall
2011	Black to Comm	Easy Action	MC5 DTK
TBA	All Alone Together: Neon Christ and Atlanta Hardcore	Social Crisis Films	Neon Christ
