= Alice in Chains discography =

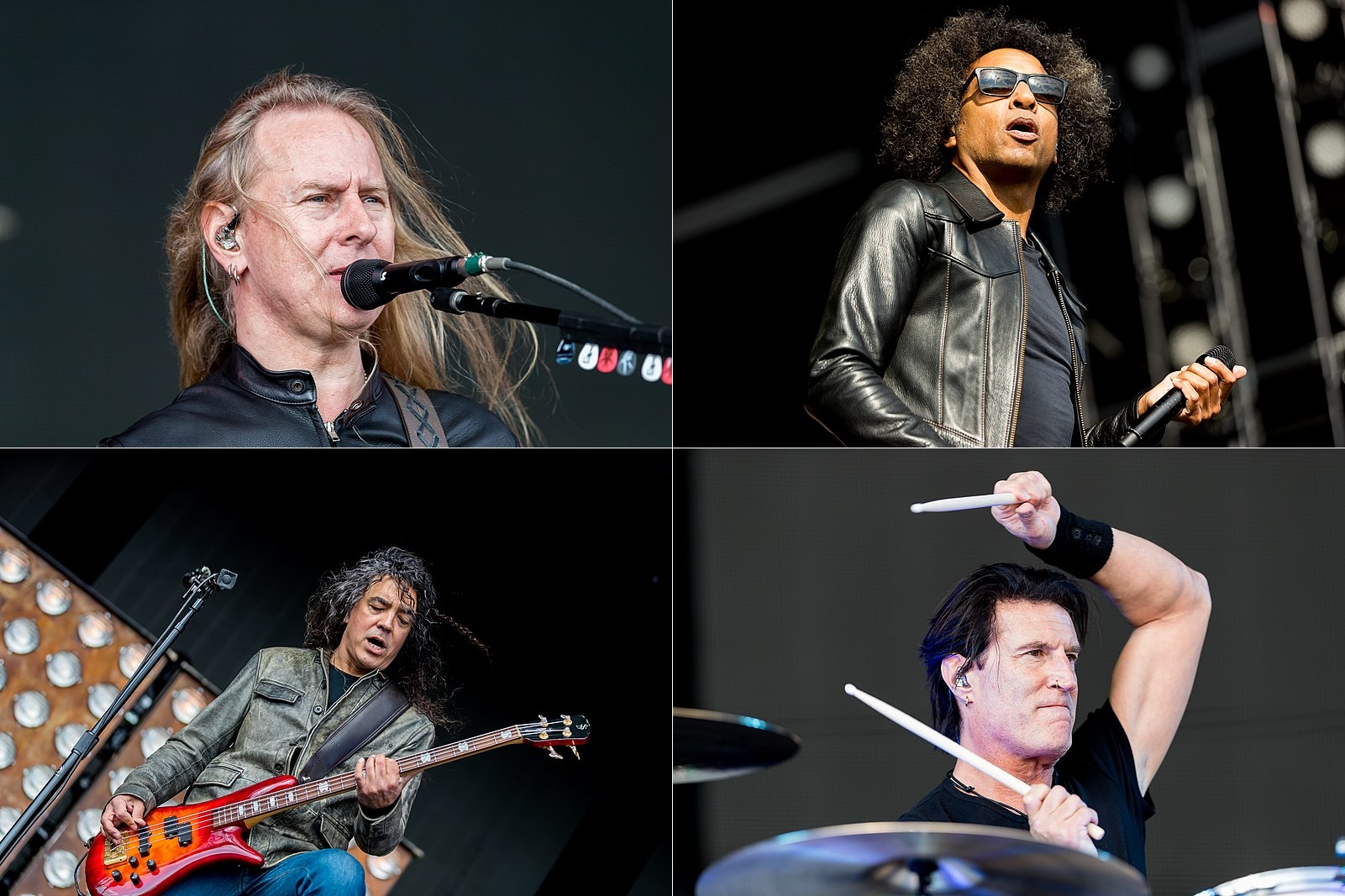
- Alice in Chains in 2019
- Studio albums: 6
- Extended plays: 3
- Soundtrack albums: 6
- Live albums: 3
- Compilation albums: 5
- Singles: 34
- Video albums: 4
- Music videos: 44

The American rock band Alice in Chains has released six studio albums, three extended plays (EP), three live albums, five compilation albums, four video albums, 44 music videos, and 34 singles. Alice in Chains was formed in 1987 by guitarist Jerry Cantrell and drummer Sean Kinney, who then recruited bassist Mike Starr and singer Layne Staley. The band signed to Columbia Records in 1989 and released its first EP, We Die Young, in July 1990. Later that year, the band released its debut studio album, Facelift. The single "Man in the Box", which reached number 18 on the Mainstream Rock chart, helped Facelift achieve double Platinum status. The band toured in support of the album for two years before releasing the acoustic EP Sap in early 1992.

In September 1992, Alice in Chains released Dirt. The critically acclaimed album, also the band's most successful, debuted at number six on the Billboard 200, and was certified quintuple Platinum. The band did not tour in support of Dirt for very long, due to Staley's drug addiction. While touring, Starr left the band for personal reasons and was replaced by Mike Inez. 1994 saw the release of Alice in Chains' second acoustic EP, Jar of Flies. It entered the charts in the top slot, making it the first Alice in Chains release—and the first EP in history—to debut at number one. In 1995, the band released a self-titled album, which debuted at the top of the Billboard 200, and has since been awarded—along with Facelift—double Platinum status while Jar of Flies maintains Quadruple Platinum status. Alice in Chains entered a hiatus after not touring since the release of Dirt.

From 1996 to 2002, the band was mostly inactive, releasing two live albums, including the successful Unplugged, and three compilations. On April 19, 2002, Staley was found dead in his home after overdosing on heroin and cocaine, causing the group to break up. In 2005, the band reunited with new vocalist William DuVall. On April 25, 2009, it was announced that Alice in Chains had signed to Virgin/EMI making it the band's first label change in their 20-plus year career. Black Gives Way to Blue, the group's first album with DuVall, was released on September 29, 2009. In 2011, Alice in Chains began work on their fifth studio album, The Devil Put Dinosaurs Here, which was released on May 28, 2013. Alice in Chains' sixth studio album, Rainier Fog, was released on August 24, 2018. As of 2019, the band has had 18 Top 10 songs and five No. 1 hits on Billboard's Mainstream Rock chart.

== Albums ==
=== Studio albums ===
List of albums, with selected chart positions
Title	Album details	Peak chart positions										Certifications
Title	Album details	US	AUS	CAN	FIN	GER	NLD	NZ	NOR	SWE	UK	Certifications
Facelift	Released: August 28, 1990; Label: Columbia (#46075); Format: CD, cassette, LP	42	38	53	—	41	—	—	—	—	—	RIAA: 3× Platinum; BPI: Silver; RMNZ: Gold
Dirt	Released: September 29, 1992; Label: Columbia (#52475); Format: CD, cassette, LP	6	13	25	—	25	17	36	15	11	36	RIAA: 5× Platinum; ARIA: Platinum; BPI: Gold; CRIA: Platinum; RMNZ: Platinum
Alice in Chains	Released: October 31, 1995; Label: Columbia (#67248); Format: CD, cassette, LP	1	5	5	13	93	75	28	11	11	37	RIAA: 2× Platinum; ARIA: Gold; BPI: Silver; CRIA: Platinum
Black Gives Way to Blue	Released: September 29, 2009; Label: Virgin/EMI; Format: CD, LP, digital download	5	12	4	11	21	34	7	9	20	19	RIAA: Gold; CRIA: Gold
The Devil Put Dinosaurs Here	Released: May 28, 2013; Label: Capitol; Format: CD, LP, digital download	2	10	2	6	23	52	12	6	35	22	
Rainier Fog	Released: August 24, 2018; Label: BMG; Format: CD, LP, digital download	12	15	11	7	8	30	23	20	19	9	
"—" denotes a recording that did not chart or was not released in that territory.

=== Live albums ===
List of live albums, with selected chart positions
Title	Album details	Peak chart positions										Certifications
Title	Album details	US	AUS	CAN	FIN	GER	NLD	NZ	NOR	SWE	UK	Certifications
MTV Unplugged	Released: July 30, 1996; Label: Columbia (#67703); Format: CD, cassette, LP	3	12	9	13	46	33	8	9	7	20	RIAA: 2× Platinum; ARIA: Gold; BPI: Silver; CRIA: Gold
Live	Released: December 5, 2000; Label: Columbia (#85274); Format: CD	142	—	—	—	—	—	—	—	—	—	
Live Facelift	Released: November 25, 2016; Label: Sony Legacy (88985374931); Format: Vinyl	—	—	—	—	—	—	—	—	—	—	
"—" denotes a recording that did not chart or was not released in that territory.

=== Compilation albums ===
List of compilation albums, with selected chart positions
Title	Album details	Peak chart positions					Certifications
Title	Album details	US	AUS	CAN	NZ	UK	Certifications
Jar of Flies/Sap	Released: 1994; Label: Columbia (#4757132); Format: 2-CD	—	2	—	—	4	
Nothing Safe: Best of the Box	Released: June 29, 1999; Label: Columbia (#63649); Format: CD	20	—	37	41	—	RIAA: Platinum; BPI: Gold
Music Bank	Released: October 26, 1999; Label: Columbia (#69580); Format: 3-CD box set	123	—	—	—	—	
Greatest Hits	Released: July 24, 2001; Label: Columbia (#85922); Format: CD, SACD	112	—	—	—	—	RIAA: Platinum
The Essential Alice in Chains	Released: September 5, 2006; Label: Columbia (#92090); Format: 2-CD set	139	187	—	—	—	RIAA: Gold
"—" denotes a recording that did not chart or was not released in that territory.

== Extended plays ==
List of extended plays, with selected chart positions
Title	EP details	Peak chart positions										Certifications
Title	EP details	US	AUT	CAN	GER	NLD	NZ	NOR	SWE	SWI	UK	Certifications
We Die Young	Released: July 1990; Label: Columbia; Format: cassette, LP	—	—	—	—	—	—	—	—	—	—	
Sap	Released: February 4, 1992; Label: Columbia (#67059); Format: CD, cassette, LP	134 (Note: Sap charted in the US upon its vinyl Record Store Day release in 2020.)	—	—	—	—	—	—	—	—	—	US: Gold
Jar of Flies	Released: January 25, 1994; Label: Columbia (#57628); Format: CD, cassette, LP	1	22	5	25	17	1	7	6	31	4	RIAA: 4× Platinum; BPI: Silver; CRIA: 2× Platinum
"—" denotes a recording that did not chart or was not released in that territory.

== Singles ==
List of singles, with selected chart positions
Title	Year	Peak chart positions										Certifications	Album
Title	Year	US	US Main Rock	US Rock	AUS	CAN	EU	FIN	IRL	NLD	UK	Certifications	Album
"We Die Young"	1990	—	—	×	—	—	—	—	—	—	— (Note: "We Die Young…" did not enter the UK Singles Chart, but peaked at number 11 on the UK Physical Singles Chart Top 100.)		We Die Young EP and Facelift
"Man in the Box"	1991	—	18	×	—	—	—	—	—	—	—	RIAA: 3× Platinum; BPI: Silver	Facelift
"Would?"	1992	—	31	15	69	—	77	36	—	33	19	RIAA: 2× Platinum; BPI: Silver	Dirt
"Them Bones"	1992	—	24	× (Note: "Them Bones" did not enter the Hot Rock & Alternative Songs chart, which wasn't introduced until 2009, but peaked at number 30 on the US Alternative Airplay chart.)	93	—	76	38	22	—	26	RIAA: Platinum	Dirt
"Angry Chair"	1992	—	34	× (Note: "Angry Chair" did not enter the Hot Rock & Alternative Songs chart, which wasn't introduced until 2009, but peaked at number 27 on the US Alternative Airplay chart.)	188	—	79	—	28	—	33		Dirt
"Rooster"	1993	—	7	×	121	—	—	—	—	—	—	BPI: Silver; RIAA: 2× Platinum	Dirt
"Down in a Hole"	1993	—	10	×	—	—	—	—	29	—	36	RIAA: Platinum	Dirt
"What the Hell Have I"	1993	—	19	×	—	—	—	—	—	—	—		Last Action Hero: Music from the Original Motion Picture
"No Excuses"	1994	— (Note: "No Excuses" did not chart on the Billboard Hot 100 but charted at number 48 on the Billboard Hot 100 Airplay chart,)	1	× (Note: "No Excuses" did not enter the Hot Rock & Alternative Songs chart, which wasn't introduced until 2009, but peaked at number three on the US Alternative Airplay chart.)	—	17	—	—	—	—	—	RIAA: Gold	Jar of Flies
"Grind"	1995	—	7	× (Note: "Grind" did not enter the Hot Rock & Alternative Songs chart, which wasn't introduced until 2009, but peaked at number 18 on the US Alternative Airplay chart.)	77	53	70	—	—	—	23		Alice in Chains
"Heaven Beside You"	1996	— (Note: "Heaven Beside You" did not chart on the Billboard Hot 100 but charted at number 52 on the Billboard Hot 100 Airplay chart.)	3	× (Note: "Heaven Beside You" did not enter the Hot Rock & Alternative Songs chart, which wasn't introduced until 2009, but peaked at number six on the US Alternative Airplay chart.)	60	—	94	—	—	—	35	RIAA: Gold	Alice in Chains
"Again"	1996	—	8	× (Note: "Again" did not enter the Hot Rock & Alternative Songs chart, which wasn't introduced until 2009, but peaked at number 36 on the US Alternative Airplay chart.)	—	—	—	—	—	—	—		Alice in Chains
"Over Now"	1996	—	4	× (Note: "Over Now" did not enter the Hot Rock & Alternative Songs chart, which wasn't introduced until 2009, but peaked at number 24 on the US Alternative Airplay chart.)	102	50	—	—	—	—	—		Unplugged
"Would?" [airplay]	1996	—	19	×	—	—	—	—	—	—	—		Unplugged
"Get Born Again"	1999	— (Note: "Get Born Again" did not enter the Billboard Hot 100, but peaked at number six on the Bubbling Under Hot 100 Singles chart, which acts as an extension to the Hot 100.)	4	× (Note: "Get Born Again" did not enter the Hot Rock & Alternative Songs chart, which wasn't introduced until 2009, but peaked at number 12 on the US Alternative Airplay chart.)	141	—	—	—	—	—	—		Nothing Safe: Best of the Box
"Man in the Box" (live)	2000	—	39	× (Note: "Man in the Box" (Live) did not enter the Hot Rock & Alternative Songs chart, which wasn't introduced until 2009, but peaked at number 38 on the US Active Rock chart.)	—	—	—	—	—	—	—		Live
"A Looking in View"	2009	— (Note: "A Looking in View" did not enter the Billboard Hot 100, but peaked at number 42 on the US Heatseeker Songs chart.)	12	27	—	—	—	—	—	—	—		Black Gives Way to Blue
"Check My Brain"	2009	92	1	1	—	62	—	—	—	—	—		Black Gives Way to Blue
"Your Decision"	2009	— (Note: "Your Decision" did not enter the Billboard Hot 100, but peaked at number nine on the Bubbling Under Hot 100 Singles chart, which acts as an extension to the Hot 100.)	1	1	—	57	—	—	—	—	—		Black Gives Way to Blue
"Lesson Learned"	2010	—	4	10	—	—	—	—	—	—	—		Black Gives Way to Blue
"Hollow"	2012	—	1	37	—	—	—	—	—	—	—		The Devil Put Dinosaurs Here
"Stone"	2013	—	1	37	—	—	—	—	—	—	—		The Devil Put Dinosaurs Here
"Voices"	2013	—	3	— (Note: "Voices" did not enter the Hot Rock & Alternative Songs chart, but peaked at number 18 on the Hot Rock & Alternative Airplay chart.)	—	—	—	—	—	—	—		The Devil Put Dinosaurs Here
"Tears"	2016	—	—	—	—	—	—	—	—	—	—		Rush - 2112 (40th Anniversary Edition)
"The One You Know"	2018	—	9	36	—	—	—	—	—	—	—		Rainier Fog
"So Far Under"	2018	—	—	—	—	—	—	—	—	—	—		Rainier Fog
"Never Fade"	2018	—	10	— (Note: "Never Fade" did not enter the Hot Rock & Alternative Songs chart, but peaked at number 32 on the Hot Rock & Alternative Airplay chart.)	—	—	—	—	—	—	—		Rainier Fog
"Rainier Fog"	2019	—	20	—	—	—	—	—	—	—	—		Rainier Fog
"—" denotes a recording that did not chart or was not released in that territory. "×" denotes periods where charts did not exist or were not archived

=== Promotional singles ===
List of promotional singles, with selected chart positions
Title	Year	Peak chart positions		Certifications	Album
Title	Year	US Main Rock	US Alt.	Certifications	Album
"Bleed the Freak"	1991	—	—	RMNZ: Gold	Facelift
"Sea of Sorrow"	1991	27	—		Facelift
"Don't Follow"	1994	25	—		Jar of Flies
"I Stay Away"	1994	10	—	RIAA: Gold	Jar of Flies
"Got Me Wrong"	1994	7	22		Sap
"Fear the Voices"	1999	11	—		Music Bank
"—" denotes a recording that did not chart or was not released in that territory. "×" denotes periods where charts did not exist or were not archived

=== Other charted songs ===
List of songs, with selected chart positions
Title	Year	Peak chart positions	Certifications	Album
Title	Year	US Hard Stream.	Certifications	Album
"Nutshell"	2025	14	RIAA: Platinum; RMNZ: 3× Platinum	Jar of Flies

== Soundtracks ==
Year	Song	Album	Comments
1992	"Would?"	Singles: Original Motion Picture Soundtrack	Later appeared on Dirt
1993	"What the Hell Have I?" and "A Little Bitter"	Last Action Hero: Music from the Original Motion Picture	Remixed versions of these songs later appeared on Music Bank
1994	"Them Bones"	Street Fighter II: The Animated Movie English soundtrack	Originally appeared on Dirt
1994	"Got Me Wrong"	Clerks: Music from the Motion Picture	Originally appeared on Sap
1996	"Again"	Marvin's Room soundtrack	Originally appeared on Alice In Chains
2004	"Them Bones"	Riding Giants soundtrack	Originally appeared on Dirt
2004	"Them Bones"	Grand Theft Auto: San Andreas	Originally appeared on Dirt
2008	"Would?"	Burnout Paradise soundtrack	Originally appeared on Dirt
2009	"Rooster"	Terminator Salvation (Original Soundtrack)	Originally appeared on Dirt
2009	"Them Bones"	Madden NFL 10 soundtrack	Originally appeared on Dirt
2025	"Them Bones"	Tony Hawk's Pro Skater 3 + 4 soundtrack	Originally appeared on Dirt

== Music videos ==
Year	Title	Director	Notes
1990	"We Die Young" (version one)	The Art Institute of Seattle	
1990	"We Die Young" (version two)	Rocky Schenck	
1991	"Sea of Sorrow" (version one)	Paul Rachman	
1991	"Man in the Box"	Paul Rachman	
1991	"Sea of Sorrow" (version two)	Martyn Atkins	
1991	"Bleed the Freak (live)"	Josh Taft	From Live Facelift
1992	"Would?"	Cameron Crowe; Josh Taft	
1992	"Them Bones"	Rocky Schenck	
1992	"Angry Chair"	Matt Mahurin	
1993	"Rooster"	Mark Pellington	
1993	"What the Hell Have I?"	Rocky Schenck	
1993	"Down in a Hole"	Nigel Dick	
1994	"No Excuses"	Matt Mahurin	
1994	"I Stay Away"	Nick Donkin	
1995	"Grind"	Rocky Schenck	
1996	"Heaven Beside You"	Frank W. Ockenfels III	
1996	"Again"	George Vale; Layne Staley	
1996	"Over Now" (MTV Unplugged)	Alex Coletti	
1999	"Get Born Again"	Paul Fedor	
2009	"A Looking in View"	Stephen Schuster	
2009	"Check My Brain"	Alexandre Courtes	
2009	"Your Decision"	Stephen Schuster	
2010	"Lesson Learned"	Paul Matthaeus	
2010	"Acid Bubble"	Nick Goso	
2010	"Last of My Kind" (live)		
2013	"Hollow"	Roboshobo	
2013	"Stone"	Roboshobo	
2013	"Voices"	Roboshobo	
2013	"The Devil Put Dinosaurs Here"	Travis Hopkins	
2014	"Phantom Limb"	Roboshobo	
2018	"The One You Know" (version one)	Adam Mason	
2018	"Never Fade"	Adam Mason	
2019	"The One You Know" (version two)	Adam Mason	Episode from Black Antenna
2019	"Rainier Fog"	Adam Mason	Episode from Black Antenna
2019	"Red Giant"	Adam Mason	Episode from Black Antenna
2019	"Fly"	Adam Mason	Episode from Black Antenna
2019	"Drone"	Adam Mason	Episode from Black Antenna
2019	"Deaf Ears Blind Eyes"	Adam Mason	Episode from Black Antenna
2019	"Rainier Fog"	Peter Darley Miller & Alice In Chains	Official music video
2019	"Maybe"	Adam Mason	Episode from Black Antenna
2019	"So Far Under"	Adam Mason	Episode from Black Antenna
2019	"Never Fade"	Adam Mason	Episode from Black Antenna
2019	"All I Am"	Adam Mason	Episode from Black Antenna
2019	"Private Hell"	Todd Shuss	

== Videos ==
Year	Video details	Peak chart positions		Certifications
Year	Video details	US	UK	Certifications
1991	Live Facelift: Released: 1991; Label: Columbia (#49081); Format: VHS	—	11	RIAA: Gold
1995	The Nona Tapes: Released: December 12, 1995; Label: Columbia (#50137); Format: VHS	32	10	
1996	Unplugged: Released: July 24, 1996; Label: Columbia (#50148); Format: VHS, DVD	7	18	RIAA: Gold
1999	Music Bank: The Videos: Released: October 26, 1999; Label: Columbia (#50208); Format: VHS, DVD	11	33	RIAA: Gold
"—" denotes releases that did not chart.

== Guest appearances ==
Year	Song	Artist(s)	Album
2016	"Tears"	Rush	Rush - 2112 (40th Anniversary Edition)
2019	"Would?"	Heart	Live in Atlantic City
2019	"Rooster"	Heart	Live in Atlantic City

== See also ==
- List of songs recorded by Alice in Chains
