= Greatest Hits (Alice in Chains album) =

Greatest hits album by Alice in Chains
- Released: July 24, 2001
- Recorded: 1989–1995
- Genre: Alternative metal; grunge; alternative rock; heavy metal
- Length: 44:35
- Label: Columbia
- Producer: Alice in Chains; Rick Parashar; Dave Jerden; Toby Wright

Alice in Chains chronology
Live (2000)	Greatest Hits (2001)	The Essential Alice in Chains (2006)

Greatest Hits is a greatest hits collection by the American rock band Alice in Chains. It was released on July 24, 2001, by Columbia Records.

== Overview ==
Greatest Hits is the second collection of hit songs by the band, albeit shorter than the previous release, Nothing Safe: Best of the Box. Greatest Hits was certified gold by the RIAA on November 30, 2005. It was the last album released by Alice in Chains before the death of singer Layne Staley in 2002. Mike Starr plays bass on the album's first five songs, while Mike Inez plays bass on the last five.

== Album cover ==
The cover features a photo of boxer Gene Fullmer receiving a crushing right from Neal Rivers during their 10-round bout at Madison Square Garden on November 15, 1957.

== Reception ==
Professional ratings
Review scores
Source	Rating
AllMusic	3/5 stars
The Rolling Stone Album Guide	3/5 stars

The album received a mixed reception from critics, with reviewers criticizing the lack of songs and "Cash grab" nature of the album. AllMusic's Steve Huey called the album "a lower-priced, ten-track sampler of Alice in Chains' career." Bill Adams of Ground Control Magazine questioned the integrity of the album, writing in his review "one has to wonder who this compilation was made for. When it was released in 2001, Alice in Chains had only gone for about six years without a new studio album, and fans had been kept interested with live albums, box sets, and myriad other releases, so why put out something so plainly utilitarian?".

== Track listing ==
No.	Title	Writer(s)	Length
1.	"Man in the Box" (from Facelift)	Layne Staley, Jerry Cantrell	4:47
2.	"Them Bones" (from Dirt)	Cantrell	2:30
3.	"Rooster" (from Dirt)	Cantrell	6:15
4.	"Angry Chair" (from Dirt)	Staley	4:48
5.	"Would?" (from Dirt)	Cantrell	3:28
6.	"No Excuses" (from Jar of Flies)	Cantrell	4:15
7.	"I Stay Away" (from Jar of Flies)	Cantrell, Mike Inez, Staley	4:14
8.	"Grind" (from Alice in Chains)	Cantrell	4:46
9.	"Heaven Beside You" (from Alice in Chains)	Cantrell, Inez	5:29
10.	"Again" (from Alice in Chains)	Cantrell, Staley	4:05
Total length:			44:35

== Personnel ==
Alice in Chains

- Layne Staley – lead vocals, backing vocals on "Grind" and "Heaven Beside You" and guitar on "Angry Chair"; production (2–10)
- Jerry Cantrell – guitar, backing vocals, lead vocals on "Grind" and "Heaven Beside You", co-lead vocals on "No Excuses" and "Would?"; production (2–10)
- Mike Starr – bass (tracks 1–5); production (2–5)
- Mike Inez – bass (tracks 6–10); production (6–10)
- Sean Kinney – drums; production (2–10)

Production

- Dave Jerden – producer (1–4), engineer (1), mixing (1–4)
- Rick Parashar – producer (5), engineer (5), mixing (5)
- Toby Wright – producer (8–10), engineer (6–10), mixing (6–10)
- Bryan Carlstrom – engineer (2–4)
- Tom Nellen – engineer (8–10)
- Ronnie S. Champagne – additional engineer (1)
- Stephen Marcussen – mastering
- Rocky Schenck – photography
- Mary Maurer – art direction
- Marty Temme – photography

== Charts ==
Chart (2001)	Position
US Billboard 200	112

== Certifications ==
Region	Certification	Certified units/sales
United States (RIAA)	Platinum	1,000,000^{‡}
^{‡} Sales+streaming figures based on certification alone.
