= Alice in Chains (album) =

- Yellow-tint cover (Note: The vinyl cover and CD booklet itself is greyscale, while the CD edition of the album came in yellow or purple tinted jewel cases.)

Studio album by Alice in Chains
- Released: October 31, 1995
- Recorded: April–August 1995
- Studios: Bad Animals, Seattle, Washington
- Genres: Grunge; hard rock; sludge metal; doom metal
- Length: 64:47
- Label: Columbia
- Producers: Toby Wright; Alice in Chains

Alice in Chains chronology
Jar of Flies (1994)	Alice in Chains (1995)	Unplugged (1996)

Singles from Alice in Chains
- 1. "Grind" Released: October 6, 1995; 2. "Heaven Beside You" Released: January 29, 1996; 3. "Again" Released: February 1996

Alice in Chains (informally referred to as Tripod, the Dog Album, or the Dog Record) is the third studio album by the American rock band Alice in Chains. It was released on vinyl LP on October 31, 1995, through Columbia Records, and in other formats on November 7. The album is the follow-up to Dirt (1992), the group's commercial breakthrough. Alice in Chains is the group's final album featuring the original lead vocalist Layne Staley, who died in 2002, and their first with bassist Mike Inez, who replaced Mike Starr in 1993.

Alice in Chains had not played live for a year and a half due to Staley's heroin addiction. During the hiatus, Staley joined Mad Season with Mike McCready of Pearl Jam and Barrett Martin of Screaming Trees to record the album Above (1995), leaving the future of Alice in Chains in question. Staley's growing addiction led to rumors of his death. Shortly after the release of Above, Alice in Chains began work on their third album, with the intention of ending speculation on their break-up.

The album was recorded from April to August 1995 at Bad Animals Studio in Seattle with producer Toby Wright. The songs focus on emotional subjects such as drug addiction, depression, spirituality, broken relationships and the tensions within the band fueled by Staley's substance abuse. Rather than relying on heavy metal riffs, the material places more emphasis on melody and texturally varied arrangements, some of which integrate the acoustic moods of their earlier extended plays (EPs), while others introduce late-1960s and early-1970s rock influences.

Alice in Chains was released during the decline of the grunge era. Staley's addiction prevented the band from touring, and they only performed for televised events and while opening for Kiss. Nevertheless, the album debuted at number one on the Billboard 200 and stayed on the chart for nearly a year. The tracks "Grind", "Heaven Beside You" and "Again" were released as singles. "Grind" and "Again" were nominated for the Grammy Award for Best Hard Rock Performance. Alice in Chains was certified double platinum by the RIAA and sold over three million copies worldwide. Staley died from a drug overdose in 2002 and Alice in Chains did not release another album until 2009 when, with new co-vocalist William DuVall, they released Black Gives Way to Blue.

== Background ==
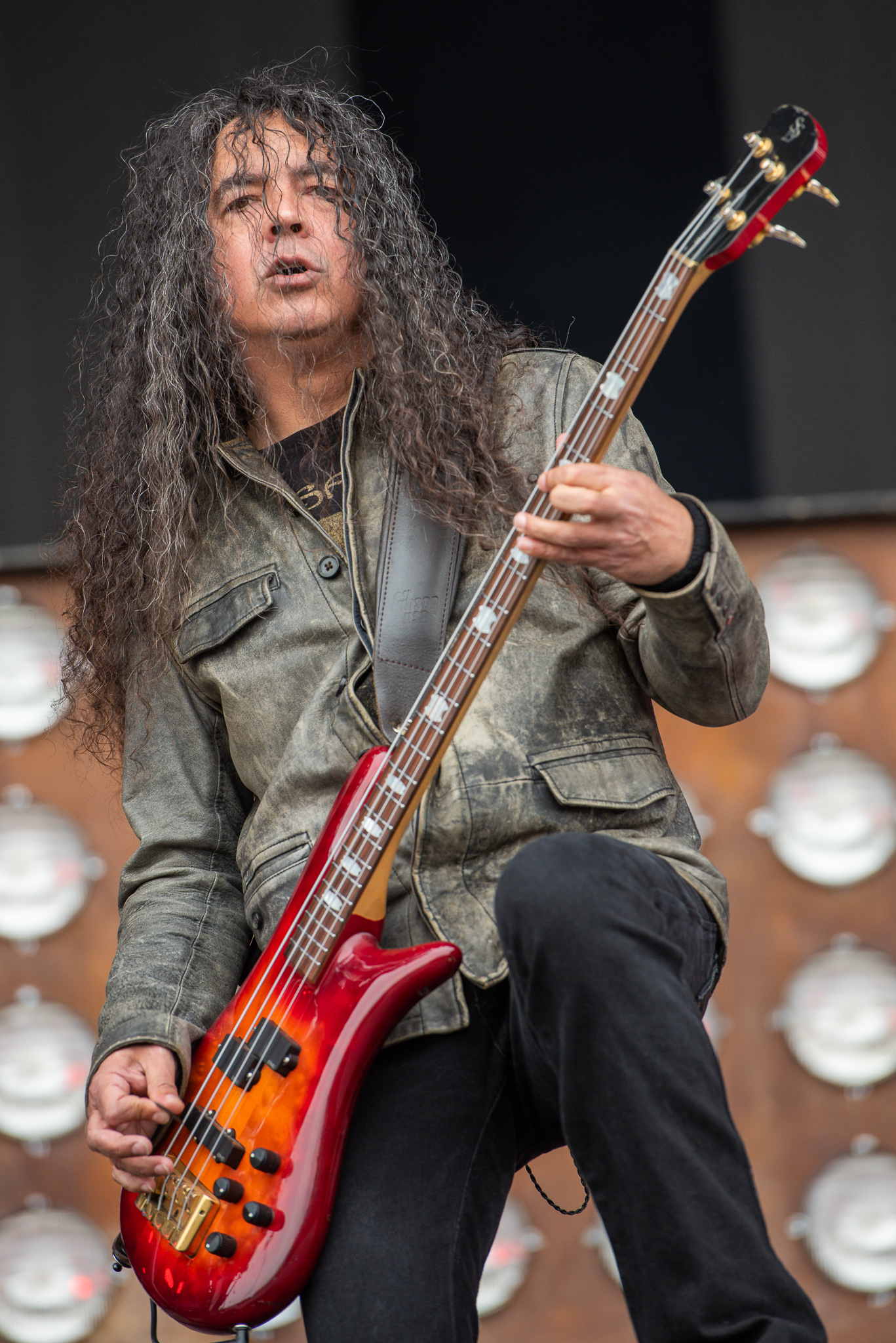
Alice in Chains was the band's first full-length album to feature bassist Mike Inez (pictured 2019).

Alice in Chains released their second album, Dirt, which became their commercial breakthrough, in September 1992. It entered the top ten of the Billboard 200 in its first week of release. During the supporting tour, bassist Mike Starr was fired due to addiction problems, and was replaced by Ozzy Osbourne's live bassist Mike Inez. Following the tour, the band decided to take a break from their heavy recordings with Jar of Flies, a largely acoustic extended play (EP). Upon its release in January 1994, Jar of Flies debuted at number one on the Billboard 200.

After the release of Jar of Flies, Staley entered rehab for heroin addiction, and drummer Sean Kinney struggled with alcoholism. Alice in Chains had been scheduled to join Metallica's Shit Hits the Sheds Tour during mid-1994, including a performance at Woodstock '94, but while in rehearsal for the tour, Staley arrived intoxicated to a practice session. Kinney refused to perform with Staley in this condition, and a day before the start of the tour, the band decided to cancel all of their scheduled dates. The band's manager, Susan Silver, released an official statement announcing the group's live appearances for the foreseeable future had been canceled due to health issues. Alice in Chains were replaced by Candlebox on the tour. After this announcement, the musicians stopped communicating with the press. Rumors sprang up; some said Alice in Chains had broken up, and others claimed that Staley had died from AIDS. Though never made official, the band effectively disbanded for the next six months.

During their inactivity, the band members took part in side projects. Inez appeared on Slash's solo album It's Five O'Clock Somewhere. Kinney and Jerry Cantrell contributed songs to the Willie Nelson tribute album Twisted Willie; it was Cantrell's first experience of working on material outside Alice in Chains. Cantrell then decided to work on material for a solo album with the working title Jerry's Kids. Staley's direction, however, cast doubts over Alice in Chains' future when he joined what would become "grunge supergroup" Mad Season, which was founded by solo artist John Baker Saunders and Pearl Jam's Mike McCready. McCready, who met Saunders at a Hazelden Foundation rehab clinic, intended the project to unite musicians recovering from addictions. After recruiting Screaming Trees' Barrett Martin, the three invited Staley to be their vocalist, hoping it would help him stay sober. Mad Season recorded a studio album, Above; they performed at venues in Seattle and included some Alice in Chains songs in their sets. Contradicting prior reports about Staley's health, rumors he had left Alice in Chains spread. These reports irked Cantrell, who halted work on his solo album in favor of attempting to revive Alice in Chains.

== Production ==
=== Early recording and label issues ===
In 1994, Cantrell thought of recording a solo album and jammed with several drummers, including Josh Sinder of Tad and Norman Scott of Gruntruck. Cantrell and Scott recorded three demos at Cantrell's in-home studio. Cantrell later reunited with Inez at Bear Creek Studios in Woodinville, Washington, recruiting Ann and Nancy Wilson of Heart, and producer Toby Wright. Cantrell's moves were strategic; he planned for Kinney and Staley, who were still disillusioned with Alice in Chains, to find out about the sessions, and reconsider playing together again. According to Wright, Cantrell was prepared for Kinney and Staley to reject the offer down, at which point he would use the material for a solo album, despite his reluctance.

The recording sessions at Bear Creek were short and unproductive. The group spent $10,000 for a week in the studio but recorded only the croaking of frogs in a nearby pond. Kinney and Staley agreed to participate in a new Alice in Chains album. By January 1995, Kinney had rejoined Cantrell and Inez to work on new material; in May, Staley was invited to return. Staley told Rolling Stone the group reunited because they "felt like we were betraying each other" with their side projects. At the same time, Sony Music, the owner of Columbia Records, which also had Mad Season under contract, considered replacing Staley. Sony weighed the merits of Staley's condition and whether he would benefit more from working with Mad Season. When it became known McCready was returning to Pearl Jam, the possibility of replacing his role in Mad Season and maintaining Staley's involvement in the project was also considered, but Sony ultimately decided keeping Mad Season active was not worth the financial risk and released Staley from his contract.

Following the Bear Creek sessions, Wright was brought back as producer for what would become the new Alice in Chains album. The band's A&R manager, Nick Terzo, who had once offered Wright a job with Alice in Chains as a sound engineer, was not pleased with the musicians' decision. Terzo considered Wright more of a technician than a producer. He also believed a producer was obliged to find compromises between the band and the label, whereas Wright supported the band's creative independence; this led to Wright's selection for the production job. The band also barred Susan Silver from entering the studio. Wright was the only intermediary between the band and the management, and it was through him Silver learned of progress on the album. According to Wright, the musicians decided to distance themselves from management, but he did not oppose it because he wanted to isolate the band from their personal problems so they could focus on the music.

Despite the commercial success of the group's earlier works, Cantrell stated the main goal was making music to please the band's fans. According to Staley, the band wanted to create something they themselves would enjoy, rather than appealing to commercial trends. The band was given full creative control, initially without a deadline or budget. Before studio sessions began, Wright met Columbia president Don Ienner in New York. Ienner was skeptical about the project, and was sure Wright would not be successful or productive; Wright recalled "sitting in Donnie Ienner's office in New York before we started the record and him telling me, 'Good luck,' because he didn't think I'd be able to get a record out of them".

=== Creative process ===
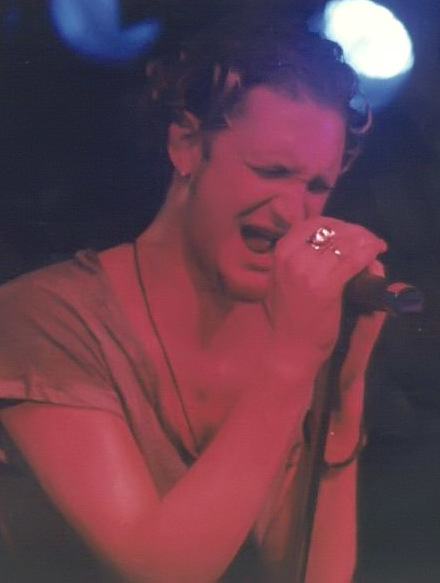
Vocalist Layne Staley's drug addiction intensified during the making of Alice in Chains.

Work on Alice in Chains began at Bad Animals Studio about a month after the March 1995 release of Mad Season's album Above. The band chose the studio because of its size and proximity to Staley's home. When work began, the musicians had no finished songs, though Cantrell had several ideas to work with from his home demo sessions. The band gave the demo tapes to Staley so he could write lyrics. Because no material was completed, the band decided to jam together until finding something that would work, as they had done on Jar of Flies, instead of spending time on pre-production. Most often, jams began with Cantrell and Kinney, who had the greatest musical chemistry developed between them. Instrumental parts were recorded during live sessions with the whole band; the song's structure of the song was first outlined, and then, after 15–20 performances, memorizing their parts, the musicians recorded the best takes. Wright largely relied on his intuition when deciding a take was good enough; some first takes were suitable, while others took many attempts, sometimes the recording was delayed until the next day. A song could undergo significant changes after Wright's initial approval; new sections could be added or old ones removed, which usually happened when fine-tuning vocal harmonies. Staley would write lyrics to finished recordings he liked and skipped the others.

Instead of a 12-hour standard workday, to maximize creative efforts, Wright established a work schedule that accommodated the band members whenever the group was comfortable. Because Staley's addiction often led to him being late or absent for recording and rehearsal sessions, Wright's assistant, Sam Hofstedt, was given a pager to notify him when Staley was available to work, regardless of time of day. On one occasion, Wright summoned Hofstedt to the studio at 1:00 a.m. after Staley had arrived. If Staley had tried to hide his drug use from those around him, it became less subtle during the recording of the album. Hofstedt said: "It seemed apparent to me he was using, because when you go to lock yourself in the bathroom for a while, it's not because you really like the bathroom". Staley was seen openly using drugs only once, though it served a purpose in recording a song, which became "God Am". The question of stopping work on the album was raised numerous times, but Wright persisted, sometimes organizing breaks of several days so all of the participants in the project could rest and get emotional release from the situation.

Bad Animals had up-to-date equipment, including a Solid State Logic G-Series mixing console. The recording process used 48 channels, so Wright had to carefully plan their distribution, reserving space for instruments before any other work on a song began. Sometimes, to save money, it was necessary to use the same track for several instruments, such as an acoustic guitar and a guitar solo; Inez called these "George Martin effects". Recordings were mixed with little participation from the band, who held faith in Wright and only approved the final result. Almost everything that happened in the studio, including conversations between the musicians, was recorded, which allowed them to experiment with and take note of combinations of guitars, amplifiers, and settings, and later choose the best result. Hofstedt estimated this approach used over 70 rolls of magnetic tape, and years later said the tape cost roughly the production budget of an entire modern album.

=== Instruments ===
Wright's first focus was the drums. Sean Kinney made a point of not using a metronome during the recordings, which made the songs more "living and breathing"; the tempo could fluctuate slightly but noticeably in parts of the songs, following changes in dynamics. Kinney wrote the drum parts except for "Again", which was written by Scott in the demo sessions with Cantrell. Cantrell asked Kinney to replicate Scott's part, forcing Kinney to change his approach.

Cantrell's used three tracks for his guitars: left and right for rhythm guitar and one in the centre for the lead part. In contrast, Dirt typically used six to eight guitar tracks, but he reduced this number to achieve a more natural sound. He initially played the lead part on his main G&L guitar using a Bogner Fish amplifier, then followed by playing it back on another guitar with a different amplifier, where additional effects and nuances could be added.

Although most of the instruments were re-recorded at Bad Animals, some parts were taken from demo versions. For example, Wright insisted on using the first take of the guitar solo for "Grind" that was recorded during Cantrell's home-studio sessions. Cantrell objected, considering it unfinished and unready. He tried to re-record it but eventually gave in to Wright's persuasion, and the solo was added to the final mix from Cantrell's ADAT tape recorder. The drum part for "Over Now", which long predates the creation of Alice in Chains, was also used unchanged from a demo version of the song recorded at London Bridge Studios.

=== Vocals ===
Recording Staley's vocals proved difficult; he experimented with intonation styles and polyphonic arrangements. He preferred to sing alone in the control room using a handheld microphone. Only after Staley had decided on his approach would he allow staff to enter the room to track his vocals. Staley's parts were usually recorded in one or two takes, most often using a Soundelux U95 microphone that was slightly modified by Wright. An exception was Staley's distorted voice on "Grind", which was recorded using a 1932 Turner Crystal microphone that Wright bought at a pawn shop for ten dollars.

The signature vocal harmonies that are a feature of Alice in Chains' previous work are more-frequently present throughout the album. As before, the vocalists performed their parts separately and were often absent during the tracking of each other's parts, only listening to the finished result. Wright compared Staley and Cantrell to John Lennon and Paul McCartney, and said although he often criticized Alice in Chains' live performances, he had nothing to complain about when it came to lyrics and melodies.

When it became apparent Staley's addictions were slowing the vocal recording, Ienner and Sony vice-president Michele Anthony decided to intervene. They called Staley one morning, congratulated him on the RIAA gold certification of Mad Season's Above, and demanded he finish the recording in the next nine days. Wright was issued his own ultimatum: if Staley was not present at the studio each of those days, Columbia would halt production of the album. Though Staley responded emotionally when Wright gave him the news, he complied and the album was finished in August 1995.

=== Completion of recording ===
While at Bad Animals between April and August 1995, Alice in Chains wrote over 25 songs. Twelve of these songs were selected for the final tracklist, which runs for 65 minutes. Alongside "Grind", "Again" originated from Cantrell's home demo sessions. Several instrumental compositions were rejected; they were sent to Columbia and Wright believes they may still be in the label's possession, unused in Cantrell's future solo projects. Wright was pleased with the final recordings, and the tracks were sent to be mixed at Electric Lady Studios in New York. The producer singled out "Shame In You", "Heaven Beside You", "Grind", and "God Am", the latter of which he recommended for release as a single. He believed the band had released a landmark album that would not disappoint listeners. Cantrell said of the experience: "It was often depressing, and getting it done felt like pulling hair out, but it was the fucking coolest thing, and I'm glad to have gone through it. I will cherish the memory forever". Staley added: "I'll cherish it forever, too, just because this one I can remember doing".

== Composition ==
=== Music ===
"Grind"
"Grind", the first track on the album, demonstrating an extreme of the heavier style some of the album uses

"Over Now"
"Over Now", the twelfth and final track on the album, demonstrating a more melodic composition sometimes used by the album

Alice in Chains combines the musical styles of both Dirt and Jar of Flies with lowered guitar tunings and acoustic approaches, combining melodic harmonies with dissonant guitar riffs. The dark and depressive nature of the music remained; Jerry Cantrell said in an interview with Rolling Stone around the release of the album: "our music's kind of about taking something ugly and making it beautiful". Despite the genre-blending, Cantrell said the album retains the band's heavy metal roots, while incorporating blues, rock and roll, and even punk rock. Critics have described the album as grunge, hard rock, sludge metal, and doom metal.

While heavy guitar sounds continued to be a hallmark of Alice in Chains' sound, Rolling Stone noted influences from Cream, Crosby, Stills and Nash, and the Allman Brothers Band on the record's calmer songs and ballads, saying the "hazier, more otherworldly aesthetic" may have been the result of "sleepless nights and controlled substances". In contrast, Los Angeles Times described most of the album as frequently shifting between "teeth-gnashing metal, bluesy acoustic songs and pop-friendly, chorus-heavy tunes". Much of the music was co-written by Cantrell and one or both of Inez and Kinney during rehearsals in the studio. There are three exceptions: Cantrell alone wrote "Grind" and "Again", which originate from his home sessions, and Staley wrote "Head Creeps".

The album's guitar sound is more natural than that on previous albums; Cantrell used fewer tracks and effects, and significantly shortened and simplified his solos, which were often improvised in the studio rather than written in advance. Guitarists who influenced his playing on the album include Brian May, Lindsey Buckingham, Jimi Hendrix, Tony Iommi, Jimmy Page, Robin Trower, Davey Johnstone, and David Gilmour. Most of the songs were recorded in drop D, except "Shame In You", "Nothin' Song", and "Over Now", which use an open tuning. This approach, which Cantrell had never used before, was conceived after a guitar he had lent a friend was returned to him tuned that way. (Note: These magazines give different accounts of the open tunings used; Cantrell demonstrated an open D tuning to Guitar, but mentioned in the Guitar Player interview the tuning was an open G tuning, and that all three of the songs in question were played in the same tuning.)

Staley's vocal style on Alice in Chains differs significantly from that on the band's previous albums, using effects liberally. For instance, he employed a pitch shifter and several layers of vocals on "Sludge Factory", and distortion on "Head Creeps" added a to his voice a distinctive buzzing sound that is reminiscent of a beehive. According to Ground Control: "syllables are spat regularly, some letters are almost hissed through ... he sounds almost feral and it's more eerie and surreal". Cantrell sang lead vocals on "Grind", "Heaven Beside You", and "Over Now", all of which he also wrote lyrics for. He originally did not wish to contribute lead vocals as much as he did, but Staley and the other band members insisted he sing on these tracks.

=== Lyrics ===
On the band's earlier material, Staley's usual lyrical themes explore drug addiction, despair, social alienation, isolation, and loneliness. At times, the lyrics on Alice in Chains fall into these themes, occasionally admitting guilt, such as in "Shame in You", though they often take on an angrier tone, blaming his friends, loved ones, and the media for his troubles. On "Grind", Cantrell wrote he wished "to hear the sound of a body breaking when I knock you down", while on "Head Creeps", Staley denounces rumors spread by the media as "lackeys' loose talk for fact".

Cantrell contributed the lyrics for the tracks on which he sang lead vocals. "Grind" is a response to rumors involving Staley's death and the band's breakup; Cantrell summarized it as a "'Fuck you for saying something about my life' song". "Heaven Beside You" was written after the end of Cantrell's seven-year relationship with his girlfriend. On the liner notes of Alice in Chains' box set Music Bank, Cantrell describes the song as an attempt to come to terms with the fact his personal life caused the two to split; he added: "All the things I write about her are a way for me to maybe speak to her, express things I could never express". "Over Now" deals with the complexities of the band's personal relationships. The chorus addresses the band members and asks: "Could you stand right here, look me straight in the eye and say that it's over now?" According to Cantrell, when he asked the band members, they could not ultimately break up.

Staley was suffering from writer's block and wrote his lyrics while in the studio. He said if he had been asked to sing the new songs, he would not have been able to do so because he did not remember his own lyrics. His lyrical themes sometimes illustrate despair and thoughts of death from his addiction; other songs touch on fame obsession and relationships.

In "Brush Away", Staley ponders whether the band and their work were being taken seriously, or if they were considered a joke or fad, while "God Am" asks a higher power why it was passively watching cruelty and heartlessness. "Sludge Factory" is about the ultimatum call Staley and Wright received from Ienner and Anthony, who told Staley and Wright they had nine days to finish the record because they were taking too long, a claim Staley directly references. "Nothin' Song", which was written in late in the recording phase, comprises the first thoughts that came to Staley's mind. These include the line "Sam, throw away your cake", addressing Hofstedt, whose birthday occurred during the recording sessions; he was given a cake in the shape of a naked woman that lay partially eaten for at least a month. "Again" and "Frogs" both recount betrayal by a friend.

Reflecting on the album in a 2018 interview with Noisey, Cantrell said:

There's a sadness to that record—it's the sound of a band falling apart. It was our last studio record [to that point]. It's a beautiful record, but it's sad, too. It's a little more exploratory, a little bit more meandering. It's not as crafted as the rest of our records were.

== Packaging ==
Work on the artwork for Alice in Chains began immediately after the recording of the album was completed. The concept was conceived by Kinney; the front cover features a three-legged dog, similar to one that chased him when he was working as a paperboy. The back features a photograph of three-legged sideshow performer Frank Lentini playing a lute, an image that was taken from an exhibition of Ripley's Believe It or Not!. To the band members, the number three was symbolic of multiple things; it was their first full-length studio album in three years after Dirt and represented rumors of Staley's death, after which would remain only three band members. According to Bill Adams, writing for Ground Control: "The signs that something is just not right appear everywhere both on and in Alice in Chains"; Adams said the album's booklet includes "images of ghastly, contorted fairies with no flesh on their arms, sinister, personified bottles swimming through black oceans, cartoons of mutant animals standing on trial, [and] synthetic limbs", among other unsettling images.

The band's photographer, Rocky Schenck, cast three-legged dogs for the cover art. Staley and Cantrell were unsatisfied with the result and instead chose a fax with the image of a three-legged dog. Staley and Cantrell thought the faxed image looked grittier and thus more appropriate than Schenck's photograph, which was used on the 1999 box set Music Bank. Another three-legged dog named Sunshine appears in the music video for "Grind"; contrary to rumor, none of the dogs used for the photoshoot, music video, or album cover belonged to Cantrell.

Kinney suggested calling the album Tripod, referencing the dog that chased him as a child. The other band members did not like the name, and decided to self-title the album instead. It gained the nickname Tripod anyway, as well as Dog Album or Dog Record.

The band's Japanese distributor was offended by the cover art and viewed it as mockery of injured animals. For its Japanese release Alice in Chains was issued with a blank, white cover with the dark blue text "Alice In Chains" inside a dark blue border at the bottom-right corner. Two remixes of "Again", created by Praga Khan and Olivier Adams of Lords of Acid, were originally created for release as B-sides for the album's European singles. These two remixes appear as bonus tracks on the Japanese version of the album, subtitled "Tattoo of Pain Mix" and "Jungle Mix", respectively.

== Release ==
"Grind" was released as the first single from the album on October 6, 1995. It was chosen for its heaviness, perceived musical appeal, and its lyrics that urge listeners to avoid writing off the band despite press reports relating to their turmoil. A bootlegged, unfinished version of the song had already been leaked, and the song was released earlier than planned to combat the spread of the bootleg. The song peaked at number seven on the Billboard Album Rock Tracks chart (later called Mainstream Rock Tracks) and at number eighteen on the Billboard Modern Rock Tracks chart.

On October 31, Alice in Chains was formally released on vinyl LP; CD and cassette copies were available on November 6 in the United Kingdom, and the following day elsewhere. (Note: One source gives November 3 as the release date for the album, nonspecific to region.) The album debuted at number one on the Billboard 200, moving 189,000 copies in its first week, and staying on the chart for 46 weeks. It has since been certified double platinum by the Recording Industry Association of America (RIAA), signifying shipments of two million copies. In January 1996, Cantrell said the band would tour in support of the album, but the members later opted not to tour, adding to the rumors of Staley's drug abuse. When asked about the frustration of not touring to support the record, Cantrell discussed how Staley's addictions led to tensions within the band: "We rode the good times together and we stuck together through the hard times. We never stabbed each other in the back and spilled our guts and do that kind of bullshit that you see happen a lot."

"Heaven Beside You" was released as the album's second single on January 29, 1996. "Heaven Beside You" peaked at number 52 on the Billboard Hot 100 Airplay chart, at that time becoming Alice in Chains' second-highest-charting domestic single after "No Excuses". "Heaven Beside You" also peaked at number three on the Billboard Mainstream Rock Tracks chart and at number six on the Modern Rock Tracks chart. "Heaven Beside You" was followed by "Again", which by mid-February had already been added to rock radio; it peaked at number eight on the Mainstream Rock Tracks chart and at number thirty-six on the Modern Rock Tracks chart.

== Promotion ==
=== The Nona Tapes ===
To help promote Alice in Chains, Columbia asked the band to create an electronic press kit. Normally, the band would talk about themselves and their work, but the group created a mockumentary in the style of This Is Spinal Tap (1984), titled The Nona Tapes. Schenck directed the project, which fictionalizes how the band members spent their free time when they were not working. Cantrell portrays two characters: as himself, he is shown shoveling manure at a horse stable, but for most of the project, he is disguised as a female journalist named Nona Weissbaum. Weissbaum takes a car ride around Seattle, interviewing the other three members of Alice in Chains. Kinney performs as Bozo the Clown and is later seen in-costume drinking at a bar. Inez is portrayed as a member of the band being held against his will, and the band are holding his family to ransom. When Inez reads in a magazine that his band has disbanded, he starts running a hot dog stand in downtown Seattle. Staley is shown digging through a dumpster; his interview responses are overdubbed with responses different to those that were recorded. The editing was Staley's idea.

Schenck considered the work one of the best experiences of those he had with the band. Creating The Nona Tapes convinced Schenck the musicians could have been good actors had they wished to be, and mentioned it to several directors. The band had previously appeared in film scenes, including a cameo on Cameron Crowe's 1992 production Singles; Cantrell later made a cameo appearance on Crowe's Jerry Maguire in 1996, but aside from that, the band members were never seriously interested.

Columbia did not like The Nona Tapes at first and considered it a waste of money, but after the project became a cult hit, the company, despite the band's objection, decided to sell it and the video was released on VHS in December 1995.

=== Press relations and Rolling Stone controversy ===
After pulling out of the Shit Hits the Sheds tour in 1994, the musicians refused to give any interviews, even during the recording of the album. Despite the resulting rumors surrounding the band, Cantrell later said the new album would answer all of the questions that had been asked. As the album proved to be successful on American charts, however, the band became more optimistic and cautiously began to respond to the press. Usually, Cantrell would respond to journalists' questions. Despite fervent press interest and persistent rumors, the musicians kept their patience in addressing their absence and the gossip that followed. They wanted to sound sincere and honest while remaining modest and avoiding the pathos of rock stars.

Among other publications, Rolling Stone took an interest in the return of Alice in Chains. Jon Wiederhorn was commissioned to write a feature article about the band. In late 1995, Wiederhorn flew to Seattle and spent several days with the musicians. Wiederhorn talked to the entire band and to each member individually. In a conversation with Staley, he drew attention to the injection marks on his left arm; Staley said he had never solved his drug problem. Work on the article continued during the Christmas holidays. In parallel, a representative of the magazine photographed the musicians.

The article appeared in the February 1996 issue of Rolling Stone and, except for mentioning the marks on Staley's arms, did not contain any controversial facts. The issue's cover image, however, brought the band negative attention; it was a photograph of Staley and the cover story was titled "The Needle & The Damage Done". The title was a reference to the eponymous song by Neil Young about heroin addiction. Staley was offended the magazine did not keep its promise to publish an article about the whole band rather than focusing on him and his personal issues. He was portrayed as the only drug addict in the group, although his bandmates had also dealt with substance problems. According to Wiederhorn, the choice of image for the cover and the tabloid-style headline was made in another department without his participation. He also said the article was heavily edited, and that most of his coverage of Inez and Kinney was reduced to sparse mentions. He said he had brought up Staley's drug use, stating to ignore it would not be an honest depiction of the band: "I had an obligation to write about what the band was motivated by, what the band was dealing with, what some of the demons were".

=== Television performances ===
Alice in Chains did not tour to support their eponymous album, but they were offered several individual appearances, including MTV Unplugged, which they declined several times before accepting. The program featured bands performing concerts open to the public with entirely acoustic setlists that were taped by MTV. The show took place on April 10, 1996, at Brooklyn Academy of Music's Majestic Theater, with Ienner, Anthony, and the members of Metallica in attendance. The performance aired on MTV on May 28, and Wright was engaged to edit the live album resulting from the concert.

Unplugged was released on July 17, 1996, and debuted at number three on the Billboard 200. It was the band's only headlining concert promoting Alice in Chains, their first live performance since they co-headlined the Lollapalooza tour in mid-1993, and their last headlining show with Staley.

Following the Unplugged performance and its television debut, Alice in Chains appeared on other television programs. On April 20, on Saturday Night Special, the band performed an electric version of "Again" for the first time, and was introduced by actor Max Perlich, who had appeared in the music video for "No Excuses". On May 10, the band performed a medley of "Again" and "We Die Young" on The Late Show with David Letterman.

=== Opening for Kiss and aftermath ===
In what would be their final live performances during their original run, Alice in Chains were an opening act on a classic lineup reunion tour for Kiss, titled the Alive/Worldwide Tour. Alice in Chains replaced Stone Temple Pilots, whose vocalist, Scott Weiland, was undergoing rehabilitation for his own drug issues, and that slot was awarded to Alice in Chains. Cantrell and Kinney were excited at the opportunity, but Staley refused the invitation several times before being persuaded to accept the offer. The tour began on June 28, 1996, at Tiger Stadium in Detroit. Both Alex Coletti, who had produced Alice in Chains' Unplugged performance, and Billy Corgan, frontman of The Smashing Pumpkins, were in attendance at the Detroit show and praised the band's performance. Kerrang!, however, reported that Staley appeared physically unhealthy on the first show of the run.

Alice in Chains played four shows for the tour, making stops in Louisville and St. Louis, before a final show in Kansas City on July 3. Silver, sitting backstage, had speculated with the band's tour manager it would be the band's final live performance. During the performance, Kinney stood up from his drum set and began to sing Kiss's "Beth", which in its original form had also been sung by the Kiss drummer, Peter Criss. The crowd was divided; Kinney received both cheers and boos in equal measure. Kinney said he was not wearing the proper makeup and jokingly told off the audience before the band performed their next song. The Kansas City show was to be Staley's final live performance; after the show, he overdosed and was rushed to a Kansas City hospital. Although the band's appearance on the tour was brief, they had been part of the most commercially successful tour of 1996, which grossed $43.6 million by the end of the year.

Alice in Chains' only further activity with Staley was the recording of two new songs, "Get Born Again" and "Died", in 1998. After that, Staley rarely left his condominium in Seattle. It was there where he died on April 5, 2002, from a drug overdose. The band would not emerge until 2005, at first to play a benefit show. When Alice in Chains decided a few months later they wished to tour again, they brought in Comes With the Fall vocalist William DuVall as Staley's successor in 2006. DuVall had been in the audience at the Louisville show during the tour with Kiss, and in 2009, nearly 14 years after the release of Alice in Chains, the band released the follow-up album, Black Gives Way to Blue.

== Reception ==
Professional ratings
Review scores
Source	Rating
AllMusic	3/5 stars
The Charlotte Observer	4/4 stars
Entertainment Weekly	C
Kerrang!	3/5 stars
Los Angeles Times	2.5/4 stars
Rolling Stone	4/5 stars
Spin	4/10

Some music critics recognized Alice in Chains for being a musical progression for the band, and critics noted a break away from the grunge label that had been assigned to them. Jon Pareles said in his review for The New York Times, in contrast with their previous albums, Alice in Chains distances itself from the raw distortions associated with grunge, instead sounding "cleanly delineated and meticulously layered". Jon Wiederhorn of Rolling Stone highlighted a strong influence from Jar of Flies, and praised the lyrical honesty of the album. Noting the songs "achieve a startling, staggering and palpable impact", he concluded the album was a "musical rebirth" for the band.

According to Billboard's Paul Verna, Alice in Chains returns to the band's already well-known grunge sound and would thus be a hit with the band's core fans. He acknowledged the acoustic arrangements on the album, likening them to Jar of Flies and the work of R.E.M. People praised Staley's and Cantrell's performances, and wrote the "eerily compelling" music would fit well in a horror film, especially one by Wes Craven or Clive Barker. Greg Kot of the Chicago Tribune wrote: "acoustic guitars, buried spoken vocals, a mix that ranges from stripped-down clarity to white noise chaos, and the band's sneaky way with a melody mark Alice in Chains as its most accomplished record", noting the callbacks to Jar of Flies enhance the finished product. Toronto Sun's Peter Howell also praised the mix of styles, hailing the effort as "a most welcome recovery" from the band's personal turmoil. J. D. Considine, writing for The Baltimore Sun, said the album has "some of the crunchiest guitar and heaviest riffs Alice in Chains has ever used but that it does so without really sounding like a metal album", and praised Staley's distinctive performances on "God Am", "Sludge Factory", and "Again". John C. Wooten, in The Charlotte Observer, praised the album, stating both the aggressive and calm tracks on the album surpass those of Dirt.

Some reviewers expressed disappointment the material on Alice in Chains was not used to its full potential, considering the time and money invested in the project. AllMusic's Steve Huey wrote that Alice in Chains is the band's best-produced record, placing "Grind", "Brush Away", "Heaven Beside You", and "Over Now" among the band's strongest tracks. He said: "[the album] should have turned out better than it did", noting some parts are "undercrafted" and "forgettable". Kerrang! reviewer Jason Arnopp wrote similarly; he praised the first half of the album, particularly "Brush Away", "Heaven Beside You" and "Head Creeps", but ultimately said the "brave, non-conformist album" was not what fans were hoping to hear. Metal Hammer's Andy Stout wrote that the album is not a bad one, but that it is "certainly guilty of being an indifferent one". He complimented the "star-spangled guitar and 60s hippie chic" of "Grind" and the noticeable Black Sabbath inspiration evident on "Sludge Factory", and acknowledged merit in "Head Creeps", "Shame In You", and "Again", but wrote that the rest of the album "is inconsequential and bland; messy, disjointed, and shot-through with self-loathing". The Boston Globe's Paul Robicheau was appreciative of Cantrell's songwriting and performance, but was less impressed by some of Staley's contributions.

Other music critics found the record sounds dated or uninteresting. Entertainment Weekly's Nisid Hajari called Alice in Chains "a sludgy stew of cookie-cutter riffs and self-indulgent, introspective noodling rock", but highlighted "Head Creeps" as a standout track. Writing for Los Angeles Times, Cheo H. Coker described the album as formulaic but praised "Heaven Beside You" as a high point and lamented that the band did not take more risks during production. In Spin, Gina Arnold noted how grunge had become tiresome in mainstream media in the wake of punk rock bands such as The Offspring, and that Alice in Chains fails to stand out from the group's previous work. John Griffin, in his review for Montreal Gazette, criticized the album's "rerun nightmare grunge chords" and "tired gothy vision". Writing for Select, Roy Wilkinson deemed the album a poor imitation of Black Sabbath and said the lyrics are "the kind of banally pompous ire that makes a tabloid-hounded Michael Hutchence seem witheringly articulate".

=== Award nominations ===
Year	Ceremony	Award	Result	Ref.
1996	Grammy Awards	Best Hard Rock Performance ("Grind")	Nominated	
1996	MTV Video Music Awards	Best Hard Rock Video ("Again")	Nominated	
1997	Grammy Awards	Best Hard Rock Performance ("Again")	Nominated	

== Track listing ==
All lyrics are written by Layne Staley, except where noted.

Alice in Chains track listing
No.	Title	Lyrics	Music	Length
1.	"Grind"	Jerry Cantrell	Cantrell	4:44
2.	"Brush Away"		Cantrell; Mike Inez; Sean Kinney	3:22
3.	"Sludge Factory"		Cantrell; Kinney	7:12
4.	"Heaven Beside You"	Cantrell	Cantrell; Inez	5:27
5.	"Head Creeps"		Staley	6:28
6.	"Again"		Cantrell	4:05
7.	"Shame in You"		Cantrell; Inez; Kinney	5:35
8.	"God Am"		Cantrell; Inez; Kinney	4:08
9.	"So Close"		Cantrell; Kinney	2:45
10.	"Nothin' Song"		Cantrell; Kinney	5:40
11.	"Frogs"		Cantrell; Inez; Kinney	8:18
12.	"Over Now"	Cantrell	Cantrell; Kinney	7:03
Total length:				64:47

Notes

- "Over Now" samples the intro of "Good Night" by Ted Lewis and his band.

== Personnel ==
All credits are adapted from the album's liner notes, unless noted.

Alice in Chains

- Layne Staley – lead and backing vocals, rhythm guitar on "Head Creeps"
- Jerry Cantrell – lead guitar, backing vocals; lead vocals on "Grind", "Heaven Beside You", and "Over Now"
- Mike Inez – bass
- Sean Kinney – drums; artwork guide

Production

- Toby Wright – production, recording, mixing
- Alice in Chains – production
- Tom Nellen – recording
- Sam Hofstedt – recording assistant
- John Seymour – mix assistant
- Stephen Marcussen – mastering
- Kevan Wilkins – studio coordinator
- Darrell Peters – audio technician
- Walter Gemienhardt – audio technician
- Mary Maurer – art direction
- Doug Erb – design
- Rocky Schenck – photography
- Rob Bloch – photography

== Charts ==
Weekly chart performance for Alice in Chains
Chart (1995–1996)	Peak position
Australian Albums (ARIA)	5
Canada Top Albums/CDs (RPM)	5
Dutch Albums (Album Top 100)	75
Finnish Albums (Suomen virallinen lista)	13
German Albums (Offizielle Top 100)	93
New Zealand Albums (RMNZ)	28
Norwegian Albums (VG-lista)	11
Scottish Albums (Official Charts)	37
Swedish Albums (Sverigetopplistan)	11
UK Albums (Official Charts)	37
UK Rock & Metal Albums (Official Charts)	4
US Billboard 200	1

Weekly chart performance for Alice in Chains
Chart (2026)	Peak position
Austrian Albums (Ö3 Austria)	30
Belgian Albums (Ultratop Wallonia)	60
German Albums (Offizielle Top 100)	53
German Rock & Metal Albums (Offizielle Top 100)	14
Greek Albums (IFPI)	16
Hungarian Physical Albums (MAHASZ)	4
Irish Albums (IRMA)	56
Scottish Albums (Official Charts)	14
Swiss Albums (Schweizer Hitparade)	72

== Certifications ==
Certifications for Alice in Chains
Region	Certification	Certified units/sales
Australia (ARIA)	Gold	35,000^{^}
Canada (Music Canada)	Platinum	100,000^{^}
United Kingdom (BPI)	Silver	60,000^{‡}
United States (RIAA)	2× Platinum	2,000,000^{^}
^{^} Shipments figures based on certification alone.^{‡} Sales+streaming figures based on certification alone.
