= Over Now =

Over Now may refer to:

- "Over Now" (Alice in Chains song), 1996
- "Over Now" (Calvin Harris and the Weeknd song), 2020
- "Over Now", a 2018 song by Post Malone from Beerbongs & Bentleys
