= The Nona Tapes =

1995 mockumentary by Alice in Chains

Video by Alice in Chains
- Released: December 12, 1995 (VHS); September 5, 2006 (DVD)
- Recorded: September 24, 1995
- Genre: Mockumentary
- Length: 25:03
- Label: Columbia Music Video; Sony Music Video
- Director: Rocky Schenck
- Producer: Katherine Shaw; David Naylor; Samson Aslanian

Alice in Chains chronology
Live Facelift (1991)	The Nona Tapes (1995)	Unplugged (1996)

The Nona Tapes is a 1995 mockumentary by the American rock/Alternative metal band Alice in Chains directed by Rocky Schenck to promote the band's self-titled album. Released on VHS on December 12, 1995, it features journalist Nona Weisbaum (played by Jerry Cantrell) interviewing the band in Seattle and also includes the music video for the album's lead single, "Grind", and outtake footage overdubbed with the second single, "Heaven Beside You". The Nona Tapes peaked at No. 23 on Billboard's Top Video Sales and at No. 25 on the Top Music Videos chart.

Although the original VHS is out of print, it can still be found on second-hand marketplaces for modest prices (as of July 2025). Additionally, in 2006, Best Buy offered a DVD version for free for a limited time with purchases of the compilation The Essential Alice in Chains. On June 19, 2017, Alice in Chains' official Vevo channel uploaded the video on YouTube.

== Synopsis ==
Aspiring journalist Nona Weisbaum (played by a cross-dressing Jerry Cantrell) is on a quest to "find some Seattle rock stars" for a breakthrough story. Throughout the video, Weisbaum scours the streets of Seattle and eventually finds and interviews all members of Alice in Chains, including having to kidnap Sean Kinney. A separate interviewer finds Cantrell, who's spending his last day as a rancher before returning to the band. Kinney also appears as a clown who's on the last day of his job, spending the night getting drunk, while his fictional self is evicted from his apartment.

Nonsensical interviewing is shown throughout, including questions of misogyny and abuse between members, along with sarcastic answers over the contents of their eponymous album. Entwined however are more genuine interviews revealing the lives of the band members footage regarding the album. Excerpts for "Grind", "Brush Away", "Heaven Beside You", "Head Creeps" and "Over Now" are heard. The music video for "Grind" is featured near the end, and the mockumentary concludes with outtake footage for "Heaven Beside You".

== Cast ==
- Jerry Cantrell as himself / Nona Weisbaum
- Layne Staley as himself
- Sean Kinney as himself
- Mike Inez as himself
- Rocky Schenck as himself
- Katherine Shaw as Interviewer

== Production ==
To promote their self-titled album, Columbia Records asked Alice in Chains to do an Electronic Press Kit (EPK), a common marketing tool in the '90s in which they should talk about themselves, but they did not want to do that. The band took the money from the label and made The Nona Tapes instead. Columbia did not like the finished product at first and told the band they had wasted their money doing it. However, it became a cult hit and Columbia decided to sell it, ironically against the band's opposition. The video was eventually released on VHS in December 1995. In 2006, The Nona Tapes was released on DVD and came as a bonus with the compilation The Essential Alice in Chains.

Nona Weisbaum made a special appearance for Alice in Chains' tribute at MoPOP's Founders Award on December 1, 2020.

== Chart positions ==
Chart (1995–1996)	Peak position
Australia Music Videos (ARIA)	14
UK Music Videos (OCC)	10
US Top Music Videos	25
US Top Video Sales	23

== See also ==
- Alice in Chains: AIC 23, mockumentary to promote the band's The Devil Put Dinosaurs Here
