= Behind the Player: Mike Inez =

Behind The Player: Mike Inez

Video by Mike Inez
- Released: November 1, 2008
- Length: 72:00
- Label: IMV
- Director: Leon Melas
- Producers: Ken Mayer & Sean E DeMott

Behind The Player: Mike Inez is an Interactive Music Video featuring Alice in Chains bassist Mike Inez. Released on November 1, 2008 by IMV, the DVD features Mike giving in-depth bass lessons for how to play "Again" and "A Little Bitter" by Alice in Chains and an intimate behind-the scenes look at his life as a professional musician, including rare photos and video. The DVD also includes Mike jamming the two tracks with The Cult's drummer John Tempesta, VideoTab that shows exactly how Mike plays his parts in the two songs, as well as other bonus material.

IMV donates $.25 from the sale of each Behind the Player DVD to Little Kids Rock, an organization that gets instruments in the hands of underprivileged kids.

== Contents ==
Behind The Player

Mike talks about his background, influences and gear, including rare photos and video

"Again" by Alice in Chains

- Lesson: Mike gives an in-depth bass lesson for how to play the song
- Jam: Mike jams the track with The Cult's drummer John Tempesta
- VideoTab: Animated tablature shows exactly how Mike plays the track

"A Little Bitter" by Alice in Chains

- Lesson: Mike gives an in-depth bass lesson for how to play the song
- Jam: Mike jams the track with The Cult's drummer John Tempesta
- VideoTab: Animated tablature shows exactly how Mike plays the track

Special features

- Bonus Live Clip
- Little Kids Rock promotional video

== Personnel ==
- Produced By: Ken Mayer & Sean E Demott
- Directed By: Leon Melas
- Executive Producer: Rick Donaleshen
- Associate Producer: John 5
- Director Of Photography: Ken Barrows
- Sound Engineer: Matt Chidgey
- Edited By: Jeff Morose
- Mixed By: Matt Chidgey & Cedrick Courtois
- Graphics By: Thayer Demay
- Transcription By: Thayer Demay
- Camera Operators: Brian Silva, Mike Chateneuf, Doug Cragoe
- Technical Directors: Tyler Bourns & Chris Golde
- Gaffer: John Parker

- Assistant Director: Matt Pick
- Lighting And Grip: Mcnulty Nielson
- Key Grip: Jaletta Kalman
- Artist Hospitality: Sasha Mayer
- Shot At: Third Encore
- Special Guest: John Tempesta
- Cover Photo By: Stephanie Pick
- Video Courtesy Of: Todd Shuss, Carol Peters Management, Peter “Videopete” Sicard
- Photos Courtesy Of: Marty Temme, Mike Brown, Tracy Ketcher, Stephanie Pick
- Photo Library Complements Of: Ultimaterockpix.Com
