= Nutshell (song) =

- B-Side to Grind

Song by Alice in Chains

from the EP Jar of Flies
- A-side: "Grind"
- Released: January 25, 1994
- Recorded: September 1993
- Studio: London Bridge (Seattle)
- Genre: Acoustic rock; alternative rock; grunge
- Length: 4:19
- Label: Columbia
- Composers: Mike Inez; Jerry Cantrell; Sean Kinney
- Lyricist: Layne Staley
- Producers: Alice in Chains; Toby Wright

"Nutshell" is a song by American rock band Alice in Chains that originally appeared on the band's 1994 EP Jar of Flies. The band played it on MTV Unplugged in 1996, and this rendition of the song was included on both the box set Music Bank (1999) and the compilation album The Essential Alice in Chains (2006). Since 2011, guitarist/vocalist Jerry Cantrell dedicates "Nutshell" to Alice in Chains' late original members Layne Staley and Mike Starr during the band's concerts.

== Lyrics and music ==
=== Lyrics ===
The lyrics were written by vocalist Layne Staley, and the music was written by bassist Mike Inez, guitarist/vocalist Jerry Cantrell, and drummer Sean Kinney.

Bassist Mike Inez said of "Nutshell", when asked what song makes him think of Layne Staley the most:

I think the No. 1 for me is "Nutshell." Layne was very honest with his songwriting. And in "Nutshell," he really put everything in a nutshell for everybody. That song still gets me choked up whenever I play it. I get a little teary-eyed, and sometimes when we're doing the arena runs especially, they'll have some video footage of Layne. And I look and see me and Jerry [Cantrell, vocals and guitar] and Sean [Kinney, drums] looking the wrong way. We're not looking at the audience, we're looking back at Layne, and it's pretty cool that there's still that song for us. Yeah, it's just a sad thing.

=== Music ===
Jon Pareles of The New York Times commented that the arrangements on "Nutshell" recalled those of Canadian musician Neil Young.

== Legacy and reception ==
Although never released as a single, "Nutshell" is widely regarded as one of Alice in Chains' best songs. In 2013, it was ranked No. 9 on Rolling Stone's readers' poll "The 10 Saddest Songs of All Time". In 2014, Loudwire ranked the song number five on their list of the 10 greatest Alice in Chains songs, and in 2021, Kerrang ranked the song number four on their list of the 20 greatest Alice in Chains songs.

== Live performances ==
Alice in Chains performed the song for the first time at the Memorial Hall in Kansas City on September 22, 1993. The band performed an acoustic version of "Nutshell" for its appearance on MTV Unplugged on April 10, 1996. It was the opening song of the concert and was included on the Unplugged live album and home video release. The Unplugged concert marked the last time the band performed the song with Layne Staley.

Since 2011, Jerry Cantrell dedicates "Nutshell" to Layne Staley and Mike Starr during Alice In Chains' concerts with new vocalist William DuVall. During their concert at the Hellfest Open Air Festival in Clisson, France on June 24, 2018, Cantrell dedicated the song to his longtime friend and Pantera drummer Vinnie Paul, who died two days before the concert.

== Personnel ==
- Layne Staley – vocals
- Jerry Cantrell – electric and acoustic guitars
- Mike Inez – bass
- Sean Kinney – brushed drums, percussion

== Charts ==
Chart performance for "Nutshell"
| Chart (2025) | Peak position |
|---|---|
| US Hard Rock Streaming Songs (Billboard) | 14 |

== Certifications ==
| Region | Certification | Certified units/sales |
|---|---|---|
| New Zealand (RMNZ) | 3× Platinum | 90,000^{‡} |
| United States (RIAA) | Platinum | 1,000,000^{‡} |
^{‡} Sales+streaming figures based on certification alone.
