= Grind (song) =

1995 single by Alice in Chains

Single by Alice in Chains

from the album Alice in Chains
- Released: October 6, 1995
- Recorded: 1995
- Studio: Bad Animals (Seattle, Washington)
- Genre: Sludge metal; grunge; alternative rock
- Length: 4:45
- Label: Columbia
- Songwriter: Jerry Cantrell
- Producers: Toby Wright; Alice in Chains

Alice in Chains singles chronology
"Got Me Wrong" (1994)	"Grind" (1995)	"Heaven Beside You" (1996)

"Grind" is a song by American rock band Alice in Chains. It is the opening track and the lead single from their third studio album, Alice in Chains (1995). The song was written by Jerry Cantrell, who also sings lead vocals with Layne Staley harmonizing with him. "Grind" spent 16 weeks on the Billboard Album Rock Tracks chart, peaking at number seven. The song was included on the compilation albums Nothing Safe: Best of the Box (1999), Music Bank (1999), Greatest Hits (2001), and The Essential Alice in Chains (2006). It was nominated for the Grammy Award for Best Hard Rock Performance in 1996.

== Lyrics ==
Written by guitarist and vocalist Jerry Cantrell, "Grind" addresses the various rumors that surrounded the band at the time. The opening lines, "In the darkest hole, you'd be well advised/Not to plan my funeral before the body dies", address the rumors that the band had broken up and the many rumors of vocalist Layne Staley's death that had occurred frequently around this time. In the liner notes of 1999's Music Bank box set collection, Jerry Cantrell said of the song:

That was pretty much at the height of publicity about canceled tours, heroin, amputations, everything, thus it was another "FUCK YOU for saying something about my life" song. Any single rumor you can imagine, I've heard. I've been dead a few times, Layne's been dead countless times and lost limbs. I get on the phone every time I hear a new one, "Hey Layne, radio in New York says you lost two more fingers." "Oh really? Cool." I'd spoof The Six Million Dollar Man; "Since technology's moved on it only cost us 2 million to put Layne back together and we got better parts."

== Release and reception ==
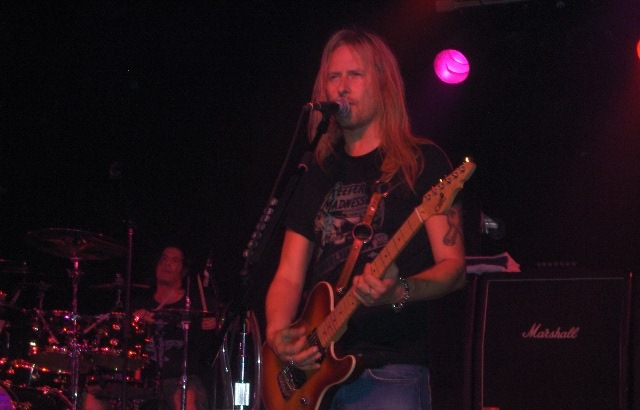
"Grind" was written by guitarist/vocalist Jerry Cantrell.

"Grind" was originally scheduled to be released to US rock radio on October 23, 1995, before an early cut of the song was leaked to radio prematurely in October 1995. As a result, the band released it via satellite uplink a few days later, on October 6, 1995, to combat illegal versions being played in rotation. On October 30, 1995, the song was released physically in the United Kingdom. The song peaked at number seven on the Billboard Album Rock Tracks chart, number 18 on the Billboard Modern Rock Tracks chart, and number 23 on the UK Singles Chart.

"Grind" was nominated for the Grammy Award for Best Hard Rock Performance in 1996, losing to Pearl Jam's "Spin the Black Circle". Editorial reviews frequently singled out the dark, compelling lyrics of the song. Jon Wiederhorn of Rolling Stone noted, "'Grind' shimmers and shudders beneath a web of trippy wah-wah guitar and half-distorted vocal harmonies, and features one of the album's many hook-filled choruses."

AllMusic's Steve Huey regarded the song "among the band's best work" but also noted that the less refined tracks on the album make the defiance of "Grind" sound "more like denial." Regarding band rumors, Jon Pareles of The New York Times commented that the song advises against believing "what you may have heard and what you think you know." "Grind" was ranked at number 60 on Spin's "The 95 Best Alternative Rock Songs of 1995" list.

== Music video ==
The music video for "Grind" was released in November 1995. It was directed by Rocky Schenck, who had previously directed the "We Die Young", "Them Bones", and "What the Hell Have I" music videos for the band. The video was shot at Hollywood National Studios from October 8 to 21, 1995. It is a live-action video with animated sequences featuring the band underground of an old building where a three-legged dog is. The dog in the video is not the same dog on the cover of Alice in Chains' self-titled album, and contrary to false information spread on the internet, it did not belong to Jerry Cantrell either. It was a different dog named Sunshine that was hired just for the video, according to Cantrell. The old man in the video was played by actor Richard Stretchberry.

The video received heavy rotation on MTV in late 1995 and early 1996, and it is available on the home video releases The Nona Tapes (1995) and Music Bank: The Videos (1999).

== Track listing ==
No.	Title	Lyrics	Music	Length
1.	"Grind"	Jerry Cantrell	Cantrell	4:45
2.	"So Close"	Layne Staley	Cantrell; Sean Kinney	2:45
3.	"Nutshell"	Staley	Cantrell; Mike Inez; Kinney	4:19
4.	"Love, Hate, Love"	Staley	Cantrell	6:26

- Tracks one and two were originally included on Alice in Chains
- Track three was originally included on Jar of Flies
- Track four was originally included on Facelift

== Personnel ==
- Jerry Cantrell – lead and backing vocals, guitars
- Layne Staley – backing vocals
- Mike Inez – bass
- Sean Kinney – drums, percussion

== Charts ==
Chart (1995–1996)	Peak position
Australia (ARIA)	77
Canada Top Singles (RPM)	53
Canada Rock/Alternative (RPM)	3
European Hot 100 Singles (Music & Media)	70
UK Singles (Official Charts)	23
UK Rock & Metal (Official Charts)	1
US Alternative Airplay (Billboard)	18
US Mainstream Rock Airplay (Billboard)	7

== Release history ==
Region	Date	Format(s)	Label(s)	Ref.
United States	October 6, 1995	Radio	Columbia	
United Kingdom	October 30, 1995	7-inch vinyl; CD; cassette	Columbia	
Australia	November 6, 1995	CD; cassette	Columbia	
