= Heaven Beside You =

1996 single by Alice in Chains

Single by Alice in Chains

from the album Alice in Chains
- Released: January 29, 1996
- Recorded: April–August 1995
- Studio: Bad Animals, Seattle, Washington
- Genre: Alternative rock; Southern rock; grunge
- Length: 5:27
- Label: Columbia
- Composers: Jerry Cantrell; Mike Inez
- Lyricist: Jerry Cantrell
- Producers: Toby Wright; Alice in Chains

Alice in Chains singles chronology
"Grind" (1995)	"Heaven Beside You" (1996)	"Again" (1996)

"Heaven Beside You" is a song by American rock band Alice in Chains and the second single from their third studio album, Alice in Chains (1995). The music was composed by guitarist and vocalist Jerry Cantrell and bassist Mike Inez, and the lyrics were written by Cantrell about his relationship with his then-girlfriend, Courtney Clarke. Cantrell sings lead vocals, with Layne Staley doing harmonies during the chorus. The song spent 26 weeks on Billboard's Mainstream Rock Tracks chart and peaked at No. 3. An acoustic version performed on Alice in Chains' MTV Unplugged in 1996 was released in a live album and DVD. "Heaven Beside You" was included on the compilation albums Music Bank (1999), Greatest Hits (2001), and The Essential Alice in Chains (2006).

== Composition ==
The song is played in a mid-tempo, which contrasts with the faster paced and overall heavier sound found on most tracks from Alice in Chains' eponymous album.

== Lyrics ==
"Heaven Beside You" was written by Jerry Cantrell after the break-up with his girlfriend of seven years, Courtney Clarke. Cantrell was unable to remain faithful to the woman whom he described as "the most beautiful girl I've ever seen in my life," and added, "I still love her, but I'm too much of a fucking wolf—kill, attack, move on...It's so tough when you're so used to being hard. You can't tell an oak tree to be a pine."

In the liner notes of 1999's Music Bank box set collection, Jerry Cantrell said of the song:

Another attempt to reconcile the fact that my life and paths are tearing me apart from the person I love. All the things I write about her are a way for me to maybe speak to her, express things I could never express.

== Release and reception ==
"Heaven Beside You" was released as a single on January 29, 1996. "Heaven Beside You" peaked at number 52 on the Billboard Hot 100 Airplay chart, making it Alice in Chains' second-highest charting single after "No Excuses". "Heaven Beside You" peaked at number three on the Billboard Mainstream Rock Tracks chart and at number six on the Billboard Modern Rock Tracks chart. "Heaven Beside You" reached the top 40 in the UK and is their highest-charting song in Australia.

The song was made a single of the week in Melody Maker by Everett True, who wrote that it was "blessed with sublime chromatic harmonies" and that "Alice in Chains rock." Allmusic's Steve Huey regarded the song "among the band's best work." Ned Raggett of Allmusic said that the song "continued in the vein of Jar of Flies with its lead acoustic riff and generally low-key presentation" and added that "Cantrell's electric work is some of his best, moving beyond the admittedly powerful blasts of feedback he was known for to find a new, textured approach that balanced volume with a richer, less oppressive feel."

== Music video ==
The music video for "Heaven Beside You" was released in 1996 and was directed by Frank W. Ockenfels III. The video is available on the home video release Music Bank: The Videos.

== Live performances ==
Alice in Chains performed an acoustic version of "Heaven Beside You" for its appearance on MTV Unplugged in 1996, and the song was included on the Unplugged live album and home video release.

== Appearances in other media ==
The song was released as downloadable content for the Rock Band video game series on January 12, 2010.

It was also released as downloadable content for Rocksmith 2014 on December 12, 2017.

== Track listing ==
Version one
No.	Title	Writer(s)	Length
1.	"Heaven Beside You"	Jerry Cantrell; Mike Inez	5:27
2.	"Would?" (live)	Cantrell	3:27
3.	"Rooster" (live)	Cantrell	6:15
4.	"Junkhead" (live)	Cantrell; Layne Staley	5:09

Version two
No.	Title	Writer(s)	Length
1.	"Heaven Beside You"	Cantrell; Inez	5:27
2.	"Angry Chair" (live)	Staley	4:24
3.	"Man in the Box" (live)	Cantrell; Staley	5:46
4.	"Love, Hate, Love" (live)	Cantrell; Staley	7:50

== Personnel ==
- Jerry Cantrell – lead vocals, guitars
- Layne Staley – backing vocals
- Mike Inez – bass
- Sean Kinney – drums, percussion

== Chart positions ==
Chart (1996)	Peak position
Australia (ARIA)	60
Australia Hit Seekers (ARIA)	2
Canada Rock/Alternative (RPM)	22
European Hot 100 Singles (Music & Media)	94
UK Singles (Official Charts)	35
US Radio Songs (Billboard)	52
US Mainstream Rock (Billboard)	3
US Alternative Airplay (Billboard)	6

== Certifications ==
Region	Certification	Certified units/sales
United States (RIAA)	Gold	500,000^{‡}
^{‡} Sales+streaming figures based on certification alone.
