= Again (Alice in Chains song) =

1996 single by Alice in Chains

Single by Alice in Chains

from the album Alice in Chains
- Released: February 1996
- Studio: Bad Animals (Seattle, Washington)
- Genre: Grunge; alternative metal; sludge metal; hard rock
- Length: 4:05
- Label: Columbia
- Composer: Jerry Cantrell
- Lyricist: Layne Staley
- Producers: Toby Wright; Alice in Chains

Alice in Chains singles chronology
"Heaven Beside You" (1996)	"Again" (1996)	"Over Now" (1996)

Music video
- "Again" on YouTube

"Again" is a song by American rock band Alice in Chains. It was released as the third single from their self-titled 1995 album. It peaked at No. 8 on Billboard's Mainstream Rock Tracks chart, and was nominated for the Grammy Award for Best Hard Rock Performance in 1997. The song was included on the band's compilation albums Nothing Safe: Best of the Box (1999), Greatest Hits (2001) and The Essential Alice in Chains (2006). A remixed version of the song was included on the box set Music Bank (1999).

== Release and reception ==
"Again" made its radio debut in February 1996, and peaked at No. 8 on the Billboard Mainstream Rock Tracks chart in the week of July 6, 1996. It also peaked at No. 36 on the Billboard Modern Rock Tracks chart. The retail CD-single was only released in Japan on February 21, 1997, one year after it debuted in the United States.

The song was nominated for the Grammy Award for Best Hard Rock Performance in 1997.

In the liner notes of 1999's Music Bank box set collection, guitarist Jerry Cantrell said of the song:

This guy, Praga Kahn, did three different mixes. One I didn't like, the second one (Trip hop Mix) had horns and strings without too many guitars or drums, which I kinda liked. Then there was [the "Tattoo of Pain Mix"], which was cool too. We put a couple out as "B" sides in Europe. Personally, I never got used to the idea that you had to give some places extra songs and not others, it should be the same for everybody as far as I'm concerned.

== Music video ==
The music video for "Again" was released in March 1996, and was directed by George Vale and co-directed by Layne Staley. The video was nominated for Best Hard Rock Video at the 1996 MTV Video Music Awards.

The video is available on the home video release Music Bank: The Videos, and is the final Alice in Chains music video that Layne Staley filmed with the band (the "Get Born Again" music video released in 1999 featured only archived footage of the singer).

== Live performances ==
"Again" has been known to be performed with vocalist Layne Staley six times. They performed the song for the first on the TV show Saturday Night Special on April 20, 1996, and also for their appearance on the Late Show with David Letterman on May 10, 1996. The song was also performed during the four concerts that Alice in Chains opened for the reunited Kiss in late June and early July 1996.

A live performance of "Again" can be found on the live album Live (2000).

Since reuniting with new vocalist William DuVall in 2006, "Again" has become a regular part of the band's setlist.

== Track listing ==
CD single (Japan)
No.	Title	Length
1.	"Again"	4:05
2.	"Again" (Trip Hop mix)	4:39

Again remixes
No.	Title	Length
1.	"Again" (Club mix)	4:09
2.	"Again" (Tattoo of Pain mix)	4:02
3.	"Again"	4:05

== Personnel ==
- Layne Staley – lead vocals
- Jerry Cantrell – guitars, backing vocals
- Mike Inez – bass
- Sean Kinney – drums, percussion

== Charts ==
Chart (1996)	Peak position
US Mainstream Rock (Billboard)	8
US Alternative Airplay (Billboard)	36
