= Over Now (Alice in Chains song) =

1995 song by Alice in Chains

Song by Alice in Chains

from the album Alice in Chains
- Released: October 31, 1995
- Recorded: 1995
- Studio: Bad Animals, Seattle, Washington
- Genre: Acoustic rock; alternative rock; grunge
- Length: 7:03
- Label: Columbia
- Composers: Jerry Cantrell; Sean Kinney
- Lyricist: Jerry Cantrell
- Producers: Alice in Chains; Toby Wright

"Over Now"

Single by Alice in Chains

from the album Unplugged
- Released: July 17, 1996
- Recorded: April 10, 1996
- Venue: Majestic Theatre, Brooklyn Academy of Music, Brooklyn, New York
- Genre: Acoustic rock; alternative rock; grunge
- Length: 7:12
- Label: Columbia
- Composers: Jerry Cantrell; Sean Kinney
- Lyricist: Jerry Cantrell
- Producers: Toby Wright; Alice in Chains

Alice in Chains singles chronology
"Again" (1996)	"Over Now" (1996)	"Get Born Again" (1999)

Music video
- "Over Now" on YouTube

"Over Now" is a song by the American rock band Alice in Chains. Composed by Jerry Cantrell and Sean Kinney, with lyrics by Cantrell, who also sings lead vocals, the song is the last track on the band's third studio album, Alice in Chains (1995), and it is about the 1994 breakup of the band. The song closed the televised broadcast of Alice in Chains' MTV Unplugged performance, and that version was released as a single on July 17, 1996. The B-side is the original studio version. The single peaked at No. 4 on Billboard's Mainstream Rock chart, and at No. 24 on the Modern Rock Tracks chart in 1996. The song was included on the live album Unplugged (1996), on the box set Music Bank (1999), and the compilation album The Essential Alice in Chains (2006). The MTV Unplugged concert was the first and only time that Alice in Chains performed the song. It was performed again 23 years later at Jerry Cantrell's solo concert at the Pico Union Project in Los Angeles on December 6, 2019.

== Composition ==
Similar to "Heaven Beside You", it features mostly vocal work from guitarist Jerry Cantrell, with lead vocalist Layne Staley only harmonizing in the chorus. The song is written in open C# tuning, and marks the band's first time experimenting with it. In the liner notes of 1999's Music Bank box set collection, Cantrell said of the lengthy song: "A lot of deep shit in there, a big epic number. Plus you can get away with a hugely long tune near the end of a record."

== Lyrics ==
Bassist Mike Inez told RIP Magazine in February 1996 that it was either drummer Sean Kinney or guitarist/vocalist Jerry Cantrell who had the idea to start the song off with "Taps", a bugle call during flag ceremonies and at military funerals by the United States Armed Forces.

Many fans see this song—which begins with a traditional bugle quote of "Taps"—as an eerie foreshadowing of the band's ultimate demise because it is the closing track of their final studio album with Staley. Cantrell confirmed that sentiment in an interview with Request Magazine in February 1996:

That's about the band. It's about the breakup that took place between us. Those lines "Can you stand right here and look me in the eye and tell me it's over?" We couldn't, when it came right down to it. Even if it ended today, though, I love the guys in this band, even if we never recorded again. I would be sad, but if it came down to where it's killing us and we're growing too far apart... It's like that line, "When it's all worn out, I'd rather go without."

And Kinney added:

Yeah, the last thing we'd want to do is fall on our faces in front of 30,000 people every night. We didn't want to end up like fat Elvis, doped up on pills, crying onstage in Vegas.

== Release and reception ==
The acoustic version of "Over Now" from the band's MTV Unplugged performance was released to US radio on July 17, 1996, and peaked at No. 4 on Billboard's Mainstream Rock chart, and at No. 24 on the Modern Rock Tracks chart. It was released commercially as a single in Australia.

AllMusic's Steve Huey regarded the song "among the band's best work."

== Music video ==
The video of the song from the performance on MTV Unplugged is considered a music video, much like the live video of "Bleed the Freak", used in support of their Live album. The video is available on the home video release Music Bank: The Videos.

== Live performances ==
Alice in Chains performed an acoustic version of "Over Now" for its appearance on MTV Unplugged in 1996, and the song was included on the Unplugged live album and home video release. The performance from MTV Unplugged can also be found on the box set Music Bank, the home video release Music Bank: The Videos, and the compilation album The Essential Alice in Chains. On the CD version of the MTV Unplugged concert, as Staley says "Okay, that's it," at the end of the song, booing can be heard (presumably due to the performance concluding). Staley responded to the heckler by shouting, "Hey, fuck you, man!" which was greeted by laughter from the audience.

Jerry Cantrell performed "Over Now" during his solo concert at the Pico Union Project in Los Angeles on December 6, 2019. It was the first time he performed the song since the MTV Unplugged.

== Track listing ==
No.	Title	Length
1.	"Over Now" (Unplugged)	7:12
2.	"Over Now" (album version)	7:03

== Personnel ==
- Jerry Cantrell – lead vocals, guitar
- Layne Staley – backing vocals
- Mike Inez – bass
- Sean Kinney – drums, percussion
- Scott Olson – acoustic guitar (Unplugged version only)

== Charts ==
Chart (1996)	Peak position
Australia Hit Seekers (ARIA)	15
Canada Top Singles (RPM)	50
Canada Hit Parade (The Record)	38
US Mainstream Rock Airplay (Billboard)	4
US Alternative Airplay (Billboard)	24

== Release history ==
Release dates and formats for "Over Now" (Unplugged version)
Region	Date	Format(s)	Label(s)	Ref.
United States	July 17, 1996	Mainstream rock radio; modern rock radio	Columbia	
