= Music Bank: The Videos =

Video by Alice in Chains
- Released: October 26, 1999
- Recorded: 1988–1998
- Genre: Grunge, alternative rock, alternative metal, heavy metal
- Label: Columbia
- Producer: Peter Fletcher

Alice in Chains chronology
Unplugged (1996)	Music Bank: The Videos (1999)

Music Bank: The Videos is a video release by rock band Alice in Chains containing all of the band's music videos (at the time). It was originally released on VHS in 1999 and was re-released in 2001 on DVD. The video has been certified gold by the RIAA with excess sales of 50,000 copies.

== Overview ==
Interspersed between most of the videos are home video clips of the band on the road and in the studio. An early documentary of the band is also included which shows their life before signing to Columbia, and features performances of the early songs "Social Parasite", "I Can't Have You Blues" and "Queen of the Rodeo".

The audio for all songs was remixed by Toby Wright, with several songs featuring vocal tracks and guitar tracks not present on the albums and not heard elsewhere.

It is named after Ballard Music Bank - an abandoned warehouse that served as rehearsal space and often a living quarters for many bands in Seattle. Alice in Chains, Pearl Jam, Soundgarden, Green River, Mudhoney, Temple of the Dog, Mother Love Bone and many other acts used that space at some point.

== Track listing ==
1. "King 5 Documentary"
2. "We Die Young" (Art Institute of Seattle Version)
3. "We Die Young"
4. "Man in the Box"
5. "Sea of Sorrow"
6. "Would?"
7. "Them Bones"
8. "Angry Chair"
9. "Rooster" (Uncut Version)
10. "What the Hell Have I"
11. "Down in a Hole"
12. "No Excuses"
13. "I Stay Away"
14. "Grind"
15. "Heaven Beside You"
16. "Again"
17. "Over Now" (MTV Unplugged)
18. "Get Born Again"

== Chart positions ==
Chart (1999)	Peak position
US Top Music Videos	11

== Certifications ==
Region	Certification	Certified units/sales
United States (RIAA)	Gold	50,000^{^}
^{^} Shipments figures based on certification alone.
