= Turner Microphone Company =

American manufacturer of microphones

The Turner Microphone Company was an American manufacturer of microphones in Cedar Rapids, Iowa from 1931 to 1979. Turner operated as a small company but produced and sold many well made but modestly priced microphones. Many of the microphones they produced were general purpose bullet-style microphones and CB radio communications microphones. Many of the company's 1940s-1950s microphones had an Art Deco appearance.

== History ==
The Turner Microphone company was founded by David Turner and Everett Foster in Cedar Rapids, Iowa in 1931. The company soon began making microphones and public address systems. Turner opened a larger factory in 1936 and produced a large quantity of microphones and grew to 1200 employees by the 1970s. The company was sold to Telex in 1978 and ceased operations in 1979.

== Notable models ==
The Model 22 was a very popular microphone throughout the 1940s and 1950s which was offered with both a crystal and ceramic element. This model featured a brushed nickel finish and an art deco styling with Turner's distinctive shark fin on top.

The CD, BD, CX, Challenger was another very popular microphone of the era. This model featured an Art Deco styling with a distinctive “shark fin” on the top. It was produced from 1940 to 1948. The microphone was offered in both Brown and brushed Chrome with options of a crystal or dynamic element. The Challenger models have become highly sought after by collectors due to its styling and use by Blues harmonica players.

The Model 33 was a large chrome-finished microphone with an Art Deco styling offered in both a crystal and dynamic element. It was produced from the 1940s to the 1950s.
