= Jar of Flies =

EP by Alice in Chains
- Released: January 25, 1994
- Recorded: September 7–14, 1993
- Studio: London Bridge (Seattle)
- Genres: Acoustic rock; grunge; hard rock
- Length: 30:49
- Label: Columbia
- Producer: Alice in Chains

Alice in Chains chronology
Dirt (1992)	Jar of Flies (1994)	Alice in Chains (1995)

Singles from Jar of Flies
- 1. "No Excuses" Released: January 1994

Jar of Flies is the third studio EP by American rock band Alice in Chains. It was released on January 25, 1994, by Columbia Records. Jar of Flies was the band's second acoustic EP, after 1992's Sap, and it was the first EP in music history to debut at No. 1 on the Billboard 200 chart, with the first week sales exceeding 141,000 copies in the United States. The self-produced record was written and recorded over the course of just one week at the London Bridge Studio in Seattle. The tracks "No Excuses", "I Stay Away" and "Don't Follow" were released as radio singles to promote the EP. Jar of Flies was nominated for two Grammy Awards in 1995: Best Recording Package and Best Hard Rock Performance for "I Stay Away".

The EP was well received by critics and has been certified quadruple platinum by the Recording Industry Association of America (RIAA), making Jar of Flies one of the band's most successful releases. In Canada, Jar of Flies was certified double platinum for sales of 200,000 copies. In the United Kingdom, the EP was certified silver after selling 60,000 copies there.

== Background and recording ==
Following Alice in Chains' extensive 1993 world tour for Dirt, bassist Mike Starr getting fired during the tour for his drug use, and Ozzy Osbourne bassist Mike Inez joining the band, the members returned home to Seattle after the end of their Lollapalooza tour and found themselves evicted from their residence after failing to pay the rent. Homeless, the band then moved into the London Bridge Studio in Seattle.

During Alice in Chains' June–August 1993 appearance at Lollapalooza, guitarist Jerry Cantrell called producer Toby Wright with a proposal to collaborate on new material. Wright reacted positively and booked ten days at the London Bridge Studio. Despite Cantrell's assurances, the band did not have any planned tracks before the session began. Drummer Sean Kinney had said, "After playing loud music for a year, we'd come home and the last thing we wanted to do was crank up the amps right away. That stuff was written on buses and whenever we had downtime. We did Jar of Flies to see how it was to record with [bassist] Mike Inez. We just went into the studio with no songs written, to check out the chemistry. It all fell into place. The sounds and the tones were really good. We thought it would be a waste not to put that material out."

The first session took place on September 7, 1993. Vocalist Layne Staley said the band "just wanted to go into the studio for a few days with our acoustic guitars and see what happened. We never really planned on the music we made at that time to be released. But the record label heard it and they really liked it. For us, it was just the experience of four guys getting together in the studio and making some music." The album's sessions lasted 14–18 hours a day, and recording was complete within seven days. Assistant engineer Jonathan Plum described the sessions as "exhaustive". The album was recorded on tape on a Neve 80-68 mixing console because Wright wanted the album's acoustic sound to be as natural as possible. Staley instructed that Pro Tools not be used within the studio; as Wright explained, "Layne absolutely had a working knowledge of his sonic preferences in the studio - and felt analog sounded better for the band's sound." The album's tracks were mostly recorded within one or two takes.

The album's acoustic guitar sound was particularly focused on. Wright recalled that "at some points we overdubbed some acoustics with micing those acoustics, but when they were recording live off the floor, I'd use whatever pick-ups [Cantrell] had in his guitars at the time, trying to keep that sound as close to acoustic-sounding as possible. So that it sounded like it was an acoustic guitar instead of an electrified acoustic guitar." Cantrell used Ovation guitars during the album's sessions. To reflect the recording's acoustic climate, Kinney sometimes used brushes to obtain a softer feel. AKG 414 microphones were used for overhead registration, while D-12s were used for the floor and rack toms, and Sennheiser MD 421s were placed on the kick drum. 451s and 57s were mounted on the top side of the snare drum, while a 441 was fitted on the bottom side.

The characteristic syncopated drum opening in "No Excuses" was a result of Kinney's improvised experimentation with side-stick drumming. Wright was not an advocate of the technique and said that they "eventually wound up with some bongos and some smaller drums set up over the hi-hat that we incorporated into that groove." Staley wrote much of the album's lyrics within the studio and arranged the album's vocal harmonies. Wright recalled the pace of Staley's work as quick, and that the vocal tracks were recorded within one or two takes via a Neumann M-49 microphone. Cantrell performed the lead vocals in the track "Don't Follow". Wright described Cantrell as an "awesome" singer, and stressed that "you couldn't have done all those harmonies without him." The album's sessions concluded on September 14. Wright mixed the album at Scream Studios in Los Angeles, California from September 17–22.

== Music and lyrics ==
Due to the dominance of acoustic instruments in Jar of Flies, the album is often considered a continuation of the sound adopted by the band on the 1992 EP Sap. The album demonstrates the band's wide range by offering a variety of tracks with an acoustic texture, featuring elements of blues rock and jangle pop. Steve Huey of AllMusic stressed that "the mood is still hopelessly bleak, but the poignant, introspective tone produces a sense of acceptance that's actually soothing, in a funereal sort of way. Jerry Cantrell's arrangements keep growing more detailed and layered; while there are a few noisy moments, most of Jar of Flies is bathed in a clean, shimmering ambience whose source is difficult to pin down". Paul Evans of Rolling Stone stated that Staley's vocals on the tracks "Swing on This" and "Rotten Apple" "ow[e] as much to Styx and Kansas as Jerry Cantrell’s guitars do to Black Sabbath", and that the vocals "evoke pathos as well as anger." Tom Sinclair of Entertainment Weekly noted that "No Excuses" has a '70s-influenced style and described "Swing on This" as "postmodern boogie-woogie". The album's lyrics are dark and gloomy, with Huey writing that "Jar of Flies is about living with the consequences, full of deeply felt reflections on loneliness, self-imposed isolation, and lost human connections." Jon Pareles of The New York Times observed that "Alice in Chains prizes solitude on Jar of Flies, a set of songs about rugged individualism turned into exile."

== Title and packaging ==
The album's title originates from a science experiment that Cantrell conducted in third grade. The experiment consisted of maintaining two jars full of flies. The flies in one jar would be overfed, while the flies in the other jar would be underfed. The flies that were overfed reproduced rapidly, but then died from overcrowding. The flies that were underfed managed to survive throughout the year. Concerning the anecdote, Staley said "I guess there's a message in there somewhere. Evidently that experiment had a big impact on Jerry."

Rocky Schenck photographed the album cover in his dining room on September 8, 1993. As he recalled, "The band had come up with the idea for the title and wanted the cover to be a young boy looking into a jar filled with flies. I remember they asked me to use 'crazy colors' in the shot, so I utilized lots of different gels over the lights to achieve the final look." Schenck's assistant took several trips to a nearby horse stable where he caught hundreds of flies using a butterfly net. On January 27, 2019, two days following the album's 25th anniversary, Schenck published rare outtakes from the album cover shoot on his Instagram account and said that he has forgotten the name of the child on the cover.

The first pressing of the compact disc for Jar of Flies included plastic flies visible on the front view of the clear spine. It earned a Grammy nomination for Best Recording Package. The record received a multi-format reissue for its 30th anniversary in 2024. One of them was a vinyl record with the carcasses of real flies pressed into it and limited to 100 copies.

== Release and reception ==
Professional ratings
Contemporary reviews
Review scores
Source	Rating
Chicago Tribune	3/4 stars
Daily News	4/5 stars
Entertainment Weekly	B−
Houston Chronicle	3.5/5 stars
Los Angeles Times	2/4 stars
NME	4/10
The Philadelphia Inquirer	4/4 stars
Q	4/5 stars
Rolling Stone	4/5 stars

Professional ratings
Retrospective reviews
Review scores
Source	Rating
AllMusic	4/5 stars
Consequence	A+
The Encyclopedia of Popular Music	4/5 stars
The Great Rock Discography	7/10
MusicHound Rock	3/5 stars
Music Story	4.5 stars
Paste	9.5/10
The Rolling Stone Album Guide	3.5/5 stars
Spin Alternative Record Guide	8/10
Sputnikmusic	4.5/5

Jar of Flies was released on January 25, 1994, by Columbia Records. The album was promoted by two singles, "No Excuses" and "I Stay Away", both of which received music videos. "No Excuses" reached No. 1 on the Album Rock Tracks chart, becoming the first single by the band to do so. Cantrell admitted that "we couldn't believe that it did so well," and that "the success of Jar of Flies showed us that we could do what we liked and that other people would like it too." A limited edition Enhanced CD was produced. This version of the album includes a lyric sheet, a biography and discography of the band, the music videos for "No Excuses" and "I Stay Away" and fragments of interviews with the musicians. In addition, 2,500 copies were made of a double EP including Jar of Flies and Sap.

The album entered the Billboard 200 chart at number one; with first week sales of over 141,000 copies, becoming the first ever EP and first Alice in Chains release to top the charts. It would be the only EP to have this distinction until 2004, when the Collision Course mashup EP by Jay-Z and Linkin Park also achieved the number one, followed by Bad Meets Evil's EP Hell: The Sequel in 2011. Jar of Flies sold 2,037,853 copies during its first year and was later certified triple platinum in 1995 and quadruple platinum in 2022.

Paul Evans of Rolling Stone called the EP "darkly gorgeous", and Steve Huey stated "Jar of Flies is a low-key stunner, achingly gorgeous and harrowingly sorrowful all at once."

=== Awards and accolades ===
The album was nominated for a Grammy Award for Best Recording Package in 1995, but lost to Buddy Jackson for "Tribute to the Music of Bob Wills and the Texas Playboys" performed by Asleep at the Wheel. The single "I Stay Away" was nominated for the Best Hard Rock Performance.

In November 2011, Jar of Flies was ranked No. 4 on Guitar World's top ten list of guitar albums of 1994.

It was featured on Guitar World's "Superunknown: 50 Iconic Albums That Defined 1994" list, in 2014.

In April 2014, Jar of Flies was ranked No. 12 on Rolling Stone's "40 Best Records from Mainstream Alternative's Greatest Year" list. In May 2014, the EP was placed at No. 5 on Loudwire's "10 Best Hard Rock Albums of 1994" list.

In April 2019, the EP was ranked No. 42 on Rolling Stone's "50 Greatest Grunge Albums" list.

== Track listing ==
All lyrics are written by Layne Staley, except where noted.

No.	Title	Lyrics	Music	Length
1.	"Rotten Apple"		Jerry Cantrell; Mike Inez	6:58
2.	"Nutshell"		Cantrell; Inez; Sean Kinney	4:19
3.	"I Stay Away"		Cantrell; Inez	4:14
4.	"No Excuses"	Cantrell	Cantrell	4:15
5.	"Whale & Wasp"	instrumental	Cantrell	2:37
6.	"Don't Follow"	Cantrell	Cantrell	4:22
7.	"Swing on This"		Cantrell; Inez; Kinney	4:04
Total length:				30:49

== Personnel ==
Alice in Chains

- Layne Staley – vocals
- Jerry Cantrell – guitars, vocals
- Mike Inez – bass, additional vocals
- Sean Kinney – drums, percussion

Additional performers

- April Acevez – viola
- Rebecca Clemons-Smith – violin
- Matthew Weiss – violin
- Justine Foy – violoncello
- David Atkinson – harmonica
- Randy Biro – additional vocals
- Darrel Peters – additional vocals

Production

- Produced by Alice in Chains
- Engineered and mixed by Toby Wright
- Assisted by Liz Sroka and Jon Plum
- Art direction by Mary Maurer
- Photography by Rocky Schenck
- Band photography by Pete Cronin
- Electron Microscope photography by Alicia K. Thompson

== Charts ==
=== Weekly charts ===
1994 weekly chart performance for Jar of Flies
Chart (1994)	Peak position
Australian Albums (ARIA) with Sap	2
Austrian Albums (Ö3 Austria)	22
Canada Top Albums/CDs (RPM)	5
Danish Singles (IFPI)	5
Dutch Albums (Album Top 100)	17
Finnish Albums (Suomen virallinen lista)	3
German Albums (Offizielle Top 100)	25
New Zealand Albums (RMNZ)	1
Norwegian Albums (VG-lista)	7
Scottish Albums (Official Charts)	79
Swedish Albums (Sverigetopplistan)	6
Swedish Albums (Sverigetopplistan) with Sap	8
Swiss Albums (Schweizer Hitparade)	31
UK Albums (Official Charts) with Sap	4
US Billboard 200	1

2024 weekly chart performance for Jar of Flies
Chart (2024)	Peak position
Belgian Albums (Ultratop Flanders)	195
Belgian Albums (Ultratop Wallonia)	82
Canadian Albums (Billboard)	68
Croatian International Albums (HDU)	15
Hungarian Physical Albums (MAHASZ)	22
Icelandic Albums (Tónlistinn)	28
Portuguese Albums (AFP)	80
US Top Alternative Albums (Billboard)	10
US Top Catalog Albums (Billboard)	35
US Top Hard Rock Albums (Billboard)	3
US Top Rock Albums (Billboard)	14

=== Year-end charts ===
Year-end chart performance for Jar of Flies
Chart (1994)	Position
US Billboard 200	52

== Certifications ==
Certifications for Jar of Flies
Region	Certification	Certified units/sales
Canada (Music Canada)	2× Platinum	200,000^{^}
New Zealand (RMNZ)	Platinum	15,000^{^}
United Kingdom (BPI)	Silver	60,000^{^}
United States (RIAA)	4× Platinum	4,000,000^{‡}
^{^} Shipments figures based on certification alone.^{‡} Sales+streaming figures based on certification alone.

== Bibliography ==
- de Sola, David (2015). Alice in Chains: The Untold Story. Thomas Dunne Books. ISBN 978-1250048073.
- Anderson, Kyle (2007). Accidental Revolution: The Story of Grunge. St. Martin’s Griffin. ISBN 978-0312358198.
- Yarm, Mark (2012). Everybody Loves Our Town: An Oral History of Grunge. Three Rivers Press. ISBN 978-0307464446.
- Prato, Greg (2009). Grunge Is Dead: The Oral History of Seattle Rock Music. Toronto: ECW Press. ISBN 978-1550228779.
- Brown, Jake (2010). Alice in Chains: In the Studio. Rock N Roll Books. ISBN 978-0-9726142-6-9.
