= No Excuses (Alice in Chains song) =

1994 single by Alice in Chains

Single by Alice in Chains

from the EP Jar of Flies
- Released: January 1994
- Recorded: September 1993
- Studio: London Bridge (Seattle)
- Genre: Acoustic rock; alternative rock; grunge; jangle pop
- Length: 4:15
- Label: Columbia
- Songwriter: Jerry Cantrell
- Producers: Alice in Chains; Toby Wright

Alice in Chains singles chronology
"Down in a Hole" (1993)	"No Excuses" (1994)	"I Stay Away" (1994)

Music video
- "No Excuses" on YouTube

"No Excuses" is a song by American rock band Alice in Chains. It was released as the lead single from their third studio EP, Jar of Flies (1994). Written by guitarist and co-lead vocalist Jerry Cantrell, the song was well received by music critics and was a charting success, becoming the first Alice in Chains song to reach No. 1 on Billboard's Album Rock Tracks chart, spending a total of 26 weeks on the chart.

"No Excuses" was included on the greatest hits albums Nothing Safe: Best of the Box (1999) and Greatest Hits (2001), as well as on the box set Music Bank (1999) and on the compilation album The Essential Alice in Chains (2006). Alice In Chains performed an acoustic version of "No Excuses" for its appearance on MTV Unplugged in 1996, which marked the last time they performed the song with Layne Staley, and that version was included on the band's Unplugged live album and home video release.

== Musical content ==
=== Composition ===
"No Excuses" is based around a jangly A-to-B major barre chord change, with the open B and E strings ringing out.

=== Musical style ===
"No Excuses" use of open, ringing strings has been compared to the style of American rock band R.E.M., while Guitar Player wrote that Kinney's "crisp, splashy" drum grooves could "turn The Police's Stewart Copeland's head".

== Release and reception ==
"No Excuses" was released as a single in 1994. The song found moderate airplay on alternative rock radio. It peaked at No. 48 on Billboard's Hot 100 Airplay chart, making it the only Alice in Chains song to reach the top 50. Although Alice in Chains fared well on mainstream rock radio, "No Excuses" was their only song to hit No. 1 on Billboard's Album Rock Tracks chart until "Check My Brain" in 2009. "No Excuses" also peaked at No. 3 on Billboard's Modern Rock Tracks chart and at No. 32 on the Top 40/Mainstream chart. In Canada, it rose to No. 17 on the RPM 100 Hit Tracks chart and was the 98th-most successful hit of 1994.

Ned Raggett of AllMusic said that the song "proved in spades that Alice in Chains were far more than oppressive doom-mongers" and added, "Topped off with a catchy chorus, it made for another high point for a band seemingly blessed with them."

== Music video ==
The music video for "No Excuses" was released in 1994 and was directed by Matt Mahurin, who had previously directed the "Angry Chair" music video for the band. Layne Staley and Jerry Cantrell are the only band members to be featured in the video. It also features actor Max Perlich. The video is available on the home video release Music Bank: The Videos (1999).

== Live performances ==
The band performed an acoustic version of "No Excuses" for its appearance on MTV Unplugged in 1996, and the song was included on the Unplugged live album and home video release. This was the last time the band performed the song with Staley. Guitarist Jerry Cantrell also performed the song during his 1998 Boggy Depot solo tour.

== Track listing ==
All tracks are written by Jerry Cantrell.

No.	Title	Length
1.	"No Excuses"	4:16
2.	"Brother" (from Sap)	4:27

== Personnel ==
- Layne Staley – vocals
- Jerry Cantrell – vocals, guitars
- Mike Inez – bass
- Sean Kinney – drums, percussion

== Charts ==
=== Weekly charts ===
Chart (1994)	Peak position
Canada Top Singles (RPM)	17
Canada Contemporary Hit Radio (The Record)	20
US Radio Songs (Billboard)	48
US Alternative Airplay (Billboard)	3
US Mainstream Rock (Billboard)	1
US Pop Airplay (Billboard)	32

=== Year-end charts ===
Chart (1994)	Position
Canada Top Singles (RPM)	98
US Album Rock Tracks (Billboard)	4
US Modern Rock Tracks (Billboard)	30

== Certifications ==
Region	Certification	Certified units/sales
United States (RIAA)	Gold	500,000^{‡}
^{‡} Sales+streaming figures based on certification alone.
