= Rocky Schenck =

American photographer and music video director

- Born: April 18, 1955 (age 71); Austin, Texas
- Occupations: Photographer; music video director
- Years active: 1975–present

Rocky Schenck (born April 18, 1955) is an American photographer and music video director. Schenck has photographed several album covers and has written and directed numerous music videos and short films. He has shot fashion, editorial and portraits for magazines such as Vogue, Rolling Stone, Time, New York Times, Entertainment Weekly, and others. Schenck has collaborated with many personalities in the music and entertainment worlds, including Alice in Chains, Jerry Cantrell, Adele, Ozzy Osbourne, John Prine , Robert Plant, Willie Nelson, B.B. King, Stevie Nicks, Nick Cave, P.J. Harvey, Annie Lennox, Alison Krauss, Ray Bradbury, Ellen DeGeneres, Baz Luhrmann, Kylie Minogue, T-Bone Burnett, Joni Mitchell, The Cramps, Tom Cruise, Johnny Mathis, Linda Ronstadt, Sheryl Crow, Josh Duhamel, Diana Krall, Brian Wilson, Donna Summer, Nicole Kidman, Gary Coleman, k.d. lang, Jerry Lee Lewis, Natalie Cole, Gloria Estefan, Neil Diamond, Laurence Fishburne, Gladys Knight, Frances Bean Cobain, and Rod Stewart.

== Biography ==
Schenck was born in Austin, Texas, and when he was five years old his family moved to an isolated 800-acre ranch in central Texas, near the town of Dripping Springs, where his view of the outside world came from the movies he watched on television. "Movies were the closest things to the dreams I was having", Schenck said. Schenck's ancestors included two noted Texas painters, Hermann Lungkwitz and Richard Petri.

At age 12, he began studying oil painting, and at age 13 he started selling his work professionally. In his early teens, Schenck began writing, directing and photographing short experimental films and learning still photography while shooting production stills on the sets of his movies.

Schenck majored in art at North Texas State University. Encouraged by a friend, Schenck left college early and moved to Los Angeles to work with film and photography. Artists in different fields began approaching him for their projects, which led him to create a diverse portfolio of fine art, portraiture, film and theater work.

A gallery owner in New York discovered Schenck's work and gave him his first photography exhibition, followed by a second exhibition a year later. Since then, Schenck has continued to show in galleries around the world and his work is now included in several prestigious museum and private collections.

Director William Friedkin used Schenck's art photographs as sets in his productions of the opera The Makropulos Affair in Florence, Italy and in the Bartok opera Duke Bluebeard's Castle in Los Angeles.

A collection of Rocky Schenck's photographs was published by the University of Texas Press in 2003. The Recurring Dream, Schenck's second book of fine art photographs, was published in 2016.

== Published works ==
His published collections include:

- Rocky Schenck: Photographs (2003, University of Texas Press) ISBN 978-0-292-70217-2
- The Recurring Dream (2016, University of Texas Press) ISBN 978-1-4773-1066-3

== Album covers ==
- Music That You Can Dance To (1986) by Sparks
- Facelift (1990) by Alice in Chains
- Sap (1992) by Alice in Chains
- Dirt (1992) by Alice in Chains
- Jar of Flies (1994) by Alice in Chains
- Boggy Depot (1998) by Jerry Cantrell

== Selected videos ==
- Ace of Base - "Lucky Love"
- Adele - "Hometown Glory"
- Afghan Whigs - "Gentlemen"
- Alice in Chains - "We Die Young"/"Them Bones"/"What the Hell Have I"/Grind"/"The Nona Tapes"
- Marc Anthony - "When I Dream at Night"
- David Arnold and David McAlmont - "Diamonds Are Forever"
- Barnes and Barnes - "Fish Heads"/"Soak It Up"
- Cindy Lee Berryhill - "Indirectly Yours"
- Book of Love - "Alice Everyday"
- Peabo Bryson - "Can You Stop the Rain"
- Jerry Cantrell - "My Song"
- Nick Cave and The Bad Seeds (with PJ Harvey) - "Henry Lee"
- Nick Cave (with Kylie Minogue) - "Where the Wild Roses Grow"
- Paul Westerberg - "Love Untold"
- Combustible Edison - "Vertigogo"
- The Cramps - "Bikini Girls with Machine Guns"/"Creature from the Black Leather Lagoon"
- Iris Dement - "Our Town"
- Willy Deville - "Hey Joe"
- Devo - "Post-Post Modern Man"
- Dramarama - "Haven't Got a Clue"
- Gloria Estefan - "Everlasting Love"/"Party Time"
- Faster Pussycat - "You're So Vain"
- Delta Goodrem - "In This Life"
- Nanci Griffith - "This Heart"
- Emmylou Harris - "Thanks to You"
- Imperial Teen - "Yoo-Hoo"
- Jellyfish - "That Is Why"
- Diana Krall - "Let's Face the Music"
- Alison Krauss (featuring John Waite) - "Missing You"
- Alison Krauss and Union Station - "Maybe"/"New Favorite"
- Luna - "Slash Your Tires"
- Martika - "Coloured Kisses"
- Joey McIntyre - "Stay the Same"
- Meat Puppets - "Backwater"
- Joni Mitchell - "Come in from the Cold"
- Joni Mitchell and Seal - "How Do You Stop?"
- Stevie Nicks (with Sheryl Crow) - "If You Ever Did Believe"
- Robert Plant and Alison Krauss - "Gone, Gone, Gone"/"Please Read the Letter"
- Raging Slab - "Anywhere but Here"/"Bent for Silver"/"Don't Dog Me"
- Redd Kross - "Annie's Gone"/"Jimmy's Fantasy"/"The Lady In The Front Row"
- Seed - "Rapture"
- Sponge - "Have You Seen Mary"
- Lisa Stansfield - "Never, Never Gonna Give You Up"
- Rod Stewart - "If We Fall in Love Tonight"
- Sugarland - "Everyday America"
- Donna Summer - "I Will Go with You"
- Supersuckers - "Born with a Tail"
- Van Halen - "Fire in the Hole"/"Human Beings"
- Billy Vera and The Beaters - "I Can Take Care of Myself"
- Visiting Kids - "Trilobites"
- Paul Westerberg - "World Class Fad"
- Chris Whitley - "Living with the Law"
- Trisha Yearwood - "Georgia Rain"
