= Sean Kinney =

American drummer (born 1966)

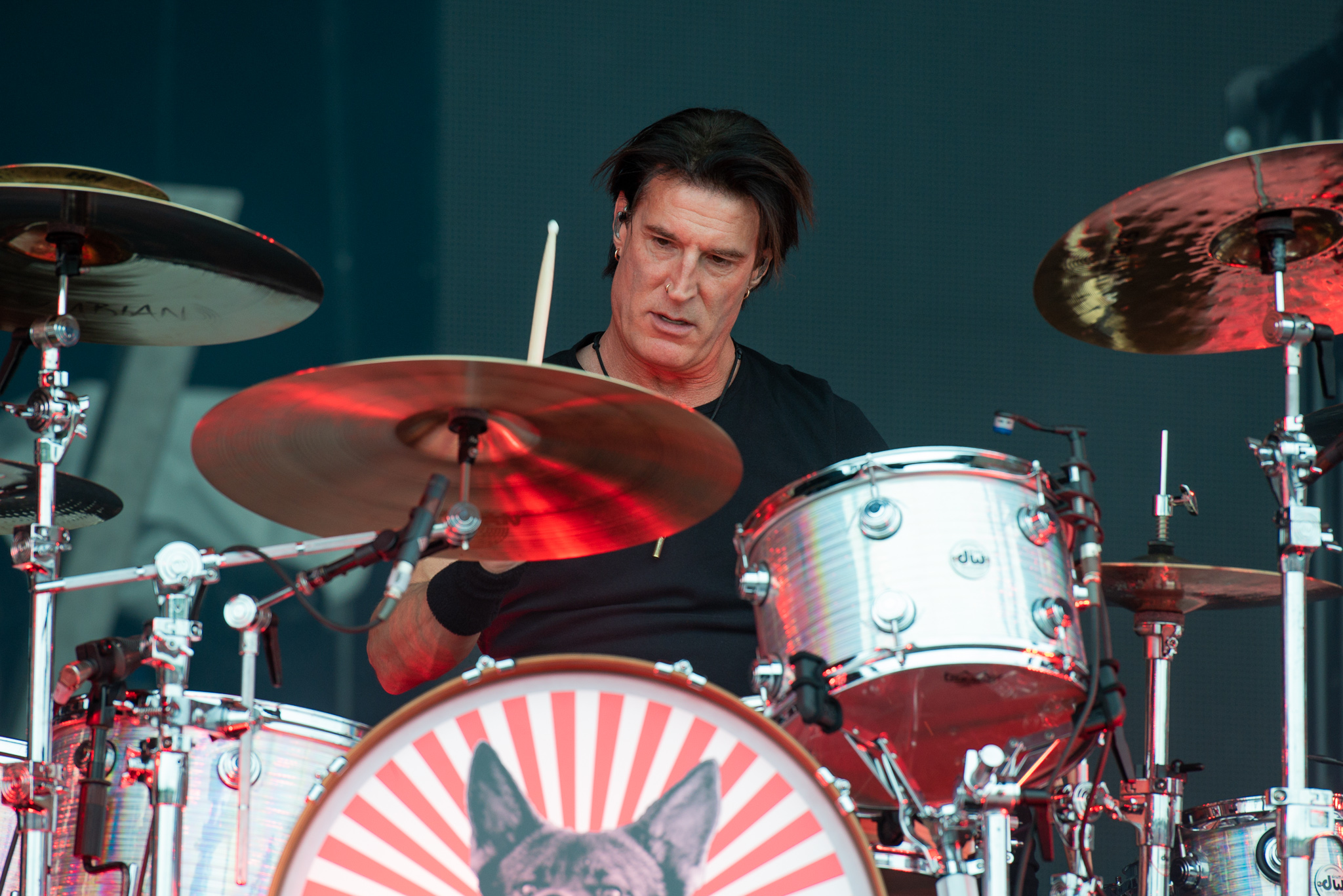
- Kinney performing with Alice in Chains in 2019

Background information
- Born: Sean Howard Kinney; May 27, 1966 (age 60); Renton, Washington, U.S.
- Genres: Grunge; alternative metal; heavy metal; sludge metal; hard rock
- Occupation: Musician
- Instruments: Drums; percussion
- Years active: 1976–present
- Member of: Alice in Chains
- Formerly of: Spys4Darwin

Sean Howard Kinney (born May 27, 1966) is an American musician, best known as the drummer and co-founder of the rock band Alice in Chains. Kinney also founded the short-lived supergroup Spys4Darwin, and has collaborated with other artists such as Johnny Cash and Metallica. He played drums for his Alice in Chains bandmate, Jerry Cantrell's debut solo album, Boggy Depot (1998). Since 2009, Kinney has been co-owner of The Crocodile club in Seattle. He was a guest drummer on NBC's Late Night with Seth Meyers in September 2018. Kinney has earned nine Grammy Award nominations as a member of Alice in Chains.

== Biography ==
Sean Howard Kinney was born in Renton, Washington, on May 27, 1966. His father was a police officer and his mother was a city official.

Kinney's interest in music was developed at an early age. He got his first drum kit when he was 5 years old. By the age of 9, he was the drummer for his grandfather's band, The Cross Cats, and was traveling the Northwest playing small venues. Kinney grew up in Renton, where he attended Liberty Senior High School in the Issaquah School District.

== Alice in Chains ==
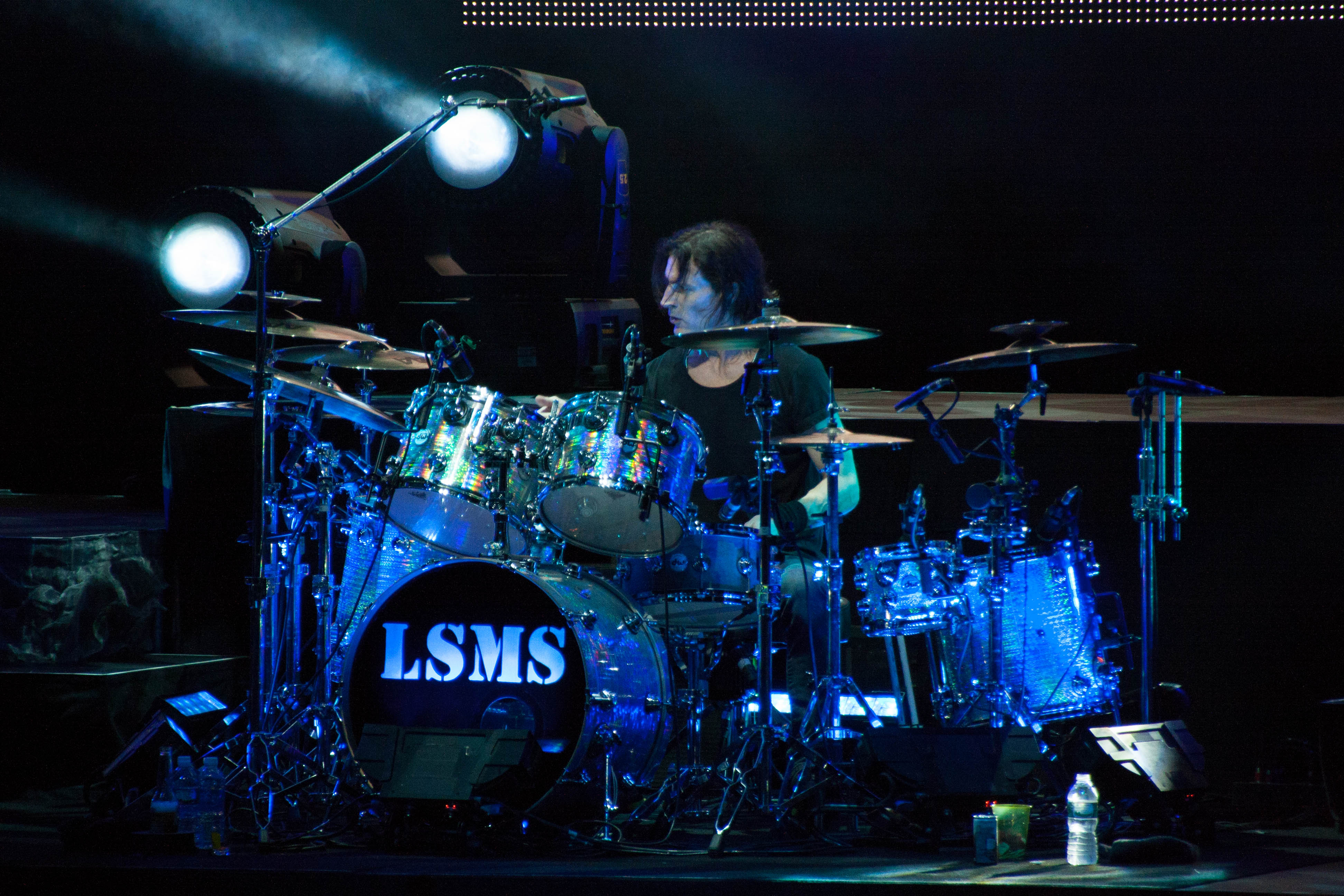
Kinney performing with Alice in Chains at the Uproar Festival in 2013, with the initials "LSMS" on his drumkit in tribute to Layne Staley and Mike Starr

Kinney met singer Layne Staley around 1985, when Staley's band Sleze was playing at Alki Beach. Kinney revealed to Guitar Legends magazine that in their first meeting he told Staley that he was cool but his band sucked, and that he should get a different drummer, so Kinney suggested himself. Kinney did not have a phone at the time, so he gave Staley a piece of paper with his girlfriend's number.

Kinney met up with Alice in Chains in 1987, when guitarist Jerry Cantrell wanted to form a new band after his band Diamond Lie broke up, so his roommate Layne Staley gave him the phone number of Kinney's girlfriend, Melinda Starr, so that Cantrell could talk to Kinney and set up a meeting. Kinney and his girlfriend went to the Music Bank in Seattle where Cantrell was living and listened to his demos. Cantrell mentioned that they needed a bass player to jam with them, and he already had someone in mind: Mike Starr, with whom Cantrell had played in a band in Burien called Gypsy Rose. Kinney then mentioned that his girlfriend was actually Starr's sister, and that he had been playing in bands together with Starr since they were kids. Kinney called Starr and a few days later he started jamming with him and Cantrell at the Music Bank, but they didn't have a singer. Cantrell, Starr, and Kinney wanted Staley to be their lead singer, so they started auditioning terrible lead singers in front of Staley to send a hint. The last straw for Staley was when they auditioned a male stripper – he decided to join the band after that. Starr was replaced by former Ozzy Osbourne bassist Mike Inez in 1993.

Kinney almost didn't play on Alice in Chains' debut album, Facelift. He had broken his hand and the band started rehearsing with Greg Gilmore, the drummer from Mother Love Bone. Kinney explained in the 2009 book Grunge is Dead:

I almost didn't play on the record – they started rehearsing with the drummer from Mother Love Bone, Greg Gilmore. I was sitting there playing with one hand, guiding him through it. Dave Jerden came in and they started to try to do it. He was like, 'Screw it – pull the plug. This is not going to be the same.' Luckily, we took a tiny bit of time off. I had that cast on for a while, and was like, 'I can't miss this.' I cut my cast off in the studio and kept a bucket of ice by the drum set. Kept my hand iced down and played with a broken hand. I tried not to do that again – your first big break, and you fuck it up.

Since the band's inception, Kinney has been the only drummer. He also played piano and sang chorus vocals through a megaphone on the hidden song from Sap entitled "Love Song". The album was named after a dream Kinney had about the band recording some light acoustic songs for an album they name Sap, because it's "sappy."

Kinney was featured in the 1992 movie Singles, along with the other members of Alice in Chains performing the songs "It Ain't Like That" and "Would?"

== Other projects ==
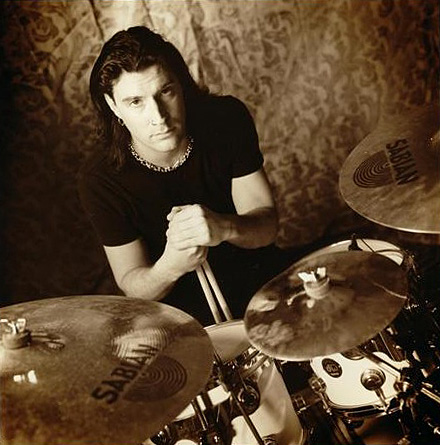
Kinney in 2002

In 1996, Kinney joined singer Johnny Cash, guitarist Kim Thayil of Soundgarden, and bassist Krist Novoselic of Nirvana for a cover of Willie Nelson's "Time of the Preacher", featured on the tribute album Twisted Willie, which also had Kinney playing drums for Jerry Cantrell's cover of "I've Seen All This World I Care to See". In the same year, Kinney played drums for Cantrell's first original solo song, "Leave Me Alone", featured on the soundtrack of the 1996 film The Cable Guy.

In 1998, Kinney played drums for Cantrell's first solo album, Boggy Depot, and percussion in the song "Tuesday's Gone", a cover of Lynyrd Skynyrd released on Metallica's 1998 album Garage Inc., also featuring Cantrell on guitar.

After they toured as part of Cantrell's solo band in 1998, Kinney and Queensrÿche guitarist Chris DeGarmo formed a new band called Spys4Darwin in 1999. Alice in Chains' bassist Mike Inez and Sponge lead vocalist Vin Dombroski joined the band soon after. The band released their first and only album on May 18, 2001, a 6-track EP entitled Microfish, and made their live debut at Endfest in Bremerton, Washington on August 4, 2001.

Since 2009, Kinney co-owns the club The Crocodile in Seattle along with Alice in Chains' manager Susan Silver, Capitol Hill Block Party co-founder Marcus Charles, Peggy Curtis, and Portugal. The Man guitarist Eric Howk. In 2013, Rolling Stone named The Crocodile as one of the best clubs in America, ranked at #7.

Soundgarden lead vocalist Chris Cornell personally asked Kinney to join him, Pearl Jam guitarist Mike McCready, Soundgarden drummer Matt Cameron, Screaming Trees drummer Barrett Martin and Guns N' Roses bassist Duff McKagan in the tribute show to the band Mad Season at Seattle's Benaroya Hall on January 30, 2015. Kinney played bongo for the song "All Alone" while a track with Layne Staley's original vocals were played. The performance was released as a live album in August 2015, entitled Mad Season / Seattle Symphony: Sonic Evolution / January 30, 2015 / Benaroya Hall.

From September 17 to 20, 2018, Kinney was a guest drummer on NBC's Late Night with Seth Meyers.

== Alice in Chains rebirth (2005–present) ==
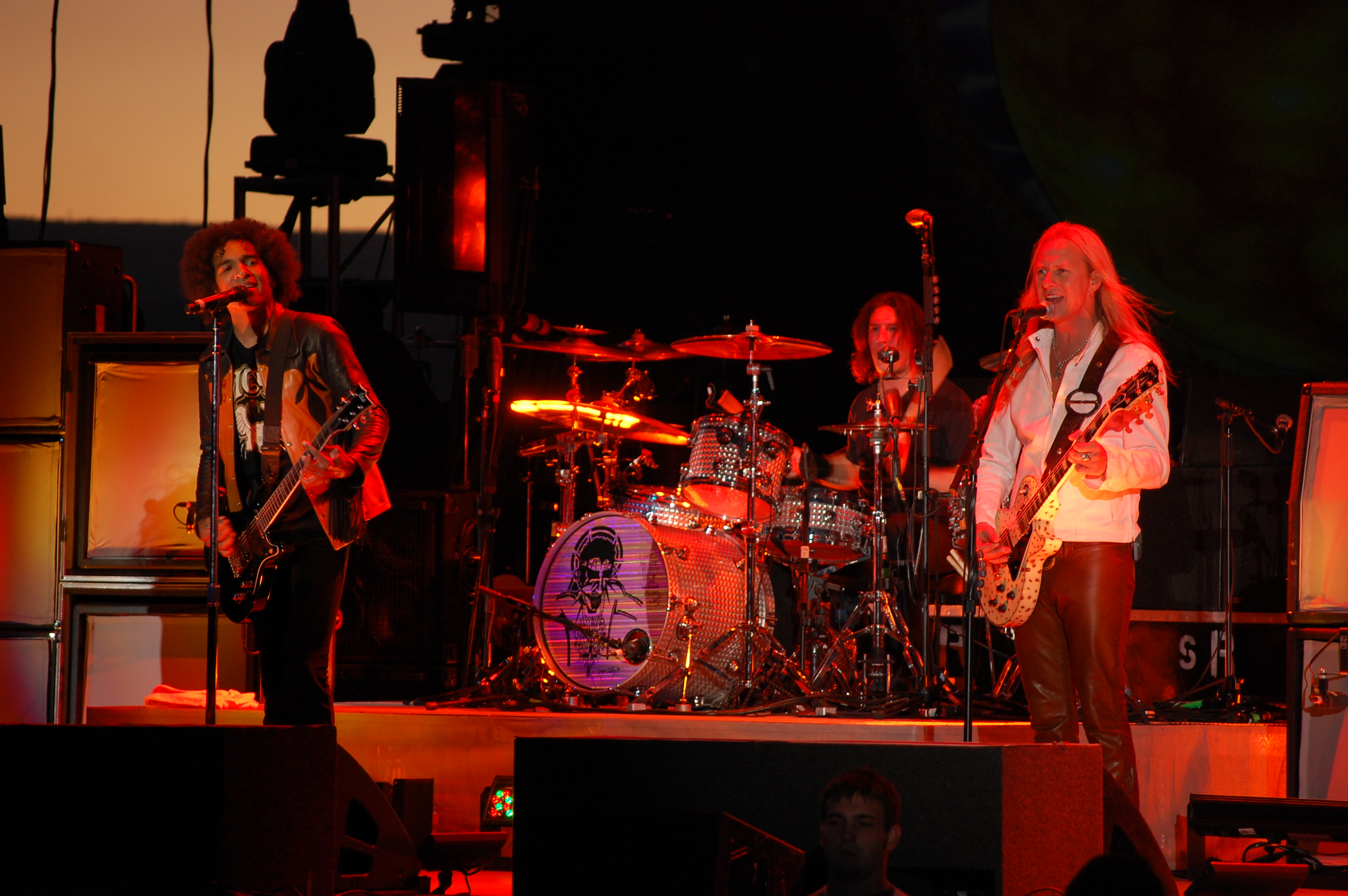
William DuVall (left), Kinney (back) and Jerry Cantrell (right) performing at an Alice in Chains concert in 2007.

Alice in Chains was inactive from 1996 onwards due to Layne Staley's drug issues, which resulted in his death in April 2002. In 2005, Kinney came up with the idea of reuniting with the other two surviving members of Alice in Chains, Jerry Cantrell and Mike Inez, to perform at a benefit concert for the victims of the tsunami disaster that struck South Asia in 2004. Kinney made calls to his former bandmates, as well as friends in the music community, such as former Alice in Chains manager Susan Silver. Kinney was surprised by the enthusiastic response to his idea, and the band performed for the first time in 10 years at the K-Rock Tsunami Continued Care Relief Concert in Seattle on February 18, 2006, featuring guest vocalists singing Staley's parts.

On March 6, 2006, the band performed together again at VH1's Decades Rock Live! concert, honoring fellow Seattle musicians Ann Wilson and Nancy Wilson of Heart. That night they played "Rooster" with Comes with the Fall vocalist William DuVall and Ann Wilson. DuVall joined Alice in Chains as lead singer shortly thereafter. The band has toured extensively worldwide since then.

The album Black Gives Way to Blue, the first without Staley, was released on September 29, 2009, featuring DuVall as the new vocalist. The album was totally funded by Kinney and Cantrell, as the band did not have a record label at the time. Their fifth studio album, The Devil Put Dinosaurs Here, was released on May 28, 2013.

In 2013, Kinney added the initials "LSMS" on his drum kit, a tribute to Alice in Chains' late members Layne Staley and Mike Starr.

Alice in Chains' sixth studio album (and the third with DuVall), Rainier Fog, was released on August 24, 2018.

In May 2025, Kinney suffered a "non-life-threatening medical emergency" prior to Alice in Chains' concert in Uncasville, Connecticut. As a result, the band canceled the remainder of its planned U.S. spring tour.

== Artwork ==
Kinney plays a large role in the presentation of the band, having helped design artwork, T-shirts and stage setups for most of the band's albums and tours.

In 1995, Alice in Chains was contemplating making a third studio album. When it was official, Kinney drew out artwork for the cover and liner notes. The cover features a three-legged dog, reason being, according to band lore, there was a three-legged dog named Tripod that used to terrorize Kinney and chase him around during his paperboy duties when he was a kid. The music video for the album's first single, "Grind", shows a three legged dog (similar to the one that allegedly used to chase Kinney) walking up a stairway with an elderly man.

The cover art of Black Gives Way to Blue (2009), an illustration of a heart surrounded by a black background, was Kinney's basic concept.

== Gear ==
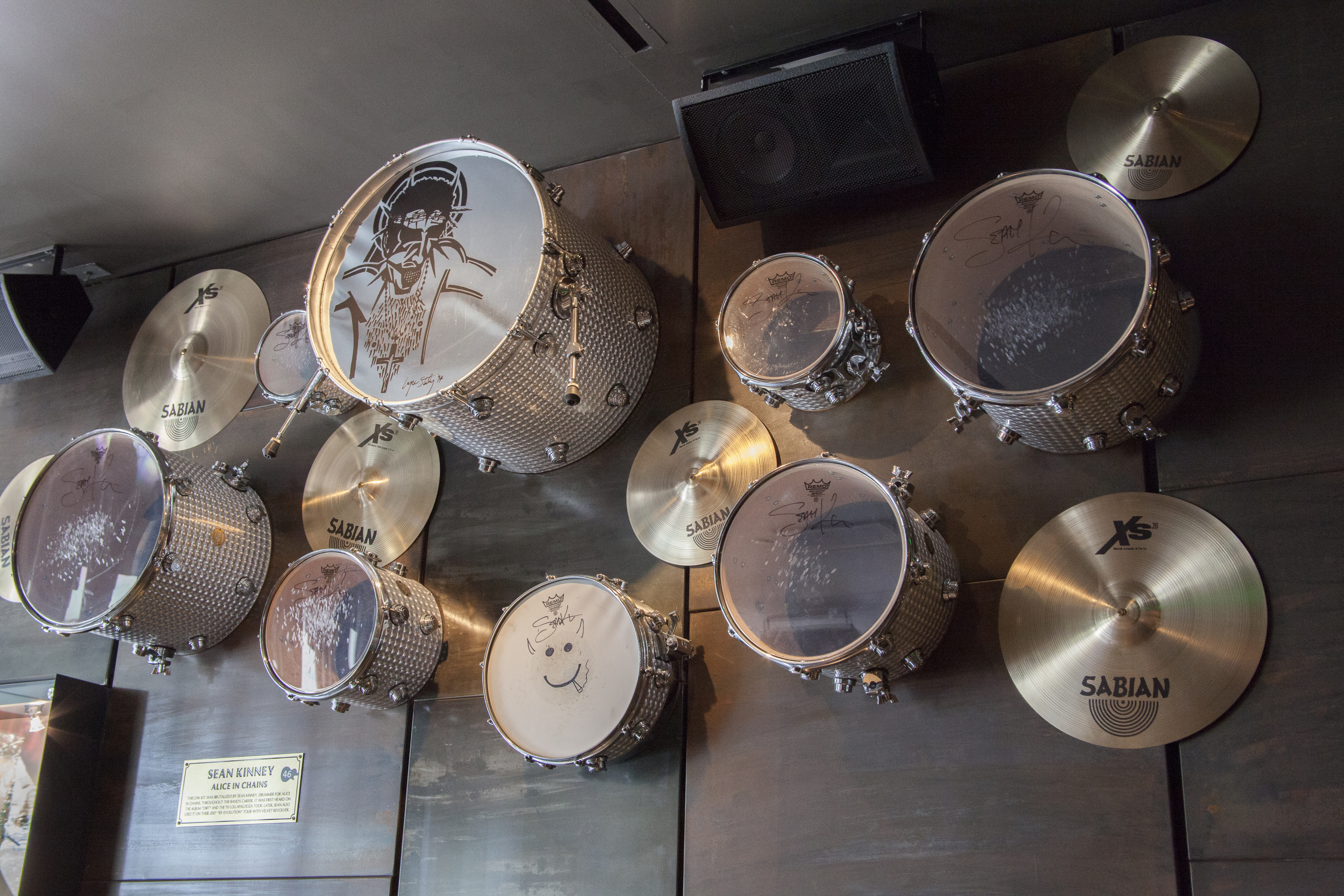
Sean Kinney drum set displayed at the Hard Rock Cafe in Seattle.

Kinney uses a drum kit made by Drum Workshop (DW Drums) with Remo heads and cymbals by Sabian. He uses Vater Percussion drumsticks.

== Discography ==
Alice in Chains

Other appearances

Title	Release	Label	Band
Boggy Depot	1998	Columbia	Jerry Cantrell
Microfish	2001	Pied Viper Records	Spys4Darwin

=== Guest appearances ===
Year	Song	Artist(s)	Album
1996	"Time of the Preacher"	Johnny Cash	Twisted Willie
1996	"I've Seen All This World I Care to See"	Jerry Cantrell	Twisted Willie
1996	"Leave Me Alone"	Jerry Cantrell	The Cable Guy (Original Motion Picture Soundtrack)
1998	"Tuesday's Gone"	Metallica	Garage Inc.
2015	"All Alone"	Mad Season	Mad Season / Seattle Symphony: Sonic Evolution / January 30, 2015 / Benaroya Hall
2016	"Tears"	Alice in Chains	Rush – 2112 (40th Anniversary Edition)

== Filmography ==
Year	Title	Role	Notes
1992	Singles	Himself	Cameo
1995	The Nona Tapes	Himself	Short film
2013	AIC 23	Stanley Eisen	Short film
