= Code Orange discography =

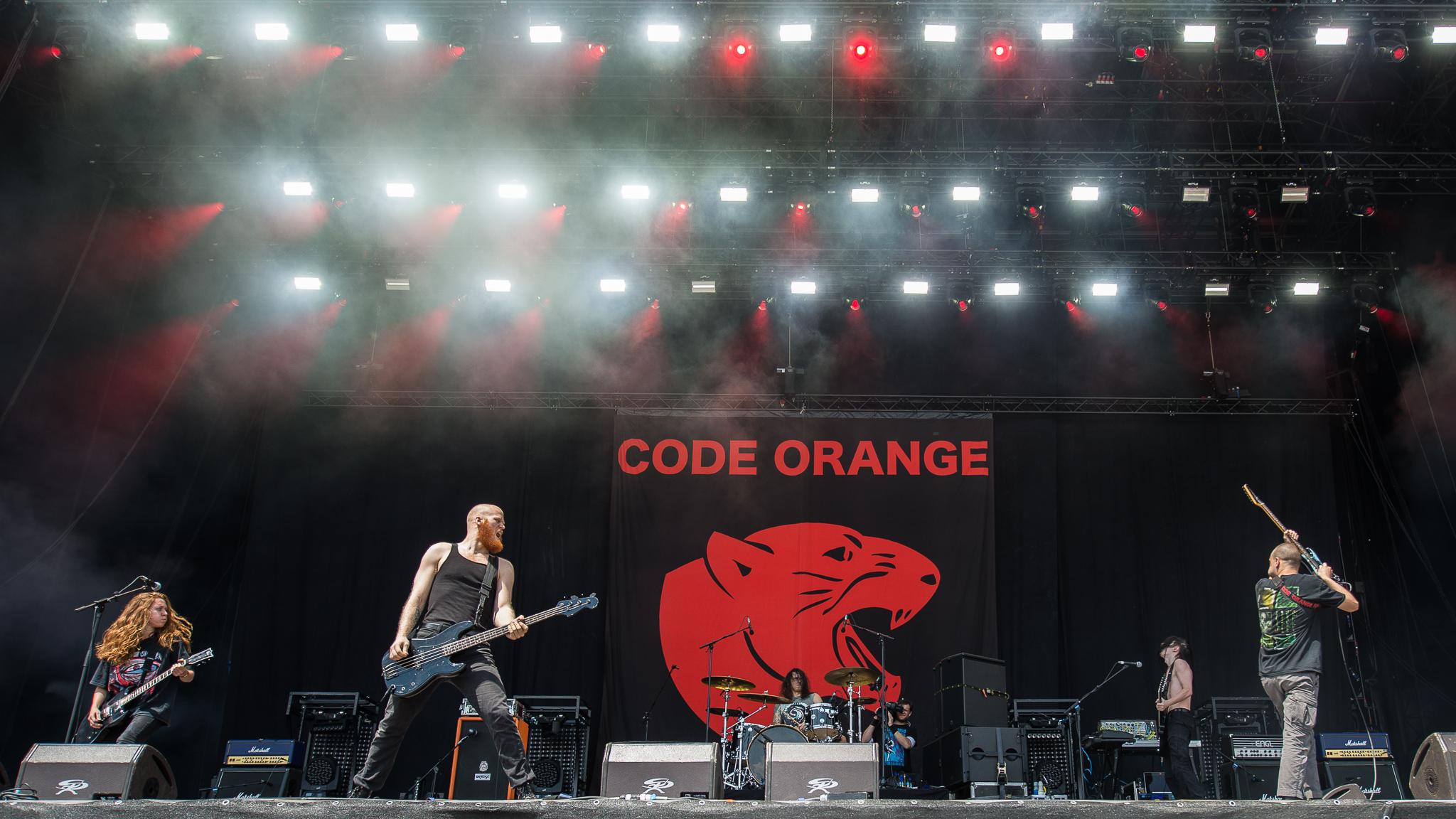
- Code Orange performing at Rock im Park in 2017
- Studio albums: 5
- EPs: 3
- Singles: 8
- Music videos: 15
- Other albums: 6
- Live albums: 1
- Remix albums: 1

American hardcore punk band Code Orange has released five studio albums, three EPs, eight singles, one live album, one remix album, six other albums, and fifteen music videos.

== Studio albums ==
List of studio albums, with selected chart positions
Title	Album details	Peak chart positions	
Title	Album details	US Tastemaker	US Hard Rock
Love Is Love/Return to Dust (as Code Orange Kids)	Released: November 20, 2012; Label: Deathwish; Formats: CD, digital download	—	—
I Am King	Released: September 2, 2014; Label: Deathwish; Formats: CD, LP, digital download	14	10
Forever	Released: January 13, 2017; Label: Roadrunner; Formats: CD, digital download	7	4
Underneath	Released: March 13, 2020; Label: Roadrunner; Formats: CD, digital download	2	6
The Above	Released: September 29, 2023; Label: Blue Grape; Formats: CD, digital download	—	—

== EPs ==
Title	Details
Embrace Me/Erase Me	Released: 2011; Label: Upper Hand Records; Format: CD, EP
Cycles	Released: 2011; Label: Mayfly; Format: CD, EP
The Hurt Will Go On	Released: June 21, 2018; Label: Roadrunner; Format: CD, EP, digital download

== Live albums ==
Title	Details
Under the Skin	Released: September 4, 2020; Label: Roadrunner; Format: NA

== Remix albums ==
Title	Details
What Is Really Underneath?	Released: February 17, 2023; Label: Blue Grape Music Roadrunner; Format: Digital

== Other releases ==
Title	Details
Code Orange Kids	Released: 2008; Label: Boat Records; Format: CD, EP
Winter Tour Demo	Released: 2009; Label: Boat Records; Format: CD, EP
Demo 2010	Released: 2010; Label: Upper Hand; Format: Cassette
Full of Hell / Code Orange Kids	Released: 2012; Label: Topshelf Records; Format: Vinyl, 7", LP, EP; Split with: Full Of Hell
Tigers Jaw / The World Is a Beautiful Place & I Am No Longer Afraid to Die / Code Orange Kids / Self Defense Family	Released: 2013; Label: Topshelf Records; Format: 7"; Split with: Tigers Jaw, The World Is a Beautiful Place & I Am No Longer Afraid to Die and Self Defense Family
Last Ones Left: In Fear of the End	Released: 2020; Label: Roadrunner Records; Format: DVD

== Singles ==
Title	Year	Peak chart positions	Album
Title	Year	US Main.	Album
"Forever"	2016	―	Forever
"Kill the Creator"	2016	―	Forever
"Bleeding in the Blur"	2017	―	Forever
"Only One Way"	2018	―	Non-album single
"Underneath"	2020	―	Underneath
"Swallowing the Rabbit Whole"	2020	—	Underneath
"Sulfur Surrounding"	2020	—	Underneath
"Out for Blood"	2021	38	Non-album single
"Grooming My Replacement"	2023	―	The Above
"The Game"	2023	—	The Above
"Take Shape" (feat. Billy Corgan)	2023	35	The Above
"Mirror"	2023	—	The Above
"Circle Through (Abstracted)"	2024	—	The Above

== Music videos ==
Title	Year	Director(s)
"V (My Body Is a Well)"	2012	Max Moore
"Flowermouth (The Leech)	2012	Max Moore
"I Am King"	2014	Max Moore
"Dreams in Inertia"	2014	Max Moore
"Forever"	2014	Max Moore
"Kill the Creator"	2014	Brandon Allen Bolmer
"Bleeding in the Blur"	2017	Max Moore
"The Mud"	2017	Dmitry Zarkharov & Eric Balderose
"Underneath"	2020	Max Moore
"Swallowing the Rabbit Whole"	2020	Max Moore
"Sulfur Surrounding"	2020	Eric Balderose
"Autumn And Carbine"	2021	Eric Balderose & Jami Morgan
"Out For Blood"	2021	Max Moore
"Take Shape"	2023	Max Moore & Jami Morgan
"Mirror"	2023	Jami Morgan, Eric "Shade" Balderose, and Eric Robbins
