= Dogleg (band) =

American post-hardcore band

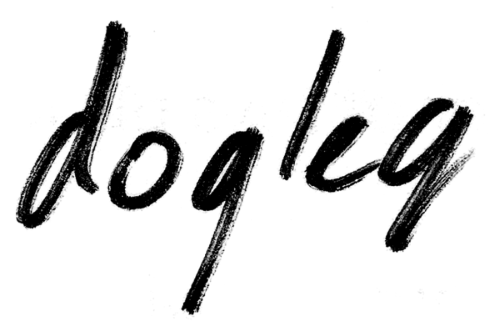
- Band logo

Background information
- Origin: Detroit, Michigan, U.S.
- Genres: Pop punk; post-hardcore; emo; indie rock
- Years active: 2015–2021 (hiatus)
- Label: Triple Crown
- Members: Alex Stoitsiadis; Chase Macinski; Parker Grissom; Jacob Hanlon
- Website: dogleg.band

Dogleg was an American post-hardcore band formed in Detroit, Michigan in 2015. They released their debut album, Melee in 2020 to critical acclaim. The band was fronted by Alex Stoitsiadis as lead vocalist and rhythm guitarist, with Chase Macinski on bass, Parker Grissom on guitar, and Jacob Hanlon on drums.

== History ==
Dogleg's origins begin in late 2015 when lead singer Alex Stoitsiadis started the project as a solo project. Stoitsiadis said of the formation that "[he] didn't really expect anything from it. I just wanted to write because there wasn't much creative freedom in my other bands I used to be in. I just felt like I couldn't write the songs I wanted to write, so I was like, I'm just going to sit down, write as many songs as I can before I don't have this space in my parents' basement anymore, record, and just put it out there and see what happens."

In 2016, Stoitsiadis moved from his hometown of Rochester Hills, Michigan to Ann Arbor to attend college at the University of Michigan. Stoitsiadis began working on and released the self-titled EP, Dogleg in 2016. The name of the EP and band is borrowed from "the greatest band to ever come from Michigan, Bear vs. Shark, and their song "Broken Dog Leg." In early 2016, Parker Grissom, who was still in high school joined Dogleg part time. Come summer 2016, Grissom joined the band full-time. The band began playing regular shows at Metal Frat, formerly Sigma Phi, a Michigan-based co-ed fraternity known for its basement shows. The same shows were where contemporaries such as Brave Bird, La Dispute, and Pity Sex began. Later that year with the new lineup, Dogleg recorded and released their second EP, Remember Alderaan?.

Throughout 2017, Dogleg began touring across Michigan, and in 2018, the band began playing shows across the Midwest, particularly in cities, such as Akron, Chicago, and Indianapolis. Later in 2018, the band represented Michigan at South by Southwest in Austin, Texas. In 2019, Dogleg signed with Triple Crown Records, which led to the band recording their first full-length album. On March 13, 2020, Dogleg released Melee, their debut album, which was met with critical acclaim.

In November 2021, the band announced they would embarking on North America tour in March/April 2022 supporting Touché Amoré and Vein.fm alongside Foxtails and Thirdface on select dates.

On November 15, 2021, the band announced they would be entering a hiatus amid allegations of possessive behavior in relationships towards frontman Alex Stoitsiadis.

== Discography ==
=== Studio albums ===
- Melee (2020)

=== Extended plays ===
- Dogleg (2016)
- Remember Alderaan? (2016)

=== Singles ===
- "Fox" (2019)
- "Kawasaki Backflip" (2020)
- "Ganon Main" (2020)
