= Dogleg =

Dogleg or dog-leg may refer to:

- Dogleg (band), an American indie rock band
- Dog-leg (stairs), a configuration of stairs which includes a half-landing before turning and continuing upwards
- Dog-leg gearbox, an unusual manual transmission layout
- Dogleg, a feature of a golf course
- Dogleg, or staggered junction, a type of road intersection
- Dogleg, a type of artifact in computer imaging, colloquially known as jaggies
- Dogleg, a guided, powered turn during ascent phase of a rocket launch
- Dogleg, a shape of an oval track with a recognizable kink

== See also ==
- Dog anatomy
- Canine terminology
