= Forever (Code Orange album) =

Studio album by Code Orange
- Released: January 13, 2017
- Genres: Metalcore; hardcore punk; sludge metal; industrial hardcore
- Length: 34:54
- Label: Roadrunner
- Producers: Kurt Ballou; Will Yip

Code Orange chronology
I Am King (2014)	Forever (2017)	Underneath (2020)

Singles from Forever
- 1. "Forever" Released: 2016; 2. "Kill the Creator" Released: 2016; 3. "Bleeding in the Blur" Released: 2017

Forever is the third studio album by the American hardcore punk band Code Orange and its first on a major label, Roadrunner Records, following a stint on the indie label Deathwish Inc. It was released on January 13, 2017.

== Promotion and marketing ==
Promotion for Forever began with the release of a music video directed by Max Moore for the title and opening track, "Forever", in October 2016. Presented entirely in black, white, and red like the album's cover art, the video for "Forever" rapidly cuts between scenes of Code Orange performing and other violent or abstract imagery, often with shaky camera footage. Of the video, Jami Morgan said, "I think the visuals match what we're about. It's definitely brutal and it's dark, but I think we have our own specific brand of it that includes a lot of dynamics of dark and a lot of shades of that." In December 2016, Code Orange released a digitally created "visualizer" for the track "Kill the Creator". Created by Brandon Allen Bolmer, the video shows a naked man in a chamber being tortured by a "hellish force that he created from all the wrong he has done". In the weeks leading up to the album's official release date, Code Orange also released online streams of the tracks "Bleeding in the Blur" and "Ugly" in January 2017.

Touring in support of Forever began with a January–February 2017 US tour with Youth Code, Gatecreeper, Nicole Dollanganger, Lifeless and Disgrace. The tour was noted for its wide variety of music genres among the bands on the bill. On the subject of the variety of bands, Morgan said, "I don't think it's something people are going to get to see every day. It's gonna be a very jarring experience. And our set's going to be a jarring experience. And the whole show is going to be a jarring experience, so that's what we're all about." The guitarist Eric Balderose collaborated with Drumcorps to create a mixtape under the name Shade, titled It's Almost Forever, that was played between sets and exclusively sold on cassette on the tour. A music video for the track "The Mud", directed by Balderose and Dmitry Zakharov, was premiered on Adult Swim's Toonami block on September 30, 2017.

== Music ==
Described as a metalcore, hardcore punk, sludge metal, industrial hardcore, and metallic hardcore album, Forever has influences from various styles in metal and hardcore, including industrial metal and nu metal. The album also employs "pitch-shifted vocal samples, glitched-out effects and dissonant layers of screeching noise". The track "Bleeding in the Blur" has alternative rock-influenced choruses, clean vocals and stoner metal riffage whereas "Hurt Goes On" attributes influences to Nine Inch Nails's musical output. According to Nicholas Senior of New Noise Magazine, "[the songs] "Bleeding in the Blur" and "Ugly" [push] their love of 90s shoegaze and grunge further."

== Critical reception ==
Professional ratings
Aggregate scores
Source	Rating
Metacritic	87/100
Review scores
Source	Rating
The A.V. Club	B
Exclaim!	9/10
Gigsoup	87%
Metal Hammer	4.5/5 stars
Metal Injection	8.5/10
MetalSucks	4/5 stars
New Noise Magazine	4.5/5 stars
Pitchfork	7.5/10
Punknews.org	3.5/5 stars
Rock Sound	8/10

At Metacritic, which assigns a normalized rating out of 100 to reviews from mainstream publications, the album received an average score of 87, which indicates "universal acclaim", based on six reviews.

The A.V. Club critic J.J. Anselmi wrote, "Despite its ridiculous lyrical moments, Forever advances the trend of mashing together disparate styles in metal and hardcore." Branan Ranjanathan of Exclaim! thought that "Code Orange have put together a record that few others in the genre would have the nerve to attempt making, and have found a number of ways to stay engaging across the set without losing any of their previous weight or momentum." Metal Injection's Michael Pementel noted the "great use of structure, heaviness, surprises, and pure energy from beginning to end in this album". According to Conor Scharr of Gigsoup, "[Code Orange]have uprooted themselves from genre tropes to build something entirely original."

Stephen Hill of Metal Hammer wrote that "this is resolutely hardcore punk, while remaining completely unique" and called it "a stone cold modern classic". Michael Pementel of Metal Injection stated, "It is not just simply that this is great heavy music, but effective heavy music." MetalSucks noted that "[the album's] playbook aligns with the band's last album...[and] also [has] a dream-like quality about it, a nightmarish hardcore fever."

Nicholas Senior of New Noise Magazine called the album "raw, angry, and unfiltered". Pitchfork critic Zoe Camp wrote that the band "offers up compelling, caustic, and occasionally even catchy evidence that they have earned their alpha-dog scene posturing". Jon of Punknews.org wrote that with this album, "Code Orange's returning reign of hardcore and sludge has finally been unveiled. On their new album, Forever Code Orange takes their themes one step further while keeping the music just as brutal as before."

=== Accolades ===
Year	Publication	Country	Accolade	Rank
2017	Loudwire	United States	"25 Best Metal Albums of 2017"	3
2017	Revolver	United States	"20 Best Albums of 2017"	1
2017	Rolling Stone	United States	"20 Best Metal Albums of 2017"	1
2017	Exclaim!	Canada	"Top 10 Metal and Hardcore Albums of 2017"	3
2017	Loudwire	United States	"Top 25 Metalcore albums of all-time"	25

== Track listing ==
All lyrics are written by Jami Morgan; all music is composed by Code Orange.

No.	Title	Length
1.	"Forever"	3:07
2.	"Kill the Creator"	2:26
3.	"Real"	3:07
4.	"Bleeding in the Blur"	4:04
5.	"The Mud"	4:10
6.	"The New Reality"	2:03
7.	"Spy"	3:22
8.	"Ugly"	3:09
9.	"No One Is Untouchable"	2:23
10.	"Hurt Goes On"	4:00
11.	"dream2"	3:03
Total length:		34:54

== Personnel ==
Code Orange

- Eric Balderose – guitars, vocals, synthesizer
- Reba Meyers – guitars, vocals
- Joe Goldman – bass guitar, vocals
- Jami Morgan – drums, lead vocals, art direction

Additional musicians

- Dominic Landolina – additional guitars
- Arthur Rizk – solo guitar on "Bleeding in the Blur"
- AJ Borish (Too Pure To Die) – additional vocals on "Real"
- Justin Ogden (Wrong Answer) – additional vocals on "Bleeding in the Blur"
- Jeremy Tingle (Lifeless) – additional vocals on "Kill the Creator" and "No One Is Untouchable"

Production

- Kurt Ballou – producer, engineer, mixing
- Will Yip – producer, engineer, mixing
- Vlado Meller – mastering
- Kimi Hanauer – artwork, layout, photography
- The Kliq – A&R
- Arthur Rizk – additional recording
- Matt Very – additional recording
- Robert Cheeseman – assistant engineer
- Jimmy Fontaine – band photography

== Charts ==
Chart (2017)	Peak position
UK Rock & Metal Albums (OCC)	12
US Top Album Sales (Billboard)	62
US Top Hard Rock Albums (Billboard)	4
US Top Rock Albums (Billboard)	15
US Indie Store Album Sales (Billboard)	7
US Vinyl Albums (Billboard)	12
