= Dark World (EP) =

EP by Pity Sex
- Released: 20 March 2012
- Length: 24:36
- Label: Forward

Pity Sex chronology
Dark World (2012)	Feast of Love (2013)

Professional ratings
Review scores
Source	Rating
Absolute Punk	84%
Alter the Press	5/5 stars

Dark World is the debut release from Ann Arbor, Michigan based indie rock band Pity Sex released in March 2012.

== Track listing ==
All music is composed by Pity Sex.

No.	Title	Length
1.	"When You're Around"	3:56
2.	"Dogwalk"	4:42
3.	"Hole Away"	3:18
4.	"Coca Cola"	3:39
5.	"Glue"	4:24
6.	"Flower Girl"	3:55
Total length:		24:36

== Personnel ==
Pity Sex

- Sean St. Charles - drums
- Brennan Greaves - guitar/vocals
- Britty Drake - guitar/vocals
- Brandan Pierce - bass
