= White Hot Moon =

Studio album by Pity Sex
- Released: 29 April 2016
- Recorded: February–March 2015
- Genres: Shoegaze, emo
- Length: 39:35
- Label: Run for Cover
- Producer: Will Yip

Pity Sex chronology
Adventures/Pity Sex (2014)	White Hot Moon (2016)

Professional ratings
Aggregate scores
Source	Rating
Metacritic	72/100
Review scores
Source	Rating
AllMusic	4/5 stars
American Songwriter	4/5 stars
Alternative Press	7/10 stars
Clash	6/10 stars
Consequence of Sound	B
DIY	3/5 stars
Exclaim!	8/10 stars
Pitchfork	(6.5/10)
Punknews.org	3.5/5 stars
Rolling Stone	3/5 stars
Rock Sound	8/10 stars
Spin	6/10 stars

White Hot Moon is the second studio album by American shoegaze band, Pity Sex. The album was released through Run for Cover on April 29, 2016.

== Track listing ==
No.	Title	Length
1.	"A Satisfactory World for Reasonable People"	2:32
2.	"Burden You"	3:44
3.	"Bonhomie"	2:59
4.	"September"	4:19
5.	"What Might Soothe You?"	3:07
6.	"Plum"	2:44
7.	"Nothing Rips Through Me"	3:14
8.	"Orange and Red"	3:32
9.	"Dandelion"	2:03
10.	"White Hot Moon"	3:17
11.	"Pin a Star"	2:41
12.	"Wappen Beggars"	5:23

== Chart positions ==
Chart (2014)	Peak position
US Top Alternative Albums (Billboard)	21
US Heatseekers Albums (Billboard)	5
US Independent Albums (Billboard)	24
US Vinyl Albums (Billboard)	5

== Personnel ==
=== Pity Sex ===
- Sean St. Charles – drums
- Brennan Greaves – guitar, vocals, artwork, photography, layout
- Brandan Pierce – bass
- Britty Drake – guitar, vocals

=== Technical ===
- Will Yip - auxiliary percussion, mixing & recording engineer
- Ryan Smith - mastering engineer
