= Love Is Love/Return to Dust =

Love Is Love // Return to Dust

Studio album by Code Orange Kids
- Released: November 20, 2012
- Genre: Hardcore punk; metalcore; post-hardcore
- Length: 27:07
- Label: Deathwish
- Producer: Kurt Ballou

Code Orange Kids chronology
Full of Hell / Code Orange Kids (2012)	Love Is Love // Return to Dust (2012)	I Am King (2014)

Love Is Love // Return to Dust is the debut album by the American hardcore punk band Code Orange Kids. The album was released on November 20, 2012 through Deathwish Inc. A music video for the song "Flowermouth (The Leech)" was released in October 2012.

The first pressing of the album, limited to 3,000 copies, sold out within the first few weeks of release.

== Critical reception ==
Professional ratings
Review scores
Source	Rating
AbsolutePunk	90%
Consequence of Sound	B

According to AbsolutePunk's Adam Pfleider, the record "tetters the line of sheer terror and savant variation in the context of the larger scale of contemporary hardcore - however you may define it." David Von Bader of Consequence of Sound wrote: "If the album is a sign of things to come, Deathwish has yet again located and presented the best in artistically relevant heavy music."

Love Is Love/Return to Dust ranked at number 23 on AbsolutePunk's top 30 albums of 2012 list, at number 2 on The A.V. Club's metal column Loud's "best metal, punk, and hardcore of 2012" list and also appeared on The Boston Phoenix's list of top metal albums of 2012.

== Track listing ==
No.	Title	Length
1.	"Flowermouth (The Leech)"	2:25
2.	"Around My Neck // On My Head"	1:07
3.	"Sleep (I've Been Slipping)"	1:29
4.	"Liars // Trudge"	3:55
5.	"Colors (Into Nothing)"	3:18
6.	"Nothing (The Rat)"	2:49
7.	"Roots Are Certain // Sky Is Empty"	0:49
8.	"Choices (Love Is Love)"	3:13
9.	"Calm // Breathe"	2:41
10.	"Bloom (Return to Dust)"	5:21
Total length:		27:07

== Personnel ==
Love Is Love // Return to Dust personnel according to CD liner notes.

Code Orange Kids

- Eric Balderose – guitar, vocals
- Joe Goldman – bass, vocals
- Reba Meyers – guitar, vocals
- Jami Morgan – drums, vocals

Guest musicians

- Adam McIlwee (Tigers Jaw & Wicca Phase Springs Eternal) – vocals on "Colors (Into Nothing)"
- Mike McKenzie (The Red Chord) – vocals on "Bloom (Return to Dust)"

Production

- Kurt Ballou – recording, mixing, engineering
- Carl Saff – mastering

Artwork and design

- Katie Krulock – photography
- Kimi Hanauer – artwork, photography
