= The Above =

Studio album by Code Orange
- Released: September 29, 2023
- Studio: Electrical Audio
- Genres: Nu metal; metalcore; alternative rock; grunge; industrial rock; hard rock
- Length: 51:36
- Label: Blue Grape Music
- Producers: Jami Morgan; Eric "Shade" Balderose

Code Orange chronology
| Under the Skin (2020) | The Above (2023) |

Singles from The Above
- 1. "Grooming My Replacement" / "The Game" Released: June 1, 2023; 2. "Take Shape" Released: July 19, 2023; 3. "Mirror" Released: September 6, 2023

The Above is the fifth studio album by American metalcore band Code Orange, released on September 29, 2023, through Blue Grape Music. It is their first album to be entirely self-produced, their first with the label Blue Grape Music, and their first to feature drummer Max Portnoy. It was preceded by three singles: "Grooming My Replacement"/"The Game", "Take Shape", and "Mirror".

== Recording ==
The Above was self-produced by band members Jami Morgan and Eric "Shade" Balderose, and engineered by Steve Albini at Electrical Audio.

== Release and promotion ==
On May 30, 2023, the band shared a video on their YouTube channel entitled "Code Orange SLAMS modern music critics", with the thumbnail featuring critics such as Anthony Fantano (wearing a Code Orange shirt) and Finn McKenty. However, the video served as a bait-and-switch: It instead featured several minutes of a staged torture sequence before a new song played at the end. The day after the video, on June 1, 2023, the band released two new songs: "Grooming My Replacement", which played in the video, and "The Game". On July 18, 2023, the band released the single "Take Shape" featuring Billy Corgan. On the same day, the band announced the title, The Above, and that it is set to be released on September 29, 2023. On September 6, 2023, the band released the next single, "Mirror".

== Composition ==
The Above has been described as nu metal, metalcore, alternative rock, grunge, industrial rock, hard rock, and groove metal. According to a press release, "[the album] draws on grunge, trip-hop and hip-hop while still being as heavy as Code Orange ever have been." According to Morgan, "We wanted the album to be able to wash over you with melody, aggression, and joy, but it was of equal importance that the closer you look, the more you are rewarded. It was to feel rooted in the 'analogue' world, but with threads of digital reality binding things together. We wanted the sound and even the recording process itself to reflect that edict, so we enlisted Steve Albini at Electrical Audio to get the most real and raw version of the band possible, even recording us all at once in a room together for the first time in our career."

== Critical reception ==
Professional ratings
Aggregate scores
| Source | Rating |
|---|---|
| Metacritic | 77/100 |
Review scores
| Source | Rating |
| Kerrang! | 5/5 |
| Metal Hammer | 4.5/5 stars |
| MetalSucks | 4.5/5 stars |
| NME | 3/5 stars |
| PopMatters | 8/10 |
| Sputnikmusic | 2.5/5 |
| Wall of Sound | 9.5/10 |

The Above was met with generally positive reviews. At Metacritic, which assigns a normalized rating out of 100 to reviews from mainstream publications, the album received an average score of 77 based on 4 reviews. Nick Ruskell of Kerrang! stated, "The Above is an album that frequently goes the opposite way than you'd expect...they've made such a huge range of stuff work together so well...none of this feels like a loss to what Code Orange once were." Dave Everley of Metal Hammer felt that the "[band's] willingness to move forward and break down genre boundaries...[makes] The Above is everything modern heavy music should be but all too often isn't. If this is selling out, more bands should try it." Max Heilman of MetalSucks was positive about the band's incorporation of different genres stating, "[it transcends] anything gimmicky, as every beat switch, every dynamic shift and every production choice is as calculated as it is unorthodox."

Rishi Shah of NME felt that the album's last couple of songs weren't as strong as the first couple stating, "clocking in at 14 songs, one wonders if the ferocity of 'Grooming My Replacement' could have completed a memorable ten-track collection, with the final few tracks lacking that consistent cutting edge." Ethan Stewart of PopMatters praised the album's "genre-fluidity and accessibility" and "while at times being as heavy as any of their old material, portrays much of what makes the genre so thriving even outside the mainstream eye." Nick Ruskell of Sputnikmusic complemented the album's production and pacing but went on to state, "given the evident potential showcased on Underneath...that metalcore + industrial + bleakness ting - may have borne more fruit than the brighter///broader whole here, particularly if their goal is truly as stated: to achieve something genuinely new and filthy in the knotty metallic underground. The Above is many things, but it just isn't that. Wall of Sound compared the album to other albums that were considered changes in sound. "It's quite possible fans will embrace The Above as their favourite album, such is its point of difference to their past work, in the same way there's NIN fans who prefer The Fragile to The Downward Spiral, Slipknot fans who take The Subliminal Verses over Iowa and Nirvana fans who prefer In Utero."

== Track listing ==
All tracks are written by Code Orange, except "Take Shape", written by Code Orange and William Patrick Corgan.

The Above track listing
| No. | Title | Length |
|---|---|---|
| 1. | "Never Far Apart" | 3:53 |
| 2. | "Theatre of Cruelty" | 3:58 |
| 3. | "Take Shape" (featuring Billy Corgan) | 3:24 |
| 4. | "The Mask of Sanity Slips" | 5:08 |
| 5. | "Mirror" | 3:59 |
| 6. | "A Drone Opting Out of the Hive" | 3:21 |
| 7. | "I Fly" | 3:41 |
| 8. | "Splinter the Soul" | 3:49 |
| 9. | "The Game" | 2:59 |
| 10. | "Grooming My Replacement" | 2:54 |
| 11. | "Snapshot" | 3:29 |
| 12. | "Circle Through" | 2:58 |
| 13. | "But a Dream..." | 3:45 |
| 14. | "The Above" | 4:18 |
| Total length: | | 51:36 |

== Personnel ==
Code Orange

- Jami Morgan – vocals
- Eric "Shade" Balderose – guitars, vocals, keyboards, programming
- Reba Meyers – guitars, vocals
- Joe Goldman – bass
- Dominic Landolina – guitars, vocals
- Max Portnoy – drums

Additional

- Eric "Shade" Balderose – production
- Jami Morgan – production
- Steve Albini – engineering
- Billy Corgan – additional vocals on "Take Shape"
- Brian Riordan – string arrangements
- Nick Rowe – string engineering and recording
- Judith Meyers – violin
- Abbey Hartman – viola
- Christina Chen – cello
- Paul Thompson – bass
- Marcelle Pierson – harp
- Alejandro Aranda – piano

== Charts ==
Chart performance for The Above
| Chart (2023) | Peak position |
|---|---|
| Scottish Albums (Official Charts) | 79 |
| UK Album Downloads (Official Charts) | 33 |
| UK Independent Albums (Official Charts) | 27 |
| UK Rock & Metal Albums (Official Charts) | 7 |
