= Down in a Hole =

1993 single by Alice in Chains

Single by Alice in Chains

from the album Dirt
- Released: September 14, 1993
- Recorded: 1992
- Genre: Grunge
- Length: 5:38
- Label: Columbia
- Songwriter: Jerry Cantrell
- Producers: Alice in Chains; Dave Jerden

Alice in Chains singles chronology
"What the Hell Have I" (1993)	"Down in a Hole" (1993)	"No Excuses" (1994)

Music video
- "Down in a Hole" on YouTube

"Down in a Hole" is a song by the American rock band Alice in Chains, from their second studio album, Dirt (1992). Columbia Records serviced the song to US radio on September 14, 1993, making it the album's fifth single. It is the twelfth song on most pressings of the album and fourth or eleventh on others. A power ballad, the song was written by guitarist and vocalist Jerry Cantrell for his then-girlfriend, Courtney Clarke. The single spent 21 weeks on Billboard's Album Rock Tracks chart and peaked at No. 10. The song was included on the band's greatest hits album, Nothing Safe: Best of the Box (1999), as well as on their box set, Music Bank (1999). An acoustic version performed on Alice in Chains' MTV Unplugged in 1996 was released in a live album and DVD.

== Origin and recording ==
Songwriter and guitarist Jerry Cantrell was at first hesitant to present the song to the band, feeling that the song was too soft, but after a positive response from the band, they followed through and recorded it. The composition is written in A♭ minor, utilizing Dorian mode, and is centered mainly around A♭ minor - G♭ major - D♭ major chord progression, with Layne Staley's and Jerry Cantrell's vocal parts intricately harmonizing.

== Lyrics ==
Jerry Cantrell wrote the song for his then-girlfriend, Courtney Clarke. In the liner notes of 1999's Music Bank box set collection, Cantrell said of the song:

["Down in a Hole"]'s in my top three, personally. It's to my long-time love. It's the reality of my life, the path I've chosen and in a weird way it kind of foretold where we are right now. It's hard for us to both understand...that this life is not conducive to much success with long-term relationships.

== Release and reception ==
Columbia Records serviced "Down in a Hole" to US radio on September 14, 1993. It peaked at No. 10 on Billboard's Album Rock Tracks chart. The single reached the top 40 in the UK and the top 30 in Ireland.

Ned Raggett of AllMusic said that "Staley's...half-strangled but still amazingly evocative performance...is heartfelt and almost yearning" and that "the end result feels like a ruined man looking for some sort of comfort." Stereogum said of the song; "Down in a Hole" is an anthem of loss, revulsion, and depression. But it really is an anthem first and foremost. The verses build slowly to a soaring chorus with an irrepressible melody. Staley's pained howl guides the song, but its power derives from Cantrell's terrific harmonies, which give the piece heft and also a sense of unease." In 2014, Loudwire ranked the song at No. 8 on their list of the 10 greatest Alice in Chains songs, and in 2021, Kerrang ranked the song at No. 3 on their list of the 20 greatest Alice in Chains songs.

== Music video ==
The music video was recorded on August 9, 1993 in the Johannesburg settlement, California. It was directed by Nigel Dick, photographed by Paul Taylor (the band also shot their own footage), edited by Eric Santacroce, and produced by David Diehl. The storyline shows the band members walking through a desert landscape. The video premiered in September 1993. Dick recalled that every moment of the session was "a nightmare", and his only happy memory from the recording period was "a 1964 Gibson acoustic guitar that I bought in a pawn shop in Kansas City, waiting for their [the band's] first recording rehearsal – which was subsequently canceled."

The music video is available on Alice in Chains' official website.

== Live performances ==
Despite being a single, the song was never played live until the band was recorded for MTV Unplugged in 1996; it appeared on the Unplugged live album and home video release.

Another acoustic live version of the song, featuring William DuVall on lead vocals, was included on the Japanese version of Black Gives Way to Blue (2009) as a bonus track.

== Cover versions ==
The song was covered by professional baseball player Bronson Arroyo on his 2005 album, Covering the Bases, which lists the song as "Down in the Hole".

On his low-key 2007 tour—in support of his album Easy Tiger, Ryan Adams covered the song live with his band, The Cardinals. A cover of the song is also featured on Adams' 2007 EP, Follow the Lights.

The Vitamin String Quartet recorded an instrumental version of the song for their 2009 album, The String Quartet Tribute to Alice in Chains.

The Christian metal band Demon Hunter performed an acoustic version of the song on the deluxe edition of their 2011 album, The World Is a Thorn.

Swedish metal band In Flames covered the song on their covers EP, Down, Wicked & No Good, released in November 2017.

In 2020, American metalcore band Code Orange covered the song on their live album, Under the Skin.

== Track listings ==
CD single (659751–2)

1. "Down in a Hole" (radio edit) – 3:53
2. "Down in a Hole" – 5:40
3. "What the Hell Have I" – 4:00
4. "Rooster" – 6:15

12-inch single (659751–6) Side 1

1. "Down in a Hole"
2. "A Little Bitter"

Side 2

1. "Rooster"
2. "Love, Hate, Love"

7-inch single (659751–7) Side 1

1. "Down in a Hole" (radio edit)

Side 2

1. "Rooster"

== Personnel ==
- Layne Staley – vocals
- Jerry Cantrell – vocals, electric and acoustic guitar
- Mike Starr – bass
- Sean Kinney – drums

== Charts ==
Chart (1993)	Peak position
Ireland (IRMA)	29
UK Singles (Official Charts)	36
US Mainstream Rock (Billboard)	10

== Certifications ==
Region	Certification	Certified units/sales
New Zealand (RMNZ)	Platinum	30,000^{‡}
United States (RIAA)	Platinum	1,000,000^{‡}
^{‡} Sales+streaming figures based on certification alone.

== Release history ==
Release dates and formats for "Down in a Hole"
Region	Date	Format(s)	Label(s)	Ref.
United States	September 14, 1993	Radio	Columbia	
United Kingdom	October 11, 1993	7-inch vinyl; 12-inch vinyl; CD	Columbia	
