= Melee (Dogleg album) =

Studio album by Dogleg
- Released: March 13, 2020
- Studios: Alex Stoitsiadis's House; Rochester, Michigan
- Genres: Emo; melodic hardcore; post-hardcore; hardcore punk
- Length: 35:40
- Label: Triple Crown
- Producer: Alex Stoitsiadis

Dogleg chronology
Remember Alderaan? (2016)	Melee (2020)

Singles from Melee
- 1. "Fox" Released: November 11, 2019; 2. "Kawasaki Backflip" Released: February 7, 2020; 3. "Wartortle" Released: April 17, 2020

Melee is the only studio album by American post-hardcore band, Dogleg. The album was released on March 13, 2020 through Triple Crown Records.

Two singles were released prior to the album's release: "Fox" in late 2019, and "Kawasaki Backflip" in early 2020. The album was met with critical acclaim, with critics praising the album's ambitious sound, energy, and cultural relevance.

== Background ==
Following the release of their last extended play, Remember Alderaan?, Dogleg began extensively touring across their home state of Michigan and across the American Midwest in promotion of their first two EPs. The success and local popularity of the band caught the attention of South by Southwest, who recruited the band to perform at 2018 SXSW. Subsequently, the band signed in 2019, with Triple Crown Records, and began working on a full-length studio album in the summer and fall of 2019. Recording was undertaken at lead singer, Alex Stoitsiadis's, home in Rochester, Michigan.

The album was formally announced on February 7, 2020 with their second single, "Kawasaki Backflip".

== Release and promotion ==
The album was released during the onset of lockdowns associated with the COVID-19 pandemic. The tour was postponed by 18 months with the first show to be on September 10, 2021 and the final show by on November 14, 2021.

== Critical reception ==
Professional ratings
Aggregate scores
Source	Rating
Metacritic	84/100
Review scores
Source	Rating
Exclaim!	8/10
New Noise	5/5 stars
Paste	7.5/10
Pitchfork	8.6/10
Punknews.org	4/5 stars
Sputnikmusic	3.7/5

Melee was critically acclaimed by contemporary music critics upon release. On review aggregator website, Album of the Year, Melee has an average score of 80 out of 100 based on three critics.

Konstantina Buhalis, writing for New Noise magazine gave the album a perfect score of five stars out of five. Buhalis felt that "Dogleg’s impressive ability to craft gut-wrenching punk is only one of their talents, as this record proves. Beyond their poignant lyricism is their technical expertise, taking traditional, Midwest emo and elevating it."

Ian Cohen, writing for Pitchfork praised the album, giving it the "Best New Music" designation. Cohen said that "the thrilling debut from the Detroit rock band burns hot and bright. It’s a record that’s as melodic as it is physical, where pent-up aggression turns into physical liberation." Cohen stated that "Melee effectively advocates for a binary of taste: There is rock music that slaps and rock music that does not, the latter of which should not be given any attention."

=== Accolades ===
Accolades for Melee
Publication	Accolade	Rank	Ref.
Pitchfork	The 50 Best Albums of 2020	34	
Pitchfork	The 35 Best Rock Albums of 2020	—	
Spin	Spin's 30 Best Albums of 2020 – Mid-Year	N/A	

== Track listing ==
All lyrics are written by Alex Stoitsiadis; all music is composed by Alex Stoitsiadis, Chase Macinski, and Parker Grissom.

Melee track listing
No.	Title	Length
1.	"Kawasaki Backflip"	2:24
2.	"Bueno"	2:56
3.	"Prom Hell"	4:21
4.	"Fox"	2:50
5.	"Headfirst"	3:44
6.	"Hotlines"	3:21
7.	"Wartortle"	2:57
8.	"Wrist"	3:06
9.	"Cannonball"	3:40
10.	"Ender"	6:21
Total length:		35:40
