= Adventures / Pity Sex =

EP by Adventures and Pity Sex
- Released: 7 October 2014
- Genre: Emo; indie rock; alternative rock
- Label: Run for Cover

Adventures chronology
Adventures / Run, Forever (2014)	Adventures / Pity Sex (2014)	Supersonic Home (2015)

Pity Sex chronology
Feast of Love (2013)	Adventures / Pity Sex (2014)	White Hot Moon (2016)

Adventures / Pity Sex is a split EP between the American rock bands Adventures and Pity Sex, released on October 7, 2014, through Run for Cover Records. It features one original track and one cover by each band.

== Track listing ==
No.	Title	Written by	Length
1.	"Flowing Through" (Adventures)	Adventures	3:14
2.	"Behind This Wall" (Adventures)	Turning Point	4:31
3.	"Acid Reflex" (Pity Sex)	Pity Sex	2:20
4.	"Gigantic" (Pity Sex)	Pixies	4:21
Total length:			13:12

== Personnel ==
Adventures

- Dominic Landolina – guitar
- Jami Morgan – drums
- Joe Goldman – vocals, bass
- Kimi Hanauer – keyboard
- Reba Meyers – vocals, guitar

Pity Sex

- Sean St. Charles – drums
- Brennan Greaves – guitar, vocals
- Brandan Pierce – bass
- Britty Drake – guitar, vocals
