= Feast of Love (album) =

Studio album by Pity Sex
- Released: 25 June 2013
- Genres: Shoegaze, slacker rock
- Length: 27:50
- Label: Run for Cover
- Producer: Will Yip

Pity Sex chronology
| Dark World (2012) | Feast of Love (2013) | Adventures/Pity Sex (2014) |

Professional ratings
Review scores
| Source | Rating |
|---|---|
| The 405 | 7/10 stars |
| Absolute Punk | 80% |
| AllMusic | 4/5 stars |
| Alternative Press | 3.5/5 stars |
| Pitchfork Media | 7/10 stars |
| Punknews.org | 4/5 stars |
| Sputnikmusic | 3/5 stars |

Feast of Love is a studio album from Ann Arbor, Michigan based indie rock band Pity Sex released in June 2013.

== Track listing ==
All music is composed by Pity Sex.

| No. | Title | Length |
|---|---|---|
| 1. | "Wind-Up" | 2:54 |
| 2. | "Keep" | 4:06 |
| 3. | "Drown Me Out" | 3:17 |
| 4. | "Smoke Screen" | 2:49 |
| 5. | "Hollow Body" | 1:50 |
| 6. | "Sedated" | 2:55 |
| 7. | "Honey Pot" | 2:17 |
| 8. | "Drawstring" | 1:28 |
| 9. | "St. John's Wort" | 2:56 |
| 10. | "Fold" | 3:23 |
| Total length: | | 27:50 |

== Personnel ==
Pity Sex

- Sean St. Charles - drums
- Brennan Greaves - guitar/vocals
- Britty Drake - guitar/vocals
- Brandan Pierce - bass
