= Pity Sex =

American alternative rock band

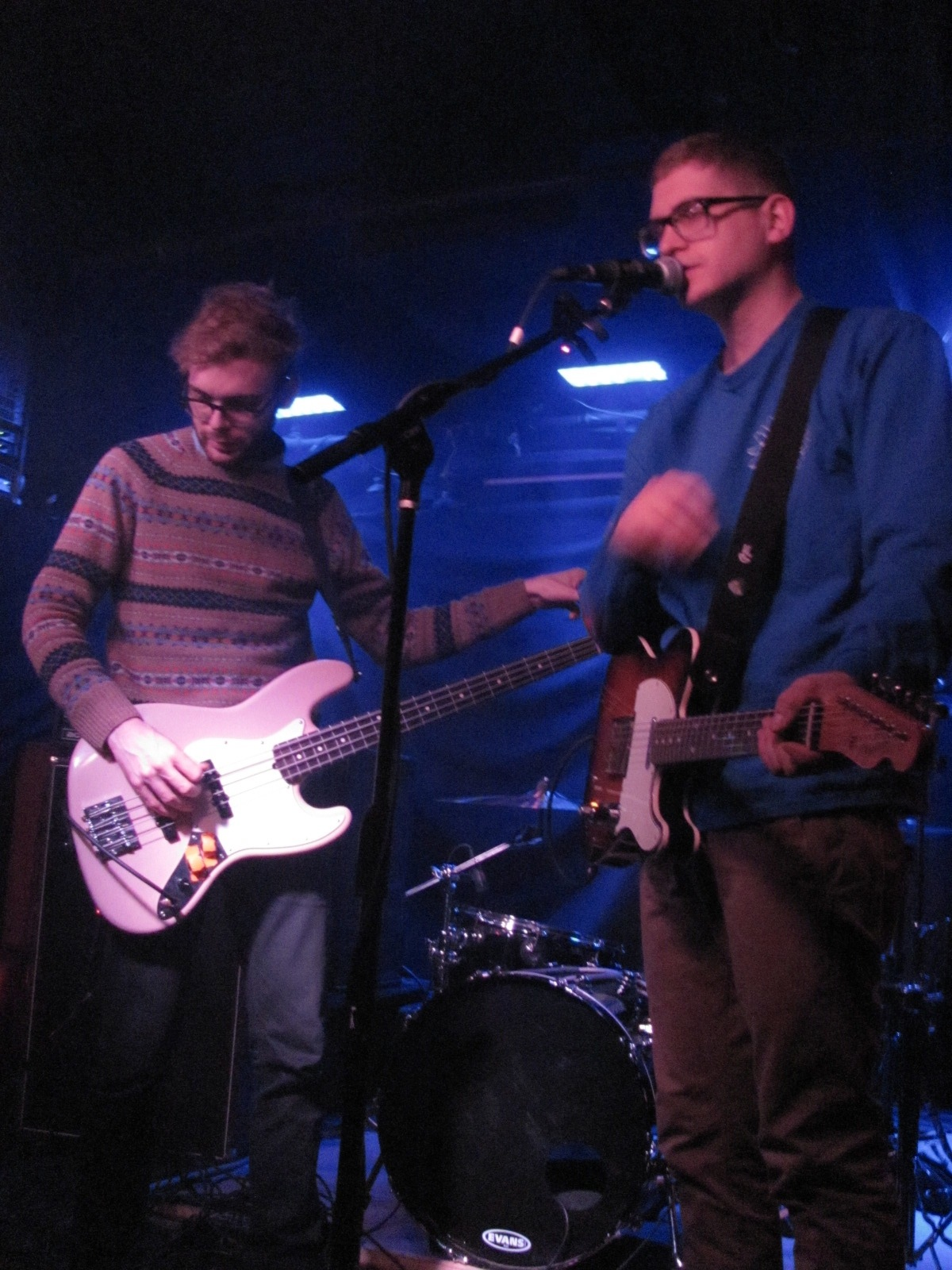

Background information
- Origin: Ann Arbor, Michigan
- Genres: Indie rock; alternative rock; shoegaze; dream pop
- Years active: 2011–2016, 2022, 2024–present
- Labels: Forward, Run for Cover
- Members: Brennan Greaves; Britty Drake; Michael Cesario; Sean St. Charles
- Past members: Derrick Daniel; Brandan Pierce; Michael Politowicz; Anthony Heubel

Pity Sex is an American alternative rock band from Ann Arbor, Michigan. The band formed in 2011, and released two studio albums – Feast of Love (2013) and White Hot Moon (2016) – prior to their split. The band announced its reunion in 2022, as part of the Sound & Fury festival line-up.

== History ==
=== Formation, split demo, and debut EP (2011–2012) ===
Having formed and recorded a demo in 2011, eventually releasing it as a split cassette with Brave Bird. Pity Sex would go on to release their debut EP, Dark World a year later on Forward Records to positive reviews.

=== Feast of Love (2012–2015) ===
In 2013 the band released their debut album, Feast of Love, on Run For Cover Records. Following the band's signing to Run For Cover Records the Dark World EP would also be re-released through Run For Cover Records. In 2014, they toured with labelmates Adventures, Basement and Tigers Jaw, among others. In September of that year, the band also toured Australia for the first time. In October 2014, the band released a split EP with Adventures, with each band's side featuring one original song and one cover. Pity Sex chose to cover the Pixies' "Gigantic". Guitarist Brennan Greaves helped to create the artwork, in collaboration with Kimi Hanauer of Adventures. In the summer of 2015, the band completed a US tour with punk rock band Ceremony. It was around this time that recording for their next album would be completed.

=== White Hot Moon (2015–2016) ===
On September 28, 2015, the band released a new digital single, entitled "What Might Soothe You?", through NPR. The single was released alongside a statement announcing the impending release of their new album White Hot Moon. The album was released in the spring of 2016, and was preceded by a vinyl edition of "What Might Soothe You?".

In August 2016, it was announced that vocalist/guitarist Britty Drake was to leave the band after a final show supporting Best Coast as to no longer "hold them back from touring" as she focused on her doctoral studies and non-musical career. The band completed their remaining tour dates in Japan and Australia with Greaves taking on full lead vocal duties and Anthony Heubel joining the band on lead guitar. Following the conclusion of their tour, the band announced an indefinite hiatus in October 2016. The band released their final single and video, "Burden You," created by Playlab, in conjunction with the announcement as a parting gift of sorts.

=== Other projects and reunions (2016–present) ===
The members of Pity Sex largely ceased playing music following the end of the band. Greaves formed a new band, Goodyhead, in 2018; they released their debut EP Proof of Life in July 2021. Heubel formed a solo project, Anthony Heubel & The High Lonesome, which released an EP entitled Tell Me What You Find in February 2021.

On May 5, 2022, Pity Sex made an announcement on their Twitter and Instagram page that they were playing Sound and Fury in Los Angeles, California in July. Greaves, Drake and St. Charles all participated in the reunion, with Drake's husband Michael Cesario joining on bass.

In June 2023, the band announced an anniversary vinyl reissue of Feast of Love.

In February 2024, the band announced they would perform at the Tied Down festival in Detroit, Michigan in June. Greaves, Drake and Cesario were joined by new drummer Derrick Daniel of Never Ending Game. In July 2024, as confirmed by the band's Instagram posts, Sean St. Charles returned to play drums.

== Musical style and influences ==
The band combined elements of indie rock, shoegaze, dream pop and noise rock in their music, and were described by Pitchfork as "post-coital pop-punk". AllMusic said the band's music "mirrors the sounds of the '90s."

Pity Sex has cited several bands as influences, including Sonic Youth, Meat Puppets, Jewel, the Cure, Alanis Morissette, Lemuria, Superheaven, Angel Dust, Yuck, Smashing Pumpkins, My Bloody Valentine, Pixies, Pavement, Dinosaur Jr., and Yo La Tengo.

== Members ==
Current members

- Brennan Greaves – guitar, vocals (2011–2016, 2022, 2024–present)
- Britty Drake – guitar, vocals (2011–2016, 2022, 2024–present)
- Michael Cesario – bass (2022, 2024–present)
- Sean St. Charles – drums (2011–2016, 2022, 2024–present)

Former members

- Brandan Pierce – bass (2011–2016)
- Michael Politowicz – bass (2015; UK tour)
- Anthony Heubel – guitar (2016; Japan/Australia tour)
- Derrick Daniel – drums (Tied Down Detroit 2024)

== Discography ==
=== Studio albums ===
- Feast of Love (Run for Cover Records, 2013)
- White Hot Moon (Run for Cover, 2016)

=== EPs ===
- Dark World (Forward Records, 2012)

=== Splits ===
- "Brave Bird / Pity Sex" (2011)
- "Adventures / Pity Sex" (Run for Cover, 2014)

=== Music videos ===
Year	Title	Director
2013	"Wind Up"	Alex Henery
2015	"What Might Soothe You?"	Joel Rakowski
2016	"Burden You"	Daniel Antebi
