= Reba Meyers =

American musician

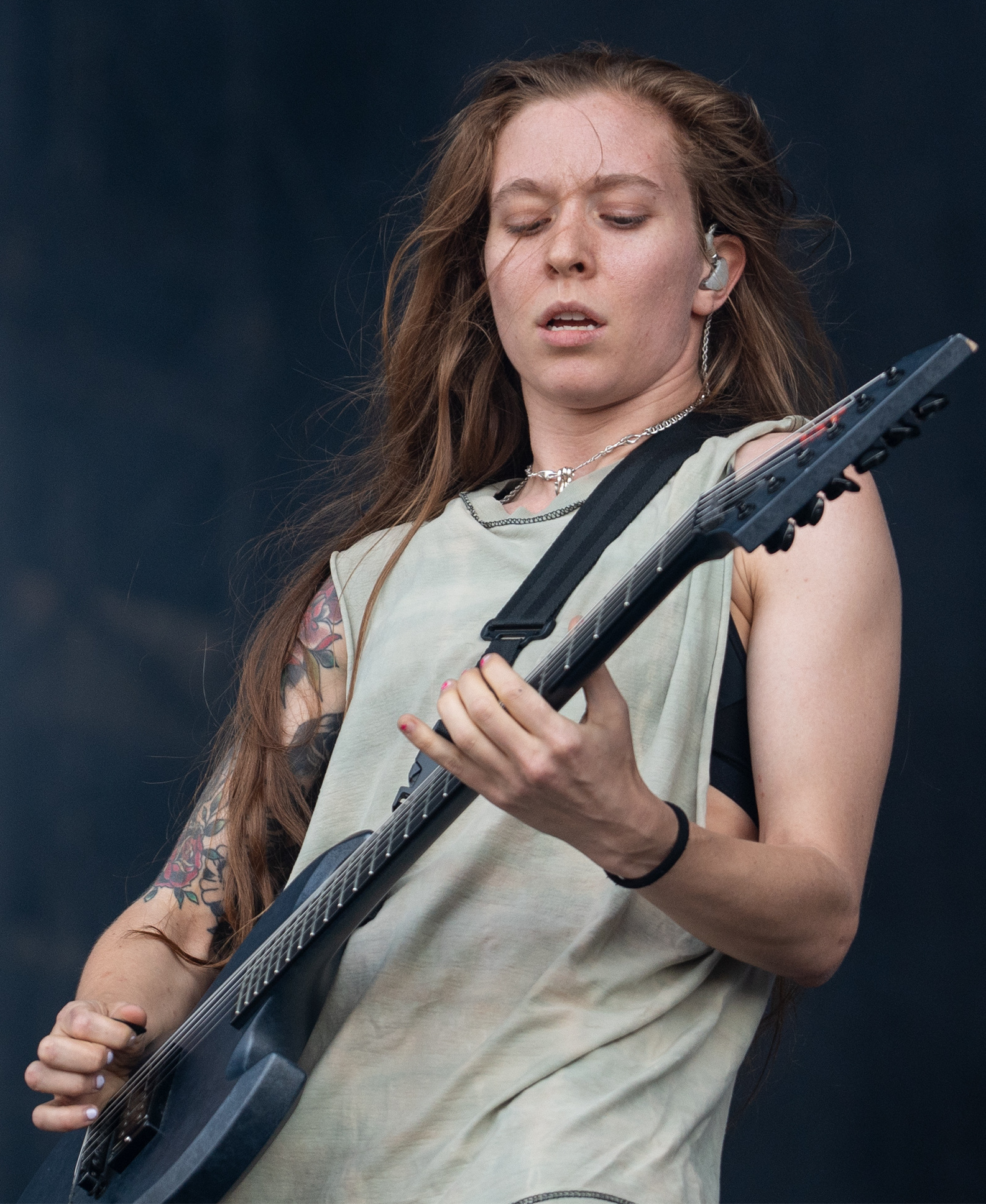
- Meyers performing with Code Orange in 2023

Background information
- Born: Pennsylvania, U.S.
- Genres: Metalcore; hardcore punk; alternative metal; industrial metal; grunge; alternative rock
- Occupations: Musician; singer; songwriter
- Instruments: Guitar; vocals; bass
- Years active: 2008–present
- Member of: Code Orange
- Formerly of: Adventures; Marilyn Manson

Reba Meyers is an American guitarist and vocalist, best known as a member of the metalcore band Code Orange. She co-formed the band in 2008 under the name Code Orange Kids, with the band shortening their name to Code Orange for the release of their 2014 album I Am King. They released a total of five studio albums, including Forever in 2017, Underneath in 2020, and The Above in 2023. The title tracks of Forever and Underneath both received nominations for the Grammy Award for Best Metal Performance. The band has been on hiatus since 2024.

Meyers began releasing solo work in 2022. Her debut solo EP Clouded World was released in 2025.

She was a touring member of Marilyn Manson from 2024 to 2026, where she performed lead guitar and backing vocals.

Meyers is the first female guitarist to have her own signature line of ESP Guitars.

== Career ==
Reba Meyers grew up in Pittsburgh, Pennsylvania, and began playing bass when she was 12 or 13 years old, when she met drummer Jami Morgan. The pair met while attending the Pittsburgh Creative and Performing Arts School. As a youth, Meyers gravitated toward more aggressive forms of rock, which she said "made me the type of guitar player that I am now. I loved punk music, I loved hardcore music, rock, alternative, all kinds of stuff." Tracks by Black Flag and Minor Threat were some of the first songs she learned to play, and she later spent time as a member of a Minor Threat tribute band. As she developed her playing style, she began to appreciate heavy metal bands such as Pantera.

Meyers and Morgan formed Code Orange Kids in 2008, while they were still in high school. Meyers was originally the band's bassist, but switched to electric guitar in 2011 when their guitarist quit and Joe Goldman joined as their permanent bassist. Code Orange Kids released their debut album Love Is Love/Return to Dust in 2012. The band shortened their name to Code Orange for the release of their second album, 2014's I Am King. Code Orange released their third studio album, Forever, in 2017, followed by Underneath in 2020. The title tracks of both of the latter albums received Grammy nominations for Best Metal Performance.

In addition to her guitar work on the latter album, Meyers began experimenting with Pro Tools, creating digital samples that were directly incorporated into the mixes. Her guitar and digital work on Underneath was used as the basis for Code Orange's 2023 remix album, What Is Really Underneath? The band's fifth studio album, The Above, was released in 2023. Meyers worked primarily with guitarist Dom Landolina to create the riffs for the album, and sang lead vocals on several tracks, including the single "Mirror". Meyers said she felt "a lot of tension and pressure" when she wrote the song, but refused to elaborate, saying only that it was "really personal shit". The song was a stylistic departure from the rest of the band's material, incorporating elements of trip hop. She said the song is "the climax of this style of my writing in this band thus far." When discussing the song's lyrical content, she asked fans to "Take a look in the mirror, are you bored?" The Smashing Pumpkins frontman Billy Corgan sang vocals on the song "Take Shape", an experience Meyers described as "magical".

Code Orange has been inactive since 2024.

=== Marilyn Manson ===
Meyers became a live member of Marilyn Manson in August 2024, and appeared in the music video for their song "Raise the Red Flag", released that same month. Meyers was met with criticism on social media after it was revealed she had joined the band, following the abuse allegations levied against the eponymous vocalist, allegations he has denied. In response, she issued a statement saying she was "proud to represent the growth, confidence, forgiveness, humanity, and change that comes with this, and to be up there [on stage] with such talented motherfuckers. Everyone is aiming for growth and not stagnation. World needs that attitude right now." She received messages of support from Puciato, Andy Williams of Every Time I Die, Ray Luzier of Korn, and her Manson bandmates Piggy D. and Gil Sharone. Meyers departed Marilyn Manson in 2026 to focus on solo work.

=== Solo work ===
Meyers sang on "Lowered", a song by The Dillinger Escape Plan vocalist Greg Puciato on his 2022 solo album Mirrorcell. She also directed a music video for the "GP/RM" remix of the song.

Meyers released her first solo single, "Certain Uncertainty", in December 2024. The song features her sister Judy Meyers on violin and Manson drummer Gil Sharone. The song was released digitally and as a limited edition cassette single, with its music video directed by Puciato. In conjunction with the single, she released merchandise benefitting the Braddock Youth Project, a Pennsylvanian non-profit organization supporting the creation of sustainable community development projects. Her second solo single, "Got Your Hold on Me", was released in April 2025, and was produced by Meyers and mixed by Steve Evetts. Her third solo single, "Clouded World", was released in June. The song was recorded by Steve Albini, and shares its title with her debut solo album.

She embarked on her first solo tour in August 2025, with her debut solo EP, Clouded World, released that same month.

== Musical style and equipment ==
"I'm glad I can represent not only female guitarists, but also any guitar player who isn't the same as the rest of the roster. I feel like I come from a different side of things. When you're born into punk music, you don't play the typical way. I'm self-taught; I learned how to play based on who I saw in my city. Nowadays, everyone can look on YouTube, but growing up, it was more about taking little pieces from other musicians in Pittsburgh and my friends. [The guitar represents] that more unique, self-taught style."

— Meyers on being the first woman to have a Signature ESP Guitar released in her name.

Guitar World described Meyers as "one of modern metal's most distinctive players". She is the first woman to have a Signature ESP Guitar released in her name. The guitar is titled the LTD RM-600, and is based on ESP's Viper model. It features an EMP 81 pickup, a reverse headstock, an EMG TKO kill switch, a 3-piece maple neck with a Macassar ebony fingerboard, and a mahogany body with a black marble satin finish. The guitar is heavier than other models made by ESP, as Meyers said she was used to playing heavier guitars, so the company "worked with me on that."

Guitar World also said Meyers "crafts some of modern metal's most innovative tones". Her touring pedalboard consists of an ISP Technologies Decimator for noise gate, an Ibanez Tube Screamer for overdrive, an AMT WH-1 Wah, a Boss PS-6 Harmonist, and a Moog Minifooger MF Ring. She also uses a second pedalboard consisting of EarthQuaker Devices, including a Sea Machine chorus, an Afterneath reverb, a Grand Orbiter phaser, a Disaster Transport Sr. delay, an Astral Destiny octave, an Abominable Hellmouth overdrive, and a Bananana Mandala glitch pedal and Z.Vex Sonar tremolo.

Meyers is also proficient in digital audio manipulation and MIDI configuration. Her Code Orange bandmate Jami Morgan said that her digital work on their 2020 album Underneath was comparable to "something that you gotta pay people to do for $30,000, but we can't, so she had to learn how to do it all from YouTube".

== Discography ==
EPs

- Clouded World (2025)

Singles

- "Certain Uncertainty" (2024)
- "Got Your Hold on Me" (2025)
- "Clouded World" (2025)
