= I Am King =

Studio album by Code Orange
- Released: September 2, 2014
- Recorded: 2013–2014
- Studios: God City Studios (Salem, Massachusetts); The Pit (Van Nuys, California); The Braddock Hit Factory (Braddock, Pennsylvania)
- Genres: Metalcore; hardcore punk; post-hardcore; sludge metal
- Length: 32:23
- Label: Deathwish
- Producer: Kurt Ballou

Code Orange chronology
Love Is Love/Return to Dust (2013)	I Am King (2014)	Forever (2017)

I Am King is the second studio album by American hardcore punk band Code Orange and first to be released under this moniker after previously being referred to as "Code Orange Kids". The Kurt Ballou-produced album was released on September 2, 2014 through Deathwish Inc. To promote the album, Code Orange released music videos for the tracks "I Am King" and "Dreams in Inertia", in addition to an online stream for "My World".

== Writing and recording ==
Code Orange entered the studio with Kurt Ballou in February 2014. Ballou is the guitarist of Converge and previously recorded Code Orange's 2012 debut album Love Is Love/Return to Dust. Code Orange drummer Jami Morgan described I Am King as a "different" album that will mark "a very new era for our band", and also elaborated: "A lot of the heavier parts are heavier and sometimes more obvious. A lot of the odd parts are weirder and a little more anti-social. Things are a lot more blended together." After the band wrote the "skeletons" of the songs for I Am King, Code Orange revisited the tracks to look for moments where they could, "incorporate these little sonic nuggets that excited us or intrigued us." The songs were also influenced by metal acts such as the groove metal band Sepultura, metalcore band Prayer for Cleansing and grunge band Alice in Chains.

== Composition ==
Critics drew several comparisons between parts or all of I Am King and other metal and hardcore bands, including Converge, Disembodied, the Locust, Melvins, Norma Jean, Refused, Vision of Disorder, and Zao, and noted that the band's heavier music styles on the album included metalcore, hardcore punk, post-hardcore, sludge metal, death metal, mathcore, and grindcore. Some critics noted some non-hardcore influences on select tracks, including shoegaze, post-punk, dream pop, grunge, and indie rock, and noted similarities to the Smiths and Lush.

== Promotion and marketing ==
Code Orange's panther-head logo used to tease and promote I Am King

Code Orange (then known as Code Orange Kids) began teasing the release of its sophomore album 7 months in advance in February 2014 by posting an image of a green panther with a black backdrop accompanied by the phrase "King 2014" on its social media sites. The following month, Code Orange launched a mysterious viral marketing campaign and website dubbed "Thinners of the Herd", which asked for fans' names and home addresses.

In June 2014, Code Orange released a music video for the title track, "I Am King", directed by Max Moore. Writing for Exclaim!, Gregory Adams said "I Am King" is "a little gory" and also said, "While the black and white video strings together savage shots of the group ripping through fast and punchy hardcore licks and a monster of a mosh section from inside a straw-strewn barn, there's even more menacing footage mixed into the clip's runtime." In July 2014, Code Orange released an online stream of the song "My World", followed by a music video for "Dreams in Inertia" in August 2014, again directed by Max Moore. Writing for Fangoria, Samuel Zimmerman described the "Dreams in Inertia" video, stating: "Admittedly mellower (for a spell), the video for 'Dreams in Inertia' is full of occult vibes and lo-fi creep." Adams also discussed the video, commenting: "While we see the band delivering the tune throughout the video, we also get a glimpse of a guy's bathtub purification and a dour crew's march through a forest filled with nooses. Code Orange meet up with the other faction late in the video to offer a few sips of Kool-Aid, which may not be a gesture of good faith." I Am King was made available for online streaming in its entirety a week ahead of its release on August 26.

For supporting tours, Code Orange performed sets of almost entirely new material from I Am King. In an interview about an upcoming show in Portland, Oregon, drummer Jami Morgan explained, "We're gonna play one song off [Love Is Love/Return to Dust] and that's it. Nothing else matters. To me, when you make a record that [makes you] feel like how we feel about this record, the other records don't matter. They're obsolete. They were on a path to get to this record." Code Orange's first tour in support of I Am King was a brief stint opening for Killswitch Engage and Ringworm surrounding its participation in the This Is Hardcore festival on July 24, 2014. This was followed by a September–October 2014 co-headlining tour with Twitching Tongues.

== Critical reception ==
Professional ratings
Aggregate scores
Source	Rating
Metacritic	87/100
Review scores
Source	Rating
Alternative Press	4.5/5 stars
Consequence of Sound	B
Exclaim!	8/10
Metal Hammer	4/5 stars
Punknews.org	4/5 stars
Rock Sound	9/10

Upon its release, I Am King received critical acclaim from music critics. At Metacritic, which assigns a normalized rating out of 100 to reviews from music critics, the album received an average score of 87, which indicates "universal acclaim", based on four reviews.

Writing for Consequence of Sound Ryan Bray stated: "Guttural metalcore still reigns loudly over any dreamy, indie rock ambitions that Code Orange entertain on I Am King. ... But they're trying, and in a genre that adheres so closely to formula like hardcore, metal, and the spaces in between, that in and of itself means something." Andy Biddulph of Rock Sound described the album as "breathtaking" and wrote: "With its heady mix of head-caving drone, battering hardcore and classic rock riffery, I Am King is a record unlike any other." Bradley Zorgdrager of Exclaim! praised for its "crushing cacophony", stating "it's the moments of calm before (and during) the storm here that makes I Am King worthy of its crown."

Terry Bezer of Metal Hammer complimented the band's progression from their debut album stating, "for all the change, Code Orange's progression in sound doesn't feel unnatural off the back of Love Is Love // Return To Dust and marks a different but no less enthralling (or heavy) experience." Punknews.org called the album "heavy and full of rage" and considered it "[to be] in line with what the band has always done best."

=== Commercial performance ===
The album debuted on the Billboard 200 at 96, making I Am King the first Code Orange album to appear on a national chart. I Am King also peaked at number 10 on the Top Hard Rock Albums chart and number 29 on the Top Rock Albums chart.

== Track listing ==
No.	Title	Length
1.	"I Am King"	2:38
2.	"Slowburn"	2:31
3.	"Dreams in Inertia"	5:00
4.	"Unclean Spirit"	2:11
5.	"Alone in a Room"	3:09
6.	"My World"	2:56
7.	"Starve"	3:48
8.	"Your Body is Ready..."	1:25
9.	"Thinners of the Herd"	2:47
10.	"Bind You"	1:43
11.	"Mercy"	4:15
Total length:		32:23

== Personnel ==
I Am King personnel adapted from CD liner notes.

=== Code Orange ===
- Eric Balderose – guitar, vocals
- Joe Goldman – bass
- Reba Meyers – guitar, vocals
- Jami Morgan – drums, vocals

=== Additional musicians ===
- AJ Borish (Path to Misery) – guest vocals on "Slowburn"
- Joe Sanderson (Eternal Sleep) – guest vocals on "Mercy"
- Eric Schaeffer (Unit 731) – guest vocals on "My World"
- Scott Vogel (Terror) – guest vocals on "Unclean Spirit"

=== Production ===
- Kurt Ballou – recording, mixing, engineering at God City Studios
- Brad Boatright – mastering
- Dave Rosenstraus – additional recording at The Braddock Hit Factory
- Taylor Young – additional recording at The Pit

=== Artwork ===
- Kimi Hanauer – artwork, layout, photos
- Jami Morgan – art direction

== Charts ==
Chart performance for I Am King
Chart (2014)	Peak position
US Indie Store Album Sales (Billboard)	14
US Top Hard Rock Albums (Billboard)	10
