= Kimi Hanauer =

Artist, cultural organizer, and writer (born 1993)

- Born: 1993 (age 32–33)
- Education: BFA, Maryland Institute College of Art
- Known for: Press Press
- Website: www.kimihanauer.com

Kimi Hanauer (born 1993), also known as kimi malka hanauer, is an artist, writer, musician, and cultural organizer. They are the founder of Press Press, an interdisciplinary publishing house that focuses on underrepresented voices and narratives. They have worked in Baltimore, Maryland and Los Angeles, California. From 2012 to 2016, Hanauer was a member of the indie rock band Adventures with current Code Orange band members Reba Meyers, Jami Morgan, Joe Goldman, and Dominic Landolina.

== Biography ==
Kimi Hanauer was born in Jaffa and raised in Pittsburgh, Pennsylvania. They received their Bachelor of Fine Arts degree from the Maryland Institute College of Art in 2015 and their Master of Fine Arts in interdisciplinary studio at the University of California, Los Angeles in 2021. They are currently an assistant professor in the Graduate and Undergraduate Communications Design Departments at Pratt Institute.

In 2013, Hanauer developed Paradise Now, an open-ended game in which participants must follow abstract instructions to earn points. The game was first established Penthouse Gallery in Baltimore, where Hanauer was working. The game was conceptualized as a platform for the participants to express themselves. The title of the game comes from the film Paradise Now, which focused on the lives of two Palestinian suicide bombers through a humanistic lens.

In 2014, Hanauer established Press Press, an interdisciplinary publishing house. Hanauer was inspired to start the publishing house after volunteering as an ESL creative writing teacher at the Refugee Youth Project (RYP) in Baltimore. They collaborated with other RYP volunteers to launch Press Press. The books are distributed at art book fairs such as the New York Art Book Fair and Los Angeles Art Book Fair.

In 2016, Hanauer published "The Making of: Publics and Liberation," which they edited. The book featured conversations with various artists and activists in Baltimore, including Jenné Afiya (Balti Gurls), Fire Angelou (Daughters of the Diaspora), Emeline Boehringer & Kory Sanders (Beast Grrl Collective), Sarrita Hunn (Temporary Art Review).
