= Code Orange (band) =

American metalcore band

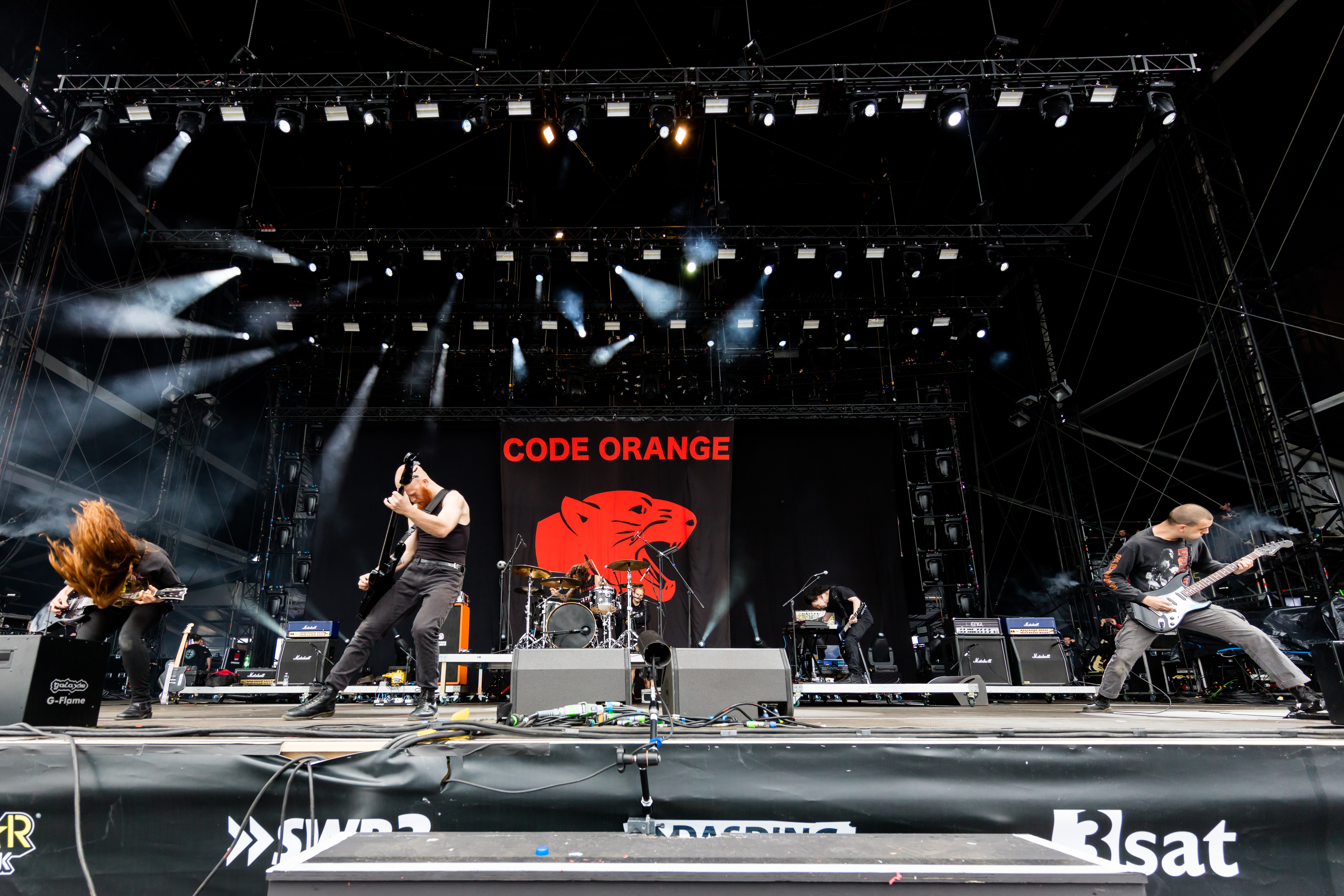
- Code Orange performing at Rock am Ring in 2017; From left to right: Meyers, Goldman, Morgan, Balderose and Landolina

Background information
- Also known as: Code Orange Kids (2008–2014)
- Origin: Pittsburgh, Pennsylvania, U.S.
- Genres: Metalcore; hardcore punk; alternative metal; industrial metal
- Works: Code Orange discography
- Years active: 2008–2025 (on hiatus)
- Labels: Blue Grape Music; Roadrunner; Deathwish
- Spinoffs: Adventures; NOWHERE2RUN
- Members: Eric "Shade" Balderose; Reba Meyers; Jami Morgan; Joe Goldman; Dominic Landolina; Max Portnoy
- Past members: Bob Rizzo; Greg Kern
- Website: codeorangetoth.com

Code Orange (formerly known as Code Orange Kids) (Note: The band formed in 2008 under the name "Code Orange Kids" and kept this name until 2014 when they shortened it to "Code Orange" during the promotion of their second studio album I Am King. This change might not be permanent, however. As Decibel writer Shawn Macomber puts it, "Code Orange dropped 'Kids' from the moniker basically on a whim—it might return; it might not—to prove nothing is static, nothing is sacred in its world.") is an American metalcore band that formed in Pittsburgh, Pennsylvania, in 2008, while the members of the band were still in high school.

The band started as a hardcore punk band - under their original name of Code Orange Kids - and started to shift to metalcore on the release of their debut full-length album Love Is Love/Return to Dust, before incorporating more wide-ranging influences on their more recent albums, such as Forever and Underneath, as they began to incorporate elements of grunge, nu metal, electronica, and industrial.

The band originally signed to Deathwish Inc. for their first two studio albums: Love Is Love/Return to Dust, which was released in November 2012 under their original name, and I Am King in September 2014. Their third album, Forever was released in January 2017 through Roadrunner Records, and fourth album, Underneath, was released in March 2020, also on Roadrunner Records. The band's latest album, The Above was released on September 29, 2023. The band has also released three EPs, one live album, thirteen music videos, three live DVDs, and six other shorter releases (splits/singles).

They have received one Kerrang! Award for Best International Breakthrough (2018), have been nominated for two Grammy Awards for Best Metal Performance (2017 and 2020), have been nominated by Loudwire Music Awards for Metal Album of the Year and Metal Artist of the Year (2017), and been nominated twice by Metal Hammer Golden Gods Awards for Breakthrough Artist (2017 and 2018) which they won in 2018.

The band currently consists of vocalist Jami Morgan, guitarist and vocalist Reba Meyers, keyboardist/programmer/guitarist Eric "Shade" Balderose, bassist Joe Goldman, guitarist Dominic Landolina, and drummer Max Portnoy. Their touring lineup also formerly included drummer Ethan Young (of Thirty Nights of Violence) between March 2020 and October 2021, with Portnoy serving as touring drummer thereafter until his induction into the band as an official member in 2023.

== History ==
=== Formation and early years (2008–2012) ===
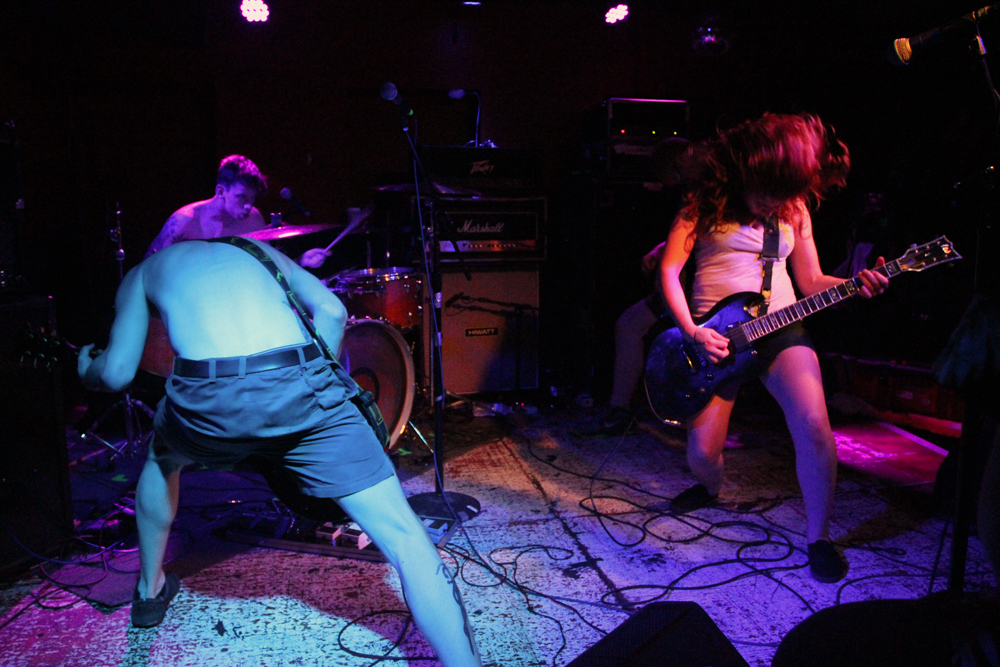
The band as Code Orange Kids in 2013

The band formed under the name "Code Orange Kids" in 2008 in Pittsburgh, Pennsylvania. They started out playing "really straightforward punk," but would eventually take their music in a heavier direction with the introduction of new member, Bob Rizzo, who met members of the band at a local show. By early 2012, the band described themselves as "doomy, abrasive" hardcore punk similar to Black Flag, Converge or Integrity.

The band found some difficulty touring in their early days, due to the fact that they were not old enough to play at some of the clubs, and because many of the members were still in high school, could only tour between semesters. Despite this, Code Orange Kids opened for such bands as the Misfits, The Bronx, Nekromantix and Anti-Flag. Early self-published releases from Code Orange Kids included 2009's Winter Tour Demo, 2010's Demo 2010 and 2011's Embrace Me/Erase Me. Code Orange Kids released the EP Cycles through Mayfly Records in 2011.

Code Orange Kids announced they signed to Deathwish Inc. in January 2012. At the time of their signing, the average age among the band members was only 18 years old. In April 2012, the band released a split EP with Full of Hell through Topshelf Records. A Max Moore-directed music video for the song "V (My Body Is A Well)" from the EP was also released. Code Orange Kids toured North America with Touché Amoré, Defeater and Birds in Row in April 2012, and toured Europe in July 2012.

=== Love Is Love/Return to Dust (2012–2013) ===
Code Orange Kids released their debut full-length album, Love Is Love/Return to Dust, in October 2012 through Deathwish. The album was recorded in June 2012 with Kurt Ballou of Converge at his own GodCity studio. Commenting on getting to work with Ballou, drummer Jami Morgan said, "Kurt has made tons of our favorite records and we respect him as an engineer and musician immensely, as many others do." The album's release was preceded by a music video for the song "Flowermouth (The Leech)" in October 2012.

The band began touring in support of Love Is Love/Return to Dust with a short Canadian tour with Bane in October 2012 followed by a North American tour with Gaza and Full of Hell from November through December 2012. On this tour, the band was robbed of over US$10,000 worth of belongings in New Orleans, Louisiana. In February/March 2013, Code Orange Kids toured the U.S. with H_{2}O and Terror; with Circle Takes the Square and Full of Hell in Europe in July/August 2013; with Terror and Fucked Up in North America in October 2013; and with Every Time I Die and Letlive in November/December 2013. In April 2013, the band released a 4-way split 7-inch with Tigers Jaw, The World Is a Beautiful Place & I Am No Longer Afraid to Die, and Self Defense Family.

=== Name change and I Am King (2014–2015) ===
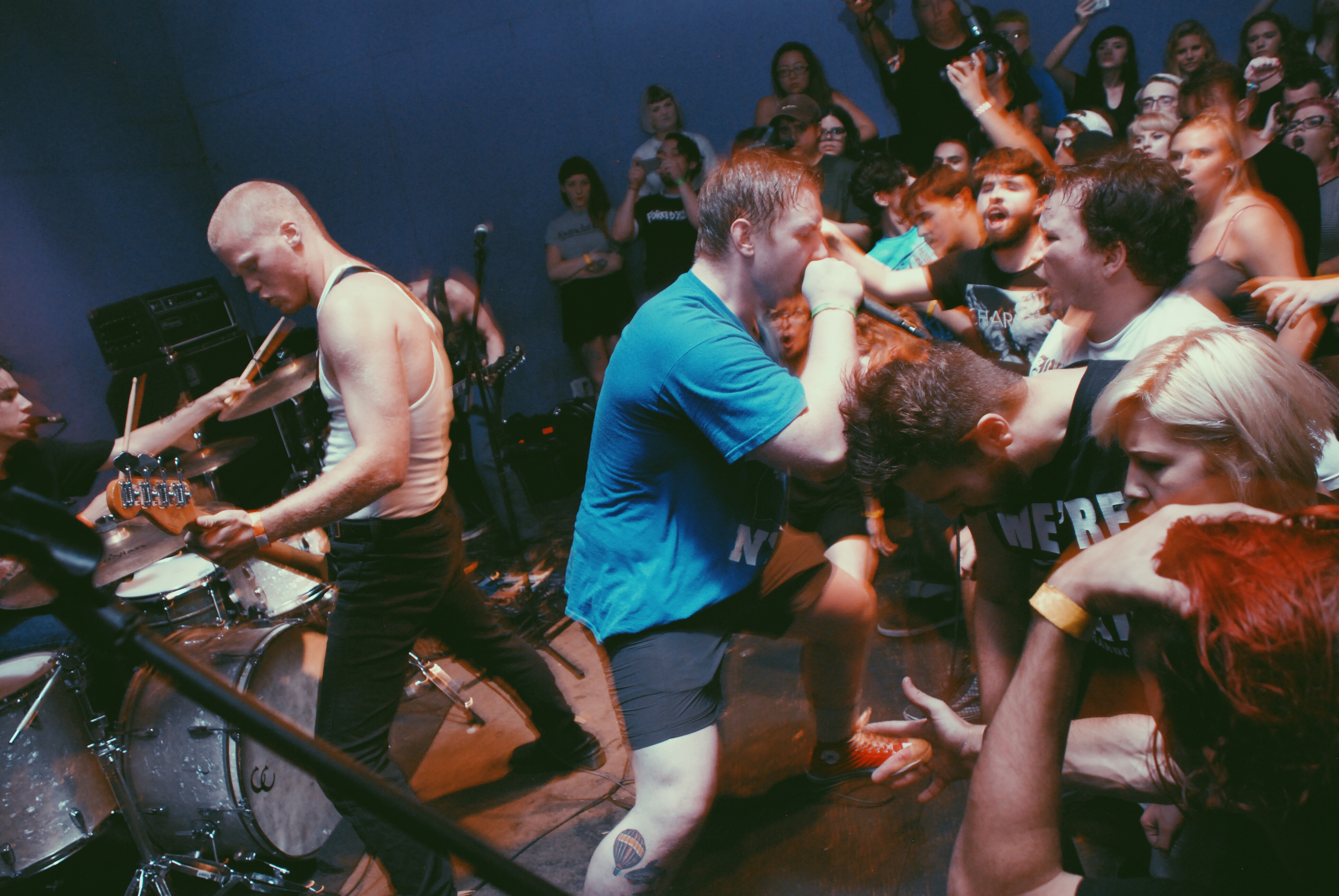
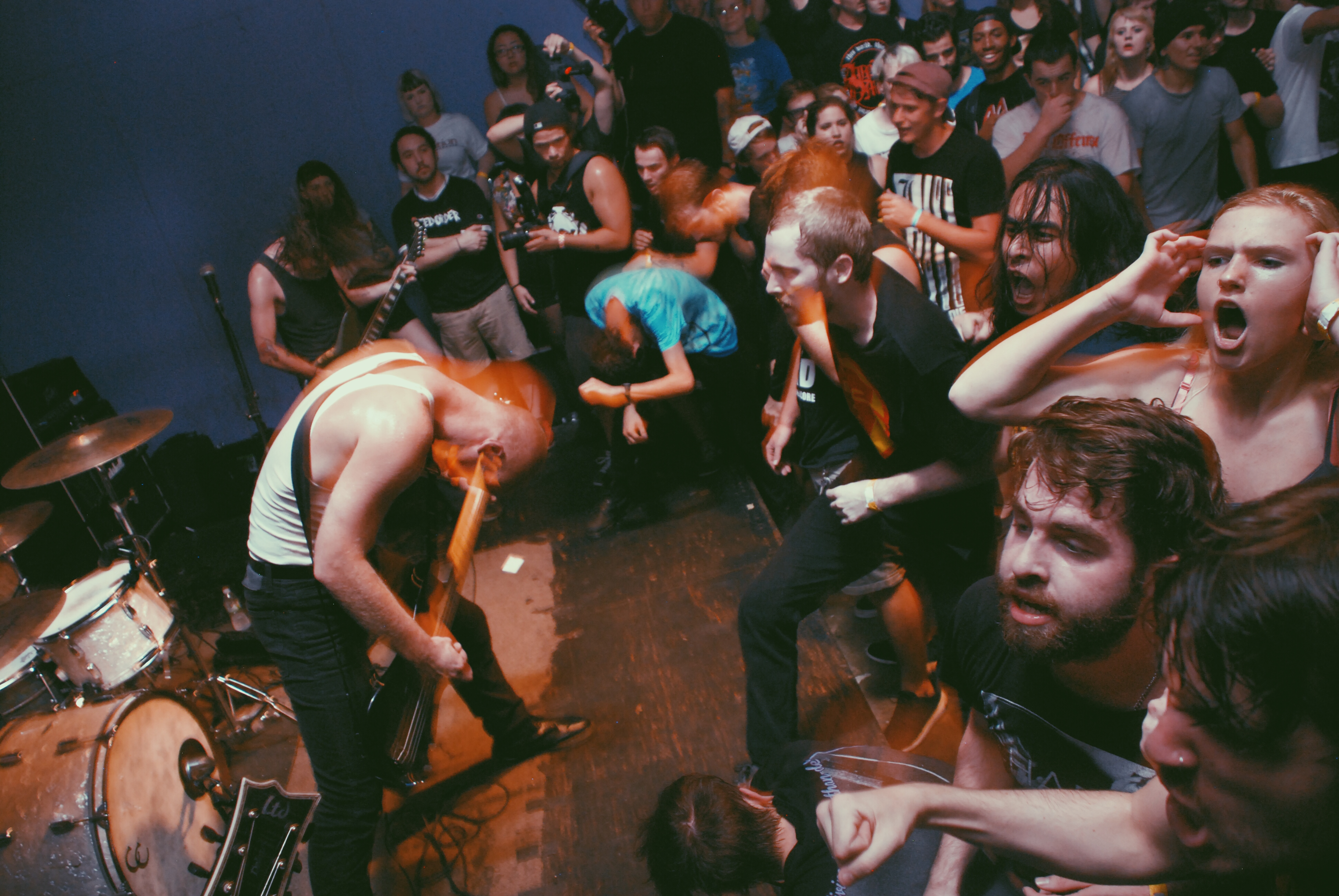
Code Orange performing in 2014

Recording for Code Orange Kids' (who would soon change their band name) second studio album began in February 2014 with Kurt Ballou. Speaking on the overall sound of the new record, Morgan said it would mark "a very new era for our band," and that, "It's different. A lot of the heavier parts are heavier and sometimes more obvious. A lot of the odd parts are weirder and a little more anti-social. Things are a lot more blended together." On June 5, 2014, the band announced that it was changing its name from "Code Orange Kids" to "Code Orange," and would be releasing its sophomore album titled I Am King on September 2, 2014. Three months before the release of the album, the band released a music video for the title track, "I Am King," in June 2014 followed by an online stream of "My World" in July 2014 and a music video for "Dreams in Inertia" in August 2014.

Code Orange's first tour in support of I Am King was a six-date stint with Killswitch Engage surrounding the band's participation in This is Hardcore Festival 2014 in July/August 2014, followed by a North American co-headlining tour with Twitching Tongues in September and October. They also appeared on 2015's Rockstar Mayhem Festival, and toured the U.S. from June to August.

=== Forever and The Hurt Will Go On (2016–2019) ===
In April 2016, Code Orange signed to Roadrunner Records for their third studio album, which at the time was tentatively due out in late 2016.

Leading up to the new album's release, the band toured the U.S. with Deftones in May 2016 and performed sporadic mid-year festival dates, including This Is Hardcore in August. In October 2016, the band released a new single, "Forever." It was revealed to be the title track to their third album, Forever, which was then set for release on January 13, 2017. Following the release of the initial single, the band released an animated music video for "Kill The Creator" in December 2016, as well as two further promotional singles, "Ugly" and "Bleeding in the Blur," in January 2017, prior to the album's official release date of January 13.

A music video for the track "The Mud", directed by Balderose and Dmitry Zakharov, was premiered on Adult Swim's Toonami block on September 30, 2017. The album was featured on various best of 2017 lists including, Rolling Stone's "20 Best Metal Albums of 2017", Revolver's "20 Best Albums of 2017" and The Independent's "Top 20 Rock & Metal Albums of 2017."

In support of the album, the band began touring as a five-piece. Dominic Landolina – who also played lead guitar in Adventures alongside Meyers, Morgan and Goldman – was brought in as a touring guitarist and later became a full-time member, after being secretly unveiled as a new member in the music video for "Forever".

In August 2017, "Bleeding in the Blur" was announced as one of the official theme songs for NXT's NXT TakeOver: Brooklyn III event. At the event, held at the Barclays Center in Brooklyn, New York, Code Orange were the first band to ever play live at an NXT show. They opened the event with a performance of "Bleeding in the Blur," before later performing a live version of Aleister Black's entrance music, "Root of All Evil," with Incendiary vocalist Brendan Garrone; who appears on the original version of the song. The band played Black to the ring for his match with Hideo Itami. On December 28 and 29, Code Orange and Daughters supported mathcore band The Dillinger Escape Plan on their final two shows. Their appearance came about after Morgan became friends with Dillinger frontman Greg Puciato, who invited them to these performances.

Code Orange released a new single, "Only One Way", on February 8, 2018, through the Adult Swim Singles Program. They followed it with a remix by guitarist Eric "Shade" Balderose called "only1 (the hard way)".

On June 21, 2018, the band released a 3-track EP, The Hurt Will Go On. Along with the remix of "Hurt Goes On," the EP also featured two brand-new tracks: "3 Knives" and "The Hunt," which features guest vocalist Corey Taylor of Slipknot and Stone Sour.

During WWE's pay-per-view SummerSlam in August 2019, professional wrestler Bray Wyatt, while in his Fiend persona, premiered new entrance music performed by Code Orange. The song, "Let Me In," is a re-imagining of Mark Crozer's song "Live in Fear," which was Wyatt's old theme before leaving WWE programming in November 2018 and creating a new version of his character. "Let Me In" charted on the Scottish Singles Chart at number 79 for a solitary week beginning on August 16, 2019, becoming Code Orange's first song to chart on the Scottish Singles Chart.

=== Underneath, Under the Skin, and What Is Really Underneath? (2020–2023) ===
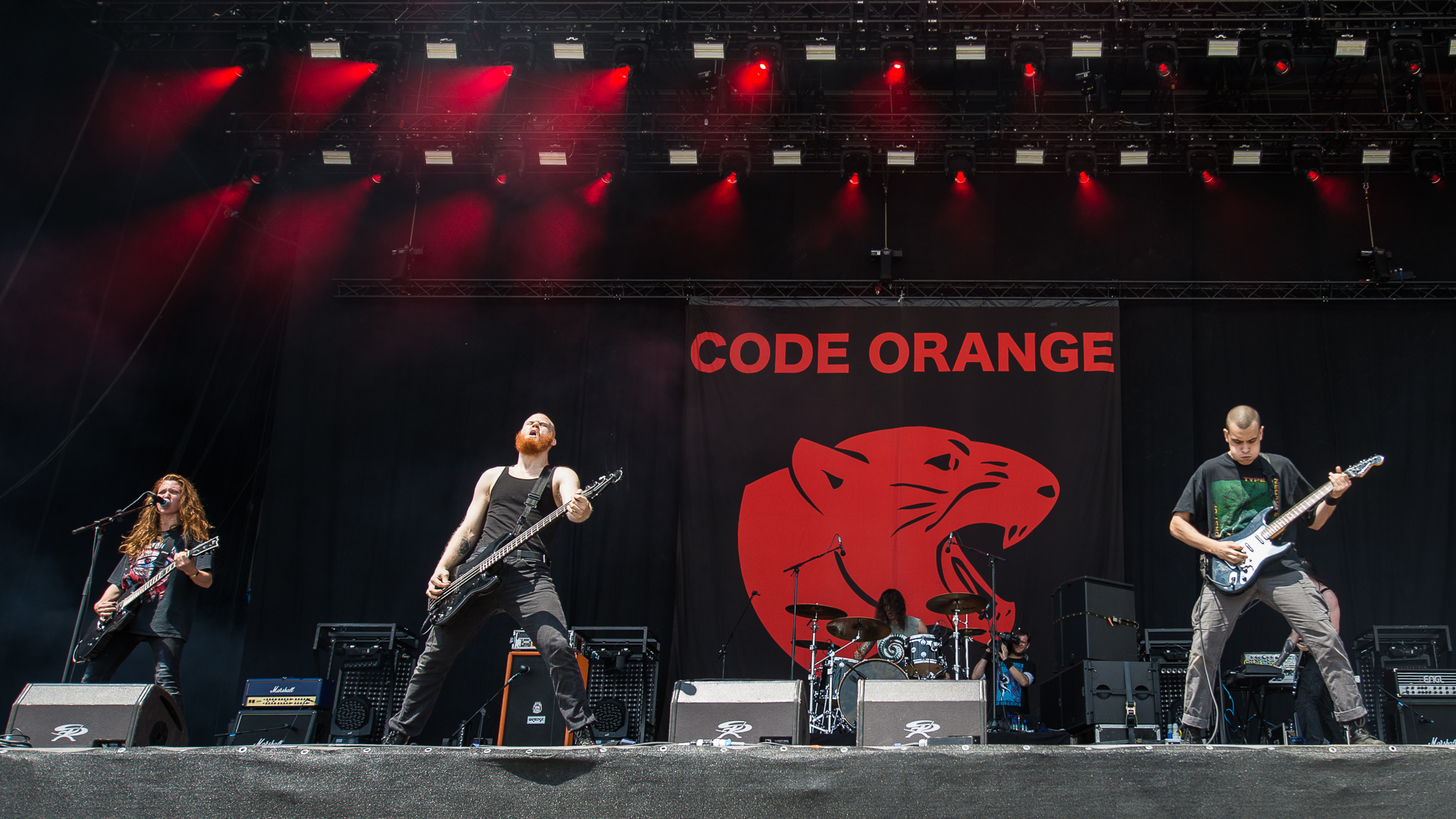
Code Orange at Rock im Park 2017

On January 10, 2020, the band released a music video for "Underneath", the first single from their fourth album, Underneath. On February 7, 2020, they released a music video for their second single "Swallowing the Rabbit Whole". On March 9, 2020, the band released the third single "Sulfur Surrounding". An animated video directed by Eric Balderose, was released on March 9 along with the single.

The full album was released on March 13, 2020. On March 14, 2020, Code Orange performed a live-streamed album release concert in an empty venue on Twitch due to the COVID-19 pandemic. The performance took place at the Roxian Theatre and was called "Last Ones Left: In Fear of the End". The performance was later officially released on YouTube.

The album was produced by Nick Raskulinecz. The album was also produced by Jami Morgan and co-produced by Will Yip. Yip also helped produce the band's previous album. Producer and musician Chris Vrenna (formerly of Nine Inch Nails and Marilyn Manson) helped Eric Balderose develop the electronics, the arrangement of the many layers of production, and the use of white noise and other various noise elements for the album.

Following the release of their fourth album, Jami stopped performing drums at live shows to focus solely on vocals, with Ethan Young being revealed as the band's touring drummer in March 2020, to which Morgan commented: "He's a great guy and I think he'll continue to earn his spot, but for now he's an empty vessel. He's our drumming muse for now. We don't want to be married to anyone yet. You don't know how people are going to be 'til they are."

On June 7, 2020, the band performed at NXT TakeOver: In Your House at Full Sail University. On September 4, 2020, the band released a live album titled, Under the Skin. The album featured acoustic renditions of songs from the bands discography, as well as a cover of "Down in a Hole" by Alice In Chains.

In November 2020, the band was nominated for their second Grammy award. The band received a nomination in the Best Metal Performance category for the song "Underneath." They would ultimately lose the Grammy to Body Count.

On January 23, 2021, an animated motion-capture video for the song "Autumn and Carbine" was premiered on Adult Swim's Toonami. The video was directed by Eric Balderose and Jami Morgan (under the nowhere2run productions moniker) and utilized motion-capture to create 3D models of the band members themselves.

On October 14, 2021, the band announced that Max Portnoy, son of Mike Portnoy, and drummer of Pennsylvania nu metal band Tallah, had joined the group as their new touring drummer.

On November 11, 2021, the band released a new standalone single titled "Out for Blood" along with its accompanying music video. The song was recorded with Green Day and My Chemical Romance producer Rob Cavallo.

On December 16, 2022, the band premiered new entrance music, the song, "Shatter" for the wrestler Bray Wyatt. This is the second time the band performed entrance music for Wyatt. On February 17, 2023, the band released a remix album, What Is Really Underneath?, based on the band's fourth studio album, Underneath. It is the bands' first release through the newly formed semi independent label, Blue Grape Music.

=== The Above and hiatus (2023–2025) ===
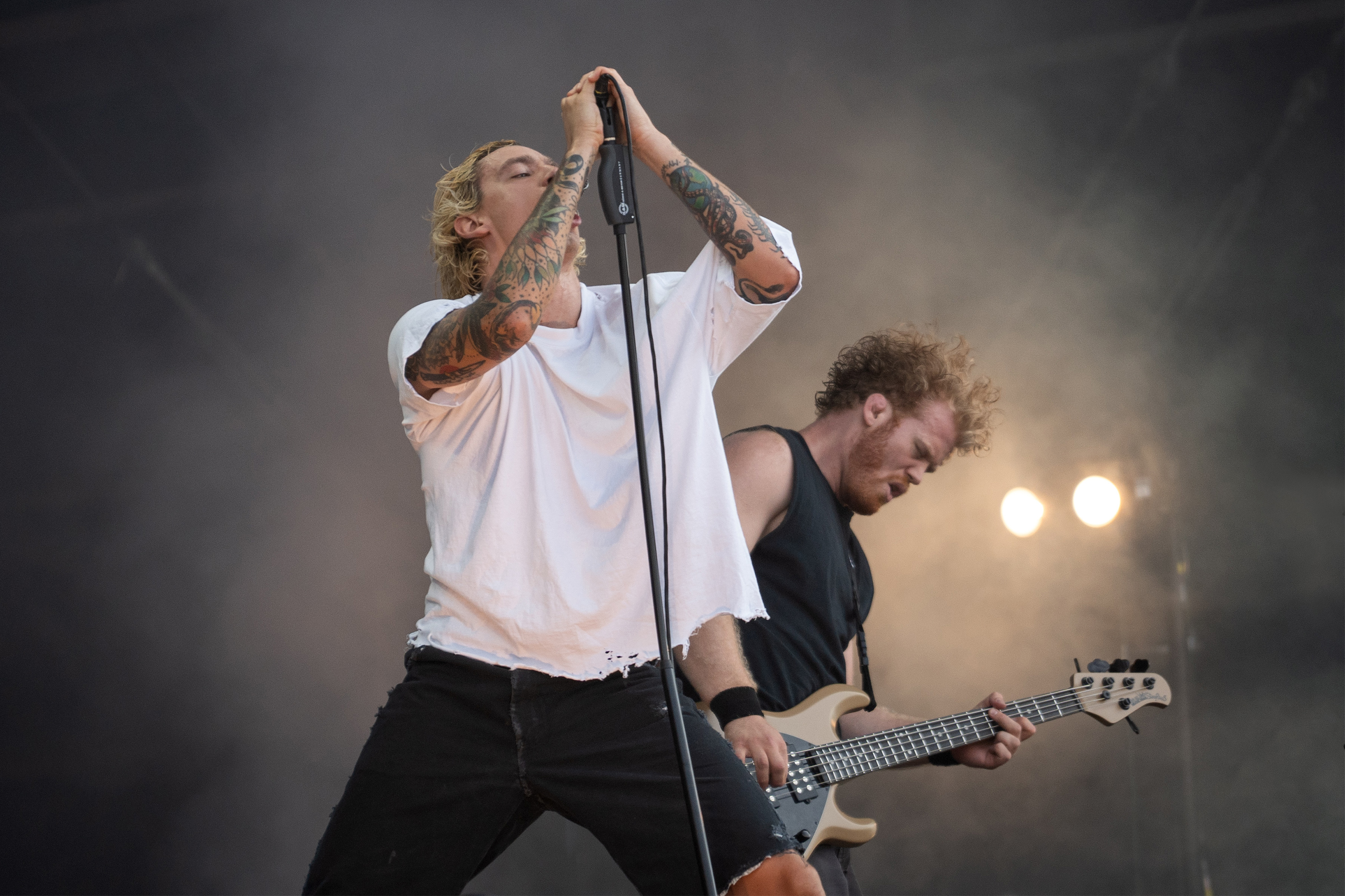
Code Orange at Hellfest 2023

On May 30 2023, the band shared a video on their YouTube channel entitled "Code Orange Slams modern music critics". However, the video served as a bait-and-switch: It instead featured several minutes of a staged torture sequence before a new song played at the end. The day after the video, on June 1, 2023, the band released two new songs: "Grooming My Replacement", which played in the video, and "The Game". On July 18, 2023, the band released the single "Take Shape" featuring Billy Corgan of the Smashing Pumpkins. On the same day, the band announced their fifth studio album, The Above, which was released on September 29, 2023. It was engineered by Steve Albini, serving as one of the final albums he worked on before his death the following year. On September 6, 2023, the band released the next single, "Mirror".

On January 12, 2024, the band canceled their upcoming headline tour and ShipRocked cruise / Pulp Summer Slam due to health problems their guitarist Dominic Landolina has been facing for the past year. In April 2025, vocalist Jami Morgan announced that the band was on hiatus, describing them as being "on the shelf". Morgan cited Landolina's health issues, as well as the pursuit of other projects by himself, Balderose and Meyers as the main reasons for the band's hiatus.

== Musical style and influences ==
Code Orange has been described as many different genres throughout their discography primarily, metalcore, hardcore punk, alternative metal, industrial metal. They have also been described as metallic hardcore, industrial hardcore, post-hardcore, nu metal, nu metalcore, heavy metal, sludge metal, noise, industrial, alternative rock, and grunge. (Note: Musical styles: "metalcore"; "hardcore punk"; "alternative metal"; "industrial metal"; "alternative rock"; "metallic hardcore"; "industrial hardcore"; "post-hardcore"; "nu metal"; "nu metalcore"; "heavy metal"; "sludge metal"; "noise"; "industrial"; "grunge")

The band originally has a more traditional punk style that gradually grown more abrasive and metal-influenced, moving into metalcore territory by the release of their 2012 debut album Love Is Love/Return to Dust. In a review of their 2014 second album I Am King, Ryan Bray of Consequence placed them within the "American metalcore underground" and noted that their music stood out in exhibiting influences not just from hardcore and metal but also from indie rock, post-punk and shoegaze. In 2015, Brian Leak of Alternative Press celebrated Code Orange as being "at the top of their game, not to mention the hardcore scene".

In reference to their 2017 third album Forever, Lars Gotrich of All Songs Considered described their style as "nightmarishly chaotic hardcore", stating that "there's always been an experimental underpinning to Code Orange that toys with noise and melody (and some '90s grunge)."

According to Scott Tady of Kill Your Stereo, "Code Orange takes...hardcore/metalcore and bleeds them over with modern industrial and bleak electronics, with the occasional alternative-rock detour...creating an almost-experimental sound that's both familiar yet futuristic."

The band has also used elements of electronica, industrial, groove metal, and hip-hop. They cite Disembodied, Martyr A.D, Deadguy, Morbid Angel, Hatebreed, Converge, Pantera, Sepultura, Fear Factory, Deftones, Nine Inch Nails, Depeche Mode, Earth Crisis, Minor Threat, Black Flag Ministry, Type O Negative Chapterhouse, Ride, My Bloody Valentine, Nirvana, Alice in Chains, and the Smashing Pumpkins as influences.

== Band members ==
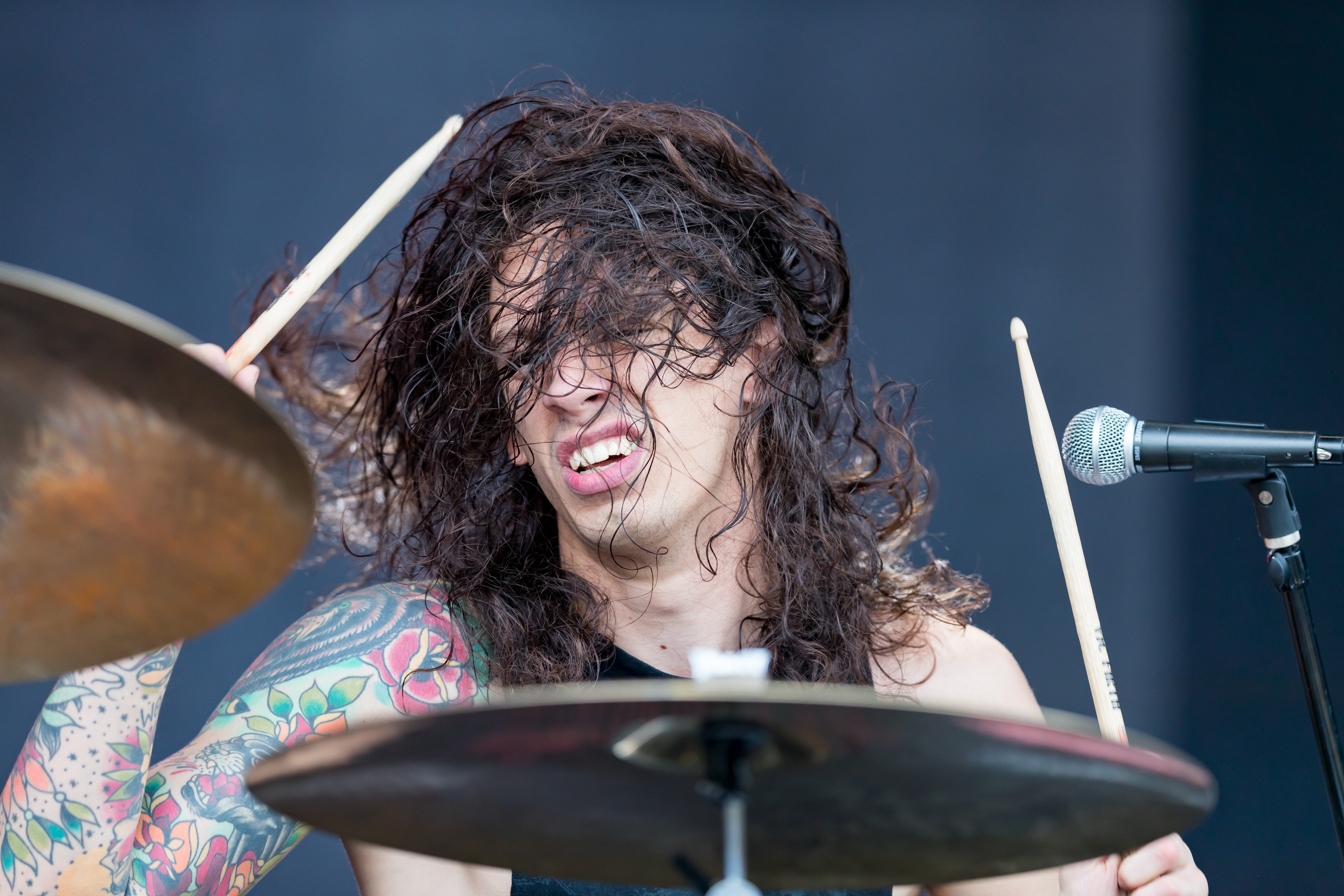
Jami Morgan

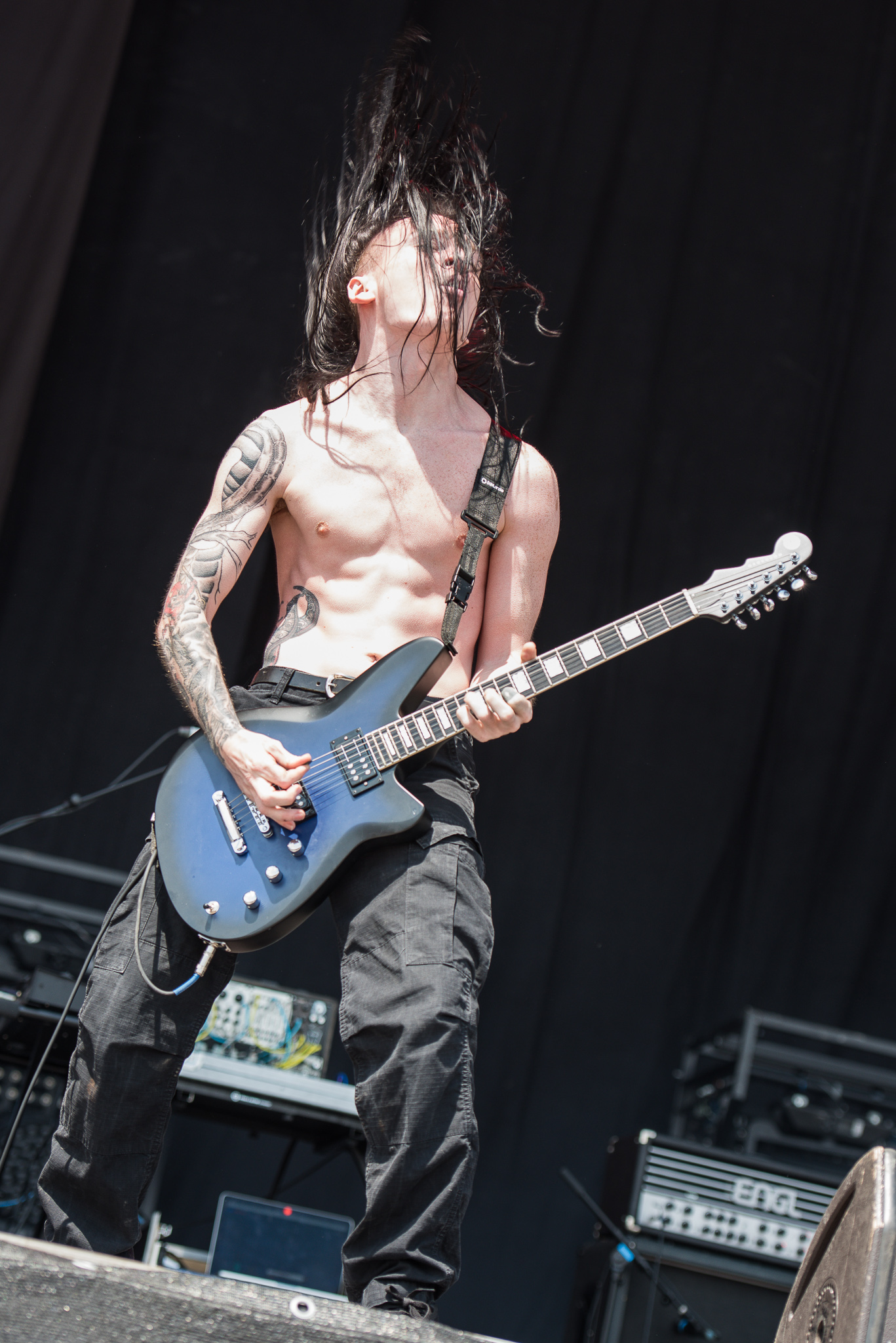
Eric Balderose

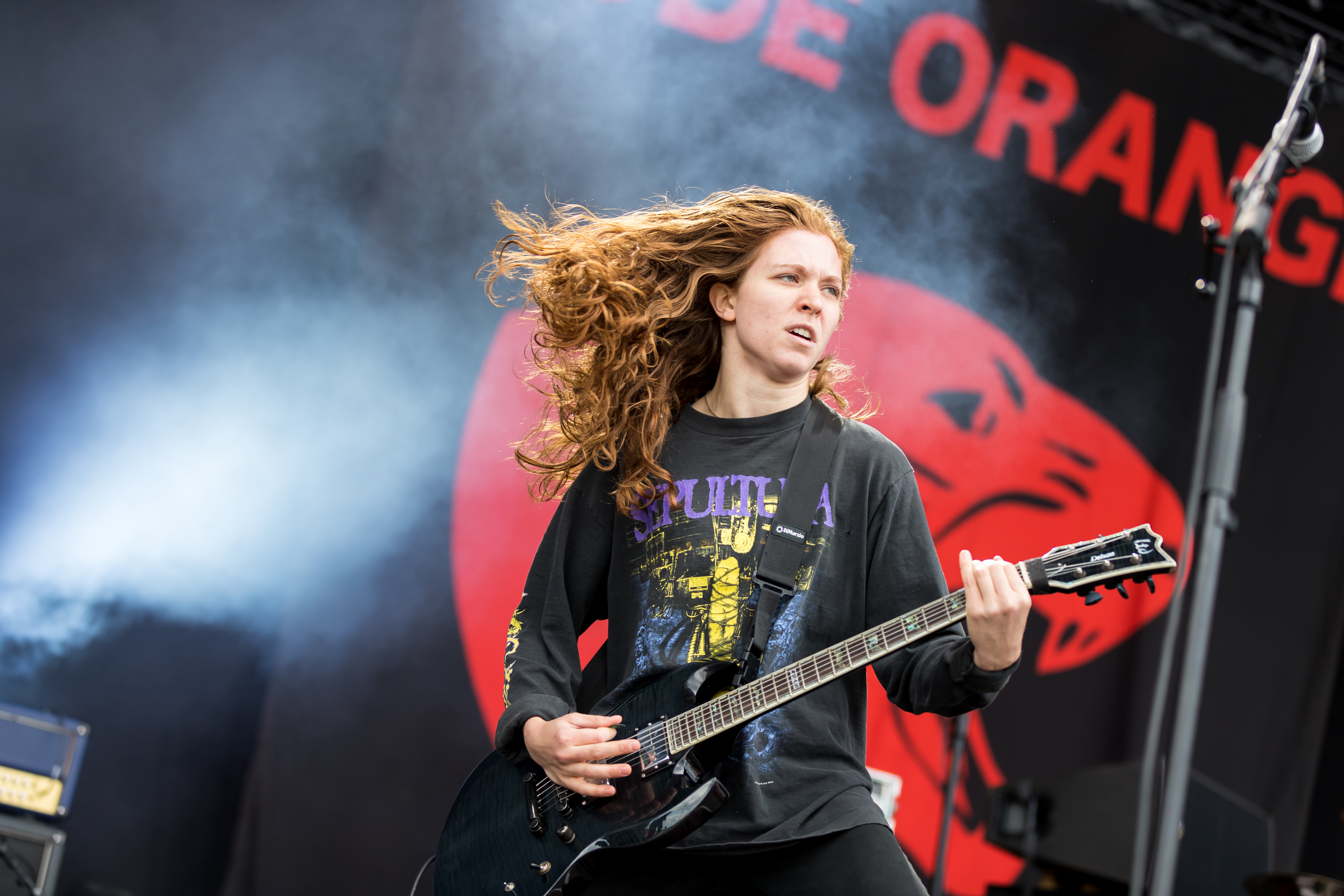
Reba Meyers

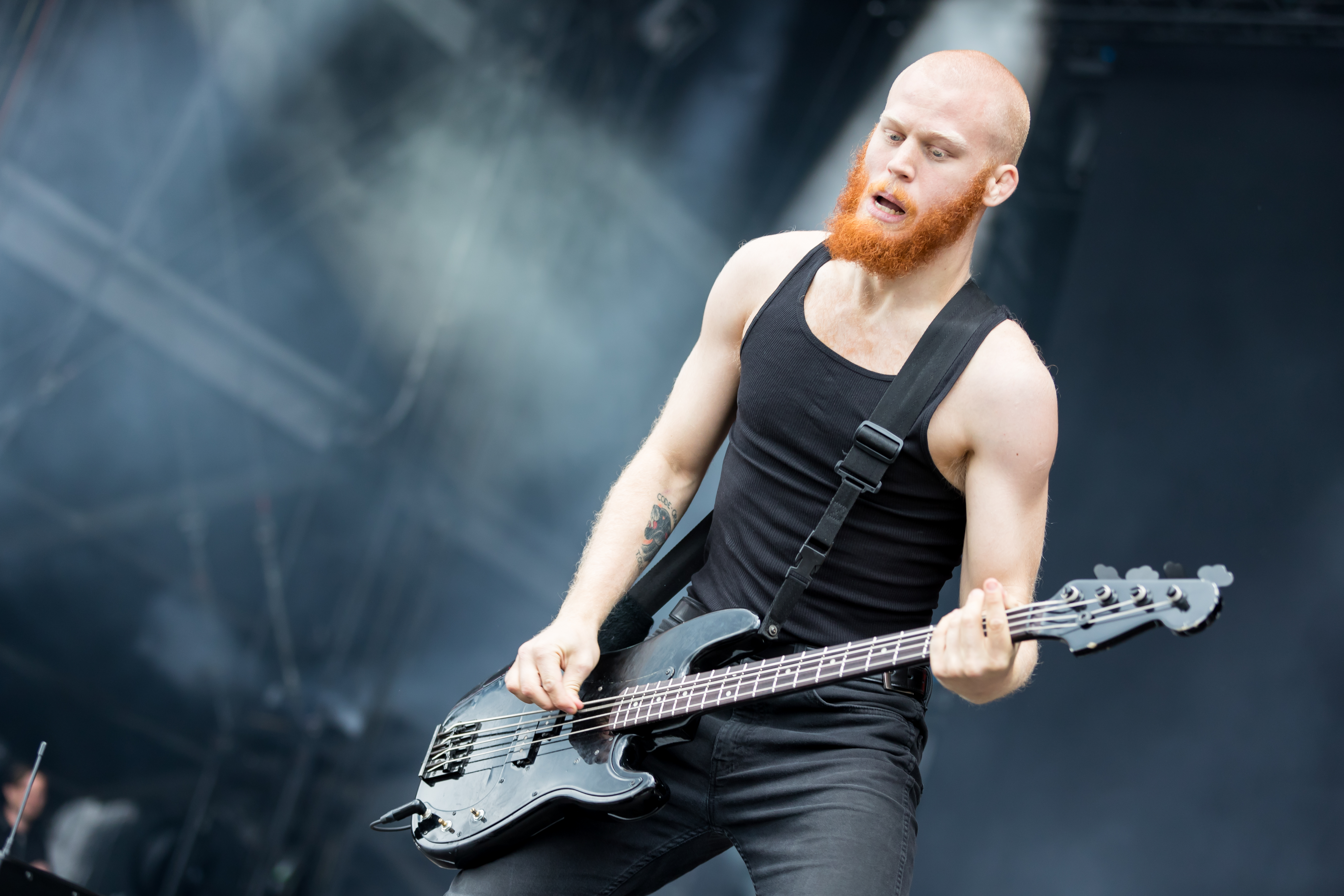
Joe Goldman

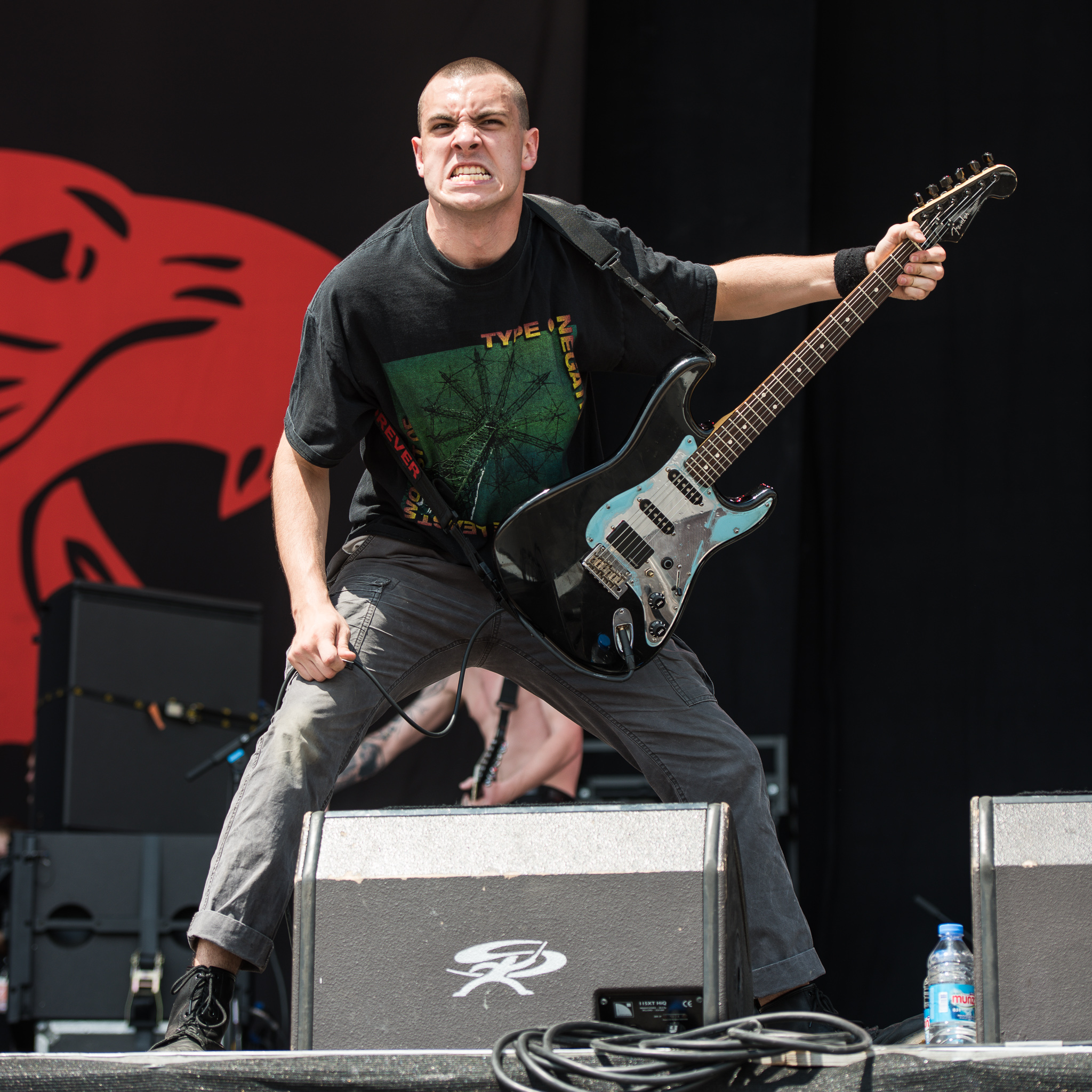
Dominic Landolina

Final line-up

- Jami Morgan – lead vocals (2008–2025), drums (2008–2023 in studio; 2008–2020 live), occasional guitar (2023–2025)
- Eric "Shade" Balderose – keyboards, programming, electronic percussion, lead vocals (2016–2025), guitar, backing vocals (2008–2025)
- Reba Meyers – guitar (2011–2025), bass (2008–2011), backing vocals (2008–2025), lead vocals (2016–2025)
- Joe Goldman – bass (2011–2025), backing vocals (2011–2014)
- Dominic Landolina – guitar, backing vocals (2017–2025)
- Max Portnoy – drums (2023–2025; touring musician 2021–2023)

Former members

- Greg Kern – guitar (2008–2010)
- Bob Rizzo – guitar (2010–2011)

Former touring musicians

- Ethan Young – drums (2020–2021)

== Discography ==
Studio albums

- Love Is Love/Return to Dust (as Code Orange Kids) (2012)
- I Am King (2014)
- Forever (2017)
- Underneath (2020)
- The Above (2023)

== Awards and nominations ==
Loudwire Music Awards

Year	Nominee / work	Award	Result	Ref.
2017	Forever	Metal Album of the Year	Nominated	
2017	Code Orange	Metal Artist of the Year	Nominated	

Grammy Awards

Year	Nominee / work	Award	Result	Ref.
2018	Forever	Best Metal Performance	Nominated	
2021	Underneath	Best Metal Performance	Nominated	

Metal Hammer Golden Gods Awards

Year	Nominee / work	Award	Result	Ref.
2017	Code Orange	Breakthrough	Nominated	
2018	Code Orange	Breakthrough	Won	

Kerrang! Awards

Year	Nominee / work	Award	Result	Ref.
2018	Code Orange	Best International Breakthrough	Won	
2022	Code Orange	Best International Act	Nominated	
