= Adventures (band) =

American rock band

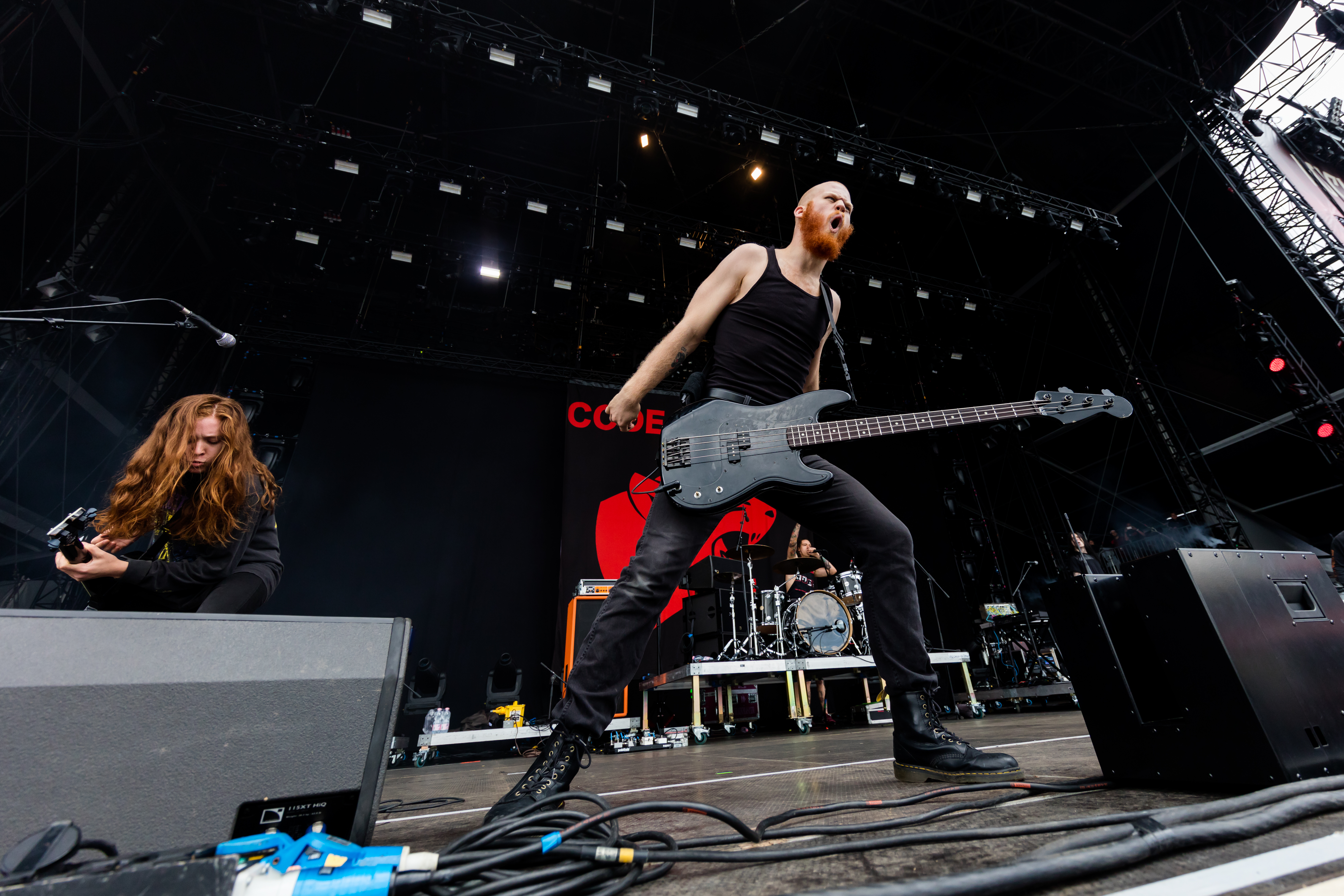
- Code Orange during Rock am Ring at Nürburgring, Nürburg, Rheinland Pfalz, Germany on 2017-06-04,

Background information
- Origin: Pittsburgh, Pennsylvania, U.S.
- Genres: Alternative rock; indie rock; emo
- Years active: 2012–2016
- Labels: Run for Cover; No Sleep
- Spinoff of: Code Orange
- Past members: Joe Goldman; Kimi Hanauer; Dominic Landolina; Reba Meyers; Jami Morgan
- Website: adventurespgh.bandcamp.com

Adventures was an American rock band from Pittsburgh, Pennsylvania. It was formed in 2012 by three members of the hardcore punk band Code Orange – Joe Goldman, Reba Meyers and Jami Morgan – with their friends Kimi Hanauer and Dominic Landolina (now also a member of Code Orange). They were initially signed to No Sleep Records, but later transferred to Run for Cover Records.

Adventures have released four EPs, followed by the 2015 studio album Supersonic Home.

== History ==
In May 2014, the band embarked on a tour with Seahaven and Foxing.

On March 5, 2015, the band played Hostage Calm's final show at Toad's Place in New Haven, CT alongside TWIABP, Superheaven, and Sorority Noise. In April, the band embarked on a US tour supporting Whirr. On April 7, 2015, the band played their Supersonic Home record release show at Roboto in Pittsburgh, PA with support from Whirr, Give, Run Forever, and Swingers Club. In August, the band played Wrecking Ball Fest in Atlanta, GA. Following this, the band embarked on a US tour supporting Basement alongside LVL UP and Palehound.

On August 30, 2016, the band implied their break-up by tweeting the emojis of a sad face, a gun, and a peace sign.

== Members ==
- Joe Goldman – bass, backing vocals (2012–2016)
- Kimi Hanauer – keyboards, backing vocals (2012–2016)
- Dominic Landolina – guitar (2012–2016)
- Reba Meyers – lead vocals, guitar (2012–2016)
- Jami Morgan – drums (2012–2016)

== Discography ==
=== Studio albums ===
- Supersonic Home (Run for Cover Records, 2015)

=== EPs ===
- Adventures (No Sleep Records, 2012)
- Clear My Head with You (No Sleep Records, 2013)

=== Splits ===
- Adventures / Run, Forever (No Sleep Records, 2014)
- Adventures / Pity Sex (Run for Cover Records, 2014)
