= Brave Bird =

- Origin: Ann Arbor, Michigan
- Genres: Midwest emo; math rock
- Years active: 2011–2014
- Labels: Count Your Lucky Stars
- Website: www.facebook.com/bravebirdmi

Brave Bird was an American emo band from Ann Arbor, Michigan.

== History ==
Brave Bird began in 2011 with the release of a split with the band Pity Sex. In 2012, Brave Bird signed to Count Your Lucky Stars Records. In 2013, Brave Bird released their first and only full-length album titled Maybe You, No One Else Worth It on Count Your Lucky Stars Records. In 2014, Brave Bird released a 10" titled T Minus Grand Gesture on Count Your Lucky Stars Records.

== Discography ==
Studio albums

- Maybe You, No One Else Worth It (2013, Count Your Lucky Stars)

EPs

- Brave Bird/Pity Sex – Split (2011, self-released)
- T Minus Grand Gesture (2014, Count Your Lucky Stars)
