= Under the Skin (Code Orange album) =

Live album by Code Orange
- Released: September 4, 2020
- Recorded: July 30, 2020
- Venue: Theatre Factory in Pittsburgh, Pennsylvania
- Genre: Acoustic; grunge; electronic
- Length: 43:12
- Label: Roadrunner

Code Orange chronology
| Underneath (2020) | Under the Skin (2020) | The Above (2023) |

Code Orange video chronology
| Last Ones Left: In Fear of the End (2020) | Under the Skin (2020) |

Under the Skin is a live album by American hardcore punk band Code Orange, released on September 4, 2020 through Roadrunner Records. Under the Skin was recorded at the Theatre Factory in Pittsburgh, Pennsylvania on July 30, 2020. The album features acoustic versions of some of the band's songs as well as a cover of Alice in Chains' "Down in a Hole".

== Background and release ==
Under the Skin was recorded at the Theatre Factory in Pittsburgh, Pennsylvania on July 30, 2020. The album follows a similar format to MTV Unplugged. The album was first broadcast live via Twitch. The album was released on September 4, 2020. The album featured acoustic renditions of songs from the bands discography, as well as a cover of "Down in a Hole" by Alice In Chains.

== Composition ==
The album features acoustic renditions of songs from the bands discography along with electronic backdops. The album Kerrang! considers the album to "[hark] back to grunge's glory-days while loading on electronic motifs." They even called the rendition of "Autumn & Carbine" a "twangy electro-country nightmare." The band utilizes electronic ambience and strings on the rendition of "Sulfur Surrounding".

== Reception ==
Professional ratings
Review scores
| Source | Rating |
|---|---|
| Dead Press | 2/10 stars |
| Distorted Sound | 10/10 |
| Kerrang! | 4/5 |
| Metal Hammer | 4/5 stars |
| Rock Sins | 10/10 |

Under the Skin was met with mostly positive reviews. Jack Fermor-Worrell of Distorted Sound praised the album stating, "Under The Skin is yet another astonishing notch for Code Orange to add to their belt, and further affirmation that this is a collective willing and indeed more than able to go just about anywhere with their sound." Sam Law of Kerrang! complemented the stipped won performances of the album calling the performances "even more powerful."

Stephen Hill of Metal Hammer called the album "a showcase for why they are head and shoulders above their peers." Simon Crampton of Rock Sins praised the stripped down nature of the album stating, "they managed to strip down their songs and still manage to make them sound heavy, it's just a different type of heavy, one wraught with emotions and goose bump inducing atmosphere."

Tess Hofer of Dead Press was more critical of the album, "though certainly offering a different and unheard side of Code Orange, along with allowing to shed and expose what composes the menace of their work, 'Under The Skin' is an idea better in theory than in practice. For Code Orange, less is less and more is more."

== Track listing ==
Under the Skin track listing
| No. | Title | Length |
|---|---|---|
| 1. | "Bleeding in the Blur (Acoustic)" | 4:47 |
| 2. | "Who I Am (Acoustic)" | 4:10 |
| 3. | "Autumn & Carbine (Acoustic)" | 3:28 |
| 4. | "(Bugs)" | 0:24 |
| 5. | "Ugly (Acoustic)" | 3:17 |
| 6. | "Only One Way (Acoustic)" | 3:42 |
| 7. | "(Quarantine)" | 1:12 |
| 8. | "Down in a Hole" (Alice in Chains cover) | 5:29 |
| 9. | "(Peace)" | 0:28 |
| 10. | "Dreams 1 + 2" | 4:44 |
| 11. | "(Dr3am)" | 0:53 |
| 12. | "Sulfur Surrounding (Acoustic)" | 3:54 |
| 13. | "Under the Skin" | 2:41 |
| 14. | "Hurt3" | 4:03 |
| Total length: | | 43:12 |
