= Underneath (Code Orange album) =

Studio album by Code Orange
- Released: March 13, 2020
- Genres: Metalcore; industrial metal; hardcore punk; alternative rock; alternative metal
- Length: 47:33
- Label: Roadrunner
- Producers: Jami Morgan; Nick Raskulinecz; Will Yip

Code Orange chronology
Forever (2017)	Underneath (2020)	Under the Skin (2020)

Singles from Underneath
- 1. "Underneath" Released: January 10, 2020; 2. "Swallowing the Rabbit Whole" Released: February 7, 2020; 3. "Sulfur Surrounding" Released: March 9, 2020

Underneath is the fourth studio album by American hardcore punk band Code Orange, released on March 13, 2020 through Roadrunner Records. It is their first album to be produced by Nick Raskulinecz. The album was also produced by Jami Morgan and Will Yip. It was preceded by three singles: "Underneath", "Swallowing the Rabbit Whole", and "Sulfur Surrounding". The album continues the band's metalcore and hardcore punk sound with a heavier emphasis on industrial and electronic elements. The album received critical acclaim with critics praising the use of glitches, electronics, and overall production.

== Background and recording ==
Frontman Jami Morgan said that the album "was a 24-hour-a-day obsession for us for about two years". This led Code Orange to cancel a European tour cycle in 2019, including an appearance at England's Bloodstock Open Air, in order to focus solely on writing and recording. The band reached out to prolific producer and musician Chris Vrenna through the album's producer Nick Raskulinecz, who helped Eric Balderose in the electronics, the arrangement of the many layers of production and the use of white noise. The album was also produced by Jami Morgan and co-produced by Will Yip. Yip also helped produce the band's previous album. Reba Meyers had to readapt her guitar work to imitate electronic instruments, and she also recorded many unusual sounds which they mixed with samples, making a "bank of" them used in different songs. Morgan further commented that writing Underneath "was like a factory… everyone [was] working towards this goal."

While making the album, Morgan regularly talked to and sent material of Underneath to his friend Greg Puciato of the Dillinger Escape Plan and the Black Queen, who gave him feedback on it. The singer was one of the first people to hear the record, and Morgan called him a "mentor".

== Composition ==
Musically, Underneath has been described as metalcore, industrial metal, hardcore punk, alternative rock, alternative metal, grunge, nu metal, industrial hardcore, industrial, metallic hardcore, screamo, thrash metal, sludge metal, math rock, and classic rock. The album utilizes pauses, glitches, distorted screams, and static.

== Release ==
On December 19, 2019, Code Orange launched whatisreallyunderneath.com, a website that presented visitors with an interactive panoramic photo. The band released music videos directed by Max Moore for the title song "Underneath" on January 10, 2020 and for the song "Swallowing the Rabbit Whole" on February 7, 2020. The third single, "Sulfur Surrounding", with a video animated and directed by the band's Eric Balderose, was released on March 9. The album was released on March 13, 2020. On March 14, 2020, Code Orange performed a live streamed album release concert in an empty venue on Twitch due to the COVID-19 pandemic. The performance took place at the Roxian Theatre and was called "Last Ones Left: In Fear of the End". The performance was later officially released on YouTube.

On June 7, they performed "Underneath" at NXT TakeOver: In Your House as it was the official theme song. On January 23, 2021, an animated motion-capture video for the song "Autumn and Carbine" was premiered on Adult Swim's Toonami. The video was directed by Eric Balderose and Jami Morgan and utilized motion-capture to create 3D models of the band members themselves.

== Critical reception ==
Professional ratings
Aggregate scores
Source	Rating
AnyDecentMusic?	8.0/10
Metacritic	84/100
Review scores
Source	Rating
Clash	9/10
Consequence	A
Exclaim!	7/10
The Guardian	5/5 stars
The Independent	4/5 stars
Kerrang!	5/5 stars
Metal Hammer	5/5 stars
MetalSucks	4/5 stars
NME	4/5 stars
Pitchfork	4.5/10

Underneath was met with critical acclaim. At Metacritic, which assigns a normalized rating out of 100 to reviews from mainstream publications, the album received an average score of 84, which indicates "universal acclaim", based on 11 reviews. The record also received an average score of 8.0 from AnyDecentMusic?, normalized rating out of 9.

Clash critic John Gray described the record as "practically a horror movie in audio form", stating that the "sheer, clear-eyed ambition they exhibit in pursuing the impossible is compelling enough to make Underneath an absolute must-hear for anyone who dares to dream differently." Consequence of Sound's Joseph Schafer thought that the record "delivers on every promise in a sleek, incredibly catchy package and does it all in under 50 minutes." Reviewing for Exclaim!, Connor Atkinson noted: "Code Orange usher in a new era with Underneath that will alienate sections of their audience, and bring their us-against-you might to places no Pittsburgh band have gone before." Ben Beaumont-Thomas of The Guardian wrote: "In rock, technical brilliance can sometimes impede immediacy, but Code Orange use it to achieve total and thrilling omnipotence. They are a reminder that visionary music never wears a genre tag."

The Independent's Roisin O'Connor described the album as "a glitchy, industrial wasteland". Nick Ruskell of Kerrang! called the album "one of the most powerful, cathartic, creatively satisfying and bruisingly heavy records of its age."

The album received a rare perfect score from Metal Hammer. In the review Stephen Hill stated, "It's not always easy to define a 'perfect' record, but you have to ask yourself what you want from a heavy band in 2020. Innovation? Ambition? Power? Something anthemic? Something that stops heavy music from chasing its tail and genuinely moves it forward?" Axl Rosenberg of MetalSucks called Underneath "the band's most satisfying release to date". Dannii Leivers of NME was positive about the album "You never know quite what's about to happen, but no matter which sonic mask the band slip on, they sound terrifyingly comfortable wearing it. This unpredictability is what makes Code Orange and 'Underneath' such a thrilling listen."

Grayson Haver Currin of Pitchfork was less positive and called Underneath "an overstuffed album of weak modern-rock imitations."

=== Accolades ===
Accolades for Underneath
Publication	Accolade	Rank	Ref.
Metal Hammer	The 50 Best Metal Albums of 2020	3	
NPR	The 50 Best Albums of 2020	18	
Rolling Stone	Rolling Stone's 50 Best Albums of 2020 – Mid-Year	—N/a	
Stereogum	Stereogum's 50 Best Albums of 2020 – Mid-Year	40	

Awards and nominations
Year	Award	Work	Category	Result	Ref.
2021	Grammy Awards	"Underneath"	Best Metal Performance	Nominated	

== Track listing ==
All lyrics are written by Jami Morgan; all music is composed by Code Orange.

No.	Title	Length
1.	"(deeperthanbefore)"	1:13
2.	"Swallowing the Rabbit Whole"	3:47
3.	"In Fear"	3:21
4.	"You and You Alone"	3:06
5.	"Who I Am"	3:46
6.	"Cold.Metal.Place"	3:04
7.	"Sulfur Surrounding"	3:47
8.	"The Easy Way"	4:25
9.	"Erasure Scan"	2:32
10.	"Last Ones Left"	3:08
11.	"Autumn and Carbine"	3:27
12.	"Back Inside the Glass"	2:34
13.	"A Sliver"	4:37
14.	"Underneath"	4:41
Total length:		47:26

Japan bonus track
No.	Title	Length
15.	"The Cutter"	3:23
Total length:		50:58

== Personnel ==
Credits for Underneath

Code Orange

- Eric "Shade" Balderose – programming, vocals, mixing
- Reba Meyers – guitars, vocals, engineering
- Jami Morgan –drums, vocals, producer
- Joe Goldman – bass
- Dominic Landolina – guitars, vocals

Additional musicians

- Nicole Dollanganger – additional vocals on "(deeperthanbefore)", "Swallowing The Rabbit Hole", "Cold.Metal.Place"
- Chris Vrenna – additional programming

Production

- Nick Raskulinecz – producer
- Will Yip – co-producer, mixing, engineering
- Andrew Dawson – mixing on "Underneath"
- Vince Ratti – co-mixing
- Nathan Yarborough – engineering
- Vlado Meller – mastering
- Dave Rath – A&R

Visual art

- Setta Studio – visual producer, visual effects, additional enhancement
- Autumn Morgan – art concept
- Elizabeth Farrington – assist
- Mandy Simpson – assist
- Jason Baker – props and makeup
- Virgilio Tzaj – layout
- Tim Saccenti – photographer
- Joe Gerardi – retouching

== Charts ==
Chart performance for Underneath
Chart (2020)	Peak position
Belgian Albums (Ultratop Wallonia)	161
German Albums (Offizielle Top 100)	80
Portuguese Albums (AFP)	27
Scottish Albums (Official Charts)	18
Spanish Albums (PROMUSICAE)	56
UK Albums (Official Charts)	90
UK Rock & Metal Albums (OCC)	1
US Billboard 200	155
US Indie Store Album Sales (Billboard)	2
US Top Hard Rock Albums (Billboard)	6
