= Phantom Limb (Alice in Chains song) =

Song by Alice in Chains

Song by Alice in Chains

from the album The Devil Put Dinosaurs Here
- Released: March 25, 2013 (radio); May 28, 2013 (album)
- Recorded: July 2011 – December 2012
- Studio: Henson Recording Studios; Los Angeles, California
- Genre: Heavy metal; doom metal
- Length: 7:07
- Label: Capitol
- Composer(s): William DuVall, Jerry Cantrell, Sean Kinney, Mike Inez
- Lyricist(s): William DuVall
- Producer(s): Nick Raskulinecz, Alice in Chains

"Phantom Limb" is a song by the American rock band Alice in Chains and the tenth track on their fifth studio album, The Devil Put Dinosaurs Here (2013). The lyrics were written by Alice in Chains' co-lead vocalist and rhythm guitarist William DuVall, who also played the guitar solo in the song, the first solo he wrote for Alice in Chains. The song premiered on radio via Seattle station KISW on March 25, 2013.

Snippets of "Phantom Limb" were featured on the Alice in Chains mockumentary AIC 23, released on April 3, 2013. A music video was released for the song on October 28, 2014 via BitTorrent Bundle.

== Origin and recording ==
Songwriter and Alice in Chains' co-lead vocalist and rhythm guitarist William DuVall explained the song to Recoil magazine in April 2014:

They [the other members of Alice in Chains] sent the basic, sort of bare bones demo of the musical idea, and that was one where we were actually separated. They were in L.A. and I was in Atlanta at the time, and they sent the track, and I just listened to it, and immediately some things started forming in my mind, and I just got this idea of a person that was trapped under something, like maybe someone who had been in an avalanche or an earthquake or something where you’re trapped under rubble, or you’re looking up through something trying to get to the surface of something and I just kind of ran with it. And within about 24 hours or so, I had the whole thing. I had written it and sang it in my little home studio. So the vocal arrangement and all that stuff you hear, that all came together at home, and I tracked it just like that and sent it back, and they were like, ‘Yeah! Wow!’ There was no guitar solo on it at that time, on the demo. So we got the guitar solo together in demo form, and then later when we were tracking it at Henson Studios in L.A., Cantrell just asked me, ‘Man, do you want to play guitar solo on that? I don’t really have anything.’ So it was a similar thing. The day came, and I just took a couple minutes, I had a basic idea of where I was going to start, and I had a basic idea of where I was going to end, and I just went in and within about a half an hour it was done. [Laughs] I plugged my number one Les Paul into one of the Friedman Marshall amps, and that was that.

== Live performances ==
Alice in Chains performed "Phantom Limb" for the first time during their concert at the Eagles Ballroom in Milwaukee on May 15, 2013.

== Music video ==
The music video was directed by Robert Schober, also known as Roboshobo, who also directed the music videos for Alice in Chains' songs "Hollow", "Stone" and "Voices". The video premiered exclusively on BitTorrent Bundle on October 28, 2014, and was available for free streaming and download. The bundle also included the video treatment and the shot list in PDF, as well as access to the band's merch.

The video does not feature the band. It tells the story of two men – one older, one younger – pitted against each other. The younger man forces his way into the house of the older man and begins to assault him. The video ends with a supernatural twist.

== Personnel ==
- William DuVall – lead vocals, lead guitar
- Jerry Cantrell – backing vocals, rhythm guitar
- Mike Inez – bass guitar
- Sean Kinney – drums
