= Alice in Chains: AIC 23 =

2013 mockumentary short film

AIC 23
- Directed by: Peter Darley Miller
- Written by: Jerry Cantrell; Peter Darley Miller; W. Earl Brown
- Produced by: Jennifer Amerine; Melissa Larson
- Starring: Jerry Cantrell; William DuVall; Mike Inez; Sean Kinney; W. Earl Brown
- Production company: RadicalMedia
- Distributed by: Funny or Die
- Release date: April 3, 2013
- Running time: 10 minutes
- Country: United States
- Language: English

AIC 23 (also known as Alice in Chains Twenty-Three) is a 2013 mockumentary by American rock band Alice in Chains to promote their fifth studio album, The Devil Put Dinosaurs Here. The screenplay was co-written by guitarist/vocalist Jerry Cantrell, director Peter Darley Miller, and actor W. Earl Brown. The video premiered on Funny or Die on April 3, 2013. The title is a spoof of Pearl Jam's documentary Pearl Jam Twenty (2011).

Snippets of songs from The Devil Put Dinosaurs Here are featured in the film, such as the first two singles, "Hollow" and "Stone", and two songs that had not been made available before the album was released: "Voices" and "Phantom Limb".

== Synopsis ==
AIC 23 follows film studies professor Alan Poole McLard on his journey to make a documentary about Alice in Chains. McLard interviews other musicians who have been influenced by the band. Among them are country singer Donnie "Skeeter" Dollarhide Jr. (played by guitarist/vocalist Jerry Cantrell), reggae singer Nesta Cleveland (played by vocalist William DuVall), black metal musician Unta Gleeben Glabben Globben Globin (played by bassist Mike Inez), and hipster blogger Stanley Eisen (played by drummer Sean Kinney).

== Cast ==
- W. Earl Brown as Alan Poole McLard
- Sean Kinney as Stanley Eisen
- William DuVall as Nesta Cleveland
- Mike Inez as Unta Gleeben Glabben Globben Globin
- Jerry Cantrell as Donnie "Skeeter" Dollarhide Jr.
- Kim Thayil as himself
- Lars Ulrich as himself
- Robert Trujillo as himself
- Nancy Wilson as herself
- Ann Wilson as herself
- Mike McCready as himself
- Bill Kelliher as himself
- Duff McKagan as himself
- Brent Hinds as himself

== Production ==
Alice in Chains' guitarist and vocalist Jerry Cantrell told Loudwire that the idea for AIC 23 came out of five or six conference calls with the band wondering what they would do to promote their new album, The Devil Put Dinosaurs Here. So the members made up their characters and had a loose idea of what they wanted to do, similar to what they did on The Nona Tapes (1995). The band brought up director Peter Darley Miller and actor W. Earl Brown, who is also a friend of Cantrell. Alice in Chains' co-lead vocalist William DuVall stated that the band would rather do anything than a run-of-the-mill promo video, and that's why they decided to do this video.

The script was co-written by Jerry Cantrell and W. Earl Brown. Cantrell revealed that his character is a little bit his dad. Sean Kinney improvised the "cuff" lines and "I was in a band back in the day".

The prosthetic makeup was made by Oscar-winning make-up artist Matthew W. Mungle, who also worked on Edward Scissorhands (1990), Bram Stoker's Dracula (1992) and Schindler's List (1993).

== Release ==
AIC 23 premiered on Funny or Die on April 3, 2013, and was uploaded to Alice in Chains' official YouTube channel two days later.
