= The Devil Put Dinosaurs Here =

Studio album by Alice in Chains
- Released: May 28, 2013
- Recorded: 2012
- Studio: Henson (Hollywood, Los Angeles)
- Genre: Grunge; alternative metal; sludge metal; doom metal
- Length: 67:16
- Label: Capitol
- Producer: Nick Raskulinecz; Alice in Chains

Alice in Chains chronology
Black Gives Way to Blue (2009)	The Devil Put Dinosaurs Here (2013)	Rainier Fog (2018)

Singles from The Devil Put Dinosaurs Here
- 1. "Hollow" Released: December 18, 2012; 2. "Stone" Released: March 25, 2013; 3. "Voices" Released: July 26, 2013

The Devil Put Dinosaurs Here is the fifth studio album by American rock band Alice in Chains, released on May 28, 2013, through Capitol Records, the band's final album released through the label. Following a worldwide tour in support of its previous album, Black Gives Way to Blue (2009), Alice in Chains began work on a new album. The making of The Devil Put Dinosaurs Here lasted for more than a year and the release of the album was delayed numerous times. The band entered the studio in July 2011 to start work on their fifth album. During the writing and recording sessions, guitarist and vocalist Jerry Cantrell underwent shoulder surgery, which resulted in the delay of the album. The recording sessions of The Devil Put Dinosaurs Here were completed in December 2012.

Peaking at No. 2 on the Billboard 200 chart and at No. 1 on the Top Rock Albums chart, the album was well received by music critics, and "Hollow", "Stone", "Voices" were released as singles to promote the album. "Hollow" and "Stone" reached No. 1 on Billboard's Mainstream Rock Tracks, while "Voices" reached No. 3, and each one of the three songs stayed on the chart for 20 weeks. The Devil Put Dinosaurs Here also reached the top ten in the national albums charts of Australia, Finland and Norway. The album was nominated for a Grammy Award for Best Engineered Album, Non-Classical in 2013, and ranked No. 4 on Loudwire's 2019 list of the Best Rock Albums of the Decade. The mockumentary AIC 23 was released via Funny or Die on April 3, 2013, to promote the album.

== Background and recording ==
About seven months after the release of Black Gives Way to Blue, Alice in Chains hinted at the possibility of a fifth studio album when guitarist Jerry Cantrell told MTV News that there were thoughts and did not "see any reason why it wouldn't [happen]." Singer William DuVall also commented on the possibility of the album and Alice in Chains' future, "we've got a lot of water to sail before we do that. There's a lot of shows. But yeah, generally speaking, yeah, we're excited about the future. I don't anticipate some long layoff."

DuVall revealed in September 2010 that Alice in Chains had not begun writing their next album yet, but "there's plenty of riffs flying around." He added, "That was the case when we first started back up. We would just stockpile these fragments, and then some time later we would sift through the mountain of stuff, and that's what became Black Gives Way to Blue. The same thing has been happening since we've been touring Black Gives Way to Blue, so it would be only natural to at some point say, 'Hey, we've got a lot of stuff. Let's sift through and see what we've got this time.'" DuVall also mentioned that it was possible that the album would feature songs that were written for Black Gives Way to Blue.

On March 21, 2011, Metal Hammer reported that Alice in Chains would begin recording their new album by the end of 2011. In July 2011, Alice in Chains began working on the new album at Los Angeles' Henson Recording Studios. In May 2012, Cantrell revealed that prior to the recording sessions, he had surgery in his right shoulder. He explained, "The thing that set me back is I had some bone spurs [and] cartilage issues in my shoulders. I had the same issue in the other shoulder about six years ago so I've had them both done now. It's a repetitive motion injury from playing." Cantrell could not play guitar for eight months while he was recovering from surgery. While recuperating at home in a sling, Cantrell heard a riff in his head and sang it into his phone. The riff later became the song "Stone". Cantrell returned to the studio to finish the album in early 2012. The band selected Nick Raskulinecz, who produced their previous record Black Gives Way to Blue, to helm the new album. In December 2012, Cantrell confirmed that the album was completed.

On the making of the album, Cantrell said to Revolver magazine: "I don't think you'll be surprised by anything you hear. ... It's us. But it's also really unique. It's got all the elements of any record we've put out, but it's unlike any record we've put out. Basically, it's the next chapter in the Alice in Chains book, and it's going to be a big one." Cantrell also said to Guitar World: "In my opinion, Black Gives Way to Blue stood up to anything else we've put out in our career. Hopefully, the new album will connect with people in the same way."

== Promotion and AIC 23 ==
On February 13, 2013, Alice in Chains posted on Facebook that their new album title would be an anagram of the letters H V L E N T P S U S D A H I E E O E D T I U R R, and asked fans to decode the anagram. The next day they announced that the album would be called The Devil Put Dinosaurs Here. The song titles were revealed in the March 2013 issue of Revolver.

To help promote the album, Alice in Chains teamed up with Funny or Die for an 11-minute mockumentary titled AIC 23, in which Film Studies professor Alan Poole McLard (played by W. Earl Brown) attempts to make a documentary on Alice in Chains without any help from the actual band, interviewing other musicians instead. Among them are country singer Donnie 'Skeeter' Dollarhide Jr. (played by Cantrell), reggae singer Nesta Cleveland (played by DuVall), black metal musician Unta Gleeben Glabben Globben Globin (played by bassist Mike Inez), and the hipster Stanley Eisen (played by drummer Sean Kinney). Snippets of the album's tracks were played in the short film. The video was released on April 3, 2013, and also features cameos by Ann and Nancy Wilson from Heart, Mike McCready from Pearl Jam, Kim Thayil from Soundgarden, Duff McKagan from Guns N' Roses, Brent Hinds and Bill Kelliher from Mastodon, and Lars Ulrich and Robert Trujillo from Metallica.

A limited edition of Jerry Cantrell's signature Dunlop Cry Baby Wah pedal was made available as a tribute to the album. It features the cover artwork for The Devil Put Dinosaurs Here, and the lyrics to "Stone" printed on the bottom plate.

== Music and lyrics ==
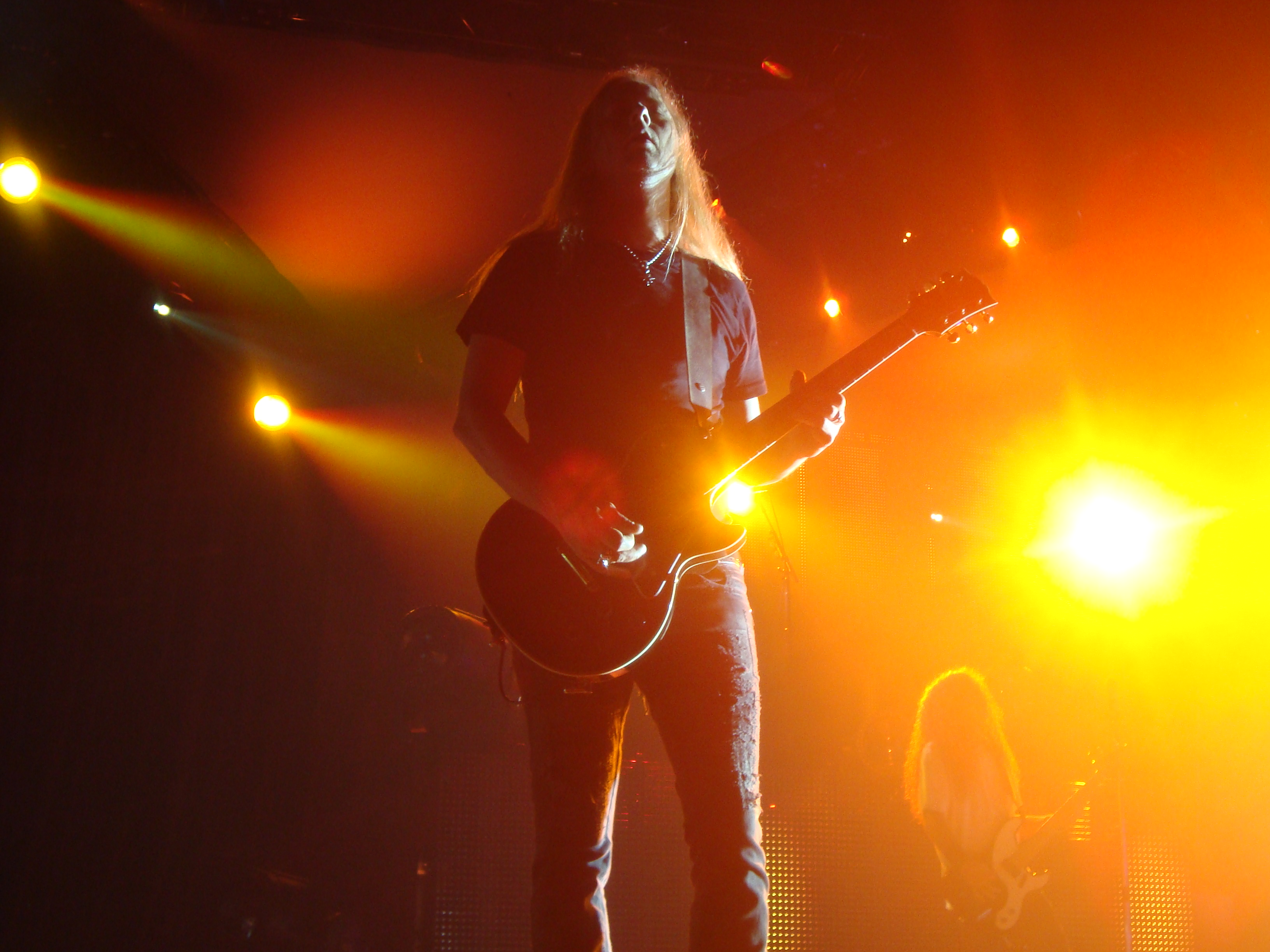
Regarding the album, Jerry Cantrell has stated "there's some real filth in there".

Jerry Cantrell stated in an interview with Rolling Stone, "We made a unique record that's completely different from anything we ever did. It encapsulates a period of time, like all records do. You see growth and that the band is moving ahead in new territory that we haven't been to before, but we haven't lost our identity."

Cantrell also stated "There's some real filth in there. That's intentional, and that's also just how we sound together. We're trying to make a record that we dig and we're trying to keep the bar high for ourselves and see if we can get past it, and I think that we did again. And of course you want people to dig it too and to respond to it, and to have that start happening is satisfying."

According to Cantrell, the album title refers to the hypocrisy within organized religion, with "overwhelming evidence that things aren't working right now. We need to start growing up as a people. When you're teaching people that being gay is a mortal sin, yet a good portion of the people teaching this are raping kids, there's a huge problem".

For the lyrics, Jerry Cantrell stated: "The devil put dinosaurs here / Jesus don't like a queer / No problem with faith / Just fear," which appear in the title track. "What's the old joke?" Cantrell said. "There are two things you never want to get into a conversation or argument about: politics and religion. But fuck, I guess we're going to be talking about this for awhile."

William DuVall wrote the lyrics and the guitar solo for "Phantom Limb". DuVall said about the lyrics: "I just got this idea of a person that was trapped under something, like maybe someone who had been in an avalanche or an earthquake or something where you're trapped under rubble, or you're looking up through something trying to get to the surface of something and I just kind of ran with it."

== Artwork ==
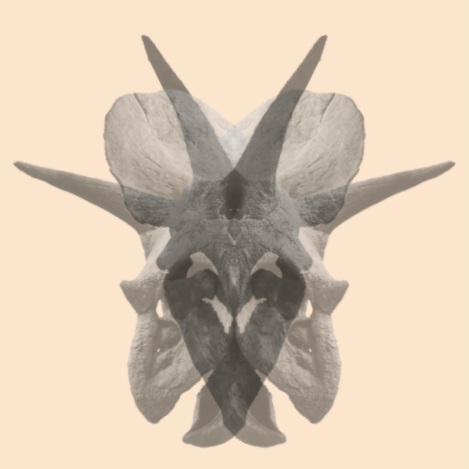

The cover artwork features the skull of a Triceratops with a second skull image steganographically hidden on a red background. The two skulls, when revealed, combine to form the image of the devil. The album title refers to a belief held by some religious individuals that to confuse the masses of humanity, Satan himself planted dinosaur bones deep into the Earth to dissuade the faithful.

The inner artwork includes images of other dinosaur skulls steganographically overlapped in a similar manner to the front cover, including two pachycephalosaurs and Ankylosaurus. Additional imagery is also revealed when the CD tray is removed from the jewel case.

== Music videos ==
Much like the previous album Black Gives Way to Blue, Alice in Chains released five music videos in support of The Devil Put Dinosaurs Here. In January 2013, the band released the music video for the single "Hollow", and the music video for "Stone" was released in April 2013. Music videos for "Voices", and "The Devil Put Dinosaurs Here" were released on YouTube in September 2013 to further promote the album. In October 2014, the band released the music video for the song "Phantom Limb" via BitTorrent Bundle. Three of the videos ("Hollow", "The Devil Put Dinosaurs Here", and "Phantom Limb") do not feature the band in any way.

== Release ==
The album's first single, "Hollow", debuted online on December 18, 2012, through a lyric video posted on YouTube. The single was available for digital download on January 8, 2013, along with an official music video. "Hollow" spent 5 weeks at No. 1 on Billboard's Mainstream Rock Tracks chart.

The second single, "Stone", was released to radio stations on March 25, 2013, and spent 3 weeks at No. 1 on the Mainstream Rock chart. The song "Phantom Limb" premiered on radio through Seattle station KISW on March 25, 2013.

The third single, "Voices", premiered on USA Today website on July 26, 2013, and was released to radio stations on July 29, 2013. It peaked at No. 3 on Billboard's Mainstream Rock Tracks and stayed on the chart for 20 weeks.

The album was originally scheduled to be released on May 14, 2013, but the release was postponed to May 28, 2013. It was released through Capitol Records on CD, vinyl and as a digital download.

== Critical reception ==
Professional ratings
Aggregate scores
Source	Rating
Metacritic	70/100
Review scores
Source	Rating
AllMusic	3/5 stars
The A.V. Club	B−
The Independent	3/5 stars
Loudwire	4.5/5 stars
Melodic	3.5/5 stars
Pitchfork	5.9/10
PopMatters	8/10
Rolling Stone	3/5 stars
The Skinny	4/5 stars
Spin	6/10

The Devil Put Dinosaurs Here has received positive reviews from music critics. At Metacritic, which assigns a rating out of 100 to reviews from mainstream critics, the album has average score of 70 indicating "generally favorable reviews".

Chad Childers of Loudwire wrote: "With their new album, The Devil Put Dinosaurs Here, the veteran rockers prove they can sustain their excellence. While all the things you would expect from Alice in Chains — sludgy guitars, haunting melodies, dark lyrics — are on the disc, the band shows they can still put a fresh spin on their sound." He went on to say that "while Alice in Chains definitely does "dark" well, songs like 'Low Ceiling' and 'Breath on a Window' offer a catchier, faster-paced alternative and deliver the perfect change of pace needed mid-album" and gave the album four and a half out of five stars. Johan Wippsson of Melodic magazine felt that "The Devil Put Dinosaurs Here is overall a good and stable record, but will not count it as one of the band's best."

Dave Kerr of The Skinny awarded the album four out of five stars and wrote: "Featuring an even split of melodic slowburners and lead-heavy bangers with blindsiding tempo-shifts that arrive like eleventh hour twists to the plot, songs such as Phantom Limb and Breath On A Window carry the familiar hallmarks of AiC's heyday without entirely surrendering to the predictability they might imply. Brooding, doomy riffs usher in soaring two-part harmonies which reiterate that, against some odds, Cantrell has found a worthy foil in co-vocalist William DuVall. A significant addition to their intimidating catalogue."

Stephen Erlewine of AllMusic gave the album a more mixed review saying: "This has a digital sheen that was missing even from Black Gives Way to Blue, and it gives the album an expansive feel, so the patented churn doesn't seem quite so claustrophobic as before. Then again, perhaps that expansiveness is just a sign of age: Alice in Chains are now firmly entrenched in their middle age and settling into what they do best: retaining their signature without pandering and, tellingly, without succumbing to the darkness that otherwise defines them." He went on to give the album three out of five stars.

Jon Dolan of Rolling Stone gave a similar impression, writing: "It's the band's second LP since the 2002 death of singer Layne Staley, and though new vocalist William DuVall doesn't have his predecessor's talent for shaping Seattle sludge into molten-dread anthems, founder Jerry Cantrell's expressively torpid guitar steps up to become its own kind of lead voice, chugging mordantly on 'Hollow' and wailing like My Bloody Valentine on 'Pretty Done.'" He also went on to give the album three out of five stars.

Stephen M. Deusner of Pitchfork Media also gave a mixed review, writing: "[The title] song is six-and-a-half minutes long. It doesn't need to be. Chop it in half and you could double its impact. But the same could be said of just about any track on Dinosaurs, which typically lumber past the five-minute mark. The result is an album that feels much longer than its bloated 70 minutes, that often buries its best moments, that exhausts its most intriguing ideas either by stretching them out or simply repeating them." He then adds "On the other hand, Dinosaurs actually does have some intriguing ideas to exhaust, mostly about how you play mainstream rock in 2013."

== Commercial performance ==
The Devil Put Dinosaurs Here debuted at No. 2 on the Billboard 200 (the band's highest chart position since 1995's Alice in Chains, which debuted at No. 1), selling 61,000 copies in its first week of release. By July 31, 2013, the album had sold 120,000 copies in the US.

The album also debuted at #2 on the Canadian Albums Chart, selling 7,300 copies in its first week.

== Track listing ==
All songs written by Jerry Cantrell, except where noted

No.	Title	Writer(s)	Length
1.	"Hollow"		5:43
2.	"Pretty Done"		4:35
3.	"Stone"		4:23
4.	"Voices"		5:42
5.	"The Devil Put Dinosaurs Here"	Cantrell, Mike Inez, Sean Kinney	6:38
6.	"Lab Monkey"		5:59
7.	"Low Ceiling"	Cantrell, Kinney, Inez	5:15
8.	"Breath on a Window"		5:18
9.	"Scalpel"	Cantrell, Kinney, Inez	5:21
10.	"Phantom Limb"	William DuVall, Cantrell, Kinney, Inez	7:07
11.	"Hung on a Hook"		5:34
12.	"Choke"	Cantrell, Kinney, Inez	5:44
Total length:			67:17

== Personnel ==
Alice in Chains

- Jerry Cantrell – vocals, lead guitar
- William DuVall – vocals, rhythm guitar, guitar solo on "Phantom Limb"
- Sean Kinney – drums, percussion
- Mike Inez – bass guitar

Production

- Produced by Nick Raskulinecz and Alice in Chains
- Engineered by Paul Figueroa
- Mixing by Randy Staub
- Mastering by Ted Jensen
- Artwork by Ryan Clark
- Photography by Kabacchi & Ballista

== Awards and nominations ==
Year	Award	Category	Nominee	Result
2013	Metal Storm Awards	Best Alternative Metal Album	The Devil Put Dinosaurs Here	Nominated
2014	Grammy Awards	Best Engineered Album, Non-Classical	Randy Staub	Nominated
2014	Juno Awards	Juno Award for Recording Engineer of the Year	Randy Staub for "Hollow"	Nominated
2014	Loudwire Music Awards	Rock Album of the Year	The Devil Put Dinosaurs Here	Nominated
2014	Loudwire Music Awards	Guitarist of the Year	Jerry Cantrell	Nominated
2014	Loudwire Music Awards	Rock Song of the Year	"Hollow"	Nominated
2014	Loudwire Music Awards	Rock Video of the Year	"Hollow"	Nominated
2014	Revolver Golden Gods Awards	Song of the Year	"Hollow"	Nominated
2014	Revolver Golden Gods Awards	Dimebag Darrell Best Guitarist(s) Award	Jerry Cantrell	Nominated

== Charts ==
=== Weekly charts ===
Chart (2013)	Peak position
Spanish Albums (Promusicae)	56
Italian Albums (FIMI)	56
Dutch Albums (Album Top 100)	52
Belgian Albums (Ultratop Flanders)	52
Swedish Albums (Sverigetopplistan)	35
Belgian Albums (Ultratop Wallonia)	33
Hungarian Albums (MAHASZ)	28
German Albums (Offizielle Top 100)	23
UK Albums (Official Charts)	22
Danish Albums (Hitlisten)	14
Austrian Albums (Ö3 Austria)	13
New Zealand Albums (RMNZ)	12
Swiss Albums (Schweizer Hitparade)	11
Australian Albums (ARIA)	10
Norwegian Albums (VG-lista)	6
Finnish Albums (Suomen virallinen lista)	6
Canadian Albums Chart	2
UK Rock & Metal Albums (Official Charts)	1
US Top Vinyl Albums	13
US Top Tastemakers Albums	2
US Top Hard Rock Albums	1
US Top Alternative Albums	1
US Top Rock Albums	1
US Billboard 200	2

=== Year-end charts ===
Year	Chart	Position
2013	US Billboard 200	188
