= Alice in Chains =

American rock band

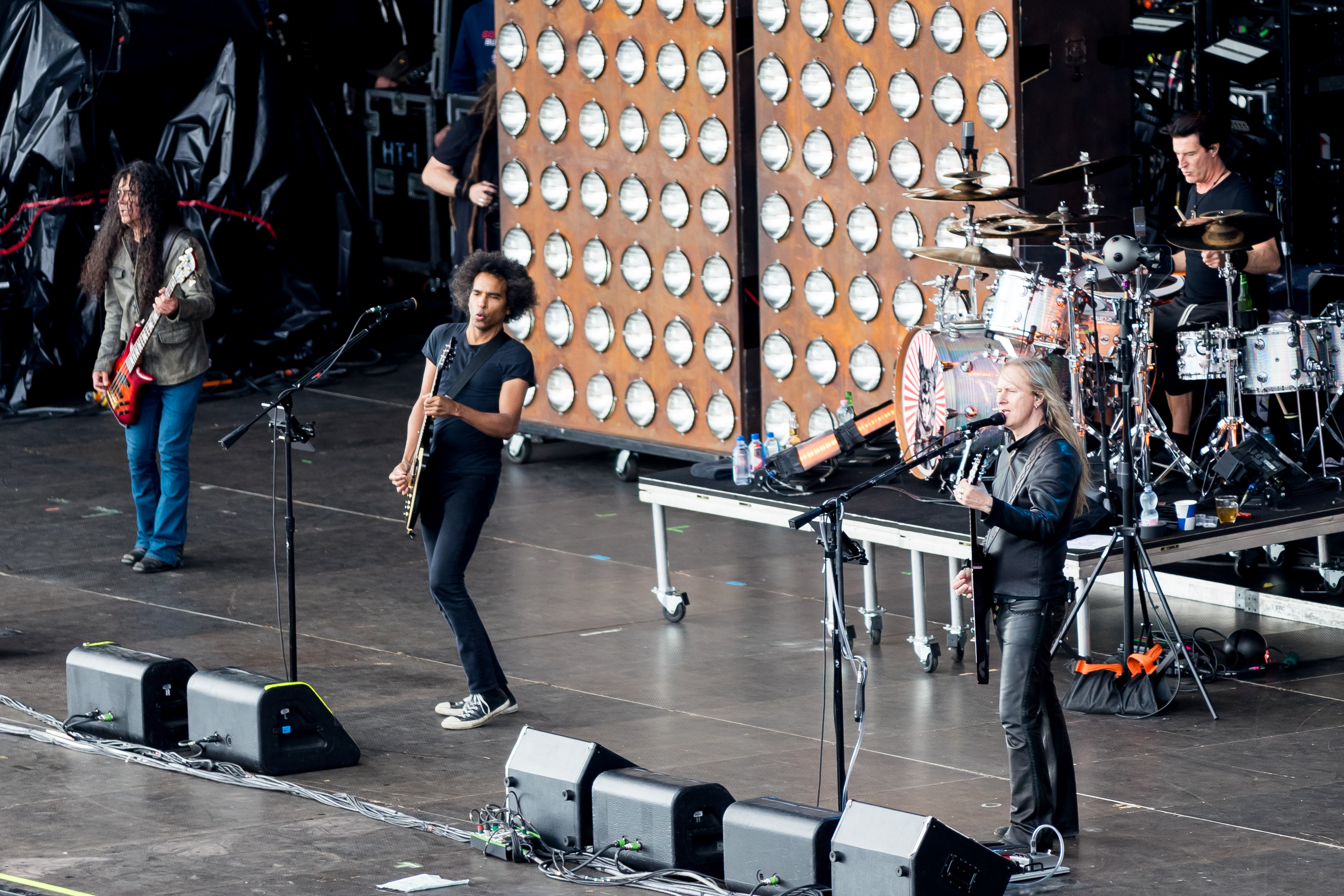
- Alice in Chains performing at Rock am Ring in 2019. From left to right: Mike Inez, William DuVall, Jerry Cantrell and Sean Kinney.

Background information
- Origin: Seattle, Washington, United States
- Genres: Grunge; alternative metal; heavy metal; alternative rock; sludge metal
- Works: Discography
- Years active: 1987–2002 (hiatus: 1999–2002); 2005–present
- Labels: Columbia; Virgin; EMI; Capitol; BMG
- Spinoffs: Mad Season; Spys4Darwin
- Spinoff of: Diamond Lie; Alice N Chains
- Members: Jerry Cantrell; Sean Kinney; Mike Inez; William DuVall
- Past members: Layne Staley; Mike Starr
- Website: aliceinchains.com

Alice in Chains (often abbreviated as AIC) is an American rock band formed in Seattle in 1987. Since 2006, the band's lineup has consisted of vocalist/guitarists Jerry Cantrell and William DuVall, bassist Mike Inez, and drummer Sean Kinney. Original vocalist Layne Staley died in 2002, and former bassist Mike Starr left in 1993. Often associated with grunge music, Alice in Chains' sound and style is rooted in heavy metal. The band is known for its distinctive vocal style, which often included the harmonized vocals between Staley and Cantrell (and later Cantrell and DuVall).

Alice in Chains' original lineup consisted of Cantrell, Kinney, Staley, and Starr. They took the name from Staley's previous band, Alice N' Chains. The band rose to international fame as part of the grunge movement of the early 1990s, along with other Seattle bands such as Nirvana, Pearl Jam, and Soundgarden. They broke through on MTV and mainstream rock radio with the single "Man in the Box" (from their 1990 debut album Facelift). After releasing the EP Sap in early 1992, the band achieved major mainstream and commercial success with their follow-up album Dirt later that same year. Dirt contained the popular singles "Rooster" and "Would?", among others. Starr was replaced on bass by Inez in early 1993. The following two records, 1994's Jar of Flies (which included the popular single "No Excuses") and 1995's Alice in Chains (also contained radio hits such as "Heaven Beside You" and "Grind"), both topped the US Billboard 200 chart and earned the band several Grammy Award nominations.

Alice in Chains was plagued by extended inactivity from 1996 onward, largely due to Staley's substance abuse, which resulted in his death in 2002 and caused the band to go on hiatus. Alice in Chains reunited in 2005, with DuVall joining in 2006 as rhythm guitarist and sharing lead vocal duties; the band has since released three more albums: Black Gives Way to Blue (2009), The Devil Put Dinosaurs Here (2013), and Rainier Fog (2018).

In the US, Alice in Chains has sold over 30 million RIAA-certified records. They have had 18 Top 10 songs on Billboard's Mainstream Rock Tracks chart and five No. 1 hits, and have received 11 Grammy Award nominations. The band has been included in numerous greatest of all time lists, including a position of No. 34 on VH1's "100 Greatest Artists of Hard Rock" special and No. 15 in Hit Parader's "Greatest Live Bands" list.

== History ==
=== 1984–1989: Formation and early years ===
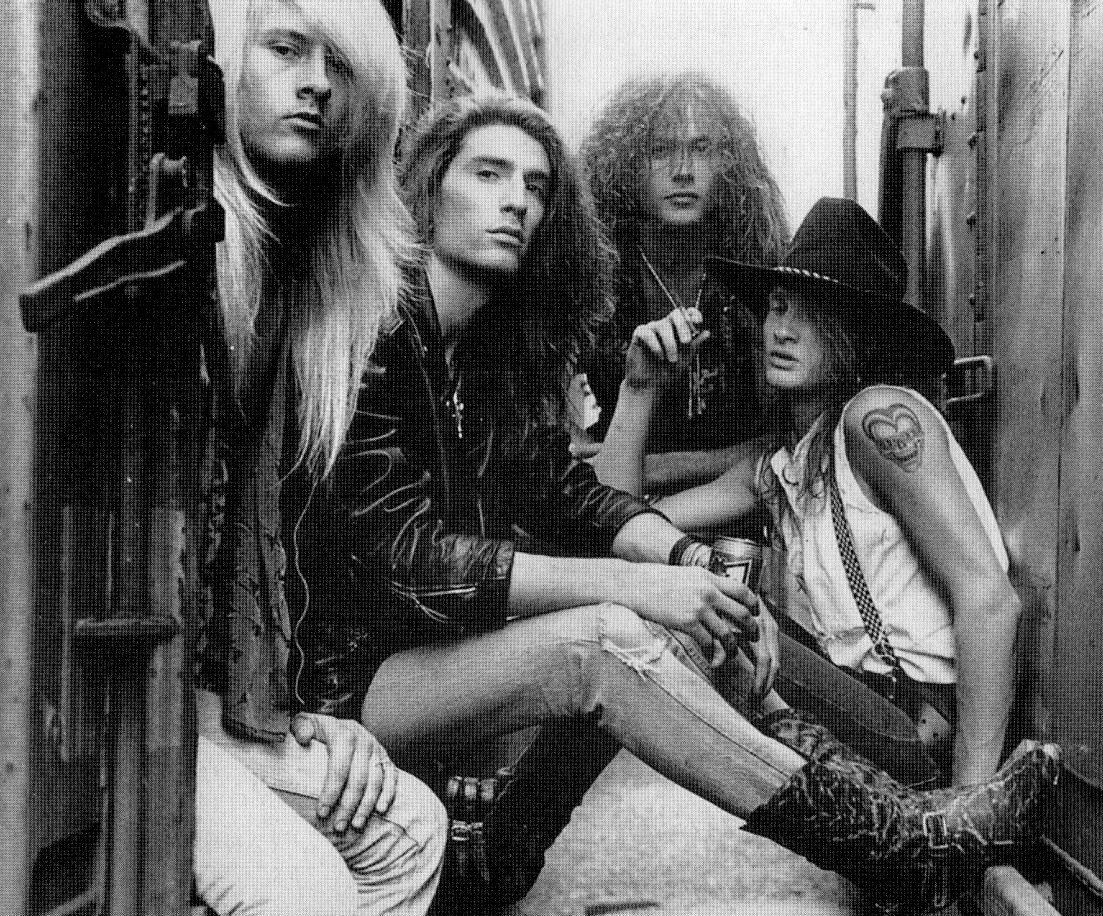
The original lineup in a 1988 promo. From left: Jerry Cantrell, Sean Kinney, Mike Starr, Layne Staley.

Before the formation of Alice in Chains, Layne Staley, a drummer at the time, landed his first gig as a vocalist when he auditioned to sing for a local glam metal band known as Sleze after receiving some encouragement from his stepbrother Ken Elmer. Other members of this group at that time were guitarists Johnny Bacolas and Zoli Semanate, drummer James Bergstrom, and bassist Byron Hansen.

This band went through several lineup changes culminating with Nick Pollock as their sole guitarist and Bacolas switching to bass before discussions arose about changing their name to Alice in Chains. This was prompted by a conversation that Bacolas had with Russ Klatt, the lead singer of Slaughter Haus 5, about backstage passes. One of the passes said "Welcome to Wonderland", and they started talking about that being a reference to Alice in Wonderland, until Klatt said, "What about Alice in Chains? Put her in bondage and stuff like that."

Bacolas liked the name "Alice in Chains" and brought it up to his bandmates; they agreed and decided to change the band's name. Due to concerns over the reference to female bondage, the group ultimately chose to spell it differently as Alice N' Chains to allay any parental concerns, though Staley's mother Nancy McCallum has said she was still not happy with this name at first. According to Bacolas, the decision to use the apostrophe-N combination in their name had nothing to do with the band Guns N' Roses. The name change happened a year before Guns N' Roses became a household name with their first album, Appetite for Destruction, released in July 1987.

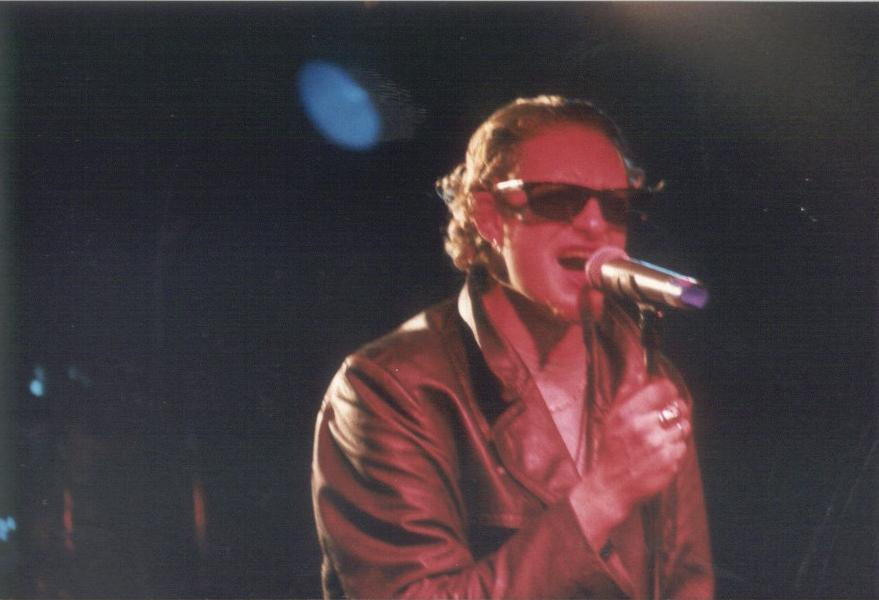
Layne Staley performing with Alice in Chains at The Channel in Boston in 1992

Staley met guitarist Jerry Cantrell at a party in Seattle around August 1987. A few months prior, Cantrell had watched a concert of Alice N' Chains in his hometown at the Tacoma Little Theatre, and was impressed by Staley's voice. Cantrell was homeless after being kicked out of his family's house, so Staley invited Cantrell to live with him at the rehearsal studio Music Bank.

Alice N' Chains soon disbanded, and Staley joined a funk band. Cantrell's band, Diamond Lie, broke up and he wanted to form a new band, so Staley gave him the phone number of Melinda Starr, the girlfriend of drummer Sean Kinney, so that Cantrell could set up a meeting with Kinney. Kinney and his girlfriend went to the Music Bank and listened to Cantrell's demos, who mentioned that they needed a bass player to jam with them, and he had someone in mind: Mike Starr, Melinda's brother, with whom Cantrell had played in a band in Burien called Gypsy Rose. Kinney mentioned that his girlfriend was actually Mike Starr's sister, and that he had been playing in bands together with Starr since they were kids. Kinney called Starr and a few days later he started jamming with him and Cantrell at the Music Bank.

Staley's funk band also required a guitarist at the time, and Staley asked Cantrell to join as a sideman. Cantrell agreed on condition that Staley join his band. Because Cantrell, Starr and Kinney wanted Staley to be their lead singer, they started auditioning terrible lead singers in front of Staley to send a hint. When they auditioned a male stripper, Staley decided to join the band. Eventually the funk project broke up, and in 1987 Staley joined Cantrell's band on a full-time basis. Two weeks after the band's formation, they were playing a gig at Washington State University, trying to fill in a 40-minute set with a couple of original songs along with Hanoi Rocks and David Bowie covers.

The band played a couple of gigs in clubs around the Pacific Northwest, calling themselves different monikers, including Diamond Lie, the name of Cantrell's previous band, and "Fuck", before eventually adopting the name that Staley's previous band had initially flirted with, Alice in Chains. Staley contacted his former bandmates and asked for permission to use the name. Nick Pollock was not particularly thrilled about it at the time, and thought he should come up with a different name; both he and James Bergstrom ultimately gave Staley their blessing to use the name.

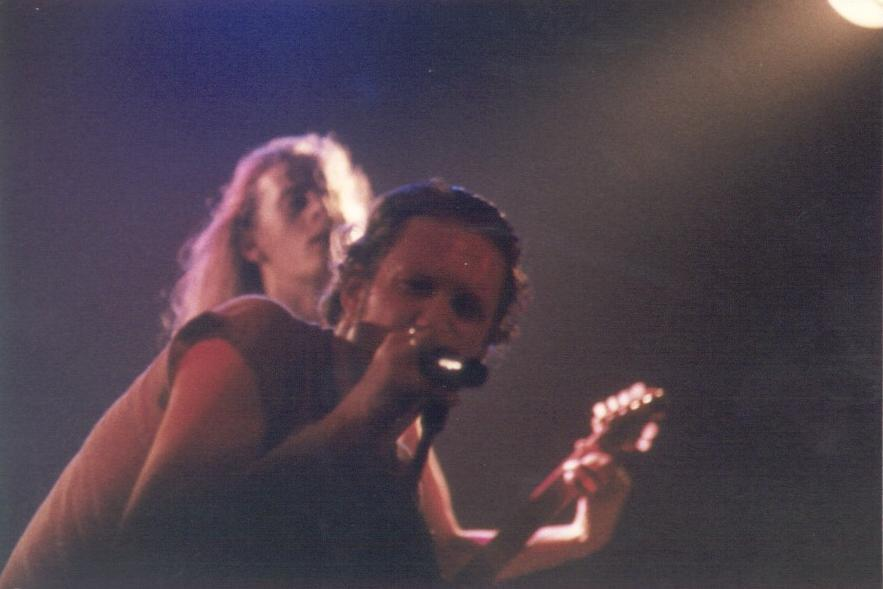
Layne Staley and Jerry Cantrell at The Channel, 1992

Local promoter Randy Hauser became aware of the band at a concert and offered to pay for demo recordings. However, one day before the band was due to record at the Music Bank studio in Washington, police shut down the studio during the biggest cannabis raid in the history of the state. The final demo, completed in 1988, was named The Treehouse Tapes and found its way to music managers Kelly Curtis and Susan Silver, who also managed the Seattle-based band Soundgarden. Curtis and Silver passed the demo on to Columbia Records' A&R representative Nick Terzo, who set up an appointment with label president Don Ienner. Based on The Treehouse Tapes, Terzo signed Alice in Chains to Columbia in 1989.

=== 1990–1992: Facelift and Sap ===
Alice in Chains soon became a top priority of the label, which released the band's first official recording in July 1990, a promotional EP called We Die Young. The EP's lead single, "We Die Young", became a hit on metal radio. After its success, the label rushed Alice in Chains' debut album into production with producer Dave Jerden. Cantrell stated the album was intended to have a "moody aura" that was a "direct result of the brooding atmosphere and feel of Seattle."

The resulting album, Facelift, was released on August 21, 1990, peaking at number 42 in mid-1991 on the Billboard 200 chart. Facelift was not an instant success, selling under 40,000 copies in the first six months of release, until MTV added "Man in the Box" to regular daytime rotation. The single hit number 18 on the Mainstream rock charts, with the album's follow up single, "Sea of Sorrow", reaching number 27, and in six weeks Facelift sold 400,000 copies in the US. The album was a critical success, with Steve Huey of AllMusic citing Facelift as "one of the most important records in establishing an audience for grunge and alternative rock among hard rock and heavy metal listeners." Sammy Hagar claimed he invited the band to tour with Van Halen after he saw the music video for "Man In The Box" on MTV.

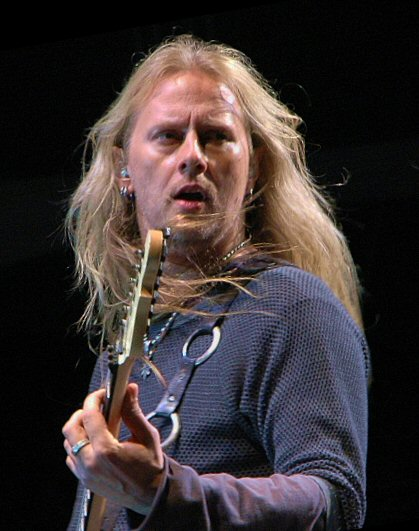
Guitarist and founder Jerry Cantrell, along with Staley, is credited with creating the band's sound.

Facelift was certified gold by the Recording Industry Association of America (RIAA) for selling 500,000 copies on September 11, 1991, becoming the first album from Seattle's grunge movement to be certified gold. The band continued to hone its audience, opening for such artists as Iggy Pop, Van Halen, Poison, and Extreme. Facelift has since been certified triple-platinum by the RIAA, for shipments of 3,000,000 copies in the US.

The concert at the Moore Theatre in Seattle on December 22, 1990, was recorded and released on VHS in mid-1991, as Live Facelift. It features five live songs and three music videos. The home video has been certified gold by the RIAA for sales exceeding 50,000 copies.

In early 1991, Alice in Chains landed the opening slot for the Clash of the Titans tour with Anthrax, Megadeth, and Slayer, exposing the band to a wide metal audience but receiving mainly poor reception. Alice in Chains was nominated for a Best Hard Rock Performance Grammy Award in 1992 for "Man in the Box".

Following the tour, Alice in Chains entered the studio to record demos for its next album, but ended up recording five acoustic songs instead. While in the studio, drummer Sean Kinney had a dream about "making an EP called Sap". The band decided "not to mess with fate", and on February 4, 1992, Alice in Chains released their second EP, Sap. The EP was released while Nirvana's Nevermind was at the top of the Billboard 200 charts, resulting in a rising popularity of Seattle-based bands, and of the term "grunge music". Sap was certified gold within two weeks. The EP features Cantrell on lead vocals on the opening track, "Brother", and guest vocals by Ann Wilson from the band Heart, who joined Staley and Cantrell for the choruses of "Brother" and "Am I Inside". The EP also features Mark Arm of Mudhoney and Chris Cornell of Soundgarden, who shared vocals with Staley and Cantrell on the song "Right Turn", credited to "Alice Mudgarden" in the liner notes.

In 1992, Alice in Chains appeared in the Cameron Crowe film Singles, performing their song "It Ain't Like That" while portraying an unnamed bar band. The band also contributed the song "Would?" to the film's soundtrack, whose video received an award for Best Video from a Film at the 1993 MTV Video Music Awards.

=== 1992–1993: Dirt ===
In March 1992, the band returned to the studio. With new songs written primarily on the road, the material has an overall darker feel than Facelift, with six of the album's thirteen songs dealing with the subject of addiction. "We did a lot of soul searching on this album. There's a lot of intense feelings." Cantrell said, "We deal with our daily demons through music. All of the poison that builds up during the day we cleanse when we play." On September 29, 1992, Alice in Chains released its second album, Dirt. The album peaked at number six on the Billboard 200 and since its release has been certified 5× platinum by the RIAA, making Dirt the band's highest selling album to date. The album was a critical success, with Huey praising the album as a "major artistic statement, and the closest they ever came to recording a flat-out masterpiece." Chris Gill of Guitar World called Dirt "huge and foreboding, yet eerie and intimate", and "sublimely dark and brutally honest."

That darkness was always part of the band, but it wasn't all about that. There was always an optimism, even in the darkest shit we wrote. With Dirt, it's not like we were saying 'Oh yeah, this is a good thing.' It was more of a warning than anything else, rather than 'Hey, come and check this out, it's great!' We were talking about what was going on at the time, but within that there was always a survivor element – a kind of triumph over the darker elements of being a human being. I still think we have all of that intact, but maybe the percentage has shifted.

— Jerry Cantrell in 2013

Dirt spawned five singles that reached the top 30 on the Billboard Mainstream Rock chart: "Would?", "Rooster", "Them Bones", "Angry Chair", and "Down in a Hole", and remained on the charts for nearly two years. Alice in Chains was added as openers to Ozzy Osbourne's No More Tours tour. Days before the tour began, Layne Staley broke his foot in an ATV accident, forcing him to use crutches on stage.

Starr left the band after the release of Dirt. Staley told Rolling Stone in 1994 about Starr leaving the band, "It was just a difference in priorities. We wanted to continue intense touring and press. Mike was ready to go home." Years later, Starr claimed that he was fired due to his drug addiction.

Starr was replaced by former Ozzy Osbourne bassist Mike Inez. Inez had met Alice in Chains during Ozzy Osbourne's No More Tours tour and became friends with them. When the band was in Brazil, they called Inez to join them and he accepted. Inez wanted to do the shows in Brazil and even got his immunization shots, but the band called him back saying that Starr wanted to do the last two shows in Brazil, so they would meet Inez in London instead. Inez ended up getting sick with his vaccination shots for a couple of days. Inez played his first concert with Alice in Chains on January 27, 1993, at the Camden Underworld in London.

In April 1993, the band recorded two songs with Inez, "What the Hell Have I" and "A Little Bitter", for the Last Action Hero soundtrack. During the summer of 1993, Alice in Chains toured with the alternative music festival Lollapalooza, their last major tour with Staley.

=== 1993–1994: Jar of Flies ===
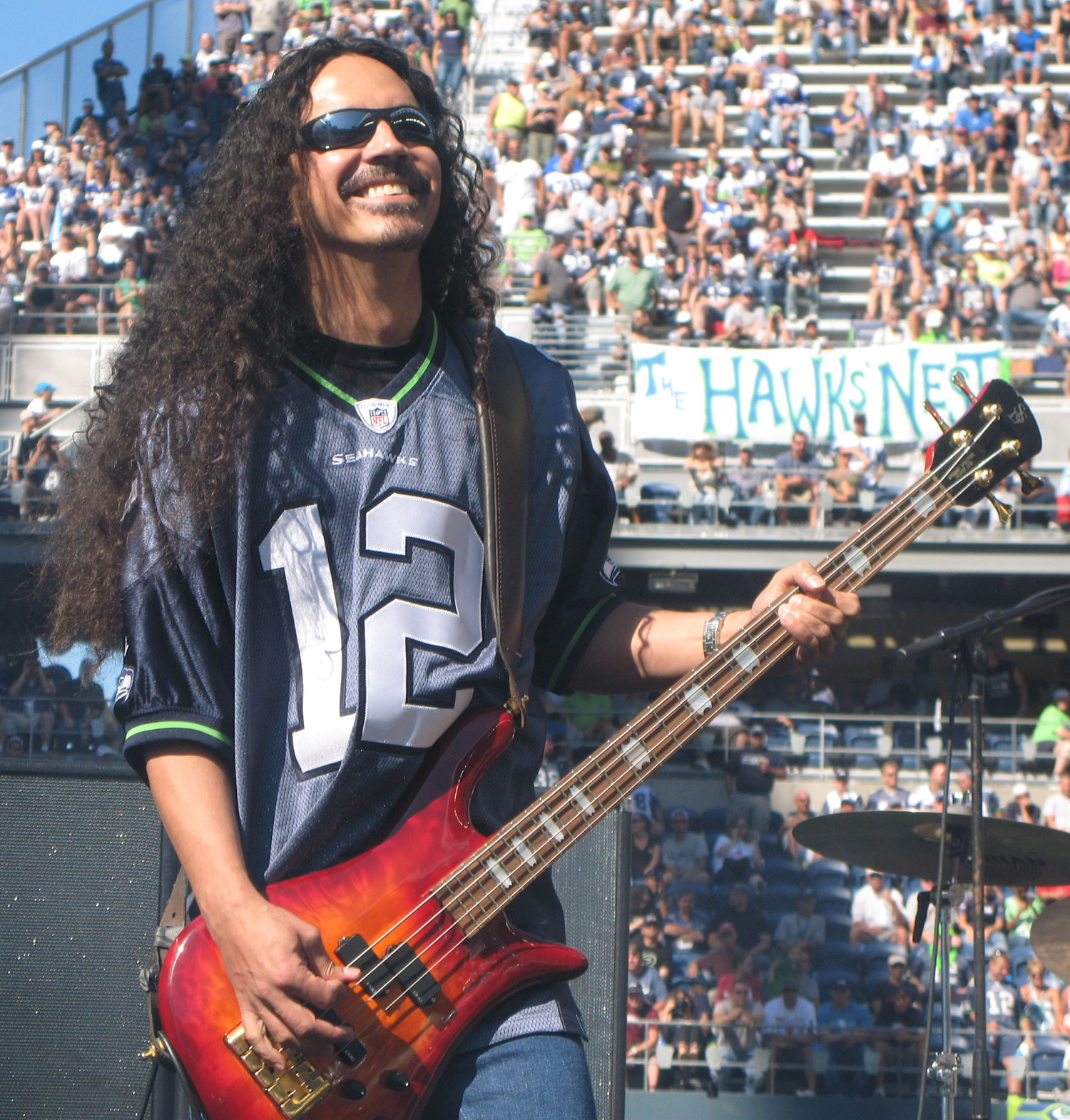
Bassist Mike Inez joined Alice in Chains in 1993.

Following Alice in Chains' extensive 1993 world tour, Staley said the band "just wanted to go into the studio for a few days with our acoustic guitars and see what happened." "We never really planned on the music we made at that time to be released. But the record label heard it and they really liked it. For us, it was just the experience of four guys getting together in the studio and making some music."

Columbia Records released Alice in Chains' second acoustic-based EP, Jar of Flies, on January 25, 1994. Written and recorded in one week, Jar of Flies debuted at number one on the Billboard 200, becoming the first EP—and first Alice in Chains release—to top the charts.

Paul Evans of Rolling Stone called the EP "darkly gorgeous", and Steve Huey said, "'Jar of Flies' is a low-key stunner, achingly gorgeous and harrowingly sorrowful all at once." Jar of Flies features Alice in Chains' first number-one single on the Mainstream Rock charts, "No Excuses". The second single, "I Stay Away", reached number ten on the Mainstream rock charts, while the final single "Don't Follow", reached number 25. Jar of Flies has been certified triple platinum by the RIAA, with over 2 million copies sold in the United States during its first year. Jar of Flies received two Grammy nominations, Best Hard Rock Performance for "I Stay Away", and Best Recording Package.

After the release of Jar of Flies, Staley entered rehab for heroin addiction. The band was scheduled to tour during the summer of 1994 with Metallica, Suicidal Tendencies, Danzig, and Fight, as well as a slot during Woodstock '94, but while in rehearsal for the tour, Staley began using heroin again. Staley's condition prompted the other band members to cancel all scheduled dates one day before the start of the tour, putting the band on hiatus. Alice in Chains was replaced by Candlebox on the tour. Susan Silver's management office sent out a statement saying that the decision to withdraw from the Metallica tour and Woodstock was "due to health problems within the band." Shortly after withdrawing, the band broke up for six months, with Kinney telling Rolling Stone in 1996, "Nobody was being honest with each other back then. If we had kept going, there was a good chance we would have self-destructed on the road, and we definitely didn't want that to happen in public."

=== 1995–1996: Alice in Chains ===
While Alice in Chains was inactive during 1995, Staley joined the "grunge supergroup" Mad Season, which also featured Pearl Jam guitarist Mike McCready, bassist John Baker Saunders from The Walkabouts, and Screaming Trees drummer Barrett Martin. Mad Season released one album, Above, for which Staley provided lead vocals and the album artwork. The album spawned a number two Mainstream Rock chart single, "River of Deceit", and a home video release of Live at the Moore.

In April 1995, Alice in Chains entered Bad Animals Studio in Seattle with producer Toby Wright, who had previously worked with Corrosion of Conformity and Slayer. While in the studio, an inferior version of the song "Grind" was leaked to radio, and received major airplay. On October 6, the band released the studio version of the song to radio via satellite uplink to stem the excessive spread of taped copies of the song. On November 7, 1995, Columbia Records released their self-titled album, Alice in Chains, which debuted at number one on the Billboard 200 and has since been certified triple platinum. Of the album's four singles, "Grind", "Again", "Over Now", and "Heaven Beside You", three feature Cantrell on lead vocals. Jon Wiederhorn of Rolling Stone called the album "liberating and enlightening, the songs achieve a startling, staggering and palpable impact." The band released the home video The Nona Tapes On December 12, a mockumentary featuring interviews with the band members conducted by journalist Nona Weisbaum (played by Jerry Cantrell), and the music video for "Grind". The band opted not to tour in support of Alice in Chains, adding to the rumors of drug abuse.

The song "Got Me Wrong" unexpectedly charted three years after its release on the Sap EP. The song was re-released as a single on the soundtrack for the film Clerks in 1994, reaching number seven on the Mainstream Rock Tracks chart.

Alice in Chains resurfaced on April 10, 1996, to perform for MTV Unplugged, a program featuring all-acoustic set lists. The performance featured some of the band's highest-charting singles, including "Rooster", "Down in a Hole", "Heaven Beside You", "No Excuses" and "Would?", and introduced a new song, "Killer Is Me", with Cantrell on lead vocals. The show marked Alice in Chains' only appearance as a five-piece band, adding second guitarist Scott Olson. A live album of the performance was released in July 1996, which debuted at number three on the Billboard 200, and was accompanied by a home video release, both of which received platinum certification by the RIAA. The band also appeared on The Late Show with David Letterman on May 10, 1996, performing the songs "Again" and "We Die Young". Alice in Chains performed four shows supporting the reunited original Kiss lineup on their 1996–97 Alive/Worldwide Tour, including the final live appearance of Layne Staley on July 3, 1996, in Kansas City, Missouri. Shortly after the show, Staley was found unresponsive after he overdosed on heroin and was taken to the hospital. Although he recovered, the band was forced to go on hiatus.

=== 1996–2004: Hiatus, side projects and death of Layne Staley ===
Although Alice in Chains never officially disbanded, Staley became a recluse, rarely leaving his Seattle condominium following the death of his ex-fiancée Demri Parrott on October 29, 1996. "Drugs worked for me for years," Staley told Rolling Stone in February 1996, "and now they're turning against me ... now I'm walking through hell and this sucks. I didn't want my fans to think that heroin was cool. But then I've had fans come up to me and give me the thumbs up, telling me they're high. That's exactly what I didn't want to happen."

Unable to continue with new Alice in Chains material, Cantrell released his first solo album, Boggy Depot, in 1998, also featuring Sean Kinney and Mike Inez. Cantrell and Kinney were also featured on Metallica's 1998 album Garage Inc., both were guest musicians in the track "Tuesday's Gone", a Lynyrd Skynyrd cover. In October 1998, Staley reunited with Alice in Chains to record two new songs, "Get Born Again" and "Died". Originally intended for Cantrell's second solo album, the songs were reworked by Alice in Chains and were released in the fall of 1999 on a box set, Music Bank. The set contains 48 songs, including rarities, demos, and previously released album tracks and singles. The band also released a 15-track compilation titled Nothing Safe: Best of the Box, serving as a sampler for Music Bank, as well as the band's first compilation album; a live album, simply titled Live, released on December 5, 2000; and a second compilation, titled Greatest Hits in 2001.

In November 1998, Layne Staley recorded a cover of Pink Floyd's "Another Brick in the Wall" with the supergroup Class of '99. The song was featured on the soundtrack to the 1998 horror/sci-fi film, The Faculty.

After they toured as part of Cantrell's solo band in 1998, Sean Kinney and Queensrÿche guitarist Chris DeGarmo formed a new band called Spys4Darwin. Mike Inez and Sponge lead vocalist Vin Dombroski joined the supergroup soon after. The band released their first and only album in 2001, a 6-track EP entitled Microfish. In June 2001, Mike Inez joined Zakk Wylde's Black Label Society for the remaining dates of Ozzfest, following the departure of bassist Steve Gibb for medical reasons. Inez joined the band again for their West Coast and Japanese tour in 2003.

By 2002, Cantrell had finished work on his second solo album, Degradation Trip. Written in 1998, the album's lyrical content focused heavily on what Cantrell regarded as the demise of Alice in Chains, which still remained evident as the album approached its June 2002 release. However, in March that year, Cantrell commented, "We're all still around, so it's possible [Alice in Chains] could all do something someday, and I fully hope someday we will."

Reflecting on the band's hiatus in a 2011 interview, Kinney said that Staley wasn't the only one battling addiction.

He was the focal point, like singers are. So they'd single him out. But the truth was, it was pretty much everybody. I definitely had my hand firmly on the wheel going off the cliff. And the reason we pulled back – you know when you stop when you have two No. 1 records, it's not really the greatest career move – but we did that because we love each other and we didn't want to die in public. And I know for a fact in my heart that if we were to continue that I wouldn't be on the phone right now talking to you. I wouldn't have made it. I just wouldn't have.

After a decade of battling drug addiction, Layne Staley was found dead in his condominium on April 19, 2002. The autopsy and toxicology report revealed that he died from a mixture of heroin and cocaine, known as "speedball". The autopsy concluded that Staley died on April 5, two weeks before his body was found. Cantrell dedicated his 2002 solo album, Degradation Trip, released two months after Staley's death, to his memory. Mike Starr later claimed on Celebrity Rehab that he was the last person to see Staley alive, and admitted to feeling guilty about not calling 911 after Staley had warned him against it. "I wish I hadn't been high on benzodiazepine [that night], I wouldn't have just walked out the door," Starr said.

Following Staley's death, Mike Inez joined Heart and toured and recorded with the band from 2002 through 2006. Jerry Cantrell collaborated with several artists such as Heart, Ozzy Osbourne, and Damageplan. In 2004, Cantrell formed the band Cardboard Vampyres along with The Cult guitarist Billy Duffy, Mötley Crüe vocalist and Ratt guitarist John Corabi, The Cult bassist Chris Wyse and drummer Josh Howser. On October 22, 2004, Sony BMG terminated their contract with Alice in Chains, 15 years after the band signed with the label, in 1989.

=== 2005–2008: Reunion shows and reformation ===
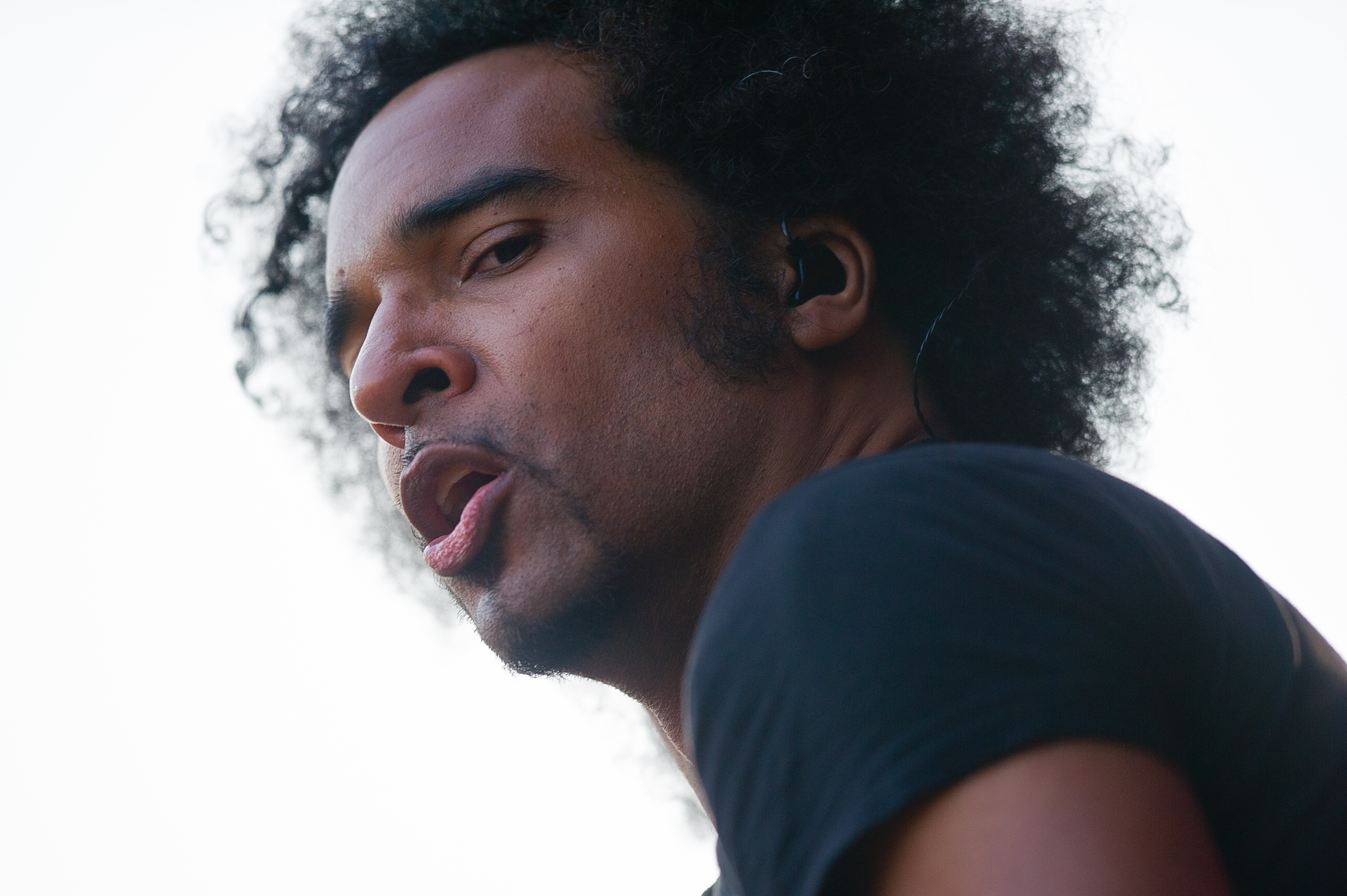
Alice in Chains' current lead vocalist, William DuVall, replaced Staley in the reformed band in 2006.

In 2005, Sean Kinney came up with the idea of doing a benefit concert for the victims of the tsunami disaster that struck South Asia in 2004. Kinney made calls to his former bandmates, as well as friends in the music community, such as former Alice in Chains manager Susan Silver. Kinney was surprised by the enthusiastic response to his idea. On February 18, 2005, Jerry Cantrell, Mike Inez, and Sean Kinney reunited to perform for the first time in nine years at K-Rock Tsunami Continued Care Relief Concert in Seattle. The band featured Damageplan vocalist Pat Lachman, as well as other special guests including Maynard James Keenan of Tool, Wes Scantlin of Puddle of Mudd and Ann Wilson of Heart. A few months after that experience, the band called Susan Silver and Cantrell's manager Bill Siddons and said they wanted to tour as Alice in Chains again. Alice in Chains was approached by the producers of the CBS reality show Rock Star about being featured on its second season, but the band turned the offer down. In the show, aspiring singers competed to become the lead vocalist of a featured group.

On March 10, 2006, the surviving members performed at VH1's Decades Rock Live! concert, honoring fellow Seattle musicians Ann and Nancy Wilson of Heart. They played "Would?" with vocalist Phil Anselmo of Pantera and Down and bass player Duff McKagan of Guns N' Roses and Velvet Revolver, and at the end of the performance Cantrell dedicated the show to Layne Staley and the late Pantera and Damageplan guitarist Dimebag Darrell. They also played "Rooster" with Comes with the Fall vocalist William DuVall and Ann Wilson. The band followed the concert with a short United States club tour named "Finish What We Started", several festival dates in Europe, and a brief tour in Japan. Duff McKagan again joined the band for the reunion tour, playing rhythm guitar on selected songs. During the tour, the band played a 5-minute video tribute to Staley during the changeover from the electric to acoustic set.

To coincide with the band's reunion, Sony Music released the long-delayed third Alice in Chains compilation, The Essential Alice in Chains, a double album that includes 28 songs.

Jerry Cantrell met William DuVall in Los Angeles in 2000 through a mutual acquaintance who introduced Cantrell to Comes with the Fall's first album. Cantrell started hanging out with the band and occasionally joined them onstage. Between 2001 and 2002, Comes with the Fall was both the opening act on Cantrell's tour for his second solo album, Degradation Trip, and also his backing band, with DuVall singing Staley's parts at the concerts. DuVall joined Alice in Chains as lead singer during the band's reunion concerts in 2006, and made his first public performance with the band at VH1's Decades Rock Live! concert. According to Cantrell, it only took one audition for DuVall to get the gig. For his first rehearsal with the band, DuVall sang "Love, Hate, Love". After they finished, Sean Kinney looked at his bandmates and said, "I think the search is pretty much over." According to Mike Inez, DuVall didn't try to emulate Staley, and that's what drew them to him.

Cantrell revealed that before he suggested DuVall for the band, Sean Kinney and Mike Inez invited Sponge and Spys4Darwin lead vocalist Vin Dombroski to jam with the band in their rehearsal space. Dombroski jammed with them to a couple of songs but they did not feel he was right for the band. According to Cantrell, Stone Temple Pilots and Velvet Revolver lead singer Scott Weiland was also interested in joining the band.

Cantrell explained the reunion saying,

We want to celebrate what we did and the memory of our friend. We have played with some [singers] who can actually bring it and add their own thing to it without being a Layne clone. We're not interested in stepping on [Staley's] rich legacy. It's a tough thing to go through. Do you take the Led Zeppelin approach and never play again, because the guy was that important? That's the approach we've taken for a lot of years. Or, do you give it a shot, try something? We're willing to take a chance on it. It's completely a reunion because the three of us who're left are back together. But it's not about separating and forgetting—it's about remembering and moving on.

Before the tour, Kinney mentioned in an interview that he would be interested in writing new material, but not as Alice in Chains.

During the VH1 Rock Honors concert honoring Heart on May 12, 2007, Alice in Chains performed Heart's "Barracuda" fronted by country singer Gretchen Wilson. Heart's guitarist Nancy Wilson also joined them onstage.

Alice in Chains joined Velvet Revolver for a run of U.S. and Canadian gigs from August through October 2007. During that tour, the band also performed four special acoustic-only shows, named as "The Acoustic Hour". The acoustic performance at The Rave/Eagles Club in Milwaukee, Wisconsin on August 31, 2007, was recorded for an upcoming live album.

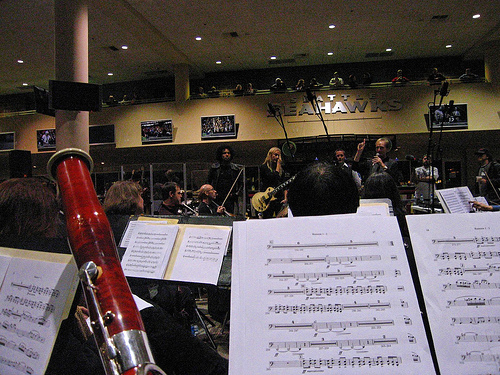
Alice in Chains rehearsing with the Northwest Symphony Orchestra in Seattle in 2007

On November 2, 2007, Alice in Chains performed a four-song set at Benaroya Hall in Seattle for Matt Messina and the Symphony Guild's 10th anniversary benefit concert for the Seattle Children's Hospital & Regional Medical Center. In addition to the band's original material, they also played a cover of Led Zeppelin's "Kashmir" while backed by over 200 musicians, including the Northwest Symphony Orchestra and the Northwest Girlchoir.

Sean Kinney said about the band's reunion:

I never called Jerry; he never called me, and said, 'Hey, let's get the band back together,' you know? We had been taking every step extremely cautious and slow, and just doing whatever feels right: If it's genuine and we're doing it for genuine reasons and we're all okay with it then we take a little step. None of us is broke. Nobody needs to be a rock dork, and you know, stroke their ego. I mean, we don't really operate like that. So as long as it felt good and from the right place and it's about making music and carrying on...

About the pressure being put on DuVall for replacing Staley as lead vocalist, Cantrell said,

To put all that weight on Will's shoulders is unfair. We're just figuring out how we work as a team. Although the band has changed, we've lost Layne, we've added Will, and there was no master plan. Playing again in 2005 felt right, so we did the next thing and toured. We did it step by step. It's more than just making music, and it always has been. We've been friends a long time. We've been more of a family than most, and it had to be okay from here [pointing to his heart].

Former The Doors manager Bill Siddons and his management company, Core Entertainment, co-managed Alice in Chains with original manager Susan Silver from 2005 to 2007.

The band started writing and demoing songs for a new album with DuVall in April 2007. But the band did not show further signs of progress until October 2008, when they announced that they had begun recording with producer Nick Raskulinecz in the studio.

=== 2008–2011: Black Gives Way to Blue and death of Mike Starr ===
Blabbermouth.net reported on September 5, 2008, that Alice in Chains would enter the studio that October to begin recording a new album for a summer 2009 release. On September 14, 2008, Alice in Chains performed at halftime during the Seattle Seahawks vs San Francisco 49ers game at the Qwest Field (now named Lumen Field ) in Seattle. The 12-minute performance for a crowd of 67,000 people featured a cover of Led Zeppelin's "Kashmir" accompanied by the Northwest Symphony Orchestra.

In October 2008, Alice in Chains began recording its fourth studio album at the Foo Fighters' Studio 606 in Los Angeles with producer Nick Raskulinecz. The band did not have a record label at the time and the album was funded by Jerry Cantrell and Sean Kinney. At the Revolver Golden God Awards, Cantrell said that the group had finished recording on March 18, 2009, and were mixing the album for a September release. The recording process was completed on Cantrell's 43rd birthday and also the same day that William DuVall's son was born. In April 2009, it was reported that the new Alice in Chains album would be released by Virgin/EMI, making it the band's first label change in its 20-plus year career.

David Benveniste and his Velvet Hammer Music & Management Group began co-managing the band with Susan Silver, marking the most recent change of management and latest development to date.

On June 11, 2009, Blabbermouth.net reported that the new album would be titled Black Gives Way to Blue and was officially set to be released on September 29, 2009. The title first appeared on Amazon.com without any prior announcement from the band. In addition, it was announced that Elton John plays piano on the title track, a tribute to Layne Staley written and sung by Cantrell. The album features new vocalist and rhythm guitarist William DuVall sharing vocal duties with lead guitarist/vocalist Jerry Cantrell, who sings lead vocals on most of the songs. DuVall sings lead vocals on the song "Last of My Kind".

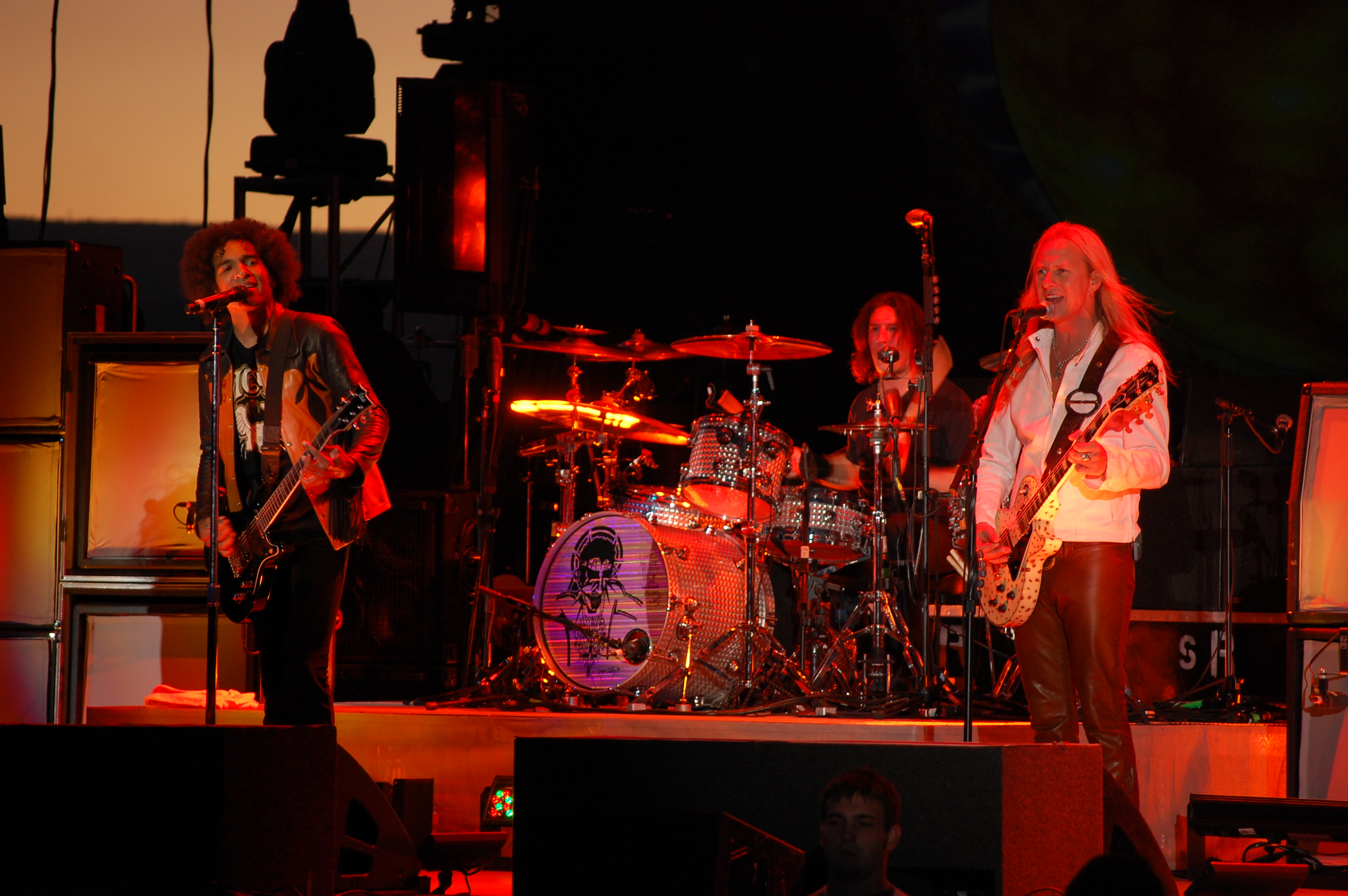
Alice in Chains performing in 2007. From left to right: William DuVall, Sean Kinney and Jerry Cantrell (Mike Inez is out of frame).

On June 30, 2009, the song "A Looking in View" was made available for purchase via iTunes and Amazon, and for a limited time it was available as a free download through the official Alice in Chains website in early July. Although it was not the album's first radio single, Rock stations across the U.S. started playing the song. The music video for "A Looking in View" debuted via the band's official website on July 7, 2009. The song was nominated for a Grammy Award for Best Hard Rock Performance.

"Check My Brain" was released to radio stations as the first official single from the album on August 14, 2009, and was made available for purchase on August 17, 2009. The music video for "Check My Brain" premiered on September 14, 2009. The song was also nominated for a Grammy Award for Best Hard Rock Performance.

To promote the album, the band released an EPK featuring all four of the members being interviewed while the Kiss makeup is being applied on them. An app for iPhone was released on October 27, 2009, featuring songs, music videos, news, photos and networking.

Sean Kinney said about the new album and the fans' mixed reactions about the band moving on after Staley's death:

Look, it's a big move to fucking stand up and move on. Some people, the music connected with them so strongly, their opinions, how they feel about it ... It's amazing that they have such a connection but they seem to act like it happened to them. This happened to us and Layne's family, not them. This is actually our lives. If we're okay with it, why can't you be? This happened to us, this didn't happen to you. But this album isn't about that, it's a bigger universal point. We're all going to fucking die, we're all going to lose somebody, and it fucking hurts. How do you move on? This record is us moving on, and hurting. That, to me, is a victory. I already feel like I've won.

Sometimes people ask us, 'Wouldn't Layne have been pissed off that we did this?' And I tell them it would have been the opposite: he would have been pissed off that it took us so long to do this. We're not doing this for money; there is no money in the music business anymore. Jerry and I funded the whole album, and we spent lots of our own money, because we believe in this. And one of the reasons I'm doing this is so more light is turned on to something where the light was turned off.

And Cantrell added: "We've toured around the world, we've lost some friends, we buried a dear friend, and somebody that you just can't fucking replace, and then we've chosen by circumstance to get together again. That turned into 'maybe we can fucking do this.' And that turned into this."

In September 2008, it was announced that Alice in Chains would headline Australia's Soundwave Festival in 2009, alongside Nine Inch Nails and Lamb of God. In February 2009, it was also announced that Alice in Chains would play at the third annual Rock on the Range festival. On August 1, 2009, Alice in Chains performed, along with Mastodon, Avenged Sevenfold, and Glyder, at Marlay Park, Dublin as direct support to Metallica. The band made an appearance on Later... with Jools Holland on November 10, 2009, performing "Lesson Learned", "Black Gives Way to Blue", and "Check My Brain" as the final performance of the episode.

To coincide with the band's European tour, Alice in Chains released its next single, "Your Decision", on November 16, 2009, in the UK and on December 1 in the US. The last single from the album was "Lesson Learned", and it was released to rock radio on June 22, 2010.

Black Gives Way to Blue debuted at No. 5 on the Billboard 200. On May 18, 2010, the album was certified gold by the RIAA for selling over 500,000 copies in the U.S. The singles "Check My Brain" and "Your Decision" reached No. 1 on Billboard's Mainstream Rock Tracks, while "Lesson Learned" reached No. 4. "Check My Brain" was also the band's first No. 1 song on the Alternative Songs chart, and on the Hot Rock Songs chart, it also reached No. 92 on Billboard's Hot 100, becoming the band's first single to appear on the chart.

Along with Mastodon and Deftones, Alice in Chains toured the United States and Canada in late 2010 on the Blackdiamondskye tour, an amalgam of the three bands' latest album titles (Black Gives Way to Blue, Diamond Eyes, and Crack the Skye).

On March 8, 2011, former Alice in Chains bassist Mike Starr was found dead at his home in Salt Lake City. Police told Reuters they were called to Starr's home at 1:42 pm and found his body; Starr was 44. Reports later surfaced that Starr's roommate had seen him mixing methadone and anxiety medication hours before he was found dead. Later reports indicated Starr's death may have been linked to two different types of antidepressants prescribed to him by his doctor. A public memorial was held for Starr at the Seattle Center's International Fountain on March 20, 2011. A private memorial was also held, which Jerry Cantrell and Sean Kinney attended according to Mike Inez.

=== 2011–2016: The Devil Put Dinosaurs Here ===
On March 21, 2011, Alice in Chains announced that they were working on a fifth studio album, and both Cantrell and Inez later made statements that they had begun the recording process. The album was expected to be finished by summer of 2012 and released by the end of 2012 or beginning of 2013. While Alice in Chains were writing for the album in 2011, Cantrell underwent surgery on his right shoulder, which delayed recording the new material. In an interview published in May 2012, Cantrell explained, "The thing that set me back is I had some bone spurs [and] cartilage issues in my shoulders. I had the same issue in the other shoulder about six years ago so I've had them both done now. It's a repetitive motion injury from playing." Cantrell could not play guitar for eight months while he was recovering from surgery. While recuperating at home in a sling, Cantrell heard a riff in his head and sang it into his phone. The riff later became the song "Stone".

Alice in Chains played their first concert in nearly 10 months and their first concert after Cantrell's shoulder surgery at the Winstar Casino in Thackerville, Oklahoma on August 13, 2011. The band's only concert in 2012 was a five-song acoustic set on May 31 at the eighth annual MusiCares MAP Fund Benefit Concert honoring Jerry Cantrell.

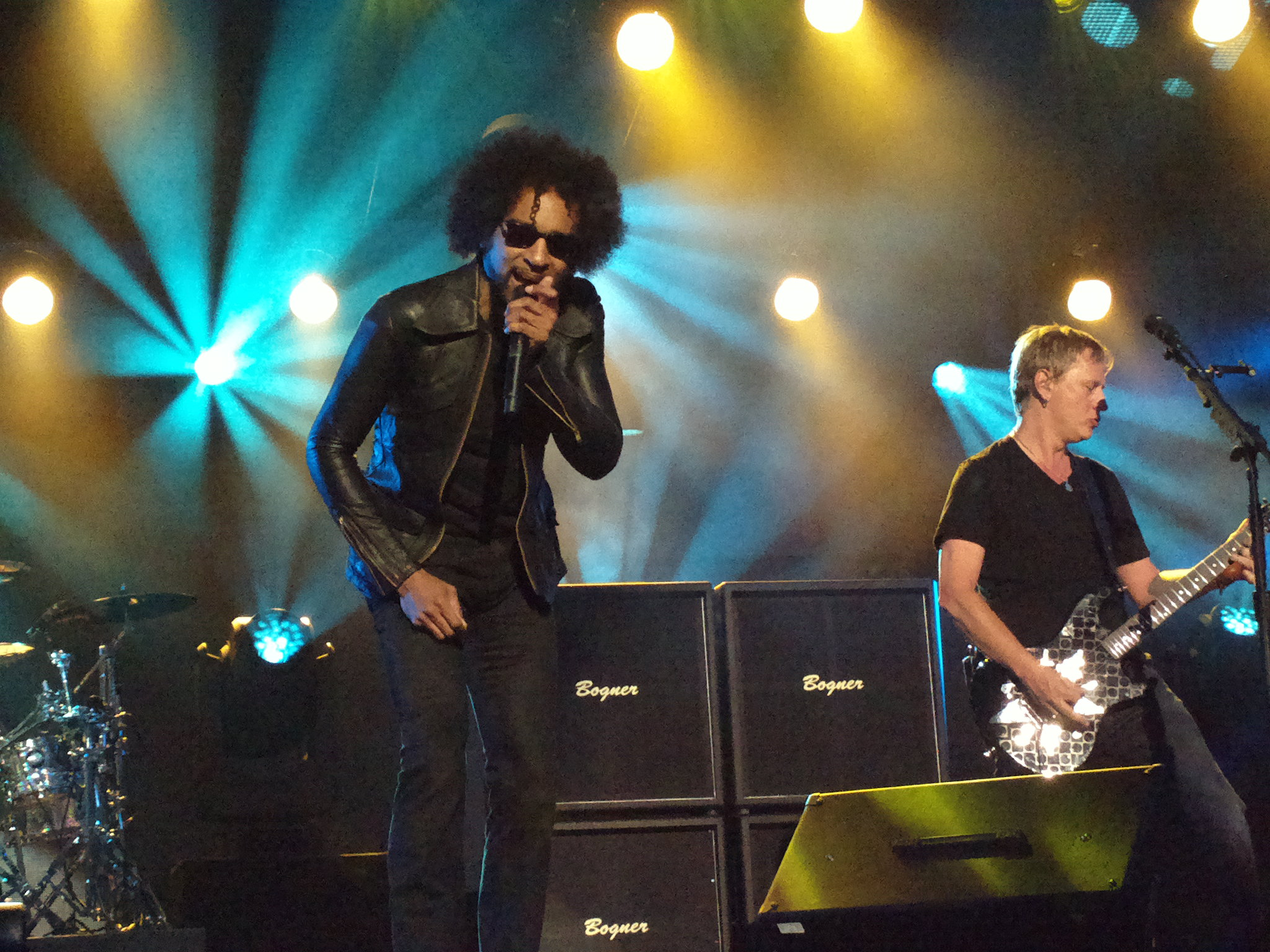
William DuVall and Jerry Cantrell performing on Jimmy Kimmel Live! in 2013

On December 4, 2012, Cantrell confirmed that the new album had been completed. The first single, "Hollow", debuted online on December 18, available for digital download in January 2013, along with an official music video. On February 13, 2013, Alice in Chains posted on Facebook that their new album title would be an anagram of the letters H V L E N T P S U S D A H I E E O E D T I U R R. The next day they announced that the album would be called The Devil Put Dinosaurs Here, which was released on May 28, 2013, and debuted at No. 2 on the Billboard 200.

To promote the album, Alice in Chains teamed up with Funny or Die for an 11-minute mockumentary titled AIC 23, in which Film Studies professor Alan Poole McLard (played by W. Earl Brown) attempts to make a documentary on Alice in Chains without any help from the actual band, interviewing other musicians instead. Among them are country singer Donnie 'Skeeter' Dollarhide Jr. (played by Jerry Cantrell), Reggae singer Nesta Cleveland (played by William DuVall), Black Metal musician Unta Gleeben Glabben Globben Globin (played by Mike Inez) and the hipster Stanley Eisen (played by Sean Kinney). The video was released on April 3, 2013, and also features cameos by Ann and Nancy Wilson from Heart, Mike McCready from Pearl Jam, Kim Thayil from Soundgarden, Duff McKagan from Guns N' Roses, Brent Hinds and Bill Kelliher from Mastodon, and Lars Ulrich and Robert Trujillo from Metallica.

In June 2013, the band released a pinball game app for iOS as part of Pinball Rocks HD compilation, featuring the single "Hollow", the band's logo and the album artwork, as well as references to the band's previous albums such as Jar of Flies and the self-titled record.

The band released videos for the songs "Hollow", "Stone", "Voices", the title track and "Phantom Limb". "Hollow" and "Stone" reached No. 1 on Billboard's Mainstream Rock Tracks, while "Voices" reached No. 3, and each one of the three songs stayed on the chart for 20 weeks. The Devil Put Dinosaurs Here was nominated for a Grammy Award for Best Engineered Album, Non-Classical in 2014.

Alice in Chains toured extensively in the U.S., Canada, and Europe in 2013 and 2014. In May 2013, the band co-headlined the annual MMRBQ festival with Soundgarden in Camden, New Jersey. Asked in September 2013 if Alice in Chains would make another album, Cantrell replied, "It'll be a while. It's [been] four years since we put the last one out, but at least it's not the gap that was between the last one, so that's about right - about three to four years."

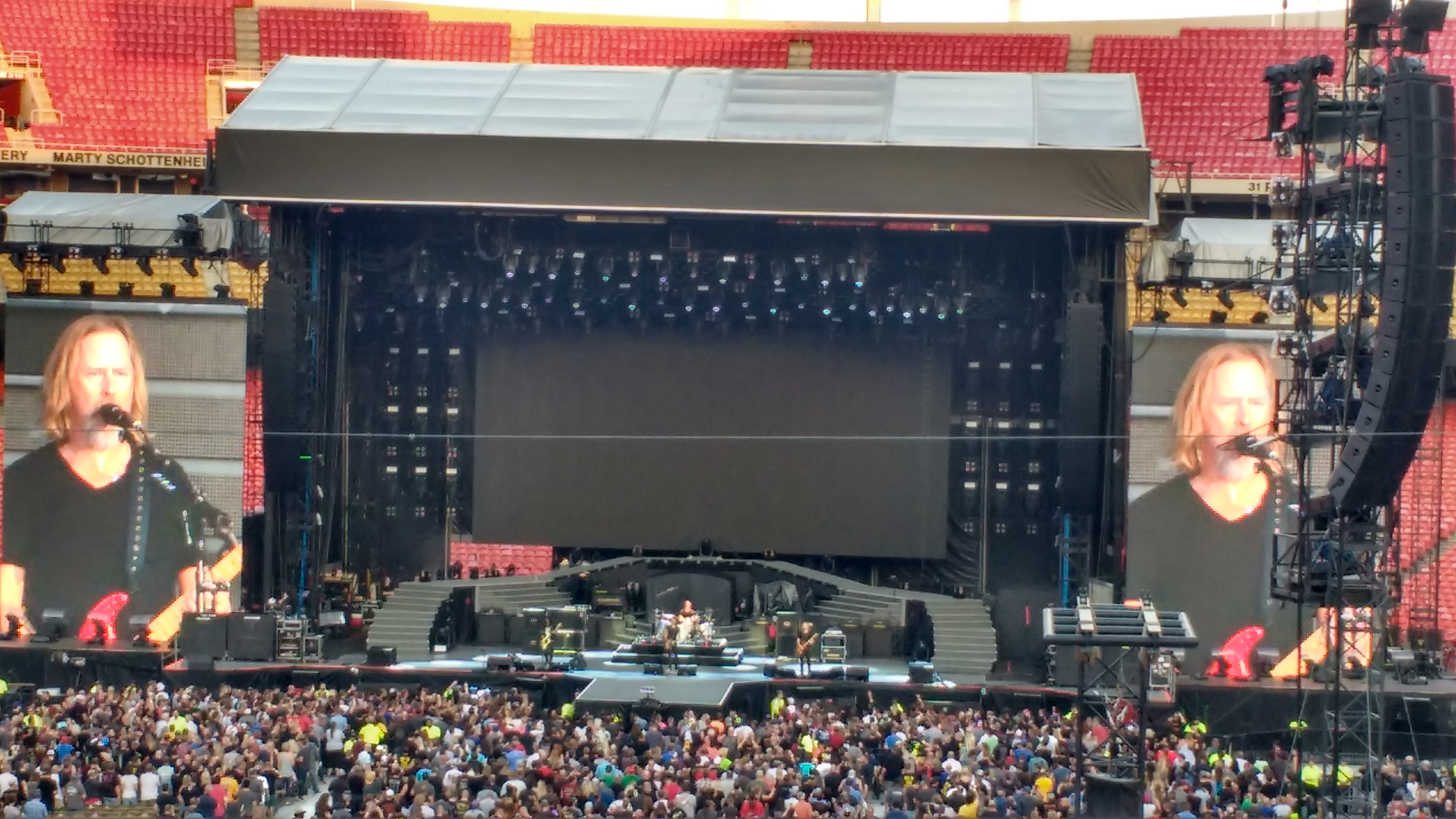
Alice in Chains opening for Guns N' Roses at Arrowhead Stadium in 2016

On January 18, 2015, Alice in Chains performed in the halftime show of the NFC Championship Game between the Seattle Seahawks and the Green Bay Packers at CenturyLink Field in Seattle. Cantrell is a lifelong Seahawks fan and often attends their games. In August 2015, Bassist Mike Inez said that the band had been "throwing around riffs for a new record" and "taking it nice and slow". The band toured in the summer of 2015 and the summer of 2016, including select shows opening for Guns N' Roses as part of the Not in This Lifetime... Tour. The band finished their 2016 tour with a concert at the Grand Sierra Resort and Casino in Reno, Nevada on October 8, 2016.

In November 2016, Alice in Chains released a cover of the Rush song "Tears", which was included in the 40th anniversary release of the album 2112. The home video Live Facelift was released on vinyl for the first time on November 25, 2016, as part of Record Store Day's Black Friday event. The album features six songs and only 5000 copies were issued.

To celebrate the tenth anniversary of Record Store Day, on April 22, 2017, Legacy Recordings released "Get Born Again"/"What the Hell Have I", a special 45 RPM double 7" single featuring four tracks remastered and available on vinyl for the first time, "What the Hell Have I", "A Little Bitter", "Get Born Again" and "Died".

=== 2017–2021: Rainier Fog ===
In January 2017, Mike Inez stated in an interview that the band had begun work on a new album. In June 2017, it was reported that the band would return to Studio X (formerly Bad Animals Studios) in Seattle to record a new album later that month, for a tentative early 2018 release. The sessions were helmed by Nick Raskulinecz, who produced the band's last two albums. Studio X was the studio where Alice in Chains recorded its 1995 self-titled album. According to Inez, the band was not signed to a label, having completed its previous two-record contract with the Universal Music Group. "This [upcoming album], we're not sure where it's gonna land ... I mean, we financed ['Black Gives Way To Blue'] on our own too, so we're not too worried about that stuff. We've just gotta get it out to ... a significant label [with worldwide distribution]."

The band started recording their sixth studio album on June 12, 2017. On January 11, 2018, producer Nick Raskulinecz announced via Instagram that the album was nearly finished and that there was only one more day left of recording. During an interview with Guitar World published on April 11, 2018, Jerry Cantrell said that the album was recorded at four studios. After recording at Studio X in Seattle, the band went to Nashville to record vocals and lead guitars at Nick Raskulinecz's home studio. But Cantrell had to take an unexpected break from work for a couple of weeks after getting sick on a trip to Cabo for Sammy Hagar's birthday. Cantrell had the band's engineer, Paul Figueroa, come in to his house and record a lot of his vocals and solos there. The band finished recording the album at the Henson Recording Studios in Los Angeles. Cantrell also said he expected the album to be released "probably sometime this summer."

At the press room of the Rock and Roll Hall of Fame Induction Ceremony on April 14, 2018, Cantrell revealed that Alice in Chains had just signed with BMG, and that they had finished mixing their new album.

Alice in Chains did not perform live in 2017. The band performed their first concert since October 2016 at the House of Blues in Boston on April 28, 2018. In May 2018, Alice in Chains headlined the festivals Carolina Rebellion, Lunatic Luau, Pointfest, Northern Invasion, the WMMR BBQ festival in Philadelphia, and the Rock on the Range festival in Columbus, Ohio on May 18, 2018, in which they paid tribute to Chris Cornell on the first anniversary of his death covering two Soundgarden songs to close their set, "Hunted Down" and "Boot Camp", respectively. At the end of the show, the lights on stage spelled out "CC" for Chris Cornell and "SG" for Soundgarden as feedback rang out. The band started their European tour in June 2018, and headlined the Tons Of Rock Festival in Norway alongside Ozzy Osbourne and Helloween. Alice in Chains are also scheduled to headline KISW's Pain in the Grass festival in August 2018.

The band released a new single, "The One You Know", via Spotify, Amazon and iTunes on May 3, 2018. A music video directed by Adam Mason was released on YouTube the same day. "The One You Know" peaked at No. 9 on Billboard's Mainstream Rock chart.

During an interview with Eddie Trunk on Trunk Nation on May 7, 2018, Jerry Cantrell said that the new album would be released at the end of August 2018. The band also revealed that they talked to director Adam Mason, who is making a dark sci-film, about doing two separate pieces of art and maybe molding them together, and that the music video for "The One You Know" is the first chapter of molding Mason's film and the band's music videos together.

The second single, "So Far Under", was released on Alice in Chains' YouTube channel and on streaming platforms on June 27, 2018. It was also announced that the album would be titled Rainier Fog, with the release date scheduled for August 24, 2018. The album's artwork and the track listing were also revealed on the same day. Jerry Cantrell told Rolling Stone that the title Rainier Fog was inspired by the Mount Rainier in Seattle, and the title track is a tribute to the Seattle music scene. "This song is a little homage to all of that: where we come from, who we are, all of the triumphs, all of the tragedies, lives lived."

The album's third single, "Never Fade", was released on August 10, 2018, through digital and streaming services. The song is a tribute dedicated to frontman William DuVall's grandmother, Chris Cornell, and Alice in Chains' original singer Layne Staley. "Never Fade" peaked at No. 10 on Billboard's Mainstream Rock chart. A music video directed by Adam Mason was released on November 1, 2018, and continued the storyline from the music video of "The One You Know".

In June 2018, William DuVall said in an interview with Swedish website Rocksverige that the music video for "The One You Know" is the first chapter of what the band is hoping will be visuals for all ten songs from the album Rainier Fog, and in addition to that, will be a companion piece to the film that director Adam Mason was shooting.

On August 20, 2018, the baseball team Seattle Mariners hosted a special "Alice in Chains Night" at the Safeco Field in Seattle to promote Rainier Fog, with the team offering the fans a package that included a Safeco Field terrace club ticket, access to a pre-game listening party of the album, an Alice in Chains T-shirt and a Rainier Fog CD. Jerry Cantrell also threw out the ceremonial first pitch and delivered a strike before the Seattle Mariners vs. Houston Astros game.

To mark the launch of the album, on August 21, 2018, Alice in Chains performed an acoustic set at the top of Seattle's Space Needle and debuted the song "Fly". Alice in Chains were the first band to perform on the Space Needle's new "Loupe" glass floor, the world's first and only revolving glass floor 500 feet high. The concert was exclusive for an audience of SiriusXM subscribers. SiriusXM broadcast the concert on their channel Lithium on August 31, 2018.

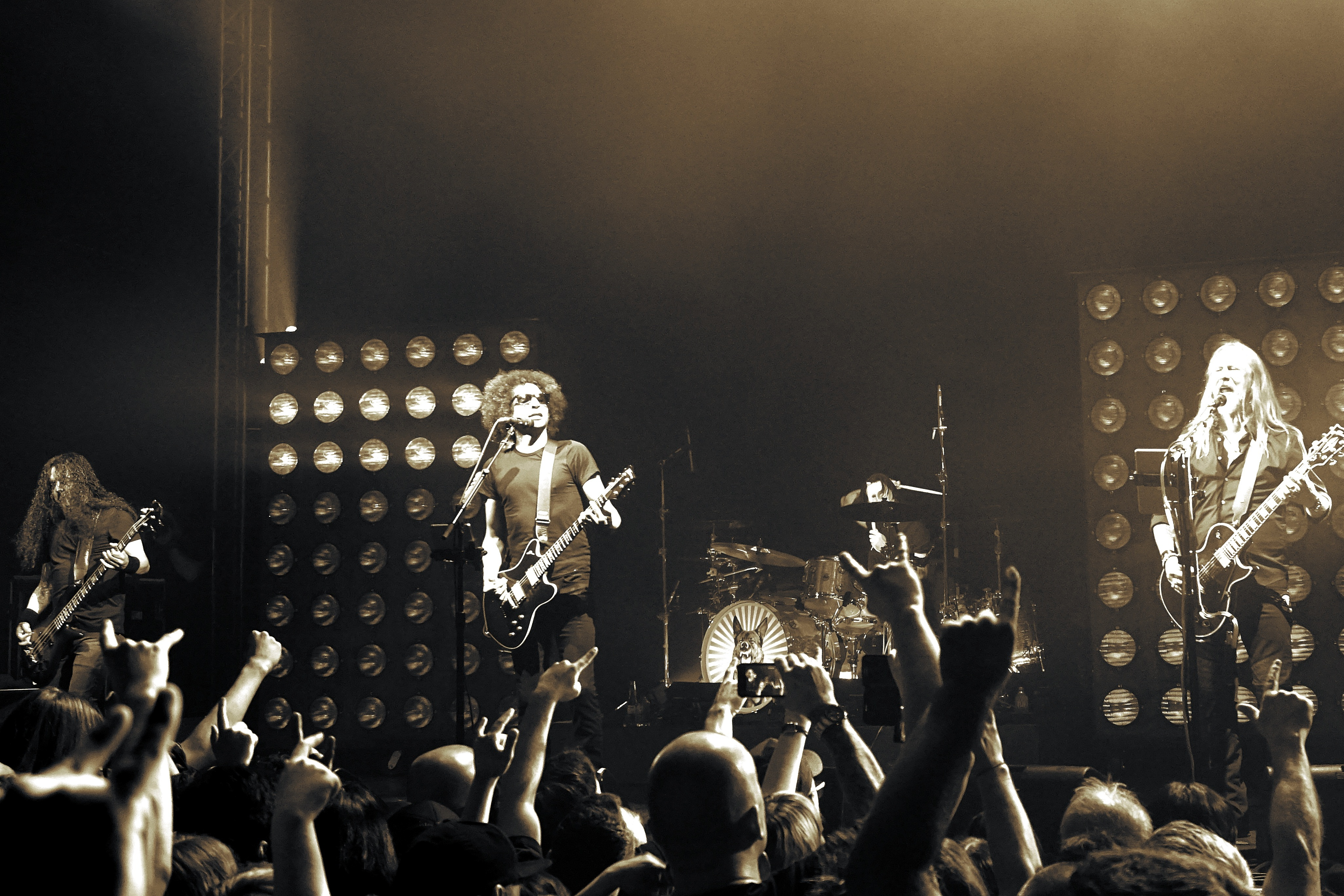
Alice in Chains performing in Leeds, England in 2018

On August 22, 2018, Alice in Chains sent fans on a scavenger hunt to access a secret gig that the band would be performing in Seattle on August 24. Ten signed CD copies of Rainier Fog were hidden around the city as a ticket into the show, and the band asked the fans to keep an eye on their Instagram story for details on the 10 hidden locations. Once all 10 albums were found, the band revealed that the secret gig would be at the rock club The Crocodile, with limited tickets available with the purchase of their album at a pop-up event at the same venue the next day. Preview clips of each of the album tracks were posted on the band's Instagram. The band also commemorated the release of the album with a pop-up museum installation at The Crocodile in Seattle on August 23 and 24. The museum featured rare Alice in Chains photos, limited-edition merchandise and memorabilia that showcased the band's 30+ year career.

Rainier Fog debuted at No. 12 on the Billboard 200 chart, selling 31,000 copies (29,000 in traditional album sales), in its first week of release. The album also debuted at No. 1 on Billboard's Top Rock Albums, Alternative Albums and Hard Rock Albums charts, and at No. 3 on the Vinyl Albums chart. Rainier Fog became Alice in Chains' first top 10 in the UK, peaking at No. 9, and topping UK's Rock & Metal Albums chart. The album has been nominated for a Grammy Award for Best Rock Album.

On December 13, 2018, the teaser of the film Black Antenna featuring the song "Rainier Fog" was released on Alice in Chains' official YouTube channel, with drummer Sean Kinney stating; "We've always toyed with the idea of creating videos for every song on one of our albums. Not only did we do that for Rainier Fog, it got totally out of hand and we made a whole goddamn movie. Everything that will be seen in the videos will be footage from Black Antenna to preface the complete film's release." "Rainier Fog" was released as a single on February 26, 2019. The official trailer for Black Antenna was released on Alice in Chains' YouTube Channel on February 28, 2019. Besides a 90-minute film, a 10-part web-series focused on each track from the album was planned. Episodes 1 and 2, "The One You Know" and "Rainier Fog", respectively, were released on March 7, 2019. The tenth and last episode, "All I Am", was released on July 17, 2019. The official music video for "Rainier Fog" was released on YouTube on May 15, 2019, and was co-directed by Alice in Chains and Peter Darley Miller, who also directed the band's 2013 mockumentary, AIC 23.

On December 1, 2020, Alice in Chains was honored with the Founders Award from Seattle's Museum of Pop Culture. The benefit concert featured tribute performances from artists such as Ann Wilson, Korn, Metallica, Fishbone, Dallas Green, Billy Corgan, Tad Doyle, members of Soundgarden and Pearl Jam, among others. The event was made available for streaming for free and raised more than $600,000 for the museum in its first night. A compilation featuring highlights from the tribute was made available for streaming on Amazon Music.

=== 2022–present: Potential seventh studio album, Kinney health issues and cancelled tour ===
In an April 2022 interview, vocalist William DuVall revealed that he was "sure" Alice in Chains would begin working on their seventh studio album later in the year:

We had a lot of time imposed on us and I think we're going through this period of catching up on things that we had planned for 2020 [and] 2021, and we're all finally getting to do that now. So, it's kind of like a stopgap and we're just dealing with all of these stockpiled projects that we had planned a few years back. So once we get back up to speed with things and we get these dates underway in late summer, I'm sure it will spark a whole bunch of ideas for the next Alice in Chains studio album.

However, in March 2023, DuVall stated there were "no plans" for new Alice in Chains music.

In February 2025, the band announced appearances at Welcome to Rockville in Daytona Beach, Florida, Sonic Temple in Columbus, Ohio, and MMR*B*Q, a festival hosted by WMMR in Camden, New Jersey, alongside three other headlining performances with Chained Saint, a thrash metal band from Florida. The tour was set to kick off at Mohegan Sun Arena in Montville, Connecticut on May 8, when Kinney suffered a medical emergency during soundcheck that evening. The band described the event as "non-life threatening" but were forced to cancel the show; two days later, the entire tour was scrapped. The band was advised Kinney's health issue needed "immediate attention" and he was unfit to perform the scheduled dates, though they stated "his long-term prognosis is positive."

In a September 2025 interview with Cleveland.com, Cantrell stated that Alice in Chains "had a tour planned for, like, right now that kind of fell through", adding, "So we had some bad luck; we planned on doing much more this year, but it just didn't work out." He also commented on the possibility of the band touring or recording a new album in 2026: "We'll take a look at it again probably early next year and figure out what we're gonna do, whether go in and make another record or do some shows—or both."

== Artistry ==
"Nutshell"
A sample of "Nutshell" from Unplugged. This song originally appeared on Jar of Flies and represents the unique acoustic sound Alice in Chains has created.

=== Musical style ===
Although Alice in Chains has been labeled grunge by the mainstream media, Jerry Cantrell identifies the band as primarily heavy metal. He told Guitar World in 1996, "We're a lot of different things ... I don't quite know what the mixture is, but there's definitely metal, blues, rock and roll, maybe a touch of punk. The metal part will never leave, and I never want it to." The Edmonton Journal has stated, "Living and playing in Seattle might have got them the grunge tag, but they've always pretty much been a classic metal band to the core." A 1995 review of Alice in Chains from People dubbed the band "Seattle's most malevolent-sounding grunge outfit."

Over the course of their career, the band's sound has also been described as alternative metal, sludge metal, alternative rock, doom metal, and hard rock. Furthermore, the band have also incorporated styles including blues rock, folk rock, progressive rock, funk metal and jangle pop into their music. Regarding the band's constant categorization by the media, Cantrell stated:

When we first came out we were metal. Then we started being called alternative metal. Then grunge came out and then we were hard rock. And now, since we've started doing this again I've seen us listed as: hard rock, alternative, alternative metal and just straight metal. I walked into an HMV the other day to check out the placement and see what's on and they've got us relegated back into the metal section. Right back where we started!

Drummer Sean Kinney rejects the grunge label, stating in a 2013 interview "I mean, before we first came out there was no grunge, they hadn't invented that word. Before they invented the word grunge we were alternative rock and alternative metal and metal and rock, and we didn't give a shit whatever, we were a rock and roll band!" According to Mike Inez, they were always the metal stepchildren of the Seattle scene.

=== Influences ===
The band is influenced to a great extent by English metal music; in 2018, Jerry Cantrell proclaimed Black Sabbath guitarist Tony Iommi as "one of his biggest" inspirations, while Layne Staley named his "first influences" as Black Sabbath and Deep Purple. The group's work with recording engineer Dave Jerden came about because upon meeting the band, recalling: "'Metallica took Tony Iommi and sped him up. What you've done is you've slowed him down again.' And [Cantrell] looked at me and said, 'You got it.' That's how I got the gig. I totally understood what they were doing." Cantrell adjudged English rock singer Elton John as "the artist that made me want to be a musician." In addition, members of Alice in Chains have cited artists including AC/DC, Accept, Aerosmith, the Beatles, Black Flag, David Bowie, John Coltrane, Miles Davis, Dio, Funkadelic, Hanoi Rocks, Heart, Jimi Hendrix, Iron Maiden, Jethro Tull, King's X, Kiss, Led Zeppelin, Lynyrd Skynyrd, Metallica, Steve Miller, Eddie Money, Motörhead, Mudhoney, Ted Nugent, Pink Floyd, the Pixies, Queen, Queensrÿche, the Rolling Stones, Rush, Scorpions, Soundgarden, the Stooges, Television, Thin Lizzy, Robin Trower, U2, UFO, Van Halen, the Velvet Underground, Hank Williams, and ZZ Top as influential or inspirational.

=== Instrumentation and lyrics ===
Jerry Cantrell's guitar style combines "pummeling riffs and expansive guitar textures" to create "slow, brooding minor-key grinds". He is also recognized for his natural ability to blend acoustic and electric guitars. While down-tuned, distorted guitars mixed with Staley's distinctive "snarl-to-a-scream" vocals appealed to heavy metal fans, the band also had "a sense of melody that was undeniable," which introduced Alice in Chains to a much wider audience outside of the heavy metal underground.

According to Stephen Thomas Erlewine of AllMusic, Alice in Chains' sound has a "Black Sabbath-style riffing and an unconventional vocal style." The band has been described by Erlewine as "hard enough for metal fans, yet their dark subject matter and punky attack placed them among the front ranks of the Seattle-based grunge bands." Three of the band's releases feature acoustic music, and while the band initially kept these releases separate, Alice in Chains' self-titled album combined the styles to form "a bleak, nihilistic sound that balanced grinding hard rock with subtly textured acoustic numbers."

Alice in Chains is also noted for the unique vocal harmonies of Staley (or DuVall) and Cantrell, which included overlapping passages, dual lead vocals, and trademark harmonies typically separated by a major third. Cantrell said it was Staley who gave him the self-assurance to sing his own songs. Alyssa Burrows said the band's distinctive sound "came from Staley's vocal style and his lyrics dealing with personal struggles and addiction." Staley's songs were often considered "dark", with themes such as drug abuse, depression, and suicide, while Cantrell's lyrics often dealt with personal relationships.

== Legacy ==
=== Rankings ===
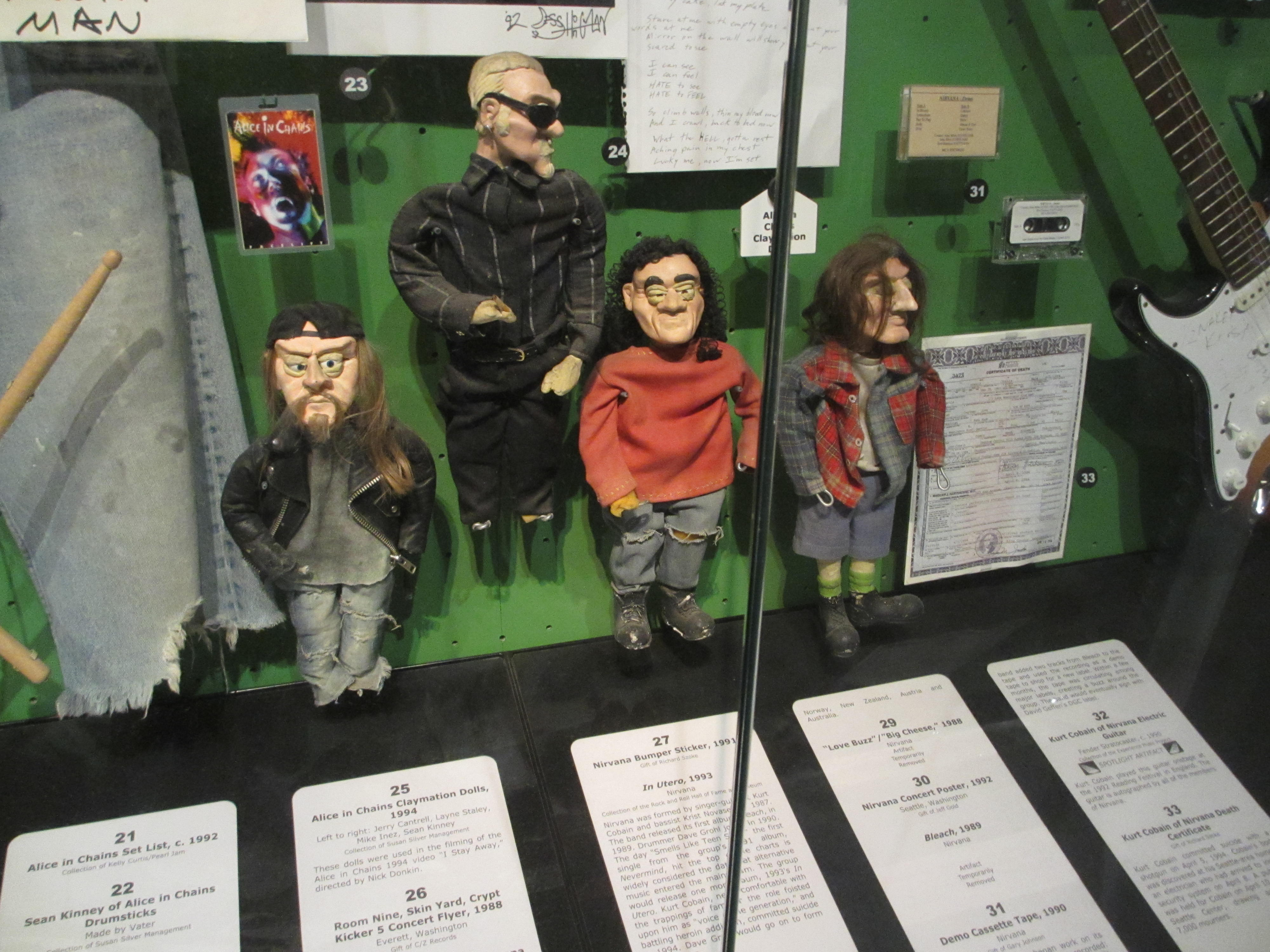
Alice in Chains' claymation dolls on display at the Rock and Roll Hall of Fame museum

Alice in Chains has sold over 30 million certified records in the United States, released two number-one albums, had 23 top 40 singles, and has received eleven Grammy Award nominations. The band was ranked number 34 on VH1's 100 Greatest Artists of Hard Rock. Alice in Chains was named 15th greatest live band by Hit Parader, with Staley placing as 27th-greatest heavy metal vocalist of all time. The band's second album, Dirt, was named 5th-best album in the last two decades by Close-Up magazine in 2008.

In October 2008, Guitar World ranked Cantrell's solo in "Man in the Box" at No. 77 on their list of "100 Greatest Guitar Solos". In August 2009, Alice in Chains won the Kerrang! Icon Award.

In November 2011, Jar of Flies was ranked number four on Guitar World magazine's top ten list of guitar albums of 1994. It was also featured in Guitar World magazine's "Superunknown: 50 Iconic Albums That Defined 1994" list, and in May 2014, the EP was placed at number five on Loudwire's "10 Best Hard Rock Albums of 1994" list.

In June 2017, Metal Injection ranked Alice in Chains at number 1 on their list of "10 Heaviest Grunge Bands". Ozzy Osbourne ranked Facelift among his list of "10 Favorite Metal Albums".

=== Influence ===
Alice in Chains are one of the most popular rock bands from the 1990s. Pantera and Damageplan guitarist Dimebag Darrell had expressed his admiration for Cantrell's guitar work in an interview for Guitar International in 1995, saying that "the layering and the honest feel that Jerry Cantrell gets on [Alice in Chains' Dirt] record is worth a lot more than someone who plays five million notes."

Street musician Wesley Willis wrote a song about the band entitled "Alice in Chains", featured on his 1996 album Feel The Power. Billy Corgan revealed that the song "Bleeding The Orchid" from the Smashing Pumpkins' 2007 album Zeitgeist has a bit of a homage to Alice in Chains in the harmonies and was indirectly inspired by the death of Staley.

Elton John stated that he is a fan of Alice in Chains and a big admirer of Cantrell. According to Jon Wiederhorn of MTV, Godsmack has "sonically followed Alice in Chains' lead while adding their own distinctive edge." Godsmack singer and founder Sully Erna has also cited Staley as his primary influence. Godsmack was named after the Alice in Chains song "God Smack" from the album Dirt. Staind has covered Alice in Chains' song "Nutshell" live, which appears on the compilation The Singles: 1996-2006, and also wrote a song entitled "Layne", dedicated to Staley, on the album 14 Shades of Grey. Three Days Grace also performs a cover of "Rooster", which can be seen on the DVD Live at the Palace. Other bands that have been influenced by Alice in Chains include 10 Years, Avenged Sevenfold, Breaking Benjamin, Bush, Creed, Dallas Green, Days of the New, Disturbed, Hoobastank, Incubus, Korn, Manic Street Preachers, Mudvayne, Nickelback, A Pale Horse Named Death, Puddle of Mudd, Queens of the Stone Age, Rains, Seether, Skunk Anansie, Smile Empty Soul, Stone Sour, Tantric, Taproot, and Theory of a Deadman. Metallica said they have always wanted to tour with the band, citing Alice in Chains as a major inspiration for their 2008 release, Death Magnetic.

Alice in Chains has also had a significant influence on modern heavy metal. Their songs were covered by various metal bands such as In Flames, Opeth, Dream Theater, Secrets of the Moon, Suicide Silence, 36 Crazyfists, Cane Hill, Ektomorf, Dritt Skitt, Grave and Thou, who described their 2018 EP Rhea Sylvia as "a melodic grunge, Alice in Chains homage." In 2009, Anders Fridén of Swedish melodic death metal band In Flames cited Layne Staley as an inspiration for his vocals on the band's later albums. In addition to fellow musicians, the band has also received praise from critics, with Steve Huey calling them "one of the best metal bands of the '90s" upon reviewing the 1999 compilation Nothing Safe.

In 2009, the Vitamin String Quartet released the album The String Quartet Tribute to Alice in Chains, featuring instrumental versions on viola, violin and cello of 12 of the band's biggest hits.

=== Media ===
In August 2015, journalist David de Sola published the biography Alice in Chains: The Untold Story. An updated version covering the period from 2014 to 2017 was published in November 2018. Neither the band nor their management had any involvement with the book. Sources tied directly to the band were interviewed instead.

The claymation dolls of the band members used in the music video for "I Stay Away" are on display at the Rock and Roll Hall of Fame museum in Cleveland, Ohio.

== Band members ==
Current members

- Jerry Cantrell – lead guitar, lead vocals and backing vocals (1987–2002, 2005–present), rhythm guitar (1987–2002, 2005)
- William DuVall – rhythm guitar, lead and backing vocals (2006–present)
- Mike Inez – bass (1993–2002, 2005–present), backing vocals (1993, 2005–present)
- Sean Kinney – drums, percussion (1987–2002, 2005–present); backing vocals (1989–1990)

Former members

- Layne Staley – lead vocals, occasional rhythm guitar (1987–2002; his death)
- Mike Starr – bass (1987–1993; died 2011); backing vocals (1987–1990)

== Discography ==
Studio albums

- Facelift (1990)
- Dirt (1992)
- Alice in Chains (1995)
- Black Gives Way to Blue (2009)
- The Devil Put Dinosaurs Here (2013)
- Rainier Fog (2018)
