= Bloodworth =

- Theatrical release poster
- Directed by: Shane Dax Taylor
- Written by: W. Earl Brown
- Based on: Provinces of Night by William Gay
- Produced by: Darryl Atwater; Kendi Atwater; W. Earl Brown; Kenneth Burke; T-Bone Burnett; Travis Nicholson; Corky Taylor; Shane Dax Taylor
- Starring: Val Kilmer; Kris Kristofferson; Hilary Duff; Dwight Yoakam; W. Earl Brown
- Cinematography: Tim Orr
- Edited by: Beguine Sanani
- Music by: Randy Scruggs; Patrick Warren
- Production companies: Dax Productions; Racer Entertainment; Buffalo Bulldog Films; Provinces of Night
- Distributed by: Samuel Goldwyn Films
- Release dates: February 6, 2010 (Santa Barbara); May 20, 2011 (United States)
- Running time: 105 minutes
- Country: United States
- Language: English
- Box office: $12,971

Bloodworth is a 2010 drama film directed by Shane Dax Taylor and based on Provinces of Night, a novel by William Gay. The film stars Val Kilmer, Kris Kristofferson, and Dwight Yoakam. Toby Keith was also set to star in the film, but later dropped out.

== Plot ==
It's been 40 years since E. F. Bloodworth (Kris Kristofferson) abandoned his loving wife and sons for a life on the road as a full-time traveling musician. Now at the end of the line, Bloodworth reappears, forced to reckon with the stale aftermath of his departure. With his ex-wife Julia (Frances Conroy) mentally destroyed and his three sons, Warren (Val Kilmer), Boyd (Dwight Yoakam) and Brady (W. Earl Brown) soured by years of anger toward both him and each other, Bloodworth's only solace is a budding relationship with Fleming, the grandson he never knew. But when Fleming meets Raven (Hilary Duff), the woman of his dreams, will Bloodworth's presence force history to repeat itself?

== Cast ==
- Val Kilmer as Warren Bloodworth
- Kris Kristofferson as E. F. Bloodworth
- Hilary Duff as Raven Lee Halfacre
- Reece Thompson as Fleming Bloodworth
- Dwight Yoakam as Boyd Bloodworth
- Frances Conroy as Julia Bloodworth
- W. Earl Brown as Brady Bloodworth
- Hilarie Burton as Hazel
- Sheila Kelley as Louise Halfacre
- Hank Williams III as "Trigger" Lipscomb
- Barry Corbin as "Itchy"

== Production ==
The film is directed by Shane Taylor and adapted from the novel, Provinces of Night, by William Gay. Kenny Burke produced the film with Taylor and Brown. Music producer T-Bone Burnett supervised the film's music, which includes original compositions by Kris Kristofferson.

Filming took place in April and May 2009 in Wilmington, North Carolina.

== Release ==
An early version of the film premiered at the 2010 Santa Barbara International Film Festival on February 6, 2010; it later screened as a work in progress at the 2010 Nashville Film Festival on April 15–22, 2010. The completed version of the film was part of the 17th Annual Austin Film Festival during October 21 to 28 in Austin, Texas. It is currently available as a part of the Netflix Instant Play.

== Reception ==
On Rotten Tomatoes the film has an approval rating of 50% based on reviews from 8 critics.
