= W. Earl Brown =

American actor, screenwriter, producer and musician (born 1963)

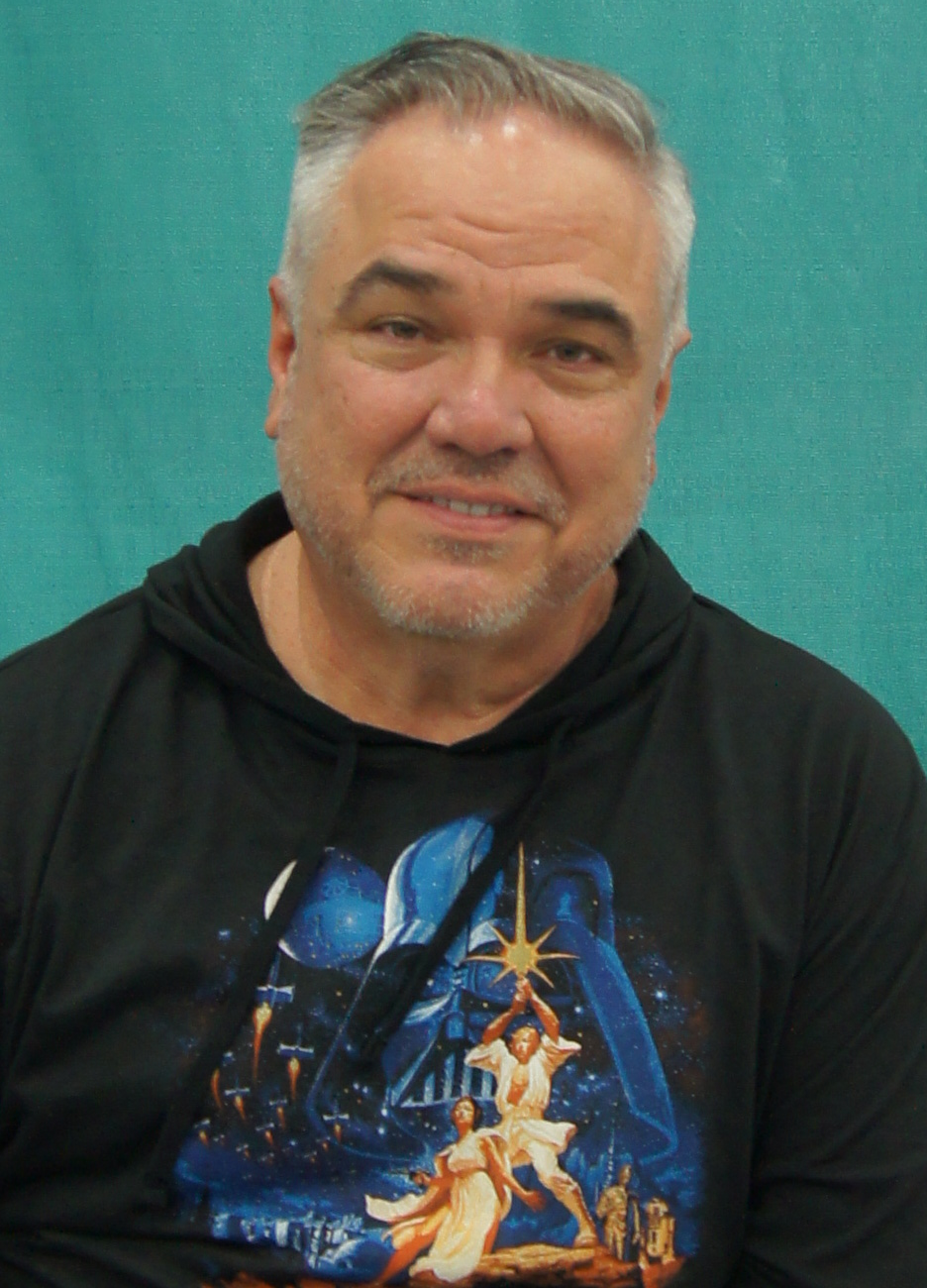
- Brown in 2011
- Born: William Earl Brown; September 7, 1963 (age 63); Golden Pond, Kentucky, U.S.
- Education: Murray State University (BA); DePaul University (MFA)
- Occupations: Actor; screenwriter; producer; musician; songwriter
- Years active: 1991–present
- Children: 1

William Earl Brown (born September 7, 1963) is an American actor, screenwriter, producer, musician, and songwriter. He is perhaps best known for his roles as the cameraman Kenny in the film Scream (1996), Warren in the film There's Something About Mary (1998), Dan Dority on the HBO series Deadwood (2004–2006), and the voice and motion capture of Bill in the video game The Last of Us (2013). He has appeared in films such as Backdraft (1991), Being John Malkovich (1999), Vanilla Sky (2001), Bloodworth (2010), which he also wrote and produced, The Sessions (2012), The Master (2012) and The Lone Ranger (2013). He has also appeared in series such as Seinfeld, NYPD Blue, CSI: Crime Scene Investigation, CSI: Miami, The X-Files, Six Feet Under, Preacher, Bates Motel, True Detective, American Horror Story, Chicago Fire, Psych, and The Mandalorian.

== Early life ==
Brown was born in Golden Pond, Kentucky. He earned a bachelor's degree from Murray State University before moving to Chicago, where he received an MFA from DePaul University Theatre School in 1989.

== Career ==
After his breakout performance in Steppenwolf Theatre Company's outreach staging of Arthur Miller's A View from the Bridge, Brown began working in television and film. He appeared in films such as Backdraft (1991), The Babe (1992), Excessive Force (1993), and Rookie of the Year (1993). In 1993, he moved to Los Angeles and was cast in Wes Craven's New Nightmare (1994). He also had a minor role in Craven's Vampire in Brooklyn (1995), and a bigger one as a news cameraman working for Gale Weathers in Craven's Scream (1996). He played Warren in the 1998 comedy film There's Something About Mary and later took roles in Being John Malkovich (1999), Dancing at the Blue Iguana (2000), Vanilla Sky (2001), The Alamo (2004), and The Big White (2005). In 2009, Brown wrote, produced, and appeared in the film Bloodworth. His 2010s film credits include The Sessions (2012), The Master (2012), The Lone Ranger (2013), Brother's Keeper (2013), and Wild (2014).

On television, he is best known for his portrayal of Dan Dority on the HBO series Deadwood (2004–2006). He has also guest starred on Bates Motel, Rectify, Luck, American Horror Story, Justified, Six Feet Under, NYPD Blue, X-Files, The Mentalist, CSI: Crime Scene Investigation, Ellen, Seinfeld, True Detective, and others. He also portrayed the singer Meat Loaf in VH1's television film Meat Loaf: To Hell and Back (2000). In 2013, he performed the voice and motion capture of Bill in the critically acclaimed video game The Last of Us.

Brown also writes and performs with the country music band Sacred Cowboys.

== Filmography ==
=== Film ===
Year	Title	Role	Notes
1991	Backdraft	Paramedic	
1992	The Babe	Herb Pennock	
1993	Rookie of the Year	Billy Frick (Bullpen Catcher)	
1993	Excessive Force	Vinnie DiMarco	
1994	Wes Craven's New Nightmare	Morgue Attendant	
1995	Without Evidence	Grace	
1995	Vampire in Brooklyn	'Thrasher'	
1996	Scream	Kenny	
1997	Kiss the Girls	Locksmith	
1998	Deep Impact	McCloud	
1998	There's Something About Mary	Warren Jensen	
1999	Being John Malkovich	J.M. Inc. Customer	
2000	Dancing at the Blue Iguana	Bobby	
2000	Lost Souls	William Kelson	
2001	Vanilla Sky	Barman	
2001	Sugar & Spice	Hank 'The Terminator' Rogers	
2003	Pauly Shore Is Dead	Bucky From Kentucky	
2003	Dunsmore	Ronny Roy Pritcher	
2004	Killer Diller	Holister	
2004	The Last Shot	Willie Gratzo	
2004	The Alamo	David Burnet	
2005	The Big White	Jimbo	
2005	Kids in America	Boss McGinn	
2010	Bloodworth	Brady Bloodworth	Also writer and producer
2010	The Last Rites of Ransom Pride	Matthew	
2011	Still Screaming: The Ultimate Scary Movie Retrospective	Himself	Documentary film
2012	The Sessions	Rod	
2012	The Master	Fighting Businessman	
2013	A Single Shot	Puffy	
2013	AIC 23	Alan Poole McLard	Short film, also co-writer
2013	The Lone Ranger	Mustached Ranger	
2013	Beneath the Harvest Sky	Roger	
2013	Knights of Badassdom	Randy	
2013	Brother's Keeper	Turner Monroe	
2014	Wild	Frank	
2014	Draft Day	Ralph Mowry	
2015	Chasing Ghosts	Roger Simons	
2015	Black Mass	Johnny Martorano	
2016	Porcupine	Owen Talbott	
2016	Spaceman	Dick Dennis	
2018	Dad Band	Jim Jimbo	Short film, also writer
2019	The Highwaymen	Ivy Methvin	
2021	No Man of God	Warden Wilkenson	
2021	The Unforgivable	Mac Whelan	
2023	The Dead Don't Hurt	Alan Kendall	
2024	Shirley	George Wallace	

=== Television ===
Year	Title	Role	Notes
1992	Angel Street	Patrolman	Unknown episode
1993	The Untouchables	Jack Zuta	2 episodes
1993	The Woman Who Loved Elvis	Pete	Television film
1993	Bakersfield P.D.	Hood	Episode: "The Ex-Partner"
1994	Seinfeld	Al	Episode: "The Stand In"
1994	Murder, She Wrote	Guard	Episode: "Murder of the Month Club"
1994	Lily in Winter	Sheriff Boyd	Television film
1995	Ellen	Customer #3	Episode: "Gladiators"
1995	The Single Guy	The Cabbie	Episode: "Neighbors"
1995	Nowhere Man	Roy	Episode: "It's Not Such a Wonderful Life"
1996	Project ALF	Ernie	Television film
1996	A Season in Purgatory	Fatty Malloy	Television film
1996	Caroline in the City	Floyd Gerber	Episode: "Caroline and the Therapist"
1996	The Cherokee Kid	Calloway	Television film
1997	Diagnosis: Murder	Dusty Wilton	Episode: "Murder, Country Style"
1997	Smart Guy	Sonny	Episode: "The Dating Game"
1997	Bella Mafia	Fredrico Luciano	Television film
1998	Profiler	Raymond Boudreaux	Episode: "The Sum of Her Parts"
1999	Martial Law	Larry Gambozza	Episode: "Big Trouble"
2000	Chicago Hope	Harry Cram	Episode: "Cold Hearts"
2000	NYPD Blue	Bruce Rhodes	Episode: "Welcome to New York"
2000	Meat Loaf: To Hell and Back	Meat Loaf	Television film
2000	Angel	Menlo	Episode: "The Shroud of Rahmon"
2001	CSI	Roger Peet	Episode: "Justice Is Served"
2001	Charmed	Shadow / Familiar Warlock	Episode: "Pre-Witched"
2001	Dead Last	Victor Korsky	Episode: "The Problem with Corruption"
2001	WANTED COMIX	Drew Lujan	Episode: "Frank and Beans"
2001	Wolf Lake	Bruce Cates	Episode: "Excitable Boy"
2002	Philly	Billy Temple	Episode: "Brotherly Love"
2002	The X-Files	Robert M. Fassl	Episode: "Underneath"
2002	Six Feet Under	Pete	Episode: "It's the Most Wonderful Time of the Year"
2002	Push, Nevada	Shadrach	5 episodes
2003	NYPD Blue	Terry Parkhurst	Episode: "22 Skidoo"
2004	Cold Case	Victor Lake	Episode: "Maternal Instincts"
2004–06	Deadwood	Dan Dority	36 episodes; also wrote one episode
2005	CSI: Miami	Jesse Kramer	Episode: "Whacked"
2006	Standoff	Doug Frohmer	Episode: "Man of Steele"
2007	Numbers	Abner Stone	Episode: "Nine Wives"
2007	Psych	Dwayne Tancana	Episode: "Bounty Hunters!"
2007	The Minister of Divine	'Buzz'	Unsold pilot
2008	The Mentalist	Rulon Farnes	Episode: "Redwood"
2009	Hawthorne	Mr. Deegan	Episode: "Trust Me"
2009	CSI	'Slick'	Episode: "Appendicitement"
2010	Justified	Cal Wallace	Episode: "Blowback "
2010	Miami Medical	Jesse	Episode: "Medicine Man"
2011	American Horror Story: Murder House	Phil Critter	Episode: "Smoldering Children"
2011	Burn Notice	Zechariah	Episode: "Besieged"
2011	Breakout Kings	Cliff Krauss	Episode: "Paid in Full"
2011	Scream: The Inside Story	Himself	Documentary film
2012	Luck	Mulligan	2 episodes
2012	Blue Eyed Butcher	Thomas Dean	Television film
2012	Perception	Frank Prentice	Episode: "Faces"
2012	Major Crimes	Jim Martino	Episode: "Before and After"
2013	The Sixth Gun	General Oliander Hume	Unsold pilot
2013	Bates Motel	Keith Summers	Episode: "First You Dream, Then You Die"
2013	Rectify	The Stranger	Episode: "Drip, Drip"
2013	Rogue	Charlie	5 episodes
2013	Longmire	R.J. Watts	Episode: "The Road to Hell"
2014	Ground Floor	'Digger' Tomkins	Episode: "Dynamic Duo"
2014	Grey's Anatomy	Herb Cramer	Episode: "Throwing It All Away"
2014	Chicago Fire	Dave Bloom	3 episodes
2015	American Crime	Tom Carlin	10 episodes
2015	True Detective	Detective Teague Dixon	5 episodes
2015	Documentary Now!	Mitch Dragando	Episode: "Gentle and Soft: The Story of the Blue Jean Committee, Part 1"
2015	Wicked City	Captain Dan Wilkinson	4 episodes
2016	Archer	Head Biker (voice)	Episode: "The Handoff"
2016–17	Preacher	Hugo Root	11 episodes
2017	Training Day	Chief Wade	Episode: "Wages of Sin"
2017	I'm Dying Up Here	Teddy	7 episodes
2017–18	Superstition	The Dredge	3 episodes
2019	Deadwood: The Movie	Dan Dority	Television film
2019	Reprisal	Witt	7 episodes
2020	Hoops	(voice)	Episode: "The Scout"
2020	The Mandalorian	Taanti	Episode: "Chapter 9: The Marshal"
2022	The Book of Boba Fett	Taanti	2 episodes
2022	Hacks	Michael	7 episodes
2022	Five Days at Memorial	Ewing Cook	7 episodes
2023	Paul T. Goldman	Royce Rocco	4 episodes
2023	Hello Tomorrow!	Big Fred	6 episodes
2023	The Ghost and Molly McGee	Lord Doom (voice)	2 episodes
2024	Yellowstone	Deputy Spears	Episode: "Desire Is All You Need"
2025–present	Fire Country	Wes Fox	Guest role (2 episodes)
2025–present	Sheriff Country	Wes Fox	Main role
2026	The Boys	Greg Dupree	Episode: One-Shots

=== Video games ===
Year	Title	Role	Notes
2013	The Last of Us	Bill	Voice and motion capture
2025	The Last of Us Part II Remastered	Bill	No Return mode
