= Voices (Alice in Chains song) =

2013 single by Alice in Chains

Single by Alice in Chains

from the album The Devil Put Dinosaurs Here
- Released: July 26, 2013 (Internet); July 29, 2013 (Radio); August 13, 2013 (CD single)
- Studio: Henson Recording Studios; Los Angeles, California
- Length: 5:42 (album version); 4:47 (radio edit)
- Label: Virgin/EMI
- Songwriter: Jerry Cantrell
- Producers: Nick Raskulinecz, Alice in Chains

Alice in Chains singles chronology
"Stone" (2013)	"Voices" (2013)	"Tears" (2016)

Music video
- "Voices" on YouTube

"Voices" is a song by the American rock band Alice in Chains and the third single from their fifth studio album, The Devil Put Dinosaurs Here (2013). Guitarist/vocalist Jerry Cantrell takes lead vocals on the song. The single premiered exclusively on USA Today website on July 26, 2013, and was released to radio stations on July 29, 2013. "Voices" peaked at No. 3 on Billboard's Mainstream Rock Tracks, and stayed on the chart for 20 weeks. It also peaked at No. 18 on the Rock Airplay chart.

== Song ==
The song was the first to be written for the album The Devil Put Dinosaurs Here. It was penned by singer-guitarist Jerry Cantrell in 2011 before he went into hospital for a procedure to repair a damaged shoulder cartilage. He told Grammy.com in 2013:

Before I had the surgery I think I demoed 'Voices' really quick, that was a kind of quick song and came together within a couple of days of just me messing around here at the house. It was right after tour and it was a good, strong song and so I sent it around to everybody and everybody liked it and I thought, 'F--k, that's good.' That was the first thing that came together on the record, so I knew there was a good song there.

Cantrell takes lead vocals on the song. He told USA Today about expanding his role as a lead vocalist in the band:

It's been a natural progression. Alice has always been a band that requires two of us, two guys to make one. It's a continuation of what we are and who we continue to be.

== Release and reception ==
The radio edit of "Voices" premiered on USA Today website on July 26, 2013, and it was released to radio stations on July 29, 2013.

Consequence of Sound called the song "the record's best cut". "[Voices] provides that classic moment when Alice forces the listener to rethink what a metal band can do. Rusty fence-wire strumming and disaffected singing suddenly propel into a gorgeous, textured swirl of voices around Cantrell’s foreground vocal of “Everybody listen/ Voices in my head.” It's that moment when the camera goes through the earhole, and we get to see the volatile chemistry really taking place in someone's mind." Metal Storm said; ""Voices" contains introspective and mildly depressive lyrics that you expect from Alice In Chains. The hypnotic tones coupled with the lyrics make "Voices" a homerun." Loudwire said; "The song, which features trademark harmonizing between Cantrell and William DuVall along with a more acoustic flare, is one of the album's standout cuts and seems destined for radio play.

== Music video ==
The lyric video for "Voices" was released on the YouTube on July 25, 2013, with the official video following on September 5. Both videos were directed by Robert Schober, also known as Roboshobo.

Of the music video, on-line music magazine Loudwire commented:

Accompanying the haunting melodies of "Voices," pushed further by a vocal structure led by Jerry Cantrell, comes an equally haunting music video. Alice in Chains performed the song in a room illuminated by chandeliers and wayward light bulbs while on the outside, the lyrics sung by Cantrell and William DuVall occupy a somewhat bleak cityscape through neon letters.

The video was filmed in Seattle, with neon signs of the song's lyrics placed throughout the city in some of the places that are special to the band, such as The Crocodile club, The Comet Tavern and The Central Saloon. The video also features pictures of the band's former lead singer, Layne Staley, and of Nirvana's frontman, Kurt Cobain, at the 2:20 mark.

== Track listing ==
CD Single (CAPF430062)

1. "Voices" (radio edit) – 4:47

== Personnel ==
- Jerry Cantrell – lead vocals, lead guitar
- William DuVall – backing vocals, rhythm guitar
- Sean Kinney – drums
- Mike Inez – bass guitar

== Chart positions ==
Chart (2013)	Peak position
Canada Rock (Billboard)	5
US Mainstream Rock (Billboard)	3
US Rock & Alternative Airplay (Billboard)	18
