= Stone (Alice in Chains song) =

Single by Alice in Chains

from the album The Devil Put Dinosaurs Here
- Released: March 25, 2013
- Recorded: 2012
- Studio: Henson (Hollywood, California)
- Genre: Sludge metal; alternative rock; post-metal
- Length: 4:23
- Label: Virgin/EMI
- Songwriter: Jerry Cantrell
- Producers: Nick Raskulinecz; Alice in Chains

Alice in Chains singles chronology
| "Hollow" (2012) | "Stone" (2013) | "Voices" (2013) |

Music video
- "Stone" on YouTube

"Stone" is a song by American rock band Alice in Chains. It was released on March 25, 2013, as the second single from the band's fifth studio album, The Devil Put Dinosaurs Here (2013). The song reached No. 1 on Billboard's Mainstream Rock chart, and stayed on the chart for 20 weeks.

== Origin and recording ==
Singer-guitarist Jerry Cantrell came up with the song's riff whilst recovering from surgery to repair his damaged shoulder cartilage in 2011. He told Ultimate Guitar: "My arm was fucked up and I couldn't play guitar so I just hummed that riff into a phone and that's how that song came to be. When I could play a little bit and we were going through riffs, I remember doing some riffs with Paul Figueroa, our engineer. I'm like, 'Wait a minute, I got a good one, man. Check this out.' I started fuckin' playing it to him and it was me singing into the fuckin' phone. I'm like, 'Dude, this riff is killer. Give me a guitar and I'll fuckin' work it out.' So that song I actually came up with just off a voice message on a phone. I didn't even have a guitar; I just fuckin' hummed it into the phone."

The brooding song includes the lyric: "What makes you want to carve your initials in me?... Find me distant, outwardly rough obscene." Singer William DuVall explained to Los Angeles Times: "It seems to be about confronting outside misperceptions. You think you know me? You don't."

== Release and reception ==
"Stone" was released to radio stations on March 25, 2013.

According to Graham Hartmann writing for Loudwire, "the new single [...] has its fair share of sludge [...], further delving into a dark and unnerving side of alternative rock and atmospheric metal."

In 2019, the riff to "Stone" - that Cantrell hummed into his phone while recovering from a shoulder surgery - was ranked No. 16 on Guitar World's list of the 20 best guitar riffs of the decade.

== Music video ==
A lyric video for "Stone" was released on YouTube on April 15, 2013. The music video for "Stone" was shot in Lucerne Valley, California and directed by Robert Schober (aka Roboshobo), who directed their previous music video, "Hollow". The video features the band playing on a rocky hill. Separately, three individuals are alone trying to transport stones that get heavier or larger, using a basket, a cart, and one rolling a boulder uphill. Once they are unable to proceed, they stop and become stones.

== Live performances ==
On April 10, 2013, the song was performed live during an Alice in Chains' appearance on Jimmy Kimmel Live!.

== Charts ==
=== Weekly charts ===
Weekly chart performance for "Stone"
| Chart (2013) | Peak Position |
|---|---|
| Canada Rock (Billboard) | 11 |
| US Hot Rock & Alternative Songs (Billboard) | 37 |
| US Rock & Alternative Airplay (Billboard) | 11 |

=== Year-end charts ===
Year-end chart performance for "Stone"
| Chart (2013) | Position |
|---|---|
| US Rock Airplay (Billboard) | 42 |
