= Hollow (Alice in Chains song) =

Single by Alice in Chains

from the album The Devil Put Dinosaurs Here
- Released: December 18, 2012
- Studio: Henson Recording Studios, Hollywood
- Genre: Grunge; sludge metal; doom metal
- Length: 5:43
- Label: Virgin; EMI
- Songwriter: Jerry Cantrell
- Producers: Nick Raskulinecz; Alice in Chains

Alice in Chains singles chronology
"Lesson Learned" (2010)	"Hollow" (2012)	"Stone" (2013)

Alternative cover
- Artwork used for the initial online release of the song's fan lyric YouTube video in December 2012.

Music video
- "Hollow" on YouTube

"Hollow" is a song by American rock band Alice in Chains and the first single from their fifth studio album, The Devil Put Dinosaurs Here, released on May 28, 2013. The band debuted the song on YouTube with a fan-made lyric video on December 18, 2012. The lyric video contains static images submitted by fans via Instagram. The song was made available for digital download on January 8, 2013. "Hollow" reached number one on Billboard's Mainstream Rock Tracks (their fourth song to do so) and stayed on the chart for 20 weeks. It is played in a 6/4 time signature during the verses, and in a standard 4/4 signature during the choruses.

== Origin ==
Asked by Music Radar if he worked out the phrasing over time or if it was immediate, Jerry Cantrell said of the riff:

"That one was pretty immediate. It came about on the last night of the Black Diamond Skye tour we did [in 2010], our headlining run with the Deftones and Mastodon. It was the very last show, we were in Vegas and I was sick as hell - I was about a click above pneumonia. But I was warming up in my dressing room, and I started playing that riff. Right away, I knew it was a good one to store away for later, so I recorded it. Nick [Raskulinecz] happened to be at that show, and so were my managers. Everybody perked up when they heard me playing it. 'What's that? That's pretty good!' [Laughs] I was like, 'Yeah, it is.' So I tucked it away. It was pretty immediate the way it came to me."

Cantrell said of the song during an interview with Ultimate Guitar in 2013:

We didn't intend for it to do what it's done and that's all the more the better. It's just like, "F--k that's cool." It's like a six-minute kind of sludgy metal song and it ended up being a number one f--kin' single. We didn't intend on it being a single. We put that song out for our fans as a taste and get them involved in helping us make a lyric video for it. We put it out on our own and we didn't really serve it to radio until radio started to call us and then we started sending it to 'em. It just kinda got a head of steam and started rolling so it was way cool. Very cool and very proud of that and completely organic.

== Style ==
The website Musically Diversified describes "Hollow" as "a mix of stoner or doom metal and grunge" that "starts off with some feedback that soon launches into a very chorus-soaked grunge riff that is accompanied by heavy drums and bass. This intro section]concludes and the song goes into a very sludge or stoner metal-influenced verse where the instruments chug along at a very lethargic pace that is kept tight by the rhythm section of Mike Inez and Sean Kinney. But then the chorus comes in and picks up things with Jerry Cantrell and William DuVall's harmonized vocals. This sequence repeats itself one more time and then the listener gets a great guitar solo at 3:43. This solo continues until we hit another verse and chorus which marks the end of the song."

== Music video ==
An official music video was made for the song by director Robert Schober (aka Roboshobo), premiered on the band's official website on January 10, 2013. The video depicts the daily routine of an astronaut (played by Ian Mackay) orbiting around earth whilst performing various floral experiments on the ship. He is shown often chatting to his significant other (played by Eli Jane) on Earth via video calling. As the video progresses, and his tenure in orbit turns from months into years, the astronaut slowly but steadily tires of his mundane routine, leading to emotional conflict with his significant other and suffering a mental breakdown. Near the end of the video, having completely lost his mind, and a visible tumor on his neck, the astronaut takes a flamethrower and destroys the experiments on board, which leads to the entire ship catching fire and crumbling with him inside.

== Awards and nominations ==
Award nominations for "Hollow"
Year	Nominee / work	Award	Result
2014	Randy Staub	Juno Award for Recording Engineer of the Year	Nominated

== Personnel ==
- Jerry Cantrell – lead vocals, lead guitar
- William DuVall – backing vocals, rhythm guitar
- Mike Inez – bass
- Sean Kinney – drums

== Charts ==
=== Weekly charts ===
Weekly chart performance for "Hollow"
Chart (2013)	Peak position
Canada Rock (Billboard)	4
US Hot Rock & Alternative Songs (Billboard)	37
US Rock & Alternative Airplay (Billboard)	10

=== Year-end charts ===
Year-end chart performance for "Hollow"
Chart (2013)	Position
US Rock Airplay (Billboard)	35
