= Brighten =

Studio album by Jerry Cantrell
- Released: October 29, 2021
- Recorded: March 10, 2020 – March 4, 2021
- Studio: Dave's Room Recording Studio in North Hollywood, California
- Genres: Alternative rock; hard rock; post-grunge; country rock
- Length: 40:42
- Label: Double J Music
- Producers: Jerry Cantrell; Tyler Bates

Jerry Cantrell chronology
Degradation Trip Volumes 1 & 2 (2002)	Brighten (2021)	I Want Blood (2024)

Singles from Brighten
- 1. "Atone" Released: July 29, 2021; 2. "Brighten" Released: September 10, 2021; 3. "Siren Song" Released: October 21, 2021

Brighten is the third solo album by Alice in Chains guitarist and vocalist Jerry Cantrell. Released on October 29, 2021, it is his first independent album as well as his first solo album in 19 years, since 2002's Degradation Trip Volumes 1 & 2. In addition to singing, Cantrell also played guitar, bass and keyboards on the album. He described the album as "a journey up through darkness to light".

Cantrell produced the album along with Tyler Bates. It also features Duff McKagan on bass, Gil Sharone on drums, Greg Puciato on background vocals, Abe Laboriel Jr. on drums, Tyler Bates on strings, percussion and guitar, Vincent Jones on piano, keyboards and strings, Jordan Lewis on piano, and Michael Rozon on pedal steel. The last track is a cover of Elton John's "Goodbye", which John himself approved.

The album's first single, "Atone", was released on July 29, 2021. The second single, "Brighten", was released on September 10, 2021. The third single, "Siren Song", was released on October 21, 2021.

== Background and recording ==
On January 24, 2020, during an interview for People TV on the red carpet of the MusiCares Person of the Year ceremony, Cantrell announced that he was working on a solo album. He started recording at Dave's Room Recording Studio in North Hollywood, Los Angeles on March 10, 2020. On March 4, 2021, Cantrell announced via his Instagram page that he had completed the album, captioning the photo: "Finished my record tonight one year to the day from when we started recording it. What a crazy journey... always is. Look forward to setting it free upon your ear holes sometime soon."

Producer Tyler Bates previously worked with Cantrell on the song "A Job to Do", featured on the soundtrack to the 2017 film John Wick: Chapter 2, and on the song "Setting Sun", written for the soundtrack of DC Comics' graphic novel Dark Nights: Metal. Bates helped put a band together for Cantrell's solo concerts at the Pico Union Project in Los Angeles on December 6 and 7, 2019, and some of those musicians are also featured on Brighten, such as Greg Puciato, Gil Sharone, Jordan Lewis and Michael Rozon. Drummer Gil Sharone had worked with Cantrell on "A Job to Do" and "Setting Sun". Sharone recommended his former The Dillinger Escape Plan bandmate, Greg Puciato, as a backing vocalist for Cantrell's solo concerts in December 2019, and after that experience, Cantrell invited him to participate on the album.

Cantrell originally intended to release Brighten in September 2020, but had to postpone it due to the COVID-19 pandemic. Looking back on that period, Cantrell said, "We worked in really small groups, just tried to be careful, masking up and keeping clean. Luckily we got through the process with nobody getting sick, and it gave me something to focus on during a pretty uncertain time. We came out the other side with a really great record."

Although Gil Sharone played drums in half of the album, Paul McCartney's drummer, Abe Laboriel Jr. was suggested by the album's mixer, Joe Barresi, to get a different feel for some of the other songs. "It wasn't that Gil didn't have great performances, but in his words, he said, 'I think this is like a '70s record, so you should have as many players with different feels on different songs, that's just the way that is.' And I think it only benefited [from] having that", Cantrell recalled it. Due to the COVID-19 restrictions and lockdown, Laboriel Jr. couldn't travel to Los Angeles to record the tracks, so recorded his drum tracks in New York where he was locked down.

Cantrell originally wanted Tom Petty and the Heartbreakers's keyboardist Benmont Tench to play keyboards on "Siren Song". Tench was interested in playing in the song, but something happened and he couldn't do it, so Vincent Jones ended up replacing him.

On June 29, 2021, after low quality photos were leaked from a music video shoot, it was reported that Guns N' Roses' bassist Duff McKagan would be featured on Cantrell's new solo album. Cantrell confirmed McKagan's collaboration the next day by posting higher quality behind-the-scenes photos from the music video shoot that also showed Gil Sharone on drums and Greg Puciato on guitar and vocals on the set.

== Music and lyrics ==
The album features eight original songs and closes with a cover of Elton John's "Goodbye", the last track on John's 1971 album, Madman Across the Water, which is one of Cantrell's favorite Elton John albums. Cantrell performed the song at the end of his two solo concerts at the Pico Union Project in Los Angeles on December 6 and 7, 2019. Cantrell sent John a demo tape with the song and asked for his permission to use it on the album. "I sent Elton the demo; I just wanted to make sure he was cool with it, make sure I didn't butcher his tune, and he was like, 'No, man, it's beautiful, you did a great job, you absolutely should use it.' So it was great to get that information from him, that he was okay with what I did with his tune. Out of respect to Elton, I wouldn't include it unless he said it was okay. He'd played piano on 'Black Gives Way To Blue', which I wrote for Layne, so I reached out to Elton, he listened to it, and told me "You should absolutely use it." I got the signoff by the man himself. I couldn't think of a better way to close the record!", Cantrell said. Cantrell said that the title track, "Brighten", is his favorite song from the album.

Brighten incorporates elements from Cantrell's musical influences from the 1960s to the 1990s. Cantrell described Prism of Doubt as "Steve Miller mixed with a little Frank Black/Pixies". The track "Dismembered" has been compared to the Rolling Stones' 1972 album Exile on Main St. and Cantrell has acknowledged that the record showcased "a little Stones, a little Creedence [Creedence Clearwater Revival]".

== Promotion and touring ==
On July 28, 2021, Cantrell posted a teaser trailer in his social media announcing that a new song and video titled "Atone" would be released on July 29. The song and music video premiered exclusively on the Rolling Stone website. On August 23, 2021, Cantrell announced a North American tour, beginning on March 24, 2022 through May 8, 2022.

The second single, "Brighten", was released via streaming and digital download on September 10, 2021. The music video for the single premiered exclusively on the Consequence of Sound website. The third single, "Siren Song", was released via streaming and digital download on October 21, 2021. An animated music video for the single was released on March 16, 2022.

== Release ==
Brighten was released via streaming and digital download on October 29, 2021. The CD and vinyl were made available for pre-order on Jerry Cantrell's official website, but a week before it was originally scheduled to be released, the release date of the physical album was changed from October 29, 2021 to November 19, 2021, and later changed again to November 5, 2021.

== Critical reception ==
Metacritic gives the album a score of 85/100. Kerrang!'s Sam Law rated the album 4/5: "Brighten's vivid, contemporary self-portrait of one of the most distinctive voices in hard rock is complete. A long-overdue show of individual brilliance."

Louder's Neil Jeffries gave the album a rating of 4/5 saying, "the third solo album by Alice In Chains guitarist Jerry Cantrell is his best yet: the work of a songwriter who is happy in his life. The music within Brighten is full of AIC archetypes, not least Cantrell's distinctive vocals, but spans a broad arc of styles… making it all the more remarkable that he appears comfortable in all of them.", and that "Alice In Chains fans should prepare to love this, but expect more echoes of Jar of Flies than of Dirt..."

Wall of Sound's Duane James scored the release 10/10 and said, "Brighten is an exceptionally crafted album, done so by one of the finest songwriters and musicians to grace any genre over the last 30+ years. A true icon, he's enlisted the finest talent to accompany him and the outcome is sublime."

=== Accolades ===
Publication	Accolade	Rank
Consequence	Top Metal & Hard Rock Albums	11
Guitar World	The 20 Best Guitar Albums of 2021	18
Ultimate Classic Rock	Top 40 Best Albums of 2021	19
Ultimate Classic Rock	Top 10 Hard Rock and Metal Albums of 2021	4

== Track listing ==
All tracks are written by Jerry Cantrell, except where noted.

No.	Title	Writer(s)	Length
1.	"Atone"		4:13
2.	"Brighten"		4:45
3.	"Prism of Doubt"		3:52
4.	"Black Hearts and Evil Done"		6:02
5.	"Siren Song"		5:00
6.	"Had to Know"		5:02
7.	"Nobody Breaks You"		5:03
8.	"Dismembered"		4:51
9.	"Goodbye"	Elton John, Bernie Taupin	1:54
Total length:			40:42

== Personnel ==
Musicians

- Jerry Cantrell – lead vocals, lead guitar, bass, keyboards
- Greg Puciato – background vocals
- Duff McKagan – bass guitar
- Gil Sharone – drums
- Abe Laboriel Jr. – drums
- Tyler Bates – strings, percussion, guitar
- Vincent Jones – piano, keyboards, strings
- Jordan Lewis – piano
- Michael Rozon – pedal steel
- Lola Bates – background vocals

Production

- Jerry Cantrell – producer
- Tyler Bates – producer
- Joe Barresi – mixer
- Paul Figueroa – engineer

== Charts ==
Chart performance for Brighten
Chart (2021–2022)	Peak position
Australian Albums (ARIA)	63
UK Rock & Metal Albums (Official Charts)	30
