= Setting Sun (Jerry Cantrell song) =

2018 song by Jerry Cantrell

Single by Jerry Cantrell

from the EP Dark Nights: Metal soundtrack
- Released: July 19, 2018
- Recorded: April 2018 in Los Angeles
- Length: 4:30
- Label: Warner Bros. Records
- Songwriter(s): Jerry Cantrell, Mike Elizondo, Tyler Bates
- Producer(s): Mike Elizondo, Tyler Bates

Jerry Cantrell singles chronology
"A Job to Do" (2017)	"Setting Sun" (2018)	"Vilified" (2024)

"Setting Sun" is a song by American rock musician Jerry Cantrell, written for the soundtrack of DC Comics' graphic novel Dark Nights: Metal. The song was written by Cantrell, Mike Elizondo and Tyler Bates, and was released as a single through digital platforms on July 19, 2018. The soundtrack featuring "Setting Sun" was released exclusively on a 12-inch vinyl picture disc on September 28, 2018, accompanied by a poster and a 32-page comic book.

== Release ==
The song was released on Warner Bros. Records' official YouTube channel on July 19, 2018, and it was also made available for streaming and digital download via Spotify, iTunes, Apple Music, Google Play and Deezer.

== Personnel ==
- Jerry Cantrell – vocals, guitar
- Tyler Bates – guitar
- Mike Elizondo – bass guitar
- Gil Sharone – drums
- Henry Lunetta – keyboards

Production

- Produced by Mike Elizondo, Tyler Bates
- Engineered by Paul Figueroa
- Assistant engineered by Alonzo Lazaro
- Edited by Henry Lunetta
- Mastered by Chris Gehringer
- Mixed by Adam Hawkins
