= Vilified =

Song by Jerry Cantrell

Single by Jerry Cantrell

from the album I Want Blood
- Released: July 26, 2024
- Studio: JHOC Studio, Pasadena, California
- Length: 4:31
- Label: Double J
- Songwriter: Jerry Cantrell
- Producer: Joe Barresi

Jerry Cantrell singles chronology
"Setting Sun" (2018)	"Vilified" (2024)

"Vilified" is a song by American rock musician Jerry Cantrell. It was released as the lead single from his 2024 solo album, I Want Blood.

== Composition and lyrics ==
Vilified's lyrics are a negative personification of artificial intelligence, referring to misinformation it may spread.

Cantrell mentioned to Kerrang! in a 2024 interview regarding the song and I Want Blood: "...AI is a boogeyman we’ve grown up with, but now we’re living in a time that it’s becoming a reality to more of an extent. It’s weird to me. I get it, as it’s a progression of technology and our use of it, but it’s part of the conversation of our lives and the world... ...It’s like any tool – you can take a hammer and bash somebody’s head in, or you can build a house – it’s up to the user. There’s still a human element there, of intention and responsibility."

== Music video ==
The music video for "Vilified" released on July 31, 2024. It features Cantrell performing the song, alongside surreal narrative footage to complement the lyrics.

The video was directed by Lorenzo Diego.

== Charts ==
Chart (2024)	Peak position
US Mainstream Rock (Billboard)	10

== Personnel ==
- Jerry Cantrell – vocals, guitar
- Rob Trujillo – bass
- Gil Sharone – drums

Production

- Produced by Joe Barresi and Jerry Cantrell
- Recorded and mixed by Joe Barresi
- Mastered by Bob Ludwig with Brian Lee and Bob Jackson
