= Jerry Cantrell =

American rock musician (born 1966)

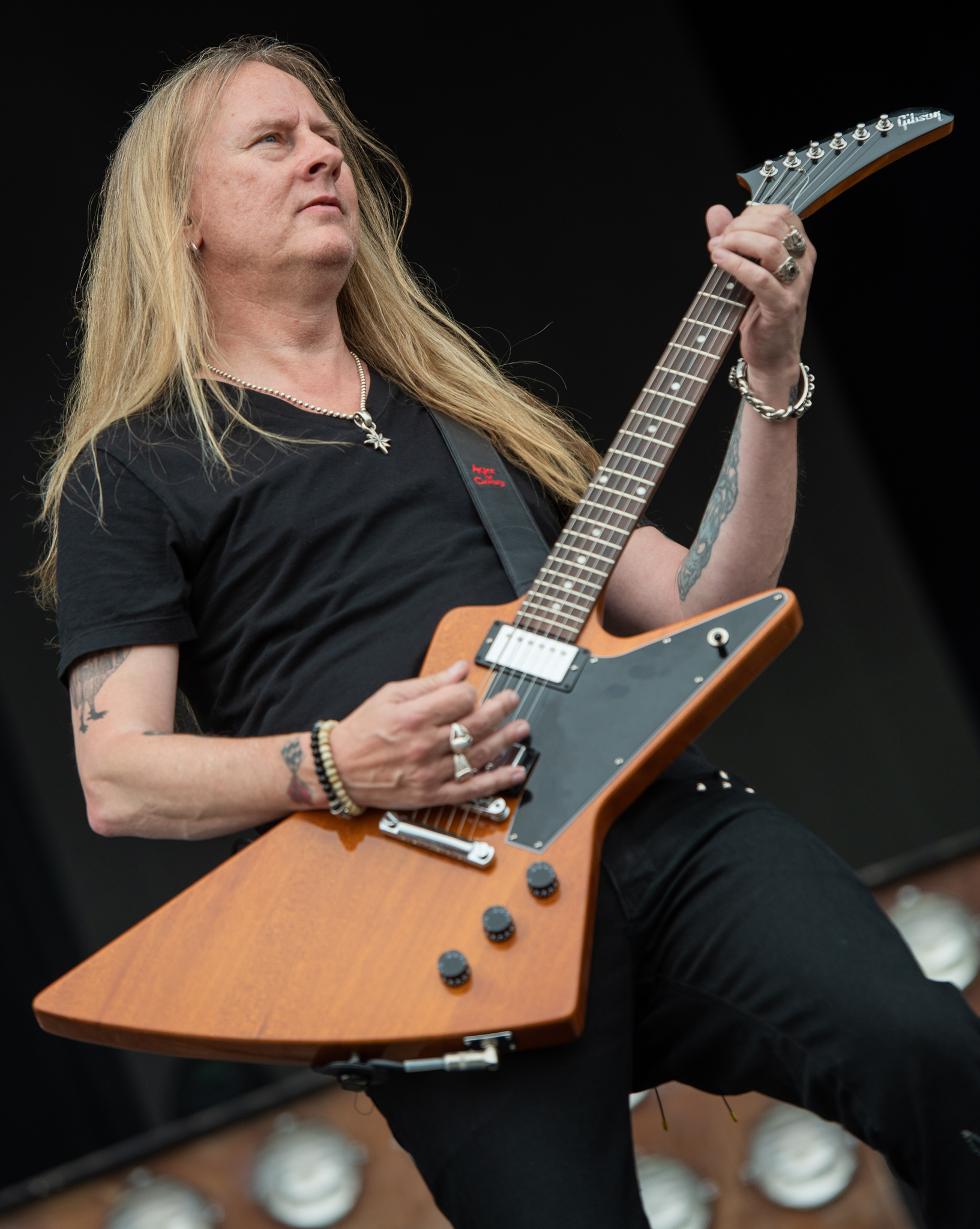
- Cantrell in 2019

Background information
- Born: Jerry Fulton Cantrell Jr. March 18, 1966 (age 60); Tacoma, Washington, U.S.
- Genres: Alternative metal; grunge; heavy metal; doom metal; sludge metal; hard rock
- Occupations: Musician; singer; songwriter
- Instruments: Guitar; vocals
- Years active: 1985–present
- Labels: Columbia; Roadrunner; BMG
- Member of: Alice in Chains
- Formerly of: Diamond Lie; Gypsy Rose; Ozzy Osbourne; Cardboard Vampyres
- Website: jerrycantrell.com

Jerry Fulton Cantrell Jr. (born March 18, 1966) is an American musician who is the founder, lead guitarist, co-lead singer, and main songwriter of the rock band Alice in Chains. The band rose to international fame in the early 1990s during Seattle's grunge movement and is known for its distinctive vocal style which includes the harmonized vocals between Cantrell and Layne Staley.

Cantrell started as a secondary lead singer on Alice in Chains' 1992 EP Sap. After Staley's death in 2002, Cantrell was the band's lead singer on Black Gives Way to Blue (2009), The Devil Put Dinosaurs Here (2013), and Rainier Fog (2018), with new member William DuVall sharing harmonies and primarily singing older songs by Staley in live performances.

He also has a solo career and released the albums Boggy Depot in 1998 and Degradation Trip Volumes 1 & 2 in 2002. His third solo album, Brighten, was released in 2021. His most recent release is 2024's I Want Blood. Cantrell has also collaborated and performed with Heart, Ozzy Osbourne, Metallica, Pantera, Circus of Power, Metal Church, Gov't Mule, Damageplan, Pearl Jam, the Cult, Stone Temple Pilots, Danzig, Glenn Hughes, Duff McKagan, and Deftones, among others.

Cantrell was named "Riff Lord" by British hard rock/metal magazine Metal Hammer in 2006. Guitar World Magazine ranked Cantrell as the 38th out of "100 Greatest Heavy Metal Guitarists of All Time" in 2004, and the 37th "Greatest Guitar Player of All Time" in 2012. Guitar World also ranked Cantrell's solo in "Man in the Box" at No. 77 on its list of "100 Greatest Guitar Solos" in 2008. Cantrell has earned nine Grammy Award nominations as a member of Alice in Chains.

He also contributed to the soundtracks of The Cable Guy (1996), John Wick: Chapter 2 (2017), Dark Nights: Metal (2018) and Sinners (2025), and he has made cameos in films such as Jerry Maguire (1996), Rock Slyde (2009), and Deadwood: The Movie (2019). Cantrell also acted in the Alice in Chains mockumentaries The Nona Tapes (1995) and AIC 23 (2013).

== Biography ==
=== Early life ===
Cantrell was born in Tacoma, Washington, on March 18, 1966, to Gloria Jean Krumpos and Jerry Fulton Cantrell. He grew up in Spanaway, and is the oldest of three children. His father is an Army veteran, and his mother was an amateur organist and melodica player who worked as an administrative assistant for the Clover Park School District in Pierce County, Washington. His maternal grandmother was from Norway, and his maternal grandfather was from the Czech Republic.

After Cantrell learned to write, he documented his goal on Dr. Seuss' book, My Book About Me, filling in the sentence "When I grow up I want to be a..." with the words "rock star".

Cantrell's father, Jerry Sr., is a combat veteran of the Vietnam War. Cantrell's first childhood memory is meeting his father for the first time after he had returned from war when he was three years old. Due to the strain of war, his parents divorced when he was seven years old, and Cantrell was raised by his mother, Gloria, and his maternal grandmother in Tacoma. The family lived on welfare and food stamps. Jerry Sr. was the main subject of the song "Rooster", which Cantrell wrote as a tribute to his father, and his mother Gloria is also mentioned by name in the song. Father and son also appeared together on the music video for "Rooster", in which Jerry Sr. recalls the war. Cantrell would later name his music publishing company as Rooster's Son Publishing.

Cantrell picked up a guitar for the first time when he was in sixth grade. At that time he played clarinet, and his mother was dating a guitar player who handed his guitar to Cantrell and taught him a couple of chords. Cantrell picked it up very quickly, impressing his mother's boyfriend who suggested that she should buy her son a guitar, so she bought him an acoustic guitar. It would not be until the age of 17 that he began seriously playing an electric guitar. Cantrell learned to play guitar by ear, emulating his heroes. In his mid-teens he bought his first guitar from a swap meet, a Korean-made Fender Stratocaster.

Cantrell and his mother moved back to Spanaway where he attended junior high. His first job was delivering newspapers. Cantrell attended high school at Spanaway Lake High School, and, before owning his first guitar, he was a member of the high school choir which attended many state competitions. In his senior year, Cantrell became choir president, and the quartet sang the national anthem at basketball games and won competitions with the highest marks achievable. Cantrell has cited his interest in dark musical tones as dating back to this period: "In choir we performed a cappella Gregorian chants from the 14th and 15th centuries. It was scary church music."

His choir teacher and drama teacher were, early on, his two greatest motivators toward a career in music. When Alice in Chains' first album went gold, Cantrell sent both teachers a gold record. He graduated from high school in 1984.

His maternal grandmother, Dorothy Krumpos, died of cancer in October 1986, and his mother Gloria died of pancreatic cancer at age 43 in April 1987, when Cantrell was 21 years old. Friends recalled that Cantrell fell into depression and became a completely different person after losing both his mother and grandmother within a short span of time.

=== Influences ===
The first album that Cantrell owned was Elton John's 1974 Greatest Hits compilation, which was a gift he received from his father when he was 10 years old. He noted in an interview that he was "raised on country music" as a youth and that he admires the emotion conveyed in the genre. He also considers himself "half Yankee and half redneck". However, hard rock music caught Cantrell's interest predominantly. He would later cite guitarists such as Jimi Hendrix, Ace Frehley, Tony Iommi, Angus Young, Jimmy Page, Glenn Tipton, K.K. Downing, David Gilmour, Nancy Wilson, and Eddie Van Halen as major influences, as well as Elton John and bands Fleetwood Mac, Heart and Rush as his early songwriting idols. Cantrell also cited Soundgarden as a big influence on him.

=== Early career ===
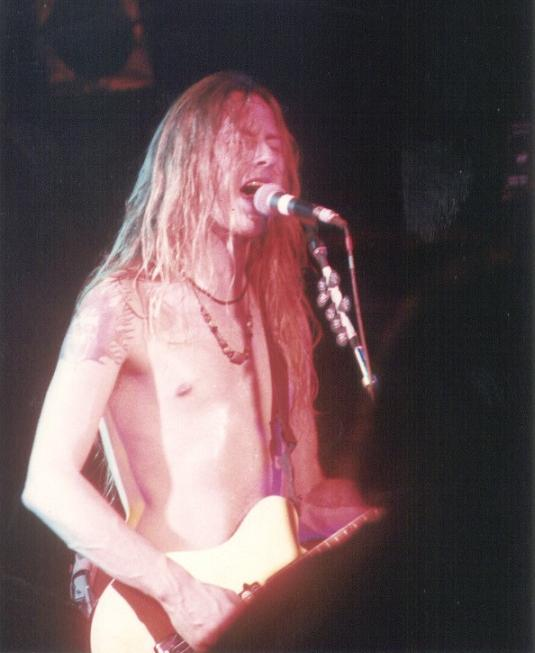
Cantrell playing with Alice in Chains at The Channel in Boston, Massachusetts in 1992

In 1985, Cantrell was attending college during the Winter Semester, but he decided to quit it and moved to Dallas, Texas, to join a band with a couple of friends. Cantrell worked doing asbestos abatement around the Dallas and Houston areas. He also worked at the music store Arnold and Morgan Music Company. While working at the store, Cantrell bought what he described as his first "real guitar", a 1984 G&L Rampage. During that time, he had a band with Vinnie Chas (from Pretty Boy Floyd), called Sinister. Later they formed another band called Raze.

While living in Dallas, Cantrell met an early incarnation of the band Pantera and started a long friendship with brothers Dimebag Darrell and Vinnie Paul.

In 1985 or 1986, Cantrell moved back to Tacoma and began a band called Diamond Lie, which included singer Scott Damon, drummer Bobby Nesbitt and bassist Matt Muasau. The band started playing concerts in Tacoma and Seattle with the goal of getting a record deal. They recorded a four-song demo at London Bridge Studio.

When Cantrell was 20 years old, he was working several part-time jobs to pay his rent, one of which involved throwing boxes of frozen fish in a warehouse. He spent his time outside of work playing guitar and jamming with any band he could find.

Three weeks after his mother's death on April 11, 1987, Cantrell went to see the band Alice N' Chains perform at the Tacoma Little Theatre, and was impressed by the voice of the lead singer, Layne Staley. Diamond Lie played their last concert in July 1987.

Cantrell met Layne Staley, then Alice N' Chains' lead singer, at a party in Seattle around August 1987. He was homeless after being kicked out of his family's house, so Staley invited Cantrell to live with him at the 24-hour rehearsal studio "The Music Bank". Shortly after Cantrell moved in with Staley at the Music Bank, Alice 'N Chains broke up.

Cantrell wanted to form a new band and Staley gave him the phone number of Melinda Starr, the girlfriend of drummer Sean Kinney, so that Cantrell could talk to him. Cantrell called the number and set up a meeting with Kinney. Kinney and his girlfriend went to the Music Bank and listened to Cantrell's demos. Cantrell mentioned that they needed a bass player to jam with them and he had someone in mind: Mike Starr, with whom Cantrell had played in a band in Burien called Gypsy Rose. Kinney pointed at his girlfriend and said: "that's weird cause that's his sister". Kinney called Starr and a few days later they started jamming with Cantrell at the Music Bank, but they didn't have a singer.

Staley was already starting up another band, but Cantrell, Starr and Kinney wanted him to be their lead singer. They started auditioning terrible lead singers in front of Staley to send a hint. The last straw for Staley was when they auditioned a male stripper – he decided to join the band after that. Staley, who was Cantrell's roommate at the time, agreed to join on the condition that Cantrell join his funk project (which ended shortly after), and Staley joined Cantrell's band on a full-time basis. The band had names like "Mothra", "Fuck" and "Diamond Lie", the latter being the name of Cantrell's previous band. Diamond Lie gained attention in the Seattle area and eventually took the name of Staley's previous band, Alice N' Chains, and was quickly renamed as Alice in Chains.

Cantrell attended a Guns N' Roses concert at the Seattle Center in 1988, and took an Alice in Chains demo tape to give to the band. He met Axl Rose after the show and gave him the tape. As he was walking away, Cantrell saw Rose throwing the demo away. Years later, Guns N' Roses chose Alice in Chains to be the opening act of their 2016 reunion tour.

Alice in Chains' final demo, The Treehouse Tapes, was completed in 1988 and found its way to the music managers Kelly Curtis and Susan Silver, who also managed the Seattle bands Mother Love Bone and Soundgarden, respectively. Curtis and Silver passed the demo on to Columbia Records. After three months of negotiations, Alice in Chains signed to Columbia Records on September 11, 1989.

=== Alice in Chains ===
==== Layne Staley era (1987–2002) ====
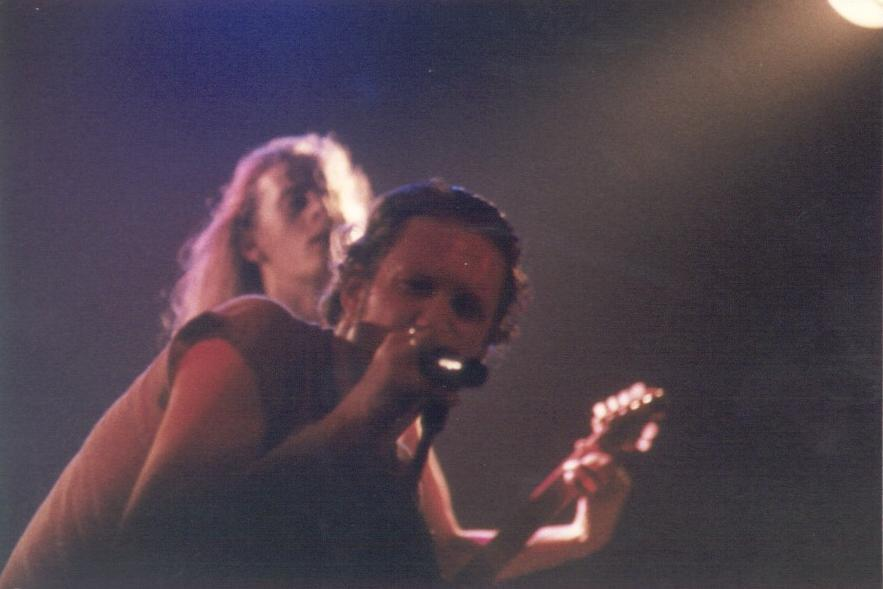
Layne Staley (foreground) and Cantrell performing at The Channel in Boston in 1992

Jerry Cantrell was the lead guitarist, co-lyricist, co-lead singer and main composer of Alice in Chains until the group's near-permanent hiatus beginning in the late 1990s and leading through the death of lead singer Layne Staley in April 2002. Cantrell's guitar contribution gave a heavy metal edge to the band's unique grunge style.

Cantrell started to sing lead vocals on the 1992 acoustic EP Sap, and his role continued to grow in the following albums, making Alice in Chains a two-vocal band. Cantrell stated that it was Staley who encouraged him to sing.

Although Alice in Chains has been labeled grunge by the mainstream media, Cantrell identifies the band as primarily heavy metal. He told Guitar World in 1996, "We're a lot of different things ... I don't quite know what the mixture is, but there's definitely metal, blues, rock and roll, maybe a touch of punk. The metal part will never leave, and I never want it to".

Alice in Chains was one of the most successful bands of the 1990s, selling over 20 million records worldwide, and over 14 million records in the US alone. Their debut album, Facelift, was released in 1990 and has been certified double-platinum by the RIAA, selling over two million copies. Cantrell dedicated the album to his late mother Gloria and to his close friend Andrew Wood, lead singer of the band Mother Love Bone who died in 1990. Speaking with Spin magazine in January 1991, Cantrell confirmed that the song "Sunshine" from Facelift was written about his mother's death. "When I was a little kid, I'd always tell her, "I'll be famous and buy you a house and you'll never have to work again. I'll take care of you like you took care of me.' When she passed away, it was a really shitty time for me. I didn't know how to deal with it then, and I still don't. But it gave me the impetus to do what I'm doing."

In February 1992, the band released the acoustic EP Sap. The EP has been certified gold, and it features guest vocals by Ann Wilson from the band Heart, who joined Cantrell for the chorus of "Brother", and Staley for the chorus of "Am I Inside". The EP also features Mark Arm of Mudhoney and Chris Cornell of Soundgarden, who appeared together on the song "Right Turn", credited as "Alice Mudgarden" in the liner notes. The opening track, "Brother", featured Cantrell on lead vocals. The song was about Cantrell's relationship with his younger brother, David. Cantrell also played bass on the last track, "Love Song".

Their second full-length album, Dirt, was released in September 1992 to critical acclaim and was certified quadruple platinum. The album's lead single, "Would?", was written by Cantrell as a tribute to his late friend Andrew Wood. The song was also featured on the soundtrack to Cameron Crowe's 1992 film Singles. The album's fourth single, "Rooster", was a tribute to Cantrell's father.

Alice in Chains' second acoustic EP, Jar of Flies, debuted at No. 1 on the Billboard 200 chart in 1994, becoming the first ever EP and first Alice in Chains release to top the charts. It has been certified triple platinum by the RIAA. The album's fifth track was an instrumental song, "Whale & Wasp", described by Cantrell as "a conversation between whales and wasps".

Alice in Chains broke up for six months following the cancellation of their opening act at the Metallica tour in July 1994, citing "health problems within the band". The band's self-titled third studio album was released in November 1995, debuted at No. 1 on the Billboard 200 chart, and has been certified double platinum. The singles "Grind", "Over Now", and "Heaven Beside You" feature Cantrell on lead vocals. The band did not tour in support of their self-titled album.

On April 10, 1996, Alice in Chains played their first concert in two and a half years for MTV Unplugged, a program featuring all-acoustic set lists. The show featured some of the band's highest-charting singles, including "Rooster", "Down in a Hole", "Heaven Beside You", "No Excuses" and "Would?", and introduced a new song, "Killer Is Me", with Cantrell on lead vocals. Cantrell stated that he was ill during the performance as a result of food poisoning from a hot dog consumed before the gig.

Alice in Chains performed four shows supporting Kiss on their Alive/Worldwide Tour in 1996, including the final live appearance of Layne Staley on July 3, 1996, in Kansas City, Missouri. Shortly after the show, Staley was found unresponsive after he overdosed on heroin and was hospitalized. Staley rarely left his condo in Seattle, but in 1998 the band reunited to record two new songs, "Get Born Again" and "Died", originally intended for Cantrell's second solo album, the songs were released on the 1999 box set Music Bank. Still in 1999, the band released a 15-track compilation titled Nothing Safe: Best of the Box. Their first compilation, titled "Live", was released on December 5, 2000. In 2001, a second compilation titled Greatest Hits was released.

==== Reunion and new albums (2005–present) ====
Although never officially disbanding, Alice in Chains was plagued by extended inactivity from 1996 onwards due to Staley's substance abuse, which resulted in his death in 2002. The band reformed in 2005 when drummer Sean Kinney had the idea to reunite the surviving members to perform a benefit concert for the victims of the tsunami disaster that struck South Asia in 2004. On February 18, 2005, Cantrell, Mike Inez and Sean Kinney reunited to perform for the first time in 10 years as Alice in Chains at the K-Rock Tsunami Continued Care Relief Concert in Seattle. The band featured Damageplan singer Pat Lachman, as well as other special guests including Maynard James Keenan of Tool, Wes Scantlin from Puddle of Mudd and Ann Wilson of Heart. A few months after that concert, the band called their former manager Susan Silver and Cantrell's manager Bill Siddons and said they wanted to tour as Alice in Chains again.

On March 10, 2006, Cantrell, Inez and Kinney performed at VH1's Decades Rock Live! concert, honoring fellow Seattle musicians Ann and Nancy Wilson of Heart. They played "Would?" with singer Phil Anselmo of Pantera and Down and bass player Duff McKagan of Guns N' Roses and Velvet Revolver, then they played "Rooster" with Ann Wilson and Comes with the Fall singer William DuVall. The band followed the concert with a short United States club tour, several festival dates in Europe, and a brief tour in Japan. To coincide with the band's reunion, Sony Music released the long-delayed third Alice in Chains compilation, The Essential Alice in Chains, a double album that includes 28 songs.

Between 2006 and 2007, Cantrell played in a number of concerts with Alice in Chains featuring guest lead singers such as Ann Wilson, Mark Lanegan, James Hetfield, Phil Anselmo, Billy Corgan, Scott Weiland Sebastian Bach, and William DuVall.

Cantrell explained the band's reunion saying, "We want to celebrate what we did and the memory of our friend. We have played with some [singers] who can actually bring it and add their own thing to it without being a Layne clone. We're not interested in stepping on [Staley's] rich legacy. It's a tough thing to go through. Do you take the Led Zeppelin approach and never play again, because the guy was that important? That's the approach we've taken for a lot of years. Or, do you give it a shot, try something? We're willing to take a chance on it. It's completely a reunion because the three of us who're left are back together. But it's not about separating and forgetting — it's about remembering and moving on."

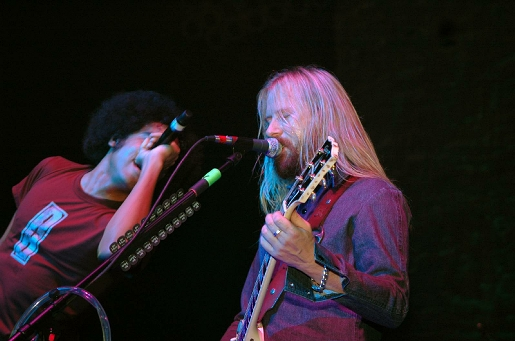
William DuVall and Cantrell performing with Alice in Chains in 2006

Cantrell met singer William DuVall in Los Angeles in 2000, through a mutual acquaintance who introduced him to the first album of DuVall's band, Comes with the Fall. Cantrell started hanging out with the band and occasionally joining them onstage. Comes with the Fall was both the opening act on Cantrell's tour for his second solo album, Degradation Trip, and also the singer's backing band, with DuVall singing Staley's parts at the concerts in 2001 and 2002. DuVall joined Alice in Chains as full-time lead singer during the band's reunion tour in 2006, after making his first public appearance with the band at the VH1 concert.

By April 2007, Alice in Chains had been writing and demoing songs for a new album with DuVall, but the band did not show further signs of progress until October 2008, when they announced that they had begun recording with producer Nick Raskulinecz in the studio. The band didn't have a record label at the time and the album was funded by Cantrell and drummer Sean Kinney. The writing and recording process was completed on March 18, 2009 – Cantrell's 43rd birthday and also the same day that DuVall's son was born.

About the pressure being put on DuVall for replacing Staley as lead singer, Cantrell said, "To put all that weight on Will's shoulders is unfair. We're just figuring out how we work as a team. Although the band has changed, we've lost Layne, we've added Will, and there was no master plan. Playing again in 2005 felt right, so we did the next thing and toured. We did it step by step. It's more than just making music, and it always has been. We've been friends a long time. We've been more of a family than most, and it had to be okay from here", Cantrell said pointing to his heart.

On September 29, 2009, Alice in Chains released their first record since the death of Layne Staley, Black Gives Way to Blue, and toured in support of the album. The album includes songs which Cantrell described as "the heaviest he's ever written", and has Cantrell singing lead vocals on most of the songs and William DuVall as co-lead singer. The title track is a tribute to Layne Staley written and sung by Cantrell, accompanied by Elton John playing piano. In the months before writing the song, Cantrell had been suffering from an unexplained illness. Cantrell believes the mystery illness was the pain of saying goodbye to Staley. He told Guitar World, "I got deathly ill. I had these mystery migraines, intense physical pain, and I'd even gotten a spinal tap to test for certain things. They never could find anything wrong with me. I felt I was puking up all this undigested grief in losing Layne." Once Cantrell started writing the song and the rest of the album, his mystery illness disappeared. Cantrell, Mike Inez and Sean Kinney also thanked Staley in the album's liner notes. The album was certified Gold by the RIAA in May 2010, selling over 500,000 copies in the U.S.

The band released their fifth studio album, The Devil Put Dinosaurs Here, on May 28, 2013, and Cantrell continued his role of main singer in the album. The album debuted at No. 2 on the Billboard 200 (the band's highest chart position since 1995's Alice in Chains, which debuted at No. 1), selling 61,000 copies in its first week of release.

In June 2017, Alice in Chains returned to Seattle's Studio X to record their sixth studio album. Studio X was the same studio where the band recorded their self-titled album, Alice in Chains (1995), Recording was completed in January 2018. On June 27, 2018, the band announced the title and unveiled the cover art of the new album, Rainier Fog, released on August 24, 2018, through BMG, Alice in Chains' first release on the label. Cantrell took the album's title from the Mount Rainier in Seattle, and the title track is a tribute to the Seattle music scene.

As part of the promotion of Rainier Fog, the baseball team Seattle Mariners hosted an "Alice in Chains Night" at the Safeco Field in Seattle on August 20, 2018, and Cantrell threw out the ceremonial first pitch and delivered a strike before the Mariners vs. Houston Astros game.

As of 2018, Alice in Chains has had 18 Top 10 songs on the Mainstream Rock Tracks chart, 5 No. 1 hits, and eleven Grammy Award nominations.

=== Solo career: Boggy Depot, Degradation Trip, Brighten and I Want Blood (1996–present) ===
Cantrell's career outside Alice in Chains has consisted of four solo albums, as well as many appearances with other musicians and on film soundtracks. His first solo material was the song "Leave Me Alone", released exclusively on The Cable Guy soundtrack in 1996, featuring Alice in Chains drummer Sean Kinney on drums and Cantrell on lead vocals, guitar and bass. It had a music video, which was included as a bonus feature on the 15th anniversary edition Blu-Ray of The Cable Guy in 2011, and the song reached No. 14 on Billboard's Mainstream Rock Tracks. In the same year, Cantrell covered Willie Nelson's "I've Seen All This World I Care to See" for the album Twisted Willie: A Tribute to Willie Nelson. As the activity of Alice in Chains slowed and the band's future came into question, Cantrell reluctantly began work on his first full-length solo record. While video footage from Cantrell's official website claimed that he wanted to work solo for some time, his comments in Guitar World stated otherwise:

It's something I never really wanted to do, but the way things have played out, it's like, why not? To be honest, I'd just be happy being the lead guitarist and singer for Alice In Chains. It's always been my first love, and always will be, but the situation being what it is... we've been together for a long time, and right now it's kinda played out. It's time to let it be. Now I've got to step up to the plate and take a few swings.

Cantrell's debut solo album, Boggy Depot, was released on April 7, 1998, and published by Cantrell's Boggy Bottom Publishing company. The title comes from the ghost town of the same name in Oklahoma, which is the area that Cantrell's father grew up in. The album cover shows Cantrell covered in mud standing waist-deep in a branch of the Boggy River. Besides singing, Cantrell also played guitar, piano, clavinet, organ, and steel drums on the album. The tracks "Cut You In", "My Song" and "Dickeye" were released as singles to promote the album. Cantrell's father played the sheriff in the music video for "Cut You In".

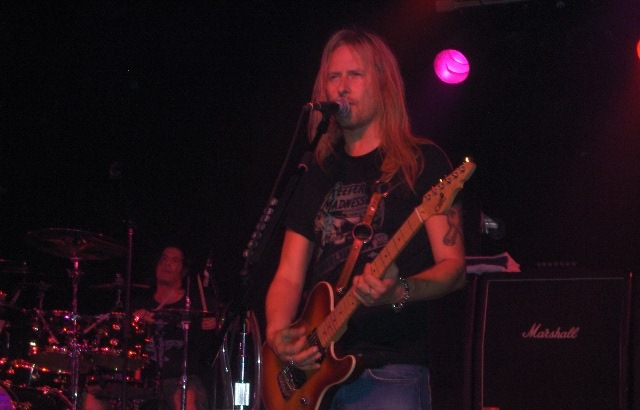
Cantrell in 2006

Cantrell opened for Metallica and Van Halen on their 1998 summer tour. The same year of Boggy Depot, Cantrell began writing a follow-up album. He also departed from Columbia Records during this time and had trouble finding a new label. Cantrell said of the writing experience:

In '98, I locked myself in my house, went out of my mind and wrote 25 songs. I rarely bathed during that period of writing; I sent out for food, I didn't really venture out of my house in three or four months. It was a hell of an experience. The album is an overview of birth to now.

In 1998, Layne Staley almost performed live again since Alice in Chains' last concert in July 1996, when Cantrell went to Seattle on his solo tour for Boggy Depot. It was Halloween night and Staley was backstage as a guest. Cantrell reportedly asked Staley to join him onstage, but Staley declined.

Cantrell started recording a follow-up to Boggy Depot in 2000. He was also living in San Francisco during that period. He had to sell his Seattle house to fund the album and produced it himself. Finally in June 2002, Cantrell issued his second solo album, Degradation Trip, with Ozzy Osbourne's then live rhythm section, Mike Bordin (drums) and Robert Trujillo (bass). Released on Roadrunner Records, Degradation Trip hit shelves two months after Layne Staley's death and was dedicated to him. The songs on the album ranged from doom metal to pop-based hard rock. The album, which received better critical reception than its predecessor, featured two singles, "Anger Rising" and "Angel Eyes", and the track "She Was My Girl" was included on the Spider-Man soundtrack.

Degradation Trip has sold 100,000 copies in the U.S. as of December 2002. The live show was well received by audiences on a national tour that helped build upon the solo album's success. Degradation Trip was re-released in November 2002 as a double album, featuring eleven additional tracks that were made for the album as Cantrell originally intended. In the Spring of 2004, Cantrell opened a slate of shows on Kid Rock's U.S. tour.

Cantrell has been rumored to be working on his third full-length solo album for several years, for a supposedly planned release in 2006. However, this album was not released until 2021. Subsequent work with the revamped Alice in Chains may have stalled this release. When asked about releasing another solo album, he issued this statement in 2010:

Not for a while. My first and foremost love has been this band and always has been. The only reason I did those two records is because we weren't working as a band. But being a part of this band is a full time job. Some guys can do multiple things and maybe when I was younger I could do that, but not now.

In November 2014, during an interview on radio 95.5 KLOS, Cantrell was asked if he had any plans on doing more solo work, to which he replied: "I don't know. Maybe somewhere down the road. The only reason I ever did anything by my own was because my band wasn't really doing anything. My band has been doing things lately, so I don't really have time to do anything. I kinda focus my energy there [in the band]. Of course, you know, possibilities..." Cantrell expressed the same sentiment when asked about a new solo album during an interview with Trunk Nation in August 2017, stating that Alice in Chains has always been his number one concern, but that he would not rule out a new solo album in the future.

In February 2017, Cantrell released his first solo song in 15 years, "A Job to Do", featured during the end credits of the movie John Wick: Chapter 2. On February 6, 2019, Cantrell performed a two-song acoustic set for BMG's Pre-Grammy Party at the No Name bar in Los Angeles.

On December 6 and 7, 2019, Cantrell performed two sold-out solo concerts at the Pico Union Project in Los Angeles. His first solo concerts since 2004. Cantrell performed his solo material along with Alice in Chains' songs and covers of other artists such as Elton John and Creedence Clearwater Revival. He was joined by Greg Puciato and Terra Lopez on vocals, Tyler Bates on guitar, Johnny Scaglione on acoustic guitar, James Lomenzo on bass, Gil Sharone on drums, Jordan Lewis on keyboards and Michael Rozon on pedal steel guitar.

On January 24, 2020, Cantrell announced that he was working on a new solo album. He started recording at Dave's Room Recording Studio in North Hollywood, California on March 10, 2020. On March 4, 2021, he announced via his Instagram page that he had completed the album, captioning the photo "Finished my record tonight one year to the day from when we started recording it. What a crazy journey ... always is. Look forward to setting it free upon your ear holes sometime soon." On July 28, 2021, Cantrell posted a teaser trailer in his social media announcing that a new song and video titled "Atone" would be released on July 29. Cantrell's third solo album is titled Brighten and was released on October 29, 2021. Cantrell announced a new song, "Vilified", to be released on July 25, 2024. Cantrell released his fourth solo album titled I Want Blood on October 18, 2024.

== Collaborations ==
=== Recordings ===
Cantrell has appeared as guest guitarist on several albums and projects, including the Danzig album Blackacidevil (1996), in which he played on three tracks ("See All You Were", "Come to Silver" and "Hand of Doom"), and the Metallica album Garage Inc. (1998) on the band's rendition of Lynyrd Skynyrd's "Tuesday's Gone". He also guested on Circus of Power's 1993 album Magic & Madness for the song "Heaven & Hell", played lead guitar on Metal Church's "Gods of a Second Chance" from their 1993 album Hanging in the Balance, and played on the track "Marry Me" from Pigeonhed's 1997 album, The Full Sentence.

Cantrell provided background vocals for the track "Effigy" on Gov't Mule's 2001 album, The Deep End, Volume 1.

In a May 2001 interview with Metal-is.com, Cantrell revealed that he had written four songs for Ozzy Osbourne. Cantrell, Osbourne, guitarist Zakk Wylde, bassist Robert Trujillo and drummer Mike Bordin went to the studio and made some rough demos of those songs.

Cantrell played guitar in the song "Fallen Ones" from Heart's 2004 album Jupiters Darling.

Cantrell was the lead guitarist in all of the tracks from Ozzy Osbourne's 2005 album of cover songs, Under Cover. The songs performed by Cantrell were also included on disc four of Osbourne's box set Prince of Darkness (2005).

In 2007, Cantrell played guitar on Glenn Hughes's rendition of Led Zeppelin's "Misty Mountain Hop", featured on Hughes' solo album Music for the Divine, and played on the track "Soul Ecstacy" off the Stevie Salas's album The Sun and the Earth: The Essential Stevie Salas, Vol. 1. He also played guitar on Smith & Pyle's debut album, It's OK To Be Happy, released in 2008.

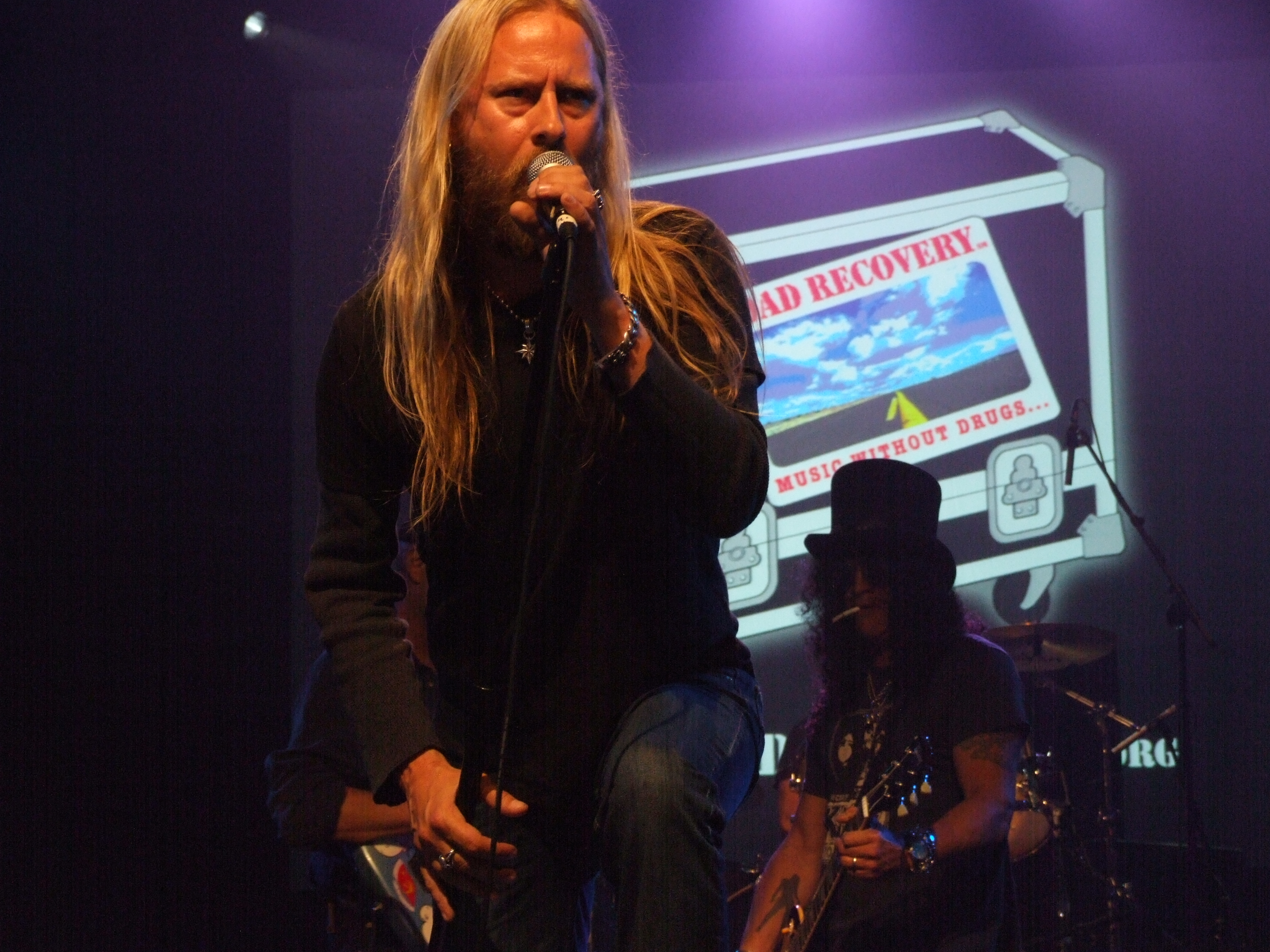
Cantrell performing with Slash (background) in 2008

In 2010, Cantrell played guitar on the song "Anything" from Pearl Aday's debut album, Little Immaculate White Fox. Aday stated that she thought Cantrell would be a good person to put in some "heartbroken, haunting, crying guitar" on the track.

Cantrell sings background vocals and does a lead vocal ad-lib in the final chorus of "Love Is Blind" from Richie Kotzen's 2011 album, 24 Hours.

He played guitar on Duff McKagan's 2015 EP How to Be a Man, and has also collaborated with Alternative Metal band Deftones, contributing guitar parts to the track "Phantom Bride" off their 2016 album Gore.

=== Live performances ===
Cantrell performed a snippet of "Man in the Box" followed by a cover of Motörhead's "Ace of Spades" alongside Pantera during their concert at the Seattle Center Coliseum on March 1, 1992. Cantrell joined the band again for their performance of "Walk" during a concert in San Jose, California on February 6, 2001. On October 9, 1994, Cantrell joined Metallica for a performance of "For Whom the Bell Tolls" during their concert in Oklahoma City.

In 2002, Cantrell played a series of summer dates with headlining rock band Nickelback. Cantrell can be seen playing Alice in Chains' "It Ain't Like That" with the band on their first DVD release, Live at Home (2002). He was also asked by Nickelback's frontman, Chad Kroeger, to contribute to the song "Hero" for the 2002 film Spider-Man. Cantrell was unable to attend the recording session and was replaced by Saliva's Josey Scott.

Cantrell made several guest appearances with the supergroup Camp Freddy, (a covers band featuring Jane's Addiction guitarist Dave Navarro, former Guns N' Roses drummer Matt Sorum, Red Hot Chili Peppers drummer Chad Smith and Billy Idol guitarist Billy Morrison), performing with them for the first time at The Sundance Film Festival on January 19, 2004.

The experience with Camp Freddy inspired Cantrell and The Cult guitarist Billy Duffy to form their own covers band, the rock supergroup Cardboard Vampyres (named after Cantrell's cats). Under the moniker of the Jerry Cantrell-Billy Duffy Band, they debuted during the three-concert series for Sweet Relief Musicians Fund at The Troubadour in April 2004. "This band is really just about having fun and playing tunes that we were fans of growing up," Cantrell stated. Performing mostly cover songs from bands like Led Zeppelin, AC/DC, The Stooges, Black Sabbath, and Aerosmith, the group was rounded out by singer John Corabi, bassist Chris Wyse, and drummer Josh Howser. The band played at various venues in the United States; although, they predominately played along the West Coast. No formal albums were released by the band.

Cantrell joined Metallica on backing vocals during their performance of "Nothing Else Matters" at the Download Festival in Dublin on June 11, 2006.

On October 6, 2009, Cantrell joined Pearl Jam during their concert at the Gibson Amphitheater in Los Angeles. Cantrell hopped on stage to close out the night with the guitar solo on "Alive". The following night, Cantrell joined the band to perform "Kick Out the Jams".

Cantrell made a special appearance at a Stone Temple Pilots concert in Camden, New Jersey, on May 23, 2010, playing guitar during the band's performance of "Sex Type Thing".

On December 9, 2011, Cantrell joined Metallica for their 30th anniversary concert at The Fillmore in San Francisco and performed the songs "For Whom the Bell Tolls", "Nothing Else Matters", "Seek and Destroy" and a cover of Lynyrd Skynyrd's "Tuesday's Gone".

On May 12, 2012, Cantrell made a duet with Somar Macek accompanied by the Synergia Northwest Orchestra for a performance of Elton John's "Levon" at the Paramount Theater in Seattle, during a benefit concert for music education in Northwest public schools.

Cantrell performed with Duff McKagan's band The Walking Papers during the band's concert at The Crocodile in Seattle on December 15, 2012.

On April 18, 2013, the Seattle band Heart was inducted into the Rock and Roll Hall of Fame, and Cantrell joined the band onstage for a performance of "Crazy On You". Cantrell alongside Pearl Jam's Mike McCready and Soundgarden's Chris Cornell, also played guitar for Heart's hit song "Barracuda" with Ann and Nancy Wilson at the ceremony.

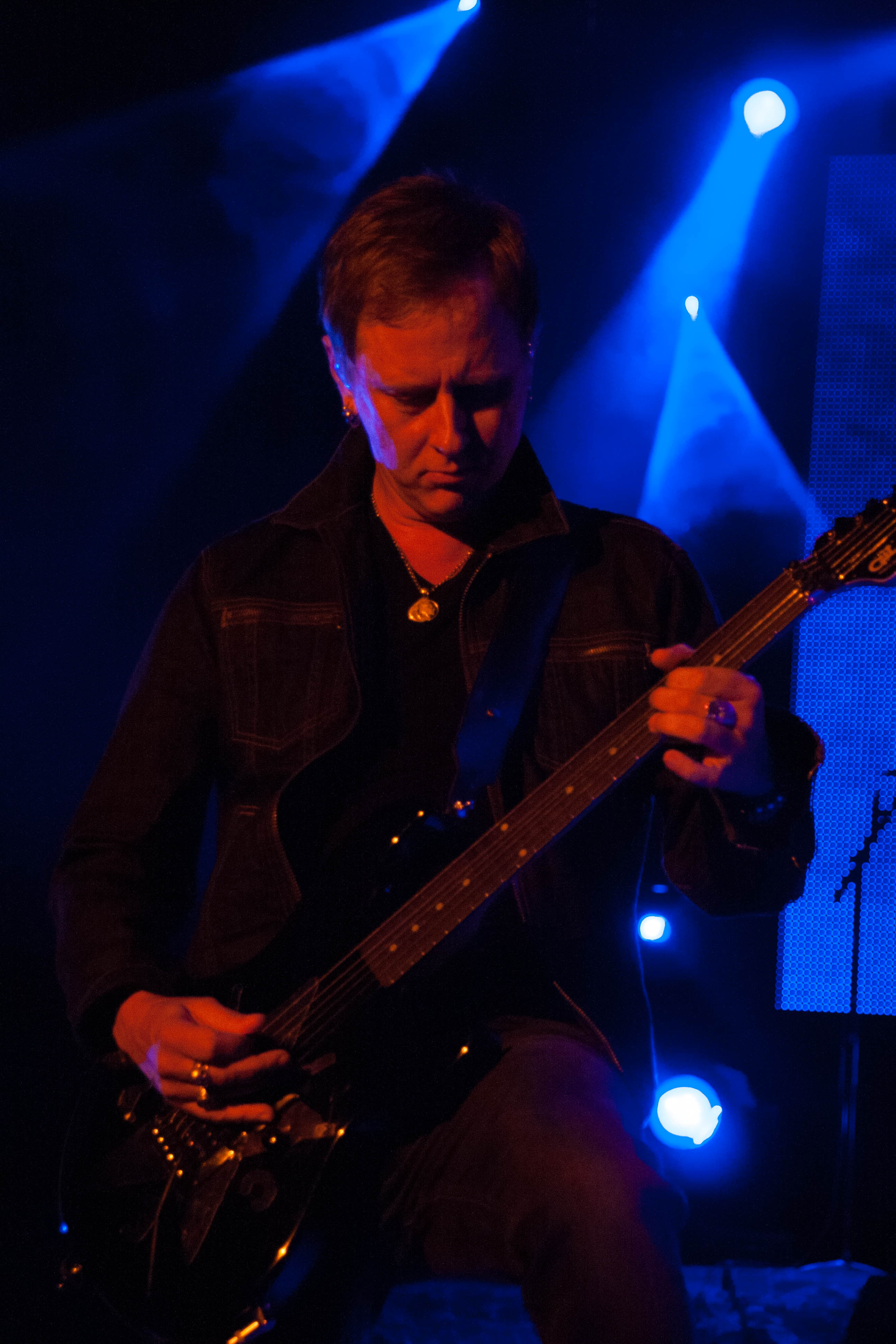
Cantrell in 2013

On November 20, 2015, Cantrell joined The Cult on stage at the Hollywood Palladium in Los Angeles to perform the song "The Phoenix". On December 16, 2015, Cantrell joined the supergroup Royal Machines at The Roxy Theatre in West Hollywood and performed Thin Lizzy's "Jailbreak" and Alice in Chains' "Would?" and "Man in the Box".

On March 13, 2017, Cantrell made a guest appearance at Steel Panther's concert at The Roxy Theatre in West Hollywood and performed "Man In The Box" with the band joined by Godsmack singer Sully Erna on lead vocals. On March 25, 2017, Cantrell performed with Nancy Wilson and Mike Inez at the 5th annual Rock Against MS benefit concert.

Cantrell was one of the musicians who participated on the Founders Award Celebration honoring The Doors at Seattle's Museum of Pop Culture on December 7, 2017. Cantrell sang "Love Her Madly" accompanied by The Doors' original guitarist Robby Krieger, keyboardist George Laks, bassist Zander Schloss, and drummer Brian Young. He came back at the end of the concert to sing "Roadhouse Blues" together with all the artists who performed at the tribute.

On December 8, 2017, Cantrell joined The Hellcat Saints (a supergroup featuring members of The Cult, Velvet Revolver, Weezer and Apocalyptica), to open for Jane's Addiction at the third annual Rhonda's Kiss benefit concert at the Hollywood Palladium in Los Angeles. Proceeds from the concert benefited the Cedars-Sinai Samuel Oschin Comprehensive Cancer Institute and further the mission of Rhonda's Kiss, an organization that helps cancer patients in need. Cantrell performed Alice in Chains' hits "Would?" and "Man in the Box", and sang Thin Lizzy's "Jailbreak".

On January 16, 2019, Cantrell along with William DuVall, Pearl Jam's guitarist Stone Gossard and bassist Jeff Ament, and drummer Josh Freese performed Soundgarden's "Hunted Down" at the Chris Cornell tribute concert "I Am the Highway".

On November 8, 2025, joined Kim Thayil, Hiro Yamamoto, Matt Cameron, Ben Shepherd, Brandi Carlile, Mike McCready, and Taylor Momsen for Soundgarden's induction into the Rock and Roll Hall of Fame.

== Soundtrack contributions ==
Cantrell's song "Leave Me Alone" was featured in the 1996 dark comedy The Cable Guy and can be found on that movie's soundtrack. "She Was My Girl" from Degradation Trip was included on the Spider-Man (2002) soundtrack.

Cantrell returned to the movie scene in 2004 to write, with the newly formed metal band Damageplan, the song "Ashes to Ashes" for the movie The Punisher. The song features Cantrell sharing lead vocals with Damageplan singer Patrick Lachman, and it can be found on that movie's soundtrack, and as a bonus track on the Japanese version of Damageplan's debut album, New Found Power.

In February 2017, Cantrell released the song "A Job to Do", the end-title song to John Wick: Chapter 2. Cantrell wrote the lyrics from the perspective of Keanu Reeves' title character. Cantrell said in a statement: "I really dug John Wick and have always admired Keanu's work. When the opportunity arose to create a song for the second film, Tyler Bates and I wrote and recorded 'A Job To Do', a theme song for the character. Can't wait to see it!".

On July 19, 2018, Cantrell released the song "Setting Sun" for the soundtrack of DC Comics' graphic novel Dark Nights: Metal. The song was released as a single in digital platforms.

== Style ==
Cantrell's early influences made Alice in Chains' heavy metal tones stand out among their fellow grunge/alternative rock-oriented bands of the Seattle music scene. However, his musical range also extends into elements of blues and country as heard on his solo debut album. Cantrell's guitar playing is known for its unique use of wah pedal as well as odd time signatures. In a 1998 interview with Guitar World, he was asked about the latter quality:

I really don't know where that comes from; it just comes naturally to me. I could sit down and figure it out, but what's the use? Off-time stuff is just more exciting – it takes people by surprise when you shift gears like that before they even know what the hell hit 'em. It's also effective when you slow something down and then slam 'em into the dash. A lot of Alice stuff is written that way – "Them Bones" is a great off-time song.

== Equipment ==
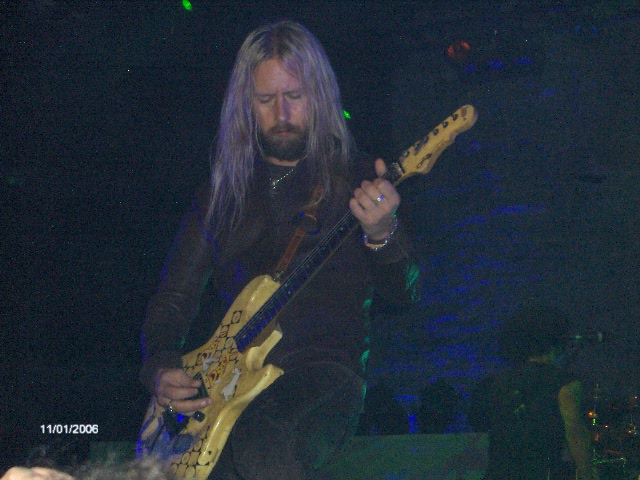
Cantrell with the original "Blue Dress" G&L guitar during an Alice in Chains concert in 2006.

Cantrell's best-known guitar is a G&L Rampage model, the 'Blue Dress' guitar, so-called because it features a sticker of a pin-up girl wearing a blue dress. Cantrell's original G&L models feature a maple body, maple neck and ebony fingerboard. The bridge is a Kahler tremolo, as opposed to the Floyd Rose tremolo more commonly seen on instruments made throughout the 1980s and 90s. The guitars feature a single bridge humbucker and volume control.

As a result of his long-time patronage, G&L have released two different Jerry Cantrell signature guitars. The first is a Rampage model, based on Cantrell's original number-one guitar. The second, the Superhawk, features a fixed bridge and an additional neck pickup.

Cantrell used the original "Blue Dress" guitar on the music videos for "Man in the Box", "We Die Young", "Sea of Sorrow", "Grind", and "Again". The guitar can also be seen in the movie Singles. In 2011, Cantrell revealed that he had to retire the guitar due to a hairline crack from the neck all the way through the back of the body. Before that, he had never gone on tour without it.

Aside from his main G&L models, Cantrell is known to use a selection of Gibson Les Paul models, most notably an Alpine White-finished Les Paul Custom with numerous torch burn marks in the finish. Cantrell has used this guitar on every Alice in Chains album, along with the original 'Blue Dress' G&L. In 2022, Epiphone released a signature Les Paul Custom for Cantrell, named 'Wino' due to its dark Wine Red finish.

On other occasions, he has been seen with a Fender Telecaster, a Gibson SG and Explorer, an Ernie Ball Music Man EVH (a gift from Eddie Van Halen in the 1990s before its theft in 2001) a Mosrite Ventures model, a Dean Michael Schenker USA V, and Dean Soltero guitars. The Ernie Ball Music Man EVH signature model, stolen in 2001, was eventually returned to Cantrell and was used live in 2018.

Cantrell has used a variety of amplifiers made by Bogner, Mesa Boogie and Marshall throughout his career. Most recently, he has been using a signature amp, the JJ100, made for him by Friedman Amplification.

In 2010, Jim Dunlop introduced the "JC95 Cantrell Signature Cry Baby", Cantrell's signature Cry Baby wah pedal, based on the original Jimi Hendrix Wah pedal that Cantrell used since his early days. The lyrics to "Black Gives Way to Blue" are printed on the base plate of the pedal. In 2013, a limited edition of the pedal was released in black and red featuring the cover artwork for the album The Devil Put Dinosaurs Here, and the lyrics to "Stone" on the bottom. In January 2019, Dunlop released a new version of the pedal, with a design based on Cantrell's tribal orca tattoo created by Coast Salish artist Joe Wilson, and lyrics for the Alice in Chains song "Rainier Fog" on the bottom plate.

=== Guitars ===
- 1984 G&L "No War" Rampage
- 1985 G&L "Blue Dress" Rampage
- Gibson Les Paul Custom
- Gibson Custom Shop Jerry Cantrell SG
- G&L Jerry Cantrell signature Rampage prototype
- Gibson Flying V 2018 Aged Cherry
- Gibson Explorer
- Ernie Ball Music Man EVH Model - Given to Jerry by Eddie

=== Amps ===
- Bogner Shiva
- Bogner Fish preamp
- 2 Friedman Amplification BE100 Brown Eye heads
- Friedman JJ-100 Jerry Cantrell Signature 100W Hand Wired Tube Guitar Head

=== Effects ===
- Dunlop Jerry Cantrell signature Cry Baby wah
- MXR EVH117 Flanger
- MXR Bass Octave Deluxe
- MXR Smart Gate
- Xotic Effects AC Plus
- Eventide TimeFactor
- Boss CH-1 Super Chorus
- Boss CE-3 Chorus
- Ibanez TS808HW Tube Screamer

== Legacy ==
Cantrell is widely regarded as one of the greatest rock guitarists of his generation. Pantera and Damageplan guitarist Dimebag Darrell expressed his admiration for Cantrell's guitar work in an interview for Guitar International in 1995, saying that "the layering and the honest feel that Jerry Cantrell gets on [Alice in Chains' Dirt] record is worth a lot more than someone who plays five million notes".

In July 2006, British hard rock/metal magazine Metal Hammer awarded Cantrell the title of "Riff Lord" at its annual Metal Hammer Golden Gods Awards show, held at the London Astoria. He was apparently thrilled at winning the title over several famous artists such as Slash, James Hetfield, and Jimmy Page.

He was ranked 38th out of 100 Greatest Heavy Metal Guitarists of All Time by Guitar World in 2004, and ranked at No. 37 out of "100 Greatest Guitarists of All Time" also by Guitar World in 2012.

In October 2008, Guitar World ranked Cantrell's solo in "Man in the Box" at No. 77 on its list of "100 Greatest Guitar Solos". Cantrell was ranked at No. 98 on the list of the "Top 100 Most Complete Guitar Players of All Time" by Envision Radio Networks' "Chop Shop" guitar show in December 2008.

Elton John stated in a 2009 interview with Rolling Stone that he's been an admirer of Cantrell for quite some time, and couldn't resist the offer to play on Alice in Chains' song "Black Gives Way to Blue" at Cantrell's request.

Guns N' Roses guitarist Slash stated in a 2010 interview with Epiphone.com that Cantrell is one of the most inspiring lead guitar players that have come out in the last 20 years.

In a 2015 interview with Loudwire discussing five of his essential guitar albums, Slayer guitarist Kerry King said about Cantrell:

Cantrell did the harmonies with Layne, and they were haunting, especially on Dirt. Those two guys really had their thing figured out. Guitar-wise, Jerry's playing was always exciting and interesting. "Them Bones" is a heavy f---ing song. Jerry's tone on that one is insane. The title track has a really ominous intro that sets the mood for the rest of the song. So many great guitar riffs and solo performances on this record. Jerry's a really solid blues-rock guitarist, very tasteful and emotive.

In 2016, Blend Guitar ranked Cantrell at No. 7 on its list of "Top 10 Underrated Guitarists", and Loudwire ranked him at No. 38 on its list of "The 66 Best Hard Rock + Metal Guitarists of All Time".

In 2018, Cantrell was named "Guitarist of the Year" by Ultimate Guitar's readers poll. Cantrell and William DuVall were also tied at No. 10 on Total Guitar/MusicRadar's "15 best rock guitarists in the world right now" poll.

== Other ventures ==
Between 2009 and 2010, Cantrell co-owned a hard rock bar called Dead Man's Hand in Las Vegas with Anthrax guitarist Scott Ian.

In 2011, Cantrell appeared on a spot for NADCP, the National Association of Drug Court Professionals.

In 2012, Cantrell's voice was featured on a smoking policy ad at the Sea-Tac Airport in Seattle.

He appeared at E3 2014 to demonstrate the Ubisoft music video game Rocksmith 2014.

On May 18, 2019, it was announced that Cantrell will compose the score for Shane Dax Taylor's upcoming sci-fi film, Salvage.

On January 17, 2020, Cantrell officially joined Gibson as a brand ambassador.

=== Acting ===
In his teens, Cantrell was acting in lead roles in high school plays. In a 1998 Q&A, Cantrell revealed that acting has always been an interest to him.

Cantrell is featured in the 1992 movie Singles, along with the rest of Alice in Chains performing the songs "It Ain't Like That" and "Would?".

In the early 1990s, Cantrell and his Alice in Chains bandmates Layne Staley and Mike Starr were featured on the music video "Never a Know, But the No", from the Seattle thrash metal band Forced Entry.

In 1995, Cantrell played journalist Nona Weisbaum on the Alice in Chains mockumentary The Nona Tapes.

In 1996, he had a cameo in Cameron Crowe's Jerry Maguire playing "Jesus of CopyMat", the CopyMat worker who helped Tom Cruise's character make copies of his manifesto. Cantrell said about the film; "I get more people coming up to me telling me my line. It was such a big movie and it was really fun to do." Cantrell was also Crowe's first choice for the role of Stillwater bass player Larry Fellows in Almost Famous (2000), but he was busy writing the songs for his solo album Degradation Trip and had to turn the role down. Mark Kozelek was cast instead.

He also had a cameo as himself in the 2009 film noir comedy Rock Slyde, appeared on the background of two scenes from the first episode of season three of the HBO TV series Deadwood in 2006, and made a cameo in Deadwood: The Movie in 2019.

In 2013, Cantrell played country singer Donnie "Skeeter" Dollarhide Jr. on the Alice in Chains mockumentary AIC 23.

In 2018, Cantrell played Terry, a plumber who plays bass in a garage band in the short film Dad Band, co-starring W. Earl Brown. Cantrell also composed the film score along with Carl Restivo.

== Personal life ==
Cantrell was homeless in the early 1990s and lived for some time at the house of Pearl Jam's manager Kelly Curtis. While living in the basement of Curtis' house, Cantrell was roommates with Pearl Jam lead singer Eddie Vedder. At the start of 1991, Cantrell moved in with Soundgarden lead singer Chris Cornell and his then-wife Susan Silver at their house in Seattle. Silver was also Alice in Chains' manager. Cantrell wrote the song "Rooster" at the Cornells' house and stayed there for a few weeks. Cantrell would later pay tribute to Cornell during the Rock and Roll Hall of Fame ceremony on April 14, 2018, joining singer Ann Wilson for a rendition of Soundgarden's "Black Hole Sun". Alice in Chains also paid tribute to Cornell on the one-year anniversary of his death on May 18, 2018. The band covered two Soundgarden songs, "Hunted Down" and "Boot Camp", closing their headlining set at the Rock on the Range festival in Columbus, Ohio. Towards the end of "Boot Camp", the lights on stage spelled out "CC" for Chris Cornell and "SG" for Soundgarden as feedback rang out.

Cantrell lived in Monroe, Washington, from the mid-1990s until the early 2000s. He has lived in Studio City, California, since 2003, and he has maintained a residence in Burien, Washington, since 2012.

=== Friendship with Layne Staley ===
Cantrell was a close friend of late Alice in Chains' lead singer Layne Staley, who was described by Cantrell as his best friend. Staley died on April 5, 2002, at the same time of Cantrell's Degradation Trip tour, but Cantrell opted not to cancel any shows, stating, "It's difficult to do interviews - it's hard to talk about it [Staley's death]. I'm just thankful to have a tour and work - something I can focus on." "The shows I played between the time I got the word about Layne and Layne's funeral were very important to me in terms of being able to continue on. It's one of those things where if you take a break and allow things to settle in, it might be harder to get up again." Cantrell's manager at the time, Bill Siddons, said that Jerry really loved Layne and they had a bond he hadn't seen before. Asked about Staley's death in an interview with MTV in July 2002, Cantrell said: "It's something I'm still dealing with, and I still think like he's here. I miss him tremendously. I love him and have to move on. I'll remember him and respect the memories of what we did together and just enjoy life... and that's all I'll say about it." William DuVall, who performed Staley's vocals during Cantrell's solo concerts, elaborated on this emotional period saying: "I lost my grandfather in the same week, so Cantrell and I both hit the road with immense personal losses dogging us. There were times on stage—there was one show in Charlotte where it was just so heavy. I'm holding back tears onstage, and Jerry would start crying onstage too a lot at that point, and a lot of times we would just look at each other when we were singing the stuff because it was the only way... it was heavy. I can't quantify it really in words."

Cantrell canceled the show that he was scheduled to perform at 98 Rock's Livestock Festival in Zephyrhills on April 28 in order to attend Staley's funeral in Seattle in the same day. Cantrell dedicated his solo album, Degradation Trip, released two months after Staley's death, to his memory. He also adopted Staley's cat, a female Siamese named Sadie, after his death. The cat appeared on Cantrell's episode of MTV Cribs, which was shot at his ranch in Oklahoma in September 2002. Sadie died on the same night of Alice in Chains' concert in Seattle on October 8, 2010, aged 18.

=== Religious views ===
Cantrell is critical of religion and Young Earth creationism, satirizing them both in Alice in Chains' 2013 album, The Devil Put Dinosaurs Here. Cantrell stated, "There are two things you never want to get into a conversation or argument about: politics and religion. But fuck, I guess we're going to be talking about this for awhile." "No one in the band claims to be an expert on religion, but the title of the song [The Devil Put Dinosaurs Here] comes from something that a lot of people actually believe in." Cantrell also stated that he's sick of the hypocrisy that's taken over many facets of organized religion. "I think there's overwhelming evidence that things aren't working right now. We need to start growing up as a people. When you're teaching people that being gay is a mortal sin, yet a good portion of the people teaching this are fucking kids, there's a huge problem."

=== Surgeries ===
During his independent tour for Degradation Trip before the album was released, Cantrell broke his left hand while playing football after a concert at the Kentucky Derby on May 3, 2001. He needed reconstructive surgery but while he waited for that, in pain, he played his first concert as a frontman without a guitar opening for Cheap Trick in Atlanta. Cantrell needed a titanium plate and four screws to put the bones back together; he said breaking his hand was the worst physical pain he ever had. The injury caused the remainder of Cantrell's solo tour to be postponed, until July 2001.

Cantrell underwent shoulder surgery twice. In December 2005, a surgery in his left shoulder removed bone fragments and repaired cartilage. During a chat at ESPN.com on November 29, 2011, Cantrell revealed that he had gone through another surgery earlier that year, this time in his right shoulder and that he was in the tail end of the rehabilitation process. The surgery postponed the recording sessions of The Devil Put Dinosaurs Here as Cantrell could not play guitar for eight months while he was recovering. While recuperating at home in a sling, Cantrell heard a riff in his head and sang it into his phone. The riff later became the song "Stone", the first single from The Devil Put Dinosaurs Here.

=== Substance abuse ===
Cantrell is a recovering addict and alcoholic and has been sober since 2003. He was awarded the 2012 Stevie Ray Vaughan Award from MusiCares, for his work helping other addicts with the recovery process.

== Charity contributions ==
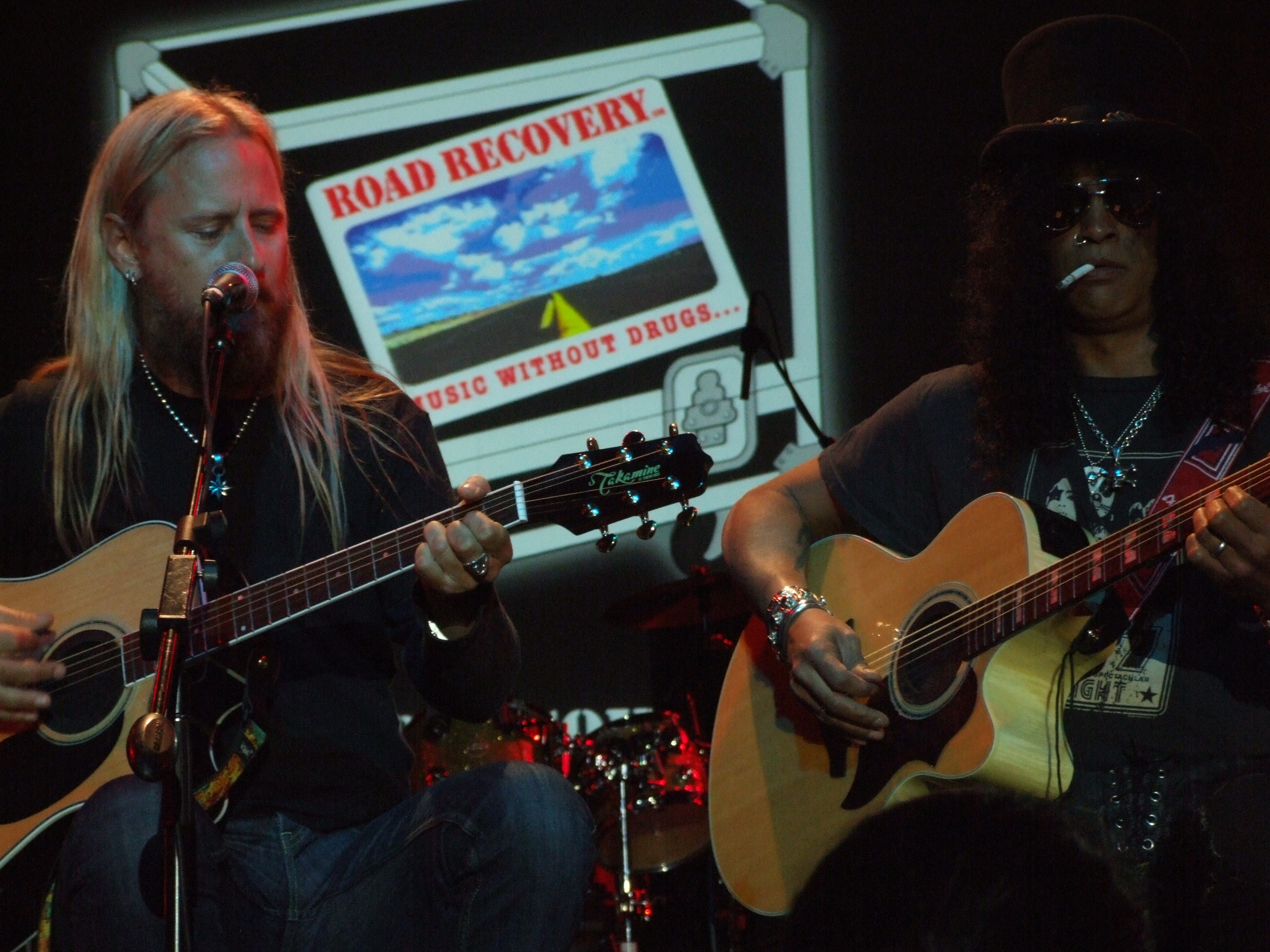
Cantrell and Slash playing an acoustic show for Road Recovery on The Nightwatchman's Justice tour at the Nokia Theater, New York on April 17, 2008

Cantrell is a longtime supporter of MusiCares MAP Fund, which helps musicians who are struggling with addiction, financial and health issues. He also supports Road Recovery, an organization dedicated to helping young people battling addiction.

In 1996, Cantrell became involved with anti-racism organisation Artists for a Hate Free America, alongside other musicians including Jeff Ament, Beck and Michael Stipe, to film public service announcements, and pose for a national ad campaign.

On April 12, 2004, Cantrell and his then-band Cardboard Vampyres performed at a benefit concert for Sweet Relief, a nonprofit organization that helps needy musicians cover medical expenses. On November 10, 2004, Cantrell was among the musicians who performed a short acoustic set to benefit Help The Homeless in Hollywood, California.

In 2007, Cantrell auctioned off some of his favorite clothes from key moments in his career to benefit MusiCares and the Layne Staley Fund, which provides support and treatment for heroin recovery in the Seattle music community.

Since 2009, Cantrell has hosted the Alice in Chains & Friends Charity Fantasy Football League. Each participant puts up an item for an online auction and all of the proceeds goes to the charity chosen by the champion of the league. Cantrell founded the league to combine his love of fantasy football with the goal of helping a worthy cause. Cantrell won the league for the first time in 2016, and in 2017 he decided to donate the proceeds to MusiCares in Chris Cornell's memory, and to Music for Relief in memory of Chester Bennington. Both musicians died in 2017. In 2018, Cantrell named the league's trophy after his friend Vinnie Paul, who had died recently.

Cantrell is a supporter of St. Jude Children's Research Hospital and has performed at benefit concerts and charity golf tournaments to raise funds for the hospital that treats children with cancer.

In 2015, Alice in Chains donated two dollars from every pre-sold ticket of their summer tour to help the family of a fan named Stefan Dayne-Ankle, who died after a battle with leukemia.

== Filmography ==
| Year | Title | Role | Notes |
|---|---|---|---|
| 1992 | Singles | Himself | |
| 1995 | The Nona Tapes | Nona Weisbaum | Short film |
| 1996 | Jerry Maguire | Jesus of CopyMat | |
| 1998, 2006 | Behind the Music | Himself | 2 episodes |
| 2004 | I Love the '90s | Himself | |
| 2006 | Deadwood | Man drinking at bar | Cameo |
| 2009 | Behind the Music Remastered | Himself | Episode: "Heart" |
| 2009 | Rock Slyde | Himself | |
| 2013 | AIC 23 | Donnie "Skeeter" Dollarhide Jr. | Short film |
| 2018 | Dad Band | Terry | Short film |
| 2019 | Deadwood: The Movie | Townsman | Cameo |

== Discography ==
=== Solo ===
| Year | Album details | Chart positions | | | |
| Year | Album details | US | AUS | CAN | NZ |
|---|---|---|---|---|---|
| 1998 | Boggy Depot: Released: March 31, 1998 (Vinyl record) April 7, 1998 (CD); Label: Columbia | 28 | 25 | 39 | 46 |
| 2002 | Degradation Trip: Released: June 18, 2002; Label: Roadrunner | 33 | 85 | — | — |
| 2002 | Degradation Trip Volumes 1 & 2: Released: November 26, 2002; Label: Roadrunner | — | — | — | — |
| 2021 | Brighten: Released: October 29, 2021; Label: Double J | — | 63 | — | — |
| 2024 | I Want Blood: Released: October 18, 2024; Label: Double J | 145 | — | — | — |
"—" denotes a release that did not chart.

=== Singles ===
| Year | Song | Chart positions | | | Album |
| Year | Song | US Alt. | US Main. | US Air. | Album |
|---|---|---|---|---|---|
| 1996 | "Leave Me Alone" | — | 14 | — | The Cable Guy soundtrack |
| 1998 | "Cut You In" | 15 | 5 | — | Boggy Depot |
| 1998 | "Dickeye" | — | 36 | — | Boggy Depot |
| 1998 | "My Song" | — | 6 | — | Boggy Depot |
| 2002 | "Anger Rising" | — | 10 | — | Degradation Trip |
| 2002 | "Angel Eyes" | — | — | — | Degradation Trip |
| 2017 | "A Job to Do" | — | — | — | John Wick: Chapter 2 (Original Motion Picture Soundtrack) |
| 2018 | "Setting Sun" | — | — | — | Dark Nights: Metal Soundtrack |
| 2021 | "Atone" | — | — | — | Brighten |
| 2021 | "Brighten" | — | 19 | 43 | Brighten |
| 2021 | "Siren Song" | — | — | — | Brighten |
| 2024 | "Vilified" | — | 10 | 15 | I Want Blood |
| 2024 | "Afterglow" | — | 23 | — | I Want Blood |
| 2024 | "I Want Blood" | — | — | — | I Want Blood |
"—" denotes a release that did not chart.

=== Music videos ===
| Year | Title | Director |
|---|---|---|
| 1996 | "Leave Me Alone" | Rocky Morton |
| 1998 | "Cut You In" | Peter Christopherson |
| 1998 | "My Song" | Rocky Schenck |
| 2002 | "Anger Rising" | P.R. Brown |
| 2017 | "A Job To Do" | Unknown |
| 2021 | "Atone" | Jim Louvau and Tony Aguilera |
| 2021 | "Brighten" | Gilbert Trejo |
| 2022 | "Siren Song" | Nate Merritt |
| 2022 | "Had to Know" | Jim Louvau |
| 2022 | "Prism of Doubt" | Zoe Katz |
| 2024 | "Vilified" | Lorenzo Diego Carrera |
| 2024 | "Afterglow" | Matt Mahurin |
| 2025 | "I Want Blood" | Bill Yukich |

=== With Ozzy Osbourne ===
- Prince of Darkness (2005) (disc four)
- Under Cover (2005)

=== Other appearances ===
- Magic & Madness – "Heaven & Hell" w/ Circus of Power (February 1993)
- Last Action Hero: Music from the Original Motion Picture – "various guitar ques" (June 1993)
- Hanging in the Balance – "Gods of a Second Chance" w/ Metal Church (October 1993)
- Twisted Willie: A Tribute to Willie Nelson – "I've Seen All This World I Care to See" (January 1996)
- The Cable Guy: Original Motion Picture Soundtrack – "Leave Me Alone" (May 1996)
- Blackacidevil – "See All You Were", "Come to Silver" and "Hand of Doom" w/ Danzig (October 1996)
- The Full Sentence – "Marry Me" w/ Pigeonhed (January 1997)
- Garage Inc. – "Tuesday's Gone" w/ Metallica (November 1998)
- The Deep End, Volume 1 – "Effigy" w/ Gov't Mule (October 2001)
- Live at Home – appeared on stage with Nickelback in January 2002, performing "It Ain't Like That"
- The Punisher: The Album – "Ashes to Ashes" w/ Damageplan (also featured on the Japan version of New Found Power; March 2004)
- Jupiters Darling – "Fallen Ones" w/ Heart (June 2004)
- Music for the Divine – "Misty Mountain Hop" w/ Glenn Hughes (January 2007)
- The Sun and the Earth - The Essential Stevie Salas Vol. 1 – "Soul Ecstacy" w/ Stevie Salas (April 2007)
- It's OK to Be Happy w/ Smith & Pyle (July 2008)
- Little Immaculate White Fox – "Anything" w/ Pearl Aday (January 2010)
- 24 Hours – "Love Is Blind" w/ Richie Kotzen (November 2011)
- How to Be a Man w/ Duff McKagan (May 2015)
- Gore – "Phantom Bride" w/ Deftones (April 2016)
- John Wick: Chapter 2 – Original Motion Picture Soundtrack – "A Job to Do" (February 2017)
- Dark Nights: Metal Soundtrack – Setting Sun (July 2018)
- Lighthouse – "I Just Don't Know" w/Duff McKagan (October 2023)
- Sinners: Original Motion Picture Soundtrack – "In Moonlight" w/Ludwig Göransson (April 2025)
