= Carl Colt =

Carl Colt may refer to:

- Carl Colt (musician), on Little Immaculate White Fox
- Carl Colt, character in Wimbledon (film)
