= Dark Nights: Metal =

DC Comics miniseries

- Cover of Dark Nights: Metal #1 (October 2017), art by Greg Capullo, Jonathan Glapion and FCO Plascencia
- Publisher: DC Comics
- Publication date: June 2017 – March 2018
Title(s)
"Dark Nights: Metal" #1-#6 (6 issues)
- Main character(s): Bruce Wayne / Batman; Kal-El / Clark Kent / Superman; Diana Prince / Wonder Woman; Barry Allen / The Flash; Victor Stone / Cyborg; Kendra Saunders / Shiera Hall / Hawkgirl; Hal Jordan / Green Lantern; Arthur Curry / Aquaman; Justice League; Barbatos; The Batman Who Laughs

Creative team
- Writer: Scott Snyder
- Penciller: Greg Capullo
- Inker: Jonathan Glapion
- Colorist: FCO Plascencia

"Dark Nights: Metal" is a 2017–2018 monthly crossover comic book storyline published by the comic book publishing company DC Comics, which consisted of a core eponymous miniseries, and a number of other tie-in books. Premiering in June 2017 and lasting until April 2018, the plot was written by Scott Snyder, with art by Greg Capullo, Jonathan Glapion and FCO Plascencia. The story closely links with Snyder and Capullo's run on Batman during The New 52 DC relaunch.

The story involves Batman discovering a Dark Multiverse that exists beneath the core DC multiverse. It is revealed that both multiverses are connected through mysterious metals that Batman has encountered over the years. His investigations eventually result in him releasing seven evil versions of himself from the Dark Multiverse, led by the dark god known as Barbatos, who plans to unleash darkness across every Earth.

A soundtrack featuring songs inspired by the graphic novel was released as an exclusive vinyl picture disc on September 28, 2018. The six-track EP features heavy metal songs by Jerry Cantrell, Chino Moreno, Brann Dailor, Maria Brink, Alexis Krauss and Jason Aalon Butler.

== Publication history ==
DC Comics first announced the details of "Dark Nights: Metal" at Fan Expo Dallas in April 2017. The company revealed that the event would feature the reunion of Scott Snyder and Greg Capullo after their widely acclaimed New 52 Batman run. The series, which debuted in June 2017, is the culmination of their Batman story arcs, which includes The Court of Owls, Death of the Family, Zero Year, and Endgame. Snyder stated, "I've been writing Metal as long as I've been writing Batman."

The idea of creating a dark multiverse came from Snyder, who was inspired by watching the science documentary television series Cosmos: A Spacetime Odyssey with his five-year-old son. He became fascinated with the concept of dark matter, prompting him to question "What if the Multiverse essentially has these 52 universes, but has almost this ocean of possibility, this ocean of almost reactive matter beneath it that's like a Dark Multiverse". Aside the seven featured Dark Knights in the finished comic book, Snyder planned more dark Batmen that got ultimately cut; these included a Punisher-esque Batman, a dark magic-wielding Batman, a Batman who grew up as a patient in Arkham Asylum after being accused of his parents' murder, a Batman who merged with his whole rogues gallery and one who merged with Gotham City itself.

Dark Nights: Metal also marks the first appearance of Dream of the Endless from Neil Gaiman's The Sandman (1989–1996) in the post-New 52 DC Universe. According to Snyder, he wanted to make the story unforgettable and have a character help guide the superheroes through the unknown. When he realized Dream would be a good fit, he reached out to Gaiman for permission to use him. "I was so excited... [Gaiman] couldn't have been more generous", he said. "It's literally one of the best moments of my career, to be able to get to write a character that meant so much to me growing up and still does".

In June 2017, DC announced seven one-shot comics that tie into the story of "Dark Nights: Metal": Batman: The Red Death, Batman: The Murder Machine, Batman: The Dawnbreaker, Batman: The Drowned, Batman: The Merciless, Batman: The Devastator, and The Batman Who Laughs. DC stated, "Each one-shot story spotlights a different, corrupted version of Batman spawned from the Dark Multiverse to wreak havoc on Earth."

The following month, DC announced Batman: Lost written by Scott Snyder with art by Olivier Coipel and Bengal. Snyder states, "the single issue story will strand Batman alone in the Dark Multiverse, where he will face his greatest fears."

At the 2017 Comic-Con International, an additional tie-in one-shot was announced called Hawkman Found written by Jeff Lemire with art by Bryan Hitch and Kevin Nowlan. As the title implies, it focused on the connection between Hawkman and the events of "Dark Nights: Metal" and it is positioned as a sequel to Batman Lost. Lemire revealed that it "re-positions one of DC's oldest, most iconic and most confusing characters ahead of a possible new ongoing in the new year."

In September 2017, DC announced, without a specific reason, that issue #4 would be delayed by a week. This led to the one-shot comic, Hawkman Found, being delayed by a week as well.

DC announced another delay without reason in October 2017 and issue #5 was released three weeks later than the originally scheduled date.

The series' sequel, "Dark Nights: Death Metal" by Snyder and Capullo, was announced for May 2020. "Dark Nights: Metal" and "Death Metal" have collectively been dubbed "Metal Wars" by reviewers.

== Synopsis ==
=== Prelude ===
Hal Jordan is summoned by Ganthet to investigate a dark presence that he senses on Earth, the location of which is revealed to be the Batcave. Upon his arrival, he meets Duke Thomas. As they investigate, they stumble upon a hidden room in the Batcave, where they hear a mysterious voice that lures them in. This leads them to a cell where Batman has imprisoned the Joker.

Meanwhile, Batman has been investigating random frequencies across Earth, which he believes are a part of a bigger mystery that he has been investigating for years regarding mysterious metals and dark energy. He enlists the help of Mister Terrific to collect more data from Earth-Two. After conferring with him, he realizes that he needs to use the Anti-Monitor tower at the Fortress of Solitude to further his investigations.

Batman continues his investigation by seeking out Hephaestus, but learns from Wonder Woman that the Greek gods have abandoned Earth. However, she has been given a weapon forged for Apollo called the Sunblade that she has been instructed to give to Batman. This leads him to an encounter with Talia al Ghul, with Batman trading the Sunblade for a dagger forged by the wizard Shazam. The dagger is made of one of the metals Batman has been searching for.

Joker escapes from the Batcave and smashes a machine that Batman has built, claiming that it will herald the end of the world. Batman explains that he needed the machine to peer into the source of visions he had been seeing from the Dark Multiverse. Batman receives a vision of complete darkness, while a group of dark figures exclaim that the seal has been broken and that the Dark Knights are coming, implying that Batman opened up a door to the Dark Multiverse.

=== Plot ===
The Justice League finds that Challengers Mountain, the headquarters of the Challengers of the Unknown, has mysteriously appeared in Gotham City. When they get into the mountain, the League encounters Kendra Saunders, who warns them of a full-scale invasion. She explains the concept of a Dark Multiverse, a multiverse that exists beneath the DC Multiverse, that contains a dark beast named Barbatos. Through her investigations, she has discovered a connection between Barbatos and the Wayne family. Batman is revealed to be part of a prophecy in which he will be treated by five divine metals that will open a door to the Dark Multiverse and allow Barbatos to invade the multiverse. It is further revealed that Barbatos first marked Batman when he was sent back in time by Darkseid's Omega Beams during the events of the Final Crisis storyline. Despite this, Batman steals Kendra's sample of Nth Metal, one of the divine metals. The metal leads Batman to the journal of Carter Hall, discovered to have been in Wayne Manor the whole time. The journal confirms Batman's suspicions regarding his role in the prophecy.

Batman reveals that he has previously exposed to the divine metals: electrum, dionesium, promethium, and Nth Metal. In an attempt to escape the last metal, Batman steals Darkseid, who has been reduced to a baby. He aims to use Darkseid's Omega Beams to go back in time again and prevent Barbatos from meeting him. However, Batman is tricked by the Court of Owls and exposed to the last divine metal: batmanium. This causes Batman to exchange places with Barbatos and seven dark versions of himself from the Dark Multiverse.

Mister Terrific interprets vibrations coming from Plastic Man's egg which indicate the coordinates of four locations that need to be investigated. Wonder Woman, Doctor Fate and Kendra Saunders go to investigate the Rock of Eternity. Green Lantern and Mister Terrific head to the remains of Thanagar. Aquaman and Deathstroke go to Atlantis. Finally, Superman has Steel and the Flash create a path into the Dark Multiverse for him through the Phantom Zone. Once he arrives, Superman realizes that it was a trap set by the Dark Knights so that they can harness the energy from his cells to power their doomsday device, which would unleash their reality into the multiverse.

While searching for Nth Metal at the Rock of Eternity, Wonder Woman, Doctor Fate and Kendra Saunders face the personification of the Seven Sins. Kendra tries to fire the Anti-Monitor's astral brain into the center of the multiverse as an attempt to stop the Dark Multiverse, but is interrupted by Barbatos, who transforms her into a dark-hawk version of herself named Lady Blackhawk. Fate is confronted by Black Adam, who alongside Vandal Savage, have brokered a deal with Barbatos. At the outskirts of Atlantis, Aquaman and Deathstroke enter the burial ground of Atlantis' first king, Arion. Meanwhile, Hal Jordan and Mr. Terrific reach Thanagar and learn that has been conquered by Onimar Synn and Starro. They have known of the Dark Multiverse's existence for eons and have prepared to "raze the Earth" with a doomsday device called the Phoenix Cannon. Starro neutralizes Lantern and Terrific and the two are incarcerated.

Daniel Hall rescues Batman and Superman, to whom he explains the history of the multiverse. Alongside the Monitor and the Anti-Monitor, there is a third being: a "Forger" tasked to watch over what had yet to come. Within the Dark Multiverse is a "World Forge", which creates new universes from the hopes and fears of all living beings. Barbatos was originally meant to destroy unstable worlds, but killed his creator, which corrupted the Forge as dark universes were allowed to persist. Convinced that there is still hope, Superman and Batman head for the Forge of Worlds, but are confronted by the Dragon of Barbatos — a corrupted Carter Hall.

On Thanagar Prime, Hal and Mr. Terrific are rescued from their cells by Martian Manhunter (who has been exploring Thanagar Prime to learn about the secret Nth Metal deposits) and the trio proceed to rescue Plastic Man from Synn and Starro. They soon learn several Dark Knights have seized control of the Phoenix Cannon, reversing its polarity to make Earth sink further into the Dark Multiverse.

Kendra regains control of her body after Wonder Woman uses her lasso on her, restoring Kendra's memories. Both are beaten by The Batman Who Laughs, who explains that all the heroes have done is help accelerate Barbatos' plans and that Earth is now low enough for Barbatos' army to claim it. Refusing to give up, Diana and Kendra use the Rock of Eternity's core to reach Barbatos and are confronted by his Dark Army. Reaching the Dark Forge, Kendra manages to break Carter out of Barbatos' corruption, reigniting the Forge in the process. Barbatos is confronted by the Flash and Cyborg, who have gathered reinforcements from other realities.

Refusing to lose, Barbatos reveals his last resort; using the combined power of the positive energy of his prisoner the Over-Monitor, the Anti-Monitor's brain, and the Batman Who Laughs' dark energy, he plans to destroy all of creation and leave nothing but darkness in his wake. An unexpected team-up of Batman and the Joker, however, halts this plan, the Justice League defeats the remaining Dark Knights, and Hawkgirl subdues Barbatos. After the Over-Monitor explains that all living things have trace amounts of Tenth Metal, the League use this power to pull Earth out of the Dark Multiverse, which inadvertently shatters the Source Wall. After the battle, the Over-Monitor chains Barbatos at the bottom of the Dark Multiverse.

=== Epilogue ===
The Justice League, with the inclusion of the Martian Manhunter and Hawkgirl, are invited to a gala dinner at Wayne Manor. They speak of their victory against Barbatos, Hawkman recovering on Blackhawk Island and having written about mysterious glimpses of what is to come. Most importantly, they address cracking the Source Wall, a matter of utmost importance.

During the after-dinner party, Bruce, Diana, and Clark talk more about the possible incoming threats now that the multiverse has been expanded, including a hidden threat they have not yet told anyone else about. Bruce tells his friends not to worry, as he has a plan. On the desk of his study lay a number of blueprints for a Hall of Justice.

=== Aftermath ===
During the event, portals were created over Gotham City which Derek James fell into and gained the abilities of trans-dimensional travel.

== Titles involved ==
Title	Issue(s)	Publication date(s)	Writer(s)	Artist(s)	Colorist(s)	Note(s)
Preludes
Dark Days: The Forge	#1	June 14, 2017	Scott Snyder, James Tynion IV	Jim Lee, Scott Williams, Andy Kubert, Klaus Janson, John Romita Jr., Danny Miki	Alex Sinclair, Jeremiah Skipper	
Dark Days: The Casting	#1	July 12, 2017	Scott Snyder, James Tynion IV	Jim Lee, Scott Williams, Andy Kubert, Klaus Janson, John Romita Jr., Danny Miki	Alex Sinclair, Jeremiah Skipper	
Main series
Dark Nights: Metal	#1–6	August 16, 2017 – March 28, 2018	Scott Snyder	Greg Capullo, Jonathan Glapion	FCO Plascencia	
Tie-ins
Batman: The Red Death	#1	September 20, 2017	Joshua Williamson	Carmine Di Giandomenico	Ivan Plascencia	The "Dark Knights" one-shots
Batman: The Murder Machine	#1	September 27, 2017	Frank Tieri	Riccardo Federici	Rain Beredo	The "Dark Knights" one-shots
Batman: The Dawnbreaker	#1	October 4, 2017	Sam Humphries	Ethan Van Sciver	Jason Wright	The "Dark Knights" one-shots
Batman: The Drowned	#1	October 18, 2017	Dan Abnett	Philip Tan, Tyler Kirkham	Dean White, Arif Prianto	The "Dark Knights" one-shots
Batman: The Merciless	#1	October 25, 2017	Peter J. Tomasi	Francis Manapul		The "Dark Knights" one-shots
Batman: The Devastator	#1	November 1, 2017	Frank Tieri, James Tynion IV	Tony S. Daniel, Danny Miki	Tomeu Morey	The "Dark Knights" one-shots
The Batman Who Laughs	#1	November 15, 2017	James Tynion IV	Riley Rossmo	Ivan Plascencia	The "Dark Knights" one-shots
Batman: Lost	#1	November 8, 2017	Scott Snyder, James Tynion IV, Joshua Williamson	Doug Mahnke, Jaime Mendoza, Jorge Jimenez, Yanick Paquette	Wil Quintana, Nathan Fairbairn, Alejandro Sanchez	Interlude between Metal issues #3 and 4
Hawkman: Found	#1	December 27, 2017	Jeff Lemire	Bryan Hitch, Kevin Nowlan	Alex Sinclair, Jeremiah Skipper	Interlude between Metal issues #4 and 5
Dark Knights Rising: The Wild Hunt	#1	February 14, 2018	Scott Snyder, Grant Morrison, James Tynion IV, Joshua Williamson	Howard Porter, Jorge Jiménez, Doug Mahnke, Jaime Mendoza	Hi-Fi Design, Alejandro Sanchez, Wil Quintana	Interlude between Metal issues #5 and 6
Teen Titans (vol. 6)	#12	September 13, 2017	Benjamin Percy	Mirka Andolfo	Romulo Fajardo, Jr.	"Gotham Resistance" story line
Nightwing (vol. 4)	#29	September 20, 2017	Tim Seeley	Paul Pelletier, Andrew Hennessy	Adriano Lucas	"Gotham Resistance" story line
Suicide Squad (vol. 5)	#26	September 27, 2017	Rob Williams	Stjepan Šejić		"Gotham Resistance" story line
Green Arrow (vol. 6)	#32	October 4, 2017	Benjamin Percy, Joshua Williamson	Juan Ferreyra		"Gotham Resistance" story line
The Flash (vol. 5)	#33	October 25, 2017	Joshua Williamson	Howard Porter	Hi-Fi Design	"Bats Out of Hell" story line
Justice League (vol. 3)	#32–33	November 1, 2017 – November 15, 2017	Robert Venditti, Joshua Williamson	Liam Sharp, Tyler Kirkham, Mikel Janin	Adam Brown, Arif Prianto, Jeromy Cox	"Bats Out of Hell" story line
Hal Jordan and the Green Lantern Corps	#32	November 8, 2017	Robert Venditti	Ethan Van Sciver, Liam Sharp	Jason Wright	"Bats Out of Hell" story line

== Reception ==
Aggregate scores
Comic Book Roundup
Issue	Rating	Reviews	Reference
1	8.8/10	46	
2	8.8/10	37	
3	8.2/10	37	
4	8.6/10	34	
5	8.6/10	32	
6	8.4/10	38	

The review aggregator website Comic Book Roundup, gave issue #1 an average score of 8.8 out of 10 based on 46 critics. Kieran Shiach of Comic Book Resources (CBR) wrote "Ultimately, Dark Nights: Metal is just outright fun. Snyder, Capullo and their collaborators really leaned into the ecstatic lunacy of superhero comics towards the end of their Batman run and Metal feels like the next logical step." Jesse Schedeen from IGN gave the issue an 8.4 out of 10 writing, "Apart from a surprisingly sluggish middle act, Dark Nights: Metal #1 is a terrifically enjoyable read. This issue crams in all the adventure and bombast that was promised, but also makes it clear that Batman is confronting one of the most dire and all-encompassing threats of his career." Pierce Lydon from Newsarama gave it an 8 out of 10 saying, "Dark Nights: Metal is a great event book because it is true to its characters and it's deeper than just its surface 'Justice League vs. Evil Batmen' premise."

Comic Book Roundup gave issue #2 an average score of 8.8 out of 10 based on 37 critics. Jim Johnson of CBR praised the issue, and the story-line, for giving Batman a larger role in the DC Universe, saying "Dark Nights: Metal, though, has so far not only given his character fantastically plausible reasons to get out of Gotham, but to take a central role in a storyline that reaches much farther." Schedeen gave it an 8.5 saying "While Metal still has a few kinks to iron out before it can rival the best of Snyder and Capullo's work, the series is delivering plenty of drama and spectacle as it explores the collision between the DCU and the Dark Multiverse."

Comic Book Roundup gave issue #3 an average score of 8.2 out of 10 based on 30 critics. Jim Johnson of CBR applauds the issue for providing Superman as a bright contrast from Batman, he says "The presence of Superman dilutes the darkness, if only a little, and is exemplified here in his optimistic, albeit false for now, hopes of finding and rescuing his crimefighting partner." Schedeen gave it a 7.2 saying "Unfortunately, this issue seems prone to biting off more than it can chew, resorting in a number of exposition-driven sequences that slow down an otherwise exciting storyline."

== Soundtrack ==
DC and Warner Bros. collaborated on a soundtrack featuring songs inspired by Dark Nights: Metal. The soundtrack was produced by Tyler Bates and Mike Elizondo, and was released as a six-track EP exclusively on 12" vinyl on September 28, 2018. The pressing was limited to 4,000 copies and the EP was also accompanied by a poster and a 32-page comic book.

=== Track listing ===
Side A

No.	Title	Writer(s)	Artist	Length
1.	"Red Death"	Brann Dailor, Mike Elizondo, Tyler Bates	Brann Dailor	5:37
2.	"Brief Exchange"	Chino Moreno, Elizondo, Bates	Chino Moreno	4:48
3.	"War Cry"	Alexis Krauss, Elizondo, Bates	Alexis Krauss	3:37

Side B

No.	Title	Writer(s)	Artist	Length
1.	"Fact Check"	Chris Chaney, Gil Sharone, Butler, Elizondo, Bates	Jason Aalon Butler	4:06
2.	"The Calling"	Chris Howorth, Maria Brink, Elizondo, Bates	Maria Brink & Chris Howorth	4:44
3.	"Setting Sun"	Jerry Cantrell, Elizondo, Bates	Jerry Cantrell	4:30
Total length:				26:02

== Collected editions ==
Title	Material collected	Published date	ISBN
Dark Days: The Road to Metal	Dark Days: The Forge #1, Dark Days: The Casting #1, Nightwing (vol. 4) #17, Final Crisis #6–7, Batman: The Return of Bruce Wayne #1, Batman (vol. 2) #38–39 and material from Detective Comics #950	May 2018	978-1401278199
Dark Nights: Metal — The Deluxe Edition	Dark Nights: Metal #1–6	June 2018	978-1401277321
Dark Nights: Metal	Dark Nights: Metal #1–6, Dark Knights Rising: The Wild Hunt #1 and Batman: Lost #1	January 2019	978-1401288587
Absolute Dark Nights: Metal	Dark Nights: Metal #1–6,Batman: Lost #1, Dark Nights: Metal Director's Cut #1, Dark Knights Rising: The Wild Hunt #1	November 2022	978-1779515278
Dark Nights: Metal — Dark Knights Rising	Batman: The Red Death #1, Batman: The Devastator #1, Batman: The Merciless #1, Batman: The Murder Machine #1, Batman: The Drowned #1, Batman: The Dawnbreaker #1, The Batman Who Laughs (vol. 1) #1, Dark Knights Rising: The Wild Hunt #1	June 2018	978-1401289072
Dark Nights: Metal — The Resistance	Teen Titans (vol. 6) #12, Nightwing (vol. 4) #29, Suicide Squad (vol. 5) #26, Green Arrow (vol. 6) #32, The Flash (vol. 5) #33, Hal Jordan and the Green Lantern Corps #32, Justice League (vol. 3) #32–33, Batman: Lost #1, Hawkman: Found #1	July 2018	978-1401282981
The Batman Who Laughs	The Batman Who Laughs (vol. 2) #1–7, The Batman Who Laughs: The Grim Knight #1	September 2019	978-1401294038
Dark Nights: Metal Omnibus	Dark Nights: Metal #1–6, Batman: Lost #1, Dark Nights: Metal Director's Cut #1, Dark Knights Rising: The Wild Hunt #1, Dark Days: The Forge #1, Dark Days: The Casting #1, Batman: The Red Death #1, Batman: The Devastator #1, Batman: The Merciless #1, Batman: The Murder Machine #1, Batman: The Drowned #1, Batman: The Dawnbreaker #1, The Batman Who Laughs #1, Teen Titans (vol. 6) #12, Nightwing (vol. 4) #29, Suicide Squad (vol. 5) #26, Green Arrow (vol. 6) #32, The Flash (vol. 5) #33, Hal Jordan and the Green Lantern Corps #32, Justice League (vol. 3) #32–33, Hawkman: Found #1	January 2023	978-1779517036
Dark Nights: Metal Compact Comics Edition	Dark Nights: Metal #1-6, Batman: Lost #1, Dark Knights Rising: The Wild Hunt #1	August 2026	978-1799508809

== Follow-up lines ==
With the end of Dark Nights: Metal, new titles were spun out due to the aftermath:

- New Justice: An aftermath that became a relaunch for several DC Universe mainline comics.
- The New Age of DC Heroes: Debuting new characters and stories related to the repercussions of Dark Nights: Metal.
- The Sandman Universe: Featuring the return of several characters from The Sandman by Neil Gaiman.
- Year of the Villain: In March 2019, Scott Snyder announced a new event campaign titled Year of the Villain, which features the repercussions of Dark Nights: Metal from the supervillains' perspective.
- Tales from the Dark Multiverse: A series of one-off comics that take some of DC's most famous events and put a tragic twist on them, with Batman: Knightfall and The Death of Superman to start. DC Comics has teased other tales such as Teen Titans: The Judas Contract, Infinite Crisis, and Blackest Night.
- Dark Nights: Death Metal is the sequel to Dark Nights: Metal, with Snyder stating: "Everything is coming back, we want to pay it forward. The Omega Titans, Barbatos, the Forge, it's all coming back. Everything you read, our goal is to reward. All of it culminates in like a year in like a Metal event."
