= John Wick: Chapter 2 (soundtrack) =

John Wick: Chapter 2 (Original Motion Picture Soundtrack)

Soundtrack album by Tyler Bates and Joel J. Richard
- Released: February 10, 2017
- Genres: Rock; hip hop; electronic
- Length: 73:05
- Label: Varèse Sarabande
- Producers: Tyler Bates; Joel J. Richard

Tyler Bates chronology
The Belko Experiment (2016)	John Wick: Chapter 2 (2017)	Guardians of the Galaxy Vol. 2 (2017)

Joel J. Richard chronology
John Wick (2014)	John Wick: Chapter 2 (2017)	Billionaire Boys Club (2018)

Singles from John Wick: Chapter 2 (Original Motion Picture Soundtrack)
- 1. "A Job to Do" Released: February 9, 2017

John Wick: Chapter 2 (Original Motion Picture Soundtrack) is the soundtrack album to the 2017 film John Wick: Chapter 2. The second instalment in the John Wick franchise and a sequel to 2014 action film John Wick, the film stars Keanu Reeves in the title character, and is directed by Chad Stahelski. The album featured 23 tracks from the original score composed by Tyler Bates and Joel J. Richard, plus songs performed by Le Castle Vania and Ciscandra Nostalghia, all of them contributed to the first film's soundtrack. Jerry Cantrell, guitarist and co-lead vocalist of Alice in Chains performed an original song titled "A Job to Do", released on February 9, 2017. The album was released by Varèse Sarabande on the following day, along with the film.

== Development ==
Tyler Bates and Joel J. Richard returned to score for John Wick: Chapter 2 after previously scoring for the first film. Bates called the score as "more aggressive" and "frenetic" than the first film, which Richard recalled that Stahelski insisted to use Italian influence for the story that is set in Rome, that inspired the instrumental uses of cello, mandolin, operatic vocals and influence of Antonio Vivaldi's compositions, which was "a matter of finding instrumentation and a musical language that alluded to Italy's rich musical history while working within the gritty and modern sound of John Wick". Bates added that the mixture of opera into the score "made the dark sense of humor (buried in the floor with John's weapons and coins) rather apparent." Experimenting with the themes, Bates used the gun rhythms and designed the score and soundtrack based on that, as the film had multiple gunshots. Stahelski added "You don't want the music to be in conflict with the actual, practical onscreen sounds."

Ciscandra Nostalghia performed two songs for Chapter 2's soundtrack: "Plastic Heart" and "Coronation". Speaking of his collaboration with Bates, Nostalghia said "He [Bates] really understands the emotional properties of darkness. He's able to translate it beautifully into music without completely depleting you or serotonin. There's still an ounce of hope which I personally feel is very important. So we've created some wonderfully heavy songs together and the collaborations have been a real experience."

Le Castle Vania also performed the track "John Wick Mode" written by Dylan Eiland, and Jerry Cantrell, guitarist and co-lead vocalist of Alice in Chains performed the original song "A Job to Do". He wrote the song lyrics from John Wick's perspective, and Cantrell explained that "Writing specifically for a movie was kind of fun. It almost felt like an assignment that I gave to myself. It's not unlike how I normally write from a personal point of view, whether mine or someone else's." The song was released as a single from the film at the Billboard website on February 9, 2017 and was accompanied by a music video featuring Cantrell and Reeves, that was released on March 21, 2017 through YouTube. On December 6, 2019, the song was performed live by Cantrell at the Pico Union Project in Los Angeles, with Bates playing guitar at the concert.

== Release ==
The John Wick: Chapter 2 soundtrack was released by Varèse Sarabande on February 10, 2017, the same day as the film. It was first released in digital formats, and was physically released on March 10, 2017. A two-disc vinyl edition was released on November 15, 2019, along with the vinyl soundtracks for its predecessor (John Wick) and successor (Chapter 3 – Parabellum).

== Track listing ==
All tracks are written by Tyler Bates and Joel J. Richard, except where noted.

No.	Title	Length
1.	"Plastic Heart" (performed by Ciscandra Nostalghia)	2:05
2.	"Shark Chevelle"	1:18
3.	"Man Of Focus"	3:24
4.	"Sumo Showdown"	3:21
5.	"Peace and Vodka"	3:00
6.	"Missing Helen"	2:16
7.	"Back In The Ground"	2:23
8.	"Santino"	5:49
9.	"Walk To Museum"	1:04
10.	"Guns And Turtlenecks"	1:41
11.	"Wick In Rome"	2:29
12.	"Suits Maps and Guns"	5:05
13.	"Coronation" (written by Bates only; performed by Ciscandra Nostalghia)	2:59
14.	"John Wick Mode" (written by Dylan Eiland; performed by Le Castle Vania)	3:07
15.	"Razor Bath"	5:30
16.	"Catacombs"	3:49
17.	"La Vendetta"	3:40
18.	"Fountain Foes"	2:07
19.	"Knives On A Train"	2:42
20.	"Presto Museum Battle" (incorporated from Antonio Vivaldi's original composition by Joel J. Richard)	2:54
21.	"Mirror Mayhem"	4:29
22.	"John Wick Reckoning"	3:02
23.	"A Job to Do" (written and performed by Jerry Cantrell)	4:51
Total length:		73:05

== Personnel ==
Credits adapted from AllMusic.

- All music composed and produced by: Tyler Bates, Joel J. Richard
- Featuring artists: Ciscandra Nostalghia, Le Castle Vania, Jerry Cantrell
- Bass vocals: Tyler Bates
- Guitar: Jerry Cantrell
- Drums: Gil Sharone
- Financial director: Chris Brown
- Programming: Justin Burnett, Dieter Hartmann, Tim Williams
- Engineer: Paul Fig
- Mastering: Patricia Sullivan
- Mixing: Joel Richard, Wolfgang Matthes
- Score preparation: Joanne Higginbottom
- Music supervisor: John Houlihan
- Music business affairs: Raha Johartchi, Jessica Villar, Lenny Wohl
- Music coordinator: John Katovsich, Lilly Reid, Ryan Svendsen, Nikki Triplett, Jessica Villar
- Music clearance and licensing: Matt Lilley
- Executive producer: Robert Townson
- Executive director: Nikki Triplett, Raha Johartchi
- General manager: Lenny Wohl
- Executive in charge of music: Amy Dunning
