= I Want Blood =

Studio album by Jerry Cantrell
- Released: October 18, 2024
- Studios: JHOC (Pasadena, California)
- Genres: Alternative metal; grunge; alternative rock; sludge metal
- Length: 46:06
- Label: Double J Music
- Producer: Joe Barresi

Jerry Cantrell chronology
Brighten (2021)	I Want Blood (2024)

Singles from I Want Blood
- 1. "Vilified" Released: July 26, 2024; 2. "Afterglow" Released: September 6, 2024

Professional ratings
Review scores
Source	Rating
AllMusic	4/5 stars
Blabbermouth.net	9/10
Classic Rock	4/5 stars
Kerrang!	4/5

I Want Blood is the fourth solo album by American guitarist and vocalist Jerry Cantrell, released on October 18, 2024. The album contains contributions from other rock artists, including Robert Trujillo, Duff McKagan, and Greg Puciato.

Following the country and southern rock influences on Cantrel's album Brighten (2021), I Want Blood is viewed as a return to the dark, metal influenced style Cantrel is best known for and similarities to his group Alice in Chains.

Loudwire ranked it as the 2nd best rock album of 2024.

== Writing and production ==
Cantrell described himself as at the "top of his capacity" when writing and recording I Want Blood. Influences on the record's sound included Jeff Beck, the Cure, Pink Floyd and Robin Trower, with the album's use of dual guitars drawing heavily from Aerosmith, Iron Maiden, Judas Priest, Metallica, Scorpions and Thin Lizzy. Among the guitars Cantrell used on the album was a Gibson Les Paul Junior given to him several years prior by Billie Joe Armstrong of Green Day. The record was produced by Joe Barresi, who had worked in the past with acts including The Jesus Lizard, Melvins and Tool.

== Content ==
I Want Blood was described by Kerrang! as a "more oppressive" album than its immediate predecessor Brighten (2021) and by Guitar Player as "exceedingly heavy, even for Cantrell". Whereas Brighten pursued a lighter, country and southern rock-tinted sound, Cantrell returned to the metal-influenced sound, characterised by heavy riffs, of his work with Alice in Chains; Tuonela Magazine stated that the darker, heavy sound "almost make this effort sound like a sequel" to Cantrell's second studio album, Degradation Trip (2002).

The song "Off The Rails" was described by Blabbermouth as recalling Alice in Chains's 1990s era with vocalist Layne Staley, featuring what Amit Sharma called a "cheeky nod" to "Wasted Years" (1986) by Iron Maiden. The title track was described by Kerrang! as having "gallop that characterises Queens Of The Stone Age's more celebrated music", by KNAC to have a Foo Fighters-esque "holler-along chorus" and by LouderSound to have a "punk rock energy"; Cantrell himself described the song as having an "80s new wave vibe to it, especially in the chorus. Maybe even Cure-ish". "Echoes of Laughter" recalled the country-influenced sound of Brighten; Emma Johnston described the track as a "tar-textured western rooting for the guy in the black hat". The closing track, "It Comes", which Blabbermouth said to have "atmospheric passages" and "distant instrumentals", has been likened to Pink Floyd.

== Promotion and touring ==
On July 31, 2024, Cantrell released the music video for the upcoming album titled "Vilified". On October 15, 2024, Cantrell announced a North American tour for 2025 along with rock band Filter.

== Release ==
I Want Blood was released via digital download and on physical CD on October 18, 2024.

A deluxe edition of the album was released via digital download and on vinyl on January 31, 2025. The deluxe edition features spoken word versions of all nine songs from I Want Blood, accompanied by unique musical scores from various contributors.

== Track listing ==
All music and lyrics written by Jerry Cantrell, except where noted.

I Want Blood track listing
No.	Title	Writer(s)	Length
1.	"Vilified"		4:32
2.	"Off the Rails"		5:26
3.	"Afterglow"		4:38
4.	"I Want Blood"		4:22
5.	"Echoes of Laughter"	Cantrell, Tyler Bates	5:11
6.	"Throw Me a Line"		5:01
7.	"Let It Lie"		5:45
8.	"Held Your Tongue"		4:46
9.	"It Comes"		6:32
Total length:			46:06

Deluxe edition bonus tracks
No.	Title	Lyrics	Music	Length
1.	"Vilified (spoken word)"		Maxwell Urasky	1:44
2.	"Off the Rails (spoken word)"		Joe Barresi	2:43
3.	"Afterglow (spoken word)"		Greg Puciato	2:09
4.	"I Want Blood (spoken word)"		Vincent Jones, George Adrian	2:36
5.	"Echoes of Laughter (spoken word)"	Cantrell, Bates	Roy Mayorga	2:08
6.	"Throw Me a Line (spoken word)"		Gil Sharone, Rani Sharone	2:24
7.	"Let It Lie (spoken word)"		Mayorga	2:07
8.	"Held Your Tongue (spoken word)"		Michael Rozon	3:34
9.	"It Comes (spoken word)"		Urasky	1:54
Total length:				21:19

== Personnel ==
Musicians

- Jerry Cantrell – lead vocals, lead guitar, bass
- Greg Puciato – background vocals on "Echoes of Laughter"
- Duff McKagan – bass guitar on "Afterglow", "I Want Blood" and "Echoes of Laughter"
- Gil Sharone – drums on "Vilified", "Off the Rails", "Afterglow", "Echoes of Laughter", "Throw Me a Line", "Held Your Tongue" and "It Comes"; intro, verse, and outro for "Let It Lie"
- Mike Bordin – drums on "I Want Blood" and chorus parts for "Let It Lie"
- Robert Trujillo – bass on "Vilified", "Off the Rails" and "It Comes"
- Vincent Jones – keyboards on "Afterglow", "I Want Blood", "Echoes of Laughter" and "Held Your Tongue"
- Lola Colette – background vocals

Technical

- Jerry Cantrell – production, mixing, engineering
- Bob Ludwig – mastering
- Jun Murakawa – additional engineering
- Bob Jackson – mastering assistance
- Brian Lee – mastering assistance

Visuals

- Ryan Clark – art direction, design
- Darren Craig – photography

== Charts ==
Chart performance for I Want Blood
Chart (2024)	Peak position
Scottish Albums (Official Charts)	21
Swiss Albums (Schweizer Hitparade)	40
UK Albums (Official Charts)	99
UK Rock & Metal Albums (Official Charts)	3
US Billboard 200	145
