= Circus of Power =

American hard rock band

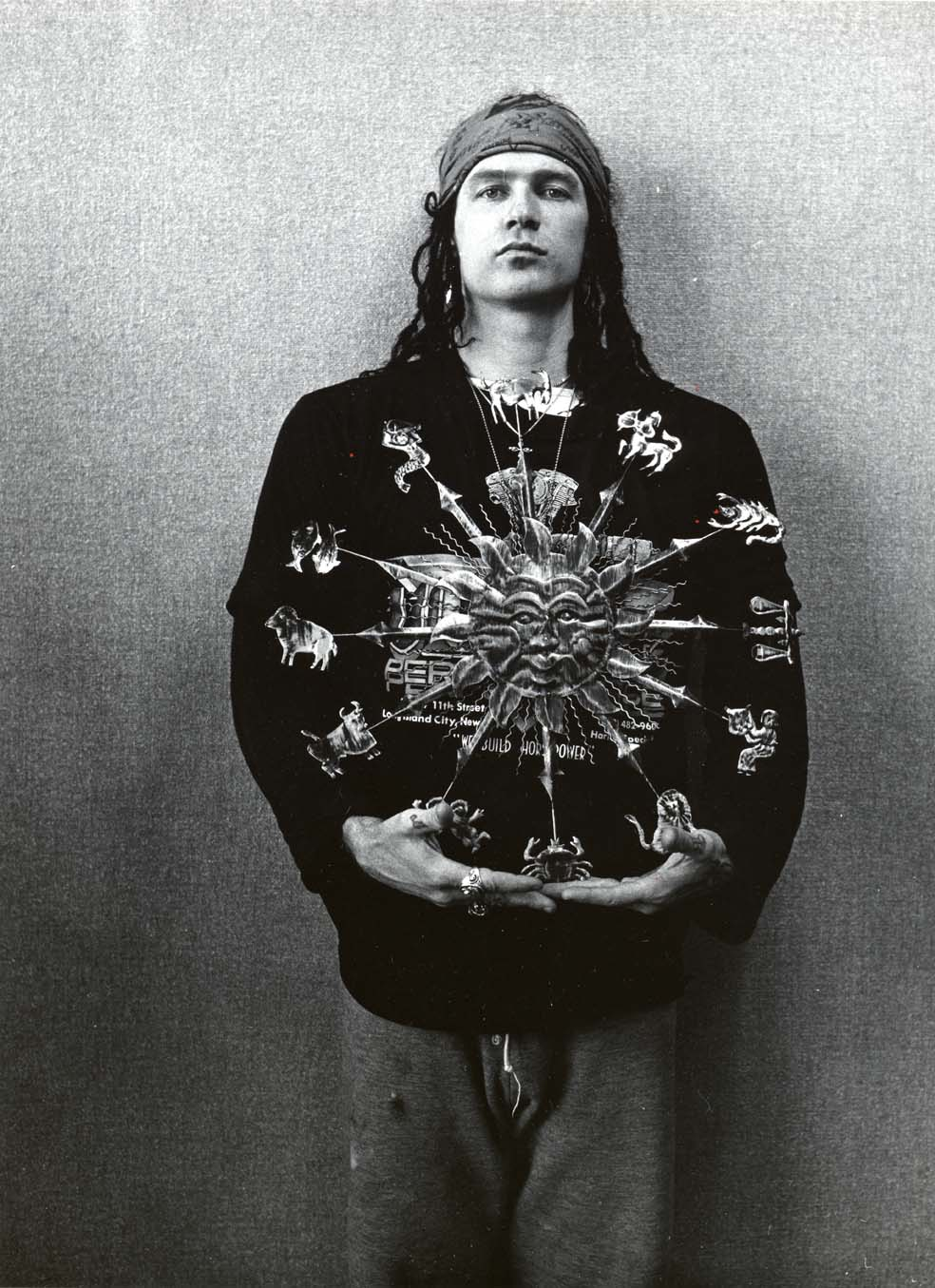
- Alex Mitchell with Circus of Power in Japan, 1989

Background information
- Origin: New York City, U.S.
- Genres: Hard rock; sleaze rock; heavy metal
- Years active: 1987–1995, 2014–present
- Labels: RCA, Columbia, Noize in the Attic
- Members: Alex Mitchell; Ricky Mahler; Ryan Maher; Joey Wrecked (Maya); Gary Sunshine; Marc Frappier; Victor Indrizzo; Zowie; Joe Truck; Joe Bondoc; Billy Tsounis; Scotty Slam

Circus of Power (CoP) is an American hard rock/sleaze rock band formed in New York City in 1987. They disbanded in 1995 and reformed in 2014. They have released four studio albums and three EPs.

Led by vocalist Alex Mitchell in all incarnations, Circus of Power had a sound similar to Alice in Chains, AC/DC, the Cult, D-A-D and Guns N' Roses, but with enough of their own distinctive and original style. Circus of Power had moderate success but some positive critical notice, especially in the UK's Kerrang! music magazine; which featured them on the front cover multiple times and awarded their first two albums five 'K's (the top rating for an album), each. Allmusic praised Mitchell's powerful vocal style as one of the band's strengths, but also said their "unremarkable songwriting" limited their success.

== 1987–1995: First incarnation ==
The group played clubs in New York for several years until they signed a contract with RCA Records. In July 1987, prior to the release of their debut album, Joey Wrecked quit the band and was replaced by Ryan Maher. The band released their debut album in 1988, to good reviews, and followed it up with another well received album in 1990. It was around this time that Gary Sunshine switched to guitar, and Zowie joined as bass guitarist.

On the back of these two albums and strong media support, Circus of Power was as the lone opening band for a complete tour of Black Sabbath in support of their 1990 album Tyr.

By 1991, like many hard rock/heavy metal bands of this period, CoP suffered when tastes changed in favor of the burgeoning grunge movement. However, the band persevered, recording and releasing their third album Magic and Madness in 1993. Two years later, they disbanded, ironically, just as grunge phenomenon was starting to die.

Lyrically and visually Circus of Power are heavily influenced by the biker scene and to this day, play at biker events and festivals.

Members have included vocalist Alex Mitchell, guitar players Ricky Mahler and Gary Sunshine, and drummer Ryan Maher. Of these, Mitchell is the only remaining founding member.

== Revivals ==
In 2006, Circus of Power played two 20th-anniversary shows. The first was in Austin, Texas at Elysium on June 3, during the Republic of Texas Biker Rally, and the second in New York City at Don Hill's on September 27. The NYC performance included Queen Vixen and Honey 1Percenter from Cycle Sluts from Hell on backing vocals, with Daniel Rey (Ramones) and Phil Caivano (Monster Magnet) as guest performers. It was their first New York performance in 12 years.

A 2007 interview indicated that singer Alex Mitchell planned to resurrect the band with a new album.

In 2008, Circus of Power was offered the opportunity to play two events, neither of which they could attend due to scheduling conflicts.

In December 2008, Mitchell informed fan site circusofpower.net that Rock Candy Records would issue a remastered release of Circus of Power's eponymous debut album. A reunion show was held on June 27, 2009, at the Knitting Factory in Los Angeles to promote the reissue and celebrate Club Vodka's seventh anniversary.

After some solo efforts and a few one-off reunion gigs, Mitchell added Fat Nancy and Captain Zapped to the lineup. In late 2014, they entered the studio to record fresh material. The new lineup shot a video for the song "Hard Drivin' Sister".

In 2016, the band recorded a new single and video, "American Monster", that featured Jyrki 69 of the 69 Eyes.

== Members ==
=== Current ===
- Alex Mitchell – vocals (1986–1995, 2014–present)
- Scotty Slam – drums (2016–present)
- Joe Bondoc – guitar (2016–present)
- Billy Tsounsis – guitar (2014–present)
- John Sharkey – bass (2014–present)
- Joe Truck – guitar (2014–2017, 2020–present)

=== Former ===
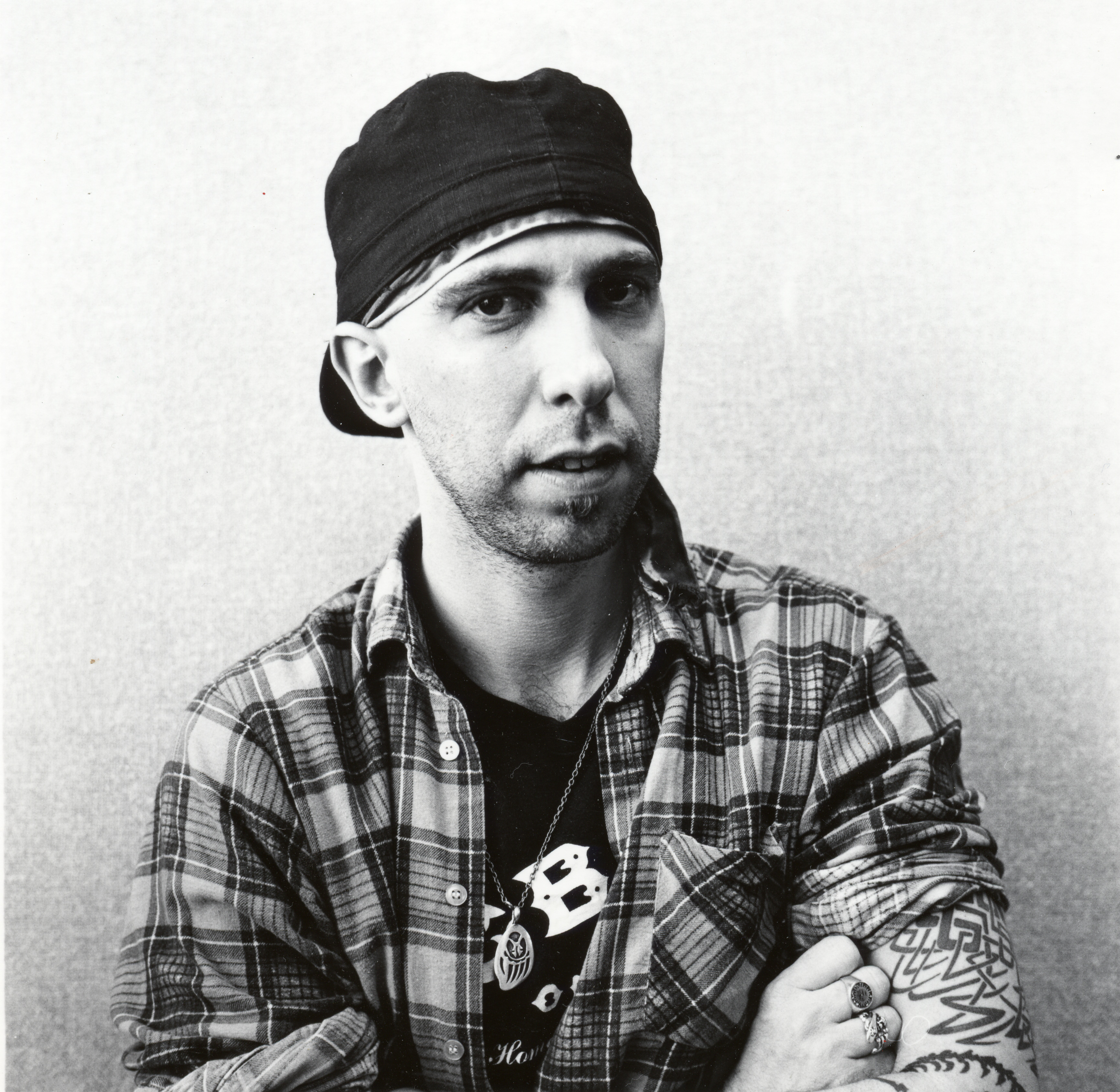
Gary Sunshine, 1989

- Joey Wrecked (Maya) – drums (1986–1987)
- Ricky Mahler – lead guitar (1986–1995)
- Gary Sunshine – bass/rhythm guitar (1986–1995)
- Ryan Maher – drums (1987–1991)
- Zowie Ackermann – bass (1990–1991)
- Marc Frappier – bass (1991–1995)
- Victor Indrizzo – drums (1991–1995)
- Tony Portillo – drums (2014–2015)
- JK Fortyseven – drums (2015–2016)
- Nao Nakashima – (2018–2019)

== Discography ==
=== Studio albums ===
Title	Details	Chart positions	Notes
Title	Details	US	Notes
Circus of Power	Released: 1988; Label: RCA Records	185	No. / Title / Length; 1. / "Motor"; 2. / "White Trash Queen"; 3. / "Call of the Wild"; 4. / "Needles"; 5. / "In the Wind"; 6. / "Heart Attack"; 7. / "Crazy"; 8. / "Letters Home"; 9. / "Backseat Mama"; 10. / "Machine"; 11. / "Turn Up The Jams"
Vices	Released: 1990; Label: RCA Records	—	No. / Title / Length; 1. / "Gates of Love"; 2. / "Desire/Fire in the Night"; 3. / "Two River Highway"; 4. / "Vices"; 5. / "Don't Drag Me Down"; 6. / "Last Call Rosie"; 7. / "Doctor Potion"; 8. / "Los Angeles"; 9. / "Got Hard..."; 10. / "Temptation"; 11. / "Junkie Girl"; 12. / "Simple Man/Simple Woman"
Magic & Madness	Released: 1993; Label: Columbia Records	—	No. / Title / Length; 1. / "Swamp Devil"; 2. / "Evil Woman"; 3. / "Heaven & Hell"; 4. / "Circles"; 5. / "Poison Girl"; 6. / "Shine"; 7. / "Dreams Tonight"; 8. / "Mama Tequila"; 9. / "Black Roses"; 10. / "Waitin' for the Wizard"; 11. / "Outta My Head"; 12. / "Slip Away"
Four	Released: December 8, 2017; Label: Noize in the Attic	—	No. / Title / Length; 1. / "Fast and Easy"; 2. / "Hard Drivin' Sister"; 3. / "Rock Show"; 4. / "Princess of Mars"; 5. / "Half a Dozen Roses"; 6. / "Sin City Boogie"; 7. / "American Monster"; 8. / "See the Sun"; 9. / "Flying Into L.A."; 10. / "Hot Rod Girls"; 11. / "Love Sick Blues"; 12. / "The Tea Song"; 13. / "Blood at Standing Rock"; 14. / "Come Git Some"

=== EPs and live albums ===
Title	Details	Chart positions	Notes
Title	Details	US	Notes
Still Alive	Released: 1989; Label: Metal Blade Records, Restless Records	—	No. / Title / Length; 1. / "Still Alive and Well"; 2. / "Motor"; 3. / "Letters Home"; 4. / "White Trash Queen"; 5. / "Heart Attack"; 6. / "Turn Up the Jams"
Live at the Ritz	Released: 1991; Label: RCA	—	No. / Title / Length; 1. / "Gates of Love"; 2. / "Call of the Wild"; 3. / "Los Angeles"; 4. / "Vices"; 5. / "How Many More Times"
The Process of Illumination	Released: 2020; Label: Noize In The Attic	—	No. / Title / Length; 1. / "Strange Times"; 2. / "Love Machine"; 3. / "I Liked It Better When You Got Stoned"; 4. / "Child Of Mother Earth"; 5. / "Mister Politician Man"; 6. / "Save The American Wolf"

== In popular culture ==
- "Machine", from the band's 1988 self-titled debut album, was featured in the comedy film The 'Burbs the following year.
- The band performed "Call of the Wild" and "Letter Home" – which featured Ace Frehley of Kiss on lead guitar – at the end of a 1989 episode of The Morton Downey Jr. Show concerning heavy metal.
- In the Beavis and Butt-Head episode "Eating Contest", the two watch the music video for "Heaven or Hell". Beavis mistakes the band for Alice in Chains, to which Butt-Head responds that they are not that band yet they sound like them.
