= A Job to Do =

2017 song by Jerry Cantrell

Song by Jerry Cantrell

from the album John Wick: Chapter 2 (Original Motion Picture Soundtrack)
- Released: February 9, 2017
- Recorded: November 8, 2015 – January 21, 2016
- Studio: Igloo Music Studios, Burbank, California
- Length: 4:50
- Label: Varèse Sarabande
- Composer(s): Jerry Cantrell; Tyler Bates
- Lyricist(s): Jerry Cantrell
- Producer(s): Jerry Cantrell; Tyler Bates

"A Job to Do" is a song by American rock musician Jerry Cantrell, written for the end credits of the 2017 film John Wick: Chapter 2. The song premiered on Billboard's website on February 9, 2017, and was featured on John Wick: Chapter 2 (Original Motion Picture Soundtrack) as the last track on the album. A lyric video featuring Cantrell and Keanu Reeves was released on YouTube on March 21, 2017.

"A Job to Do" marks the first time Cantrell released a solo song since 2002. The song was first played live on December 6, 2019, at Cantrell's solo concert at the Pico Union Project in Los Angeles.

== Origin and recording ==
The song was recorded at Igloo Music Studios in Burbank, California between November 8, 2015, and January 21, 2016.

Jerry Cantrell wrote the lyrics from the perspective of Keanu Reeves' title character in John Wick: Chapter 2. Cantrell told Billboard about the song:

I moved houses a few years ago and ended up meeting my new neighbor, Tyler. He did the first [John Wick] movie and a song with Marilyn Manson, ['Killing Strangers'] that I thought really fit the film. He mentioned there was going to be a sequel and maybe we could work it out. Writing specifically for a movie was kind of fun. It almost felt like an assignment that I gave to myself. It's not unlike how I normally write from a personal point of view, whether mine or someone else's.

== Release ==
"A Job to Do" premiered on Billboard's website on February 9, 2017, a day before the soundtrack was released.

A lyric video featuring Jerry Cantrell and Keanu Reeves was released on YouTube on March 21, 2017.

== Live performances ==
The song was performed live for the first time during Jerry Cantrell's solo concert at the Pico Union Project in Los Angeles on December 6, 2019. Cantrell was accompanied by Tyler Bates on guitar and Gil Sharone on drums, both musicians who performed in the original recording.

== Personnel ==
- Jerry Cantrell – vocals, acoustic and electric guitar
- Tyler Bates – bass
- Gil Sharone – drums

Production

- Produced by Jerry Cantrell, Tyler Bates
- Engineered by Paul Figueroa
- Published by Boggy Bottom Publishing
