= Little Immaculate White Fox =

Studio album by Pearl
- Released: January 19, 2010
- Genre: Hard rock
- Length: 43:51
- Label: Megaforce Records
- Producer: Joe Barresi

Little Immaculate White Fox is the debut album of American rock singer Pearl Aday, released in January 2010 on Megaforce Records. The album deviates from the style of Pearl's father Meat Loaf's operatic rock, and leans more towards classic rock sound with a strong resemblance to the music of Janis Joplin. The opening track, "Rock Child", is an autobiographical piece where Pearl sings of how she used to nap in a guitar case as a child while her father was recording in the studio.

== Track listing ==
No.	Title	Lyrics	Music	Length
1.	"Rock Child"	Pearl Aday	Jim Wilson, Marcus Blake	4:19
2.	"Broken White"	Pearl Aday	Jim Wilson, Marcus Blake, Carl Colt, Scott Ian	4:35
3.	"Nutbush City Limits"	Tina Turner	Tina Turner	3:32
4.	"Check Out Charlie" (featuring Ted Nugent)	Pearl Aday	Jim Wilson, Marcus Blake	3:21
5.	"Mama"	Pearl Aday	Jim Wilson, Marcus Blake	4:08
6.	"My Heart Isn't In It"	Pearl Aday	Jim Wilson, Marcus Blake	5:02
7.	"Nobody"	Pearl Aday	Jim Wilson, Marcus Blake, Scott Ian	5:01
8.	"Worth Defending"	Pearl Aday	Jim Wilson, Marcus Blake	4:17
9.	"Lovepyre"	Pearl Aday	Jim Wilson, Marcus Blake	2:58
10.	"Whore"	Mother Superior	Mother Superior	2:41
11.	"Anything" (featuring Jerry Cantrell)	Carl Colt, Pearl Aday	Carl Colt	4:31

== Reception ==
Antimusic.com called the album "an epic blend of hard rock, blues and soul, connected by Pearl's distinct and empowering vocals." and "100% pure and infectious." Australian magazine Loud praised it as "one smoking hot rock album." Ruben Mosqueda for Sleaze Roxx said that "Pearl rocks, and rocks hard!" lamenting that these albums don't sell as well as they used to. Hip Online said that it "takes you on a rock and roll journey." And in his review of the album, Randy Patterson said, "We're going to be hearing a lot from here for a very long time."
