= Gil Sharone =

American drummer

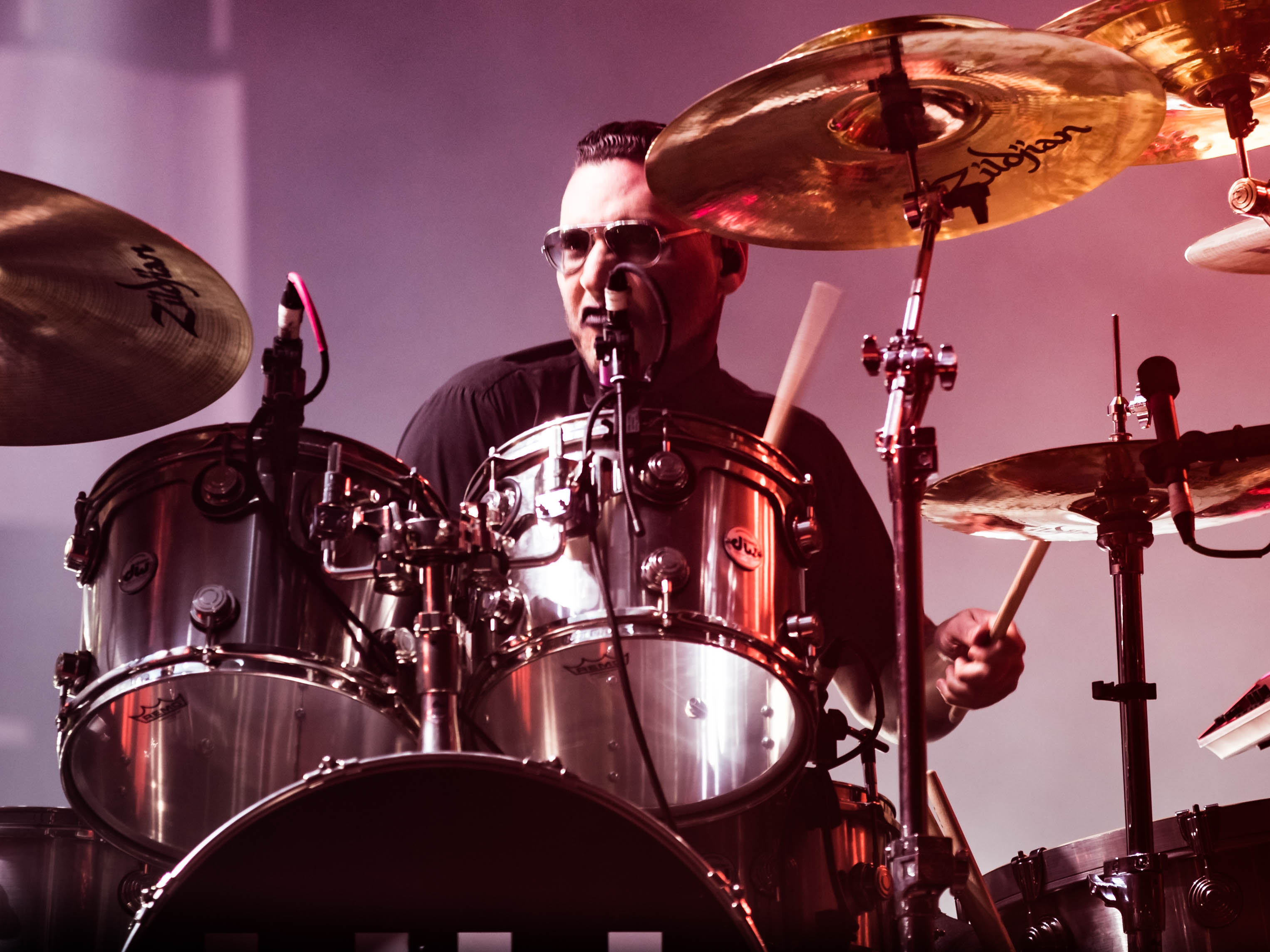
- Sharone with Marilyn Manson in 2018

Background information
- Born: June 2, 1978 (age 48); Los Angeles, California, U.S.
- Genres: Avant-garde metal; reggae; ska; funk; jazz; mathcore; alternative rock; punk rock; industrial metal; hip hop
- Occupations: Drummer
- Member of: Stolen Babies, Marilyn Manson, Team Sleep
- Formerly of: The Dillinger Escape Plan

Gil Sharone (born June 2, 1978) is an American drummer and member of the rock bands Stolen Babies, Team Sleep, Marilyn Manson and formerly The Dillinger Escape Plan. He was also a fill in for the punk rock supergroup +44. He is the twin brother of Rani Sharone, also of Stolen Babies.

Sharone is highly regarded as one of the most versatile touring/session drummers in the world, due to his work on classic-styled ska, rocksteady and reggae, while also working in punk rock and industrial metal.

== Career ==
Sharone supported Mark Hoppus's band +44 when Travis Barker broke his arm. Gil toured around Europe, Japan and Australia with +44 in early 2007. It is believed he learned all of +44's setlist on the flight from America to Europe. He played on Travis's custom made, transparent green, OCDP drum kit. He started using Drum Workshop drums and hardware in October 2011.

Sharone also recorded the drum tracks on the third Dillinger Escape Plan record Ire Works, and joined the band during all of their tour dates in 2008 (he played the European tour in early 2008 both with Dillinger and also as support with Stolen Babies). Gil also performed on Puscifer's V Is for Vagina album.

In January 2009, it was announced that Sharone had parted ways with Dillinger Escape Plan, due to his focus on Stolen Babies and other personal projects including his DVD, Wicked Beats, based on the drumming styles of ska, rocksteady and reggae. Wicked Beats was released through Hudson Music late 2010.

Sharone played Teenage Alex on an episode of Full House along with his twin brother, who played Teenage Nicky.

In November 2013, Sharone joined Marilyn Manson and performed on their ninth studio album, The Pale Emperor, released in 2015. Sharone worked on the follow-up album, Heaven Upside Down, released in 2017. In March 2019, Sharone announced that he was quitting the band. Sharone returned to the band in 2024 and performed on their twelfth studio album One Assassination Under God – Chapter 1.

Sharone was featured on reggae Grammy winners Morgan Heritage track "So Amazing" on the album Strictly Roots (2016). He performs on the film scores to "John Wick," "John Wick 2," "Slackers" and the TV shows, "Salem," "Kingdom," and the Netflix series "The Punisher (2017)".

On December 6 and 7, 2019, Sharone joined his former bandmate Greg Puciato and Jerry Cantrell of Alice In Chains for two sold-out concerts in Los Angeles, performing songs from Cantrell's solo career as well as Alice In Chains. These were Cantrell's first solo concerts since 2004.

In 2021, Sharone played drums on Jerry Cantrell's albums Brighten and I Want Blood.
