= Blackdiamondskye =

2010 concert tour by Alice in Chains, Deftones and Mastodon

- Tour by Alice in Chains, Deftones and Mastodon
- Promotional poster for the concert in Morrison, Colorado
- Location: North America
- Start date: September 16, 2010
- End date: October 16, 2010
- Legs: 1
- No. of shows: 19

Blackdiamondskye was a 2010 North American concert tour headlined by American rock band Alice in Chains featuring special guests Deftones and Mastodon. Blackdiamondskye is a portmanteau of the three band's then-most recent albums: Alice in Chains' Black Gives Way to Blue (2009), Deftones' Diamond Eyes (2010), and Mastodon's Crack the Skye (2009). The tour began on September 16, 2010 in Chicago and concluded on October 16, 2010 in Las Vegas.

== History ==
The tour was officially announced on April 29, 2010, after a series of cryptic videos were posted on YouTube and a countdown was posted on the recently launched blackdiamondskye.com site a week prior to the announcement. Manager David Benveniste from Velvet Hammer Music and Management Group said about the strategy, "Rather than launch with a traditional tour announcement, we wanted to engage the fans first. We gave them a cryptic clip featuring video snippets of each band and they lit up the internet. Now there's an entire online community talking about the tour and speculating about the bands involved. It's thrilling to see them communicate and respond so positively to this exciting tour." More dates were announced on June 14, 2010.

On August 31, 2010, MTV launched a contest asking the fans of Alice in Chains to create a custom trailer for the tour. The winning submissions were chosen by the band and the grand prize winner received a personalized Black Gives Way To Blue gold record, VIP tickets to any date on the tour, a meet-and-greet with the band and an autographed poster.

The tour kicked off on September 16 in Chicago and wrapped up on October 16 in Paradise, Nevada. The tour lasted for 19 shows over the course of one month and featured shows at both outdoor arena and amphitheatres and indoor venues.

Alice in Chains' concert at the KeyArena in Seattle on October 8, 2010 was filmed in 3D for a future release. The concert was helmed by director Tim Cronenweth and director of photography Jeff Cronenweth.

The basic riff for the Alice in Chains' song "Hollow" came to Jerry Cantrell while he was in his dressing room in Las Vegas warming up for the last concert of the tour. He started playing the riff and recorded it to use it later. Producer Nick Raskulinecz and Cantrell's managers were at that show and praised the riff when they heard Cantrell playing it. The song was featured on the band's fifth studio album, The Devil Put Dinosaurs Here, released in May 2013.

== Tour dates ==
Date	City	Country	Venue
September 16, 2010	Chicago	United States	Charter One Pavilion
September 17, 2010	Clarkston	United States	DTE Energy Music Theatre
September 18, 2010	Toronto	Canada	Molson Amphitheatre
September 20, 2010	Uncasville	United States	Mohegan Sun Arena
September 22, 2010	Boston	United States	Agganis Arena
September 24, 2010	New York City	United States	Madison Square Garden
September 25, 2010	Camden	United States	Susquehanna Bank Center
September 26, 2010	Fairfax	United States	Patriot Center
September 28, 2010	Atlanta	United States	Lakewood Amphitheatre
October 1, 2010	St. Louis	United States	Scottrade Center
October 2, 2010	Bonner Springs	United States	Sandstone Amphitheater
October 4, 2010	Morrison	United States	Red Rocks Amphitheatre
October 7, 2010	Vancouver	Canada	Rogers Arena
October 8, 2010	Seattle	United States	KeyArena
October 9, 2010	Portland	United States	Memorial Coliseum
October 11, 2010	San Jose	United States	SJSU Events Center
October 12, 2010	Los Angeles	United States	Gibson Amphitheatre
October 15, 2010	San Diego	United States	Viejas Arena
October 16, 2010	Paradise	United States	The Joint

== Setlist ==
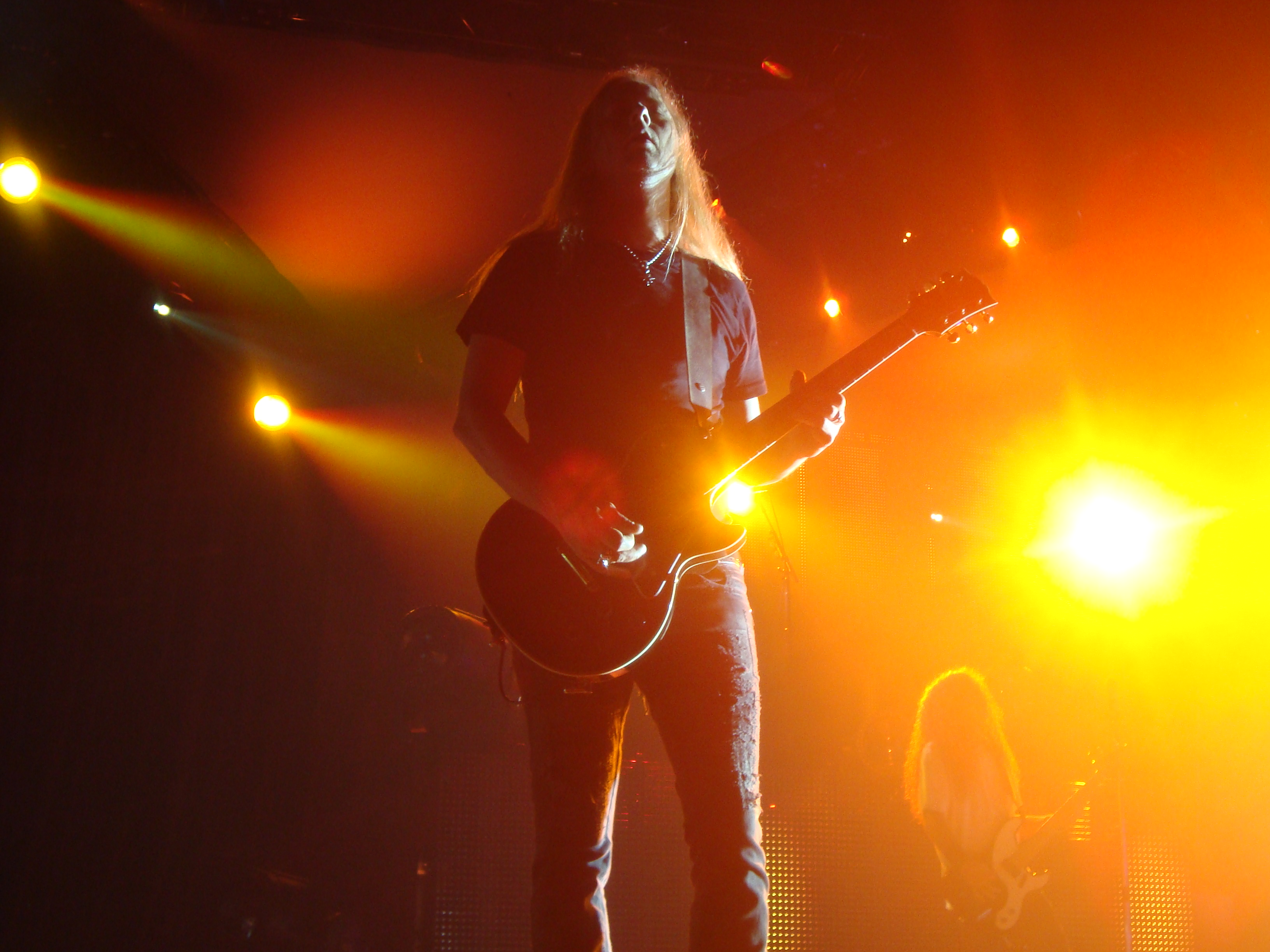
Jerry Cantrell playing guitar during a concert in San Jose on October 11, 2010.

Alice in Chains Setlist

1. "Again"
2. "Check My Brain"
3. "Dam That River"
4. "Lesson Learned"
5. "Man in the Box"
6. "No Excuses"
7. "Rain When I Die"
8. "Rooster"
9. "Them Bones"
10. "We Die Young"
11. "Would?"
12. "Your Decision"
13. "Grind"
14. "Acid Bubble"
15. "It Ain't Like That"
16. "Junkhead"
17. "Nutshell"
18. "Last of My Kind"
19. "Love, Hate, Love"
20. "A Looking in View"
21. "Angry Chair"
22. "Down in a Hole"
23. "God Am"
24. "Got Me Wrong"
25. "Black Gives Way to Blue"
26. "Rotten Apple"
27. "Sludge Factory"
28. "Sickman"

Deftones Setlist

1. "Around the Fur"
2. "Change (In the House of Flies)"
3. "Diamond Eyes"
4. "My Own Summer (Shove It)"
5. "Rocket Skates"
6. "Sextape"
7. "You've Seen the Butcher"
8. "7 Words"
9. "Engine No. 9"
10. "Be Quiet and Drive (Far Away)"
11. "Passenger"
12. "Nosebleed"
13. "Birthmark"
14. "Prince"
15. "Risk"
16. "Beauty School"
17. "Headup"

Mastodon Setlist

1. "Colony of Birchmen"
2. "Crystal Skull"
3. "Divinations"
4. "Megalodon"
5. "Naked Burn"
6. "Blood and Thunder"
7. "The Czar"
8. "Oblivion"
9. "Capillarian Crest"
10. "Aqua Dementia"
11. "Circle of Cysquatch"
12. "Iron Tusk"
13. "March of the Fire Ants"
14. "Sleeping Giant"
15. "I Am Ahab"
16. "Seabeast"

== Personnel ==
Alice in Chains

- Jerry Cantrell – vocals, lead guitar
- William DuVall – vocals, rhythm guitar
- Mike Inez – bass
- Sean Kinney – drums

Deftones

- Chino Moreno – vocals, rhythm guitar
- Stephen Carpenter – lead guitar
- Sergio Vega – bass
- Frank Delgado – keyboards, samplers, turntables
- Abe Cunningham – drums

Mastodon

- Brent Hinds – vocals, lead guitar
- Bill Kelliher – rhythm guitar
- Troy Sanders – bass
- Brann Dailor – vocals, drums
