= List of awards and nominations received by Alice in Chains =

Alice in Chains awards and nominations
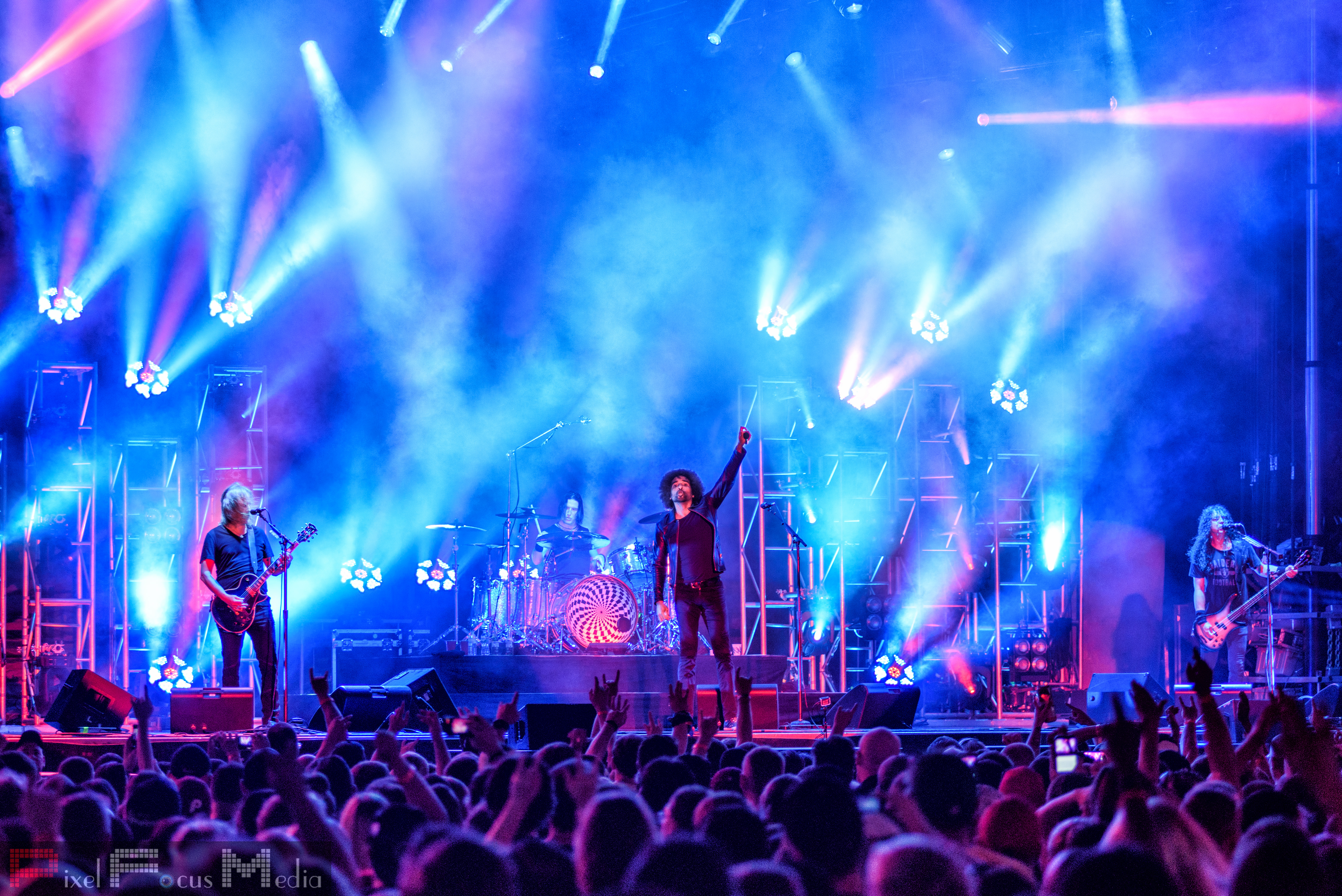
- Alice in Chains in concert in 2016
Awards and nominations
Award	Wins	Nominations
American Music Awards	0	1
Billboard Music Awards	0	1
Grammy Awards	0	11
MTV Video Music Awards	1	3
MTV Movie Awards	0	1
Juno Awards	0	1
Concrete Foundations Awards	1	1
SPIN's Readers' Poll Awards	1	1
Revolver Golden Gods Awards	2	4
Metal Hammer Golden Gods Awards	1	1
Kerrang! Awards	2	2
Loudwire Music Awards	0	5
Northwest Area Music Awards	2	10
Metal Storm Awards	2	4
Fryderyk Awards	1	1

Totals (Note: Certain award groups do not simply award one winner. They acknowledge several different recipients, have runners-up, and have third place. Since this is a specific recognition and is different from losing an award, runner-up mentions are considered wins in this award tally. For simplification and to avoid errors, each award in this list has been presumed to have had a prior nomination.)
- Wins: 13
- Nominations: 50

This is a list of awards and nominations earned by American rock band Alice in Chains.

As of 2019, Alice in Chains has received eleven Grammy nominations. Their first nomination was for the song "Man in the Box", nominated for Best Hard Rock Performance in 1992. The album Dirt was nominated in the same category in 1993. Six more songs were nominated between 1995 and 2011. The album Jar of Flies was nominated for Best Recording Package in 1995. The Devil Put Dinosaurs Here was nominated for Best Engineered Album, Non Classical in 2014, and the album Rainier Fog was nominated for Best Rock Album in 2019.

The music video for the song "Would?", Alice in Chains' contribution to the 1992 film Singles, won the award for Best Video from a Film at the 1993 MTV Video Music Awards. In 2009 they won the Kerrang! Icon award, and in 2010 they won two Revolver Golden Gods awards for Black Gives Way to Blue.

== American Music Awards ==
The American Music Awards is an annual awards ceremony created by Dick Clark in 1973.

Year	Nominee / work	Award	Result	Ref.
1992	Alice in Chains	Favorite New Heavy Metal/Hard Rock Artist	Nominated	

== Billboard Music Awards ==
The Billboard Music Awards is an annual awards ceremony held by Billboard magazine.

Year	Nominee / work	Award	Result	Ref.
1994	"No Excuses"	Top Rock Song	Nominated	

== Concrete Foundations Awards ==
The Concrete Foundations Awards was an awards ceremony held by the Foundations Forum to recognize the significant contributions made by key artists to the heavy metal genre and the music industry as a whole.

Year	Nominee / work	Award	Result	Ref.
1991	Facelift	Best Debut Album	Won	

== Fryderyk Awards ==
The Fryderyk Awards is an annual awards ceremony held by the Polish Society of the Phonographic Industry.

Year	Nominee / work	Award	Result	Ref.
2010	Black Gives Way to Blue	Best Foreign Album	Won	

== GAFFA Awards ==
=== Denmark GAFFA Awards ===
The GAFFA Awards is an annual awards ceremony established in 1991 by the Danish magazine of the same name.

Year	Nominee / work	Award	Result	Ref.
1993	Alice in Chains	Best Band	Nominated	
1993	Alice in Chains	Best Concert	Nominated	

=== Sweden GAFFA Awards ===
The GAFFA Awards (Swedish: GAFFA Priset) are awarded by the Swedish magazine of the same name since 2010.

Year	Nominee / work	Award	Result	Ref.
2019	Alice in Chains	Best Foreign Band	Nominated	

== Grammy Awards ==
The Grammy Awards are awarded annually by the National Academy of Recording Arts and Sciences.

Year	Nominee / work	Award	Result	Ref.
1992	"Man in the Box"	Best Hard Rock Performance With Vocal	Nominated	
1993	Dirt	Best Hard Rock Performance With Vocal	Nominated	
1995	Jar of Flies	Best Recording Package	Nominated	
1995	"I Stay Away"	Best Hard Rock Performance	Nominated	
1996	"Grind"	Best Hard Rock Performance	Nominated	
1997	"Again"	Best Hard Rock Performance	Nominated	
2000	"Get Born Again"	Best Hard Rock Performance	Nominated	
2010	"Check My Brain"	Best Hard Rock Performance	Nominated	
2011	"A Looking in View"	Best Hard Rock Performance	Nominated	
2014	The Devil Put Dinosaurs Here	Best Engineered Album, Non Classical	Nominated	
2019	Rainier Fog	Best Rock Album	Nominated	

== Juno Awards ==
The Juno Awards are presented by the Canadian Academy of Recording Arts and Sciences.

Year	Nominee / work	Award	Result	Ref.
2014	Randy Staub (for "Hollow")	Juno Award for Recording Engineer of the Year	Nominated	

== Kerrang! Awards ==
The Kerrang! Awards is an annual awards ceremony held by Kerrang!, a British rock magazine.

Year	Nominee / work	Award	Result	Ref.
1996	Alice in Chains	Classic Songwriter Award	Won	
2009	Alice in Chains	Icon Award	Won	

== Loudwire Music Awards ==
The Loudwire Music Awards is an annual awards ceremony held by Loudwire, an American music website.

Year	Nominee / work	Award	Result	Ref.
2014	Alice in Chains	Rock Band of the Year	Nominated	
2014	The Devil Put Dinosaurs Here	Rock Album of the Year	Nominated	
2014	Jerry Cantrell	Guitarist of the Year	Nominated	
2014	"Hollow"	Rock Song of the Year	Nominated	
2014	"Hollow"	Rock Video of the Year	Nominated	

== Metal Hammer Golden Gods Awards ==
The Metal Hammer Golden Gods Awards is an annual awards ceremony held by Metal Hammer, a British heavy metal magazine.

Year	Nominee / work	Award	Result	Ref.
2013	Alice in Chains	Icon Award	Won	

== Metal Storm Awards ==
The Metal Storm Awards is an annual awards held by Metal Storm, an Estonian heavy metal magazine.

Year	Nominee / work	Award	Result	Ref.
2009	Black Gives Way to Blue	Best Alternative Metal Album	Nominated	
2009	Black Gives Way to Blue	Biggest Surprise	Nominated	
2013	The Devil Put Dinosaurs Here	Best Alternative Metal Album	Nominated	
2018	Rainier Fog	Best Alternative Metal Album	Won	

== MoPOP Founders Award ==
The MoPOP Founders Award is an annual awards ceremony held by the Museum of Pop Culture in Seattle.

Year	Nominee / work	Award	Result	Ref.
2020	Alice in Chains	Founders Award	Won	

== MTV Movie Awards ==
The MTV Movie Awards is an annual awards ceremony established in 1992 by MTV.

Year	Nominee / work	Award	Result	Ref.
1993	"Would?" from Singles	Best Song from a Movie	Nominated	

== MTV Video Music Awards ==
The MTV Video Music Awards is an annual awards ceremony established in 1984 by MTV.

Year	Nominee / work	Award	Result	Ref.
1991	"Man in the Box"	Best Heavy Metal/Hard Rock Video	Nominated	
1993	"Would?" from Singles	Best Video from a Film	Won	
1996	"Again"	Best Hard Rock Video	Nominated	

== Northwest Area Music Awards ==
The Northwest Area Music Awards (NAMA) was an awards ceremony held by the Northwest Area Music Association. Alice in Chains received nine nominations in 1991 and won one award. The other eight nominations are unknown.

Year	Nominee / work	Award	Result	Ref.
1991	Facelift	Best Recording	Won	
1992	Alice in Chains	Best Rock Group	Won	

== Revolver Golden Gods Awards ==
The Revolver Golden Gods Awards is an annual awards ceremony held by Revolver, an American hard-rock and heavy metal magazine.

Year	Nominee / work	Award	Result	Ref.
2010	Black Gives Way to Blue	Album of the Year	Won	
2010	Alice in Chains	Comeback of the Year	Won	
2014	"Hollow"	Song of the Year	Nominated	
2014	Jerry Cantrell	Dimebag Darrell Best Guitarist(s) Award	Nominated	

== SPIN Readers' Poll Awards ==
The SPIN Readers' Poll is an awards held annually by American music magazine SPIN.

Year	Nominee / work	Award	Result	Ref.
1993	Dirt	Best Album	Won	

== See also ==
- List of awards and nominations received by Jerry Cantrell
