= List of awards and nominations received by Jerry Cantrell =

Jerry Cantrell awards and nominations
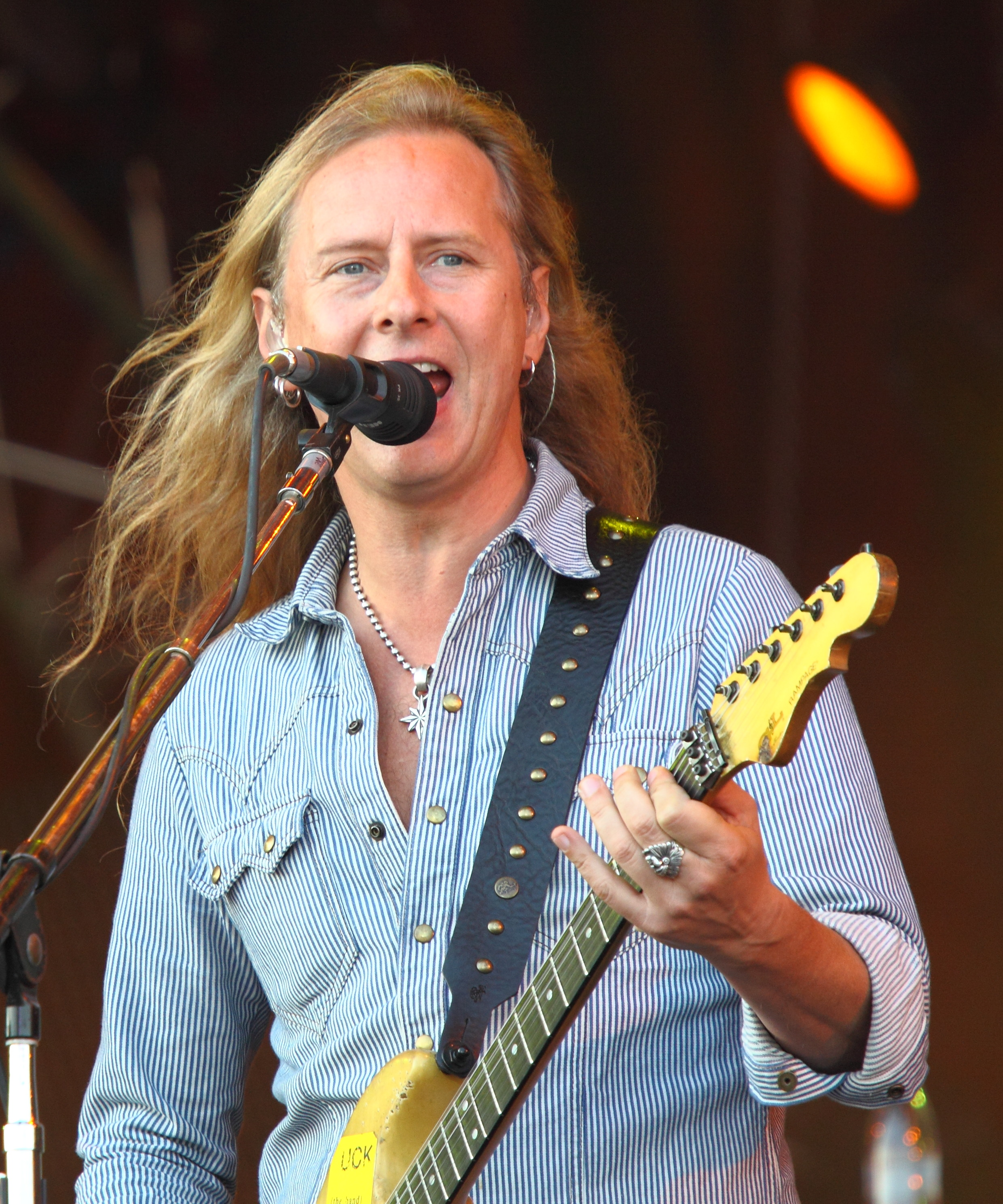
- Cantrell at the Roskilde Festival in 2010
Awards and nominations
Award	Wins	Nominations
American Music Awards	0	1
Grammy	0	9
MTV VMA	1	3
Billboard Music Awards	0	1
Kerrang! Awards	2	2
Metal Hammer Golden Gods Awards	2	2
Revolver Golden Gods Awards	2	4

Totals (Note: Certain award groups do not simply award one winner. They acknowledge several different recipients, have runners-up, and have third place. Since this is a specific recognition and is different from losing an award, runner-up mentions are considered wins in this award tally. For simplification and to avoid errors, each award in this list has been presumed to have had a prior nomination.)
- Wins: 17
- Nominations: 50

The following is a list of awards and nominations received by American rock musician Jerry Cantrell throughout his career.

== American Music Awards ==
The American Music Awards is an annual awards ceremony created by Dick Clark in 1973.

Year	Nominee / work	Award	Result	Ref.
1992	Alice in Chains	Favorite New Heavy Metal/Hard Rock Artist	Nominated	

== Billboard Music Awards ==
The Billboard Music Awards is an annual awards ceremony held by Billboard magazine.

Year	Nominee / work	Award	Result	Ref.
1994	"No Excuses" (Alice in Chains)	Top Rock Song	Nominated	

== Billboard Music Video Awards ==
Year	Nominee / work	Award	Result	Ref.
1998	Cut You In (Jerry Cantrell)	Best Hard Rock/Metal Clip	Nominated	
1998	Cut You In (Jerry Cantrell)	Best New Hard Rock/Metal Artist Clip	Nominated	

== Concrete Foundations Awards ==
The Concrete Foundations Awards was an awards ceremony held by the Foundations Forum to recognize the significant contributions made by key artists to the heavy metal genre and the music industry as a whole.

Year	Nominee / work	Award	Result	Ref.
1991	Facelift (Alice in Chains)	Best Debut Album	Won	

== Fryderyk Awards ==
The Fryderyk Awards is an annual awards ceremony held by the Polish Society of the Phonographic Industry.

Year	Nominee / work	Award	Result	Ref.
2010	Black Gives Way to Blue (Alice in Chains)	Best Foreign Album	Won	

== Grammy Awards ==
The Grammy Awards are awarded annually by the National Academy of Recording Arts and Sciences.

Year	Nominee / work	Award	Result	Ref.
1992	"Man in the Box" (Alice in Chains)	Best Hard Rock Performance With Vocal	Nominated	
1993	Dirt (Alice in Chains)	Best Hard Rock Performance With Vocal	Nominated	
1995	"I Stay Away" (Alice in Chains)	Best Hard Rock Performance	Nominated	
1996	"Grind" (Alice in Chains)	Best Hard Rock Performance	Nominated	
1997	"Again" (Alice in Chains)	Best Hard Rock Performance	Nominated	
2000	"Get Born Again" (Alice in Chains)	Best Hard Rock Performance	Nominated	
2010	"Check My Brain" (Alice in Chains)	Best Hard Rock Performance	Nominated	
2011	"A Looking in View" (Alice in Chains)	Best Hard Rock Performance	Nominated	
2019	Rainier Fog (Alice in Chains)	Best Rock Album	Nominated	

== Kerrang! Awards ==
The Kerrang! Awards is an annual awards ceremony held by Kerrang!, a British rock magazine.

Year	Nominee / work	Award	Result	Ref.
1996	Alice in Chains	Classic Songwriter Award	Won	
2009	Alice in Chains	Icon Award	Won	

== Loudwire Music Awards ==
The Loudwire Music Awards is an annual awards ceremony held by Loudwire, an American music website.

Year	Nominee / work	Award	Result	Ref.
2014	Alice in Chains	Rock Band of the Year	Nominated	
2014	The Devil Put Dinosaurs Here	Rock Album of the Year	Nominated	
2014	Jerry Cantrell	Guitarist of the Year	Nominated	
2014	"Hollow" (Alice in Chains)	Rock Song of the Year	Nominated	
2014	"Hollow" (Alice in Chains)	Rock Video of the Year	Nominated	

== Metal Hammer Golden Gods Awards ==
The Metal Hammer Golden Gods Awards is an annual awards ceremony held by Metal Hammer, a British heavy metal magazine.

Year	Nominee / work	Award	Result	Ref.
2006	Jerry Cantrell	Riff Lord Award	Won	
2013	Alice in Chains	Icon Award	Won	

== Metal Storm Awards ==
The Metal Storm Awards is an annual awards held by Metal Storm, an Estonian heavy metal magazine.

Year	Nominee / work	Award	Result	Ref.
2009	Black Gives Way to Blue (Alice in Chains)	Best Alternative Metal Album	Won	
2009	Black Gives Way to Blue (Alice in Chains)	Biggest Surprise	Nominated	
2013	The Devil Put Dinosaurs Here (Alice in Chains)	Best Alternative Metal Album	Nominated	
2018	Rainier Fog (Alice in Chains)	Best Alternative Metal Album	Won	

== MoPOP's Founders Award ==
The MoPOP's Founders Award is an annual awards ceremony held by the Museum of Pop Culture in Seattle.

Year	Nominee / work	Award	Result	Ref.
2020	Alice in Chains	Founders Award	Won	

== MTV Movie Awards ==
The MTV Movie Awards is an annual awards ceremony established in 1992 by MTV.

Year	Nominee / work	Award	Result	Ref.
1993	"Would?" from Singles	Best Song from a Movie	Nominated	

== MTV Video Music Awards ==
The MTV Video Music Awards is an annual awards ceremony established in 1984 by MTV.

Year	Nominee / work	Award	Result	Ref.
1991	"Man in the Box"	Best Heavy Metal/Hard Rock Video	Nominated	
1993	"Would?" from Singles	Best Video from a Film	Won	
1996	"Again"	Best Hard Rock Video	Nominated	

== MusiCares MAP Fund Awards ==
The Stevie Ray Vaughan Award is given annually by the MusiCares MAP Fund honoring musicians for their devotion to helping other addicts struggling with the recovery process.

Year	Nominee / work	Award	Result	Ref.
2012	Jerry Cantrell	Stevie Ray Vaughan Award	Won	

== Northwest Area Music Awards ==
The Northwest Area Music Awards (NAMA) was an awards ceremony held by the Northwest Area Music Association. Alice in Chains received nine nominations in 1991 and won one award. The other eight nominations are unknown.

Year	Nominee / work	Award	Result	Ref.
1991	Facelift (Alice in Chains)	Best Recording	Won	
1992	Alice in Chains	Best Rock Group	Won	

== Revolver Golden Gods Awards ==
The Revolver Golden Gods Awards is an annual awards ceremony held by Revolver, an American hard-rock and heavy metal magazine.

Year	Nominee / work	Award	Result	Ref.
2010	Black Gives Way to Blue (Alice in Chains)	Album of the Year	Won	
2010	Alice in Chains	Comeback of the Year	Won	
2014	"Hollow" (Alice in Chains)	Song of the Year	Nominated	
2014	Jerry Cantrell	Dimebag Darrell Best Guitarist(s) Award	Nominated	

== SPIN Magazine Readers' Poll ==
The SPIN Magazine Readers' Poll is an award held annually by American music magazine SPIN.

Year	Nominee / work	Award	Result	Ref.
1993	Dirt (Alice in Chains)	Best Album	Won	

== Total Guitar's Readers' Poll ==
The Total Guitar's Readers' Poll is an award held annually by British music magazine Total Guitar.

Year	Nominee / work	Award	Result	Ref.
2021	Jerry Cantrell	Guitarist of the Year	Nominated	

== Ultimate Guitar's Readers' Poll ==
The Ultimate Guitar's Readers' Poll is an award held annually by American music website Ultimate Guitar.

Year	Nominee / work	Award	Result	Ref.
2018	Jerry Cantrell	Guitarist of the Year	Won	
