= Your Decision =

2009 single by Alice in Chains

Single by Alice in Chains

from the album Black Gives Way to Blue
- Released: November 16, 2009
- Recorded: October 23, 2008 – March 18, 2009
- Studio: Studio 606 in Northridge, California
- Genre: Alternative rock; acoustic rock
- Length: 4:43
- Label: Virgin; EMI
- Songwriter: Jerry Cantrell
- Producer: Nick Raskulinecz

Alice in Chains singles chronology
"Check My Brain" (2009)	"Your Decision" (2009)	"Lesson Learned" (2010)

Music video
- "Your Decision" on YouTube

"Your Decision" is a song by Alice in Chains, featured on their fourth studio album, Black Gives Way to Blue (2009). Written by Jerry Cantrell, who also sings lead vocals on the song, it was released as the second single from the album on November 16, 2009 in the UK, and on December 1, 2009 in the US. The single reached No. 1 on the Billboard Hot Rock Songs and Mainstream Rock charts, and No. 4 on the Alternative Songs chart. "Your Decision" was featured on CSI's season 10, episode 8, "Lover's Lane".

== Lyrics ==
In an interview for the making of the video of "Your Decision", singer William DuVall stated that "This song is all about choices and their consequences". Many fans believe this song was written from Jerry Cantrell to the band's late co-lead singer Layne Staley, who was unable to kick his addiction to drugs and died in 2002.

DuVall and drummer Sean Kinney stated that the song has a simple message: DuVall: "Consequences, you know. It's your decision. You've got to sleep in the bed you make, you know. Things happen, and it's just funny how one little left or right turn in your life can just totally take you off on a tangent that can be so bizarre and unanticipated, you know."

Kinney: "I've taken a lot of lefts and a lot of rights. I'm sure we all have. You've got to deal with it when you get there."

== Music video ==
The music video was released on December 1, 2009 via iTunes Music Store, and was directed by Stephen Schuster, who had previously directed the music video for "A Looking in View". It was shot at an ornate Malibu mansion and pays homages to Stanley Kubrick films, such as The Shining and Eyes Wide Shut. It also references 1 Corinthians 10:23, the first verse of a passage giving guidelines about eating meat which has been offered in sacrifice to idols. According to drummer Sean Kinney, there were at least three different endings for the video. The video features Californian-based model Sarah Stage and Project Runway season three model Amanda Fields.

The video depicts the band playing at a party at a large mansion. The narrative portions of the video are shot in first person; the protagonist is invited to the party by a card dropped at their door by Stage. At the party, Stage lures the protagonist upstairs while a bald man follows them; the protagonist sees many bizarre and vaguely sexual activities in the rooms upstairs. They finally enter a room at the end of the hall where Stage starts to remove her clothes, but the protagonist is knocked out by the bald man, and wakes up to see Stage approaching them with a tray; she brands them with a number. It is revealed that the party guests correspond to various numbers on a menu for a group of older men eating human meat in a back room; the protagonist's heart is shown being eaten by Stage at the end.

In January 2010, Alice in Chains released a behind-the-scenes video about the making of the music video.

On February 10, 2010, the band launched a contest in partnership with PopCult and Devil's Due Publishing to give the fans a chance to add their own chapter to the storyline depicted in the video. Fans were challenged to post suggestions for what they think should happen in the next chapter in 150 words or less. Fans were encouraged to post their submissions via Facebook and Twitter. Once approved, all new chapter posts were made viewable to the public. They could be read, commented on, and "liked" by other users. At each chapter stage the submission with the most "likes" was the winner. The winners had their chapters illustrated by PopCult/Devil's Due and immortalized into the "Your Decision" comic book. The Grand Prize winner was chosen by the band and included a flyaway trip for two to New York to see Alice in Chains play a sold-out concert at Terminal 5 on March 9, 2010, two nights accommodations and the chance to meet the band. The four runners-up got a limited edition illustrated "Your Decision" comic lithograph signed by the band. The finalized comic (comprising six chapters) was offered as a free PDF download to everyone.

== Appearances in other media ==
The song was featured on the TV show CSI, on season 10 episode 8, "Lover's Lane".

On January 12, 2010, it was released as downloadable content for the Rock Band video game series.

== Track listing ==
CD Single (509994 58606 2 1)

1. "Your Decision" (radio edit) – 4:00
2. "Your Decision" (album version) – 4:43

== Personnel ==
- Jerry Cantrell – lead vocals, lead guitar, acoustic guitar
- William DuVall – vocals, rhythm guitar, acoustic guitar
- Mike Inez – bass
- Sean Kinney – drums

== Charts ==
=== Weekly charts ===
Chart (2009–2010)	Peak position
Canada Hot 100 (Billboard)	57
Canada Rock (Billboard)	1
US Bubbling Under Hot 100 (Billboard)	9
US Hot Rock & Alternative Songs (Billboard)	1

=== Year-end charts ===
Chart (2010)	Position
US Hot Rock & Alternative Songs (Billboard)	8

== See also ==
- List of number-one Billboard Rock Songs
- List of Billboard Mainstream Rock number-one songs of the 2000s
