= Lesson Learned =

2010 single by Alice in Chains

Single by Alice in Chains

from the album Black Gives Way to Blue
- Released: 2010
- Recorded: October 23, 2008 – March 18, 2009
- Studio: Studio 606 in Northridge, California
- Length: 4:17
- Label: Virgin/EMI
- Songwriter: Jerry Cantrell
- Producer: Nick Raskulinecz

Alice in Chains singles chronology
| "Your Decision" (2009) | "Lesson Learned" (2010) | "Hollow" (2012) |

"Lesson Learned" is a song by the American rock band Alice in Chains, featured on their fourth studio album, Black Gives Way to Blue (2009). It was released as the third and final single from the album in 2010. The song reached No. 4 on Billboard's Mainstream Rock Tracks, and No. 10 on Hot Rock Songs.

== Music video ==
The music video for "Lesson Learned" was released on September 22, 2010 on Yahoo Music beta. It is also featured on Alice in Chains new YouTube channel. The video was conceived and co-directed by Paul Matthaeus, Bobby Hougham and Sevrin Daniels. Paul Matthaeus is best known for his groundbreaking main titles on the award-winning series Dexter, True Blood, and Six Feet Under. The video is composed of over 6,000 still pictures stitched together to create a visually stunning stop-frame animated clip. The video also is available in Explicit and Edited versions.

== Personnel ==
- Jerry Cantrell – lead vocals, lead guitar
- William DuVall – rhythm guitar, backing vocals
- Mike Inez – bass
- Sean Kinney – drums

== Chart positions ==
=== Weekly charts ===
| Chart (2010) | Peak position |
|---|---|
| Canada Rock (Billboard) | 4 |
| US Hot Rock & Alternative Songs (Billboard) | 10 |

=== Year-end charts ===
| Chart (2010) | Position |
|---|---|
| US Hot Rock Songs (Billboard) | 41 |
