= Cyanide (song) =

Promotional single by Metallica

from the album Death Magnetic
- Released: September 2, 2008
- Recorded: March 12, 2007 – May 11, 2008
- Studio: Sound City, Van Nuys, California; Shangri La, Malibu, California; HQ, San Rafael, California
- Length: 6:39
- Label: Warner Bros.
- Composers: James Hetfield; Lars Ulrich; Kirk Hammett; Robert Trujillo
- Lyricist: James Hetfield
- Producer: Rick Rubin

Metallica singles chronology
"My Apocalypse" (2008)	"Cyanide" (2008)	"The Judas Kiss" (2008)

"Cyanide" is a song by American heavy metal band Metallica, the first promotional single taken from their ninth studio album, Death Magnetic. On September 1, 2008, it was made available for streaming on the band's official website, as well as a download (for Platinum Members only) from the Death Magnetic website Mission: Metallica. It has since been made available for purchase as a digital single in the iTunes Store.

The song was played live for the first time on August 9, 2008 at Ozzfest in Dallas, Texas, and was the first song from Death Magnetic to be performed live in its entirety. An audio recording of the performance is featured on the band's MySpace page. The song was also performed live on Later... with Jools Holland in 2008.

== Track listing ==
iTunes single
No.	Title	Length
1.	"Cyanide"	6:38

== Personnel ==
Metallica

- James Hetfield – rhythm guitar, vocals
- Lars Ulrich – drums
- Kirk Hammett – lead guitar
- Robert Trujillo – bass guitar

Production

- Rick Rubin – producer
- Ted Jensen – mastering
- Greg Fidelman – mixing

== Chart performance ==
In March 2009, "Cyanide" became Metallica's seventh number-one hit on the Billboard Mainstream Rock chart. It is their second consecutive number one on the chart from Death Magnetic, making the album only the band's second to spawn two number-one hits on the chart (1996's Load being the first). It is also the band's fifth top twenty hit on the Billboard Modern Rock chart, peaking at No. 19. The song peaked at No. 50 on the Billboard Hot 100 due to being released as a digital single prior to Death Magnetic's release.

"Cyanide" has been successful worldwide as well, reaching the top twenty in Canada, Finland, Norway, and Sweden, and the top fifty in Australia, the UK, and Ireland.

=== Charts ===
Chart (2008)	Peak position
Australian ARIA Singles Chart	48
Canadian Hot 100	19
Danish Singles Chart	23
Finnish Singles Chart	3
Irish Singles Chart	48
Italian Singles Chart	61
Norwegian Singles Chart	15
Swedish Singles Chart	14
UK Singles Chart	48
U.S. Billboard Hot 100	50
U.S. Billboard Mainstream Rock Tracks	1
U.S. Billboard Modern Rock Tracks	19

== See also ==
- List of Billboard Mainstream Rock number-one songs of the 2000s
