= Boozed, Broozed & Broken-Boned =

Video by Black Label Society
- Released: August 12, 2003
- Recorded: September 14, 2002
- Venue: Harpos Concert Theatre in Detroit, Michigan
- Genre: Heavy metal; southern metal; hard rock
- Length: 120 minutes
- Label: Eagle Vision
- Producer: Ken Botelho

Black Label Society chronology
The Blessed Hellride (2003)	Boozed, Broozed & Broken-Boned (2003)	Hangover Music Vol. VI (2004)

Professional ratings
Review scores
Source	Rating
Metal.de	8/10

Boozed, Broozed & Broken-Boned is the first video album by American heavy metal band Black Label Society, released on August 12, 2003. It was recorded at the Harpos Concert Theatre in Detroit, Michigan on September 14, 2002.

== History ==
Released in 2003, Boozed, Broozed & Broken-Boned was recorded at the Harpos Concert Theatre in Detroit on September 14, 2002. On March 6, 2013, an unblackened version of the concert was released. It was recorded at Club Nokia in Los Angeles. On June 13 and 19, 2020, both the unblackened and original recording of Boozed, Broozed & Broken-Boned were streamed via YouTube.

== Track listing ==
1. "Demise of Sanity"
2. "Graveyard Disciples"
3. "Bleed for Me"
4. "13 Years of Grief"
5. "Stronger Than Death"
6. "Genocide Junkies"
7. "Spoke in the Wheel"
8. "Born to Lose"
9. "World of Trouble"
10. "Guitar Solo"
11. "Band Intros"
12. "All for You"
13. "Super Terrorizer"
14. "Berserkers"

=== Extra features ===
- Interview with Zakk Wylde
- Lesson from Zakk's instructional video "Hardcore Vol. 1"
- "Stillborn" music video
- Tokyo Chapter performance footage
- 3 Mins. with Rae Rae
- Slightly Amped (acoustic performance)
- Discography
- Stupid Shit (outtakes)
- The Star Spangled Banner (live at a Los Angeles Kings game)

== Personnel ==
- Zakk Wylde – vocals, guitar
- Nick Catanese – guitar, backing vocals
- Robert Trujillo – bass
- Craig Nunenmacher – drums
- Mike Inez – bass (Tokyo performance)
- Brian P Slusarz – art and layout
