= Hangover Music Vol. VI =

Studio album by Black Label Society
- Released: April 20, 2004
- Recorded: Paramount Studios, Los Angeles, California
- Genres: Hard rock, acoustic rock
- Length: 66:45
- Label: Spitfire
- Producer: Zakk Wylde

Black Label Society chronology
Boozed, Broozed & Broken-Boned (2003)	Hangover Music Vol. VI (2004)	Mafia (2005)

Professional ratings
Review scores
Source	Rating
AllMusic	2.5/5 stars
Metal.de	8/10
Rock Hard	8/10

Hangover Music Vol. VI is the fifth studio album by American heavy metal band Black Label Society, released April 20, 2004. This album is a much more mellow affair than any other Black Label Society album, and some fans have recognized it as a nod back to Zakk Wylde's solo effort, Book of Shadows, from 1996. The album contains a piano version of Procol Harum's 1967 No. 1 song "A Whiter Shade of Pale" and a song entitled "Layne", which is written in memory of Layne Staley of Alice in Chains.

The song "No Other" is a leftover track from The Blessed Hellride sessions, which explains why Zakk Wylde played bass on this song, whereas other bassists played on the rest of the album. The song was also recorded, mixed, and mastered by the same team that was responsible for the production on The Blessed Hellride.

This was the last album that Black Label Society recorded for Spitfire Records; it was recorded as a contract fulfilling obligation, and therefore received very little promotion from the label. None of the songs from this album were performed live by the band until 2009 when "Damage Is Done" was performed.

== Track listing ==
All tracks are written by Zakk Wylde, except where noted.

No.	Title	Length
1.	"Crazy or High"	3:34
2.	"Queen of Sorrow"	4:15
3.	"Steppin' Stone"	4:54
4.	"Yesterday, Today, Tomorrow"	3:43
5.	"Takillya (Estyabon)"	0:39
6.	"Won't Find It Here"	6:26
7.	"She Deserves a Free Ride (Val's Song)"	4:19
8.	"House of Doom"	3:46
9.	"Damage Is Done"	5:20
10.	"Layne"	5:15
11.	"Woman Don't Cry"	5:39
12.	"No Other"	4:59
13.	"A Whiter Shade of Pale" (Gary Brooker, Keith Reid, Matthew Fisher)	5:08
14.	"Once More"	4:10
15.	"Fear"	4:38
Total length:		66:45

== Personnel ==
Black Label Society

- Zakk Wylde – guitars, vocals, bass (track 12), piano
- Craig Nunenmacher – drums
- John Tempesta – drums (track 14)
- James LoMenzo – bass (tracks 3, 4, 6–8, 11, 15)
- John DeServio – bass (tracks 2, 9, 10, 14)
- Mike Inez – bass (track 1)

Production

- Produced by Zakk Wylde
- Associate producer and engineer – Barry Conley
- Mixed by Barry Conley and Zakk Wylde
- Mastered by Bill Dooley
- "No Other" associated produced by Eddie Mapp, mixed by Eddie Mapp and Zakk Wylde, assistant engineered by Steve Crowder, and mastered by Steve Marcussen
- Artwork concept – Zakk Wylde
- Artwork assistance – Rob "RA" Arvizn
- Photography – Neil Zlozower
- Management – Bob Ringe (Survival Management)

== Charts ==
Chart performance for Hangover Music Vol. VI
Chart (2004)	Peak position
US Billboard 200	40
