= Black Gives Way to Blue (song) =

2009 song by Alice In Chains

Song by Alice in Chains

from the album Black Gives Way to Blue
- Released: September 29, 2009 (album release)
- Recorded: October 23, 2008–April 23, 2009
- Studio: Studio 606 in Northridge, California; Unknown studio in Las Vegas, Nevada
- Genre: Alternative rock, acoustic rock
- Length: 3:03
- Label: Virgin/EMI
- Songwriter(s): Jerry Cantrell
- Producer(s): Nick Raskulinecz, Alice in Chains

"Black Gives Way to Blue" is a song by American rock band Alice in Chains, and the last track on their 2009 studio album of the same name. Written and sung by guitarist/vocalist Jerry Cantrell, it features Elton John on piano. The song is a tribute to the band's late lead singer, Layne Staley, who died in 2002. Cantrell described the song as the band's goodbye to Staley. The first concert that Staley attended was Elton John's, and Cantrell's first album was Elton John Greatest Hits (1974). A piano mix of the song is a bonus track on iTunes. The lyrics to "Black Gives Way to Blue" are printed on the base plate of Jerry Cantrell's signature Cry Baby Wah-Wah pedal.

== Origin and recording ==
"Black Gives Way to Blue" was written by Alice in Chains' guitarist and vocalist Jerry Cantrell, and it was one of the first songs he wrote for the band's album of the same name – their first album since 1995's self-titled record. It was also the last track the band recorded for the album. The song, which features the lyrics "Imitations are pale" and "Lay down/I'll remember you", is a tribute to the band's late lead singer, Layne Staley.

Months before writing the song, Cantrell had been suffering from an unexplained illness. He told Guitar World, "I got deathly ill. I had these mystery migraines, intense physical pain, and I'd even gotten a spinal tap to test for certain things. They never could find anything wrong with me. I felt I was puking up all this undigested grief in losing Layne." Once Cantrell started writing the song and the rest of the album, his mystery illness disappeared. Cantrell told Noisecreep that the night the track was recorded, the band was "crying their eyes out". But he thought writing the song was going to kill him. "I sent it to Sean Kinney, and then immediately I started getting these f—ing migraine headaches where I felt like my brain was like unseated in my skull. I went through this mystery illness for about three weeks immediately following that where I really thought I was gonna f—ing die. I was in physical pain to the point of tears, and they couldn't find anything wrong with me." Looking back on it, Cantrell said that he believes it was the pain of saying goodbye to Staley. "I think what it really came down to there was a huge chunk of grief there I'd been holding onto for a long time. I think we all have." Cantrell said, "I'm really, really proud of that song. I'm proud of it for a lot of reasons. It's all about facing up, owning your s–t, owning your good stuff and your bad stuff, and continuing to walk forward and live a life."

In 2009, Cantrell invited Elton John to collaborate with Alice in Chains playing the piano in "Black Gives Way to Blue", the title track and closing song on the album. Cantrell described the song as the band's goodbye to Staley. The first concert that Staley attended was Elton John's, and his mother revealed that he was blown away by it. And Cantrell's first album was Elton John Greatest Hits (1974), a gift that he received from his father when he was 10 years old.

The collaboration was born when Cantrell thought the track could use a little piano, so a friend of his, Baldy, who had worked with Elton John before, suggested the band should call him. John was recording down the hall in the studio the band was working in, so Cantrell sent him a note and a tape explaining that this was the title track and "a song from the heart for Layne", and asked, "Would you consider playing some keyboards on it, whatever the hell you want?" A week later, Cantrell was out to lunch during a studio break and his cell phone rang. The studio manager called him and said that Elton John wanted to talk "right now". Cantrell left his burger sitting on the plate and rushed back. John said he was moved by the track, was a fan of Alice's and Layne's and would be glad to play on it. A few weeks later, the band flew to Las Vegas and Cantrell watched John add piano to the song, the band's first signature piano track. John also sings backing vocals on the track, which he recorded in a Las Vegas studio on April 23, 2009 while he was finishing his Red Piano residency.

Cantrell said of the collaboration:

Elton is a very important musical influence to all of us in varying degrees, and especially to me. My first album was Elton John Greatest Hits. And actually, we were reminded by Layne's stepfather that Elton was his first concert, so it was all really appropriate. So I wrote [Elton] an e-mail and explained what his music meant to us, and that this song was for Layne. We sent him a demo, and he said it was beautiful and he'd love to play on it. In the studio he was really relaxed and gracious, and he's got a great sense of humor. We were just trying to be cool: 'Oh, yeah, no big deal.' But we were excited. [Drummer Sean Kinney] and I had to walk out a couple of times to smoke cigarettes, like, 'Holy s—, this is killer.' It's one of those highlights you can't expect in life, and you're lucky to get them once in a while. And that is one.

Elton John stated that he's been a big admirer of Cantrell for quite some time and couldn't resist the offer to play on the track. He told Entertainment Weekly:

I was kind of surprised that Alice in Chains would ask me to do anything. I never thought I'd play on an Alice in Chains record. When I heard the song I really wanted to do it. I liked the fact that it was so beautiful and very simple. They had a great idea of what they wanted me to do on it and it turned out great.

In 2016, Cantrell told Metal Hammer that it's still difficult for him to listen to the song.

That song really set it in stone, because we had to properly address Layne's death and say goodbye to our friend. We had done it privately, but if we were going to do this, we had to do it publicly. It's a beautiful song and it's still really tough for me to listen to.

== Song title ==
When Chris Cornell and Susan Silver's then 9-year-old daughter Lily asked her mother "what does 'Black Gives Way to Blue' mean?", Silver suggested they call her uncle Jerry [Cantrell] and ask him, and Cantrell explained to her:

Sometimes there are very dark and challenging times in life and it may seem like things will never get better. But if you stay strong and keep moving forward and look out on the horizon, you'll start to see a little point of light way out there. And slowly, the black would give way to blue.

On December 1, 2020, Cornell Silver made her musical debut performing the song along with Chris DeGarmo at the MoPOP Founders Award tribute to Alice in Chains following an introduction by her mother.

== Reception ==
Christian Hoard of Rolling Stone stated that the song "is pretty in a calm-after-the-storm way."

Matt Melis of Consequence of Sound called it "a beautiful and plaintive tribute to Staley."

Mike Ragogna of The Huffington Post said of the track: "That touching title track is a killer—actually, a heartbreaker—and it says more about the band's healing process than any shrink's assessment would."

== Live performances ==
The song was performed live for the first time during an exclusive listening party for fans and members of the press, at the Ricardo Montalban Theatre in Los Angeles on July 14, 2009. A photo of Layne Staley was displayed on a screen at the end of the performance when the band played the song during their 2009 tour. For the encore of Alice in Chains' concert at the Moore Theatre in Seattle on September 24, 2009, Jerry Cantrell sat on a stool and played an acoustic version of the song with an empty stool and microphone positioned next to him while the band was offstage.

Alice in Chains performed the song for the first time on TV on the British TV show Later... with Jools Holland on November 10, 2009, with host Jools Holland on piano.

The song has not been performed live by Alice in Chains since their concert at the Key Arena in Seattle on October 8, 2010. Jerry Cantrell performed the song during his solo concert at the Pico Union Project in Los Angeles on December 6, 2019.

== Personnel ==
- Jerry Cantrell – lead vocals, guitars
- Elton John – piano, backing vocals
- Lisa Coleman – vibraphone
