= Decades Rock Live! =

American television series of rock concerts

Decades Rock Live! is an American TV series of live concerts. The program premiered on VH1 Classic in winter 2006.

It features "performances by celebrated artists from rock to soul who have influenced popular music over the last 50 years, as well as performances from some of today's hottest recording acts who have been inspired by these legends." Each one-hour episode pays tribute to a "specific artist". The series also features several special-themed shows that included recording acts from the past five decades celebrating a specific musical genre or period. The series was broadcast on VH1 Classic, In Demand's Mojo HD in high-definition in 5.1 surround sound and syndicated worldwide.

Decades Rock Live! was taped at the Etess Arena (which was temporarily renamed to "The Decades Rock Arena" for the series) at the Trump Taj Mahal casino and hotel in Atlantic City, New Jersey. Each music performance is "augmented with special features" including "Decades Confidential", described as "exclusive behind-the-scenes interviews with the spotlighted artists focusing on their career milestones and highlighting their newest releases, concert performances and other endeavors", and "Fan Factoids", which were sent "from viewers sharing their knowledge of music facts and figures, incorporated as pop-up quotes and trivia in every episode" (akin to VH1's Pop-Up Video).

The series was executive produced by Barry Summers for World Productions, and Eric Sherman, the senior vice president and general manager of VH1 Classic and co-produced by Tisha Fein. The supervising producer was Barry Ehrmann, and Steve Gietka, vice president of entertainment at Trump Entertainment Resorts, served as associate producer.

Lineups include:

- The Doors (Robby Krieger and Ray Manzarek with The Cult's Ian Astbury) with special guests Jane's Addiction's Perry Farrell, Macy Gray, Antigone Rising, Vanilla Fudge, Pat Travers and John Sebastian (August 5, 2005)
- Bonnie Raitt with special guests Norah Jones, Ben Harper, Alison Krauss and Keb' Mo' (September 30, 2005)
- Cyndi Lauper with special guests Velvet Revolver's Scott Weiland, Train's Pat Monahan, Shaggy, Ani DiFranco and The Hooters (November 11, 2005)
- Heart with special guests Alice in Chains, Jane's Addiction's Dave Navarro, Rufus Wainwright, Carrie Underwood, Gretchen Wilson, Guns N' Roses' Duff McKagan and Pantera's Phil Anselmo (March 10, 2006)
- Elvis Costello with special guests Death Cab for Cutie, Fiona Apple and Green Day's Billie Joe Armstrong (May 19, 2006)
- Lynyrd Skynyrd with special guests 3 Doors Down, Bo Bice and Hank Williams Jr. (June 23, 2006)
- The Pretenders with special guests Incubus, Iggy Pop, Kings of Leon and Garbage's Shirley Manson (August 11, 2006)
