= Check My Brain =

2009 single by Alice in Chains

Single by Alice in Chains

from the album Black Gives Way to Blue
- Released: August 14, 2009
- Genre: Grunge; hard rock
- Length: 3:57
- Label: Virgin/EMI
- Songwriter: Jerry Cantrell
- Producer: Nick Raskulinecz

Alice in Chains singles chronology
"A Looking in View" (2009)	"Check My Brain" (2009)	"Your Decision" (2009)

Music video
- "Check My Brain" on YouTube

"Check My Brain" is a song by the American rock band Alice in Chains, featured on their fourth studio album, Black Gives Way to Blue (2009). It was released as the first official single from the album on August 14, 2009, marking it as the band's first single in a decade (since 1999's "Fear the Voices"). The single topped the Billboard Hot Mainstream Rock Tracks and Billboard Hot Rock Songs charts in September 2009. This was the first time an Alice in Chains song would hit number-one on the Hot Mainstream Rock Tracks chart since their 1994 single "No Excuses". This is Alice in Chains' first and currently only song to chart on the Billboard Hot 100, peaking at number 92, and also their first number-one on the Alternative Songs chart. "Check My Brain" received a nomination for "Best Hard Rock Performance" at the 52nd Grammy Awards.

== Lyrics ==
"Check My Brain" features the lyric "California's all right/Somebody check my brain...". The lyric is in reference to guitarist Jerry Cantrell moving to Los Angeles, California in 2003, with Cantrell commenting, "I like how I am right now...and I like where I'm living."

Cantrell on the song:

There's a certain aspect of sarcasm, I guess, being a guy from Seattle who lives in L.A., ex-drug addict who lives in the belly of the beast and doesn't partake, and being totally cool with that...It's like being the bad gambler and living in Vegas. It's right there. It's just the irony of that and a little bit of sarcasm. And it's not putting this place down at all. It's just kind of like, 'Wow, you know, check my brain, wow.'

== Composition ==
The song is in the A# Major key.

== Release and reception ==
On August 12, 2009, the band released a 30-second sample of the new single. On August 14, 2009, the full version of the song was released to radio stations as the first official single from the album. "A Looking in View" was available for purchase and was streaming for free on the band's website in June 2009, but it wasn't released as the album's first single.

Ronald Hart of Billboard said that the song "is faithful to the grunge terrain Alice in Chains mapped out in 1995. Written by guitarist/chief songwriter Jerry Cantrell, who shares lead vocal duties with William DuVall, the song revolves around Cantrell's distaste for his relocation from rainy Seattle to sunny Los Angeles. The band's classic, downtuned stomp could easily pass for an unreleased track from the Dirt era and is sure to keep longtime fans feeling pleasantly dystopic."

In 2012, Loudwire ranked the song at number 39 on their list of "Top 50 Hard Rock Songs of the 21st Century".

== Music video ==
The music video for "Check My Brain" premiered on September 14, 2009 and was directed by Alexandre Courtes. The video shows the band in a discolored setting in Los Angeles, California where Cantrell moved in 2003.

On October 1, 2009, Alice in Chains released a behind-the-scenes video about the making of the music video.

== Live performances ==
Alice in Chains debuted "Check My Brain" on August 1, 2009 in Marlay Park, Dublin, Ireland. They played it again the next day at the Sonisphere Festival in Knebworth Park, Stevenage, United Kingdom, and again two days later on August 4, 2009 at The Scala in London. The song is regularly performed at the band's concerts.

== Personnel ==
Alice in Chains

- Jerry Cantrell – lead vocals, lead guitar
- William DuVall – backing vocals, rhythm guitar
- Mike Inez – bass
- Sean Kinney – drums

Production

- Mastering – Ted Jensen
- Mixing – Randy Staub

== Chart performance ==
"Check My Brain" has become one of the band's most commercially successful singles of their career, especially on rock radio. This was their second number-one on the Billboard Hot Mainstream Rock Tracks chart, after 1994's "No Excuses". It became their first number-one song on the Alternative Songs chart and also topped Billboard's Hot Rock Songs chart, which combines mainstream and alternative rock airplay. "Check My Brain" debuted at number 99 of the Hot 100 on the chart issue of October 3, 2009, peaking at number 92. In addition, it charted on the Canadian Hot 100, reaching number 62.

== Charts ==
=== Weekly charts ===
Chart (2009)	Peak position
Canada Hot 100 (Billboard)	62
Canada Rock (Billboard)	4
US Billboard Hot 100	92
US Hot Rock & Alternative Songs (Billboard)	1
US Alternative Airplay (Billboard)	1
US Mainstream Rock (Billboard)	1

=== Year-end charts ===
Chart (2009)	Position
US Hot Rock & Alternative Songs (Billboard)	18
Chart (2010)	Position
US Hot Rock & Alternative Songs (Billboard)	37

== See also ==
- List of number-one Billboard Rock Songs
- List of Billboard number-one alternative singles of the 2000s
- List of Billboard Mainstream Rock number-one songs of the 2000s
