= List of Billboard Mainstream Rock number-one songs of the 2000s =

The 2000s in rock radio in the United States saw a continued blurring of the playlists among mainstream rock and alternative rock stations. Every track that was ranked by Billboard as the number-one song of the year on its Mainstream Rock Tracks chart during the decade was also a top-five hit on the Alternative Songs chart, most of which topped both charts. In June 2009, Billboard debuted the Rock Songs chart which combined the data of the two charts and its Triple A chart.

Two of the biggest artists on the Mainstream Rock chart during the 2000s not only had success on the Modern Rock/Alternative charts, but also crossed over into the realm of Top 40 pop music. The top mainstream rock song of the decade, "Kryptonite" by 3 Doors Down, peaked at No. 3 on the Hot 100 and was a No. 1 pop hit. The top mainstream rock artist of the decade was Nickelback, who had the second biggest song on the Mainstream Rock chart during the 2000s with "How You Remind Me" and led all other artists with seven number ones during the decade. "How You Remind Me" was ranked as the fourth biggest song on the decade-ending Billboard Hot 100 chart.

== Number ones of the 2000s ==
† – Number-one song of the year

Issue date	Song	Artist(s)	Weeks at number one (Note: Weeks spent at number one in this decade)	Ref.
2000
January 1	"Higher"	Creed	3	
January 22	"No Leaf Clover"	Metallica	7	
March 11	"Stiff Upper Lip"	AC/DC	4	
April 8	"Kryptonite"†	3 Doors Down	9	
June 10	"I Disappear"	Metallica	4	
July 8	"With Arms Wide Open"	Creed	4	
August 5	"I Disappear"	Metallica	3	
August 26	"Californication"	Red Hot Chili Peppers	2	
September 9	"Loser"	3 Doors Down	21	
2001
February 3	"Awake"	Godsmack	1	
February 10	"Jaded"	Aerosmith	5	
March 17	"Outside"	Aaron Lewis with Fred Durst	2	
March 31	"Breakdown"	Tantric	1	
April 7	"Duck and Run"	3 Doors Down	3	
April 28	"It's Been Awhile"†	Staind	20	
September 15	"How You Remind Me"	Nickelback	13	
December 15	"My Sacrifice"	Creed	9	
2002
February 16	"Blurry"†	Puddle of Mudd	10	
April 27	"Too Bad"	Nickelback	3	
May 18	"I Stand Alone"	Godsmack	4	
June 15	"Hero"	Chad Kroeger featuring Josey Scott	2	
June 29	"Drift & Die"	Puddle of Mudd	6	
August 10	"By the Way"	Red Hot Chili Peppers	7	
September 28	"Aerials"	System of a Down	1	
October 5	"Never Again"	Nickelback	3	
October 26	"She Hates Me"	Puddle of Mudd	1	
November 2	"You Know You're Right"	Nirvana	4	
November 30	"When I'm Gone"	3 Doors Down	17	
2003
March 29	"Straight Out of Line"	Godsmack	2	
April 12	"Somewhere I Belong"	Linkin Park	1	
April 19	"Like a Stone"	Audioslave	12	
July 12	"Send the Pain Below"	Chevelle	2	
July 26	"Headstrong"†	Trapt	1	
August 2	"Send the Pain Below"	Chevelle	2	
August 16	"So Far Away"	Staind	14	
November 22	"Weak and Powerless"	A Perfect Circle	2	
December 6	"Still Frame"	Trapt	1	
December 13	"Away from Me"	Puddle of Mudd	3	
2004
January 3	"Numb"	Linkin Park	3	
January 24	"Figured You Out"†	Nickelback	13	
April 24	"Cold Hard Bitch"	Jet	8	
June 19	"Slither"	Velvet Revolver	9	
August 21	"Just Like You"	Three Days Grace	3	
September 11	"Breaking the Habit"	Linkin Park	3	
October 2	"Fall to Pieces"	Velvet Revolver	11	
December 18	"Vitamin R (Leading Us Along)"	Chevelle	2	
2005
January 1	"Boulevard of Broken Dreams"†	Green Day	14	
April 9	"Be Yourself"	Audioslave	7	
May 28	"Happy?"	Mudvayne	1	
June 4	"Holiday"	Green Day	3	
June 25	"Remedy"	Seether	5	
July 30	"Best of You"	Foo Fighters	4	
August 27	"Remedy"	Seether	3	
September 17	"Right Here"	Staind	2	
October 1	"Photograph"	Nickelback	7	
November 19	"Save Me"	Shinedown	12	
2006
February 11	"Animals"	Nickelback	6	
March 25	"Speak"	Godsmack	6	
May 6	"Dani California"	Red Hot Chili Peppers	12	
July 29	"Animal I Have Become"†	Three Days Grace	7	
September 16	"Through Glass"	Stone Sour	7	
November 4	"Land of Confusion"	Disturbed	3	
November 25	"The Pot"	Tool	4	
December 23	"Pain"	Three Days Grace	13	
2007 (Note: Papa Roach's "Forever" peaked at number 2 on the Mainstream Rock chart in April 2007 but was ranked number one on the year-end chart for 2007.)
March 24	"Breath"	Breaking Benjamin	7	
May 12	"What I've Done"	Linkin Park	8	
July 7	"I Don't Wanna Stop"	Ozzy Osbourne	5	
August 11	"Paralyzer"	Finger Eleven	1	
August 18	"Never Too Late"	Three Days Grace	7	
October 6	"The Pretender"	Foo Fighters	6	
November 17	"Fake It"	Seether	14	
2008
February 23	"Psycho"†	Puddle of Mudd	9	
April 26	"It's Not My Time"	3 Doors Down	3	
May 17	"Inside the Fire"	Disturbed	14	
August 23	"Devour"	Shinedown	3	
September 13	"Bad Girlfriend"	Theory of a Deadman	1	
September 20	"The Day That Never Comes"	Metallica	2	
October 4	"Bad Girlfriend"	Theory of a Deadman	1	
October 11	"The Day That Never Comes"	Metallica	7	
November 29	"Rock 'N Roll Train"	AC/DC	3	
December 20	"I Don't Care"	Apocalyptica featuring Adam Gontier	1	
December 27	"Second Chance"† (2009)	Shinedown	10	
2009
March 7	"Something in Your Mouth"	Nickelback	4	
April 4	"Cyanide"	Metallica	2	
April 18	"Lifeline"	Papa Roach	6	
May 30	"Know Your Enemy"	Green Day	3	
June 20	"Sound of Madness"	Shinedown	3	
July 11	"New Divide"	Linkin Park	8	
September 5	"Champagne"	Cavo	1	
September 12	"Whiskey Hangover"	Godsmack	3	
October 3	"Check My Brain"	Alice in Chains	8	
November 28	"I Will Not Bow"	Breaking Benjamin	2	
December 12	"Break"† (2010)	Three Days Grace	3	
