= Black Gives Way to Blue =

Studio album by Alice in Chains
- Released: September 29, 2009
- Recorded: October 23, 2008 – March 18, 2009
- Studios: Studio 606 in Northridge, California; Henson Recording Studios in Los Angeles
- Genres: Grunge; alternative metal; sludge metal; heavy metal
- Length: 54:12
- Label: Virgin/EMI
- Producers: Nick Raskulinecz; Alice in Chains

Alice in Chains chronology
The Essential Alice in Chains (2006)	Black Gives Way to Blue (2009)	The Devil Put Dinosaurs Here (2013)

Singles from Black Gives Way to Blue
- 1. "A Looking in View" Released: June 30, 2009; 2. "Check My Brain" Released: August 14, 2009; 3. "Your Decision" Released: November 16, 2009; 4. "Lesson Learned" Released: 2010

Black Gives Way to Blue is the fourth studio album by the American rock band Alice in Chains, released on September 29, 2009, through a joint venture between Virgin and EMI Records. Its release fell on the 17th anniversary of the release of their second album, Dirt. It is their first record without founding lead singer Layne Staley, who died in 2002, and their first album with rhythm guitarist and vocalist William DuVall. It is the band's first venture away from Columbia Records, who handled all of their previous releases. The span of nearly fourteen years between the self-titled album and Black Gives Way to Blue marks the longest gap between studio albums in Alice in Chains' career.

After ceasing activity following Staley's death, the band reunited in early 2005 to play a benefit show, subsequently deciding to reunite to play live full-time. DuVall joined the band in Staley's place in 2006. Work on the album began in April 2007, but recording did not begin until October 2008 with producer Nick Raskulinecz. The album was recorded at Dave Grohl's Studio 606 in Northridge and at the Henson Recording Studios in Los Angeles, produced by Raskulinecz and Alice in Chains. The slow progress was partly due to the fact that the band did not have a record label at the time of the recording; the album was funded by Cantrell and drummer Sean Kinney. The recording process was completed on March 18, 2009, Cantrell's 43rd birthday. The band had signed with Virgin and EMI by late April.

Musically, the album sees the band return to the heavy metal/hard rock style of Dirt and Facelift instead of the murky dark mood that their third album showcased with more grunge-fuzz pedal elements; some songs are noted for their acoustic elements. It also includes songs which Cantrell described as "the heaviest he's ever written". Most of the lead vocal performances on the album were recorded by Cantrell; DuVall contributed lead vocals to "Last of My Kind", as well as backing vocals throughout the album.

The album debuted at No. 5 on the Billboard 200, and was certified gold by the RIAA on May 26, 2010, with shipments exceeding 500,000 copies in the U.S. and over 1 million copies sold worldwide. It spawned four singles: "A Looking in View", "Check My Brain", "Your Decision", and "Lesson Learned". "Check My Brain" and "A Looking in View" were both nominated for the Grammy Award for Best Hard Rock Performance in 2010 and 2011, respectively. Black Gives Way to Blue won Revolver magazine's Golden Gods Award for Album of the Year in 2010.

== Background ==
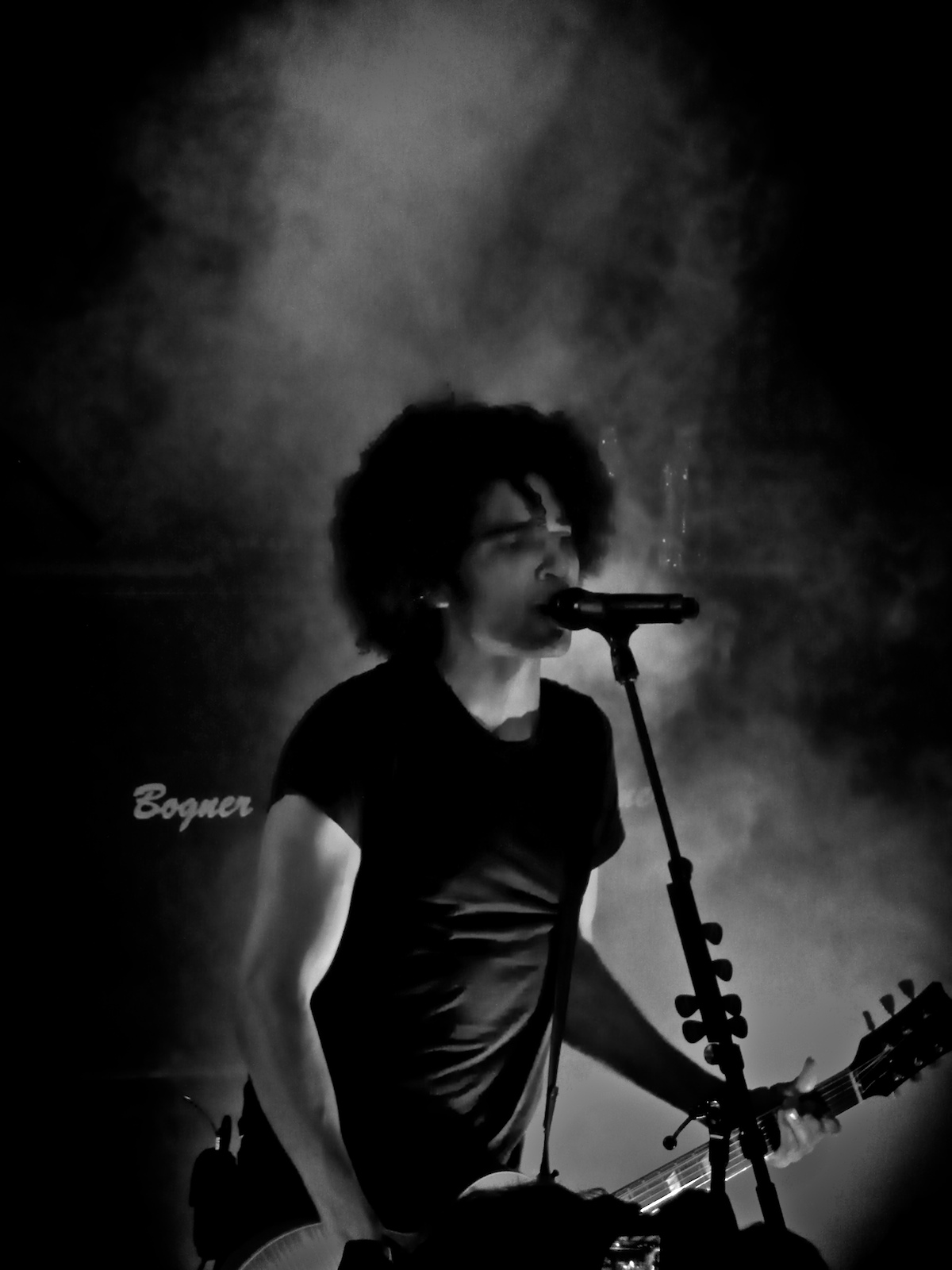
Black Gives Way to Blue is the band's first album to feature William DuVall (pictured).

=== The band's original run and aftermath ===
In the early 1990s, the American rock band Alice in Chains rose to prominence amidst a wave of interest in grunge music. Their debut album, Facelift (1990), was certified gold in the United States before peers such as Nirvana, Pearl Jam, and Soundgarden were even known to the general public. They followed with Dirt (1992), which brought the band worldwide popularity. Frontman Layne Staley developed a heroin addiction over that time which continually hampered the band's ability to perform live; eventually, this led to the band completely ceasing performances after their third studio album, a self-titled album released in 1995. Although several new songs were recorded for a greatest hits compilation titled Nothing Safe: Best of the Box in 1998, the band's future remained uncertain. In 2002, Layne Staley was found dead from a drug overdose, and the band effectively ceased to exist.

The remaining members of Alice in Chains decided to pursue their own projects. Guitarist Jerry Cantrell was already focused on his second solo album, Degradation Trip (2002), and toured with members of Comes with the Fall to support it. Drummer Sean Kinney and former Queensrÿche guitarist Chris DeGarmo formed the band Spys4Darwin, releasing the EP Microfish. Bassist Mike Inez was considered as a possible replacement for Metallica's Jason Newsted, who had departed that band in 2001, but the vacant position eventually went to Robert Trujillo, and Inez instead joined the rock band Heart. In 2004, Sony BMG terminated the band's 15-year-old contract with Columbia Records, citing that the band had ceased performing as Alice in Chains.

=== Reunion ===
On December 26, 2004, a few months after the band's termination, the largest underwater earthquake in modern history occurred in the Indian Ocean off the coast of northern Indonesia, resulting in a devastating tsunami which killed over 200,000 people. This spurred Kinney to organize a benefit concert in Seattle to support the victims, and he invited the former members of Alice in Chains to take part in it. This became the first in a series of what Kinney called "little steps" toward renewed activity for the band. The show took place on February 18, 2005, and it was the band's first live performance since 1996.

On March 10, 2006, the surviving members performed at VH1's Decades Rock Live! concert, honoring fellow Seattle musicians Ann and Nancy Wilson of Heart. Vocalist William DuVall made his first public performance with the band during that show, singing Alice in Chains' "Rooster". The band followed the concert with a short United States club tour, several festival dates in Europe, and a brief tour in Japan. DuVall joined Alice in Chains as lead singer during the band's reunion concerts. DuVall was an old friend of Cantrell's. They met in Los Angeles in 2000 through a mutual acquaintance, and Comes with the Fall was both the opening act and also Cantrell's backing band during the tour for his second solo album, Degradation Trip, in 2001 and 2002.

Kinney mentioned in a February 2006 interview that he would be interested in writing new material, but not as Alice in Chains. He explained, "If we found some other dude, I'd love to move on, write some cool tunes and change the name and go on like that. I don't see continuing as Alice and replacing somebody. ... We're not trying to replace Layne. We want to play these songs one more time, and if it seems like the right thing to do, it'll happen. I don't know how long it will go or where it will take us. It's kind of a tribute to Layne and our fans, the people who love these songs. It's not some 'I'm broke and I need the money' situation. We love playing together." Later in that same interview, Cantrell stated, "We want to celebrate what we did and the memory of our friend. We have played with some [singers] who can actually bring it and add their own thing to it without being a Layne clone. We're not interested in stepping on [Staley's] rich legacy. [...] Do you take the Led Zeppelin approach and never play again, because the guy was that important? [...] Or, do you give it a shot, try something? We're willing to take a chance on it."

== Recording ==
In April 2007, the band's "official blogger", Baldy, posted an update on progress towards the writing of the album, saying that Alice in Chains had been in Los Angeles, California for five days, "sat through three rehearsals and one demo recording session, listened to several other demos" and the new material was "kicking his ass right out of his pants." By March 2008, the band started writing and working together, and that was the start of the new album. According to Kinney, they just wanted to hear what their new music sounded like, as they were at Carmen Miranda's old studio, so they decided to record it. "It’s a very musical place. And everything was so good we decided to record it. It's a tremendous undertaking, but at the end of it I haven’t felt this good about something since we were kids". In September 2008, it was reported that Alice in Chains would enter the studio that October to begin recording a new album for a summer 2009 release.

Recording began on October 23, 2008 at the Foo Fighters' Studio 606 in Northridge, California, with producer Nick Raskulinecz (Foo Fighters, Rush, Stone Sour, Trivium, Shadows Fall, Death Angel). The band did not have a record label at the time and the album was funded by Jerry Cantrell and Sean Kinney. In December 2008, they moved into the Henson Recording Studios in Los Angeles. Staley's mother, Nancy McCallum, was supportive of the band's decision to move on and visited them during their recording sessions. Other members of Staley's family were also supportive of the band. Manager Susan Silver said "it was really important that it was OK with them". In April 2009, Cantrell told at the Revolver's Golden Gods Awards Show that Alice in Chains had finished recording the album on March 18, 2009 (his 43rd birthday and also the same day that William DuVall's son was born), and were in the process of mixing it for a September release. Elton John recorded the piano track for the song "Black Gives Way to Blue" in a Las Vegas studio on April 23, 2009.

Manager David Benveniste began approaching record labels with a sampling of four or five songs from the new sessions, and the offers started coming from every major label. The band eventually signed with Virgin/EMI.

== Music and lyrics ==
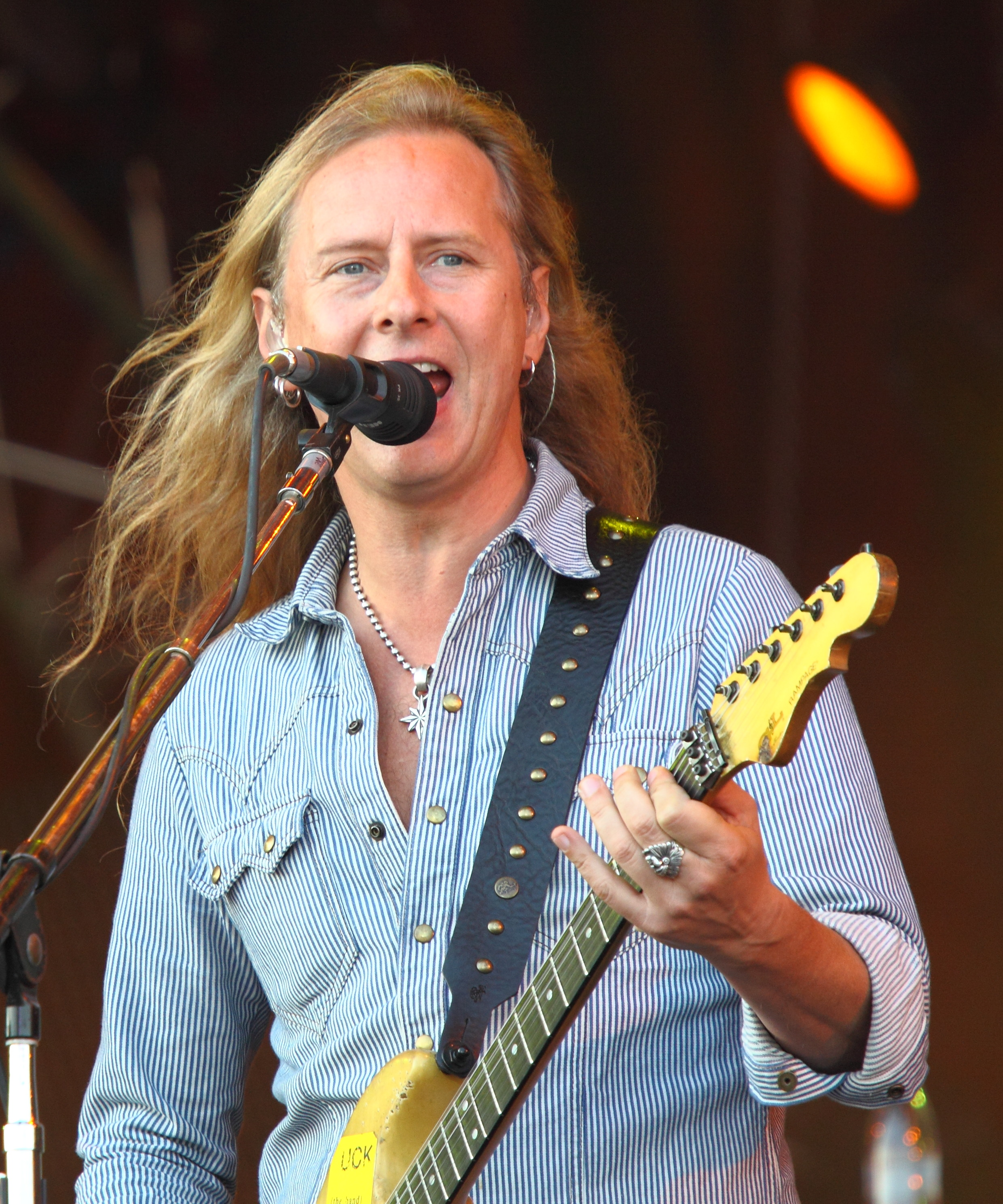
Jerry Cantrell sings lead vocals on most of the songs from Black Gives Way to Blue.

In April 2009, a blog post from the band expressed the hope that "these songs will strike a chord and make a similar impact on all of you out there that were moved by this band in the first place." Kinney said that the music on the album doesn't deviate too far from the band's past music, adding, "It's nice to sound like yourself...It's not really that hard, actually. I know people are blown away that we really sound like ourselves, and I understand the apprehension, but it's not really that big a stretch to sound the way that you sound." There are hard rock as well as acoustic songs featured on the album.

Kinney said that there are lyrics on the album that deal with original vocalist Layne Staley. He elaborated, "There's not a day that goes by that I don't think of him. And there's a lot to address, with all of that stuff coming to the forefront. A lot has happened since 1995; a lot has happened in our lives and we've never talked about it or discussed it publicly. So some of that is what's addressed here. That's the way we operate, it's about what really happened in life. We're not really the fast cars and chicks songs. It's basically what's happened in life, but a lot has happened since the last record. And it's on this record."

The title track, "Black Gives Way to Blue", was written as a tribute to Staley and features Cantrell on lead vocals and Elton John on piano. Regarding the lyrics to other specific songs, Cantrell said the first single from the album, "A Looking in View", "basically speaks to any number of things that keep you balled up inside." The second single, "Check My Brain", features lyrics dealing with Cantrell's move from Seattle to Los Angeles in 2003. The third single, "Your Decision", contains lyrics about "surviving pain and choosing to live." Cantrell also denied a popular misconception that the song "Private Hell" is about Layne Staley, but about himself breaking up with a girl that he loved a lot and he "wasn't man enough to go through with it", although he conceded that there are a lot of things in the song that aren't specifically about that and other people can relate to.

"Last of My Kind" is the only song in the album that features William DuVall singing lead vocals without harmonizing with Cantrell, who only sings back up vocals in the song. DuVall also wrote the lyrics and the melody of the song.

Cantrell said about singing lead vocals in the album:

I had to step up quite a bit more than I ever had. He [Layne Staley] always gave me a lot of confidence to do that, to sing more lead. And you can hear that as the albums progress, I kind of start growing into that role. I attribute a lot of that to the confidence that Layne gave me. Basically, him just saying, ‘Dude, you gotta fucking sing. These songs are your songs, you write all this fucking great material, and it’s not like I don’t like singing ‘em or whatever, but they’re personal to you, you should fucking sing ‘em.’ (laughs) ‘You can do it.’ I’m always forever grateful to him for that. And having some experience touring on my own and doing that, it’s kind of a natural progression to take on a larger role on this record and this incarnation of the band. The cool thing about that is I have William to work together with, and that’s a lot like the band worked together before.

== Title ==
When Chris Cornell and Susan Silver's then 9-year-old daughter Lily Cornell Silver asked her mother "what does Black Gives Way to Blue mean?", Silver suggested they call her uncle Jerry [Cantrell] and ask him, and Cantrell explained to her:

Sometimes there are very dark and challenging times in life and it may seem like things will never get better. But if you stay strong and keep moving forward and look out on the horizon, you'll start to see a little point of light way out there. And slowly, the black would give way to blue.

On December 1, 2020, Cornell Silver made her musical debut performing the song along with Chris DeGarmo at the MoPOP Founders Award tribute to Alice in Chains following an introduction by her mother.

== Artwork ==
The album cover art features an anatomical illustration of a heart surrounded by a black and blue background. The illustration was made by British designer Matt Taylor. According to William DuVall, the cover was Sean Kinney's basic concept, but the other members also had a hand in it. Photos of the band taken by photographer James Minchin III and illustrations designed by Emmanuel Polanco complete the booklet.

Jerry Cantrell explained the album cover in an interview with Billboard in October 2009:

The whole thing with the heart... there wasn't a real intention or a reason. It's just a collection of ideas that we put together. To me, we had our hearts broken by losing Layne and losing ourselves. And also it took a lot of that to get through this process and to even take the chance, and to stand-up and risk. It celebrates his life.

Staley's bandmates also thanked him in the album's liner notes.

Guitar manufacturer G&L made a custom Rampage guitar for Cantrell with the artwork for the album cover on the body. The guitar was unveiled in January 2010 on the G&L booth at the NAMM Show in Anaheim, California.

For the opening of their concerts on the Black Gives Way to Blue tour, Alice in Chains used to project the album cover with a heart beating onto the stage's curtain before the band hit the stage.

== Promotion ==
To help promote the album, on September 17, 2009, Alice in Chains released an EPK featuring all four of the members being interviewed while the Kiss makeup is being applied on them.

An app for iPhone was released on October 27, 2009, featuring audio streaming of three songs from the album ("Check My Brain", "A Looking In View" and "Acid Bubble"), the music videos for "Check My Brain" and "A Looking In View", breaking news, photos, tour dates, band bio, discography, fan wall for commenting and access to Alice In Chains merchandise, tickets, web site and band mailing list.

== Singles ==
On June 30, 2009, one of the songs from the album, "A Looking in View", was made available for purchase via iTunes and Amazon, and for a limited time it was available as a free download through the official Alice in Chains website in early July. Although it wasn't the album's first radio single, Rock stations across the U.S. started playing the song. The music video for "A Looking in View" debuted via Alice in Chains' official website on July 7, 2009.

"Check My Brain" was released to radio stations as the first official single from the album on August 14, 2009, and was made available for purchase on August 17, 2009. The music video for "Check My Brain" premiered on September 14, 2009.

"A Looking in View" peaked at number 12 on the Billboard Hot Mainstream Rock Tracks chart and at number 27 on the Billboard Rock Songs chart, while "Check My Brain" peaked at number 92 on the Billboard Hot 100, at number 75 on the Hot 100 Airplay chart, at number one on the Billboard Hot Mainstream Rock Tracks, and Billboard Rock Songs charts, and at number one on the Billboard Alternative Songs chart.

To coincide with the band's European tour, Alice in Chains released its next single, "Your Decision", on November 16, 2009 in the UK, and in the US on December 1. The album's third single debuted on the US Rock Songs chart at number 32, and charted at number 1 on the US Rock Songs, at number 1 on the US Hot Mainstream Rock Tracks and at number 4 on the US Alternative Songs charts.

The third and last single, "Lesson Learned", went to radio on June 22, 2010, and reached number 1 on the US Hot Mainstream Rock Tracks. The music video for the song premiered on Yahoo! Music on September 22, 2010.

== Release and reception ==
Professional ratings
Aggregate scores
Source	Rating
Metacritic	69/100
Review scores
Source	Rating
AllMusic	4/5 stars
The Aquarian Weekly	A−
Blabbermouth.net	8.5/10
Drowned in Sound	7/10
Kerrang!	5/5 stars
Melodic	4.5/5 stars
Metal Hammer	10/10
Rolling Stone	2.5/5 stars
The Skinny	4/5 stars
Stuff.co.nz	4/4 stars

On April 25, 2009, it was reported that the new Alice in Chains album would be released on their new label Virgin/EMI, making it the band's first label change in their 20-plus year career. On June 11, 2009, it was announced that the new album would be titled Black Gives Way to Blue and the release date was scheduled for September 29, 2009, the same day that Alice in Chains' second album, Dirt, was released in 1992.

Alice in Chains revealed their new album publicly at a listening party on July 14, 2009 at the Ricardo Montalbán Theater in Los Angeles. They played the entire LP over the PA system and performed an acoustic set including versions of songs "Your Decision" and "Black Gives Way to Blue". Keyboardist Derek Sherinian guested with the band on this event. Another listening event took place on July 21, 2009 in New York.

The UK magazine Classic Rock awarded the album nine out of ten stars in its review section in September 2009. Metal Hammer awarded the album 10/10 in September, while Nigel Britto of The Times of India lauded the album as a "stunner" and described it as a "huge, huge success".

Black Gives Way to Blue was voted number 2 on Kerrang!'s Top 20 albums of 2009 list, and on Metal Hammer's Top 50 albums of the year list, and number 7 on Kerrang's 50 Best Albums From 2009. The album won the 2010 Revolver magazine Golden Gods Award in the category Album of the Year, beating out Slayer, Mastodon, Megadeth and Heaven and Hell. In 2024, Loudwire staff elected it as the best hard rock album of 2009.

== Commercial performance ==
Black Gives Way to Blue debuted at number 5 on the Billboard 200, selling 126,000 copies in its first week, and entered the UK Albums Chart at number 19 on October 5, 2009.

The track "A Looking in View" was the first song from the album that was made available for purchase via digital download in June 2009, and despite not being the first official radio single, Rock stations started playing the song and it peaked at No. 12 on Billboard's Mainstream Rock Tracks chart. The singles "Check My Brain" and "Your Decision" reached No. 1 on the Mainstream Rock Tracks chart, while "Lesson Learned" reached No. 4. "Check My Brain" was also the band's first No. 1 song on the Alternative Songs chart, and on the Hot Rock Songs chart, and it also reached No. 92 on Billboard's Hot 100, becoming the band's first single to appear on the chart.

Black Gives Way to Blue received Gold certification by the Canadian Recording Industry Association in February 2010, signifying sales of over 40,000 units. The album was certified Gold by the RIAA, in May 2010, selling over 500,000 copies in the U.S.

== Awards ==
Revolver Golden Gods Awards Awards for Black Gives Way to Blue
Year	Nominee / work	Award	Result
2010	Black Gives Way to Blue	Album of the Year	Won

Grammy Awards nominations for Black Gives Way to Blue
Year	Nominee / work	Award	Result
2010	"Check My Brain"	Best Hard Rock Performance	Nominated
2011	"A Looking in View"	Best Hard Rock Performance	Nominated

Metal Storm Awards nominations for Black Gives Way to Blue
Year	Nominee / work	Award	Result
2009	Black Gives Way to Blue	Best Alternative Metal Album	Nominated
2009	Black Gives Way to Blue	Biggest Surprise	Nominated

== Music videos ==
More music videos have been released in support of Black Gives Way to Blue than for any previous Alice in Chains release. Videos were released for "A Looking in View", "Check My Brain", "Your Decision", "Acid Bubble" (which was made available as an interactive video on the band's website), "Last of My Kind" and "Lesson Learned". Three of the videos ("A Looking in View", "Acid Bubble", and "Lesson Learned") do not feature the band in any way, which is a first (the music video for "Get Born Again" featured glimpses of the band with images used from previous videos).

An official video for "Private Hell" was published on Alice in Chains' official YouTube channel on September 27, 2019, to celebrate the 10th anniversary of Black Gives Way to Blue. The video features behind the scenes footage of the band on studio recording the album between December 2008 and January 2009.

== Track listing ==
All tracks are written by Jerry Cantrell, except where noted.

No.	Title	Writer(s)	Length
1.	"All Secrets Known"		4:42
2.	"Check My Brain"		3:57
3.	"Last of My Kind"	Cantrell; William DuVall	5:52
4.	"Your Decision"		4:43
5.	"A Looking in View"	Cantrell; DuVall; Sean Kinney; Mike Inez	7:06
6.	"When the Sun Rose Again"		4:00
7.	"Acid Bubble"		6:55
8.	"Lesson Learned"		4:16
9.	"Take Her Out"		4:00
10.	"Private Hell"		5:38
11.	"Black Gives Way to Blue"		3:03
Total length:			54:12

Japanese edition bonus track
No.	Title	Length
12.	"Down in a Hole" (Live at the Ricardo Montalbán Theatre, 7 July 2009)	6:46
Total length:		60:56

iTunes edition bonus tracks
No.	Title	Length
12.	"Black Gives Way to Blue" (Piano Mix)	3:01
13.	"Your Decision" (Live)	4:48
Total length:		62:01

== Personnel ==
Alice in Chains

- Jerry Cantrell – lead and backing vocals, lead guitar
- William DuVall – co-lead and backing vocals, rhythm guitar, lead vocals on "Last of My Kind"
- Mike Inez – bass guitar
- Sean Kinney – drums, percussion

Additional performers

- Elton John – piano on "Black Gives Way to Blue"
- Lisa Coleman – vibraphone on "Black Gives Way to Blue"
- Chris Armstrong – tablas on "When the Sun Rose Again"
- Stevie Blacke – string arrangement, performance, and engineering on "Your Decision" and "Private Hell"

Production and design

- Alice in Chains – production, art direction
- Nick Raskulinecz – production, additional engineering
- Paul Figueroa – recording
- John Lousteau – assistant engineering
- Martin Cooke – assistant engineering
- Kevin Mills – assistant engineering
- Randy Staub – mixing
- Ted Jensen – mastering
- Matt Taylor – art direction, artwork, design
- James Minchin III – band photography
- Rocky Schenck – package interior photography
- Emmanuel Polanco – illustrations (pages 7 and 11)

== Charts ==
=== Weekly charts ===
Weekly chart performance for Black Gives Way to Blue
Chart (2009)	Peak position
Australian Albums (ARIA)	12
Austrian Albums (Ö3 Austria)	14
Belgian Albums (Ultratop Flanders)	26
Belgian Albums (Ultratop Wallonia)	31
Canadian Albums (Billboard)	4
Danish Albums (Hitlisten)	13
Dutch Albums (Album Top 100)	34
Finnish Albums (Suomen virallinen lista)	11
French Albums (SNEP)	46
German Albums (Offizielle Top 100)	21
Italian Albums (FIMI)	32
Mexican Albums (Top 100 Mexico)	88
New Zealand Albums (RMNZ)	7
Norwegian Albums (VG-lista)	9
Polish Albums (ZPAV)	16
Scottish Albums (Official Charts)	20
Spanish Albums (Promusicae)	54
Swedish Albums (Sverigetopplistan)	20
Swiss Albums (Schweizer Hitparade)	21
UK Albums (Official Charts)	19
UK Rock & Metal Albums (Official Charts)	3
US Billboard 200	5
US Top Alternative Albums (Billboard)	3
US Top Rock Albums (Billboard)	3
US Top Hard Rock Albums (Billboard)	2

=== Year-end charts ===
2009 year-end chart performance for Black Gives Way to Blue
Chart (2009)	Position
US Billboard 200	136
US Top Rock Albums (Billboard)	34

2010 year-end chart performance for Black Gives Way to Blue
Chart (2010)	Position
US Billboard 200	174
US Top Rock Albums (Billboard)	46

== Certifications ==
Certifications for Black Gives Way to Blue
Region	Certification	Certified units/sales
Canada (Music Canada)	Gold	40,000^{^}
United States (RIAA)	Gold	500,000^{^}
^{^} Shipments figures based on certification alone.
