= Dirt (Alice in Chains album) =

Studio album by Alice in Chains
- Released: September 29, 1992
- Recorded: April–July 1992
- Studios: Eldorado (Burbank); London Bridge (Seattle); One on One (Los Angeles)
- Genres: Grunge; alternative metal; heavy metal; hard rock
- Length: 57:37
- Label: Columbia
- Producers: Dave Jerden; Rick Parashar; Alice in Chains

Alice in Chains chronology
Sap (1992)	Dirt (1992)	Jar of Flies (1994)

Singles from Dirt
- 1. "Would?" Released: June 8, 1992; 2. "Them Bones" Released: September 14, 1992; 3. "Angry Chair" Released: November 30, 1992; 4. "Rooster" Released: February 22, 1993; 5. "Down in a Hole" Released: September 14, 1993

Dirt is the second studio album by the American rock band Alice in Chains, released on September 29, 1992, by Columbia Records. It was the band's last album recorded with all four original members, as bassist Mike Starr was fired in January 1993 during the tour to support the album. Predominantly produced by the band and Dave Jerden, the majority of the songs were written by guitarist Jerry Cantrell, but for the first time, vocalist Layne Staley wrote two songs by himself ("Hate to Feel" and "Angry Chair"), featuring himself on guitar. The track "Iron Gland" features Tom Araya from Slayer on vocals. The album's lyrics explore depression, pain, anger, anti-social behavior, relationships, drug addiction (primarily heroin), war, death, and other emotionally charged topics.

Dirt received critical acclaim and charted in Australia, Canada, the Netherlands, Finland, Germany, New Zealand, Norway, Sweden, and the United Kingdom. In the US, it peaked at number 6 on the Billboard 200 chart. The album spawned five singles: "Would?", "Them Bones", "Angry Chair", "Rooster", and "Down in a Hole", all with accompanying music videos. Dirt was nominated for the Grammy Award for Best Hard Rock Performance. It is certified 5× platinum by the Recording Industry Association of America (RIAA), making it Alice in Chains' most commercially successful album.

Dirt is often considered a landmark album of the grunge era and been included in numerous best album lists. According to a writer of Pitchfork, the album made Alice in Chains "one of the most famous bands in the world". In 2022, the album returned to the Top 10 of the Billboard 200 chart at number 9 following the release of its 30th anniversary reissue.

== Background ==
Alice in Chains released their debut album, Facelift, in August 1990 through Columbia Records. Inspired by the music of Black Sabbath, Deep Purple, and Motörhead, the album was initially unsuccessful; the band's first live performances were local shows and festivals around Seattle. Their first tour came as a supporting act to Extreme for a month. Extreme themselves had yet to reach fame and were also touring for the first time; neither band drew well. Alice in Chains followed with an opening slot on a tour with Iggy Pop in November 1990, but the band was similarly received with indifference. Their fortunes began to turn when the video for their breakout single, "Man in the Box", landed regular rotation on MTV, beating Blue Murder for a slot on the channel's "Buzz Bin".

With newfound momentum, the group secured two supporting slots on two high-profile tours: first, they were selected to join thrash metal bands Anthrax, Megadeth, and Slayer, on the Clash of the Titans Tour in mid-1991, having replaced opening act Death Angel after the band was involved in a bus accident that left its drummer Andy Galeon critically injured and unable to perform. They were then appointed to a slot on Van Halen's For Unlawful Carnal Knowledge Tour later that year; Van Halen frontman Sammy Hagar personally selected the band. Sales of Facelift increased drastically, and by September 1991, it had been certified gold by the Recording Industry Association of America (RIAA). The video for "Man in the Box" would go on to be nominated for an MTV Video Music Award for Best Rock Video in that month, and a nomination for the Grammy Award for Grammy Award for Best Hard Rock Performance with Vocal followed a few months later. In the midst of their success, lead vocalist Layne Staley and bassist Mike Starr were both introduced to heroin during the Van Halen tour, which would go on to shape not only their personal lives but also the band's creative direction.

== Recording ==
Following the tour for Facelift, Alice in Chains entered the studio with Rick Parashar to record a song for Cameron Crowe's 1992 film Singles. The song for the film became "Would?", but the band took advantage of the recording session time to demo additional new material. About ten demos were recorded; these sessions produced the songs heard on the band's acoustic extended play, Sap (1992), and a few others which would later appear on the band's second album. The recording of Dirt began in the spring of 1992. Producer Dave Jerden, who had previously worked with the band on their debut, Facelift, wanted to work with them again. He admired Layne Staley's lyrics and voice, and Jerry Cantrell's guitar riffs. Dirt was recorded at Eldorado Recording Studios in Burbank, London Bridge Studio in Seattle, and One on One Studios in Los Angeles from April to July 1992.

Dirt was recorded during the Los Angeles riots that erupted following the acquittal of four LAPD officers caught on camera beating unarmed black motorist Rodney King. The riots started on the first day of recording. The band was watching television when the verdict for the incident was announced. Jerry Cantrell was in a store buying some beer when a man came in and started looting the place. Cantrell also got stuck in traffic and saw people pulling others out of their cars and beating them. The band tried to get out of Los Angeles without getting hurt while residents were protesting against police brutality. They took Slayer vocalist Tom Araya with them and went to the Joshua Tree desert for four or five days until things calmed down, then moved back into the studio and started recording the album.

While recording the album, Staley, who had previously checked out of rehab, quickly went back to using heroin. Staley later went cold-turkey on his own while reading The Bad Place by Dean Koontz. Jerden later said that he was told Staley felt animosity toward him dating back to the Dirt sessions due to Jerden repeatedly recommending to Staley that he get sober. Jerden said, "Apparently he got all mad at me [during the Dirt sessions] ... And what's my job as a producer? To produce a record. I'm not getting paid to be Layne's friend". Staley was not the only one who went through heavy drug use; drummer Sean Kinney and bassist Mike Starr were both struggling with alcoholism, while the latter was also addicted to heroin.

Jerden got the album's famous guitar tone by blending three different amps – a Bogner Fish preamp for the low end, a Bogner Ecstacy for the mid frequencies, and a Rockman Headphone amp for the high frequencies.

== Music and lyrics ==
With songs written primarily on the road, the material is darker than Facelift. "We did a lot of soul searching on this album. There's a lot of intense feelings." Cantrell said, "We deal with our daily demons through music. All of the poison that builds up during the day we cleanse when we play". Drug use was front and center as a lyrical theme on the album. Three tracks ("Junkhead", "God Smack", and "Hate to Feel") specifically reference heroin use and its effects.

Staley revealed that the album is semi-conceptual and that there are two basic themes in it. The first theme is about "dealing with kind of a personal anguish and turmoil, which turns into drugs to ease that pain, and being confident that that was the answer in a way. Then later on the songs start to slip down closer and closer to hell, and then he figures out that drugs were not, and are not, the way to ease that pain. Basically, it's the whole story of the last three years of my life." Staley described the other theme as being about "painful relationships and involvements with persons."

Staley later expressed regret about the lyrical content of some songs on Dirt, explaining, "I wrote about drugs, and I didn't think I was being unsafe or careless by writing about them ... I didn't want my fans to think that heroin was cool. But then I've had fans come up to me and give me the thumbs up, telling me they're high. That's exactly what I didn't want to happen."

Cantrell said in 2013: "That darkness was always part of the band, but it wasn't all about that. There was always an optimism, even in the darkest shit we wrote. With Dirt, it's not like we were saying 'Oh yeah, this is a good thing.' It was more of a warning than anything else, rather than 'Hey, come and check this out, it's great!' We were talking about what was going on at the time, but within that there was always a survivor element – a kind of triumph over the darker elements of being a human being. I still think we have all of that intact, but maybe the percentage has shifted."

Cantrell told RIP magazine in 1993 that not all of the lyrics have drug references:

I think "Sickman" is not that bad. I thought most of the hassle would come from "Junkhead" and "Godsmack". Those songs are put in sequence on the second side those five songs from "Junkhead" to "Angry Chair" for a reason: Because it tells a story. It starts out with a really young naive attitude with "Junkhead", like drugs are great, sex is great, rock'n' roll, yeah! Then, as it progresses, there's a little bit of growing up and a little bit of a realization of what it's about, and that ain't what it's about. I've been using this phrase a lot, but it makes a lot of sense: It's really easy to die; it's really hard to live. It takes a lot of guts to live. It doesn't take a lot of guts to die. Those five and "Sickman" are the only ones talking about that type of mentality [drugs]. The rest of the stuff is not like that at all. "Rain When I Die" is a song to a girl. There's a lot of stuff on it. A good portion of it is a story, and it's meant to be that way. It's kind of overwhelming and unpleasant at times, unsettling maybe, but that's why all those songs are together. Even if it's disturbing, it's not something anybody else needs to worry about or the way somebody else needs to live their life.

In the liner notes of 1999's Music Bank box set collection, Cantrell cited "Junkhead" and "God Smack" as "the most openly honest" songs about drug use.

Cantrell said he wrote "Them Bones" about "mortality, that one of these days we'll end up a pile of bones." He told RIP magazine in 1993: "'Them Bones' is pretty cut and dried. It's a little sarcastic, but it's pretty much about dealing with your mortality and life. Everybody's going to die someday. Instead of being afraid of it, that's the way it is: so enjoy the time you've got. Live as much as you can, have as much fun as possible. Face your fear and live. I had family members die at a fairly early age; so I've always had kind of a phobia about it. Death freaks me out. I think it freaks a lot of people out. It's the end of life, depending on your views. It's a pretty scary thing. "Them Bones" is trying to put that thought to rest. Use what you have left, and use it well."

Cantrell was inspired to write "Dam That River" after a fight he had with Sean Kinney, in which Kinney broke a coffee table over his head. The lyrics to "Rain When I Die" were written by Cantrell and Staley about their respective girlfriends. "Sickman" came together after Staley asked Cantrell to "write him the sickest tune, the sickest, darkest, most fucked up and heaviest thing [Cantrell] could write."

"Rooster" was written by Cantrell for his father, Jerry Cantrell Sr., who served in the Vietnam War and his childhood nickname was "Rooster". Cantrell described the song as "the start of the healing process between my Dad and I from all that damage that Vietnam caused."

Discussing the title track "Dirt", Cantrell stated that "the words Layne put to it were so heavy, I've never given him something and not thought it was gonna be the most bad-assed thing I was going to hear." Staley said he wrote the song "to a certain person who basically buried my ass".

The 43-second "Iron Gland" was developed out of a guitar riff that Cantrell would play that annoyed the other band members, so he created the song (adding in a reference to Black Sabbath's "Iron Man") and promised to never play the guitar riff again. It features Tom Araya of thrash metal band Slayer on vocals, as well as Layne Staley. "Hate to Feel" and "Angry Chair" were both composed solely by Staley, who also played guitar on both tracks, and Cantrell has expressed his pride in seeing Staley grow as a songwriter and guitarist.

"Down in a Hole" was written by Cantrell to his long-time girlfriend, Courtney Clarke. Cantrell explained the song in the liner notes of 1999's Music Bank box set: "["Down in a Hole"]'s in my top three, personally. It's to my long-time love. It's the reality of my life, the path I've chosen and in a weird way it kind of foretold where we are right now. It's hard for us to both understand... that this life is not conducive to much success with long-term relationships."

The album's final track, "Would?", was written by Cantrell as a tribute to his friend and late lead singer of Mother Love Bone, Andrew Wood, who died of a drug overdose in 1990. Cantrell said the song is also "directed towards people who pass judgments."

== Outtakes ==
The songs "Fear the Voices" and "Lying Season" were featured on Alice in Chains' 1991 demo tape that featured songs from Sap and Dirt. Both of these songs were later included on the band's 1999 box set, Music Bank. "Fear the Voices" was released as a single in 1999 to promote Music Bank and became a radio hit that same year. Regarding the two songs, Cantrell said that they came from a time when the band was still developing its sound.

== Packaging and title ==
The album's cover art features a nude woman half-buried in a cracked desert landscape. The cover was photographed by Rocky Schenck, who created the image along with the album's art director, Mary Maurer. The cover was conceptualized by the band, with the woman being either dead or alive. The band discussed the type of woman they wanted and Schenck began casting shortly after. Schenck submitted a photo of model/actress Mariah O'Brien and the band chose her.

The cover shoot took place at Schenck's Hollywood studio on June 14, 1992, with the supervision of drummer Sean Kinney. After the eight hour photo session, O'Brien went to the bathroom and left her wig embedded in the dirt. Schenck then snapped a few photos, which were later used for the 1999 box set Music Bank.

For many years, fans believed that the model on the cover was Staley's then-girlfriend, Demri Lara Parrott, but Schenck revealed to Revolver Magazine in 2011 that the girl was actually Mariah O'Brien, with whom he had previously worked on the cover of Spinal Tap's single "Bitch School". The magazine also published behind the scenes photos from the shoot featuring O'Brien. Schenck told Revolver Magazine:

Everyone always asks if that is Demri Parrott on the Dirt Cover. I think Demri's name might have been mentioned as a possible model once or twice, but it was never a serious consideration.

In an interview with the Canadian magazine M.E.A.T. in December 1992, Layne Staley said about the cover:

This album cover... I like to refer to it as "revenge". The song 'Dirt' was written to a certain person who basically buried my ass, so the woman on the album cover is kinda the portrayal of that person being sucked down into the dirt (laughs), instead of me. The picture is the spitting image of her, and that wasn't even planned. Actually, I was pretty angry about it when I first saw it – she's not happy about it either (laughs). It was real eerie.

The cover was referenced on the music video for Alice in Chains' 2009 single "A Looking in View". At the 6:55 mark of the video, a woman (played by Sacha Senisch) is seen lying on a cracked desert floor similarly to Dirt's cover. "A Looking in View" was featured on Alice in Chains' fourth studio album, Black Gives Way to Blue, released exactly 17 years after Dirt, on September 29, 2009.

== Release and commercial performance ==
Upon its release in September 1992, Dirt peaked at number six on the Billboard 200 and charted for 102 weeks, ending at number 196 in the week of September 24, 1994. Dirt granted Alice in Chains international recognition, and the album was certified 5× platinum in the United States, platinum in Canada and gold in the UK. The album had sold 3,358,000 copies in the United States as of 2008. It is the band's most commercially successful album. A remastered reissue of the album was released on vinyl on November 23, 2009. Dirt included the top-30 singles "Would?", "Them Bones", "Angry Chair", "Rooster", and "Down in a Hole", all of which had accompanying music videos.

The album returned to the top 10 of the Billboard 200 chart at No. 9 following the release of its 30th anniversary reissue on September 23, 2022.

== Reception and legacy ==
Professional ratings
Contemporary reviews
Review scores
Source	Rating
Chicago Tribune	4/4 stars
Entertainment Weekly	A
Kerrang!	5/5
Los Angeles Times	1.5/4 stars
NME	2/10
The Philadelphia Inquirer	3/4 stars
Q	2/5 stars
Select	3/5 medals
Vox	8/10

Professional ratings
Retrospective reviews
Review scores
Source	Rating
AllMusic	5/5 stars
The Encyclopedia of Popular Music	4/5 stars
The Great Rock Discography	8/10
MusicHound Rock	3/5 stars
Music Story	4.5/5 stars
Pitchfork	8.7/10
Q	4/5 stars
The Rolling Stone Album Guide	4.5/5 stars
Spin Alternative Record Guide	7/10
Sputnikmusic	5/5

Dirt received critical acclaim, and is considered by many critics and fans alike as the group's magnum opus. In a retrospective review, Steve Huey of AllMusic said "Dirt is Alice in Chains' major artistic statement and the closest they ever came to recording a flat-out masterpiece. It's a primal, sickening howl from the depths of Layne Staley's heroin addiction, and one of the most harrowing concept albums ever recorded. Not every song on Dirt is explicitly about heroin, but Jerry Cantrell's solo-written contributions (nearly half the album) effectively maintain the thematic coherence—nearly every song is imbued with the morbidity, self-disgust, and/or resignation of a self-aware yet powerless addict."

Michael Christopher of PopMatters praised the album, stating, "The record wasn't celebratory by any means—but you'll be hard-pressed to find a more brutally truthful work laid down—and that's why it will always be one of the greatest records ever made." Chris Gill of Guitar World described Dirt as "huge and foreboding, yet eerie and intimate," as well as "sublimely dark and brutally honest." Don Kaye of Kerrang! described Dirt as "an unflinching, brutally truthful and, yes, fiercely rocking testimonial to human endurance." A writer for Pitchfork noted that the album made Alice in Chains "one of the most famous bands in the world."

At the 1993 Grammy Awards, Dirt received a nomination for Best Hard Rock Performance. The band also contributed the song "Would?" to the soundtrack for the 1992 Cameron Crowe film Singles, whose video received an award for Best Video from a Film at the 1993 MTV Video Music Awards. Dirt is often considered as one of the most influential albums to the sludge metal subgenre, which fuses doom metal with hardcore punk. It was voted "Kerrang! Critic's Choice Album of the Year" for 1992.

Dirt was also included in the 2005 book 1001 Albums You Must Hear Before You Die. In 2008, Dirt was ranked as the fifth best album released in the previous two decades by Close-Up magazine. In 2011, Joe Robinson of Loudwire named Dirt as one of the best metal albums of the 1990s, alongside other albums such as Megadeth's Rust in Peace and Tool's Ænima, writing "In the battle between metal and grunge, Alice in Chains are a rare band that is embraced by fans of both genres. The most metal of the Seattle bands, they were marketed as metal for 1990's 'Facelift,' then touted as grunge for 1992's 'Dirt.' The band members themselves didn't bother much with labels, they just churned out some of the finest alt-metal with classics like 'Would?,' 'Rooster' and 'Them Bones' leading their charge all the way to the headlining spot on Lollapalooza '93." In October 2011, the album was ranked number one on Guitar World magazine's top ten list of guitar albums of 1992, with The Offspring's Ignition in second place and Bad Religion's Generator in third place. In June 2017, Dirt was ranked at No. 26 on Rolling Stone's list of the "100 Greatest Metal Albums of All Time". In April 2019, Rolling Stone ranked the album at No. 6 on its list of the "50 Greatest Grunge Albums". In 2024, Loudwire staff elected it as the best hard rock album of 1992. In 2025, Em Casalena of American Songwriter included the album in the site's list of "4 Grunge Albums That Are Way Better Than Nevermind".

== Tour ==
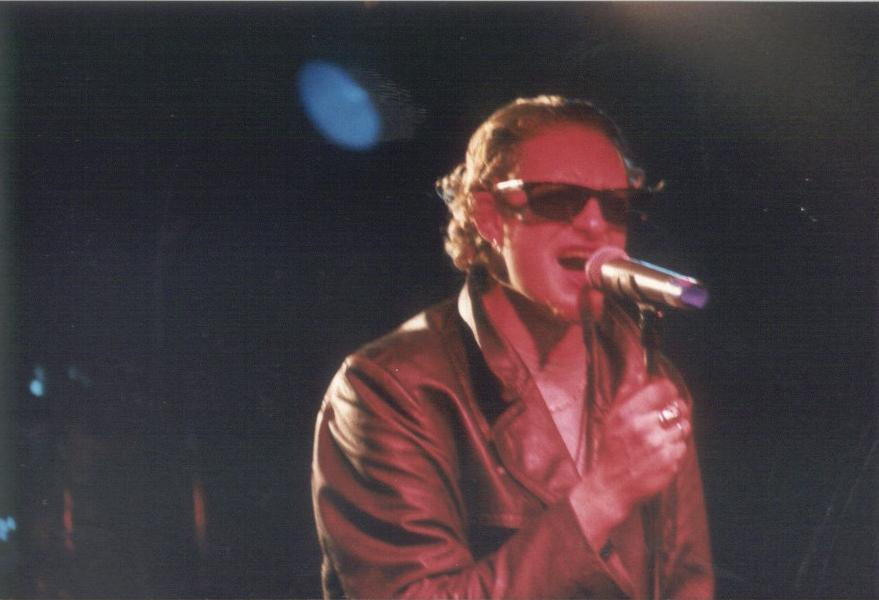
Staley performing with Alice in Chains in Boston in 1992

Alice in Chains were added as openers to Ozzy Osbourne's No More Tours tour. Days before the tour began, Staley broke his foot in an ATV accident, forcing him to use crutches on stage. During the tour, Starr was fired following the Hollywood Rock concert in Rio de Janeiro on January 22, 1993, and was replaced by former Ozzy Osbourne bassist Mike Inez.

During June–August 1993, Alice in Chains joined Primus, Tool, Rage Against the Machine and Babes in Toyland for the alternative rock festival Lollapalooza, which was the last major tour the band played with Staley.

== Track listing ==
"Sickman", "Junkhead", "Dirt" and "God Smack" are credited to Cantrell/Staley with no specification for lyrics or music. "Rain When I Die" is credited to Cantrell/Staley/Kinney/Starr, and it was later stated that Cantrell and Staley wrote the lyrics.

No.	Title	Writer(s)	Length
1.	"Them Bones"	Jerry Cantrell	2:30
2.	"Dam That River"	Cantrell	3:09
3.	"Rain When I Die"	Cantrell; Layne Staley; Sean Kinney; Mike Starr	6:01
4.	"Down in a Hole^{[I]}"	Cantrell	5:38
5.	"Sickman"	Cantrell; Staley	5:29
6.	"Rooster"	Cantrell	6:15
7.	"Junkhead"	Cantrell; Staley	5:09
8.	"Dirt"	Cantrell; Staley	5:16
9.	"God Smack"	Cantrell; Staley	3:56
10.	"Intro (Dream Sequence)/Iron Gland^{[II]}" (sometimes unlisted or listed as "Untitled")	Cantrell	0:43
11.	"Hate to Feel"	Staley	5:15
12.	"Angry Chair"	Staley	4:48
13.	"Would?"	Cantrell	3:28
Total length:			57:37

Notes

- 1 On early U.S. and Canadian pressings, "Down in a Hole" appeared as track 12 placed between "Angry Chair" and "Would?". Current U.S. and Canadian editions of the CD and the Vinyl have "Down in a Hole" as the fourth track, located between "Rain When I Die" and "Sickman", which was the track listing that the band originally intended before the record company changed the order.
- 2 Track 9 or 10, "Iron Gland", appears without a title on the album. The title appeared on the compilations Nothing Safe and Music Bank. The iTunes Store lists it incorrectly as "Iron Man". Before the name "Iron Gland" was revealed, it was labeled in some online databases as "Intro (Dream Sequence)". On editions in which "Down in a Hole" is track 4, "Iron Gland" is track 10. The track is unlisted on some versions of the album, and some editions remove the track completely or merge it with "Hate to Feel". On the back cover of the edition in which "Iron Gland" is track 9, "Hate to Feel", "Angry Chair", "Down in a Hole" and "Would?" are listed from 9–12. However, when the CD is played, the songs are on tracks 10–13.

== Personnel ==
Alice in Chains

- Layne Staley – lead and backing vocals, rhythm guitar on "Hate to Feel" and "Angry Chair"; sun logo/icons
- Jerry Cantrell – guitars, backing vocals, co-lead vocals on "Down in a Hole" and "Would?"
- Mike Starr – bass
- Sean Kinney – drums

Additional personnel

- Tom Araya – vocals on "Iron Gland"

Production

- Alice in Chains – production
- Dave Jerden – production (except on "Would?"), mixing
- Rick Parashar – production on "Would?"
- Bryan Carlstrom – engineering
- Annette Cisneros – engineering, mixing
- Ulrich Wild – engineering
- Steve Hall – mastering
- Eddy Schreyer – mastering
- Mary Maurer – art direction, visual effects
- Doug Erb – cover design
- David Coleman – logo
- Rocky Schenck – photography

== Charts ==
=== Weekly charts ===
Chart (1992–1993)	Peak position
Australian Albums (ARIA)	13
Canada Top Albums/CDs (RPM)	25
Dutch Albums (Album Top 100)	17
Finnish Albums (Suomen virallinen lista)	11
German Albums (Offizielle Top 100)	37
New Zealand Albums (RMNZ)	36
Norwegian Albums (VG-lista)	15
Swedish Albums (Sverigetopplistan)	11
UK Albums (Official Charts)	42
US Billboard 200	6

Chart (2022–2026)	Peak position
Austrian Albums (Ö3 Austria)	62
Belgian Albums (Ultratop Flanders)	55
Belgian Albums (Ultratop Wallonia)	23
Danish Albums (Hitlisten)	27
Finnish Albums (Suomen virallinen lista)	24
German Albums (Offizielle Top 100)	25
Hungarian Physical Albums (MAHASZ)	18
Hungarian Vinyl Albums (MAHASZ)	8
Irish Albums (Official Charts)	28
Italian Albums (FIMI)	40
New Zealand Albums (RMNZ)	5
Polish Albums (ZPAV)	27
Portuguese Albums (AFP)	11
Scottish Albums (Official Charts)	7
Spanish Albums (Promusicae)	17
Swiss Albums (Schweizer Hitparade)	24
UK Albums (Official Charts)	36
UK Rock & Metal Albums (Official Charts)	1
US Billboard 200	9

=== Year-end charts ===
Chart (1993)	Position
US Billboard 200	39

== Certifications ==
Region	Certification	Certified units/sales
Australia (ARIA)	Platinum	70,000^{‡}
Canada (Music Canada)	Platinum	100,000^{^}
New Zealand (RMNZ)	Platinum	15,000^{‡}
United Kingdom (BPI)	Gold	100,000^{^}
United States (RIAA)	5× Platinum	5,000,000^{‡}
^{^} Shipments figures based on certification alone.^{‡} Sales+streaming figures based on certification alone.
