= A Looking in View =

Single by Alice in Chains

from the album Black Gives Way to Blue
- Released: June 30, 2009
- Recorded: October 23, 2008–March 18, 2009
- Studio: Studio 606 in Northridge, California
- Genre: Heavy metal; hard rock
- Length: 7:06
- Label: Virgin/EMI
- Songwriters: Jerry Cantrell, William DuVall, Sean Kinney, Mike Inez
- Producer: Nick Raskulinecz

Alice in Chains singles chronology
"Fear the Voices" (1999)	"A Looking in View" (2009)	"Check My Brain" (2009)

Music video
- "A Looking in View" on YouTube

"A Looking in View" is a song by American rock band Alice in Chains, featured on their fourth studio album, Black Gives Way to Blue (2009). It was the first publicly released song from the album and was available for purchase on June 30, 2009, and for a limited time it was available as a free download through the official Alice in Chains website. Although it was not the album's first official single, Rock stations across the U.S. started playing the song after it was made available for streaming. The first official radio single, "Check My Brain", was released in August 2009.

"A Looking in View" was Alice in Chains' first release with new vocalist William DuVall, who replaced the band's original singer, Layne Staley, in 2006. Vocalist/guitarist Jerry Cantrell shares lead vocals with DuVall. The song was the band's first release since 1999's "Fear the Voices". Clocking in at a length of seven minutes and six seconds, it is the second longest song Alice in Chains has released as a single (official or non-official), behind the MTV Unplugged version of "Over Now", as well as their fourth longest song to date, behind "Frogs" from their self-titled 1995 album, "All I Am" from their 2018 album Rainier Fog, and "Phantom Limb" from their 2013 album The Devil Put Dinosaurs Here. The song peaked at No. 12 on Billboard's Mainstream Rock chart, at No. 38 on the Alternative Songs chart, and at No. 27 on the Hot Rock Songs chart.

"A Looking in View" was nominated for a Grammy Award for Best Hard Rock Performance in 2011.

== Lyrics ==
Guitarist and vocalist Jerry Cantrell said of the song in the press release:

The song basically speaks to any number of things that keep you balled up inside. A cell of our own making with an unlocked door that we choose to remain in. Focusing our attention inward instead of reaching out to a much larger world. I think this is common to us all. It's funny how hard we fight to hang on to a bone we can't pull through a hole in the fence, or how difficult it is to put down the bag of bricks and move on.

== Release and reception ==
On June 30, 2009, "A Looking in View" was made available for purchase via iTunes and Amazon, and for a limited time it was available as a free download through the official Alice in Chains website in early July. Although it wasn't the album's first radio single, Rock stations across the U.S. started playing the song. As of mid-August 2009, it has peaked at number 12 on the Billboard Hot Mainstream Rock Tracks chart, at number 38 on the Billboard Alternative Songs chart, and at number 27 on the Billboard Hot Rock Songs chart.

The song was nominated in the 53rd Grammy Awards Ceremony in the category of "Best Hard Rock Performance".

== In popular culture ==
The song was released as downloadable content for the Rock Band and Rock Band 2 music video games for the Xbox 360, Wii, and PlayStation 3 consoles, as part of Alice In Chains Pack 01, which also includes older hits "Rooster", "Would?", and "No Excuses", along with "Check My Brain", also from Black Gives Way to Blue. It was added to the Xbox Live Marketplace and in-game Music Store for the Wii on September 29, 2009, and it was added to the PlayStation Network on October 1, 2009.

The song was also featured in the soundtrack of an ice hockey sports video game NHL 2K11.

== Music video ==
The music video for "A Looking in View" was directed by Stephen Schuster. Shooting wrapped on June 20, 2009 and the video premiered on Alice in Chains official website on July 7, 2009. It was Alice in Chains' first music video since 1999's "Get Born Again", and the first music video since 1994's "I Stay Away" that does not feature the band. It features actors Sacha Senisch, Chad Post and Devin Zephyr instead.

At the 6:55 mark of the video, a woman (played by Sacha Senisch) is seen lying on a cracked desert floor similarly to the cover art of Alice in Chains' 1992 album Dirt.

Schuster explained the music video to VideoStatic:

"'A Looking In View' is an epic track that they wanted to release virally along with a music video/short film, which was perfect since the song clocks in at a bit over 7 minutes. After sitting down with the band, it became clear that the song dealt with the idea of people really struggling and dealing with intense psychological issues, finding themselves trapped within their own heads and often solely holding the key to their own freedom. That was the basic platform I stepped off from as I started to look at all the physical and mental issues that people deal with. After all the writing and research, the video ended up being about the lives of these three individuals all locked inside rooms of their own design with a single wall separating each of them. It was more the idea that though we are all individuals and we all deal with our own screwed-up issues and disorders, there are others around us that are also dealing with their own issues. The young male (Chad Post) struggles with the obsessions of time, symmetry, arrangement, numbers, and the fear of causing harm to the person he loves. The female (Sacha Senisch) struggles with body dysmorphic disorder - the idea that she looks older or heavier than she is and the burdens that society instills within her. The older male (Devin Zephyr) is a religious zealot with struggles with the white washed lie of holiness and the lustful manifestations of his own sins. In the end, Jerry [Cantrell] and William [DuVall] really wanted to show this as a redemptive song and how, as individuals, we can find freedom from within ourselves."

== Personnel ==
- Jerry Cantrell – lead vocals, lead guitar
- William DuVall – co-lead vocals, rhythm guitar
- Mike Inez – bass
- Sean Kinney – drums

== Chart positions ==
Chart (2009)	Peak position
US Mainstream Rock (Billboard)	12
US Hot Rock & Alternative Songs (Billboard)	27
US Alternative Airplay (Billboard)	38
