= Mike Inez =

American bassist

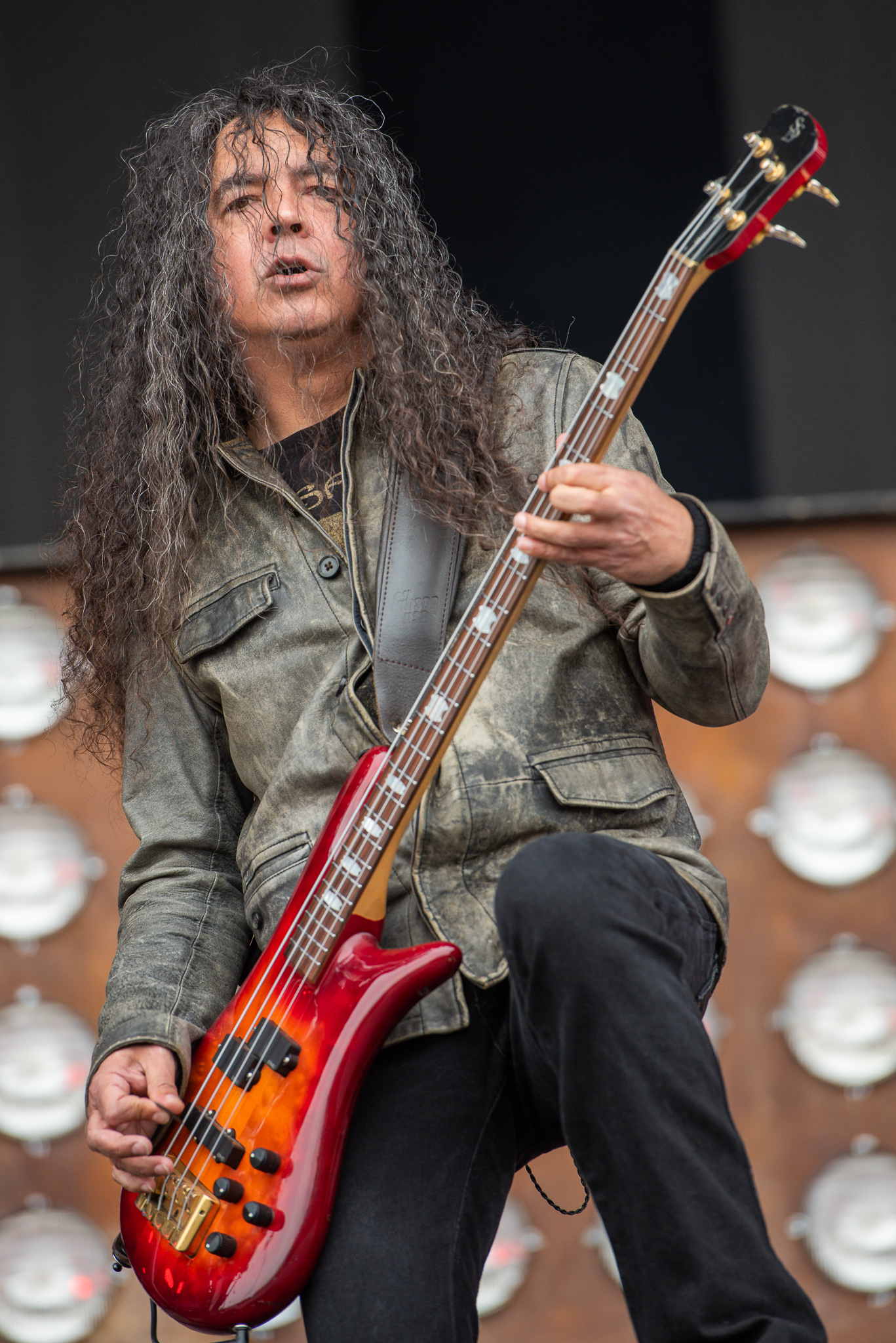
- Inez performing with Alice in Chains in 2019

Background information
- Born: Michael Allen Ines; May 14, 1966 (age 60); Los Angeles County, California, U.S.
- Genres: Grunge; alternative metal; heavy metal; hard rock
- Occupation: Musician
- Instrument: Bass guitar
- Years active: 1983–present
- Member of: Alice in Chains
- Formerly of: Ozzy Osbourne; Heart; Slash's Snakepit; Spys4Darwin; Black Label Society

Michael Allen Inez (born May 14, 1966) is an American rock musician and bassist. Since 1993, Inez has been the bassist of the American rock band Alice in Chains. He is also recognized for his work with Ozzy Osbourne from 1989 to 1993. Inez also has connections with Slash's Snakepit, Black Label Society, Spys4Darwin, and Heart. Inez has earned seven Grammy Award nominations as a member of Alice in Chains.

== Career ==
Mike Inez began his career in music by playing guitar and saxophone. Since the late 1980s, his career has consisted of the role of bass guitarist in popular hard rock bands.

=== Ozzy Osbourne (1989–1993) ===
In 1989, more than 50 musicians auditioned for Ozzy Osbourne's group; Inez, then a member of the Los Angeles band Skin on Skin, won the spot of bassist. Within a month, he was playing a live gig with Osbourne at Wembley Stadium.

Inez was an official member of Osbourne's band during their recording of the album No More Tears. However, Bob Daisley was brought in to record the bass and none of Inez's playing is on the final album. In the liner notes Inez was credited as "bass and music inspiration", as he had written the riff to the title track in a jam session. Inez also appeared on the 1993 Osbourne live album Live & Loud.

=== Alice in Chains (1993–2002) ===
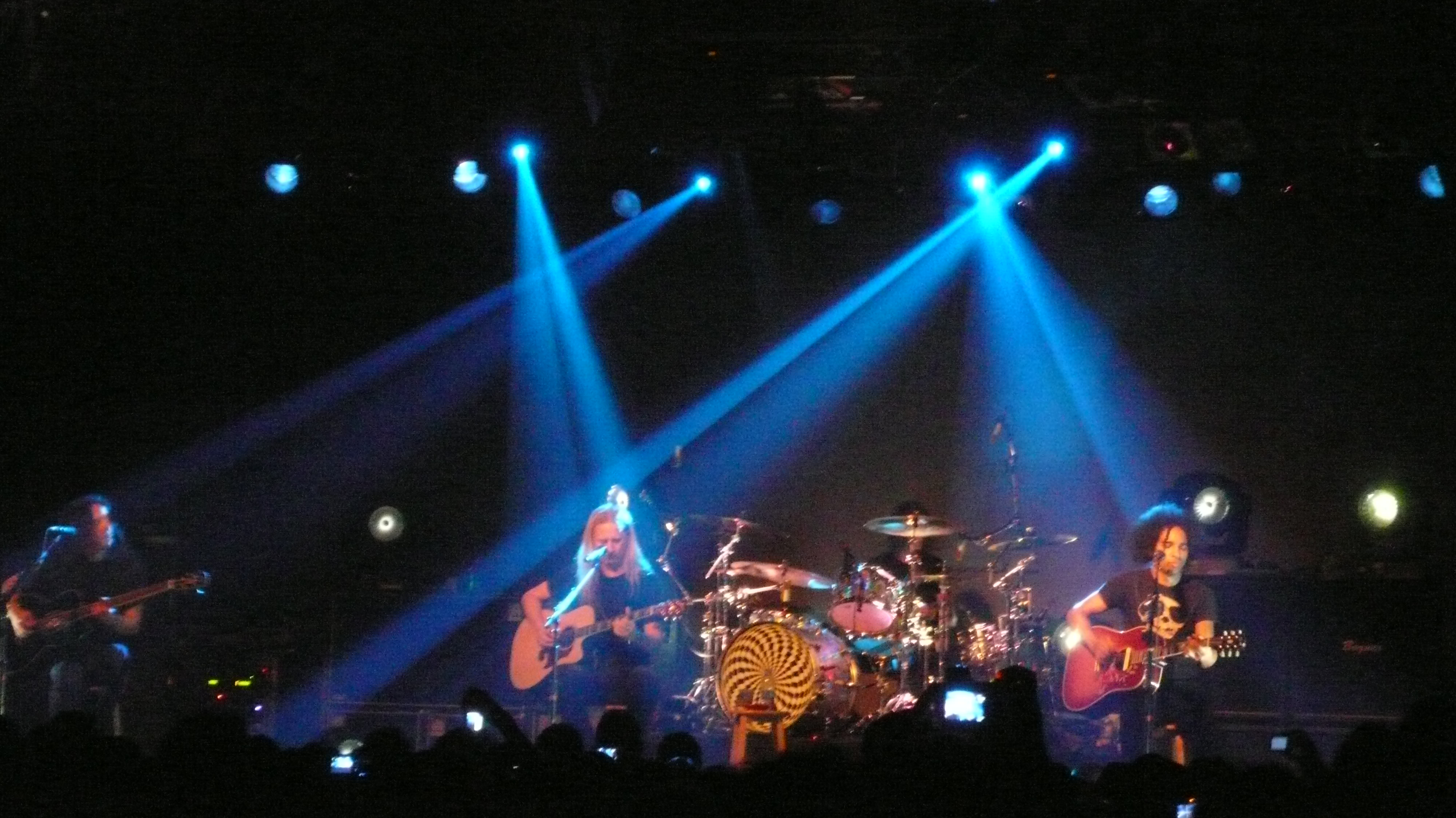
Inez performing with Alice in Chains in 2009

By January 1993, Inez had moved on to his next project. Alice in Chains bassist Mike Starr had left the group after the release of their album Dirt and Inez replaced him. Inez toured throughout 1993 with Alice in Chains on the strength of the Dirt album. The group also participated in the 1993 Lollapalooza Tour. Alice in Chains' Jar of Flies EP was released in 1994 with Inez on bass. Jar of Flies debuted at #1 on album sales charts, the first EP ever to do so.

Inez recorded with the band for their eponymous 1995 release Alice in Chains, which also debuted at #1. In 1996, Alice in Chains recorded their MTV Unplugged special, the first live performance the group had played together in three years. After their last live performance on July 3, 1996, Alice in Chains went on hiatus. Then in August 1998 Alice in Chains returned to the studio to release the songs "Get Born Again" and "Died". In 1999 the band went on hiatus once again, when rumors of vocalist Layne Staley's drug abuse arose. Alice in Chains officially disbanded on April 20, 2002, after the news of the death of Staley.

=== Slash's Snakepit (1995) ===
In 1995, Inez played with Slash on the Guns N' Roses guitarist's side group, Slash's Snakepit. The group recorded It's Five O'Clock Somewhere although Inez did not play any live shows during the corresponding tour. He also briefly rejoined Ozzy Osbourne's band on the Retirement Sucks tour after Geezer Butler resigned due to the pressures of touring.

=== Jerry Cantrell and Spys4Darwin (1998) ===
In 1997 Inez played with his Alice in Chains bandmate, Jerry Cantrell, on his debut solo album, Boggy Depot. In the following year, Inez played on the bonus track to Black Label Society's debut album Sonic Brew, a reworked heavy metal cover version of the Osbourne track "No More Tears". At around this time, Inez formed the band Spys4Darwin with Sean Kinney, Chris DeGarmo from Queensrÿche, and Vinnie Dombroski from Sponge. They released the microfish EP, and played radio festivals in the Northwest.

=== Black Label Society (2001–2004) ===
In mid-August 2001, Inez temporarily replaced Black Label Society bassist Steve Gibb, who was sent home in the middle of their Ozzfest tour. In 2003, Black Label Society's Robert Trujillo joined Metallica; Inez replaced him in Black Label Society, joining for a short two-week west coast tour of the United States and a short tour of Japan for their The Blessed Hellride album. A few songs from the Tokyo, Japan show of this tour appear in the bonus features section of their live DVD, Boozed, Broozed & Broken-Boned. In 2004, Inez recorded the track "Crazy or High" with Black Label Society for their studio album release Hangover Music Vol. VI.

=== Heart (2002–2006) ===
Following Layne Staley's death in April 2002, Inez joined Heart and toured with the band from 2002 through 2006. He appears on Heart's 2003 release, Alive in Seattle, a double CD live recording that documents a 2002 concert at Seattle's Paramount Theatre.

Inez also played bass and tambourine on Heart's 2004 album Jupiters Darling.

=== Alice in Chains reunion (2005–present) ===
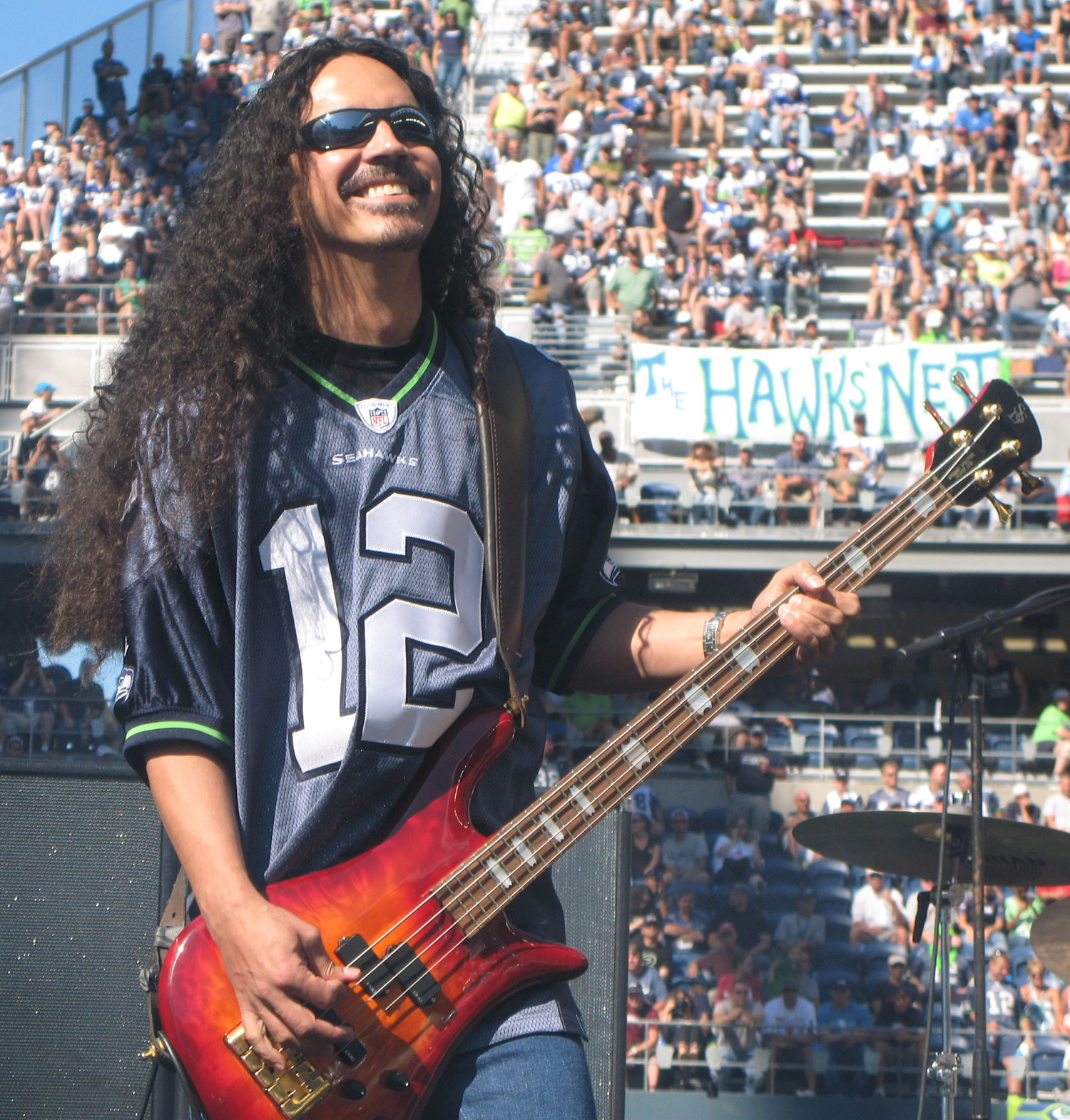
Inez performing at a Seattle Seahawks game

In 2005, Jerry Cantrell, Inez, and Sean Kinney reunited to perform a benefit concert in Seattle for victims of the tsunami disaster that struck South Asia in 2004. By 2006 Inez, along with the surviving members of Alice in Chains, Jerry Cantrell and Sean Kinney, set out for a world tour with various guest singers to fill in for the late Layne Staley. The main singer for the band's tour was William DuVall. The band was also featured on Decades of Rock: Heart and Friends where they performed "Would?" with Phil Anselmo and "Rooster" with William DuVall. DuVall would go on to be made the permanent singer of the group, which has since released three studio albums with Duvall and toured extensively since 2006.

== Guest appearances ==
In late 2002, Inez was considered to replace Jason Newsted in Metallica.

At the 2007 VH1 Rock Honors, Alice in Chains performed the tribute to Heart. Inez is the only musician who has been a member of both bands.

Inez was a guest player on "Under the Gun" from Motörhead's 2006 album Kiss of Death.

In early 2008, Inez recorded a "Behind the Player" instructional DVD with the help of John Tempesta. The DVD features lessons of some of Mike's favorite Alice in Chains songs, and a sit down in depth interview.

In 2019, Inez was a guest bass player on Mark Morton's debut solo album Anesthetic.

In July 5, 2025, Inez performed as bassist of Ozzy Osbourne's band on the "Back to the Beginning" show in Birmingham, which marked Osbourne's final stage appearance.

== Personal life ==
Inez is of Filipino descent. He married his fiancée Sydney Kelly on May 8, 2010, at the estate of Susan Silver, Alice in Chains' manager.

== Basses and amps ==
According to Bass Player Magazine, Inez uses the following basses:

- Warwick Streamer Stage I (x2)
- Warwick Alien acoustic bass
- Alvarez acoustic bass
- Gibson Les Paul bass
- Fender Telecaster bass
- Fender Precision bass
- Warwick Streamer 5-string
- Kubicki Factor bass
- Spector NS-2
- Gibson Thunderbird

Inez's basses are strung with medium-gauge Dean Markley Blue Steel strings.

Inez uses four Ampeg SVT-2PRO heads, two of them plugged into four 1x18" cabinets for the lows, and the other two plugged into two 8x10" cabinets. In addition, he sends his signal direct to the mixing board with a Tech 21 SansAmp Bass Driver DI.

== Discography ==
Year	Album details	Band	Notes
1993	Live & Loud: Released: June 28, 1993; Label: Epic Records	Ozzy Osbourne	
1994	Jar of Flies: Released: January 25, 1994; Label: Columbia Records	Alice in Chains	
1995	It's Five O'Clock Somewhere: Released: February 14, 1995; Label: Geffen Records	Slash's Snakepit	
1995	Alice in Chains: Released: November 7, 1995; Label: Columbia Records	Alice in Chains	
1996	Unplugged: Released: July 30, 1996; Label: Columbia Records	Alice in Chains	
1999	Nothing Safe: Best of the Box: Released: June 29, 1999; Label: Columbia Records	Alice in Chains	
1999	Music Bank: Released: October 26, 1999; Label: Columbia Records	Alice in Chains	
2000	Live: Released: December 5, 2000; Label: Columbia Records	Alice in Chains	
2001	Greatest Hits: Released: July 24, 2001; Label: Columbia Records	Alice in Chains	Bass on tracks 6–10.
2001	Microfish: Released: 2001; Label: Pied Viper Records	Spys4Darwin	
2003	Alive in Seattle: Released: June 10, 2003; Label: Capitol Records	Heart	
2004	Jupiters Darling: Released: June 22, 2004; Label: Sovereign	Heart	
2006	The Essential Alice in Chains: Released: September 5, 2006; Label: Columbia Records	Alice in Chains	Bass on Disc 2 except "Would?"
2009	Black Gives Way to Blue: Released: September 25, 2009; Label: Virgin Records EMI Records	Alice in Chains	
2013	The Devil Put Dinosaurs Here: Released: May 28, 2013; Label: Capitol Records Universal	Alice in Chains	
2018	Rainier Fog: Released: August 24, 2018; Label: BMG	Alice in Chains	
2019	Live in Atlantic City: Release date: January 25, 2019; Label: earMUSIC	Heart	

Other appearances

Year	Album details	Band	Notes
1998	Boggy Depot: Released: March 31, 1998 (Vinyl record) April 7, 1998 (CD); Label: Columbia Records	Jerry Cantrell	Bass on "Cut You In", "Jesus Hands" and "Devil by His Side"
1999	Sonic Brew: Released: October 28, 1998 (Japan) May 4, 1999 (USA); Label: Spitfire Records	Black Label Society	On track "No More Tears"
2003	Boozed, Broozed & Broken-Boned: Released: August 12, 2003; Label: Eagle Vision	Black Label Society	Live DVD. Mike appears on the Tokyo, Japan section
2004	Hangover Music Vol. VI: Released: April 20, 2004; Label: Spitfire Records	Black Label Society	On track "Crazy Or High"
2005	Kings of Damnation 98–04: Released: October 2005; Label: Spitfire Records	Black Label Society	On "Crazy Or High" and on "No More Tears" (from Bonus Disc)
2006	Kiss of Death: Released: August 29, 2006; Label: SPV/Steamhammer	Motörhead	Bass on "Under the Gun"
2019	Anesthetic: Released: March 1, 2019; Label: Spinefarm Records	Mark Morton	Tracks 3, 4, 5, 6, 7 and 9

== Filmography ==
Year	Title	Role	Notes
1995	The Nona Tapes	Himself	Short film
2013	AIC 23	Unta Gleeben Glabben Globben Globin	Short film
