= The Treehouse Tapes =

1988 demo album by Alice in Chains

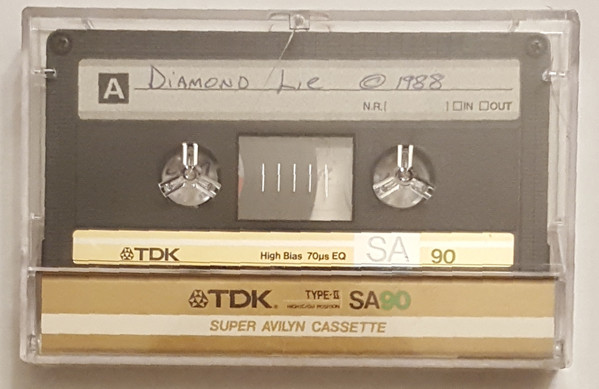

Demo album by Alice in Chains
- Released: 1988
- Recorded: 1988
- Studio: Treehouse Studio, Issaquah
- Genre: Glam metal
- Length: 27:02
- Producer: Alice in Chains

Alice in Chains chronology
| The Treehouse Tapes (1988) | Demo 2 (1988) |

The Treehouse Tapes is the debut demo album by the American rock band Alice in Chains, recorded in early 1988 under the name Diamond Lie. The recordings took place at Treehouse Studio in Issaquah, Washington. The band independently released the demo, handling both production and distribution. Several tracks from this demo were later included on their second demo from 1988 and subsequently featured in the retrospective compilation box set Music Bank (1999).

== Background ==
In the summer of 1987, guitarist Jerry Cantrell, previously a member of Diamond Lie and Gypsy Rose, was introduced to Layne Staley, the vocalist of Alice N' Chains, through Nick Pollock. Staley offered Cantrell a place to stay at the Music Bank, a 24-hour rehearsal space complex with 60 rooms located near the Ballard Bridge in Seattle, which played a significant role in fostering local musical talent. Staley, who lived at the Music Bank and served as its night manager, was involved with Alice N' Chains, which was beginning to disband.

During this period, Cantrell and drummer Sean Kinney began forming a new musical project, recruiting bassist Mike Starr, with whom Cantrell had briefly played in Gypsy Rose. Kinney and Starr had previously performed together in the band Cyprus. Staley occasionally jammed with Cantrell's new band but was hesitant to join full-time due to his involvement in Ron Holt's short-lived project, 40 Years of Hate, which recorded tracks at Music Bank and Holt's home in Edmonds, Washington. A mutual arrangement allowed Staley to sing with Cantrell's band while Cantrell played guitar for 40 Years of Hate.

A local promoter, impressed by a rehearsal at Music Bank, arranged for Cantrell's band to perform at Kane Hall at the University of Washington in Seattle on 15 January 1988. Following the dissolution of 40 Years of Hate, Staley joined Cantrell, Starr, and Kinney, adopting the name Diamond Lie, derived from Cantrell's former band with permission from his ex-bandmates. To persuade Staley, Cantrell, Starr, and Kinney deliberately auditioned poor vocalists, including a redheaded stripper, prompting Staley to join after growing frustrated with the candidates. The band officially became Alice in Chains in the summer of 1988. Their Kane Hall performance, reviewed by journalist Jenny Bendel in City Heat magazine, marked their first press mention.

== Recording ==
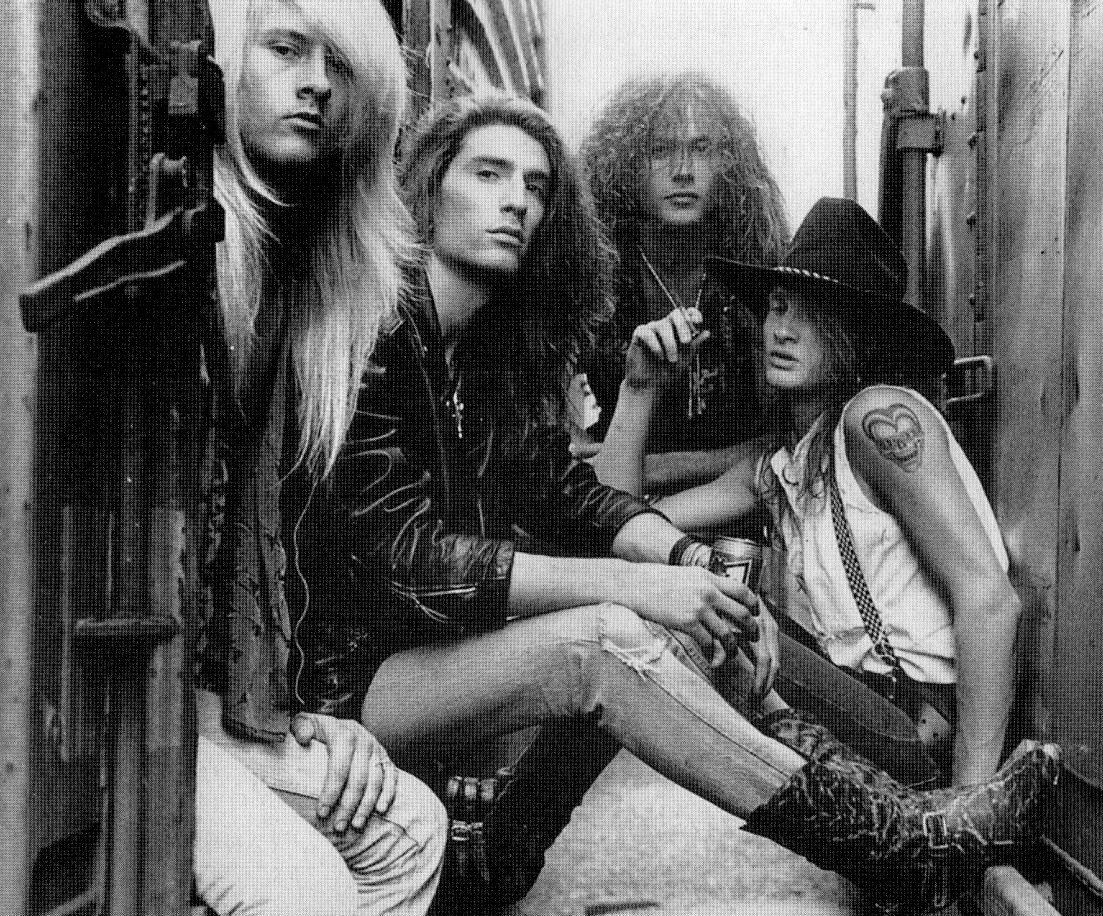
Alice in Chains in 1988

After finalizing their lineup, the band began recording their debut demo. Borrowing a van from the local band Coffin Break, they transported their instruments and equipment to Issaquah, Washington, where they recorded eight tracks at Treehouse Studio, a converted recording space owned by producer PC Ring. Cantrell recalled: "I paid for the demo we did in a treehouse on a mountainside – no joke. We borrowed a van from Coffin Break and recorded that damn demo at the top of that mountain in a treehouse in Issaquah. We lost all our gear on the way because the back door flew open. But we got it done". Notably, Coffin Break shared a rehearsal room with Alice in Chains at Music Bank for a year.

Drummer Sean Kinney, in an interview with Kerrang!, described the recording process:

Jerry Cantrell's mom had just passed away, leaving some money we decided to spend on a demo. We hadn't known each other long, and we just wanted a demo to get gigs at local clubs. We recorded those songs at Treehouse. During our early shows, Layne was so young he couldn't even enter the venue until we started playing. We weren't a serious band at first, but after that demo, we knew we wanted to make something of it.

According to David de Sola, author of Alice in Chains: The Untold Story (2015), The Treehouse Tapes played a "pivotal role in the band's early history". Alice in Chains' then-managers Kelly Curtis and Susan Silver passed on the demo to Columbia Records' A&R representative Nick Terzo, who set up an appointment with label president Don Ienner. Terzo signed Alice in Chains to Columbia Records in 1989 based on The Treehouse Tapes, and the band released their first studio album, Facelift, in 1990.

== Album description ==
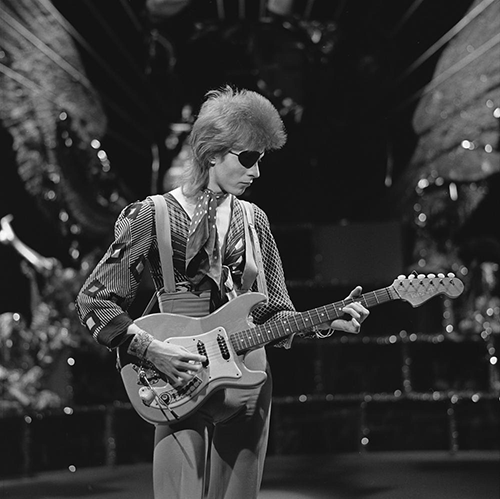
The band recorded a cover of David Bowie's Suffragette City (pictured in 1974)

The Treehouse Tapes comprises eight tracks, including a cover of David Bowie's Suffragette City from his 1972 album The Rise and Fall of Ziggy Stardust and the Spiders from Mars. The idea to cover Bowie's song originated from Cantrell's time in Diamond Lie, proposed by their former vocalist Scott Damon. Music journalist Jordan Babula, writing for Teraz Rock, described Alice in Chains' 1988 sound as a blend of Guns N' Roses and Mother Love Bone, characterizing parts of The Treehouse Tapes as heavy metal in the style of Guns N' Roses. The band sold copies of the demo at their concerts.

The tracks I Can't Have You Blues, Killing Yourself, and Whatcha Gonna Do were included on the band's second demo, recorded in the summer of 1988 with producer Rick Parashar at London Bridge Studio in Seattle. These tracks later appeared on subsequent Alice in Chains releases. Killing Yourself was re-recorded during sessions for the band's debut album Facelift (1990) but was excluded due to Staley's dissatisfaction with it. A faster version, lasting 2 minutes and 39 seconds, was included on the vinyl edition of the EP We Die Young, released in the summer of 1990 by Columbia Records. Written in late 1986, Queen of the Rodeo dates back to Staley's time with Alice N' Chains. A live version was included on Music Bank (1999) and the live compilation album Live (2000).

Kinney reflected on the demo's tracks: "They were a bit silly […] When we recorded them, those songs didn't seem that frivolous because that was the musical climate at the time. Even though some of the songs are pretty embarrassing, there are moments that are good. I think the chorus in Social Parasite was pretty cool". Notably, Social Parasite was not included on The Treehouse Tapes but appeared as a 1988 demo track on Music Bank (1999).

== Track list ==
Track list
| No. | Title | Writer(s) | Length |
|---|---|---|---|
| 1. | "Bite the Bullet" | Unknown | 2:00 |
| 2. | "Chemical Addiction" | Unknown | 4:52 |
| 3. | "I Can't Have You Blues" | Jerry Cantrell | 4:01 |
| 4. | "Killing Yourself" | Layne Staley, Jerry Cantrell | 3:03 |
| 5. | "Fairytale Love Story" | Unknown | 3:11 |
| 6. | "Suffragette City" | David Bowie | 3:07 |
| 7. | "Queen of the Rodeo" | Layne Staley, Jet Silver | 3:54 |
| 8. | "Whatcha Gonna Do" | Layne Staley, Jerry Cantrell | 2:54 |
| Total length: | | | 27:02 |

== Additional information ==
- A faster version of track 4 was included on the EP We Die Young (1990).
- Tracks 3, 4, and 8 were included on the band's second demo from 1988, with versions from that demo featured on the compilation box set Music Bank (1999).
- A live version of track 7 was included on Music Bank (1999) and the live compilation album Live (2000).

== Bibliography ==
- Jagielski, Piotr (2023). Grunge. Bękarty z Seattle [Grunge: Bastards from Seattle] (in Polish). Wydawnictwo Czarne. ISBN 9788381917971.
- Prato, Greg (2009). Grunge Is Dead: The Oral History of Seattle Rock Music. ECW Press. ISBN 978-1550228779.
- de Sola, David (2015). Alice in Chains: The Untold Story. Thomas Dunne Books. ISBN 978-1250048073.
- Yarm, Mark (2019). Wszyscy kochają nasze miasto. Historia grunge'u z pierwszej ręki [Everybody Loves Our Town: An Oral History of Grunge] (in Polish). Translated by Bogusławska, Joanna. Kagra. ISBN 978-83-63785-43-7.
