= The Crocodile =

Music venue in Seattle

Coordinates: 47°36′49″N 122°20′40″W

- The Croc
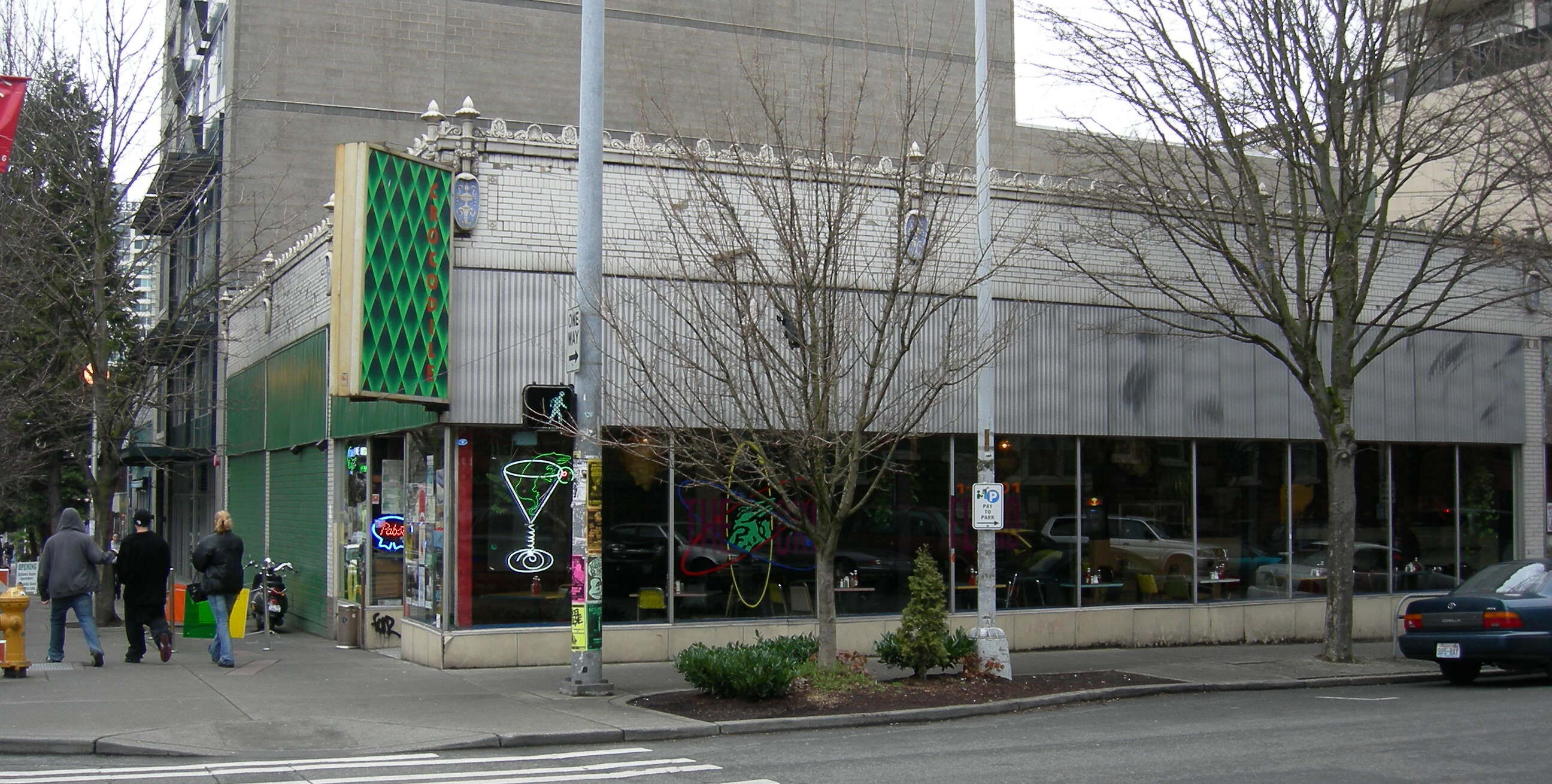
- Exterior of the club (c. 2007)
- Interactive map of The Crocodile
- Former names: Crocodile Cafe (1991–2007)
- Address: 2505 1st Ave, Seattle, Washington, U.S. (2021–present); 2200 2nd Ave, Seattle (1991–2020); Seattle
- Location: Belltown
- Owner: Marcus Charles; Susan Silver; Sean Kinney; Eric Howk; Peggy Curtis
- Capacity: 1150

Construction
- Opened: April 30, 1991
- Renovated: 2008–09
- Expanded: 2020–21

Website
- Venue Website

The Crocodile (formerly the Crocodile Cafe, and sometimes called The Croc) is a music club at 2505 1st Avenue at Wall Street in the Belltown neighborhood of Seattle, Washington, United States. Opened by Stephanie Dorgan as the "Crocodile Cafe" on April 30, 1991, it quickly became a fixture of the city's music scene. The Crocodile Cafe closed in December 2007, before being reopened as The Crocodile on March 21, 2009. Since then, the club has been owned by Alice in Chains' drummer Sean Kinney, manager Susan Silver, Portugal. The Man guitarist Eric Howk, Peggy Curtis, and Capitol Hill Block Party co-founder Marcus Charles. The Crocodile relocated to a bigger building at 2505 1st Avenue, four blocks away from its original location (2200 2nd Avenue).

In 2013, Rolling Stone ranked The Crocodile as the seventh best club in the U.S., and The Guardian included the club in its list of the top 10 live music venues in Seattle. Artists such as Nirvana, Pearl Jam, Alice in Chains, Soundgarden, Mad Season, R.E.M., Ann Wilson, Mudhoney, Cheap Trick, Yoko Ono, Sweet Water, Social Distortion, Green Day, The Strokes, Beastie Boys, Porcupine Tree, Alice Merton, Billie Eilish and Tom Morello have performed at the club.

== History ==
Originally a 550-capacity building named the Crocodile Cafe, it was located at the 2200 2nd Avenue on Blanchard Street in the Belltown neighborhood of Seattle. The venue's first show featured The Posies and Love Battery; the last, Robin Pecknold, J. Tillman, and David Bazan. During its initial 16-year run, the Croc hosted numerous well-known acts including Mudhoney, Tad, Nirvana, Palomar, Pearl Jam, Sunny Day Real Estate, Everclear, Mad Season, Green Day, The Strokes, Joanna Newsom, Cheap Trick, Indigo Girls, Robyn Hitchcock, Porcupine Tree, Glenn Tilbrook, Rhonda Vincent, Death Cab for Cutie, Yoko Ono, Ann Wilson, Sleater-Kinney, R.E.M., Soft Boys, Built to Spill, Neutral Milk Hotel, Dinosaur Jr., Beastie Boys, Corinne Bailey Rae, Rachael Yamagata, The Summer Obsession, Kevn Kinney of Drivin N Cryin, Ventures, Chris Knox, The Presidents of the United States of America, and Harvey Danger, who chose the Cafe for their final performance.

Mad Season played their first concert at the Crocodile Cafe on October 12, 1994, under the name The Gacy Bunch.

In February 1996, Seattle's Popllama Records released the compilation album Bite Back: Live at the Crocodile Cafe, which featured bands such as The Walkabouts, Girl Trouble, Flop, and Gas Huffer.

After opening the Crocodile Cafe, owner Stephanie Dorgan later married R.E.M. guitarist Peter Buck, who became a partner in the Crocodile. Buck often played there with his other band, The Minus 5. Dorgan and Buck divorced in 2006 and the Croc closed unexpectedly on December 15, 2007.

Re-opening

The closing of the Crocodile Cafe, a fixture of the local music scene, caused widespread speculation in regard to the future of the establishment. After months of speculation, a group of business people and musicians including Alice in Chains' drummer Sean Kinney, Alice in Chains manager Susan Silver, Peggy Curtis, Portugal. The Man guitarist Eric Howk, and Capitol Hill Block Party co-founder Marcus Charles purchased the establishment. The new owners renamed it "The Crocodile" and reopened it on March 21, 2009, after much-needed renovation. The official opening was preceded by two consecutive nights of free "preview shows", on March 19 and 20, featuring all local bands.

Soundgarden performed for the first time in over a decade at The Crocodile on March 24, 2009. Without singer Chris Cornell, the band featured original members Kim Thayil, Matt Cameron and Ben Shepherd and performed a 3-song set with Tad lead vocalist Tad Doyle on vocals as part of Tom Morello's Justice Tour.

In March 2013, Rolling Stone named The Crocodile as one of the best clubs in America, ranked at No. 7. The Guardian included the club in its list of the "Top 10 live music venues in Seattle".

On October 9, 2013, R&B singer JoJo performed "Smells Like Teen Spirit" during the final stop of her West Coast promotional tour. It was a little more than 21 years since Nirvana last performed at the club on October 4, 1992, billed as a "secret opening act" though they actually did not play "Teen Spirit" despite getting requests to do so, making this one of the few performances of the song at the Crocodile.

On August 22, 2018, Alice in Chains sent fans on a scavenger hunt to access a secret gig that the band would be performing in Seattle on August 24. Ten signed copies of their latest album Rainier Fog were hidden around the city as a ticket into the show, and the band asked the fans to keep an eye on their Instagram story for details on these 10 hidden locations. Once all 10 albums were found, the band revealed that the secret gig would be at The Crocodile with limited tickets available with the purchase of their new album at a pop-up event at the same venue the next day.

On August 23 and 24, 2018, The Crocodile hosted a pop-up shop and retrospective for Alice in Chains featuring rare photos, limited-edition merchandise, memorabilia and music gear that showcased the band's 30+ year career. The admission was free.

Re-location

The venue temporarily closed in March 2020 in compliance with Governor Jay Inslee's stay-at-home order, issued due to the COVID-19 pandemic. In November 2020, the owners announced that the venue would be moving from its original Belltown location a few blocks away to the former site of the Sailors' Union of the Pacific lodge at 1st Avenue and Wall Street. Adam Wakeling, a managing partner of The Crocodile, and his partners secured a 20-year lease on the 30,000 square-foot building.

On December 1, 2021, The Crocodile re-opened in its new location at 2505 1st Ave with a party for people in the music industry and press. The first shows in the new venue were performances from the comedy group Mega64 in the main 750-capacity showroom, and rapper MBNel in Madame Lou's, the 300-capacity venue downstairs. The Crocodile's new building also includes a café, 2 restaurant bars, 17 hotel rooms upstairs, as well as the "Here-After", a 100-seat theater/comedy club.

== In popular culture ==
The Crocodile Cafe appears on Cameron Crowe's 1992 film Singles.

Scenes from the 1995 film Georgia starring Jennifer Jason Leigh were shot at the venue.

== Gallery ==
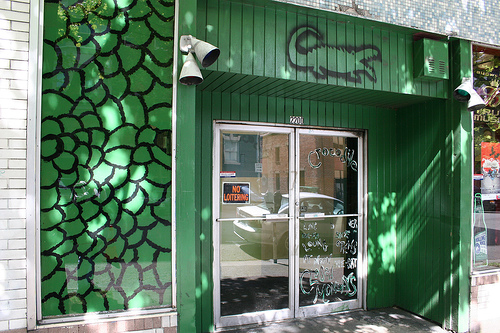
The cafe in May 2005

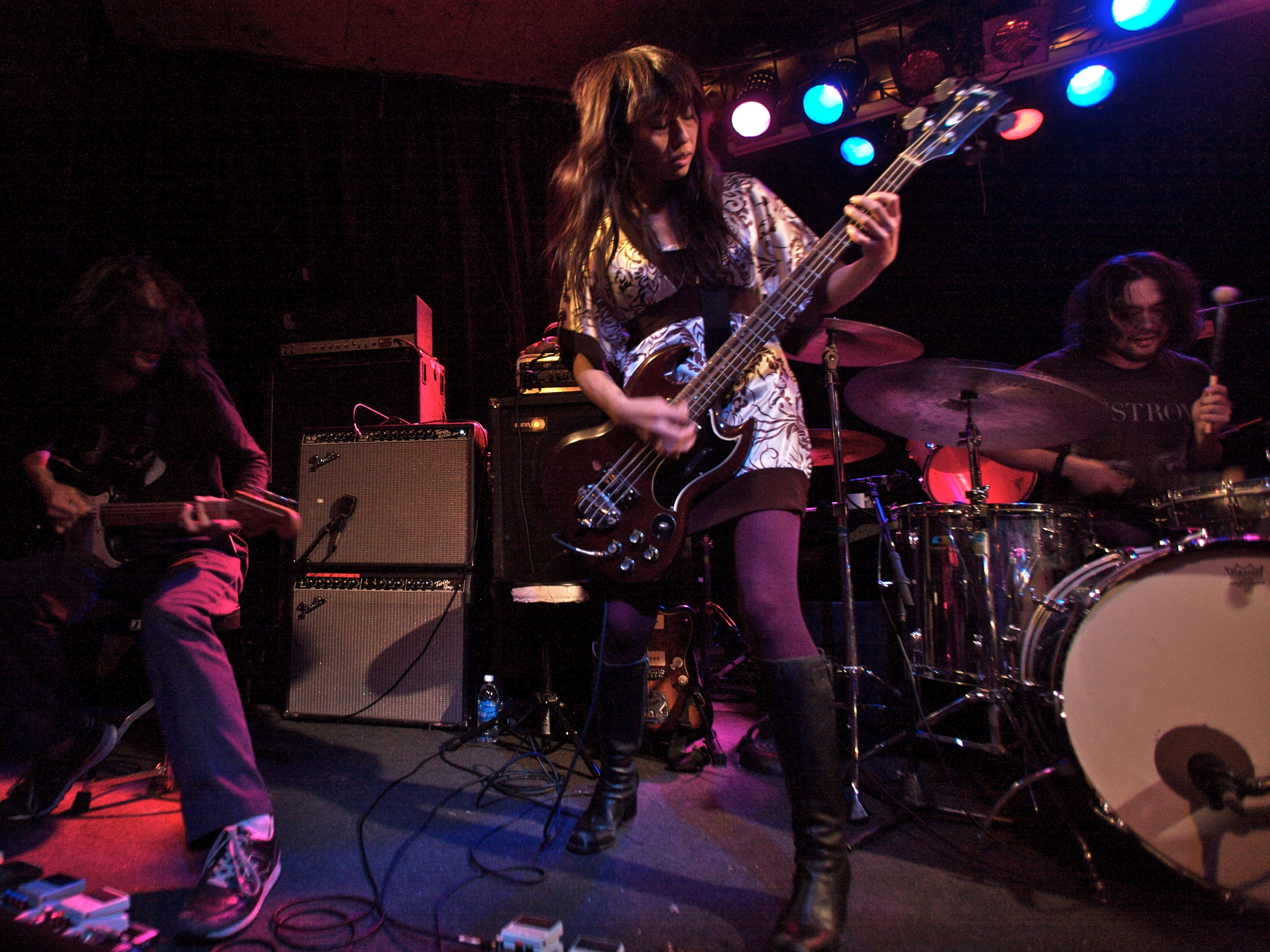
Mono performing in October 2007

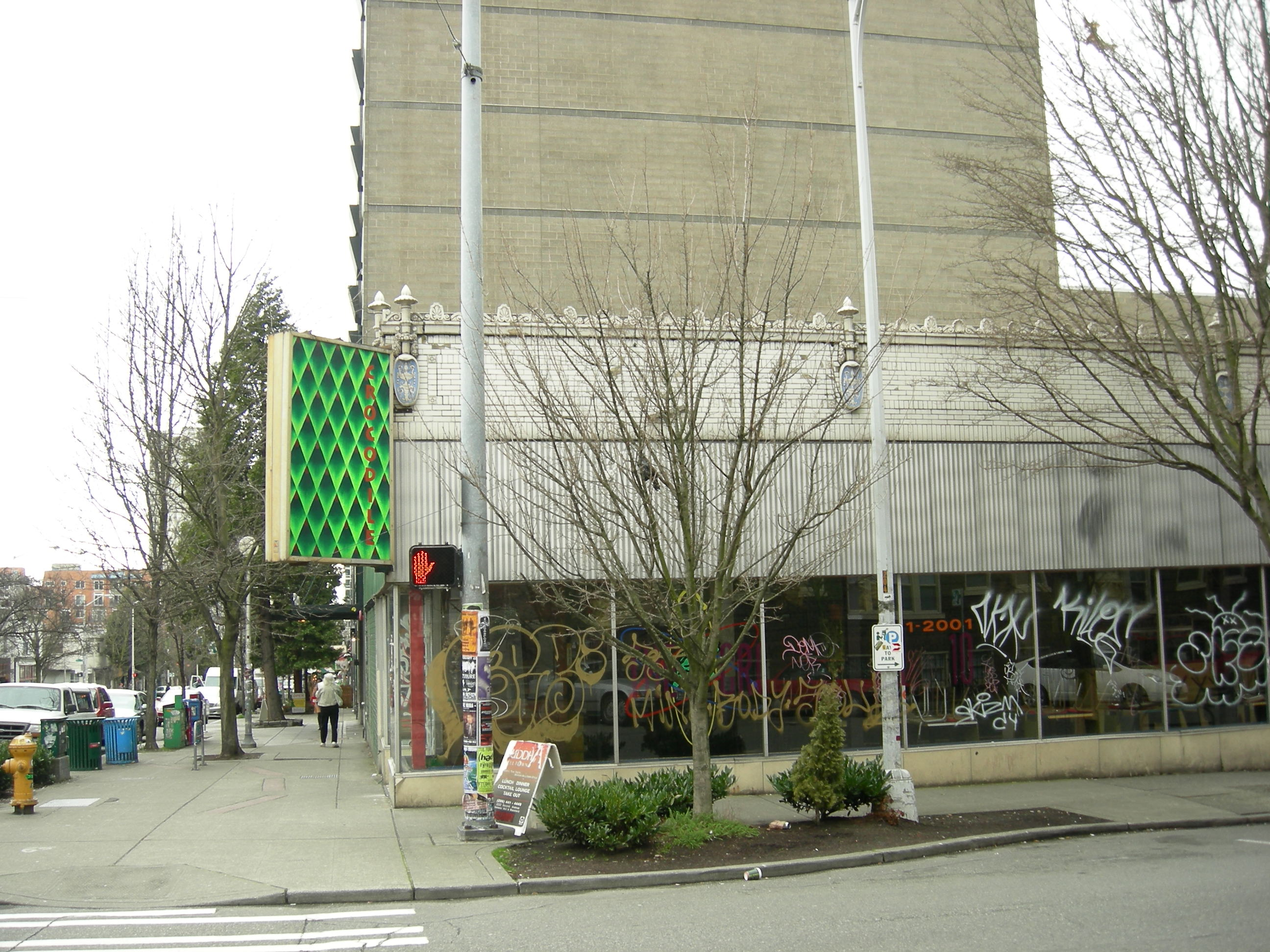
In February 2008 while closed (right side)

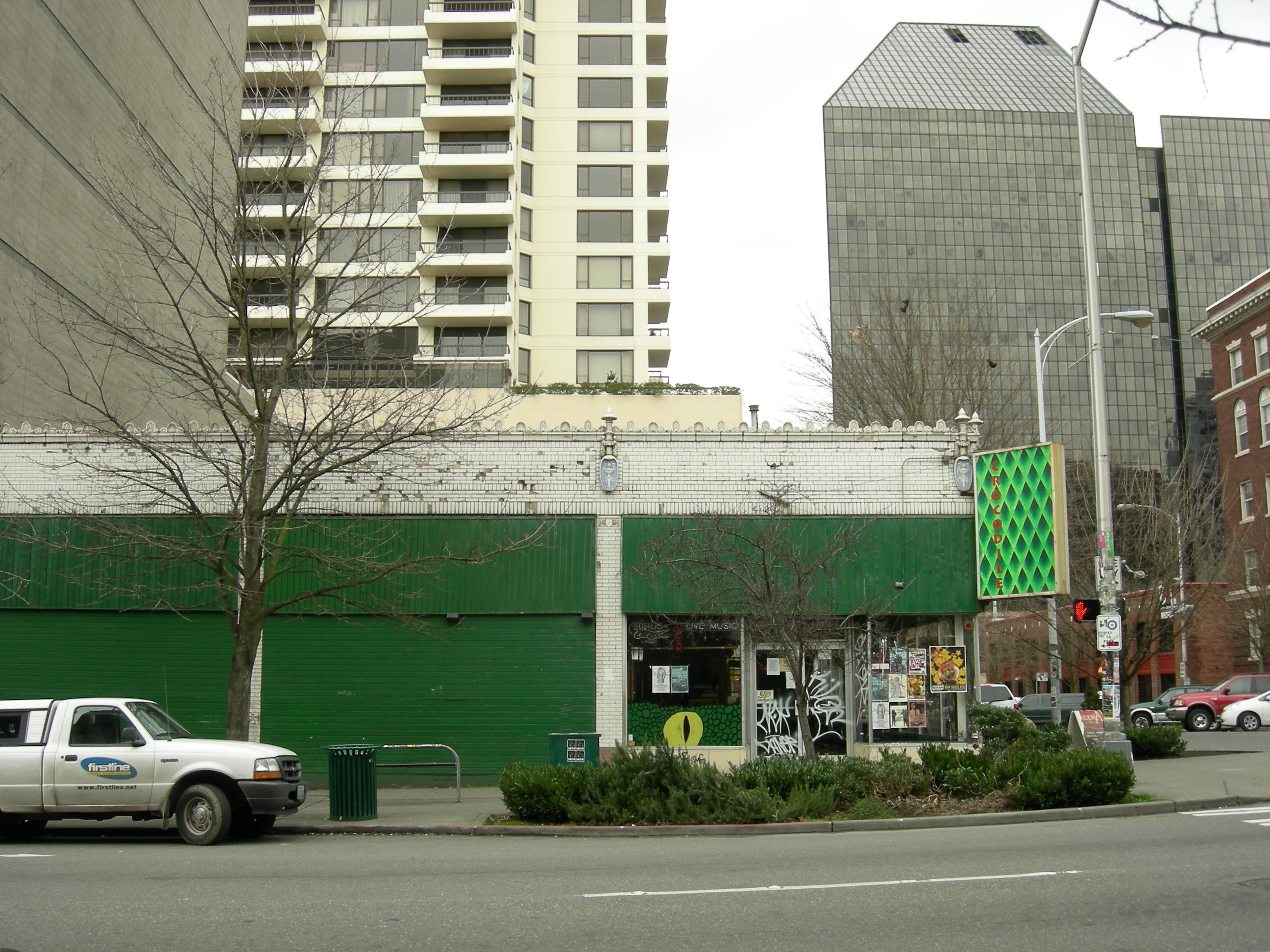
In February 2008 while closed (left side)

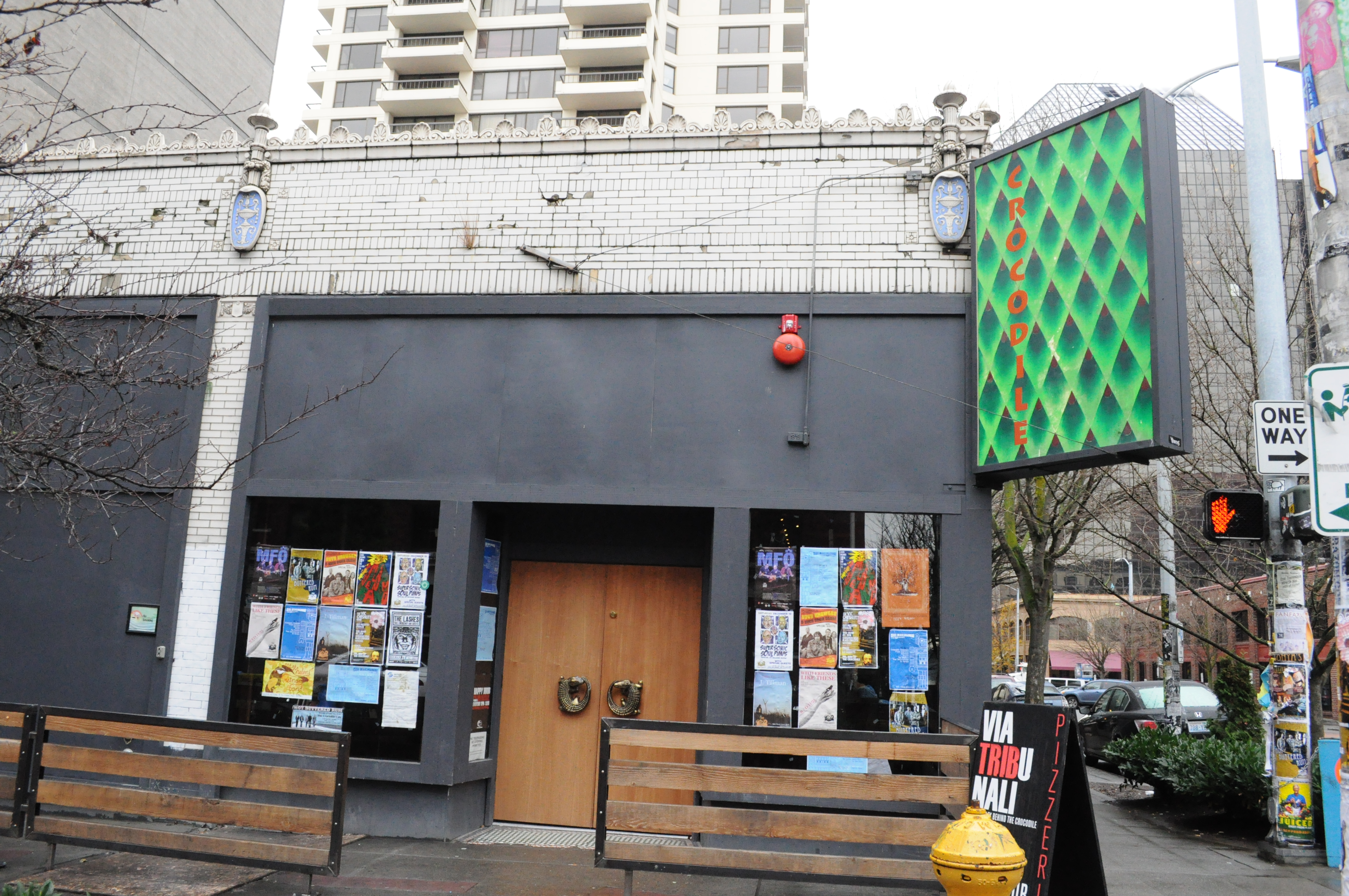
In November 2009, repainted black
