= Susan Silver =

American music manager (born 1958)

- Born: Susan Jean Silver; July 17, 1958 (age 68); Seattle, Washington, U.S.
- Education: University of Washington
- Occupations: Music manager; entrepreneur
- Years active: 1983–present
- Spouse: Chris Cornell (m. 1990; div. 2004)
- Children: 1

Susan Jean Silver (born July 17, 1958) is an American music manager and businesswoman, best known for managing Seattle rock bands such as Soundgarden, Alice in Chains and Screaming Trees. Silver also owns the company Susan Silver Management, and co-owns the club The Crocodile in Seattle. Silver was named "the most powerful figure in local rock management" by The Seattle Times in 1991. In 2025, Variety called Silver "one of the most important female managers in music history".

== Biography ==
=== Early life ===
Susan Jean Silver was born in Seattle, Washington, on July 17, 1958, to Emmogene Molly (Jean) Silver (née Higman) (1924–2017), who had Irish heritage, and Samuel Wilson Silver (1916–2015), who was born in North Dakota to Jewish parents from Belarus. She has two younger brothers, an older half-sister from her mother's first marriage, and an older half-brother from her father's first marriage. Her mother worked at Boeing in her early twenties during World War II as part of the war effort. Her father was the fourth pilot hired for Alaska Airlines and represented the company as one of many pilots that participated in Operation Magic Carpet in 1949–50, where he flew approximately 1,000 Yemenite Jews to Israel.

Silver played keyboards and clarinet during her youth. In college, Silver took choral classes and loved singing, but she said she realized she was bad at it and never considered being a musician as a career.

Silver majored in Chinese at the University of Washington.

=== Career ===
Silver had attended all the major concerts in Seattle since she was 15. She started by booking concerts for the club The Metropolis and Sub Pop co-founder Jonathan Poneman's club parties. After The Metropolis was closed, Silver was putting shows on wherever she could find a venue, without working in a particular club. Later on, she was doing production work on bigger shows, such as working on catering or in the production office for the biggest promoters in Seattle. Silver organized shows for bands that were underground at the time, such as Soul Asylum, Faith No More, Meat Puppets and Sonic Youth.

Silver started working as a music manager in 1983. Her first clients were the bands The U-Men and First Thought. In 1985, Silver met Soundgarden, whose lead vocalist was her then-boyfriend and future husband Chris Cornell, and in the following year she started managing the band. Back then, Silver was also managing Screaming Trees. Silver said she became a manager because she wanted to help musicians achieve their dreams.

At the same time that she was managing rock bands, Silver was also the manager of a John Fluevog shoe store in Seattle where several local musicians would hang out. The store would become famous years later for selling the Dr. Martens boots worn by several members of Grunge bands from Seattle, which along with flannel shirts and jeans became known as "Grunge fashion". One of Silver's employees at the store circa 1987 was Kevin Martin, lead vocalist of Candlebox, when he was still a teenager and before the band was formed.

In 1988, Silver met music manager Kelly Curtis. Curtis and his friend Ken Deans owned a company, and Deans was the manager of the band Alice in Chains. Deans gave Silver an Alice in Chains cassette tape and she liked it. Silver then went to an Alice in Chains concert and thought they were fun and very energetic. When Curtis became interested in working with the band Mother Love Bone, Deans decided that he did not want to work with Alice in Chains anymore, so he offered the managing job to Silver and Curtis, who started co-managing the band. Curtis and Silver passed on the Alice in Chains demo tape The Treehouse Tapes to Columbia Records' A&R representative Nick Terzo, who set up an appointment with label president Don Ienner. Based on that demo, Terzo signed Alice in Chains to Columbia in 1989, and the band released their first studio album, Facelift, in 1990, which became the first album from the grunge movement to be certified gold by the Recording Industry Association of America (RIAA). Some time later, Curtis started managing the band Pearl Jam, and Silver became the sole manager of Alice in Chains. Alice in Chains' guitarist/vocalist Jerry Cantrell was living at Silver and Cornell's house at the start of 1991 when he wrote the band's hit song "Rooster". In the early 1990s, Alice in Chains' lead vocalist Layne Staley enrolled in several rehab programs, but he failed to stay clean for long. During the band's tour in support of their 1992 album Dirt, Silver hired bodyguards to keep Staley away from people who might try to pass him drugs, but he ended up relapsing on alcohol and drugs during the tour. Alice in Chains stopped touring in 1996 and Staley became a recluse.

Silver had other jobs until her work as a music manager became her full-time paying job in 1991. She also founded the company Susan Silver Management.

In May 1990, Seattle-based record label Sub Pop sent Nirvana a new proposed contract, but vocalist Kurt Cobain was reluctant to sign it, complaining about the label's lack of promotion for their debut album, Bleach. Cobain and bassist Krist Novoselic consulted Silver for advice because she had helped Soundgarden sign with A&M Records, and she looked at the contract and told them they needed a lawyer. Cobain and Novoselic asked Silver to be their manager, but she declined the offer because she was busy with Soundgarden, Alice in Chains, Screaming Trees and other bands, but she promised to help them. A few weeks later they met Silver in Los Angeles and she introduced them to agent Don Muller and music business attorney Alan Mintz, who specialized in finding deals for new bands. Mintz started sending out Nirvana's demo tape to major labels looking for deals. MCA Records expressed interest, but the band ended up choosing DGC (part of Geffen Records) following advice from Sonic Youth, and the label released their hit album Nevermind in 1991. When Nirvana was inducted into the Rock and Roll Hall of Fame in 2014, Novoselic thanked Silver during his speech for introducing them to the music industry properly. "There aren't many things I regret about my life, but of course not managing Nirvana was a mistake", Silver said in 2022.

Shortly before Cobain's death, Silver received an emergency call from his wife Courtney Love asking for help because she feared that Cobain would kill himself. Silver told Love that first she needed to make sure that she and her daughter were safe, then she helped Love and Nirvana's manager get in contact with Lou Cox, a New York doctor who had helped Alice in Chains and Aerosmith through their recovery, but they ended up choosing a different interventionist and the intenvention they staged for Cobain (that Silver was not a part of) did not go well and he ended up killing himself in April 1994. Following Cobain's death, Silver organized a private funeral service in a church and a simultaneous public candlelight vigil for him at Seattle Center.

In 1996, Silver was featured on Doug Pray's documentary Hype!, talking about the Seattle music scene. Pray said about Silver in a 1997 interview with the Chicago Sun-Times: "In a world where the music industry is a really crazy place, Susan is an island of sanity."

Among Silver's clients in the 1990s were the bands Hater, Inflatable Soule, Crackerbox, Sweet Water, Sponge, singer Kristen Barry, and producer Terry Date.

In 1998, Silver retired from the music business to concentrate on her family. In 2005, Silver and Deborah Semer formed a new company in Seattle, Atmosphere Artist Management. Their first client was the music and dance group Children of the Revolution.

Alice in Chains was inactive from 1996 until 2005. After lead vocalist Layne Staley died of a drug overdose in 2002, the band only performed in public again in February 2005 for a benefit concert with guest vocalists in Seattle. After that experience, the band called Silver and said they wanted to tour as Alice in Chains again. The band released their first album with new vocalist William DuVall in September 2009, Black Gives Way to Blue. The album debuted at No. 5 on the Billboard 200 chart, and was certified gold by the RIAA in 2010 for shipments in excess of 500,000 copies in the United States.

Since 2009, Silver co-manages Alice in Chains along with David Benveniste and his company Velvet Hammer Management.

Silver managed Soundgarden until 2010.

== Other ventures ==
In 1995, Silver supported Krist Novoselic's political-action committee, Joint Artists and Music Promotions (JAMPAC), to defend the rights of artists and their fans.

Since 2009, Silver co-owns the club The Crocodile in Seattle along with Alice in Chains' drummer Sean Kinney, Capitol Hill Block Party co-founder Marcus Charles, Peggy Curtis, and Portugal. The Man guitarist Eric Howk. In 2013, Rolling Stone named The Crocodile as one of the best clubs in America, ranked at No. 7. The Guardian included the club in its list of the "Top 10 live music venues in Seattle".

Silver collaborates on the Musicians' Mental Health & Wellness Fund through SMASH Seattle.

On November 21, 2019, Silver interviewed writer and political activist Gloria Steinem at the Paramount Theater in Seattle when Steinem was promoting her book, The Truth Will Set You Free, But First It Will Piss You Off!.

Silver is a volunteer at the music and film youth camp Prodigy Camp. One of the original Campers who later came back as a mentor for young people is singer Chappell Roan.

== Legacy ==
In 1991, Silver was named "the most powerful figure in local rock management" by The Seattle Times.

In 2019, Pearl Jam's guitarist Stone Gossard said that Silver is "our compatriot in music and art and community from the very beginning, whose vision and perseverance helped create the music scene in Seattle that went on to change the world."

In 2022, Silver was honored with the Washington Music Icon Award by Music Aid Northwest.

In 2025, Vice magazine wrote that Silver was "crucial in Seattle in the '80s and '90s", and that without Silver, "there may have never been a grunge scene." The same year, Variety called Silver "not only one of the most important music managers of that [grunge] era, but also one of the most important female managers in music history", adding that Silver "showed a poise, professionalism and politeness that was rare, to say the least, for that brawny and undomesticated sector of the indie-rock scene."

Michele Anthony, the Executive Vice President of Universal Music Group and former Soundgarden attorney said about Silver; "Meeting Susan and the band as a very young lawyer and having the honor of representing them changed my life forever. Susan was and still is the den mother of what was one of the most flourishing and important music communities of our generation. She embraced me into that pioneering community of musicians, just as it was on the verge of changing music and culture forever. Soundgarden, with Susan as their manager, helped define that change. That was also the beginning of our lifetime friendship."

== Personal life ==
In 1985, Silver started dating Chris Cornell, the lead vocalist of Soundgarden, a band that Silver started managing a year later, and kept managing until 2010, and they got married in 1990. Cornell said about falling in love with Silver in an interview with Rolling Stone in October 1999: "the first time I was in love to the degree that I realized this person has suddenly become so important to me that I can't imagine life without her." Cornell wrote the song "Moonchild" from his 1999 debut solo album Euphoria Morning for Silver. Cornell also tattooed Silver's birth date in Chinese on his right shoulder. The couple's only child, a daughter named Lillian Jean, was born in June 2000. Cornell and Silver divorced in 2004.

Silver practices Transcendental Meditation. Silver explained: "Movement and dance... for the last 25 years, helps me physically feel better but lifts me emotionally in a profound way. I got lucky enough to get introduced to TM (Transcendental Meditation) when I was in high school so that was really important... Therapy has been really valuable for me and getting out in nature... those are the pillars for me. Having a spiritual practice… really important for me. It has been for decades and decades."

Silver is friends with Pearl Jam vocalist Eddie Vedder and supported him after the 1996 Rolling Stone hit piece.

Alice in Chains' vocalist and guitarist Jerry Cantrell named Silver as one of his heroes during a press conference in 2002. Cantrell also thanked Silver for being one of the people who helped him get into rehab during his speech at the MusiCares MAP Fund Benefit on May 31, 2012, where he was awarded the Stevie Ray Vaughan Award and referred to Silver as "my sister".

Silver is a fan of Édith Piaf, Eartha Kitt, Jeff Buckley, Tuatara, and also enjoys listening to Spanish guitarists and gospel singers.

Silver prefers to avoid the limelight and rarely gives interviews.

== Filmography ==
Year	Title	Role	Notes	Ref.
1996	Hype!	Herself	Documentary	
2001	VH1 News Special: Grunge	Herself	TV documentary	
2011	Pearl Jam Twenty	Herself	Documentary	
2012	Metal Evolution	Herself	TV Series documentary, episode: "Grunge"	
2017	Hype! 20 Years After	Herself	Documentary	
2021	Loudwire: 30 Years of Grunge	Herself	Web Miniseries documentary; episode: "Who Invented Grunge?"	
2025	It's Never Over, Jeff Buckley	Herself	Documentary	
