= Don't Follow =

Song by Alice in Chains

from the EP Jar of Flies
- Released: January 25, 1994
- Recorded: September 1993
- Studio: London Bridge (Seattle)
- Genre: Folk rock
- Length: 4:22
- Label: Columbia
- Songwriter: Jerry Cantrell
- Producers: Alice in Chains; Toby Wright

Alice in Chains singles chronology
"I Stay Away" (1994)	"Don't Follow" (1994)	"Got Me Wrong" (1994)

"Don't Follow" is a song by American rock band Alice in Chains from the band's 1994 EP Jar of Flies. The song was written by guitarist and vocalist Jerry Cantrell, who sings lead vocals in the first part of the song, followed by Layne Staley in the second part. The song spent seven weeks on Billboard's Mainstream Rock Tracks chart and peaked at No. 25.

== Composition ==
The song is very melancholic and soft; this is largely due to the lack of electrically amplified instruments—replaced by the gentle wail of a harmonica, and especially the lack of a rhythm section during the first half of the song. Lead guitarist/vocalist Jerry Cantrell sings during most of the song except the bridge, which vocalist Layne Staley sings. Bassist Mike Inez, musician Randy Biro and Jerry Cantrell's guitar tech Darrell Peters sang backing vocals for the second part of the song. Producer Toby Wright said of "Don't Follow":

"It was Jerry's concept of having him start out the song, Layne come in, and then we finish up [with a] two-sides-to-the-story type of thing, which I thought was a brilliant concept".

Diana Darzin detailed "Don't Follow" to be a folk rock effort, while Katherine Turman of Los Angeles Times proclaimed the song a "poignant ballad". Entertainment Weekly described the track as a "countryish campfire song".

== Release and reception ==
"Don't Follow" received airplay in October 1994, and peaked at number 25 on the Billboard Mainstream Rock Tracks chart in the week of December 3, 1994.

Ned Raggett of AllMusic called the song "one of the best" by Alice in Chains, referred to Cantrell's vocals on the song as "some of his best work ever," and said that the song "finds the band at its most calm, reflective, and gently warming."

== Live performances ==
"Don't Follow" was never performed live with Alice in Chains' original lead vocalist, Layne Staley. The first time the band performed the song was at their concert at the Marquee Theatre in Tempe, Arizona on September 25, 2006, with new vocalist William DuVall sharing vocals with Jerry Cantrell. The song was often performed during the band's reunion concerts between 2006 and 2007.

Jerry Cantrell performed the song during his solo concert at the Pico Union Project in Los Angeles on December 7, 2019.

== Use in other media ==
"Don't Follow" is the intro music for Lily Cornell Silver's IGTV interview series focused on mental health, Mind Wide Open, released on July 20, 2020 in honor of her late father Chris Cornell's 56th birthday. Silver explained why she chose the song:

I was having some people make intro music for me, and none of it was sounding quite right. And my mom [Alice in Chains manager Susan Silver] was like, “Let's think. What about an Alice song?” Hold up, Jar of Flies' “Don't Follow” was the first song I clicked on. And I was like, “Oh, that sounds so rad.” And then, Layne [Staley] obviously had his own struggles with mental health and addiction. And I've learned a ton from those guys. So it just had a lot of meaning to me in that way, in terms of what I've learned from them about strength, fortitude, stamina, and overcoming grief and loss.

== Personnel ==
Alice in Chains

- Jerry Cantrell – lead vocals, guitars
- Layne Staley – backing vocals, co-lead vocals
- Mike Inez – bass, backing vocals
- Sean Kinney – drums, percussion

Additional musicians

- David Atkinson – harmonica
- Randy Biro – backing vocals
- Darrell Peters – backing vocals

== Charts ==
Chart (1994)	Peak position
US Mainstream Rock (Billboard)	25
