= I Stay Away =

1994 single by Alice in Chains

- Promotional CD single

Promotional single by Alice in Chains

from the EP Jar of Flies
- Released: May 3, 1994
- Recorded: September 7–14, 1993
- Studio: London Bridge (Seattle)
- Genre: Grunge; alternative rock; acoustic rock
- Length: 4:14
- Label: Columbia
- Composers: Mike Inez; Jerry Cantrell
- Lyricist: Layne Staley
- Producers: Alice in Chains; Toby Wright

Alice in Chains singles chronology
"No Excuses" (1994)	"I Stay Away" (1994)	"Don't Follow" (1994)

Alternative cover
- UK Promo CD art

Music video
- "I Stay Away" on YouTube

"I Stay Away" is a song by the American rock band Alice in Chains from their third studio EP, Jar of Flies (1994). Columbia Records serviced the song to US radio on May 3, 1994. This song marked the first time the band wrote with bassist Mike Inez. The single reached No. 10 on Billboard's Mainstream Rock Tracks, and stayed in the chart for 26 weeks. "I Stay Away" was nominated for the Grammy Award for Best Hard Rock Performance in 1995. The song was included on the compilation albums Nothing Safe: Best of the Box (1999), Music Bank (1999), Greatest Hits (2001), and The Essential Alice in Chains (2006).

== Origin and recording ==
In the liner notes of 1999's Music Bank box set collection, guitarist Jerry Cantrell said of the song:

That was the first time we'd written with Mike Inez, which makes this another special song. The whole Jar of Flies EP proved to both us and the fans what a talented and valid part of the band Mike was. He plays the nastiest, darkest shit but he's got the sweetest heart in the world.

== Composition ==
The track is notably softer than Alice in Chains's previous recordings on both Facelift and Dirt; however, despite the bright opening guitar riff and verse, the song's pre-chorus suddenly detours into dark and sludgy electric guitars and a haunting vocal harmony. The chorus then reintroduces the upbeat acoustic guitar accompanied by violins. An electric guitar solo plays during the bridge.

== Release and reception ==
Columbia Records serviced "I Stay Away" to US radio on May 3, 1994. It debuted at No. 39 on the Billboard Mainstream Rock Tracks chart on the week of May 14, 1994, and peaked at No. 10 in the week of July 2, 1994. The song was nominated for the Grammy Award for Best Hard Rock Performance in 1995.

Ned Raggett of AllMusic said, "The seeming schizophrenia between massive rock crunch and gentle acoustic numbers was actually one of Alice in Chains' strongest traits, and on the brilliant "I Stay Away" the two impulses fused to create what on balance was the band's most uplifting song, sonically if not always lyrically."

"I Stay Away" was featured on Guitar World and Guitar Player's "Top 30 12-string guitar songs of all time" list in 2016 at No. 26.

== Music video ==
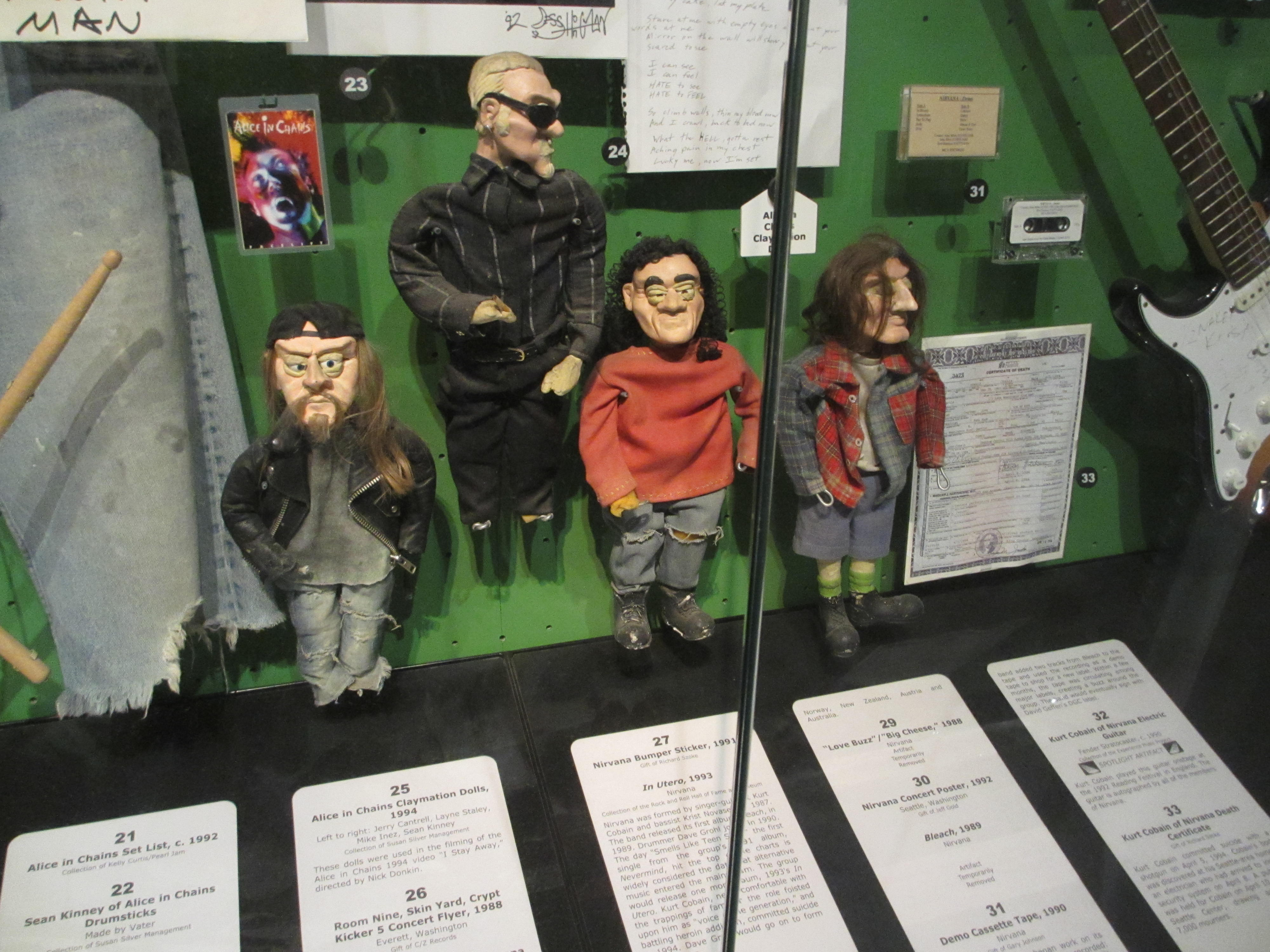
Alice in Chains' claymation dolls on display at the Rock and Roll Hall of Fame museum.

The music video for "I Stay Away" was released in May 1994 and was directed by Nick Donkin, also known for his animated short film The Junky's Christmas. The video was created entirely using stop-motion animation, and includes the band members in puppet form. The band travels to a circus aboard a bus, along with a sinister looking boy holding a jar full of flies. At the circus, the boy releases the flies that cause chaos to the animals and performers: an angry lion mauls its tamer, a daredevil loses control of his motorcycle during a stunt and crashes, two elephants panic, a trio of clowns crash their car and get in a fight, and a blindfolded knife thrower inadvertently kills his female assistant. Eventually, the circus burns down with the workers looking on in horror. Once the flies return to their jar, we see the boy petting them as a reward for a job well done. The video is available on the home video release Music Bank: The Videos.

The puppets used in the video are on display at the Rock and Roll Hall of Fame museum in Cleveland, Ohio.

== Live performances ==
Despite being one of the band's highest charting singles, "I Stay Away" was never played live with original vocalist and lyricist Layne Staley, and it has only been performed twice since the band's reunion.

On November 2, 2007, Alice In Chains performed the song live for the first time with new vocalist William DuVall and The NorthWest Symphony Orchestra at the Benaroya Hall in Seattle, as part of a benefit concert for the Seattle Children's Hospital.

== In popular culture ==
"I Stay Away" was featured in "Walking Erect" (1994), episode 10, season 3 of Beavis and Butt-Head.

== Track listing ==
All tracks are written by Layne Staley, Jerry Cantrell and Mike Inez, except where noted.

No.	Title	Length
1.	"I Stay Away"	4:13

UK release
No.	Title	Writer(s)	Length
1.	"I Stay Away"		4:13
2.	"Don't Follow"	Cantrell	4:21

== Personnel ==
Alice in Chains

- Layne Staley – lead vocals
- Jerry Cantrell – guitars, vocals
- Mike Inez – bass
- Sean Kinney – drums, percussion

Additional musicians

- April Acevez – viola
- Rebecca Clemons-Smith – violin
- Matthew Weiss – violin
- Justine – violoncello

== Charts ==
Chart (1994)	Peak position
US Mainstream Rock Airplay (Billboard)	10

== Certifications ==
Region	Certification	Certified units/sales
United States (RIAA)	Gold	500,000^{‡}
^{‡} Sales+streaming figures based on certification alone.

== Release history ==
Release dates and formats for "I Stay Away"
Region	Date	Format(s)	Label(s)	Ref.
United States	May 3, 1994	Radio	Columbia	
