= We Die Young =

EP by Alice in Chains
- Released: June 1990
- Studios: London Bridge (Seattle); Capitol (Hollywood)
- Genres: Heavy metal; grunge; alternative rock
- Length: 10:08
- Label: Columbia
- Producer: Dave Jerden

Alice in Chains chronology
Publisher Demos (1989)	We Die Young (1990)	Facelift (1990)

Alice in Chains singles chronology
"We Die Young" (1990)	"Man in the Box" (1991)

We Die Young is a song and single EP by American rock band Alice in Chains, engineered and co-produced by Dave Jerden. Released in June 1990, it is the band's first studio EP. It was released in the US on cassette, but also on vinyl as a promotional single only and has thus become a sought-after collector's item amongst Alice in Chains fans.

== Background ==
Bill Adams of Ground Control Magazine, reviewing Alice in Chains's discography, wrote:

For anyone who was already paying attention to Alice in Chains by 1990, that the band was signed to a major label (they were the second (after Soundgarden) of the more mainstream "grunge" bands to get signed, actually) likely didn't come as much of a surprise. The band had the chops and a sound that could pass as similar to the metal of the day (well, at least some of the time), and they were at least as good as Skid Row, Warrant, Living Colour and Winger – who were all getting a lot of attention at the time – so that Alice in Chains would even get a cursory glance from the majors seemed inevitable. Upon signing with Columbia, Alice in Chains made it clear that they were willing to play ball on major label, mainstream terms too; for the We Die Young EP, the band selected three songs from their book which most closely resembled the swaggering, crotch-grabbing norm, and played them to the hilt.

In the liner notes of 1999's Music Bank box set collection, guitarist Jerry Cantrell said of the title track: "I'd just temporarily moved in with Susan Silver because Sean [Kinney] and I had just had a fight. So I was riding the bus to rehearsal and I saw all these 9, 10, 11 year old kids with beepers dealing drugs. The sight of a 10 year old kid with a beeper and a cell phone dealing drugs equaled "We Die Young" to me."

== Release ==
A CD version of the EP exists as a single, however this only includes the title track and features artwork different from the vinyl/cassette version. The EP was a promotional only release issued before the band's first full-length album Facelift and has since gone out of print, with copies of the EP now fetching up to $100 dollars on trading sites such as eBay. The EP was re-released for Record Store Day 2022.

"We Die Young" and "It Ain't Like That" were released on the band's debut studio album, Facelift, later that year (1990). A demo version of "We Die Young" was released on Nothing Safe: Best of the Box (1999), the only song released on the compilation which was not available on Music Bank. The studio version was included on the band's 1999 box set, Music Bank, as well as on their 2006's compilation album, The Essential Alice in Chains. The version of the song "Killing Yourself" is exclusive to this EP; a faster-tempo demo version was later released on Music Bank.

"We Die Young" became a top five metal track at the time of its release. The music video was released in 1990 and was directed by Rocky Schenck, who would later direct the music videos for "Them Bones", "What the Hell Have I", and "Grind". The video features the band performing while various people drown in pools of blood. It was filmed in Glendale, California on the site of a house that was destroyed by the 1990 Glendale wildfires. The video is available on the home video releases Live Facelift and Music Bank: The Videos. An early music video for the song directed by The Art Institute of Seattle is also available on Music Bank: The Videos.

== Reception ==
Ned Raggett of AllMusic called the song "two and a half minutes of pure heavy metal rampage" and "a masterpiece of arrangement and production."

Bill Adams of Ground Control Magazine panned the title track in his review of the EP, writing, "the EP's title track opens the proceedings with a great big thud" and that "'Killing Yourself' opens with Staley howling like an ape before Cantrell does his best impression of Gilby Clarke for every note he plays during the song." Giving the EP an overall mixed review, he wrote, "Without overstating the point, it goes without saying that the We Die Young EP wasn't the single greatest start for Alice in Chains. Simply said, it sounded like everything else on the radio playlists of the day".

== Track listing ==
No.	Title	Writer(s)	Length
1.	"We Die Young"	Jerry Cantrell	2:31
2.	"It Ain't Like That"	Cantrell; Mike Starr; Sean Kinney	4:38
3.	"Killing Yourself"	Cantrell; Layne Staley	2:59
Total length:			10:08

== Personnel ==
- Layne Staley – lead vocals
- Jerry Cantrell – guitar, backing vocals
- Mike Starr – bass
- Sean Kinney – drums

== Charts ==
Weekly chart performance for "We Die Young"
Chart (2022)	Peak position
UK Physical Singles (OCC)	11
UK Vinyl Singles (OCC)	9
