= Music Bank (disambiguation) =

Music Bank is a South Korean music program by KBS.

Music Bank may also refer to:

- Music Bank World Tour, Music Bank television program global concert tour
- Music Bank (album), a box set by Alice in Chains
  - Music Bank: The Videos, a video release by Alice in Chains
