= Sunshine (Alice in Chains song) =

Song by Alice in Chains

from the album Facelift
- Released: August 28, 1990
- Genre: Grunge; funk metal
- Length: 4:44
- Label: Columbia
- Songwriter: Jerry Cantrell
- Producer: Dave Jerden

"Sunshine" is a song by the American rock band Alice in Chains and the eighth track on their debut album, Facelift (1990). The song was written by guitarist and vocalist Jerry Cantrell as a tribute to his mother Gloria, who died in 1987.

== Origin ==
Cantrell told Spin magazine in January 1991 that he wrote "Sunshine" about his mother's death. Cantrell told Spin:

When I was a little kid, I'd always tell her, "I'll be famous and buy you a house and you'll never have to work again. I'll take care of you like you took care of me.' When she passed away, it was a really shitty time for me. I didn't know how to deal with it then, and I still don't. But it gave me the impetus to do what I'm doing.

Cantrell wrote the song in Los Angeles after Alice in Chains had moved from Seattle to L.A. after the death of their friend Andrew Wood, lead vocalist of Mother Love Bone, and were in the middle of recording their first album, Facelift.

== Reception ==
Loudwire called the song "emotionally powerful", and that "Sunshine" "really left an emotional impact with many listeners as it came from a personal place for Cantrell." Classic Rock Review wrote; "A bright chorus of guitars make the verse section of 'Sunshine' unlike anything else on the album, although this track's chorus is a little more straightforward hard rock, with Cantrell singing some smooth backing vocals behind Staley's raspy throat."

== Live performances ==
The song was performed live for the first time during Alice in Chains' concert at the club Natacha's in Bremerton, Washington. The last time the band performed this song with original lead vocalist Layne Staley was on February 1, 1991 at the Off Ramp Cafe in Seattle, Washington.

Alice in Chains performed the song for the first time in 24 years at the Global Event Center at WinStar World Resort in Thackerville, Oklahoma on August 1, 2015, with new vocalist William DuVall replacing Staley.

== Personnel ==
- Layne Staley – lead vocals
- Jerry Cantrell – guitar, backing vocals
- Mike Starr – bass
- Sean Kinney – drums
