= Live Facelift =

Video and live album by Alice in Chains
- Released: July 30, 1991
- Recorded: December 22, 1990
- Venue: Moore Theatre (Seattle)
- Genre: Grunge; heavy metal; alternative metal; hard rock
- Length: 40:00
- Label: SMV Enterprises
- Director: Josh Taft
- Producer: Lisanne Dutton

Alice in Chains chronology
Live Facelift (1991)	The Nona Tapes (1995)

Live Facelift is a concert video and live album by the American rock band Alice in Chains, originally released on VHS on July 30, 1991, containing live footage of songs from their debut studio album, Facelift (1990), recorded at Moore Theatre in Seattle, Washington, on December 22, 1990. The video has been certified gold by the RIAA. The video was also released on Laserdisc in Japan on October 25, 1991.

Live Facelift was released on vinyl for the first time on November 25, 2016, by Columbia Records and Legacy Recordings, as part of Record Store Day's Black Friday event. Only 5,000 copies were issued. On September 15, 2017, the concert was released on red vinyl on a limited edition of only 1,000 copies, each coming with a commemorative reprint of the poster that advertised the concert date.

== Track listing ==
=== VHS ===
1. "Man in the Box" (Jerry Cantrell, Layne Staley)
2. "Real Thing" (Cantrell, Staley)
3. "Love, Hate, Love" (Cantrell, Staley)
4. "Sea of Sorrow" (Cantrell)
5. "Bleed the Freak" (Cantrell)
6. "We Die Young" (video) (Cantrell)
7. "Man in the Box" (video) (Cantrell, Staley)
8. "Sea of Sorrow" (video) (Cantrell)

=== Vinyl ===
Side A

1. "It Ain't Like That" (Cantrell, Mike Starr, Sean Kinney)
2. "Man in the Box" (Cantrell, Staley)
3. "Real Thing" (Cantrell, Staley)

Side B

1. "Love, Hate, Love" (Cantrell, Staley)
2. "Sea of Sorrow" (Cantrell)
3. "Bleed the Freak" (Cantrell)

== Personnel ==
Personnel taken from Live Facelift liner notes.

- Layne Staley – lead vocals
- Jerry Cantrell – guitar, backing vocals
- Mike Starr – bass
- Sean Kinney – drums, percussion, backing vocals

== Certifications ==
Region	Certification	Certified units/sales
United States (RIAA)	Gold	50,000^{^}
^{^} Shipments figures based on certification alone.
