= Bleed the Freak =

1991 single by Alice in Chains

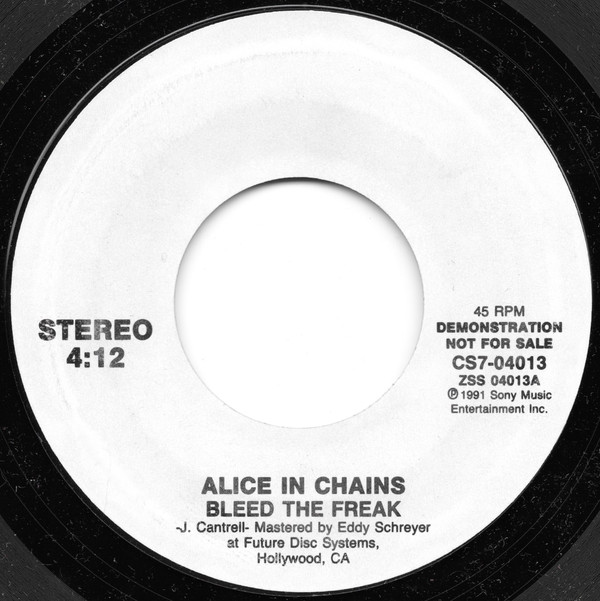
- US promotional vinyl single

Promotional single by Alice in Chains

from the album Facelift
- B-side: "Put You Down"
- Released: 1991
- Recorded: December 1989 – April 1990
- Studio: London Bridge, Seattle; Capitol Recording, Hollywood
- Genre: Grunge; heavy metal
- Length: 4:12
- Label: Columbia
- Songwriter: Jerry Cantrell
- Producer: Dave Jerden

Alice in Chains singles chronology
"Man in the Box" (1991)	"Bleed the Freak" (1991)	"Sea of Sorrow" (1991)

Music video
- "Bleed the Freak" on YouTube

"Bleed the Freak" is a song by American rock band Alice in Chains and the third single from their first album Facelift (1990). The single was released in vinyl format only. A demo version of the song was included on the box set Music Bank (1999).

== Lyrics ==
In the liner notes of 1999's Music Bank box set collection, guitarist Jerry Cantrell said of the song:

The song is us against the world, those people who put you down: "I put up with many years of you putting us down and watching us bleed, now I'd like to see you bleed some back."

== Music video ==
Leading up to the release of Live in 2000, footage from a 1990 performance of the song at the Moore Theatre in Seattle was used as a promotional music video. This same performance is taken from the home video release Live Facelift.

== Live performances ==
The song is a fan favourite and was frequently played as an opener for shows in 2006. A live performance of "Bleed the Freak" can be found on the live album Live. The same performance of the song is also included on the home video release Live Facelift.

== Track listing ==
All tracks are written by Jerry Cantrell.

Side A
No.	Title	Length
1.	"Bleed the Freak"	4:12

Side B
No.	Title	Length
1.	"Put You Down"	3:22

== Personnel ==
- Layne Staley – lead vocals
- Jerry Cantrell – guitar, backing vocals
- Mike Starr – bass
- Sean Kinney – drums

== Certifications ==
Region	Certification	Certified units/sales
New Zealand (RMNZ)	Gold	15,000^{‡}
^{‡} Sales+streaming figures based on certification alone.
