= Sea of Sorrow =

1991 single by Alice in Chains

- U.S. CD promotional single

Promotional single by Alice in Chains

from the album Facelift
- Released: 1991
- Recorded: December 1989 – April 1990
- Studio: London Bridge Studio, Seattle & Capitol Recording Studio, Hollywood
- Genre: Heavy metal
- Length: 5:49 (album); 3:37 (radio edit)
- Label: Columbia
- Songwriter: Jerry Cantrell
- Producer: Dave Jerden

Alice in Chains singles chronology
"Bleed the Freak" (1991)	"Sea of Sorrow" (1991)	"Would?" (1992)

Music video
- "Sea of Sorrow" on YouTube

"Sea of Sorrow" is a song by the American rock band Alice in Chains, featured on their debut full-length album Facelift (1990). The song was included on the compilation album The Essential Alice in Chains (2006). A demo version of the song was included on the box set Music Bank (1999).

== Release and reception ==
"Sea of Sorrow" peaked at number 27 on the Billboard Mainstream Rock Tracks chart. "Sea of Sorrow" was a moderate success and is still occasionally played on alternative rock radio stations.

Ned Raggett of AllMusic said that the song "showed that even as a fairly young group Alice in Chains wanted to fool around with expectations at least a bit" and that "just about every member gets a little moment of flair on the track."

== Music video ==
Two music videos for the single were created. In both videos, about two minutes are cut from the song. The second part of guitarist Jerry Cantrell's solo is eliminated, as is the second verse.

=== Original video ===
The first version was directed by Paul Rachman, who had previously directed the "Man in the Box" music video for the band. The first (and ultimately discarded) version is in color and features the band playing in multicolored spotlights. Vocalist Layne Staley also has most of his dreadlocks cut off, but some intact, giving him an odd hairstyle. The video is available on the home video release Live Facelift.

=== Official video ===
The second version, directed by Martyn Atkins, was the one the band eventually decided to release and is shot mostly in black and white. Segments from the color video are used in the later black and white one, often glowing momentarily into color from monochrome. There was some editing involved to make the final video appear seamless, as Staley has the half-dreadlock hairstyle in the color video, but shorter and more even cut in the second. The video is available on the home video release Music Bank: The Videos.

== Live performances ==
A performance of "Sea of Sorrow" is included on the home video release Live Facelift.

== Track listing ==
No.	Title	Length
1.	"Sea of Sorrow" (edit)	4:34
2.	"Sea of Sorrow"	5:49

== Personnel ==
All credits for "Sea of Sorrow" are adapted form the single's liner notes, as well as the liner notes for Facelift.

Alice In Chains

- Layne Staley – lead vocals
- Jerry Cantrell – guitar, backing vocals
- Mike Starr – bass, additional backng vocals
- Sean Kinney – drums, piano, additional backing vocals

Technical personnel

- Dave Jerden – production, recording and mixing
- Mike Corbett – editing (radio edit)
- Nick Terzo – editing (radio edit)
- Ron Champagne – additional engineering
- Bob Lacivita – assistant mixing engineer
- Eddy Schreyer – mastering

== Chart positions ==
Chart (1991)	Peak position
US Mainstream Rock Airplay (Billboard)	27
