= Live (Alice in Chains album) =

Live album by Alice in Chains
- Released: December 5, 2000
- Recorded: 1990, 1993, 1996
- Genres: Grunge; alternative metal; heavy metal
- Length: 66:09
- Label: Columbia
- Producers: Tony Wilson; Peter Fletcher

Alice in Chains chronology
Music Bank (1999)	Live (2000)	Greatest Hits (2001)

Professional ratings
Aggregate scores
Source	Rating
Metacritic	80/100
Review scores
Source	Rating
AllMusic	3/5 stars
The Rolling Stone Album Guide	3/5 stars

Live is a live album by the American rock band Alice in Chains. It was released on December 5, 2000, through Columbia Records. The live version of "Man in the Box" featured on the album was released as a single. The album is composed of songs recorded live in 1990, 1993, and 1996.

== Overview ==
Live was the band's only live album other than the acoustic album Unplugged. While most of the songs on Live had been released on previous albums, "Queen of the Rodeo" had not; although, the same live performance had been released on the Music Bank box set. Live includes five songs ("Them Bones", "God Am", "Again", "A Little Bitter" and "Dam That River") from the band's final two shows with vocalist Layne Staley.

== Reception ==
The album received generally positive reviews from most critics, with Greg Prato of AllMusic writing in his review of the album "Their detuned sound and tales from the darkside are even more sinister and gripping on the concert stage, as evidenced by this 14-track set."

== Track listing ==
No.	Title	Writer(s)	Length
1.	"Bleed the Freak" (December 22, 1990, Moore Theatre, Seattle)	Jerry Cantrell	4:33
2.	"Queen of the Rodeo" (November 5, 1990, Dallas)	Jett Silver, Layne Staley	4:39
3.	"Angry Chair" (March 2, 1993, Glasgow Barrowland, Glasgow, UK)	Staley	4:22
4.	"Man in the Box" (March 2, 1993, Glasgow Barrowland, Glasgow, UK)	Staley, Cantrell, Mike Starr, Sean Kinney (Note: The song was credited to Staley/Cantrell/Starr/Kinney in the album's liner notes, despite only being credited to Staley and Cantrell in the liner notes to Facelift.)	4:59/4:48 unmarked reissue
5.	"Love, Hate, Love" (March 2, 1993, Glasgow Barrowland, Glasgow, UK)	Cantrell, Staley	7:47
6.	"Rooster" (March 2, 1993, Glasgow Barrowland, Glasgow, UK)	Cantrell	6:54
7.	"Would?" (March 2, 1993, Glasgow Barrowland, Glasgow, UK)	Cantrell	3:51
8.	"Junkhead" (March 2, 1993, Glasgow Barrowland, Glasgow, UK)	Cantrell, Staley	5:21
9.	"Dirt (Drunk and Disorderly version)" (October 24, 1993, Nagoya, Japan)	Cantrell, Staley	5:24
10.	"Them Bones" (July 2, 1996, Kiel Center, St. Louis, Missouri)	Cantrell	2:39
11.	"God Am" (July 2, 1996, Kiel Center, St. Louis, Missouri)	Cantrell, Mike Inez, Kinney, Staley	3:59
12.	"Again" (July 3, 1996, Kemper Arena, Kansas City, Missouri)	Cantrell, Staley	4:24
13.	"A Little Bitter" (July 3, 1996, Kemper Arena, Kansas City, Missouri)	Cantrell, Inez, Kinney, Staley	3:52
14.	"Dam That River" (July 3, 1996, Kemper Arena, Kansas City, Missouri)	Cantrell	3:33
Total length:			66:09

== Personnel ==
Alice in Chains

- Layne Staley – lead vocals (all tracks), rhythm guitar (track 3)
- Jerry Cantrell – lead guitar (all tracks), vocals (all tracks)
- Sean Kinney – drums (all tracks), packaging concepts
- Mike Inez – bass (tracks 3–14)
- Mike Starr – bass (tracks 1–2)

Production

- Peter Fletcher – compilation producer
- Elliot Bailey – mix engineer (tracks 1, 10–14)
- Toby Wright – mix engineer (tracks 1, 10–14)
- Mark Naficy – recording and mix engineer (tracks 2, 9)
- Mike Walter – engineer (tracks 3–8)
- Tony Wilson – BBC producer (tracks 3–8)
- Stephen Marcussen – mastering
- Mary Maurer – art direction, design
- Brandy Flower – design
- Happenstance – design
- Marty Temme – photography

== Charts ==
=== Album ===
Chart (2000)	Peak position
US Billboard 200	142

=== Singles ===
Year	Single	US Main peak chart position
2000	"Man in the Box" (live)	39
