= Facelift (album) =

Studio album by Alice in Chains
- Released: August 21, 1990
- Recorded: December 1989 – April 1990
- Studios: London Bridge (Seattle); Capitol (Hollywood)
- Genres: Grunge; heavy metal; alternative metal; hard rock
- Length: 54:02
- Label: Columbia
- Producer: Dave Jerden

Alice in Chains chronology
We Die Young (1990)	Facelift (1990)	Sap (1992)

Singles from Facelift
- 1. "We Die Young" Released: July 1990; 2. "Man in the Box" Released: January 1991

Facelift is the debut studio album by the American rock band Alice in Chains, released by Columbia Records on August 21, 1990. The tracks "We Die Young", and "Man in the Box" were released as singles. "Man in the Box" was nominated for a Grammy Award for Best Hard Rock Performance with Vocal in 1992. Facelift became the first grunge album to be certified gold by the Recording Industry Association of America (RIAA), achieving this feat on September 11, 1991. The album peaked at No. 42 on the Billboard 200 chart, and has been certified triple-platinum by the RIAA for shipments of three million copies in the United States.

== Background and recording ==
Local promoter Randy Hauser became aware of Alice in Chains at a concert, and offered to pay for demo recordings. However, one day before the band was due to record at the Music Bank studio in Washington, police shut down the studio during the biggest marijuana raid in the state's history. The final demo – dubbed The Treehouse Tapes – found its way to managers Kelly Curtis and Susan Silver, who also managed the Seattle-based Soundgarden. Curtis and Silver passed the demo to Columbia Records' A&R representative Nick Terzo, who set up an appointment with label president Don Ienner. Based on The Treehouse Tapes (sold by the band at shows), Ienner signed Alice in Chains to Columbia in 1989.

Alice in Chains became a top priority for the label, who released the band's first official recording in July 1990: the promotional EP We Die Young. Its lead single and title song became a hit on metal radio. After its success, the label rushed Alice in Chains' debut album into production with producer Dave Jerden. "I told Jerry Cantrell, 'Metallica took Tony Iommi and sped him up. What you've done is you've slowed him down again,'" Jerden recalled. "He looked at me and said, 'You got it.' That's how I got the gig."

Drummer Sean Kinney claims to have played this album with a broken hand:

I almost didn't play on the record - they started rehearsing with the drummer from Mother Love Bone, Greg Gilmore. I was sitting there playing with one hand, guiding him through it. Dave Jerden came in and they started to try to do it. He was like, 'Screw it - pull the plug. This is not going to be the same.' Luckily, we took a tiny bit of time off. I had that cast on for a while, and was like, 'I can't miss this.' I cut my cast off in the studio and kept a bucket of ice by the drum set. Kept my hand iced down and played with a broken hand. I tried not to do that again - your first big break, and you fuck it up.

Facelift was recorded at London Bridge Studio in Seattle and at Capitol Studios in Hollywood from December 1989 to April 1990. Footage from the Facelift sessions can be found on Alice in Chains' Music Bank: The Videos DVD.

== Music and lyrics ==
Guitarist Jerry Cantrell stated the album was intended to have a "moody aura" that was a "direct result of the brooding atmosphere and feel of Seattle." Regarding the music for "Man in the Box", Cantrell said in the 1999 Music Bank box set, "That whole beat and grind of that is when we started to find ourselves; it helped Alice become what it was." The idea of using a voice box in the song came from producer Dave Jerden, who was driving to the studio one day when Bon Jovi's "Livin' on a Prayer" started playing on the radio.

Cantrell also credited "I Can't Remember" for helping the band find its sound. "It Ain't Like That" came out of a riff that Cantrell cited as a mistake, however he called it "a cool mistake."

Cantrell called "Love, Hate, Love" the "masterpiece of that record," adding about the song that Staley's vocals are "amazing" and that it features one of his favorite guitar solos he ever performed.

Regarding the lyrical content, Cantrell said he wrote "We Die Young" after "riding the bus to rehearsal and [seeing] all these 9, 10, 11 year old kids with beepers dealing drugs. The sight of a 10 year old kid with a beeper and a cell phone dealing drugs equaled "We Die Young" to me." In a recorded interview with MuchMusic USA, vocalist Layne Staley stated that the lyrics for "Man in the Box" are about censorship in the mass media, and "I was really stoned when I wrote it."

Discussing "Bleed the Freak", Cantrell stated that the lyrics represent "us against the world, those people who put you down."

Cantrell wrote "Sunshine" about his mother's death. Facelift was dedicated to her memory.

Staley's "Sexual chocolate, baby!" scream at the end of "Real Thing" was a reference to the film Coming to America starring Eddie Murphy, whose character was the singer of a band called Sexual Chocolate.

== Outtakes and non-album tracks ==
"Killing Yourself" is the B-side to the 1990 "We Die Young" vinyl single.

Demos for the songs "I Can't Have You Blues", "Whatcha Gonna Do", "Social Parasite", "Bleed the Freak", "Sea of Sorrow", and "Killing Yourself" were featured on Alice in Chains' 1988 demo tape. Remixes of these recordings were later included on the band's 1999 box set, Music Bank. A demo of "We Die Young" from the same sessions was released exclusively on their 1999 greatest hits album, Nothing Safe: Best of the Box.

Further 1988 demos of the songs "Chemical Addiction", "Fairytale Love Story", "Queen of the Rodeo", "Bite the Bullet", "King of the Kats", "I Can't Remember", "Sunshine", "The Real Thing", and "Suffragette City" are available as bootleg recordings. A live version of "Queen of the Rodeo" features on the 2000 live album Live as well as the Music Bank box set. Regarding the songs on the 1988 demo tape, Cantrell said, "I guess with all those songs we were 'discovering' ourselves."

== Packaging and title ==
In an interview with Video Metal Sheet in 1991, Jerry Cantrell said that the original idea for the album cover was "an embryonic-type thing" representing the birth of the band. But it ended up taking more of a scary overtone and fitting quite well with the music.

The band discussed several ideas for the album art with photographer Rocky Schenck. One of those ideas was making it appear as if they were emerging from an eyeball. Columbia Records did not give the band a large budget for the photoshoot, but Schenck liked them so much that he was willing to make it work. The budget was barely enough for a one-day shoot, but Schenck stretched it out for over three days. The first day of shoot took place on May 2, 1990, at the swimming pool of the Oakwood Apartments in Burbank, California. The pool was covered with a thin piece of plastic to give the idea that the band was emerging from an eyeball. They had to swim under the plastic, rise to the surface and breathe in as they emerged, so the plastic distorted their faces. One of the photos from that session included a shot of Layne Staley wrapped in plastic with the other members holding him, which was used as the cover for the "We Die Young" single.

Schenck was experimenting with in-camera multiple exposures, where he would create a distorted image by exposing different parts of a single frame of film one exposure at a time, a technique that he had been using for years in his videos and art photography. The band had seen Schenck's portfolio of black and white portraits of haunted, distorted faces, and asked him to duplicate the technique. Schenck did not want to duplicate the original black and white photo, so he tried the same technique in color using photos of each band member's face. A photo of bassist Mike Starr was chosen as the album cover. After seeing the photo, the band decided to name the album Facelift. The original concept for the cover was to have all four members' faces superimposed into one startling expression, which appeared years later in the Music Bank box set.

== Release and reception ==
Professional ratings
Review scores
Source	Rating
AllMusic	3.5/5 stars
Chicago Tribune	2.5/4 stars
Classic Rock	4.5/5 stars
The Encyclopedia of Popular Music	3/5 stars
The Great Rock Discography	6/10
MusicHound Rock	2/5 stars
Music Story	3/5 stars
The Rolling Stone Album Guide	3/5 stars
Spin Alternative Record Guide	4/10
Sputnikmusic	4/5

Facelift was released on August 28, 1990, peaking at No. 42 in the summer of 1991 on the Billboard 200 chart. It was the first album from the grunge movement to reach the top 50 in America on the Billboard 200, and the first to be certified gold by the Recording Industry Association of America on September 11, 1991, followed by Nirvana's Nevermind on November 27, 1991.

Facelift included two retail singles ("We Die Young" and "Man in the Box") and two promotional singles ("Bleed the Freak" and Sea of Sorrow"), all of which had accompanying music videos. The album was a critical success, with Steve Huey of AllMusic citing Facelift as "one of the most important records in establishing an audience for grunge and alternative rock among hard rock and heavy metal listeners."

Facelift was not an instant success, selling under 40,000 copies in the first six months of release, until MTV added "Man in the Box" to regular daytime rotation.

"Man in the Box" hit No. 18 on Billboard's Album Rock Tracks chart, with the album's second promotional single, "Sea of Sorrow", peaking at No. 27, and in six weeks Facelift sold 400,000 copies in the United States.

Alice in Chains was nominated for a Best Hard Rock Performance with Vocal Grammy Award in 1992 for "Man in the Box", but lost to Van Halen for their 1991 album For Unlawful Carnal Knowledge. The music video for "Man in the Box" was nominated for Best Heavy Metal/Hard Rock Video at the 1991 MTV Video Music Awards. The album won Best Debut Album at the 1991 Foundations Forum.

== Legacy ==
In June 2017, Ozzy Osbourne listed Facelift as one of his "10 Favorite Metal Albums". In April 2019, the album was ranked No. 14 on Rolling Stone's "50 Greatest Grunge Albums" list. Soundgarden lead guitarist Kim Thayil also picked Facelift as one of his favorite Grunge albums.

In 2020, Paste named Facelift the 13th best album of 1990. Staff writer Jade Gomez said: "Capturing the bleakness of Seattle in the late '80s and early '90s, Facelift is one of the more realized debut albums of the grunge era, contrary to the band's worries of being unable to find their sound. [...] It's a haunting, distorted, ear-shattering exploration of pain that bridged the gap between heavy metal and grunge fans, and cemented Alice in Chains as one of the most important bands in history."

== Tour ==
The band continued to hone its audience, opening for such artists as Iggy Pop, Van Halen, Poison, and Extreme. In early 1991, Alice in Chains landed the opening slot for the Clash of the Titans with Anthrax, Megadeth, and Slayer, exposing the band to a wide metal audience. During the tour the band found themselves subject to some hostile audiences; however, Anthrax bassist Frank Bello recalls them earning the respect of others by standing up for themselves: "If there was a guy starting shit, Layne would jump into the audience and beat the FUCK outta that guy!" Michael Christopher of PopMatters observed "With 1990's Facelift, before Nirvana blew the scene wide open, Seattle's Alice in Chains were getting a metal push, thrown on tour with the likes of Slayer and Megadeth, repeatedly booed off stage in a genre where they didn't belong." The band later released the video compilation Live Facelift, which was filmed at the Moore Theatre in 1990.

== Track listing ==
All music and lyrics are written by Jerry Cantrell, except where noted.

Facelift track listing
No.	Title	Lyrics	Music	Length
1.	"We Die Young"			2:32
2.	"Man in the Box"	Layne Staley		4:46
3.	"Sea of Sorrow"			5:49
4.	"Bleed the Freak"			4:01
5.	"I Can't Remember"	Staley; Cantrell		3:42
6.	"Love, Hate, Love"	Staley		6:26
7.	"It Ain't Like That"		Cantrell; Mike Starr; Sean Kinney	4:37
8.	"Sunshine"			4:44
9.	"Put You Down"			3:16
10.	"Confusion"	Staley	Cantrell; Starr	5:44
11.	"I Know Somethin (Bout You)"			4:22
12.	"Real Thing"	Staley		4:03
Total length:				54:02

== Personnel ==
All personnel credits for Facelift are adapted from the album's liner notes.

Alice in Chains

- Layne Staley – vocals
- Jerry Cantrell – guitar, backing vocals, talkbox on "Man in the Box"
- Mike Starr – bass, backing vocals on "Confusion", additional backing vocals
- Sean Kinney – drums, percussion, additional backing vocals, piano on "Sea of Sorrow"

Additional personnel

- Kevin Shuss – additional backing vocals

Production

- Dave Jerden – producer, recording, mixing
- Ron Champagne – additional engineering
- Leslie Ann Jones – assistant engineering
- Bob Lacivita – assistant mix engineering
- Eddy Schreyer – mastering

== Charts ==
Weekly chart performance for original release
Chart (1990–1991)	Peak position
US Billboard 200	42

Weekly chart performance for 30th anniversary edition
Chart (2021)	Peak position
German Albums (Offizielle Top 100)	41
Italian Vinyl Records (FIMI)	88
US Top Album Sales (Billboard)	27
US Top Alternative Albums (Billboard)	11
US Top Hard Rock Albums (Billboard)	9
US Top Rock Albums (Billboard)	24

== Certifications ==
Certifications for Facelift
Region	Certification	Certified units/sales
New Zealand (RMNZ)	Gold	7,500^{‡}
United Kingdom (BPI)	Silver	60,000^{‡}
United States (RIAA)	3× Platinum	3,000,000^{‡}
^{‡} Sales+streaming figures based on certification alone.
