= Marcus Charles =

American businessman

Marcus Charles (born November 13, 1973) is an American restaurateur and entrepreneur in Seattle, Washington. He is known for fostering and expanding the Capitol Hill Block Party, resurrecting the Crocodile Cafe music venue, and founding Neumos Crystal Ball Reading Room, along with multiple, successful Seattle bars and restaurants. In 2012, he was a recipient of the Puget Sound Business Journal's "40 Under 40" award.

== Businesses ==
- 1997: Marcus' Martini Heaven opens in Pioneer Square
- 1999: Bad Juju Lounge opens on Capitol Hill
- 2001: Takes over Capitol Hill Block Party with Dave Meinert (sells shares in 2012)
- 2001: Jack's Road House opens on Capitol Hill
- 2003: Neumos Crystal Ball Reading Room opens on Capitol Hill, with partner Jerry Everard
- 2005: Spitfire opens in Belltown, with partners Jerry Everard and Jonathan Sposato
- 2005–2006: Sells all businesses except Capitol Hill Block Party
- 2008: Juju opens in Belltown
- 2008: The Crocodile is purchased and renovated in Belltown before reopening in 2009
- 2011: Local 360 Cafe & Bar opens in Belltown
- 2013: Sells Juju space to cannabis dispensary
- 2014: Bell + Whete European Kitchen & Lounge opens in Belltown
- 2016: Bell + Whete closes for renovations before reopening as Belltown Brewing in 2017

=== Cannabis & Juju Joints ===
In 2013, Charles co-founded Juju Joints with Rick Stevens of Seattle. Juju Joints are disposable electronic joints (e-joints) pre-loaded with cannabis oil and THC and allow for discreet, odorless consumption of cannabis. Juju Joints launched in Washington cannabis dispensaries in April 2014. Stevens, a 30-year tobacco industry veteran, developed the technology for the innovative e-joint, alongside Charles.

== Politics ==
Politically active in local and national campaigns, Charles immersed himself in the 2012 elections, simultaneously supporting Democratic incumbent President Barack Obama in the presidential race, and Washington State gubernatorial Republican candidate Rob McKenna. Charles voiced his political opinions in various interviews with Seattle publications including The Stranger.
