= Capitol Hill Block Party =

Seattle music event

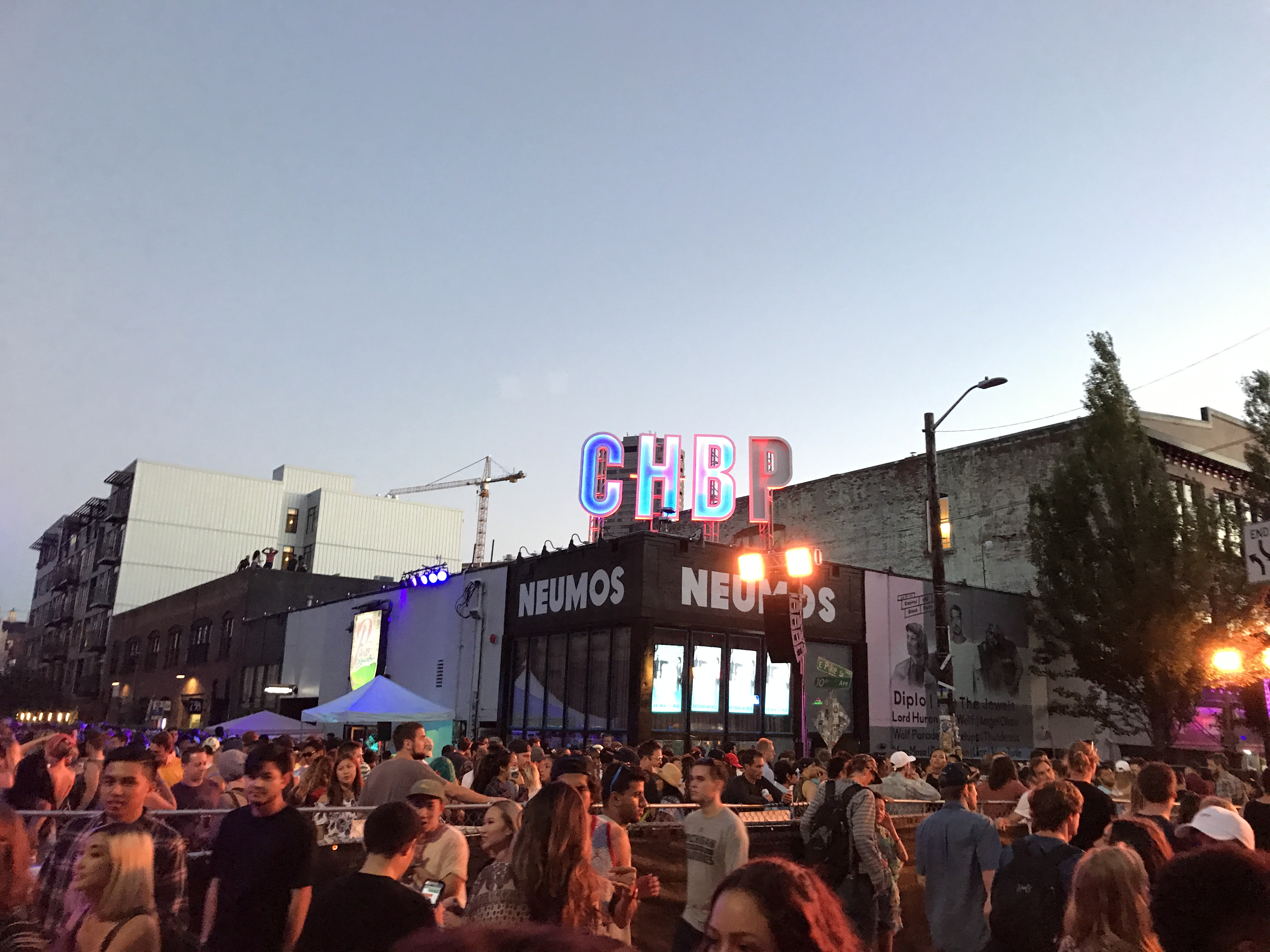
- Capitol Hill Block Party; Crowd near Neumos at the 2017 event
- Genre: Variety
- Dates: Late July
- Locations: Capitol Hill, Seattle, Washington, U.S.
- Years active: 1997–2020, 2022-Present
- Founders: Jen Gapay
- Website: www.capitolhillblockparty.com

The Capitol Hill Block Party is an annual three-day music festival and block party held each July in the Capitol Hill neighborhood of Seattle, Washington, United States. Performance genres include pop, R&B, indie rock, punk, EDM, and many more. The festival has featured numerous famous acts over the years including Macklemore, Mudhoney, The Presidents of the United States of America, Jack White, Sonic Youth, Lizzo, RL Grime, and Amine. The festival has attracted several major brand sponsorships and even created a donation program for several non-profit organizations. The main events of the festival are located on Pike Street and Pine Street, however, the crowds and foot traffic branch out into more of the neighboring streets, causing friction with nearby businesses and residents. Although the festival is largely known for its musical performances, the block party also includes free events, such as yoga and a skate competition, located at the Cal Anderson Park.

Capitol Hill Block Party was canceled in 2020 and 2021 to comply with social distancing mandates imposed during the COVID-19 pandemic.

== History ==
Founded in 1997 by Jen Gapay, the festival was originally a one-day event with just one stage, five bands, and a couple of DJs. Gapay continued to produce the party until 2000, when David Meinert and Marcus Charles took over, adding a second stage and then a second day in 2001. Beginning to market the festival as an "event", the new owners earned a sponsorship from The Stranger and began to charge $8 per ticket for admission. The event presented over 20 bands and had roughly 3,000 people present at the two day festival. Initially as an extension on a trial basis by the Seattle special events office, the festival became a three-day event from 2010; overall attendance that year was estimated at 30,000 people.

Talent buyer Jason Lajeunesse took ownership of Capitol Hill Block Party in 2011 as the CEO of local entertainment company Daydream State. In 2012, notable efforts were made to reduce the event's negative impact on the revenue of local businesses through marketing at the festival. Under Lajeunesse's ownership, he strives to use this event as an opportunity for small, local bands to gain exposure in front of large audiences. Through the most recent event in 2019, the festival has managed to book large notable artists, but continues to make an effort to dedicate 65-70% of the lineup to local artists. The event later expanded to showcase over 120 acts over the span of seven stages.

The 2025 edition of the Capitol Hill Block Party was reduced to two days and restricted to attendees over the age of 21.

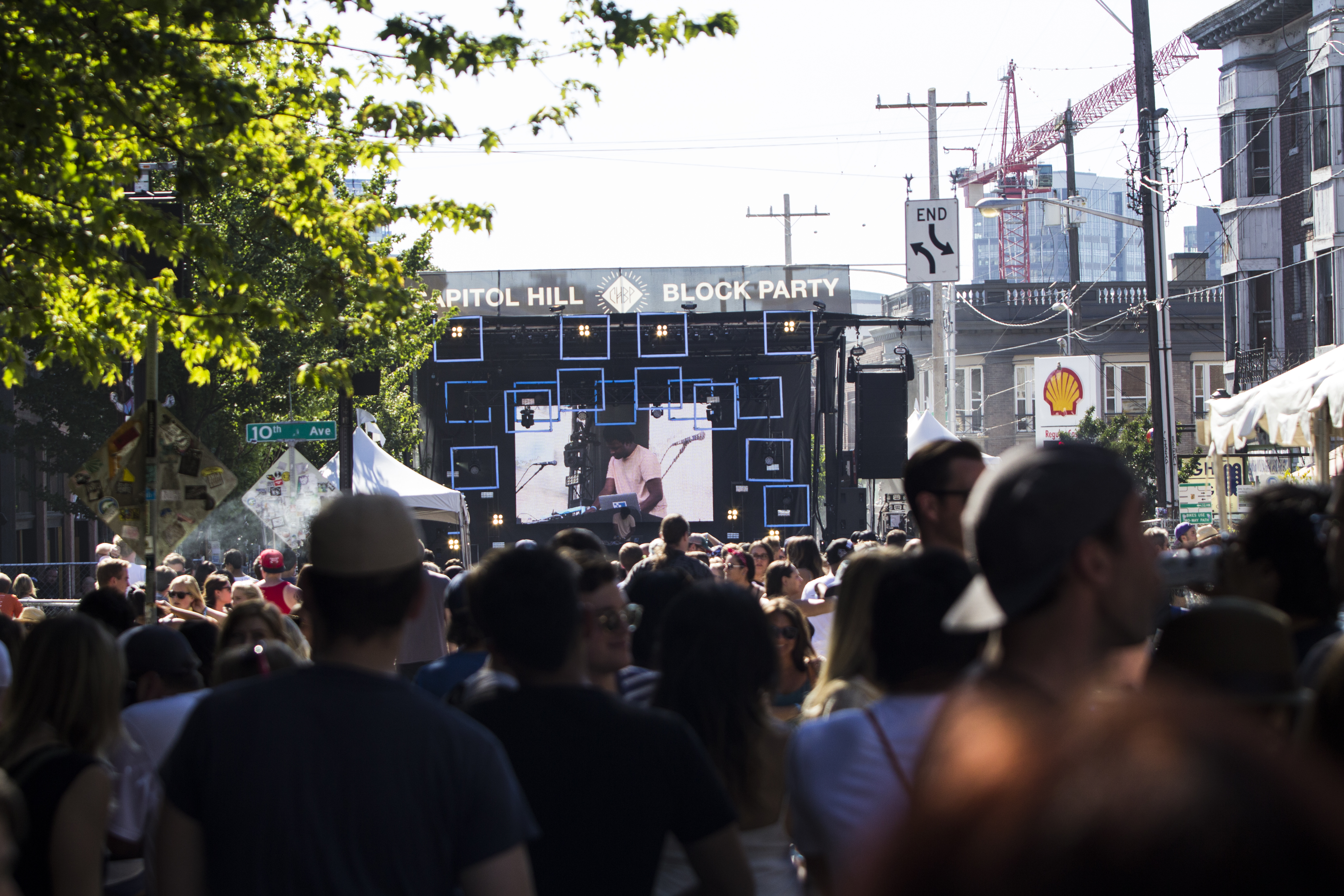
Main stage of the Capitol Hill Block Party in 2014

=== Tickets and pricing ===
In the initial years of the block party, admission to the gathering was free. Starting in 2001, tickets cost $8 to attend the event. As the party expanded to a three-day event in 2010, tickets were priced at $23 for a single day pass or $60 for admission to all three days, sold on The Stranger's website. In 2015, ticket prices for the three-day pass increased depending on date of purchase, beginning with a cost of $99 through April 2 for those interested in purchasing tickets early prior to the release of the full lineup, rising to $125 per pass purchased before July 4, and tickets purchased between July 5 and the beginning of the festival cost $150. VIP passes, including free gifts and access to the VIP beer garden, cost $250 for the three-day pass. In 2019, tickets to the event cost $70 for a one-day pass and starting prices for three-day passes cost $160. Options for VIP passes and two-day passes were also available for purchase through the event's website, where all official ticket sales are held.

== Sponsors and donations ==
Major sponsors of the block party include AT&T (via their Capitol Hill-based store The Lounge by AT&T), Jones Soda, the ACLU, and The Stranger. In 2013, the festival offered an option to donate to the local non-profit, 12th Avenue Arts project, when purchasing a ticket to the event. Capitol Hill Block Party matched donations up to a total of $5000, and in 2019, the producers reopened the same matching donations program for non-profits Jubilee Women’s Center, The Vera Project, Artists for Progress, and Lifelong.

== Controversy ==
The three day event has received criticism and protestations due to its effects on local businesses located within the festival's borders. Complaints regarding the event begin to circulate regarding the significant decrease in sales that many businesses experience throughout the duration of the festival. In 2019, despite increased visitation to the area, 39% businesses surveyed for the Capitol Hill Special Events assessment claimed that business decreased as a result of the event. The quality of interaction with businesses in this area, including vandalism and littering, have been further areas for complaint; there have been instances of trespassers attempting to use the properties of nearby shops to illegally enter the festival. Parking and traffic also contribute to the concerns of the businesses that were surveyed. Likewise, residents within and near the party grounds complain of loud noise preventing them from being able to sleep through the late hours of the event.

Much customer dissatisfaction regarding the event stems from concerns for accessibility and physical safety. The increase in quantity of tickets for the block party have become a common complaint. Growing audience sizes, especially for popular acts, have raised safety concerns, most infamously at Chappell Roan's 2024 set. Temporary boundaries erected during the festival have also been cited as a safety issue and an impediment to the visibility of local businesses.
