= Don Ienner =

American music executive

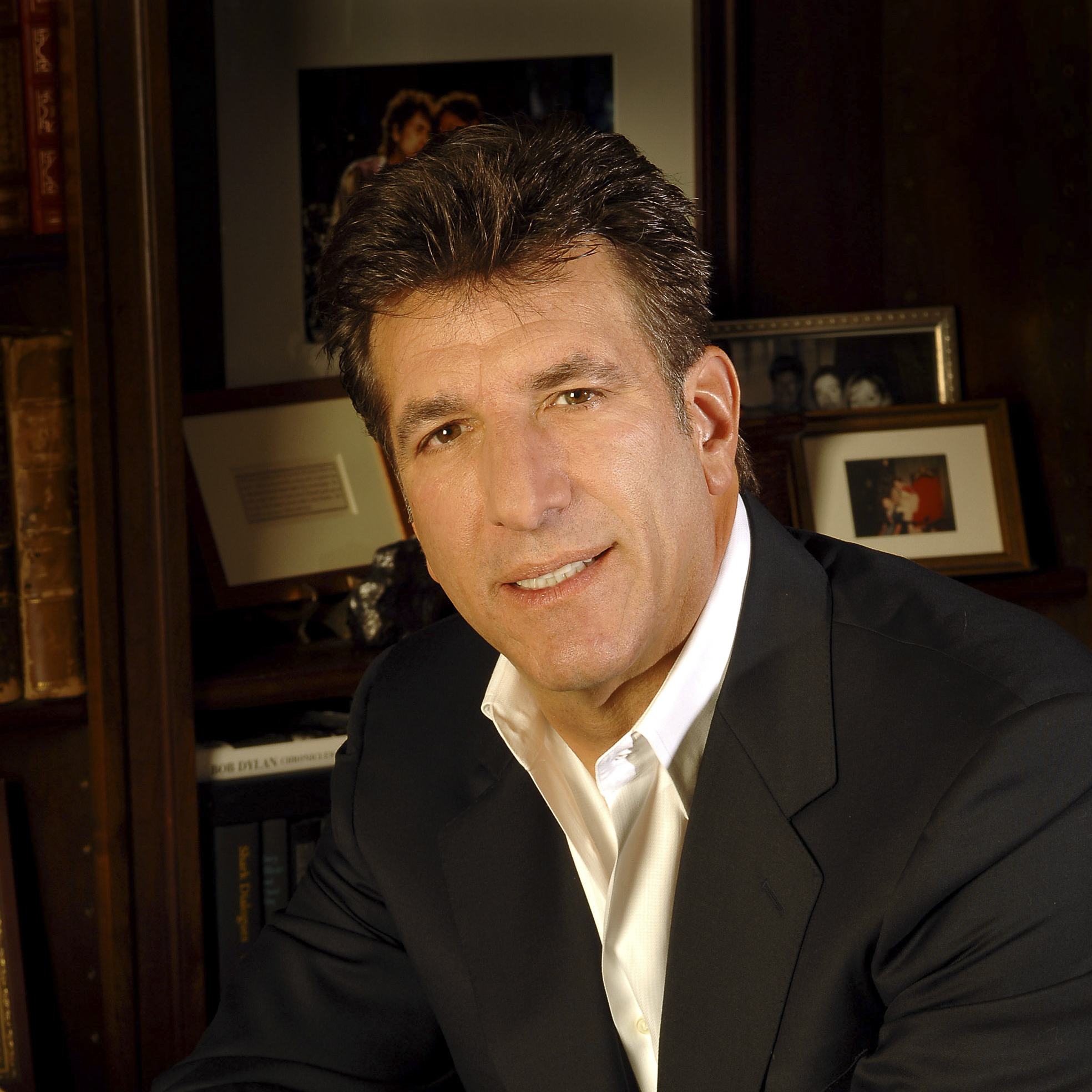
- Born: 1951 or 1952 (age 74–75)
- Occupation: Music executive
- Known for: President of Columbia Records
- Labels: Columbia; Epic; Sony Nashville; Sony Urban; Arista; Millennium

Don Ienner (/ˈaɪnər/ EYE-nər; born 1951/1952) is an American music executive. He served as president of Columbia Records from 1989 to 2003, and as chairman from 1994 to 2003. In April 2003 he became president of Columbia's umbrella company, Sony Music U.S., overseeing its music labels, and was named chief executive officer of Sony Music Label Group, U.S. in 2004. He resigned from that position on June 1, 2006.

As of 2012, Ienner was a music business consultant and a principal in an advertising agency.

== Career ==
=== Early career ===
In 1969, Ienner began his career in the music industry by taking a job in the mailroom of Capitol Records while still in high school. From 1972 to 1977, Ienner and his brother Jimmy ran a music production, management, and publishing company called C.A.M. U.S.A., which worked with such artists as Three Dog Night, Grand Funk Railroad, Blood, Sweat & Tears, and Eric Carmen. While producing a record for Blood, Sweat & Tears, Ienner met Clive Davis, then head of Columbia.

In 1977, he co-founded Millennium Records with his brother, serving as executive president.

=== Arista Records ===
Ienner joined Arista Records in 1983 as vice president of promotion. In 1988, then-president Clive Davis appointed Ienner to executive vice president and general manager. Ienner became particularly well known for this promotion and marketing of Whitney Houston, who had a historic seven consecutive #1 Billboard Hot 100 hits during the 1980s.

Other notable promotional activity included a 1988 commentary Ienner wrote for Billboard, which initiated the "When You Play It, Say It" campaign. The campaign urged radio stations to identify the artist's name before or after a song was played, a growing problem for all record companies.

=== Columbia Records & Sony Music ===
In 1989, at the age of 36, Ienner was hired by Sony Music Chairman Thomas D. Mottola as president of Columbia Records, the youngest executive ever to head the record label. At the time, Columbia, which had been bought by Japanese Sony Corp. in November 1987, was losing market share. The label was also seen as falling behind the times. In 1990, the hard-rock band Warrant dedicated the title song of its album "Cherry Pie" to Ienner.

Ienner led Columbia in the signing of alternative groups Alice in Chains and Toad the Wet Sprocket, and brought on Jermaine Dupri's So So Def Recordings and Chris Schwartz's Ruffhouse Records, which carried the Fugees and Cypress Hill.

In December 1990, Ienner announced a $10,000 contribution from Columbia to the Mount Zion-Robert Johnson Memorial Fund with an additional $7,000 given one month later. A portion of the money was used to erect a memorial to blues musician Robert Johnson in the Mount Zion church's cemetery in Morgan City, Mississippi.

Between 1989 and 2001 Ienner “transformed Sony’s Columbia division from a washed-up pop monolith into a muscular hit-making machine,” according to the Los Angeles Times. Under his auspices the label re-established itself as a force in rock, rap, and R&B. Revenue went from $300 million in 1989 to $730 million in 2000. Bob Dylan called Ienner an “unstoppable force.”

In 1994, Ienner was promoted to chairman of Columbia Records (while retaining his title as president), which he held until 2003. In seven of the 13 years that he served as president—the longest tenure of anyone to hold that title—Columbia was the No. 1 record label.

In 2001, Ienner signed Train and promoted their second album Drops of Jupiter, which was certified double platinum, with the single "Drops of Jupiter" from the album winning two Grammy Awards in 2002.

In 2003, Ienner was named chairman of Sony Music U.S., overseeing all of Sony's music labels, including Columbia, Epic, Sony Music Nashville, and Sony Urban Music. In his new capacity, Ienner oversaw the revitalization of the company's Nashville labels by signing new artists Gretchen Wilson and Miranda Lambert.

Ienner invested in the use of technology to predict hit songs. In 2003, during work on Beyoncé’s first solo album, there was a disagreement between Beyoncé and Ienner about what the first single should be. Ienner sent several tracks from the album to be tested by the company Hit Predictor, which determined that “Crazy in Love” was the best choice. “Crazy in Love” became a major hit, winning two Grammies in 2004.

In June 2006, Ienner left as chairman of Sony Music Label Group U.S. after 18 years at Sony and less than three years after being promoted to chairman. After leaving Sony, Ienner became principal at IMO Entertainment, and an artist manager and consultant to Universal Music.

In 2010, Ienner founded cloud-based social content player IMHO Media.

Ienner, together with John Hamlin, managed the band Hot Chelle Rae in 2011.

In a 2017 interview with Howard Stern, singer-songwriter John Mellencamp said that he left Columbia Records because the president of the company made a racist remark to Mellencamp's manager in 2001. British singer George Michael claimed to have overheard Ienner referring to him as a "faggot", triggering the singer's 1994 legal effort to dissolve his contract with Columbia. Michael lost the case and Ienner denied using the term.
