= Long Gone Day =

Single by Mad Season

from the album Above
- Released: 1995
- Recorded: 1994
- Studio: Bad Animals, Seattle, Washington
- Genre: Alternative rock; blues rock; jazz rock
- Length: 4:52
- Label: Columbia
- Songwriter(s): Barrett Martin, Mike McCready, Layne Staley, Mark Lanegan
- Producer(s): Brett Eliason, Mad Season

Mad Season singles chronology
| "I Don't Know Anything" (1995) | "Long Gone Day" (1995) |

"Long Gone Day" is a song by the American rock band Mad Season, released in 1995 as the third single from the band's sole studio album, Above (1995).

== Origin and recording ==
Singer Mark Lanegan of Screaming Trees contributed vocals and additional lyrics to "Long Gone Day". Saxophonist Skerik contributed saxophone to the song as well.

== Composition ==
"Long Gone Day" is possibly the band's most experimental song, as it takes influence from genres as diverse as jazz, progressive rock, classic rock, and blues.

== Release and reception ==
"Long Gone Day" was released as a promotional CD single in the US. Barbara Davies of Rolling Stone called it a "lustrous duet in which Staley trades verses with Screaming Trees vocalist Mark Lanegan, whose honeyed growl is in its element among the cool percussion, sensitive sax and pliant bass." She added, "That Mad Season are capable of tremendous power and also succeed with such a subtle song proves that the band is – at times – more than the mere sum of its parts."

== Live performances ==
"Long Gone Day" was first performed live at the band's April 22, 1995 concert in Seattle, Washington at the Crocodile Cafe. A performance of "Long Gone Day" can be found on the Live at the Moore home video release.

== Personnel ==
- Layne Staley – vocals
- Mark Lanegan – vocals
- Mike McCready – guitar
- John Baker Saunders – bass
- Barrett Martin – drums, cello, marimba
- Skerik – saxophone
