= Live at The Moore =

Video by Mad Season
- Released: August 29, 1995
- Recorded: April 29, 1995, Moore Theatre, Seattle, Washington
- Genre: Grunge, alternative rock, blues rock
- Length: 55 minutes
- Language: English
- Label: Columbia
- Director: Duncan Sharp
- Producer: Colin Stacey

Mad Season chronology
Above (1995)	Live at The Moore (1995)

Professional ratings
Review scores
Source	Rating
Allmusic	2.5/5 stars

Live at The Moore is a live album and concert film featuring the final live performance by the American rock supergroup Mad Season. It was originally released on VHS August 29, 1995.

== Overview ==
It was recorded live at the Moore Theatre in Seattle, Washington on April 29, 1995. The version of "November Hotel" played live was renamed "Black Mirror". Allmusic gave it two and a half out of a possible five stars. Live at the Moore was originally released on VHS only, but the full CD audio set of the band's performance and the first official DVD release of "Live at the Moore" was packaged with the 2013 expanded deluxe edition of their album Above. A separate vinyl version was released as well.

Also included is footage of the band's performance of "Lifeless Dead" from Pearl Jam's January 8, 1995 Self-Pollution satellite radio broadcast, a four-and-a-half-hour-long pirate broadcast out of Seattle which was available to any radio stations that wanted to carry it. "Lifeless Dead" is one of two songs that Mad Season played on the radio broadcast, along with "I Don't Know Anything", however "I Don't Know Anything" has only circulated as an audio recording. Additionally, the video for "River of Deceit" is featured as well. On April 30, 2019, Vevo released a music video on YouTube for "I Don't Know Anything".

== Track listing ==
=== Original 1995 release ===
No.	Title	Length
1.	"Lifeless Dead"
2.	"River of Deceit"
3.	"I Don't Know Anything"
4.	"Long Gone Day"
5.	"X-Ray Mind"
6.	"All Alone"
7.	"November Hotel"
8.	"Lifeless Dead" (from Self-Pollution Radio)
9.	"River of Deceit" (music video)

=== 2013 Deluxe Issue ===
CD 2: Live at the Moore audio (stereo mix)

No.	Title	Length
1.	"Wake Up"	7:38
2.	"Lifeless Dead"	4:59
3.	"Artificial Red"	6:21
4.	"River of Deceit"	5:10
5.	"I Don't Wanna Be a Soldier" (John Lennon cover)	9:20
6.	"Long Gone Day"	5:21
7.	"I'm Above"	5:36
8.	"I Don't Know Anything"	6:23
9.	"X-Ray Mind"	5:31
10.	"All Alone"	4:17
11.	"November Hotel"	13:49

DVD Video

No.	Title	Length
1.	"Lifeless Dead"
2.	"River of Deceit"
3.	"I Don't Know Anything"
4.	"Long Gone Day"
5.	"X-Ray Mind"
6.	"All Alone"
7.	"November Hotel"

Bonus Live at The Moore footage

No.	Title	Length
8.	"Wake Up"
9.	"Artificial Red"
10.	"I Don't Wanna Be a Soldier"
11.	"I'm Above"

Live at RKCNDY

No.	Title	Length
1.	"Wake Up"
2.	"Lifeless Dead"
3.	"River of Deceit"
4.	"I Don't Know Anything"
5.	"I'm Above"
6.	"Artificial Red"
7.	"I Don't Wanna Be a Soldier"
8.	"All Alone"
9.	"November Hotel"

Self-Pollution Radio

No.	Title	Length
1.	"Lifeless Dead"
2.	"I Don't Know Anything"

Music Video

No.	Title	Length
1.	"River of Deceit"

== Reissue ==
Live at the Moore was included with the 2013 deluxe reissue of Above. It includes the audio from the performance, the original VHS content plus bonus footage, including the rest of the live set, Live at RKCNDY, Self-Pollution Radio, and the music video for River of Deceit.

== Personnel ==
Mad Season

- Barrett Martin – drums, percussion
- Mike McCready – lead and rhythm guitars
- John Baker Saunders – bass guitar, upright bass
- Layne Staley – vocals, rhythm guitar

Additional musicians and production

- Brett Eliason – recording, mixing
- Mark Lanegan – vocals on "Long Gone Day"
- Lisa Levine – executive production
- Duncan Sharp – direction
- Skerik (Nalgas Sin Carne) – saxophone on "I Don't Wanna Be a Soldier" and "Long Gone Day", marimba on “Long Gone Day”
- Colin Stacey – production

== Sales chart positions ==
Chart (1995)	Position
US Top Music Videos	24
