= Patrick Hayes =

Patrick Hayes may refer to:

- Patrick Michael Hayes (1943–2011), Canadian politician, Ontario New Democratic Party
- Patrick Joseph Hayes (1867–1938), Archbishop of New York (1919) & Cardinal (1924)
- Pat Hayes (Patrick John Hayes, born 1944), British computer scientist
- Patrick Hayes (mariner) (1770–1856), nephew of Commodore John Barry
- Patrick Barry Hayes (1809–1863), American merchant

== See also ==
- Pat Hayes (disambiguation)
