= I Don't Know Anything =

Single by Mad Season

from the album Above
- Released: 1995
- Recorded: 1994
- Studio: Bad Animals, Seattle, Washington
- Genre: Grunge; alternative metal
- Length: 5:03
- Label: Columbia
- Songwriters: Barrett Martin, Mike McCready, John Baker Saunders, Layne Staley
- Producers: Brett Eliason, Mad Season

Mad Season singles chronology
"River of Deceit" (1995)	"I Don't Know Anything" (1995)	"Long Gone Day" (1995)

"I Don't Know Anything" is a song by the American rock band Mad Season, released in 1995 as the second single from the band's sole studio album, Above (1995). The song reached number 20 on the Billboard Mainstream Rock Tracks chart.

== Composition ==
The verse bar for "I Don't Know Anything" features a droning, overdriven guitar melody centered on the use of harmonics.

== Release and reception ==
"I Don't Know Anything" peaked at number 20 on the Billboard Mainstream Rock Tracks chart. Although the single was released to radio across North America and the world, it was only commercially available in Austria.

== Live performances ==
"I Don't Know Anything" was first performed live at the band's October 12, 1994 concert in Seattle, Washington at the Crocodile Cafe. A live performance of "I Don't Know Anything" appears on the "I Don't Know Anything" single. A performance of the song is also included on the Live at the Moore home video release.

== Track listing ==
All songs written by Barrett Martin, Mike McCready, John Baker Saunders, and Layne Staley.

CD (Austria)

1. "River of Deceit" (live) – 4:54
2. "I Don't Know Anything" (live) – 5:58
3. "X-Ray Mind" (live) – 5:41
4. "All Alone"/"November Hotel" (live) – 18:44
- Live tracks recorded on April 29, 1995 at the Moore Theatre in Seattle, Washington.

Promotional CD (US)

1. "I Don't Know Anything" – 5:01

== Chart positions ==
Chart (1995)	Peak position
US Mainstream Rock (Billboard)	20
