= River of Deceit =

Single by Mad Season

from the album Above
- B-side: "November Hotel" (live)
- Released: March 27, 1995
- Recorded: 1994
- Studio: Bad Animals, Seattle, Washington
- Genre: Alternative rock; blues rock; grunge
- Length: 5:04
- Label: Columbia
- Songwriters: Barrett Martin, Mike McCready, John Baker Saunders, Layne Staley
- Producers: Brett Eliason, Mad Season

Mad Season singles chronology
"River of Deceit" (1995)	"I Don't Know Anything" (1995)

Audio sample
- file; help

"River of Deceit" is a song by the American rock band Mad Season, released in 1995 as the first single from the band's only studio album, Above (1995). The song reached number two on the Billboard Mainstream Rock Tracks chart and is the band's best-known song.

== Origin and recording ==
The music for "River of Deceit" came out of rehearsals that the group had before vocalist Layne Staley joined the band.

== Lyrics ==
Many of the lyrics to "River of Deceit" were inspired by the 1923 book The Prophet by Khalil Gibran, which Staley read during the making of the album. Drummer Barrett Martin said, "Layne Staley felt as though he was on a spiritual mission through his music. Not a rock mission, a spiritual mission." Staley also wrote the song partially about his drug addiction, which would eventually lead to his death in 2002.

== Release and reception ==
The single for "River of Deceit" was released to radio across North America, Europe, and the world. "River of Deceit" became the most successful song from Above on the American rock charts. The song peaked at number two on the Billboard Mainstream Rock Tracks chart and number nine on the Billboard Modern Rock Tracks chart. It would go on to become the band's most well-known song as it received substantial radio play throughout the 1990s.

Outside the United States, the single was released commercially in Australia and Austria. In Canada, the song reached the top 70 on the Canadian Singles Chart, and later it charted on the Canadian Alternative Top 30 chart where it reached number eight.

== Music video ==
The music video for "River of Deceit" was directed by Josh Taft. The black-and-white video features the band performing the song amid scenes of people engaged in various activities. It is the only music video the band released. The video can be found at the end of the concert video, Live at the Moore.

== Live performances ==
"River of Deceit" was first performed live at the band's October 12, 1994 concert in Seattle, Washington at the Crocodile Cafe. Live performances of "River of Deceit" can be found on the "I Don't Know Anything" single and the compilation album Bite Back: Live at Crocodile Cafe. A performance of the song is also included on the Live at the Moore home video release.

On May 23, 2012, the surviving members of Mad Season (Mike McCready and Barrett Martin) performed "River of Deceit" during a set at the Showbox Theatre in Seattle for Mike's annual benefit concert for Crohn's Disease. They were joined by Loaded singer Jeff Rouse and bassist Rick Friel.

On January 30, 2015, the surviving members of Mad Season again reunited for a concert at Benaroya Hall in Seattle, with Chris Cornell filling in on lead vocals. The band played several Mad Season songs, including "River of Deceit". A recording of the concert was released as a live album Mad Season & The Seattle Symphony - Sonic Evolution / January 30, 2015 / Benaroya Hall. Chris Cornell subsequently added "River of Deceit" to his solo repertoire, performing the song each night on his 2015 Higher Truth tour. Cornell also mentions the lyric "River of Deceit" in his song "Ground Zero" with the lyrics being "Blood on the concrete/River of Deceit/Will you be around?". Temple of the Dog also played the song on their 2016 tour.

== Track listing ==
All songs written by Barrett Martin, Mike McCready, John Baker Saunders, and Layne Staley.

CD (Australia and Austria) and Cassette (Australia)

1. "River of Deceit" – 5:04
2. "November Hotel" (live) – 15:17
  - Recorded live on November 20, 1994 at the Crocodile Cafe in Seattle, Washington, United States. Some copies list the second track as just "November Hotel" (without "All Alone").

Promotional CD (US)

1. "River of Deceit" – 5:04

== Chart positions ==
Chart (1995)	Peak position
Canada Top Singles (RPM)	68
Canada Rock/Alternative (RPM)	8
US Mainstream Rock (Billboard)	2
US Modern Rock Tracks (Billboard)	9
