= Pat Hayes (disambiguation) =

Pat Hayes (born 1944) is a computer scientist.

Pat Hay(e)s may also refer to:

- Pat Hays (1947–2023), American lawyer and politician
- Pat Hayes (Canadian politician) (1942–2011)
- Pat Hayes of American blues band, The Lamont Cranston Band (active since 1969)
- Pat Hayes of Australian alternative-rock band, Falling Joys (active since 1985)
- Pat Hayes (rower) (born 1951), American Olympic rower

== See also ==
- Patrick Hayes (disambiguation)
- Patricia Hayes (disambiguation)
