= Above (Mad Season album) =

Studio album by Mad Season
- Released: March 14, 1995
- Recorded: Winter 1994
- Studios: Bad Animals, Seattle, Washington
- Genres: Grunge; alternative rock; hard rock
- Length: 55:36
- Language: English
- Label: Columbia
- Producers: Brett Eliason, Mad Season

Mad Season chronology
Above (1995)	Live at The Moore (1995)

Singles from Above
- 1. "River of Deceit" Released: March 27, 1995; 2. "I Don't Know Anything" Released: 1995; 3. "Long Gone Day" Released: 1995

Above is the only studio album by the American rock band Mad Season, released on March 14, 1995 through Columbia Records. Above peaked at No. 24 on the Billboard 200 chart. The album has been certified gold by the RIAA in the United States. The band's singer Layne Staley created the artwork on the album cover and inside the inlay.

== Background ==
During the production of Pearl Jam's Vitalogy, guitarist Mike McCready went into rehabilitation in Minneapolis, Minnesota, where he met John Baker Saunders, who would a short while later become bassist in The Walkabouts. In 1994, when the two returned to Seattle, they formed a side band with Screaming Trees drummer Barrett Martin. Immediately the trio set up rehearsal time together and began writing material. McCready then brought in friend and Alice in Chains frontman Layne Staley to round out the line-up. McCready had hoped that being around sober musicians would push Staley to get himself sober.

== Recording ==
The album was recorded in 1994 at Bad Animals Studio in Seattle, Washington. Producer and mixer Brett Eliason previously worked with McCready as Pearl Jam's sound engineer.

"It's hard to describe the album. Martin plays some vibes and Layne plays guitar. There's some jazzy stuff, some blues, some arena rock. I bought a Gibson Jimmy Page double-neck for the sessions. I look like an idiot with it, but it sounds so cool. I can totally get Jimmy's 'Stairway to Heaven' sound." – Mike McCready

The music for "Wake Up" and "River of Deceit" came from group rehearsals before Staley joined. "Artificial Red" came together at the band's show at the Crocodile Cafe in October 1994. "Lifeless Dead" and "I Don't Know Anything" were premiered on Pearl Jam's January 8, 1995 Self-Pollution satellite radio show – a four-and-a-half-hour-long pirate broadcast from Seattle that was available to any radio stations that wanted to carry it.

"We did all the Mad Season music in about seven days," McCready said. "It took Layne just a few more days to finish his vocals, which was intense since we only rehearsed twice and did four shows. So this has been the most spontaneous thing I've ever been involved in. This was done even quicker than Temple of the Dog, which took about four weeks… With Mad Season we just went in and started jamming on tunes and everybody had ideas and it just happened with three or four days."

McCready said, "I told [Staley]… 'You do what you want, you write all the songs and lyrics. You're the singer.' He'd come in, and he'd do these beautiful songs."

During the making of the album, Staley read The Prophet by Kahlil Gibran. "Layne Staley felt as though he was on a spiritual mission through his music," said Martin. "Not a rock mission, a spiritual mission."

== Music and lyrics ==
"River of Deceit"
A sample of "River of Deceit", the first single released from the album. The lyrics for the song, written by Staley, were inspired by The Prophet by Khalil Gibran.

Stephen Thomas Erlewine of AllMusic said that the album "sounds like a cross between Alice in Chains and Pearl Jam, taking the ponderous seriousness of Alice and PJ's '90s update of winding '70s guitar rock." "I Don't Know Anything"'s verse bar features a droning, overdriven guitar melody centered on the use of harmonics. "Long Gone Day" takes influence from genres as diverse as jazz, psychedelic rock, classic rock, and blues. Saxophonist Skerik contributes to the song.

Staley is credited for writing all the lyrics on the original release within the liner notes of the 2013 deluxe issue. As was the case with much of his work with Alice in Chains, Staley's lyrics dealt with his struggle against addiction as well as other personal troubles. Lyrically, much of "River of Deceit" was inspired by Khalil Gibran's The Prophet. Vocalist Mark Lanegan of Screaming Trees contributes guest vocals on "I'm Above" and "Long Gone Day"; he is also credited for co-writing the music to those tracks along with McCready and Martin. Lanegan also wrote the lyrics for the three bonus tracks on disc 1 of the deluxe issue - "Locomotive", "Black Book of Fear", and "Slip Away". R.E.M. guitarist Peter Buck is credited for co-writing the music to "Black Book of Fear" along with McCready, Martin, Saunders, and Lanegan.

== Release and reception ==
Professional ratings
Review scores
Source	Rating
AllMusic	3/5 stars
Consequence	B+
Entertainment Weekly	C
Pitchfork	4.6/10
Rolling Stone	3/5 stars

Above received mostly positive reviews from music critics and was very well received by grunge fans, but some critics pointed out the album's flaws. Despite some negative criticism, the album was a moderate commercial success. Over the course of 1995, Above scaled the Billboard 200 album chart eventually peaking at number 24. Above has been certified gold by the RIAA.

Melody Maker called the album "a Country Sabbath combination" and "a refreshing holiday from the pressures of corporate ultra-stardom." AllMusic staff writer Stephen Thomas Erlewine gave the album three out of five stars, saying that "the album meanders without much direction, yet there are flashes of invention, particularly in Staley's work, with McCready contributing a few tasty licks." Rolling Stone staff writer Barbara Davies gave Above two and a half out of five stars but was later changed to a more positive three out of five stars, saying that Mad Season "take artistic risks and set out to make something fresh on Above." However, she criticized the album for having a "hit-or-miss quality." Davies ended the review by stating that "the band is—at times—more than the mere sum of its parts." Chuck Eddy of Entertainment Weekly gave the album a C. He said, "A sax solo and zooming guitars provide momentary relief, but most Mad Season sludge is unbearably immobile." He ended by saying, "It's big trouble when one of the most upbeat songs is called 'Lifeless Dead'."

Above included the singles "River of Deceit", "I Don't Know Anything", and "Long Gone Day". The lead single "River of Deceit" had an accompanying music video, while other music videos were taken from performances from the band's home video release, Live at The Moore. "River of Deceit" was the most successful song from Above on the rock charts, reaching number two on the Mainstream Rock charts and number nine on the Modern Rock charts. "I Don't Know Anything" also charted on the Mainstream Rock charts. "River of Deceit" is arguably the group's best known song while "I Don't Know Anything" still maintains modest radio play today.

=== Rerelease ===
In October 2012, drummer Barrett Martin announced a Mad Season box set would be released on March 12, 2013, nearly 18 years to the day after the release of Above. The release date was later pushed back to April 2, 2013. Martin said that

To honor our departed brothers, Mike [McCready] and I oversaw a Mad Season box set, which comes out March 12th, 2013. It contains the re-mastered Above album, the Live at The Moore concert on DVD with surround sound, and a bunch of live recordings that we never released. The most exciting stuff: three songs that Mark Lanegan wrote lyrics and sang on, songs that we started to record for the second album but never finished because of Baker's and Layne's deaths. One of the songs Peter Buck wrote with us, and the other two are from me and Mike. They are three of the heaviest and most beautiful songs Mad Season did, and I know Layne and Baker will love them.

On January 7, 2013, Blabbermouth.net reported that Legacy Recordings would release an expanded deluxe edition of Above, a three-disc boxset comprising two CDs and one DVD. It includes the original studio album and a host of extras, specifically some unreleased tracks from the band's unfinished second album with lyrics and vocals by Mark Lanegan; the full audio set of the band's "Live at The Moore" performance on April 29, 1995; and the first official DVD release of "Live at The Moore", including a previously unreleased full concert video of the band's New Year's Eve performance from the now-defunct Seattle club RKCNDY.

In April 2019, Above was ranked No. 18 on Rolling Stone's "50 Greatest Grunge Albums" list.

== Packaging ==
The album's gloomy, black and white cover art featuring a couple tongue-kissing was illustrated by Staley. The drawing was based upon a photograph of Staley and his ex-fiancée, Demri Lara Parrott. The album's title comes from the song "I'm Above".

== Track listing ==
All lyrics by Layne Staley, except where noted. All music by Mad Season, except where noted.

No.	Title	Music	Length
1.	"Wake Up"		7:38
2.	"X-Ray Mind"		5:12
3.	"River of Deceit"		5:04
4.	"I'm Above"	Barrett Martin, Mike McCready, Mark Lanegan, Staley	5:44
5.	"Artificial Red"		6:16
6.	"Lifeless Dead"		4:29
7.	"I Don't Know Anything"		5:01
8.	"Long Gone Day"	Martin, McCready, Lanegan, Staley	4:52
9.	"November Hotel" (instrumental)		7:08
10.	"All Alone"		4:12
Total length:			55:36

2013 Deluxe Edition bonus tracks
No.	Title	Lyrics	Music	Length
11.	"Interlude"			0:43
12.	"Locomotive"	Lanegan		4:34
13.	"Black Book of Fear"	Lanegan	Martin, McCready, John Baker Saunders, Lanegan, Peter Buck	6:08
14.	"Slip Away"	Lanegan		5:39
15.	"I Don't Wanna Be a Soldier Mama"	John Lennon	Lennon	5:52

2013 Deluxe Edition Disc 2: Live at The Moore
No.	Title	Writer(s)	Length
1.	"Wake Up"		7:38
2.	"Lifeless Dead"		4:59
3.	"Artificial Red"		6:21
4.	"River of Deceit"		5:10
5.	"I Don't Wanna Be a Soldier"	Lennon	9:20
6.	"Long Gone Day"	Lanegan, Martin, McCready, Staley	5:21
7.	"I'm Above"	Lanegan, Martin, McCready, Staley	5:36
8.	"I Don't Know Anything"		6:23
9.	"X-Ray Mind"		5:32
10.	"All Alone"		4:17
11.	"November Hotel"		13:49

=== DVD: Live at The Moore plus bonus footage ===
Full video set of the Live at The Moore performance from Seattle, Washington, on April 29, 1995. It also contains bonus footage, including a full concert of the band's performance at RKCNDY in Seattle on December 31, 1994, and both performances from Pearl Jam's Self Pollution Radio broadcast on January 8, 1995.

== Outtakes ==
A promotional version of Above has a bonus track entitled "Interlude", an instrumental piece by McCready which was also sometimes played live by Pearl Jam, labelled as "Going Home (improv)", which follows "Artificial Red". Mad Season's cover of the John Lennon song "I Don't Wanna Be a Soldier" was also recorded around this time. "I Don't Wanna Be a Soldier" appeared on the 1995 John Lennon tribute album, Working Class Hero.

== Personnel ==
Mad Season

- Barrett Martin – drums, percussion, double bass, cello, marimba, vibraphone
- Mike McCready – lead, rhythm and acoustic guitars
- John Baker Saunders – bass guitar
- Layne Staley – vocals, rhythm guitar, illustrations

Additional musicians

- Mark Lanegan – vocals on "I'm Above", "Long Gone Day", "Locomotive", "Black Book of Fear" and "Slip Away"
- Skerik (Nalgas Sin Carne) – saxophone on "Long Gone Day" and "I Don't Wanna Be a Soldier"

Production

- Brett Eliason – production, engineering, mixing
- Sony Felberg – engineering
- Sam Hofstedt – assistant engineering
- Mad Season – production, art direction
- Lance Mercer – photography
- Gabrielle Raumberger – design
- Howie Weinberg – mastering

== Charts ==
=== Weekly charts ===
Chart (1995)	Peak position
Australian Albums (ARIA)	51
Canada Top Albums/CDs (RPM)	65
Norwegian Albums (VG-lista)	24
Swedish Albums (Sverigetopplistan)	46
UK Albums (Official Charts)	41
US Billboard 200	24

=== Year-end charts ===
Chart (1995)	Position
US Billboard 200	156

== Certifications ==
Region	Certification	Certified units/sales
United States (RIAA)	Gold	500,000^{^}
^{^} Shipments figures based on certification alone.
