= Mad Season (band) =

American rock supergroup

- Mad Season in 1995, left to right: Barrett Martin, Layne Staley, John Baker Saunders, and Mike McCready

Background information
- Also known as: Gacy Bunch; Disinformation
- Origin: Seattle, Washington, U.S.
- Genres: Alternative rock, grunge
- Years active: 1994–1996 (1997–1999 as Disinformation, partial Mad Season reunions in 2012, 2014–2015)
- Label: Columbia
- Spinoff of: Alice in Chains, Pearl Jam, Screaming Trees
- Past members: Barrett Martin; Mike McCready; John Baker Saunders; Layne Staley; Mark Lanegan

Mad Season was an American rock supergroup formed in 1994 as a side project of members of other bands in the Seattle grunge scene. The band's principal members included guitarist Mike McCready of Pearl Jam, lead singer Layne Staley of Alice in Chains, drummer Barrett Martin of Screaming Trees, and bassist John Baker Saunders. Mad Season released only one album, Above, in March 1995. Its first single, "River of Deceit", was a radio success, and Above was certified a gold record by the RIAA in June.

The band went on a semi-permanent hiatus in 1996 due to the band members' conflicting schedules and Staley's problems with substance abuse. Attempts were made in the late 1990s to revive the group with Screaming Trees frontman Mark Lanegan instead of Staley, and material for a follow-up release to Above had been worked on. The band permanently dissolved in 1999 following the death of bassist John Baker Saunders from a drug overdose. Staley would also die from an overdose three years later. Martin and McCready have since made two short partial reunions, one in 2012 and one from 2014 to 2015. A special edition box set containing a remastered edition of Above and various unreleased material was released in March 2013.

== History ==
=== Career beginnings (1994–1995) ===
During the production of 1994's Vitalogy, Pearl Jam guitarist Mike McCready went into drug and alcohol rehab at the Hazelden Clinic in Minnesota, where he met bassist John Baker Saunders. In 1994, when the two returned to Seattle, Washington, they formed a side band with drummer Barrett Martin. McCready played in bands such as Pearl Jam and Temple of the Dog, Martin with Skin Yard and the Screaming Trees and Saunders with blues talents such as Little Pat Rushing, Hubert Sumlin, Sammy Fender, and The Lamont Cranston Band. Immediately the trio set up rehearsal time together and wrote the music for two songs that would later become Mad Season's "Wake Up" and "River of Deceit", both of which would later appear on the band's album Above. McCready then brought in friend and Alice in Chains frontman Layne Staley to round out the line-up. McCready had hoped that being around sober musicians would push Staley to get himself sober.

Despite not having a single song completely prepared (only beginnings of songs, according to Martin) and not even having a name for the band, McCready scheduled an unannounced show at the Crocodile Cafe on October 12, 1994, which was a big success. The song "Artificial Red", which was also to appear on the album, actually came together during the show itself. Two more gigs were scheduled (November 6 & 20, 1994) at the same venue, with the band calling itself The Gacy Bunch, after both the notorious serial killer John Wayne Gacy of Chicago and the 1970s sitcom The Brady Bunch. On January 8, 1995, the band made an appearance on Pearl Jam's Self-Pollution satellite radio broadcast, a four-and-a-half-hour-long pirate broadcast out of Seattle which was available to any radio stations that wanted to carry it, performing "Lifeless Dead" and "I Don't Know Anything".

=== Above (1995) ===
After gaining more popularity, the band recorded its only album and changed its name to Mad Season, which is an English term for the time of the year when psilocybin mushrooms are in full bloom, and a term which McCready related to "the seasons of drinking and drug abuse." The album, Above, which was recorded in Seattle, Washington at Bad Animals Studio (co-owned by Ann and Nancy Wilson of Heart) and co-produced by the band and Pearl Jam sound engineer Brett Eliason, featured ten songs. It also included guest vocals and additional lyrics by Screaming Trees frontman and solo artist Mark Lanegan. McCready said, "We did all the Mad Season music in about seven days. It took Layne just a few more days to finish his vocals, which was intense since we only rehearsed twice and did four shows." The album was released on March 14, 1995, through Columbia Records to critical and commercial success. Over the course of 1995, Above scaled the Billboard 200, eventually peaking at No. 24 and spawning two singles: "River of Deceit" (#2 Mainstream Rock Tracks, No. 9 Modern Rock Tracks) and "I Don't Know Anything" (#20 Mainstream Rock Tracks). Above was certified gold on June 14, 1995.

=== Dormancy, Disinformation, and Dissolution (1996–1999) ===
The band continued to play shows during the spring of 1995 before going on hiatus so that the members could return to work with their main bands. During this time the band released the Live at the Moore concert film, which was a live performance recorded at Seattle's Moore Theatre on April 29, 1995. Also, during this time the band contributed a cover of John Lennon's "I Don't Wanna Be a Soldier" to the 1995 John Lennon tribute album, Working Class Hero. In 1996, a live version of "River of Deceit" surfaced on the Bite Back: Live at Crocodile Cafe compilation album, although by this time Mad Season had long been dormant from live work as McCready and Martin went back to work with their respective bands and Saunders joined The Walkabouts.

In 1997, attempts were made by McCready, Saunders and Martin to revive Mad Season, although by this point Staley's health had worsened due to severe drug addiction; he would never perform again after a July 1996 Alice in Chains show. As a result, Mad Season was without a singer. With Staley now out of the picture, the band recruited vocalist Mark Lanegan (of the Screaming Trees), who had previously guested on the Above album (as well as at live shows) as its new permanent singer. With the switch in frontmen the group also switched names adopting the Disinformation moniker in late 1997.

Work reportedly began in 1998 on what would have been Disinformation's debut album, although between everyone's busy schedules, it became difficult to meet in the studio together. Over the course of the year the quartet gradually grew apart, making a Disinformation album all the more unlikely. Another critical blow was dealt to the project in January 1999 with the death of bassist John Baker Saunders from an overdose of heroin. Although no official announcement by the band was ever given, Staley confirmed in July 1999 (during an Alice in Chains interview) that the group had disbanded.

=== Post-breakup ===
Following Saunders' death, McCready returned to working and touring with Pearl Jam and also later formed a new side project, The Rockfords. Martin briefly returned to work with Screaming Trees before the band disbanded in 2000. Since then Martin has worked as an occasional touring drummer for R.E.M. and performs with R.E.M guitarist Peter Buck in the band Tuatara. Staley briefly reunited with Alice in Chains in the late 1990s before dropping out of the public eye permanently. His body was later found on April 19, 2002, in his condominium, the victim of an apparent overdose of cocaine and heroin about two weeks prior. Lanegan went on to a relatively successful solo career, worked with Queens of the Stone Age, and performed with Isobel Campbell on the 2006 Mercury Prize nominated album, Ballad of the Broken Seas, and as part of a duo with Greg Dulli under the name The Gutter Twins.

On February 28, 2010, McCready performed at the Hootenanny For Haiti at the Showbox at the Market in Seattle along with the likes of Velvet Revolver, Loaded and former Guns N' Roses bassist Duff McKagan, Fastbacks bassist Kim Warnick, and former Alien Crime Syndicate, Sirens Sister and Vendetta Red bassist Jeff Rouse as well as Truly and former Screaming Trees drummer Mark Pickerel among others. A number of songs were covered during the show, including Belinda Carlisle's "Heaven Is a Place on Earth", Hank Williams' "I'm So Lonesome I Could Cry", and the Rolling Stones' "Dead Flowers" among others however one of the more notable moments came when McCready performed "River of Deceit" for the first time since the breakup of Mad Season with Jeff Rouse performing vocal duties on the song.

=== Partial reunion ===
On May 23, 2012, the surviving members of Mad Season (Mike McCready and Barrett Martin) reunited at the Showbox Theatre in Seattle for Mike's annual benefit concert for Crohn's disease. They were joined by Loaded singer Jeff Rouse and The Rockfords bassist Rick Friel.

In 2012, Martin, McCready and McKagan, along with singer Jeff Angell and keyboardist Benjamin Anderson collaborated on an album called Walking Papers. Spurred by this collaboration, Martin, McCready and McKagan revisited the unreleased Mad Season material. In July 2012, Martin confirmed that Mark Lanegan would be singing several songs on a new Mad Season release.

In October 2012, Barrett Martin announced a Mad Season box set:

To honor our departed brothers, Mike [McCready] and I oversaw a Mad Season box set, which comes out March 12th, 2013. It contains the re-mastered Above album, the Moore concert on DVD with surround sound, and a bunch of live recordings that we never released. The most exciting stuff: three songs that Mark Lanegan wrote lyrics and sang on, songs we started to record for the second album but never finished because of Baker's and Layne's deaths. One of the songs Peter Buck wrote with us, and the other two are from me and Mike. They are three of the heaviest and most beautiful songs Mad Season did, and I know Layne and Baker will love them.

Legacy Recordings released an expanded deluxe edition of Above in April 2013. A three-disc boxset comprising two CDs and one DVD, it includes a digitally remastered version of the studio album, the John Lennon cover "I Don't Wanna Be a Soldier", some unreleased tracks from the band's unfinished second album with lyrics and vocals by Mark Lanegan, the band's "Live at the Moore" performance on April 29, 1995, on CD, DVD, and vinyl, and a previously unreleased full concert video of the band's New Year's Eve performance from the now-defunct Seattle club RKCNDY as well as video of the band's performance from the Self-Pollution radio broadcast.

Mad Season reunited again for a special concert titled "Sonic Evolution" with the Seattle Symphony Orchestra on January 30, 2015, at Benaroya Hall in Seattle. At this show, Chris Cornell filled in for Staley on vocals, and McKagan filled in for Saunders on bass. Kim Virant of Lazy Susan and Jeff Angell of Walking Papers also provided vocals at the gig. The concert was recorded for the live album Mad Season & The Seattle Symphony - Sonic Evolution / January 30, 2015 / Benaroya Hall and was released August 28, 2015. The album debuted at number four on the Billboard Top Classical Crossover Albums chart.

=== New material ===
In July 2015, Martin announced on Facebook that he was recording new Mad Season material with McCready and McKagan. The fruits of the collaboration resulted in a project called The Levee Walkers, which released the songs "Freedom Song" and "Tears for the West" in 2016 with singer Jaz Coleman and the song "All Things Fade Away" in 2017 with singer Ayron Jones.

== Musical style ==
"River of Deceit"
A sample of "River of Deceit", the first single released from the album. The lyrics for the song, written by Staley, were inspired by The Prophet by Khalil Gibran.

McCready described the songs on the band's only album, Above, as "some jazzy stuff, some blues, some arena rock." Before his review was revised, Stephen Thomas Erlewine of Allmusic said that the album "sounds like a cross between Alice in Chains and Pearl Jam, taking the ponderous seriousness of Alice and PJ's '90s update of winding '70s guitar rock." Staley's lyrics dealt with his personal troubles, with Martin saying, "Layne Staley felt as though he was on a spiritual mission through his music." During the lyric writing process, Staley was reading the book The Prophet by Kahlil Gibran, which was a strong influence on the lyrics and the overall tone of the album. "I Don't Know Anything" is a heavier, blues-influenced track, while "Long Gone Day" takes considerable jazz influence, combining the use of samba-style bass, xylophone, and saxophone.

Staley is credited for writing all the lyrics on the original release within the liner notes of the 2013 deluxe issue. As was the case with much of his work with Alice in Chains, Staley's lyrics dealt with his struggle against addiction as well as other personal troubles. Lyrically, much of "River of Deceit" was inspired by Khalil Gibran's The Prophet. Vocalist Mark Lanegan of Screaming Trees contributes guest vocals on "I'm Above" and "Long Gone Day"; he is also credited for co-writing the music to those tracks along with McCready and Martin. Lanegan also wrote the lyrics for the three bonus tracks on Disc 1 of the deluxe issue - "Locomotive", "Black Book of Fear", and "Slip Away". R.E.M. guitarist Peter Buck is credited for co-writing the music to "Black Book of Fear" along with McCready, Martin, Saunders, and Lanegan.

== Band members ==
=== Official members ===
- Barrett Martin (Screaming Trees) – drums, percussion, cello and upright bass (1994–1999, 2012, 2014–2015)
- Mike McCready (Pearl Jam) – lead guitar (1994–1999, 2012, 2014–2015)
- John Baker Saunders (later with The Walkabouts) – bass (1994–1999; died 1999)
- Layne Staley (Alice in Chains) – vocals, rhythm guitar (1994–1997; died 2002)
- Mark Lanegan (Screaming Trees, later with Queens of the Stone Age) – vocals (1997–1999; died 2022)

=== Additional personnel ===
- Skerik – saxophone, percussion (1994–1995)
- Chris Cornell (Soundgarden) – vocals (2015; died 2017)
- Duff McKagan (Guns N' Roses) – bass (2015)
- Matt Cameron (Soundgarden, Pearl Jam) – drums (2015)

== Discography ==
=== Studio albums ===
Title	Album details	Peak chart positions						Certifications (sales thresholds)
Title	Album details	US	AUS	CAN	NOR	SWE	UK	Certifications (sales thresholds)
Above	Released: March 14, 1995; Label: Columbia; Format: CD, cassette (CS), LP	24	51	65	24	46	41	RIAA: Gold

=== Singles ===
Title	Year	Peak chart positions				Album
Title	Year	US Alt.	US Main.	CAN	CAN Alt.	Album
"River of Deceit"	1995	9	2	68	8	Above
"I Don't Know Anything"	1995	—	20	—	—	Above
"Long Gone Day"	1995	—	—	—	—	Above
"—" denotes singles that did not chart.

=== Official music videos ===
- 1995 - "River of Deceit"

=== Videos ===
Year	Video details	US peak chart position
1995	Live at the Moore: Released: August 29, 1995; Label: Columbia; Format: VHS	24

=== Other appearances ===
Year	Song	Title	Label
1995	"I Don't Wanna Be a Soldier"	Working Class Hero: A Tribute to John Lennon	Hollywood
1996	"River of Deceit" (live)	Bite Back: Live at Crocodile Cafe	PopLlama
2017	"Ascension"	The Singing Earth	Sunyata Records

== See also ==
- List of alternative rock artists
