= Working Class Hero: A Tribute to John Lennon =

Compilation album by various artists
- Released: 10 October 1995
- Genre: Alternative rock
- Label: Hollywood
- Producers: Lindy Goetz (executive producer), individual performance producers

Professional ratings
Review scores
Source	Rating
AllMusic	2/5 stars
Q	1/5 stars

Working Class Hero is a 1995 tribute album to the Beatles singer/songwriter John Lennon. It gets its name from a Lennon song of the same name. Lindy Goetz, longtime manager of Red Hot Chili Peppers, acted as executive producer. The album was released through Hollywood Records in support of the Humane Society of the United States. According to the back cover of the CD, "Fifty percent of artist royalties, producer royalties, and of Hollywood Records' net profits from this album will be contributed to a dedicated fund administered by the Humane Society of the United States of America and will be used for spaying and neutering cats and dogs." A PSA for the Humane society was released featuring the Chili Peppers to draw attention to the cause and the album.

== Track listing ==
All songs written by John Lennon.

No.	Title	Artist	Length
1.	"I Found Out"	Red Hot Chili Peppers	4:03
2.	"I Don't Wanna Be a Soldier"	Mad Season	5:13
3.	"Steel and Glass"	Candlebox	4:27
4.	"Imagine"	Blues Traveler	3:45
5.	"Working Class Hero"	Screaming Trees	3:52
6.	"Power to the People"	The Minus 5	3:08
7.	"How Do You Sleep?"	The Magnificent Bastards	7:13
8.	"Nobody Told Me"	The Flaming Lips	3:45
9.	"Well, Well, Well"	Super 8	4:21
10.	"Cold Turkey"	Cheap Trick	5:50
11.	"Jealous Guy"	Collective Soul	4:11
12.	"Isolation"	Sponge	2:39
13.	"Instant Karma!"	Toad the Wet Sprocket	4:28
14.	"Grow Old with Me"	Mary Chapin Carpenter	3:18
15.	"Mind Games"	George Clinton	5:26

== Personnel ==
1. "I Found Out"
  - Anthony Kiedis – vocals
  - Flea – bass
  - Dave Navarro – guitar
  - Chad Smith – drums
  - Rick Rubin – producer
  - Dave Sardy – engineer, mixing
  - Kathy Yore – assistant engineer
2. "I Don't Wanna Be a Soldier"
  - Mike McCready – guitar
  - Layne Staley – vocals
  - Barrett Martin – drums, percussion
  - John Baker Saunders – bass
  - Nalgas Sin Carne – saxophone
  - Mad Season – producer
  - Brett Eliason – producer, engineer, mixing
  - Sony Felho – assistant engineer
  - Sam Hofstedt – assistant engineer
3. "Steel and Glass"
  - Kevin Martin – vocals
  - Peter Klett – guitar
  - Bardi Martin – bass
  - Scott Mercado – drums
  - Kelly Gray – producer, engineer, mixing
  - Jon Plum – engineer, mixing
  - Jeff Ott – assistant engineer
  - John Burton – assistant engineer
4. "Imagine"
  - John Popper – vocals, harmonica
  - Chan Kinchla – guitar
  - Bob Sheehan – bass
  - Brendan Hill – drums
  - Steve Thompson – producer, mixing
  - Michael Barbiero – producer, mixing, engineer
  - Michael Nuceder – assistant engineer
  - Greg Calbi – mastering
5. "Working Class Hero"
  - Mark Lanegan – vocals
  - Lee Conner – guitars
  - Van Conner – 12-string guitar, background vocals
  - Barrett Martin – drums, cello, upright bass
  - Kent Steedman – guitar
  - Brett Eliason – producer, engineer, mixing
  - Screaming Trees – producer
  - Sony Felho – assistant engineer
6. "Power to the People"
  - Scott McCaughey – bass, guitar, vocals, producer
  - Mary Lou Lord – vocals
  - Lee Ranaldo – guitar, vocals
  - Peter Buck – guitars
  - Dennis Diken – drums
  - Rob Grenoble – engineer
  - Wayne Dorell Tarin – assistant engineer
  - Scott Litt – mixing
  - Victor Janacua – assistant mix engineer
7. "How Do You Sleep?"
  - Scott Weiland – vocals
  - Zander Schloss – guitar
  - Jeff Nolan – guitar
  - Bob Thomson – bass
  - Victor Indrizzo – drums
  - Chris Goss – producer
  - Joe Barresi – engineer
  - Charlie Boves – assistant engineer
  - Tom Banghart – assistant engineer
  - George Drakoulias – mixing
8. "Nobody Told Me"
  - Michael Ivins – bass, vocals
  - Ronald Jones – guitar, vocals
  - Wayne Coyne – vocals, guitar
  - Steven Drozd – drums, vocals
  - The Flaming Lips – producer
  - Dave Fridmann – producer
9. "Well, Well, Well"
  - Bob Khaleel – vocals
  - John O'Brien – guitar
  - Joel Shearer – guitar
  - Heming Borthne – bass
  - John Steward – drums
  - Rick Parashar – producer, mixing
  - Dave McNair – engineer, mixing
  - CJ Devillar – assistant engineer
10. "Cold Turkey"
  - Robin Zander – vocals, guitar
  - Rick Nielsen – guitars, vocals
  - Tom Petersson – bass, vocals
  - Bun E. Carlos – drums
  - Julian Raymond – producer
  - Cheap Trick – producer
  - Doug McBride – engineer
  - Gary Platt – engineer
  - Jerry Finn – engineer
  - Ron Lowe – assistant engineer
  - Ken Latchney – assistant engineer
  - Pat Karamian – assistant engineer
11. "Jealous Guy"
  - Ed Roland – vocals, producer, mixing
  - Dean Roland – rhythm guitar
  - Ross Childress – lead guitar
  - Will Turpin– bass
  - Shane Evans – drums
  - Matt Serletic – mellotron, producer, mixing
  - Greg Archilla – engineer
  - Jeff Tomei – engineer, mix engineer
  - Malcolm Springer – second engineer
  - John Nielson – second engineer
12. "Isolation"
  - Vinnie Dombroski – vocals
  - Mike Cross – guitar
  - Joey Mazzola – guitar
  - Tim Cross – bass
  - Charlie Grover – drums
  - Sponge – producer
  - Tim Patalan – producer, engineer, mixing
  - Andy Patalan – assistant engineer
13. "Instant Karma!"
  - Glen Phillips – vocals
  - Dean Dinning – bass
  - Todd Nichols – guitar
  - Randy Guss – drums
  - Angus Cooke, Tom Flowers, Joe Mock – additional hand claps and vocals
  - Toad the Wet Sprocket – producer
  - Susan Rogers – producer, engineer, mixing
14. "Grow Old with Me"
  - Mary Chapin Carpenter – vocals, acoustic guitar, producer
  - Jonathan Carroll – piano
  - Duke Levine – electric guitar
  - J.T. Brown – electric bass
  - Robbie Magruder – cymbals
  - John Jennings – additional keyboards, percussion, producer
  - Jim Robeson – engineer, mixing
15. "Mind Games"
  - George Clinton – vocals, producer
  - DeWayne "Blackbyrd" McKnight – guitars, bass
  - Billy "Bass" Nelson – bass
  - Joseph "Amp" Fiddler – piano, keyboards
  - Gary "Mudbone" Cooper – drums, vocals
  - Garry Shider, Robert "P-Nut" Johnson, Pat Lewis, Belita Woods, Sheila Horne, Patty Walker, Joy Gilliam, Chip Glass, Andre "Foxxe" Williams – vocals
  - Detroit Symphony Orchestra – strings
  - Paul Riser – string arrangemenets
  - Chris Baker – engineer
  - Carl Robinson – engineer
  - Brian Smith – engineer
  - Cary Cornett – assistant engineer
  - Jim Vitti – mixing
