= Layne Staley: Angry Chair =

2003 biography about Layne Staley

- Author: Adriana Rubio
- Language: English
- Subject: Layne Staley
- Genre: Biography
- Publication date: January 2003

Layne Staley: Angry Chair, subtitled A Look Inside the Heart and Soul of an Incredible Musician, is a biography by Argentinean journalist Adriana Rubio about Layne Staley, the lead vocalist of the rock band Alice in Chains, published in January 2003. It is named after the Alice in Chains song, Angry Chair.

It features 50 pages of photos of Staley's art work, sketches, diary entries, and childhood pictures. It also contains the alleged last interview of Staley, which Rubio claimed she conducted less than three months before Staley died of a heroin and cocaine overdose in April 2002. Rubio also conducted extensive interviews with Staley's mother, Nancy Layne McCallum, as well as his sister Liz Coats (née Elmer) while writing the book. The book was re-released as Layne Staley: Get Born Again on 30 June 2006, with additional material including more pictures and artworks from Staley, and an extended version of the alleged last interview.

== Controversy ==
The content of Rubio's book, including what she described as Layne's final interview, was called into serious question in David De Sola's 2015 book Alice In Chains: The Untold Story.

In his book, DeSola questions not only the content of the alleged interview - which contains multiple factual errors, portrays Staley as using his lyrics and song titles in casual conversation, and also uses quotes from previous printed interviews - but also dispels the claim that Rubio ever interviewed Staley at all. While Rubio's book received massive coverage at the time of its release, De Sola's counter claims were not quoted by any of the websites that cited Rubio's content as truthful.

Staley's friends and family have also publicly expressed their frustration over, and have disputed Rubio's book, stating that it is "full of lies", and claim that Rubio never interviewed Staley, who had expressed no interest in talking to her.

One of Staley's sisters, Liz Coats, has been quoted as saying:

I personally have never read Adriana's book. I did meet with her and speak with her at length. I also talked with Layne when I was contacted by her, and let him know of her intentions to write a book about him. He let me know that he wanted no part of it. He said that he did not trust journalists, and that they had never been honest in his experience. He also said for me to tell her, and I quote, "Tell her if she wants to write a book about someone, she should write it about herself." Anyone who knew Layne would know that would be something he would say. When I heard that Adriana claimed to have spoken to Layne, I knew the book would be full of lies, and I chose not to read it. The fact that she came out with that after his death made me sick. I regret that I ever spoke with her. In all of his wisdom, he was right again, and I unfortunately had to learn the hard way. She was not to be trusted.

You might wonder why I ever spoke with her in the first place. Imagine watching your big brother, this incredible man, trapped in his addiction, a personal hell on earth, for years and years. When I was first contacted by Adriana, I was so grateful that this woman from another country was so impressed by him, and wanted to tell his story, and honor him this way. I wanted Layne to know, or hear again, how much he was admired and loved, as he was such an extraordinary person. I even had the hope that a book written honoring him, might be one of the things that might change his course. You grasp at straws after you’ve watched someone you love go through such strife for so long.

I'm glad so many people realize what a joke this book was. I hate the thought of people believing her lies, but I know the truth, and that's why I will never read the book. No point.

Staley's last known interview was for the radio show Rockline on July 19, 1999, with the other members of Alice in Chains, to promote the release of the compilation album Nothing Safe: Best of the Box.
