= Patricia Hayes (disambiguation) =

Patricia Hayes (1909–1998), was an English comedy actress.

Patricia Hayes may also refer to:

- Patricia Hayes (historian), historian
- Patty Hayes (born 1955), American golfer

== See also ==
- Pat Hayes (disambiguation)
