= I Don't Wanna Be a Soldier =

Song by John Lennon

from the album Imagine
- Released: 9 September 1971 (US); 8 October 1971 (UK)
- Recorded: c. 11–16 February, 24 May, 4 July 1971
- Studio: Ascot Sound Studios, Surrey
- Genre: Blues rock
- Length: 6:05
- Label: Apple
- Songwriter: John Lennon
- Producers: John Lennon, Yoko Ono, and Phil Spector

"I Don't Wanna Be a Soldier, Mama" (also known as I Don't Want to Be a Soldier Mama and I Don't Want To Be A Soldier, Mama, I Don't Wanna Die) is a song written and performed by John Lennon, and released in 1971 as the fifth track on his second studio album, Imagine. The song's lyrics oppose the expectations of society.

== Recording ==
This song was first recorded, along with "It's So Hard", during the February 1971 sessions that also yielded the "Power to the People" single. The song began as a studio jam. Take 2, described as a raw, funk version of Lennon's song "Well Well Well", was included in the John Lennon Anthology box set. Lennon was unhappy with this version and re-recorded it during the Imagine sessions.

The final version of the song is the only song on Imagine to feature Phil Spector's Wall of Sound effect to its full extent. The wall of sound features King Curtis on saxophone, Nicky Hopkins on piano and Badfinger's Tom Evans and Joey Molland as well as ex-Beatle George Harrison on guitar.

== Lyrics and music ==
The song contains only 25 different words, very similar to Lennon's song "I Want You (She's So Heavy)", from the Beatles 1969 album Abbey Road.

According to music critic Paul du Noyer, the song's structure is loosely based on a nursery rhyme "Tinker, tailor, soldier, sailor/Rich man, poor man, beggarman thief." Besides not wanting to be a soldier, the singer also states that he doesn't want to be a lawyer or a church man.

Some of the couplets in the song match, such as lawyer and lie, while others do not, such as sailor and fly. Music lecturers Ben Urish and Ken Bielen suggest that Lennon generates tension by having his voice rise and fall with each item on the list. They suggest that the song could represent an interior monologue or a child pleading with his mother.

== Reception ==
In a review for the Imagine album, Ben Gerson of Rolling Stone described the song as "an enumeration of all the roles John withdraws from," along with describing Lennon's vocals as sounding "both long-suffering and cruel." Gerson also compared the song's melody to the Kinks' "You Really Got Me". In Christgau's Record Guide: Rock Albums of the Seventies (1981), Robert Christgau called the song "an instant folk extravaganza worthy of Phil Spector". Beatle biographer John Blaney found the song to be "unadventurous" and "little more than an extended jam", but redeemed by Spector's "layers of echo that lend it an eerie texture" and by Curtis' saxophone. Music critic Johnny Rogan criticizes the simple rhyming structure and says that the song "appears to be emulating [Lennon's earlier song] 'God'. but this is a mantra without a meaning, and a lyric with nothing to say."

== Covers ==
The song was covered by grunge supergroup Mad Season in 1995 and released as a bonus track on the deluxe version of their only studio album, Above, in 2013. The cover features lead vocals by Layne Staley. The track was also reimagined by Cowboy Junkies on their 2005 studio album Early 21st Century Blues, including a rap element from Kevin "Rebel" Bond.

Liam Gallagher released a "stripped back" version as a single in May 2023 with "Too Good For Giving Up" as a B-Side.

== Personnel ==
- John Lennon – vocals, electric guitar
- George Harrison – slide guitar
- Joey Molland – acoustic guitar
- Tom Evans – acoustic guitar
- Klaus Voormann – bass guitar
- Nicky Hopkins – piano
- King Curtis - saxophones
- Jim Keltner – drums
- Mike Pinder – tambourine

Personnel per the album's inner sleeve notes.
