= Patrick Barry Hayes =

Patrick Barry Hayes (September 7, 1809 – May 26, 1863), one of the five children of Captain Patrick Hayes and Elizabeth Keen, is a descendant of Commodore Barry, who is often referred to as "the father of the American Navy." Hayes was born in Philadelphia and spent his adolescence and young adulthood in the city until 1830, when he left for careers in Brazil and on the Rio Grande. He returned to the United States in the 1850s.

Hayes lived a colorful life, documented by numerous letters detailing everyday life in Philadelphia and his work abroad. His career included employment as a commission merchant within the exporting house of Hayes, Engerer in Porto Alegre, Brazil, a brief term as Acting United States Consul for the port of Rio Grande, a United States Appraiser at the Custom House in Philadelphia, and Chief Clerk of the House of Representatives in Washington, D.C.

He married Elizabeth Hickman on November 6, 1855, but not before sowing "many a wild oat." The couple had one daughter, Elizabeth Barry Hayes, who married W. Horace Hepburn, Esq., a Philadelphia lawyer, on June 22, 1880. Patrick Barry Hayes died on May 26, 1863, at the age of 53, and was buried in the Hayes family vault at St. Mary's graveyard in Philadelphia.
