= Well Well Well (John Lennon song) =

Song by John Lennon

from the album John Lennon/Plastic Ono Band
- Published: Northern Songs
- Released: 11 December 1970
- Recorded: 1970
- Genre: Rock
- Length: 5:59
- Label: Apple
- Songwriter: John Lennon
- Producers: John Lennon, Yoko Ono, Phil Spector

"Well Well Well" is a song by the English musician John Lennon from his 1970 album John Lennon/Plastic Ono Band. The eighth and longest track on the album, "Well Well Well" features an aggressive guitar sound, screaming vocals and a pounding backing track.

== Lyrics and music ==
The lyrics of "Well Well Well" describe mundane incidents from Lennon's daily life with wife Yoko Ono. Incidents described include eating a meal together, going for a walk, and discussing current events such as "revolution" and "women's liberation." The song also describes the uneasiness the couple feel during these events, but which they cannot understand. Authors Ben Urish and Ken Bielen suggest that this uneasiness is due to guilt the couple feel about being able to talk about issues but having the luxury of deciding whether or not to take action.

One line of the song refers to Yoko Ono as "she looked so beautiful I could eat her." Music critic Wilfrid Mellers interprets this line as evidence of a "cannibalistic impulse" to the song. However, critic Johnny Rogan believes it is more likely simply a reference to oral sex. Early lyrics for the song used a slightly different line: "she looked so beautiful I could wee." In the performance of the song during the One-To-One concert at Madison Square Garden (in NYC) on 30 August 1972, when Lennon says the line "she looked so beautiful I could eat her", he follows it with "and I did", while looking at Ono, who smiles and nods at Lennon.

The melody of "Well Well Well" is pentatonic, incorporating a proper tritone. In the stanzas there is little harmony other than the instruments doubling the vocal line and the thumping drum. The chorus is in call and response form, and uses triadic harmony.

Instrumentation for "Well Well Well" is provided by Lennon, Klaus Voormann and Ringo Starr performing as a power trio with Lennon on guitar, Voormann on bass and Starr on drums. Rock journalist Paul du Noyer describes Lennon's guitar playing as "clenched" and "grunge-like" and claims that Starr's drumming is "some of Ringo's toughest." Urish and Bielen suggest that Lennon's guitar playing on the song and on Yoko Ono/Plastic Ono Band were an influence on punk rock. Music critic Johnny Rogan comments on the "thumping bass drum" which, along with Lennon's guitar playing, makes "Well Well Well" the "heaviest and loudest" song on Plastic Ono Band. Author John Blaney describes the rhythm track as "pulsing," claiming it "echoes the beating hearts" from Lennon's earlier song "John & Yoko" from The Wedding Album.

Lennon's singing on the song ranges between tender and ferocious. In the middle section he screams the song's title with particular abandon. Authors Chip Madinger and Mark Easter call this "the most tortured-larynx singing of John's career." Mellers attributes the screams of the title phrase at the end of the song to Lennon capitulating "to the infant's hysteria, traumatically howling for the maternal breast," as a result of Lennon undergoing Arthur Janov's primal therapy at the time he wrote the song.

== Recording ==
Although the song was released commercially in mono, Phil Spector produced a rough mix in stereo. The stereo mix has appeared on bootleg albums.

According to Ringo Starr, Lennon played Lee Dorsey's "Everything I Do Gonh Be Funky (From Now On)" 100 times while recording "Well Well Well" in an effort to capture the feel of the song.

== Reception ==
Music critic Robert Christgau describes "Well Well Well" as an "unsung great song." Rolling Stone critic Stephen Holden considers the "furious howls" on "Well Well Well," as well as two other John Lennon/Plastic Ono Band songs–"Mother" and "Isolation"– to be unprecedented in rock 'n' roll, which serves as a clear influence to later rock singers like Kurt Cobain. Music critic Paul Evans claims that the Plastic Ono Band songs "Well Well Well" and "I Found Out" are "tougher rock than nearly anything released before the Sex Pistols."

== Personnel ==
The musicians who performed on the original recording were as follows:

- John Lennon – vocals, electric guitar
- Ringo Starr – drums
- Klaus Voormann – bass guitar

== Other versions ==
Lennon played "Well Well Well" live in concert twice, at the two One on One benefit concerts at Madison Square Garden on 30 August 1972. A heavily edited version of the matinee performance was included on the album and video Live in New York City. Urish and Bielen note that the live version is taken at a quicker pace than the studio version, which they believe makes it one of the stronger songs on Live in New York City. Music critic Johnny Rogan, though not considering "Well Well Well" to be one of the strongest songs on Plastic Ono Band, notes that the live performance "works remarkably well." On the other hand, Allmusic critic Richard Ginell calls the live performance "a perfunctory run-through."

An acoustic version of "Well Well Well" was released on the 2004 album Acoustic. The instrumentation on this version include just Lennon playing acoustic guitar. This version of the song contains the line "She looked so beautiful I could wee" instead of "She looked so beautiful I could eat her." Urish and Bielen raise the possibility that since Lennon was singing in a nasal voice and dropping some consonants, he may have been actually singing "She looked so beautiful I could weep." Allmusic critic Stephen Thomas Erlewine calls the Acoustic version "lean, mean...with a heavily phased vocal."

A small portion of "Well Well Well" appears within "Something More Abstract," a bonus track on the CD version of the Yoko Ono/Plastic Ono Band album. On this version, Ringo Starr and Klaus Voormann get to briefly play drums and bass before Yoko Ono tells them play "something more abstract."

== Covers ==
Super 8 covered "Well Well Well" for the 1995 tribute album Working Class Hero: A Tribute to John Lennon. It was included in the soundtrack to Martin Scorsese's film, The Departed, and also in the Showtime series, Brotherhood.

On their 2015 club tour, rock band Cold War Kids often covered this to start their encore.

The Argentinian punk band Los Rusos Hijos de Puta recorded a Spanish version of the song "Bien Bien Bien" on their 2015 album titled "La Rabia Que Sentimos Es El Amor Que Nos Quitan".

The song makes its appearance in the last chapter of the second season of the series For All Mankind.
