= Patrick Hayes (mariner) =

American businessman

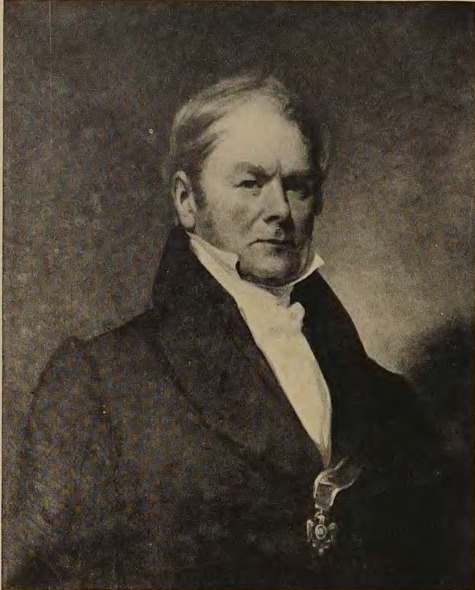
- portrait by John Neagle
- Born: Ireland
- Died: Philadelphia

Patrick Hayes (October 9, 1770 – August 30, 1856) was an Irish-born American seaman and businessman.

== Biography ==
Patrick Hayes was born to Thomas Hayes and Eleanor Barry in County Wexford, Ireland, most likely in or near Tacumshane. His parents died in the 1780s and he immigrated to Philadelphia c. 1786, where his uncle, Commodore John Barry took him in; Hayes eventually inherited Commodore Barry's estate.

== Career ==
Hayes was a merchant and a seafarer, eventually becoming a ship's captain. One of his more memorable naval trips involved a 1787 voyage to China on the Asia.

Hayes held several positions in the commercial and political spheres in Philadelphia. In 1834 he was listed as a director in both the Marine Insurance Company and the Captains' Society. Other societies that Hayes belonged to included the State Society of the Cincinnati. He was appointed Harbor Master for the Port of Philadelphia by the Governor of the Commonwealth of Pennsylvania, David Rittenhouse Porter, on February 9, 1839, a position which he held until April 1842. In 1843 Hayes was appointed Master Warden for the Port of Philadelphia and remained in that position until 1849.

Hayes married Elizabeth Keen, descendant of Swedish immigrant Jöran Kyn and daughter of William Keen and Dorothy Gaylor, on April 8, 1795, in what is now Philadelphia, Pennsylvania, in a ceremony performed by the Reverend William White, an Episcopalian bishop. The couple had five children: John Barry Hayes, Sarah Barry Hayes, Thomas Hayes, Isaac Austin Hayes, and Patrick Barry Hayes. A Roman Catholic, Hayes was a member of the Hibernian Society for the Relief of Emigrants from Ireland.

Hayes died on August 30, 1856, in Philadelphia, Pennsylvania, aged 85, and was buried in the cemetery beside Old St. Mary's Roman Catholic Church in Center City, Philadelphia.
