= Layne Staley =

American rock musician (1967–2002)

- Staley performing with Alice in Chains in 1989

Background information
- Also known as: Layne Elmer
- Born: Layne Rutherford Staley; August 22, 1967; Bellevue, Washington, U.S.
- Died: April 5, 2002 (aged 34) Seattle, Washington, U.S.
- Genres: Grunge; alternative metal; alternative rock; hard rock; glam metal (early)
- Occupations: Musician; singer; songwriter
- Instruments: Vocals; guitar
- Years active: 1984–1998
- Formerly of: Alice in Chains; Mad Season; Class of '99; Alice N' Chains; Sleze
- Website: layne-staley.com

Layne Thomas Staley (/leɪn steɪˈliː/; born Layne Rutherford Staley; August 22, 1967 – April 5, 2002) was an American singer-songwriter. He was the original lead vocalist of Alice in Chains, which rose to international fame in the early 1990s as part of Seattle's grunge movement. He was known for his distinctive vocal style as well as his harmonizing with bandmate Jerry Cantrell. Before his success with Alice in Chains, Staley was also a member of the glam metal bands Sleze and Alice N' Chains. He was also a part of the supergroups Mad Season and Class of '99.

"Man in the Box", the second single from Alice in Chains' debut album, Facelift (1990), garnered Staley critical recognition for his vocal style. Alice in Chains' EP Jar of Flies (1994), debuted at number one on the Billboard 200, making it Alice in Chains' first record—and the first-ever EP—to top the chart. However, Staley's deteriorating condition due to heroin abuse led him to enter a rehabilitation clinic. He began to work on a side project with several Seattle musicians, Mike McCready of Pearl Jam, Barrett Martin of Screaming Trees, and John Baker Saunders of the Walkabouts, which came to be Mad Season, while Alice in Chains went into hiatus.

During Alice in Chains' hiatus, reports of Staley's drug addiction began to gain widespread circulation in fan and media communities, in part due to changes in his physical condition brought on by prolonged heroin abuse. On April 10, 1996, the band returned with a performance on MTV Unplugged in New York; it was Alice in Chains' first concert in two-and-a-half years. The band performed four more shows, supporting Kiss on their reunion tour, with Staley's final live performance on July 3, 1996, in Kansas City, Missouri. Aside from recording two more songs with Alice in Chains – "Get Born Again" and "Died" – and a cover of Pink Floyd's "Another Brick in the Wall" with Class of '99 during 1998, Staley was out of the public spotlight by the late 1990s.

Staley struggled with drug addiction and depression for much of his adult life; he later died from a speedball overdose on April 5, 2002, at the age of 34. He was ranked at No. 27 on Hit Parader's list of "Heavy Metal's All-Time Top 100 Vocalists" in 2006, and at No. 42 on Complex magazine's list of "The 50 Best Lead Singers of All Time" in 2012. Seattle officially declared August 22, 2019, as "Layne Staley Day". Staley earned six Grammy Award nominations as a member of Alice in Chains.

== Early life ==
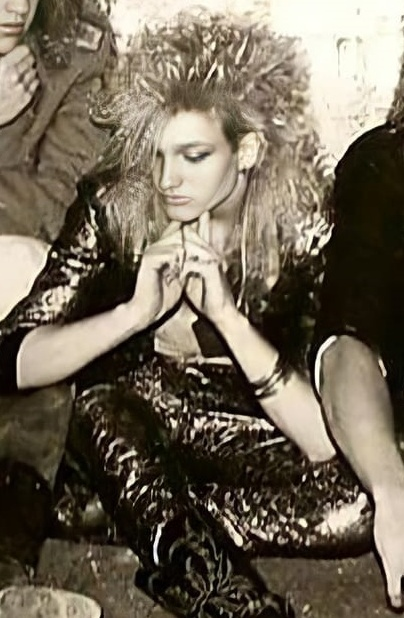
Staley in 1987 as part of the glam metal band Alice N' Chains

Staley was born as Layne Rutherford Staley on August 22, 1967, at Overlake Hospital in Bellevue, Washington, to Phillip Blair Staley and Nancy Elizabeth Staley (née Layne; later McCallum). Staley disliked his middle name "Rutherford" and would get angry every time someone called him by this name. He legally changed his middle name to "Thomas" during his teens because he was a fan of Mötley Crüe drummer Tommy Lee.

Staley joined a rhythm band in Bellevue when he was two or three years old, and was the youngest in the group. At nine years old, he wrote in his Dr. Seuss book, All About Me, that he wanted to be a singer.

Staley was seven years old when his parents divorced, after which he was raised by his mother and stepfather, Jim Elmer. He took his stepfather's surname while enrolled in Meadowdale High School in Lynnwood, and was known for some time as Layne Elmer.

Staley was raised as a Christian Scientist. However, he was critical of religion in his adult life, stating in a 1991 interview:

I have a fascination with how brainwashed people get with religion and how they'll give up their money, their time and their whole life for a cause that they're sure is right, but I'm sure is wrong. I think there's a lot of people who are scared of life and living and they want to make sure they get to Heaven or whatever. I try to stay away from it as much as I can. I was raised in the church until I was 16 and I've disagreed with their beliefs as long as I can remember, so when I had the choice I chose not to believe in anything apart from myself.

Staley also stated in a 1999 interview that the song "Get Born Again" is about "religious hypocrisy".

He approached music through his parents' collection, listening to Black Sabbath (regarded by him as his first influence) and Deep Purple. Other favorite bands include hard rock and metal bands like The Stooges, Anthrax, Judas Priest, Saxon, Rainbow, Mercyful Fate, Twisted Sister, Van Halen, and industrial/new wave acts such as Ministry, The Lords of the New Church and Skinny Puppy. He also cited Prince and David Bowie as two of his biggest idols.

Staley began playing drums at age 12; he played in several glam bands in his early teens, but by this point, Staley had aspirations of becoming a singer. In 1984, Staley joined a group of Shorewood High students in a band called Sleze, which also featured future members of The Dehumanizers and Second Coming.

In 1985, Staley and his band Sleze made a cameo in Father Rock, a low-budget movie from Seattle's Public Access Channel. In 1986, Sleze morphed into Alice N' Chains, a band which Staley said "dressed in drag and played speed metal." The new band performed around the Seattle area playing Slayer and Armored Saint covers.

We were just blown away by him – he had 'star qualities' even then. He was much more timid – he looked down while he sang. But the grain of his voice was there, the soul was there.

— Johnny Bacolas describing an 18-year-old Staley

== Career ==
=== Alice in Chains and Mad Season ===
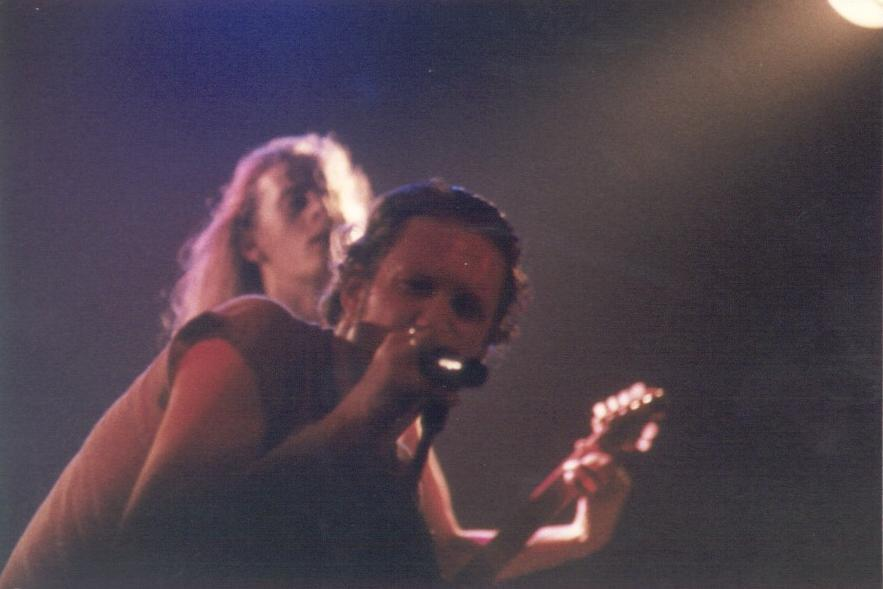
Staley (front) and Jerry Cantrell performing at The Channel in Boston in 1992

Staley met guitarist Jerry Cantrell at a party in Seattle while working at Music Bank rehearsal studios in 1987. A few months before that, Cantrell had watched Staley performing with his then-band, Alice N' Chains, in his hometown at the Tacoma Little Theatre, and was impressed by his voice. Cantrell was homeless after being kicked out of his family's house, so Staley invited Cantrell to live with him at the Music Bank. The two fast friends lived as roommates for over a year in the dilapidated rehearsal space they shared.

Alice N' Chains soon disbanded and Staley joined a funk band, which at the time also required a guitarist. He asked Cantrell to join as a sideman. Cantrell agreed on condition that Staley join his band, which at the time did not have a name and included drummer Sean Kinney and bassist Mike Starr. They started auditioning terrible lead singers in front of Staley to send a hint, which made him angry. The final straw for Staley was when they auditioned a male stripper in front of him – he decided to join the band after that. Cantrell said this about Staley's voice: "I knew that voice was the guy I wanted to be playing with. It sounded like it came out of a 350-pound biker rather than skinny little Layne. I considered his voice to be my voice." Eventually the funk project broke up, and in 1987, Staley joined Cantrell's band on a full-time basis. The band had names like "Fuck" and "Diamond Lie", the latter being the name of Cantrell's previous band.

Two weeks after the band's formation, they were playing a gig at the University of Washington, trying to fill in a 40-minute set with a couple of original songs along with Hanoi Rocks and David Bowie covers. Diamond Lie gained attention in the Seattle area and eventually took the name of Staley's previous band, Alice N' Chains, then renamed Alice in Chains. Staley got permission from his former bandmates to use the name.

Local promoter Randy Hauser became aware of Alice in Chains at a concert and offered to pay for demo recordings. However, one day before the band was due to record at the Music Bank studio in Washington, police shut down the studio during the biggest cannabis raid in the history of the state. The final demo, completed in 1988, was named The Treehouse Tapes and found its way to the music managers Kelly Curtis and Susan Silver, who also managed the Seattle-based band Soundgarden. Curtis and Silver passed the demo on to Columbia Records' A&R representative Nick Terzo, who set up an appointment with label president Don Ienner. Based on The Treehouse Tapes, Terzo signed Alice in Chains to Columbia in 1989. The band also recorded another untitled demo over a three-month period in 1989. This recording can be found on the bootleg release Sweet Alice.

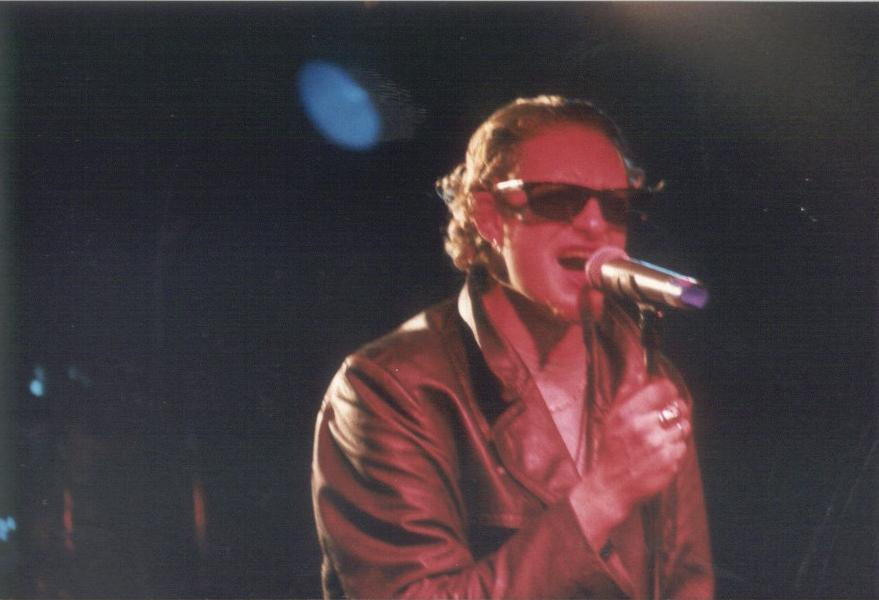
Staley performing with Alice in Chains in 1992

Alice in Chains released its debut album Facelift on August 21, 1990, shaping the band's signature style. The second single, "Man in the Box", with lyrics written by Staley, became a huge hit. "Man in the Box" is widely recognized for its distinctive "wordless opening melody, where Staley's peculiar, tensed-throat vocals are matched in unison with an effects-laden guitar" followed by "portentous lines like: 'Jesus Christ / Deny your maker' and 'He who tries / Will be wasted' with Cantrell's drier, and less-urgent voice."

Facelift has since been certified double platinum by the RIAA for sales of two million copies in the United States. The band toured in support of the album for two years before releasing the acoustic EP Sap in early 1992. Alice in Chains made a cameo in Cameron Crowe's 1992 film Singles, performing the songs "It Ain't Like That" and "Would?"

In September 1992, Alice in Chains released Dirt. The critically acclaimed album, also the band's most successful, debuted at number six on the Billboard 200, and was certified quadruple platinum. Staley designed the sun logo on the album's inlay. During the Dirt tour in Brazil in 1993, Staley saved Starr's life after he had overdosed. Because of Staley's drug addiction, the band did not tour in support of Dirt for very long.

Cantrell wrote almost all of the music and lyrics for Alice in Chains, but as time went on, Staley contributed more lyrics. Eventually, Staley would receive credit for about half the lyrics from the entire Alice in Chains catalog prior to the release of Black Gives Way to Blue in 2009. He also wrote the music and the lyrics to "Hate to Feel", "Angry Chair" and "Head Creeps", and melodies to other songs. Staley's lyrics are largely viewed as having dealt with his personal troubles, such as drug use and depression. Staley also played guitar on "Angry Chair" and "Hate to Feel". Cantrell said of "Angry Chair" on the liner notes of the 1999 Music Bank box set:

Such a brilliant song. I'm very proud of Layne for writing it. When I've stepped up vocally in the past he's been so supportive, and here was a fine example of him stepping up with the guitar and writing a masterpiece.

In 1994, Alice in Chains released their third EP, Jar of Flies. It debuted at number one, making it the first Alice in Chains release—and the first-ever EP—to do so. The other members of Alice in Chains, seeing Staley's deteriorating condition, opted not to tour in support of Jar of Flies. Following the album's release, Staley entered a rehabilitation clinic and began to work on a side project with several Seattle musicians, Mike McCready of Pearl Jam, Barrett Martin of Screaming Trees and John Baker Saunders of The Walkabouts. The band worked on material for several months and played its first show on October 12, 1994, at the Crocodile Cafe in Seattle under the name "The Gacy Bunch". Within a few weeks, the band changed its name to Mad Season. In January 1995, Mad Season performed two songs on Pearl Jam's Self-Pollution satellite radio broadcast, "Lifeless Dead" and "I Don't Know Anything". The band completed an album, titled Above, which was released in March 1995. The first single, "River of Deceit", became a modest success on alternative radio. A live performance filmed at the Moore Theatre in Seattle was released in August 1995 as a home video, Live at the Moore.

During Alice in Chains' hiatus, reports of Staley's addiction began to gain widespread circulation in fan and media communities, in part due to changes in his physical condition brought on by prolonged heroin abuse.

Alice in Chains regrouped to record Alice in Chains, sometimes referred to as "Tripod" due to the cover featuring a three-legged dog, which was released in November 1995. The album debuted at the top of the U.S. charts, and has since been awarded—along with Facelift and Jar of Flies—double platinum status. With the exceptions of "Grind", "Heaven Beside You", and "Over Now", the lyrics were all written by Staley, making this album his greatest lyrical contribution to the band's catalog. To accompany the album, the band released a home video, The Nona Tapes, but the band lapsed again, failing to complete tours planned in support of the album. When asked about the frustration of not touring to support the record, Cantrell provided some insight into how Staley's addictions led to tensions within the band: "Very frustrating, but we stuck it out. We rode the good times together, and we stuck together through the hard times. We never stabbed each other in the back and spilled our guts and [did] that kind of bullshit that you see happen a lot." "Drugs worked for me for years", Staley told Rolling Stone in February 1996, "and now they're turning against me, now I'm walking through hell and this sucks. I didn't want my fans to think that heroin was cool. But then I've had fans come up to me and give me the thumbs up, telling me they're high. That's exactly what I didn't want to happen."

One of Staley's last shows with Alice in Chains was the MTV Unplugged performance in New York on April 10, 1996. The recording of Unplugged came after a long period of inactivity for the band; it was their first concert in two-and-a-half years. Staley made his last performance on July 3, 1996, in Kansas City, Missouri, while Alice in Chains was touring with Kiss.

== Other projects ==
Staley shared lead vocals with Ann Wilson for a cover of Bob Dylan's "Ring Them Bells", featured on Heart's 1993 album Desire Walks On.

The song "It's Coming After" from Second Coming's 1994 debut album L.O.V.Evil features Staley on lead vocals. Second Coming features Staley's bandmates from Alice N' Chains, his former band.

One of the last songs that Staley recorded was a cover of Pink Floyd's "Another Brick in the Wall" with the supergroup Class of '99, featuring guitarist Tom Morello of Rage Against the Machine, bassist Martyn LeNoble, drummer Stephen Perkins, both from Jane's Addiction and Porno for Pyros, and keyboardist Matt Serletic. In November 1998, the group recorded the song for Robert Rodriguez's 1998 horror/sci-fi film The Faculty. A music video was also released. While the other members of the band were filmed specifically for the video, Staley's appearance consisted of footage pulled from Mad Season's 1995 Live at the Moore video.

A song titled "Things You Do" featuring Staley on vocals was part of the soundtrack to the 2012 film Grassroots. In the film, the song was credited to "The Bondage Boys featuring Layne Staley", but the song had been credited to "Layne Staley and The Aftervibes" and "Layne Staley and Second Coming" when it leaked on the internet years before.

== Personal life ==
In the early 1990s, Staley enrolled in several drug rehabilitation programs, but was unable to maintain long-term sobriety. At one point, the other members of Alice in Chains flew to Los Angeles for weekly therapy at Staley's rehab. During the Dirt tour, Alice in Chains' manager, Susan Silver, hired bodyguards to keep Staley away from people who might try to pass him drugs, but he ended up relapsing on alcohol and drugs during the tour. Screaming Trees' Mark Lanegan recalled partying with Staley on tour and said that, "off stage, it was an insane, dark, drug and alcohol-fuelled frat party from start to finish, with Layne [Staley] and I raising hell, behaving like teenagers, staying up for days on end. We partook of whatever drugs came our way. Heroin, cocaine, painkillers, anything." Kurt Cobain's death in April 1994 scared Staley into temporary sobriety, but soon he was back into his addiction. Alice in Chains' managers turned down lucrative touring possibilities and kept the band off the road, hoping that would help Staley. Pearl Jam lead guitarist Mike McCready also tried to help Staley by inviting him to his side project, Mad Season. McCready had hoped that playing with sober musicians would encourage Staley. On October 29, 1996, Staley's former fiancée, Demri Lara Parrott, died of a drug overdose. Staley was placed on a 24-hour suicide watch, according to NME, which quoted a friend saying Staley was taking Parrott's death "extremely badly" and had fallen into a deep depression. Lanegan told Rolling Stone in 2002, "He never recovered from Demri's death. After that, I don't think he wanted to go on."

== Final years: 1997–2002 ==
The apartment building where Staley spent the last part of his life

On February 26, 1997, Staley and the other members of Alice in Chains attended the Grammy Awards after the song "Again" was nominated for Best Hard Rock Performance. In April of that same year, Staley purchased a 1,500 sq ft (140 m^{2}), three-bedroom condominium in Seattle's University District via the "John LaRusta" trust, an alias used by Staley. Toby Wright, the producer of Alice in Chains' third album, set up a home recording system for him there.

In 1998, amid rumors that Staley rarely left his apartment, had contracted gangrene, and had lost the ability to ingest food and was living on a diet of Ensure, Jerry Cantrell told Kerrang! that the members of Alice in Chains regularly hung out at Staley's house. On June 22, 1998, Staley made a phone call to radio program Rockline and gave a rare interview while Cantrell was promoting his first solo album, Boggy Depot. Staley called the show to talk to Cantrell and stated that he had loved the album.

In October 1998, Staley re-emerged to record two tracks with Alice in Chains, "Get Born Again" and "Died", which were released on the Music Bank box set in 1999. Additional reports of Staley's deteriorating condition persisted in the midst of the sessions. Dirt producer Dave Jerden—originally chosen by the band for the production—said, "Staley weighed 80 pounds...and was white as a ghost." Studio engineer Elan Trujillo commented that Layne "definitely didn't look like how he used to look" and noticed Staley had, in addition to no teeth, atrophy in his legs. Cantrell refused to comment on the singer's appearance, and band manager Susan Silver said she had not seen him since "last year".

Staley made his final public appearance on October 31, 1998, when he attended a Jerry Cantrell solo concert in Seattle. He declined Cantrell's request to sing with him on stage. A photo taken of Staley backstage at this show is the most recent photo of him that has been publicly released.

Thereafter, Staley was thought to have left behind his "self-imposed rock & roll exile", when in November 1998 he laid down additional vocal tracks as part of a supergroup called Class of '99, featuring members of Rage Against the Machine, Jane’s Addiction, and Porno for Pyros.

On July 19, 1999, the radio program Rockline was hosting Cantrell, Inez, and Kinney for a discussion on the release of Nothing Safe: Best of the Box, when, unexpectedly, Staley called in to participate. This was Staley's last interview.

From 1999 to 2002, Staley became more reclusive and depressed, rarely leaving his Seattle condo; little is known about the details of his life during this period. Staley was rumored to spend most of his days creating art, playing video games, or nodding off on drugs. Staley's one-time roommate and friend Morgen Gallagher later said that around 2001 Staley said he was asked to audition for Audioslave; this claim was later debunked by Audioslave guitarist Tom Morello.

Staley's mother, Nancy McCallum, told The Seattle Times in 2007 that despite his isolation, he was never far from the love of his family and friends, who filled his answering machine and mailbox with messages and letters. "Just because he was isolated doesn't mean we didn't have sweet moments with him." McCallum has also claimed that she saw Staley on Thanksgiving of 2001, and again just around Valentine's Day of 2002, when he visited his sister's baby. This was the last time that McCallum saw her son. Sean Kinney has commented on Staley's final years and isolation period:

It got to a point where he'd kept himself so locked up, both physically and emotionally. I kept trying to make contact...Three times a week, like clockwork, I'd call him, but he'd never answer. Every time I was in the area, I was up in front of his place yelling for him ... Even if you could get in his building, he wasn't going to open the door. You'd phone and he wouldn't answer. You couldn't just kick the door in and grab him, though there were so many times I thought about doing that. But if someone won't help themselves, what, really, can anyone else do?

Staley's physical appearance had become even worse than before: he had lost several teeth, his skin was sickly pale, and he was severely emaciated. Close friends such as Matt Fox said, "If no one heard from him for weeks, it wasn't unusual". Staley grew increasingly disconnected from his friends and bandmates who repeatedly tried to get him into rehab, but Staley refused. Staley's close friend Mark Lanegan said, "He didn't speak to anybody as of late... It's been a few months since I talked to him. But for us to not talk for a few months is par for the course."

== Death ==
On April 17, 2002, Staley's mother went to his apartment to inform him about the death of Demri Lara Parrott's brother, but there was no answer. On April 19, Staley's accountants contacted his former manager, Susan Silver, and told her that no money had been withdrawn from the singer's bank account in two weeks. Silver then contacted Staley's mother, who went back to his apartment and discovered undelivered mail by his door. Staley owned a cat named Sadie at the time, who was usually quiet; upon hearing Sadie meow, Staley's mother became worried the animal was distressed and that Staley might be in trouble. Still not receiving an answer, McCallum called 9-1-1 to say she had not heard from him "in about two weeks". She entered the apartment with police and her ex-husband, Jim Elmer.

It was reported that the 6-foot (183 cm) Staley weighed only 86 pounds (39 kg) when his partially decomposed body was discovered. Medical examiners had to identify the body by comparing dental records. The autopsy and toxicology report revealed that Staley had died from a mixture of heroin and cocaine, known as a speedball. The autopsy concluded that Staley had died two weeks before his body was found, on April 5—the same day fellow grunge musician Kurt Cobain died by suicide eight years prior. His death was classified as "accidental".

Staley's Alice in Chains bandmates issued the following statement:

It's good to be with friends and family as we struggle to deal with this immense loss ... and try to celebrate this immense life. We are looking for all the usual things: comfort, purpose, answers, something to hold on to, a way to let him go in peace. Mostly, we are feeling heartbroken over the death of our beautiful friend. He was a sweet man with a keen sense of humor and a deep sense of humanity. He was an amazing musician, an inspiration, and a comfort to so many. He made great music and gifted it to the world. We are proud to have known him, to be his friend, and to create music with him. For the past decade, Layne struggled greatly—we can only hope that he has at last found some peace. We love you, Layne. Dearly. And we will miss you ... endlessly.

In 2010, in an interview on VH1's Celebrity Rehab, former Alice in Chains bass player Mike Starr said that he was the last person to see Staley alive and had spent time with him the day before his death, April 4 (Starr's birthday). Starr claimed that Staley was very sick but would not call 9-1-1. They briefly argued, which ended with Starr storming out. Starr stated that Staley called after him as he left and said: "Not like this, don't leave like this." Starr expressed regret for not calling 9-1-1, and stated that Staley had threatened to sever their friendship if he did. Starr also regretted being high on benzodiazepines that night and having walked out of the door. Staley's mother was insistent that neither she nor anyone in her family blamed Starr for Staley's death, telling Starr: "Layne would forgive you. He'd say, 'Hey, I did this. Not you.'"

Starr still blamed himself for the death of Staley, and had kept the story a secret until his appearance on Celebrity Rehab. During this same interview, Staley's mother recalled that he had attempted rehab fourteen times, although it is not clear whether any of these attempts were during his reclusive years. Starr was found dead on March 8, 2011, as a result of a prescription drug overdose.

=== Aftermath ===
An informal memorial was held for Staley on the night of April 20, 2002, at the Seattle Center, which was attended by at least 100 fans and friends, including Alice in Chains bandmates Cantrell, Starr, Inez and Kinney, and Soundgarden frontman Chris Cornell. Staley's body was cremated and a private memorial service was held for him on April 28, 2002 at Kiana Lodge in Poulsbo, Washington. During her appearance on Celebrity Rehab in 2010, Staley's mother said she has kept his ashes in a box. Staley's private memorial was attended by his family and friends, along with his Alice in Chains bandmates, the band's manager Susan Silver and her then-husband Chris Cornell, as well as other music personalities. Chris Cornell, joined by Heart's Ann and Nancy Wilson, sang a rendition of The Rolling Stones' "Wild Horses" at the funeral. They also performed The Lovemongers' song "Sand".

Jerry Cantrell dedicated his solo album, Degradation Trip, released two months after Staley's death, to his memory. Cantrell also took in Staley's cat, Sadie, who he and the family took care of until Sadie's death in 2010, at the age of 18.

Shortly after Staley's death, his parents Nancy McCallum and Phil Staley started receiving donations from fans all over the world. Nancy and Phil worked with Seattle's Therapeutic Health Services clinic to create the Layne Staley Memorial Fund to help other heroin addicts and their families in the Seattle music community.

Alice in Chains remained inactive following Staley's death. For the next several years, the band refused to perform together, out of respect for him. In 2005, Cantrell, Kinney, and Inez reunited for a benefit concert for victims of the 2004 Indian Ocean tsunami, with several vocalists filling in for Staley. Following positive response, the band decided to reunite formally in 2006. Comes with the Fall vocalist William DuVall, a member of Cantrell's solo touring band who often sang Staley's parts on the Alice in Chains songs that Cantrell performed, was announced to sing Staley's part for the reunion shows. In an interview with MTV News, Kinney noted that the band would use the reunion concerts to pay tribute to the songs and to Staley. The band used to have an intermission to include a five-minute filmed tribute to Staley in between sets. DuVall has since become Staley's full-time replacement in the band, contributing to three full-length releases.

== Legacy ==
Billy Corgan of The Smashing Pumpkins stated that Staley "had an amazing voice that had such a beautiful, sad, haunting quality about it. He was different because his heaviness was in that voice." The song "Bleeding The Orchid" from The Smashing Pumpkins' 2007 album Zeitgeist was indirectly inspired by the death of Staley.

Cold's song "The Day Seattle Died" from their 2003 album Year of the Spider was an ode to Staley, as well as fellow grunge figurehead Kurt Cobain. That same year Staind featured a song called "Layne" in memory to the singer on their album 14 Shades of Grey. In their 2004 album Hangover Music Vol. VI, Black Label Society also included a tribute to Staley, titled "Layne". Kat Bjelland, formerly of Babes in Toyland, wrote the song "Layne to Rest" about him on her band Katastrophy Wife’s 2004 album All Kneel.

Eddie Vedder, lead singer of Pearl Jam, wrote a song eulogizing Staley, titled "4/20/02" (the day Vedder heard the news). The song featured only Vedder singing and playing the guitar in a ukulele-inspired tuning, and was released as a hidden track on Pearl Jam's 2003 B-sides and rarities album, Lost Dogs, roughly four minutes and twenty seconds after the conclusion of the final listed song, "Bee Girl". Vedder also paid tribute to Staley during a Pearl Jam concert in Chicago on August 22, 2016, which would have been Staley's 49th birthday, and dedicated the song "Man of the Hour" to his late friend.

Jerry Cantrell said Staley gave him the self-assurance to sing. "Layne was really responsible for giving me the confidence to become more of a singer. He'd say, 'You wrote this song, this means something to you, sing it.' He kicked my ass out of the nest. Over the years I continued to grow, and Layne started to play guitar, and we inspired each other".

Since 2002, Seattle has hosted an annual tribute concert for Staley on his birthday. Venues such as the Moore Theatre, The Showbox The Fenix, and The Crocodile have hosted the event. The show proceeds benefit the Layne Staley Memorial Fund.

Staley ranked at No. 27 on Hit Parader magazine's list of "Heavy Metal's All-Time Top 100 Vocalists" published in the November 2006 issue, and at No. 42 on Complex's magazine list of "The 50 Best Lead Singers of All Time" in 2012.

Staley was an inspiration for the title of Metallica's 2008 album, Death Magnetic. The band recorded a song in tribute to him, titled "Rebel of Babylon".

In 2009, Alice in Chains released their first studio album in 14 years, Black Gives Way to Blue, with Cantrell and then-new vocalist and rhythm guitarist William DuVall sharing lead vocals. The title track is a tribute to Staley. Cantrell invited Elton John to join Alice in Chains and pay tribute to Staley playing the piano in "Black Gives Way to Blue", the closing song in the album. The song was written and sung by Cantrell, who described it as the band's goodbye to Staley. The first concert that Staley attended was Elton John's and he was blown away by it. According to Cantrell, the album's cover art featuring a heart surrounded by a black background was inspired by the heartbreak of Staley's death. Staley's former bandmates also thanked him in the album's liner notes.

On September 6, 2011, Hank Williams III released his Attention Deficit Domination album and dedicated it to Staley.

Staley's Alice in Chains bandmates have stated that one of the saddest aspects of his legacy is to hear him remembered primarily for his drug use rather than the other aspects of his personality. Kinney and Cantrell have also expressed their frustration over the Grammys ignoring Staley during their annual tribute to the musicians who have died in the past year.

In 2013, Alice in Chains' drummer, Sean Kinney, added the initials "LSMS" on his drum kit, a tribute to Staley and the band's former bassist, Mike Starr, who died in 2011. The music video for Alice in Chains' 2013 single, "Voices", features a picture of Staley next to a photo of Nirvana's frontman, Kurt Cobain, at the 2:20 mark.

Since Alice in Chains reunited, Jerry Cantrell started paying tribute to Staley before performing the song "Nutshell". Since 2011, Cantrell pays tribute to both Staley and Mike Starr before performing the song at concerts.

In April 2017, Nancy Wilson revealed that she started writing the song "The Dragon" for Staley in the 1990s. The song was recorded in 2016 and is part of the EP of Wilson's new band, Roadcase Royale, released in 2017.

On what would've been Staley's 50th birthday, August 22, 2017, Alice in Chains released a video paying tribute to him, featuring Jerry Cantrell, Ann Wilson, Mike McCready, and Barrett Martin.

William DuVall revealed that he was thinking about Staley, his grandmother and the Soundgarden lead vocalist Chris Cornell while writing the Alice in Chains' song "Never Fade", from their 2018 album, Rainier Fog. The album's title track, written by Cantrell, is partly a tribute to Staley and Mike Starr.

The Mountain Goats opened their 2026 album Days with "Song for Layne Staley."

=== Layne Staley Day in Seattle ===
On August 22, 2019, which would have been Staley's 52nd birthday, Seattle mayor Jenny Durkan officially proclaimed that day as "Layne Staley Day" in the city in honor of Staley's contributions to the world of music. The day was also a call to attention to the Layne Staley Memorial Fund, established by his parents in 2002.

=== Books ===
Two biographies have been written about Staley, both authored by Adriana Rubio—Layne Staley: Angry Chair released in 2003, which contains an alleged final interview of Staley that Rubio claimed to have conducted less than three months before his death, and Layne Staley: Get Born Again, released in 2009, a revised and updated version of her earlier book.

Staley's family has disputed Rubio's work, stating they do not believe she interviewed him in 2002. When questioned about the authenticity of the book, Rubio refused to confirm the interview was genuine. Staley's last interview was for the radio program Rockline on July 19, 1999, promoting the release of the compilation album Nothing Safe: Best of the Box with the other members of Alice in Chains. The content of Rubio's book, including what she referred to as Staley's final interview, was called into question in journalist David De Sola's 2015 book Alice in Chains: The Untold Story. De Sola questions not only the content of the interview, which portrays Staley as using his lyrics in casual conversation, it also indicates that Rubio never spoke to him, citing her refusal to release the tape with the interview and the fact that not even her publisher had access to the tape. One of Staley's sisters, Liz Coats, likewise doubted the veracity of the book.

Staley was featured on the books Grunge Is Dead: The Oral History of Seattle Rock Music (2009) by Greg Prato, and Everybody Loves Our Town: An Oral History of Grunge (2011) by Mark Yarm. Both books explored the history of grunge in detail and touch upon Alice in Chains and Staley's life and death via interviews with Staley's mother, friends and bandmates, including Cantrell, Kinney, Starr and Inez.

In August 2015, journalist David de Sola released the biography Alice in Chains: The Untold Story, which is mainly focused on Staley and features interviews with his friends and relatives; the surviving members of Alice in Chains did not partake in interviews for this book.

In November 2025, a hardcover book titled This Angry Pen of Mine: Recovering the Journals of Layne Staley was released featuring Staley's handwritten lyrics, personal poetry, original artwork along with rare photos and fan tributes. The book was created and published in co-operation with Staley's family.

== Discography ==
=== Alice in Chains ===
Staley appeared on all Alice in Chains releases from We Die Young up to the song "Died", later taking part in reissues and compilations containing material from his time in the band.

=== Other appearances ===
Other appearances by Layne Staley
Title	Album details	Band	Notes
Desire Walks On	Released: November 16, 1993; Label: Capitol	Heart	Guest vocals on the song "Ring Them Bells".
Above	Released: March 14, 1995; Label: Columbia	Mad Season	US No. 24; RIAA: Gold
Working Class Hero: A Tribute to John Lennon	Released: October 10, 1995; Label: Hollywood	Mad Season	Vocals on "I Don't Wanna Be a Soldier".
L.O.V.Evil	Released: December 15, 1995; Label: Red Rocket	Second Coming	Guest vocals on the song "It's Coming After".
The Faculty: Music from the Dimension Motion Picture	Released: December 8, 1998; Label: Sony	Class of '99	Vocals on "Another Brick in the Wall Part 1, Part 2"
