= The Lamont Cranston Band =

American blues band

- Origin: Minnesota, U.S.
- Genres: Blues
- Years active: 1969–present

The Lamont Cranston Band is an American blues band based in Hamel, Minnesota. It was founded in 1969 by brothers Pat and Larry Hayes and continues today with Pat as the band's frontman. The band is named after the alter ego of the pulp hero The Shadow.

== History ==
"Excuse Moi, Mon Cheri," written by Larry Hayes, was recorded by the Blues Brothers and released as the B-side of the band's single "Soul Man". In 1981, the band scored their biggest hit "Upper Mississippi Shakedown," although it failed to reach the Billboard Hot 100 singles chart.

The band has played with notable musicians such as Muddy Waters, Albert King, Stevie Ray Vaughan, Buddy Guy, the Kinks, the Yardbirds, Kansas, Yes and the Blues Brothers. In 1981, they opened for the Rolling Stones on a leg of their North American tour.

Pat Hayes played guest harmonica on a track on Percy Strother's second album, The Highway Is My Home (1995). It was a reworking of Little Walter's song "One of These Mornings."

== Band members ==
- Pat Hayes, vocals, guitar, harmonica
- Bruce McCabe, piano
- Jim Greenwell, saxophone
- Bill Pelletier, bass
- Tom Donnohue, drums
- Rod Smith, guitar
- Johnny O, guitar
- Tim Wick, organ

== Discography ==
=== Albums ===
- The Lamont Cranston Band (1976)
- Specials Lit (1977)
- El-Cee Notes (1978)
- Up from the Alley (1980)
- Shakedown (1981)
- Bar Wars (1981)
- Last Call (1984)
- A Measure of Time (1986)
- Tiger in Your Tank (1988)
- The Lamont Cranston Blues Band featuring Pat Hayes (1991)
- Upper Mississippi Shakedown: The Best of the Lamont Cranston Band (1993)
- Rock Awhile: The Early Years 1975–1978 (1994)
- Roll with Me (1997)
- Tiger in Your Tank (1999)
- Lamont Live!! (2001)
- In the 80's (2009)
- Live at the People's Fair 1987 (2010)
- Lamont Cranston Band with Bruce McCabe (2012)

=== Singles ===
- "Ain't Nobody Here but Us Chickens" / "Something You Got", Shadow Records (1976)
- "Takin' a Chance" / "E Jam", Waterhouse Records 15002 (1979)
