= John Baker Saunders =

American musician

- John Baker Saunders in Mad Season

Background information
- Born: September 23, 1954; Montgomery, Alabama
- Died: January 15, 1999 (aged 44) Seattle, Washington
- Genres: Alternative rock, grunge, blues
- Occupations: Musician, bassist
- Instruments: Bass guitar, upright bass

John Baker Saunders, Jr. (September 23, 1954 – January 15, 1999) was an American musician, known as a founding member and bassist for the American grunge rock supergroup Mad Season, as well as a member of The Walkabouts.

== Biography ==
Saunders was born on September 23, 1954, in Montgomery, Alabama, to John Baker Saunders, Sr. and Charleen I. Greer. He attended North Shore Country Day School, Rye Country Day School, Fay School, New Trier High School (East), Cabrillo College and Providence College.

Saunders began his career as a blues bassist, working with traditional blues artists in Chicago, such as Hubert Sumlin and Sammy Fender. He recorded and toured Europe with the Seattle-based band The Walkabouts. Saunders also worked with The Lamont Cranston Band in Minneapolis.

In 1994, Saunders went into a Minneapolis drug rehabilitation facility, where he met Pearl Jam's Mike McCready. After completing treatment, Saunders and McCready returned to Seattle and formed a band called The Gacy Bunch with vocalist Layne Staley of Alice in Chains and drummer Barrett Martin of Screaming Trees. They soon changed the band's name to Mad Season. Mad Season's 1995 album Above was awarded a gold record for sales in the United States. It was the only album that Mad Season would record.

In 1997, when Mad Season vocalist Layne Staley left the band, the remaining members tried to revive the band by finding a new singer in Mark Lanegan of Screaming Trees.

Saunders had a relapse with heroin and died from an overdose on January 15, 1999.

== Aftermath ==
In April 2002, Mad Season vocalist Layne Staley also died of an overdose. Lanegan died 20 years later, in February 2022, leaving Mike McCready and Barrett Martin as the only surviving members of Mad Season.
