= Breaking the Ethers =

Studio album by Tuatara
- Released: April 1, 1997
- Studio: Ironwood
- Genre: Jazz rock
- Label: Epic
- Producers: Barrett Martin, Justin Harwood

Tuatara chronology
| Breaking the Ethers (1997) | Trading with the Enemy (1998) |

Breaking the Ethers is the debut album by the collaborative group Tuatara. Released on Epic Records, it was an attempt by members of Luna, the Screaming Trees and R.E.M. to try their hand at experimental, multi-ethnic music. It was produced by Barrett Martin and Justin Harwood.

== Critical reception ==
Professional ratings
Review scores
| Source | Rating |
|---|---|
| AllMusic | 3/5 stars |

Rolling Stone labeled Martin "a post-grunge Mickey Hart." The Los Angeles Times wrote: "Too good for lounge, too organic for techno, R.E.M.'s Peter Buck and his Northwest buddies fashion an instrumental side trip that stands apart from those trends—and yet contains both hip swing and trippy vibes."

== Track listing and Personnel ==
1. "Breaking the Ethers/Serengeti" - (Justin Harwood, Barrett Martin, Skerik) - 6:25
  - Skerik - saxophone, didgeridoo, steel drums, temple gong, bombard, percussion
  - Justin Harwood - double bass
  - Barrett Martin - drums, percussion, marimba, tabla, congas, Tibetan horns, bullroarer, Taos thunder drum, steel drums, acoustic guitar
  - Elliot Haas - bullroarer
2. "Dark State of Mind" - (Harwood, Martin, Skerik) - 4:02
  - Skerik - saxophone
  - Justin Harwood - acoustic guitar, bowed bass, double bass
  - Barrett Martin - drums, percussion, vibraphone, marimba, cello
3. "Saturday Night Church" - (Harwood, Martin) - 4:26
  - Skerik - saxophone
  - Steve Berlin - bass penny whistle
  - Justin Harwood - acoustic guitar, piano, double bass
  - Peter Buck - electric six string bass
  - Barrett Martin - drums, percussion, vibraphone
4. "Dreamscape" - (Harwood, Martin) - 4:04
  - Justin Harwood - bowed bass
  - Peter Buck - electric six string bass
  - Barrett Martin - drums, marimba, bass marimba, steel drums
  - Skerik - vibraphone
5. "The Desert Sky" - (Peter Buck, Harwood, Martin, Skerik) - 5:35
  - Peter Buck - dulcimer
  - Justin Harwood - steel drums
  - Skerik - udu
  - Barrett Martin - percussion, taos thunder drum, tabla, bass marimba, sitar
6. "Goodnight la Habana" - (Harwood, Martin) - 4:49
  - Skerik - saxophone
  - Justin Harwood - Spanish guitar, double bass, percussion
  - Barrett Martin - drums, percussion, congas, timbales, marimba, piano
7. "Smoke Rings" - (Harwood, Martin) - 3:24
  - Skerik - saxophone
  - Justin Harwood - slide guitar, vibraphone
  - Barrett Martin - marimba, bass marimba, steel drums
8. "The Getaway" - (Harwood, Martin) - 5:04
  - Skerik - saxophone
  - Peter Buck - electric guitar
  - Mike McCready - electric guitar
  - Justin Harwood - double bass
  - Barrett Martin - drums, percussion, congas
9. "Eastern Star" - (Buck, Harwood, Martin) - 4:20
  - Skerik - saxophone
  - Peter Buck - dulcimer
  - Justin Harwood - bowed bass
  - Barrett Martin - percussion, udu, dumbeck, bass marimba
  - Scott McCaughey - steel drums
10. "Burning the Keys" - (Harwood, Martin, Skerik) - 6:34
  - Skerik - saxophone, piano
  - Peter Buck - electric six string bass
  - Justin Harwood - double bass, vibraphone
  - Barrett Martin - drums, congas, djembe, marimba, bass marimba
11. "Land of Apples" - (Buck, Harwood, Martin, Skerik) - 5:38
  - Skerik - harmonium
  - Justin Harwood - bowed bass, double bass
  - Peter Buck - slide guitar
  - Barrett Martin - congas, tabla, djembe, vibraphone, marimba, bass marimba, piano
12. "Breaking the Ethers/Serengeti (reprise)" - (Harwood, Martin, Skerik) 1:42
