= WP2 =

Studio album by Walking Papers
- Released: January 19, 2018
- Genre: Rock
- Length: 61:42
- Label: Loud and Proud

Walking Papers chronology
Walking Papers (2013)	WP2 (2018)

WP2 is the second album by the American rock band Walking Papers, released on January 19, 2018. The album was recorded in 2015, but delayed until 2018 due to bassist Duff McKagan's commitments with Guns N' Roses. Band member and main songwriter Jeff Angell stated that the album "perfectly captures the raw, explosive energy of a band primed from extensive touring while at the same time achieving the polish and elevation that comes from experimenting in the studio."

Classic Rock Magazine called the album "a heady and timeless cocktail of dusty blues, atmospheric grunge and classic rock’n’roll that has the history of their home town Seattle and decades of road-worn experience woven deep into its fibres." AllMusic described the album as "Packed with enough dirty guitar riffs to fill a smoky roadside bar," and "another dose of no-nonsense rock & roll from the Seattle-based group," while another reviewer praised the album as "a culmination of groove-infused, songwriting maturity."

On its year-end best-50-albums-of-2018 list, Classic Rock placed WP2 at number 22.

== Track listing ==
All songs written by Jeff Angell.

No.	Title	Length
1.	"My Luck Pushed Back"	3:55
2.	"Death on the Lips"	4:31
3.	"Red & White"	5:46
4.	"Somebody Else"	3:42
5.	"Yours Completely"	4:09
6.	"Hard to Look Away"	3:22
7.	"Before You Arrived"	4:22
8.	"Don't Owe Me Nothin'"	4:46
9.	"This Is How It Ends"	6:30
10.	"I Know You're Lying"	4:00
11.	"Into the Truth"	4:35
12.	"King Hooker"	4:38
13.	"Right in Front of Me"	7:36
Total length:		61:42

== Personnel ==
- Jeff Angell – lead vocals, guitar, piano
- Duff McKagan – bass, backing vocals
- Benjamin Anderson – keyboards, backing vocals
- Barrett Martin – drums, percussion, backing vocals
