= Slide (Luna EP) =

EP by Luna
- Released: March 30, 1993
- Studio: RPM Studios, New York City
- Genre: Indie pop, indie rock
- Length: 27:02
- Label: Elektra
- Producer: Fred Maher

Luna chronology
Lunapark (1992)	Slide (1993)	Bewitched (1994)

Professional ratings
Review scores
Source	Rating
AllMusic	3/5 stars
Spin Alternative Record Guide	5/10
The Village Voice	A−

Slide is an EP by the band Luna.

Released shortly after Lunapark, Slide follows in familiar footsteps of its predecessor. Consisting of two album tracks from the debut (Slide and a stripped-down demo version of Hey Sister) and an original track (Rollercoaster), the rest of this EP is peppered with cover songs and introduces Sean Eden on two of the six tracks. As would become common on Luna EPs and singles, the cover songs provided on Slide have been given the Luna treatment and aside from The Velvet Underground's "Ride Into the Sun", the songs sound remarkably different from their original versions.

== Track listing ==
1. "Slide" (Dean Wareham, Justin Harwood) – 4:22
2. "Indian Summer" (Calvin Johnson) – 5:46
3. "Ride Into the Sun" (Lou Reed, John Cale) – 5:46
4. "That's What You Always Say" (Steve Wynn) – 3:51
5. "Hey Sister" (demo version) (Dean Wareham, Justin Harwood) – 2:58
6. "Rollercoaster" (Dean Wareham) – 4:17

== Personnel ==
Luna

- Dean Wareham – guitar, vocals
- Justin Harwood – bass guitar
- Stanley Demeski – drums
- Sean Eden – guitar on "Indian Summer", "Ride Into the Sun" and "That's What You Always Say"

with:

- Grasshopper – guitar on "Slide" and "Hey Sister" (demo version)
- Byron Guthrie – drums on "Hey Sister" (demo version)
- Dave Kleiler – guitar on "Rollercoaster"

Technical

- Fred Maher – producer on "Slide" and "Rollercoaster"
- Luna – producer on "Indian Summer", "That's What You Always Say" and "Hey Sister" (demo version)
- Lloyd Puckitt – engineer on "Slide" and "Rollercoaster"
- Don Sternecker – engineer on "Indian Summer" and "That's What You Always Say"
- Dave Fridmann – engineer on "Hey Sister" (demo version)
