= EP (Luna EP) =

EP by Luna
- Released: March 5, 1996
- Genre: Indie pop, indie rock
- Length: 21:24
- Label: No. 6
- Producer: Luna

Luna chronology
Penthouse (1995)	EP (1996)	Pup Tent (1997)

Professional ratings
Review scores
Source	Rating
Allmusic	2.5/5 stars
Christgau's Consumer Guide	(neither)
Entertainment Weekly	B+
The New Rolling Stone Album Guide	3/5 stars

EP is an EP by Luna, released in 1996 by No. 6 Records. It consists of outtakes from the band's third album Penthouse.

== Track listing ==
(all songs by Dean Wareham, except where noted)

1. "Sideshow By the Seashore" – 3:14
2. "Thank You For Sending Me An Angel" – 2:06 (Talking Heads)
3. "The Moviegoer" – 4:59
4. "It's Bringing You Down" – 2:14
5. "The Enabler" – 5:06
6. "No Regrets" – 3:43 (Tom Rush)

== Personnel ==
Luna

- Dean Wareham – vocals, guitars
- Sean Eden – guitar
- Justin Harwood – bass
- Stanley Demeski – drums, percussion

=== Production ===
- Recorded by Mario Salvati, Pat McCarthy and Patrick Derivaz
