= Walking Papers =

Severance package is the common use of the term 'Walking Papers'.

Walking Papers may also refer to:

- Walking Papers (band), a Seattle rock band
  - Walking Papers (album), the Seattle band's 2013 album
- Apollo Up! released an album titled Walking Papers in 2008
- Hostage Life released an album titled Walking Papers in 2008
- Zachary Cale released an album titled Walking Papers in 2008
