= Pup Tent =

Studio album by Luna
- Released: July 29, 1997
- Recorded: Sear Sound, Pachyderm Studio, Baby Monster Studios, and RPM Studios
- Genres: Indie pop, indie rock
- Length: 46:46
- Label: Elektra
- Producer: Pat McCarthy

Luna chronology
EP (1996)	Pup Tent (1997)	The Days of Our Nights (1999)

Professional ratings
Review scores
Source	Rating
AllMusic	3.5/5 stars
Chicago Tribune	3/4 stars
Christgau's Consumer Guide	A−
Entertainment Weekly	A
NME	6/10
Pitchfork	7.9/10
Rolling Stone	3/5 stars

Pup Tent is the fourth studio album by the American rock band Luna. It was released on July 29, 1997.

== Background ==
"Bobby Peru" is named after an eccentric, overtly creepy character played by Willem Dafoe in the David Lynch film Wild at Heart. Wareham read the phrase "Fuzzy Wuzzy" in a Don DeLillo book. Wareham said that "The Creeps" isn't terribly good and probably should have been left off the album.

== Track listing ==
All lyrics by Dean Wareham, music by Luna.

1. "IHOP" – 5:44
2. "Beautiful View" – 3:43
3. "Pup Tent" – 5:55
4. "Bobby Peru" – 3:43
5. "Beggar's Bliss" – 3:34
6. "Tracy I Love You" – 4:45
7. "Whispers" – 3:55
8. "City Kitty" – 5:44
9. "The Creeps" – 3:35
10. "Fuzzy Wuzzy" – 5:48

== Personnel ==
Luna

- Dean Wareham – vocals, guitars
- Sean Eden – guitars
- Justin Harwood – bass, keyboards, trumpet, guitars
- Lee Wall – drums, percussion

with:

- Jamie Candeloro – Mandolin and slide dobro on "Beggar's Bliss"
- Barrett Martin – Marimba and vibraphone on "Pup Tent" and "Beautiful View"
- Pat McCarthy – "bits and bobs"
- Mike Russell – accordion on "City Kitty"
- Jane Scarpantoni – cello on "City Kitty"

=== Production ===
- Pat McCarthy – producer, engineer
- Mastered by Greg Calbi
- Jed Luhmann - assistant engineer
- David Voigt - assistant engineer (RPM)
