= The Days of Our Nights =

Studio album by Luna
- Released: 26 October 1999
- Genre: Indie pop; indie rock
- Length: 54:01
- Label: Jericho
- Producer: Paul Kimble

Luna chronology
Pup Tent (1997)	The Days of Our Nights (1999)	Luna Live (2001)

Professional ratings
Review scores
Source	Rating
AllMusic	3/5 stars
Christgau's Consumer Guide	(2-star Honorable Mention)
The Encyclopedia of Popular Music	4/5 stars
Pitchfork Media	6.8/10

The Days of Our Nights is the fifth studio album by the American rock band Luna. It includes a cover of the Guns N' Roses hit "Sweet Child o' Mine".

== Release ==
The album was recorded as Luna's fifth LP for Elektra Records, a part of the Warner Bros. Records music family. Because of the major label consolidations that occurred in the late 1990s, many alternative rock bands signed to major labels were dropped in this time period, including Luna. In an ironic twist, the album was picked up by Jericho records, a subsidiary of Sire Records, which is also part of the Warner Bros. Records family. It was the final album by the band to receive major-label distribution.

The track "The Old Fashioned Way" is featured during the opening scene of the 2001 American crime/drama Kill Me Later.

== Track listing ==
All lyrics by Dean Wareham, music by Luna, except where noted.

1. "Dear Diary" – 4:06
2. "Hello, Little One" – 4:49
3. "The Old Fashioned Way" – 4:36
4. "Four Thousand Days" – 4:21
5. "Seven Steps to Satan" – 4:58
6. "Superfreaky Memories" – 4:53
7. "Math Wiz" – 3:59
8. "Words Without Wrinkles" – 4:22
9. "The Rustler" – 4:07
10. "U.S. Out of My Pants!" – 6:08
11. "The Slow Song" – 3:17
12. "Sweet Child o' Mine" (Guns N' Roses cover) – 4:25

== Personnel ==
Luna

- Dean Wareham – guitar, vocals
- Sean Eden – guitar, vocals
- Justin Harwood – bass, guitar, mellotron, sampling, trumpet, string arrangements
- Lee Wall – drums, percussion
