= Romantica (album) =

Studio album by Luna
- Released: April 23, 2002
- Genre: Indie pop, indie rock
- Length: 44:24
- Label: Jetset
- Producer: Dave Fridmann, Gene Holder

Luna chronology
Luna Live (2001)	Romantica (2002)	Close Cover Before Striking (2002)

Professional ratings
Aggregate scores
Source	Rating
Metacritic	76/100
Review scores
Source	Rating
AllMusic	4.5/5 stars
The Austin Chronicle	2.5/5 stars
Christgau's Consumer Guide	(3-star Honorable Mention)
The Encyclopedia of Popular Music	3/5 stars
Pitchfork Media	7.8/10
Spin	7/10
Stylus Magazine	8.0/10

Romantica is the sixth studio album by the American rock band Luna, released in 2002.

== Production ==
The album was produced and mixed by Gene Holder and Dave Fridmann.

== Critical reception ==
Exclaim! wrote that "there are some subtle advancements here, like the overall production style of knob-twister Dave Fridmann, who has isolated Wareham's languorous vocals more dramatically than on any previous release."

== Track listing ==
All lyrics by Dean Wareham, music by Luna, except where noted.

1. "Lovedust" – 4:00
2. "Weird and Woozy" – 3:12
3. "Black Postcards" – 5:12
4. "Black Champagne" (lyrics by Sean Eden, Wareham) – 3:34
5. "Swedish Fish" – 2:54
6. "Renée Is Crying" – 3:13
7. "Mermaid Eyes" – 3:31
8. "1995" – 2:17
9. "Rememories" (lyrics by Eden, Wareham) – 4:26
10. "Dizzy" – 3:37
11. "Orange Peel" – 3:11
12. "Romantica" – 5:12
