= Weeds (2017 film) =

- Directed by: Kevin Hudson
- Produced by: Brad Simonsen
- Edited by: Michael Weissman
- Music by: Dale Turner
- Release date: September 8, 2017
- Running time: 3 minutes
- Country: United States
- Language: English

Weeds is a 2017 American all-CG animation short film, an animated short film which a group of Walt Disney Animation Studios artists did in their personal time. Written and directed by Kevin Hudson, Weeds uses Computer-generated imagery and 3D to tell a story about empathy and the struggle and distance someone may have to travel—against all odds—to find a better life.

== Premise ==
The plight of Weeds’ dandelion protagonist is a metaphor for people stuck in terrible living conditions (war, poverty, starvation, lack of opportunity and hope).

== Production ==
=== Conception and writing ===
"The inspiration for the story came when I was out front of my house pulling weeds that pop up in my lawn. I looked across my driveway at my neighbor's yard, which was never watered, and the lawn is dead with only a few dying dandelions clinging to the edge of the sidewalk. I thought to myself, 'It's no wonder dandelions keep popping up in my yard, because if I were a plant in her yard, I'd want to be in my yard too!'"
— Writer/Director Kevin Hudson on his inspiration behind Weeds.

The story for Weeds came to Kevin Hudson during the summer of 2016 when there was so much anger directed by people towards Syrian Refugees and Mexican Immigrants. He felt a great desire to say something through his art about the need to have greater empathy for people, who by no fault of their own are stuck in a terrible situation and want nothing more than to have a better life if not for themselves, then for their children.

=== Animation ===
Weeds' production team consisted of 40+ artists, using animation software like Maya, Houdini, Hyperion and Nuke. To inject personality and life in the film's dandelion central character, some of the animators filmed themselves "acting out" the performance of the dandelion, to explore and prepare for their shots. One animator, Wayne Unten, executed a hand-drawn animation pass for his shots to create a foundation for his CG animation, as his was one of the most complicated in the film (a moment where the dandelion pulls itself out of the ground and leaps skyward), requiring some inventive rigging.

==== Character design ====
Weeds' central dandelion character posed many unique performance challenges, among them: The lack of human facial features meant that all of its feelings needed to be communicated through body language—the orientation of the flower petals, and the character stopping moving for select moments—so the audience could imagine it thinking. Since the main dandelion character is a metaphor for a Human, and the primary theme of the film is "empathy for immigrants and refugees," the dandelion needed a human-like silhouette; two leaves became arms, while the leaves on its back appear much like a backpack. Carefully researching the life cycle of a dandelion also helped the Weeds' crew incorporate crucial details in its appearance—how it grows and reproduces, among other things—as its story unfolded.

=== The Music ===
Weeds' original score was created by Dale Turner (songwriter), who used a little guitar from Bolivia called a Charango to represent the dandelion's onscreen presence. In an interview conducted by Animation World Network, writer/director Kevin Hudson elaborates: "As the film has themes surrounding immigration and refugees, this little guitar from South America just fit perfectly. It has this wonderful hopeful and slightly sad sound to it. It provides the soul of the main character, and also represents the life of the water."

== Release ==
Weeds premiered in Encino, CA at Laemmle Theatres Town Center 5 on September 8, 2017. Immediately following its release, Weeds screened at numerous film festivals, including the Palm Springs International Film Festival (November 9, 2017). The complete short was released on Vimeo on November 11, 2017, for a two-week run before resuming its film festival screenings.

=== Accolades ===
Weeds is the first animated short film to be completed within the Filmmakers Co-op at Disney Feature Animation.

Weeds was one of three "commended" (extra) films included in 2018 OSCAR NOMINATED SHORT FILMS: ANIMATED SHORTS, the theatrical release of five Academy Award nominated animated shorts (Dear Basketball, Garden Party, Lou, Negative Space, and Revolting Rhymes) nominated for the 90th Academy Awards. (Released February 9, 2018; distributor ShortsTV.)
