= Penthouse (album) =

Studio album by Luna
- Released: August 8, 1995
- Studio: Sorcerer Studios, New York City
- Genre: Indie pop, indie rock
- Length: 51:14
- Label: Elektra
- Producer: Luna, Pat McCarthy and Mario Salvati

Luna chronology
Bewitched (1994)	Penthouse (1995)	EP (1996)

Professional ratings
Review scores
Source	Rating
AllMusic	4/5 stars
Christgau's Consumer Guide	A
The Encyclopedia of Popular Music	3/5 stars
Entertainment Weekly	C−
Melody Maker	Recommended
NME	7/10
The Province	3.5/5 stars
The Rolling Stone Album Guide	5/5 stars
Select	4/5

Penthouse is the third studio album by the American rock band Luna. It was ranked the 99th best album of the 1990s by Rolling Stone.

== Track listing ==
All music by Luna and lyrics by Dean Wareham, except where noted.

1. "Chinatown" – 4:39
2. "Sideshow by the Seashore" – 3:12
3. "Moon Palace" – 3:46
4. "Double Feature" – 4:27
5. "23 Minutes in Brussels" – 6:40
6. "Lost in Space" – 3:44
7. "Rhythm King" – 3:16
8. "Kalamazoo" – 6:26
9. "Hedgehog" – 3:05
10. "Freakin' and Peakin'" – 6:12
11. "Bonnie and Clyde" – 5:27 (Serge Gainsbourg) (CD bonus track not featured on vinyl and cassette releases)

== Personnel ==
Luna

- Dean Wareham – vocals, guitars
- Sean Eden – guitar
- Justin Harwood – bass guitar, theremin on "Sideshow By the Seashore", Mellotron on "Lost in Space", string arrangements
- Stanley Demeski – drums, percussion, vibraphone on "Rhythm King" and "Kalamazoo"

with:

- Lætitia Sadier – vocals on "Bonnie and Clyde"
- Jane Scarpantoni – cello on "Moon Palace", string arrangements
- Tom Verlaine – electric 12-string guitar on "Moon Palace" and electric guitar on "23 Minutes in Brussels"
- Matthew Buzzell – backing vocals on "Kalamazoo"

=== Production ===
- Pat McCarthy – producer
- Mario Salvati – producer
- Lou Sciancalepore – assistant engineer
- Dave Voigt – assistant engineer
- Susanne Dyer – assistant engineer
- Mastered by Greg Calbi

== See also ==
- Kalamazoo, Michigan
