= Cinemathique =

Studio album by Tuatara
- Released: April 23, 2002
- Genres: World music, post-rock, jazz-rock.
- Label: Fast Horse Recordings

Tuatara chronology
Trading with the Enemy (1998)	Cinemathique (2002)	The Loading Program (2003)

Professional ratings
Review scores
Source	Rating
AllMusic	4/5 stars

Cinemathique is the third album by collaborative band Tuatara. The band expanded to eleven members on this album, and it was their first album for Barrett Martin's record label, Fast Horse Recordings.

== Track listing ==
No.	Title	Writer(s)	Length
1.	"The Melting Sun"	Peter Buck, Justin Harwood, Barrett Martin, Scott McCaughey	3:44
2.	"Love Is A Calculated Risk"	Buck, Harwood, Martin, Skerik	4:21
3.	"Pimpin' for the Muse"	Buck, Harwood, Martin, Skerik	3:57
4.	"Tumbleweeds"	Buck, Harwood, Martin	5:46
5.	"A Thin Gray Pickpocket"	Buck, Harwood, Martin, Skerik	2:56
6.	"Action Thriller"	Buck, Martin, McCaughey, and Skerik	4:03
7.	"Falling Pianos"	Buck, Harwood, Martin, McCaughey, Skerik	5:27
8.	"The Hangover"	Craig Flory, Harwood, Chris Littlefield, Martin, McCaughey	2:49
9.	"In the Passing Lane"	Flory, Harwood, Martin	4:16
10.	"Walking in A Dead Man's Shoes"	Harwood, Martin, Skerik	4:28
11.	"Farewell to the Hero"	Buck, Flory, Martin, McCaughey	5:03

== Musicians ==
- Peter Buck - guitar, bass guitar
- Joe Cripps - percussion
- Craig Flory - saxophones, flute
- Barrett Martin - drum kit, vibraphone, marimba, keyboards, guitar, bass
- Scott McCaughey - guitar, keyboards, harmonica
- Elizabeth Pupo-Walker - congas, other percussion
- Skerik - saxophone
- Chris Littlefield - trumpet, flugelhorn
- Eric Richards - accordion
- Alex Veley - piano, organ
- Justin Harwood - bass, keyboards
