= East of the Sun and West of the Moon (disambiguation) =

"East of the Sun and West of the Moon" is a Norwegian fairy tale.

East of the Sun and West of the Moon may also refer to:

- "East of the Sun (and West of the Moon)", a song written by Brooks Bowman in 1935 that was later recorded by many jazz artists
- East of the Sun, West of the Moon, a 1990 album by Norwegian band a-ha
- East of the Sun, West of the Moon, a 1991 episode of the Rabbit Ears Productions children's television series We All Have Tales
- East of the Sun and West of the Moon, a 1926 expedition book by Theodore Roosevelt Jr. and Kermit Roosevelt
- East of the Sun and West of the Moon, a 2001 novel by John David Morley published only in German: Nach dem Monsun - eine Kindheit in den britischen Kolonien, Malik Verlag, ISBN 3-89029-203-8

== See also ==
- East of the Sun (disambiguation)
- West of the Moon, a 2007 album by Tuatara
- West of the Sun, a 1953 science fiction novel by Edgar Pangborn
