= Bewitched (Luna album) =

Studio album by Luna
- Released: March 1, 1994
- Studio: RPM Studios and Right Track Studios, New York City
- Genre: Indie rock, indie pop
- Length: 45:16
- Label: Elektra
- Producer: Luna and Victor Van Vugt

Luna chronology
Slide (1993)	Bewitched (1994)	Penthouse (1995)

Professional ratings
Review scores
Source	Rating
AllMusic	4.5/5 stars
Chicago Tribune	2.5/4 stars
Christgau's Consumer Guide	(2-star Honorable Mention)
Entertainment Weekly	A−
The Philadelphia Inquirer	3.5/4 stars
The Rolling Stone Album Guide	4/5 stars
Sassy	4/5
Select	3/5
Spin Alternative Record Guide	4/10

Bewitched is the second studio album by the American rock band Luna. It was released on March 1, 1994 on Elektra Records

== Track listing ==
All lyrics are written by Dean Wareham.

No.	Title	Length
1.	"California (All the Way)"	4:15
2.	"Tiger Lily"	4:47
3.	"Friendly Advice"	6:33
4.	"Bewitched"	4:45
5.	"This Time Around"	3:29
6.	"Great Jones Street"	3:36
7.	"Going Home"	5:26
8.	"Into the Fold"	3:14
9.	"I Know You Tried"	3:19
10.	"Sleeping Pill"	5:52
Total length:		45:16

== Personnel ==
Luna

- Dean Wareham – vocals, guitars
- Sean Eden – guitar
- Justin Harwood – bass guitar, vibes and Hammond organ on "Bewitched"
- Stanley Demeski – drums, percussion, vibes on "This Time Around"

with:

- Sterling Morrison – guitar on "Friendly Advice" and "Great Jones Street"
- Grasshopper – clarinet on "Sleeping Pill"
- Frank London – trumpet on "California (All the Way)" and "Bewitched"
- Baumgartner – Hammond organ on "This Time Around" and "Into the Fold"

Technical

- Victor Van Vugt – producer, engineer
- Jen Monnar – assistant engineer
- Susanne Dyer – assistant engineer
- Mastered by Bob Ludwig
