= East of the Sun =

East of the Sun may refer to:

- East of the Sun (Lin Halliday album), 1992
- East of the Sun (Roy Harper album), 2001
- East of the Sun (Tuatara album), 2007
- "East of the Sun (and West of the Moon)", a 1935 jazz standard
- East of the Sun, a 2009 novel by Julia Gregson

== See also ==
- East of the Sun and West of the Moon (disambiguation)
- Di Timur Matahari, a 2012 Indonesian film
