= Rendezvous (Luna album) =

Studio album by Luna
- Released: 26 October 2004
- Genres: Indie pop, indie rock
- Length: 45:22
- Label: Jetset
- Producer: Bryce Goggin

Luna chronology
Close Cover Before Striking (2002)	Rendezvous (2004)	A Sentimental Education (2017)

Professional ratings
Aggregate scores
Source	Rating
Metacritic	74/100
Review scores
Source	Rating
AllMusic	3.5/5 stars
Christgau's Consumer Guide	(1-star Honorable Mention)
Drowned in Sound	8/10
Entertainment Weekly	B+
Pitchfork Media	7.3/10
Rolling Stone	3/5 stars
Spin	B+
Tiny Mix Tapes	4/5

Rendezvous is the seventh studio album by the American rock band Luna. It is the first Luna album to feature vocals by guitarist Sean Eden, on songs "Broken Chair" and "Still at Home."

== Background ==
"The Owl and the Pussycat' is a musical adaptation of the poem by Edward Lear. "Astronaut" is a reworked version of the song of the same name that appeared on Close Cover Before Striking. The album was recorded live to analog two-track, with minimal overdubbing done in post-production.

== Track listing ==
All music by Luna; lyrics by Dean Wareham, except where noted.

1. "Malibu Love Nest" – 4:31
2. "Cindy Tastes of Barbecue" – 4:09
3. "Speedbumps" – 3:06
4. "The Owl and the Pussycat" (Eden, Wareham) – 3:49
5. "Astronaut" (Lee Wall, Wareham) – 4:06
6. "Broken Chair" (Eden) – 3:56
7. "Star-Spangled Man" (Wall, Wareham) – 5:13
8. "Motel Bambi" – 4:29
9. "Still at Home" (Eden) – 5:12
10. "Buffalo Boots" – 3:29
11. "Rainbow Babe" – 3:22
