= Consequences (The Missionary Position album) =

2012 album

Studio album by The Missionary Position
- Released: March 2012
- Genre: Rock, blues rock
- Label: The Boredom Killing Business
- Producer: Benjamin Anderson, Jeff Angell

Consequences is The Missionary Position's second album, released in March 2012. It features songs written by Jeff Angell and Benjamin Anderson.

Consequences was recorded in Seattle, Washington.

== Track listing ==
1. Please Don't Leave
2. White Knuckles
3. Leave The Motor Running
4. The Objects In The Mirror
5. One Eye Open
6. The Key
7. Every Man For Himself
8. The Neon City Night Club
9. How It Feels
10. Outside Looking In
11. Everything All Over Me
12. When I Fall Apart
13. Money to Burn

== Credits ==
- Jeff Angell - Vocals, Guitars
- Benjamin Anderson - Piano, Key Bass, Organ, Piano, Vocals
- Gregor Lothian - Saxophone
- Michael Alex - Drums

Additional musicians

- Barrett Martin (Screaming Trees) (Mad Season) - Percussion, Upright Bass "When I Fall Apart"
- Kris Geren - Guitar on "When I Fall Apart"
- Kolleen Klann - Backing Vocals on "When I Fall Apart"
- John Benedetti - Trumpet on "Please Don't Leave" and Flugelhorn on "White Knuckles"
- Recorded by Benjamin Anderson and Jeff Angell, in Seattle, Washington.
- Mixed by Benjamin Anderson at 2614 Western Ave, Seattle, Washington.
- Mastered by Brad Blackwood at Euphonic Masters in Memphis, Tennessee.
