= The Loading Program =

Remix album by Tuatara
- Released: September 9, 2003
- Genre: World music
- Length: 65:10
- Label: Fast Horse Recordings
- Producer: DJ Logic DJ Spooky               DJ Wally               Michael Franti               Justin Harwood               Barrett Martin               Mister Reliable Eric Ivan Rosse

Tuatara chronology
Cinemathique (2001)	The Loading Program (2003)	East of the Sun (2007)

The Loading Program is the fourth release by collaborative group Tuatara. It was released in 2003. The release mainly consists of remixes of songs from their first three albums.

== Track listing ==
No.	Title	Writer(s)	Remixer	Length
1.	"Morocco"	Peter Buck, Barrett Martin	DJ Spooky	5:13
2.	"25th & 6th"	Buck, Justin Harwood, Martin	Mr. Reliable	4:35
3.	"The Hangover"	Craig Flory, Harwood, Chris Littlefield, Barrett Martin, Scott McCaughey	Mr. Reliable	5:53
4.	"The Melting Sun"	Buck, Harwood, Martin, McCaughey	DJ Wally	6:07
5.	"Smuggler's Cove"	Martin, Skerik, Mike Stone	Michael Franti	5:49
6.	"Land of Apples"	Buck, Harwood, Martin, Skerik	Eric Rosse	5:10
7.	"Sitar Song"	Martin, Skerik	DJ Logic	4:56
8.	"Action Thriller"	Buck, Martin, McCaughey, Skerik	DJ Spooky	5:25
9.	"Falling Pianos"	Buck, Harwood, Martin, McCaughey, Skerik	Mr. Reliable	5:37
10.	"Saturday Night Church"	Harwood, Martin	Eric Rosse	4:49
11.	"Farewell to the Hero"	Buck, Flory, Martin, McCaughey	DJ Wally	6:04
12.	"Dark State of Mind"	Harwood, Martin, Skerik	Mr. Reliable	5:32
