= Dean & Britta =

American musical duo

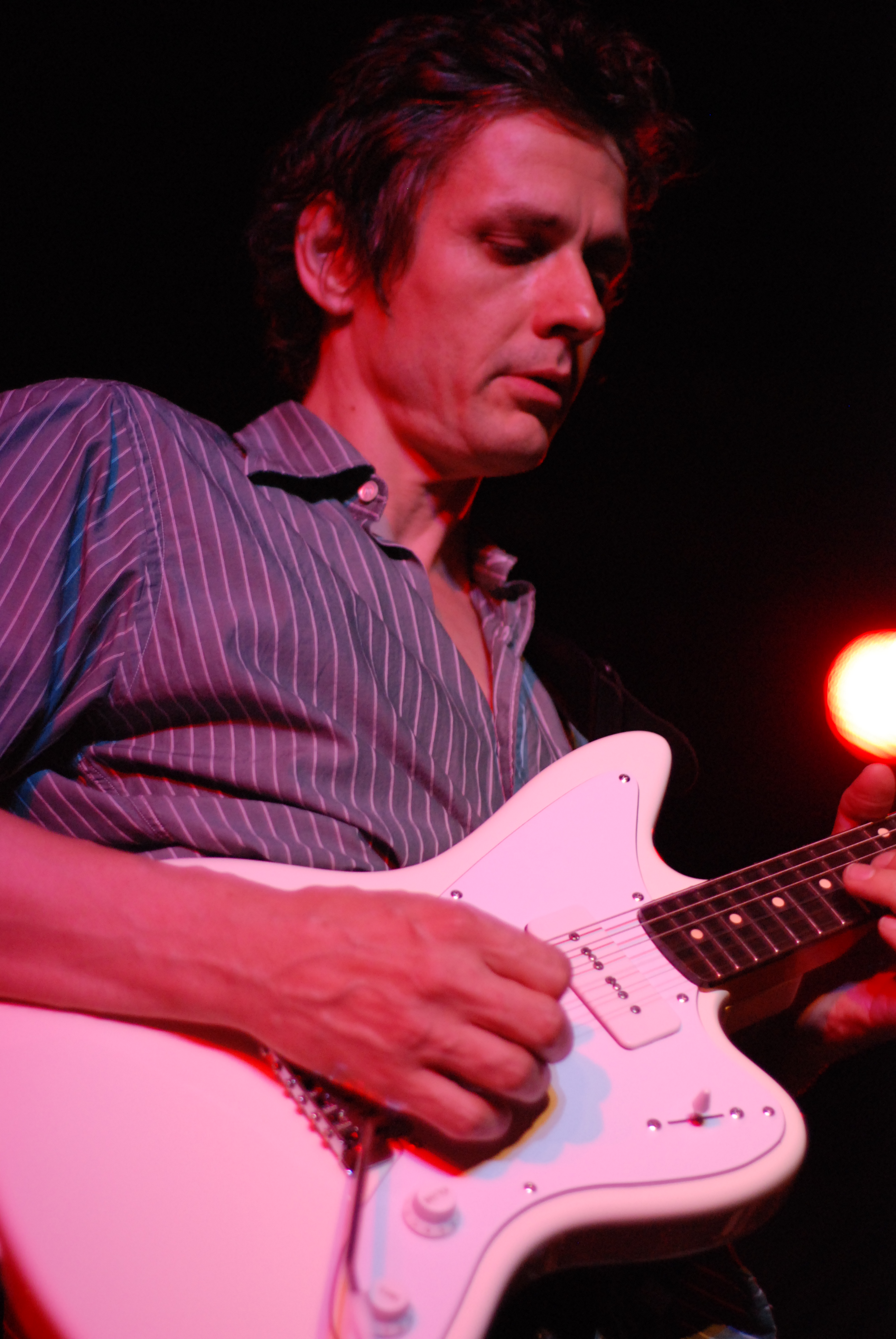
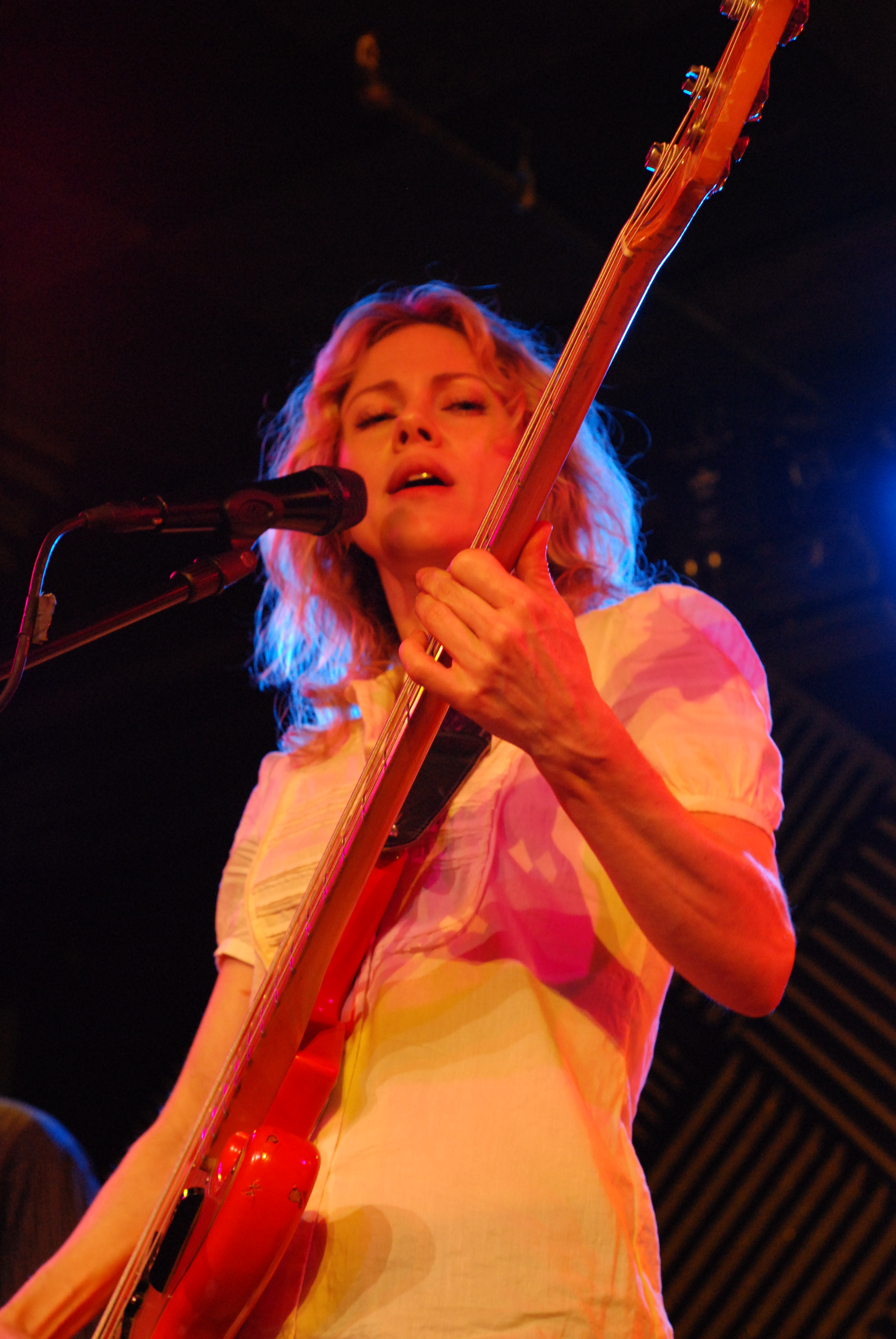
- Dean Wareham (left) and Britta Phillips (right) performing in June 2007

Background information
- Origin: New York City, U.S.
- Genres: Indie pop
- Years active: 2003–present
- Labels: Jet Set; Rounder
- Members: Dean Wareham; Britta Phillips
- Website: www.deanandbritta.com

Dean & Britta is an American musical duo consisting of Dean Wareham and Britta Phillips, both members of Luna. Wareham had formed Luna in 1991 after leaving his first band, Galaxie 500. Phillips joined Luna in 2000, replacing bassist Justin Harwood.

== History ==
Their first album started out as a Wareham solo project, but when he heard Phillips' demos, he asked her to join him. L'Avventura was produced by Tony Visconti and released on Jetset Records in 2003, under the name "Britta Phillips & Dean Wareham". After hearing the album, Peter Kember (a.k.a. Sonic Boom) fell in love with it and did a remix mini-LP, Sonic Souvenirs, also released on Jetset Records.

After Luna broke up in 2005, Dean & Britta spent the next year working on film scores, most notably for Noah Baumbach's movie, The Squid and the Whale, and promoting the documentary film of Luna's farewell tour Tell Me Do You Miss Me. They were married during the recording of their album Back Numbers, also produced by Visconti, and simplified their band name to "Dean & Britta". Back Numbers was released on Rounder Records in February 2007, followed by a limited edition EP, Words You Used to Say.

In 2008, Dean & Britta covered The Cure's "Friday I'm In Love" for American Laundromat Records' tribute compilation Just Like Heaven: A Tribute to The Cure.

== Discography ==
=== Studio albums ===
- L'Avventura (2003)
- Back Numbers (2007)
- 13 Most Beautiful: Songs for Andy Warhol's Screen Tests (2010)
- Quarantine Tapes (2020)
- A Peace of Us (2024)

=== EPs ===
- Sonic Souvenirs (2004)
- Words You Used to Say (2006)
- Variations (2008)

=== Soundtracks ===
- The Squid and the Whale (2005)
- Tenure (2009)
- Mistress America (2015)
