= Close Cover Before Striking =

EP by Luna
- Released: October 8, 2002
- Genres: Indie pop, indie rock
- Length: 29:14
- Label: Jetset

Luna chronology
Romantica (2002)	Close Cover Before Striking (2002)	Rendezvous (2004)

Professional ratings
Review scores
Source	Rating
Pitchfork Media	(7.5/10) 11/1/2002
Robert Christgau	(A−) link

Close Cover Before Striking is an EP by the American rock band Luna. It was released on October 8, 2002 on Jetset Records. It contains two videos ("Lovedust" and "1995" from Romantica), as well as Rolling Stones and Kraftwerk covers. The digital re-release in 2011 added Led Zeppelin and Alice Cooper covers.

== Track listing ==
All lyrics by Dean Wareham, music by Luna, except where noted.

Original 2002 release
No.	Title	Writer(s)	Length
1.	"Astronaut"		4:00
2.	"Waiting on a Friend" (The Rolling Stones cover)	Mick Jagger, Keith Richards	4:46
3.	"Teenage Lightning"		3:30
4.	"Drunken Whistler"		3:13
5.	"The Alibi"		4:12
6.	"New Haven Comet"		4:32
7.	"Neon Lights" (Kraftwerk cover)	Ralf Hütter, Florian Schneider, Karl Bartos	5:01
Total length:			29:14

2011 bonus tracks
No.	Title	Writer(s)	Length
8.	"Dancing Days" (Led Zeppelin cover)	Jimmy Page, Robert Plant	3:41
9.	"Only Women Bleed" (Alice Cooper cover)	Alice Cooper, Dick Wagner	3:36
Total length:			36:31

=== Videos ===
1. "Lovedust"
2. "1995"
