= Luna Live =

Live album by Luna
- Released: February 6, 2001
- Recorded: December 10, 1999; July 15, 2000
- Genre: Indie pop, indie rock
- Length: 67:17
- Label: Arena Rock Recording Co.

Luna chronology
| The Days of Our Nights (1999) | Luna Live (2001) | Romantica (2002) |

Professional ratings
Review scores
| Source | Rating |
|---|---|
| AllMusic | 4/5 stars |
| The Encyclopedia of Popular Music | 3/5 stars |
| Pitchfork Media | 5.8/10 |
| The New Rolling Stone Album Guide | 3.5/5 stars |

Luna Live is a live album by Luna released by the Arena Rock Recording Co. It was recorded at the 9:30 Club in Washington, D.C., and at The Knitting Factory in New York.

== Critical reception ==
Spin likened the album to "Sinatra's In the Wee Small Hours remade by the Velvets."

== Track listing ==
All lyrics by Dean Wareham, music by Luna, except where noted.

1. "Bewitched" – 4:38
2. "Chinatown" – 4:53
3. "Double Feature" – 4:14
4. "Pup Tent" – 6:00
5. "Sideshow by the Seashore" – 3:05
6. "Anesthesia" – 4:43
7. "Tiger Lily" – 5:03
8. "4000 Days" – 4:12
9. "Hello Little One" – 4:29
10. "Moon Palace" – 3:38
11. "Lost in Space" – 3:35
12. "23 Minutes in Brussels" – 7:46
13. "4th of July" (a Galaxie 500 cover) – 4:57
14. "Bonnie and Clyde" (Serge Gainsbourg) – 6:04

Track 3 mislabeled "Friendly Advice" on the CD cover.

The 2 LP vinyl release included four additional tracks:

1. "California" - 4:13
2. "Friendly Advice" - 6:14
3. "Bobby Peru" - 4:03
4. "Indian Summer" (a Beat Happening cover) - 7:07
