= Lunapark (album) =

Studio album by Luna
- Released: 1992
- Studio: RPM, New York City
- Genre: Alternative rock
- Length: 41:44
- Label: Elektra
- Producer: Fred Maher

Luna chronology
Lunapark (1992)	Slide (1993)

Lunapark is the debut album by the American rock band Luna. It was released in 1992 on Elektra Records. It was the first musical outing of Dean Wareham since the disbanding of Galaxie 500.

== Critical reception ==
Professional ratings
Review scores
Source	Rating
AllMusic	4/5 stars
Chicago Tribune	2.5/4 stars
The Encyclopedia of Popular Music	3/5 stars
Entertainment Weekly	B+
Q	3/5 stars
The Rolling Stone Album Guide	3.5/5 stars
Spin Alternative Record Guide	8/10
The Village Voice	A−

The New York Times wrote that "Wareham stills rock-and-roll's hyperactive pulse; he cools its fever and quiets its heart."

== Track listing ==
All lyrics by Dean Wareham, music by Luna.

1. "Slide" – 4:19
2. "Anesthesia" – 3:40
3. "Slash Your Tires" – 4:46
4. "Crazy People" – 3:35
5. "Time" – 2:04
6. "Smile" – 3:05
7. "I Can't Wait" – 2:42
8. "Hey Sister" – 3:41
9. "I Want Everything" – 4:25
10. "Time to Quit" – 3:04
11. "Goodbye" – 2:25
12. "We're Both Confused" – 3:54

== Personnel ==
Luna

- Dean Wareham – guitars, vocals
- Justin Harwood – bass, backing vocals
- Stanley Demeski – drums, percussion

with:

- Grasshopper – electric guitar on "Slide", "Hey Sister" and "I Want Everything"
- Mark Kramer – piano on "I Want Everything", Hammond Organ on "We're Both Confused"
- David Kleiler – electric guitar on "Time to Quit"
- Sara T. Walker – backing vocals on "Smile"
- Fred Maher – acoustic guitar on "We're Both Confused"

Technical

- Fred Maher – producer
- Lloyd Puckitt – engineer
- Susanne Dyer – assistant engineer
