= Walking Papers (album) =

Studio album by Walking Papers
- Released: August 6, 2013
- Genre: Rock
- Length: 48:00

Walking Papers chronology
Walking Papers (2013)	WP2 (2018)

Walking Papers is the debut album by the American rock band Walking Papers, released on August 6, 2013. USA Today called the album "powerful yet nuanced, a kind of rock confident enough in itself that it rarely needs force to make its point." Consequence of Sound was less charitable, saying "It’s a record that largely eschews typical hard rock fare, opting instead for a blues rock that slinks and wafts as much as it crunches and blusters."

== Track listing ==
All songs written by Jeff Angell and Barrett Martin, except as noted.

No.	Title	Music	Length
1.	"Already Dead"		4:00
2.	"The Whole World's Watching"		3:50
3.	"Your Secret's Safe with Me"		4:15
4.	"Red Envelopes"		3:41
5.	"Leave Me in the Dark"	Barrett Martin, Mike McCready, Mark Lanegan	4:18
6.	"The Butcher"		2:52
7.	"Two Tickets and a Room"		5:06
8.	"I'll Stick Around"		4:43
9.	"Capital T"	Martin, McCready, Lanegan	4:55
10.	"A Place Like This"		4:30
11.	"Independence Day"		5:09

== Personnel ==
Walking Papers

- Jeff Angell – lead vocals, guitar, piano
- Duff McKagan – bass, backing vocals
- Benjamin Anderson – keyboards, backing vocals
- Barrett Martin – drums, percussion, upright bass, keyboards, backing vocals

== Additional musicians ==
- Mike McCready – Guitar solo on tracks 2 and 8
- Dave Carter – Trumpet on tracks 4 and 10
- Dan Spalding – Baritone sax on tracks 4 and 8
- Ed Ulman – Trombone on track 4
