= East of the Sun (Tuatara album) =

Studio album by Tuatara
- Released: June 12, 2007
- Genres: World music, alternative rock
- Label: Fast Horse
- Producer: Barrett Martin

Tuatara chronology
The Loading Program (2003)	East of the Sun (2007)	West of the Moon (2007)

East of the Sun is the fifth album from American collaborative group Tuatara, and part of a double album release with West of the Moon. It is the first Tuatara album with lyrics, sung by a variety of guest vocalists.

== Track listing ==
1. "Waterhole" (Peter Buck, Barrett Martin, and Scott McCaughey) – 3:56 (vocals by McCaughey)
2. "The Spaniard" (Buck, Gary Louris, Martin, and McCaughey) – 4:08 (vocals by Louris)
3. "Bones, Blood and Skin" (Buck, Jessy Greene, Martin, and McCaughey) – 4:43 (vocals by Greene)
4. "Silo Spring Violets" (Coleman Barks, Buck, Martin, and McCaughey) – 3:29 (vocals by Barks)
5. "Trouble Rides In" (Buck, Martin, McCaughey, and Dean Wareham) – 3:26 (vocals by Wareham)
6. "Missionary Death Song" (Buck, Martin, McCaughey) – 2:51 (vocals by McCaughey)
7. "A Spark in the Wind" (Buck, Mark Eitzel, Martin, and McCaughey) – 2:56 (vocals by Eitzel)
8. "Madrigal" (Buck, Louris, Martin, and McCaughey) – 4:14 (vocals by Louris)
9. "All the Colors in the World" (Buck, Martin, McCaughey, Mark Olson) – 4:40 (vocals by Olson and Victoria Williams)
10. "Orpheus Must Die" (Buck, John Wesley Harding, Martin, and McCaughey) – 3:20 (vocals by Harding and Gina Sala)
11. "Your Ghost Town" (Buck, Martin, McCaughey, and Wareham) – 1:12 (vocals by Wareham)
12. "Thank You Jesus" (Barks, Buck, Martin, and McCaughey) – 1:26 (vocals by Barks)
13. "Rainbow Drops" (Buck, Martin, McCaughey, and Victoria Williams) – 2:50 (vocals by Williams)
14. "Love Is" (Buck, Louris, Martin, and McCaughey) – 4:50 (vocals by Louris)
15. "Oxman Spoonmaker" (Barks, Buck, Martin, and McCaughey) – 3:47 (vocals by Barks)

== Tuatara members ==
- Peter Buck – acoustic and electric guitars, banjo, dulcimer
- Dave Carter – trumpet
- Jessy Greene – violin, cello
- Kevin Hudson – electric and upright bass
- Barrett Martin – drums, vibraphone, piano, organ, Arabic drums, percussion, backing vocals
- Scott McCaughey – acoustic and electric guitars, piano, organ, harmonica, backing vocals
- Elizabeth Pupo-Walker – percussion
