= 13 Most Beautiful: Songs for Andy Warhol's Screen Tests =

13 Most Beautiful...Songs for Andy Warhol's Screen Tests

Studio album by Dean & Britta
- Released: July 27, 2010
- Label: Double Feature Records

Dean & Britta chronology
Back Numbers (2007)	13 Most Beautiful...Songs for Andy Warhol's Screen Tests (2010)

Professional ratings
Review scores
Source	Rating
The A.V. Club	B-
AllMusic	4/5 stars
Drowned in Sound	8/10
PopMatters	4/5 stars
Tiny Mix Tapes	3/5 stars

13 Most Beautiful...Songs for Andy Warhol's Screen Tests (2010) is the third studio album by Dean & Britta. It was commissioned by the Pittsburgh Cultural Trust and The Andy Warhol Museum in Pittsburgh, Pennsylvania, and was written to accompany a collection of screen tests filmed in the 1960s by Andy Warhol featuring stars from The Factory including Lou Reed, Nico, and Edie Sedgwick. The album consists of 21 tracks, including several remixes, and is heavily influenced by the sound of the Velvet Underground.

== Track listing ==
1. "Silver Factory Theme" – 5:05
2. I'll Keep It with Mine (Scott Hardkiss Remix)" – 4:51
3. "Not a Young Man Anymore (My Robot Friend Remix)" – 3:09
4. "I Found It Not So" – 4:02
5. "It Don't Rain in Beverly Hills (Scott Hardkiss Remix)" – 4:47
6. "Incandescent Innocent" – 5:11
7. "International Velvet Redux (Anthony LaMarca Remix)" – 4:37
8. "Teenage Lightning (And Lonely Highways) (Sonic Boom Remix)" – 4:58
9. "Herringbone Tweed" – 4:43
10. "Richard Rheem Theme" – 6:24
11. "Knives from Bavaria (Spoonful of Fun)" – 4:29
12. "Eyes in My Smoke" – 3:52
13. "Ann Buchanan Theme" – 4:25
14. "Incandescent Innocent (Sanctus)" – 5:29
15. "I'll Keep It with Mine (Scott Hardkiss Electric Remix)" – 5:09
16. "Silver Factory Redux (Sonic Boom Remix)" – 5:37
17. "Not a Young Man Anymore" – 4:56
18. "I Found It Not So (Sonic Boom Remix)" – 4:03
19. "It Don't Rain in Beverly Hills" – 4:20
20. "International Velvet Theme" – 4:29
21. "Teenage Lightning (And Lonely Highways)" – 4:40
