= L'Avventura (album) =

Studio album by Dean & Britta
- Released: June 3, 2003
- Recorded: 2003
- Genre: Indie pop
- Length: 44:11
- Label: Jet Set Records
- Producer: Tony Visconti

Dean & Britta chronology
L'Avventura (2003)	Back Numbers (2007)

Professional ratings
Review scores
Source	Rating
AllMusic	3/5 stars
The A.V. Club	(B)
Entertainment Weekly	(B)
Mojo Magazine	4/5 stars
Pitchfork	(7.6/10)
Q Magazine	4/5 stars
Rolling Stone	3.5/5 stars
Uncut	4/5 stars

L'Avventura, meaning The Adventure in Italian, is the debut studio album by Dean & Britta, released in 2003 and originally credited to "Britta Phillips & Dean Wareham." It was produced by Tony Visconti (Bowie, T. Rex).

== Track listing ==
1. "Night Nurse" (Wareham) - 3:53
2. "Ginger Snaps" (Wareham) - 4:01
3. "I Deserve It" (Madonna, Mirwais Ahmadzaï) - 4:19
4. "Out Walking" (Phillips) - 3:32
5. "Moonshot" (Buffy Sainte-Marie) - 4:33
6. "Hear the Wind Blow" (David Roback, Kendra Smith) - 3:11
7. "Your Baby" (Phillips) - 4:19
8. "I Threw It Away" (Angel Corpus Christi, Rich Stim, Don Ciccone) - 4:29
9. "Knives from Bavaria" (Wareham) - 4:00
10. "Random Rules" (David Berman) - 4:13
11. "Indian Summer" (Jim Morrison, Robby Krieger) - 3:41
