= Trading with the Enemy =

Studio album by Tuatara
- Released: June 23, 1998
- Recorded: 1998
- Genre: World music
- Label: Epic
- Producer: Barrett Martin, Justin Harwood

Tuatara chronology
Breaking the Ethers (1997)	Trading with the Enemy (1998)	Cinemathique (2001)

Professional ratings
Review scores
Source	Rating
AllMusic	3/5 stars
Windsor Star	4.5/5 stars

Trading with the Enemy is the second album by the collaborative band Tuatara, released in 1998. Steve Berlin and Scott McCaughey were among the new musicians who contributed to the album.

== Critical reception ==
Guitar Player noted that "traces of jazz, afro-pop, and the Starsky & Hutch theme seep through the layers of guitars, saxophones, and vibraphones." The Windsor Star praised the "Ventures-influenced surf tune ('Afterburner'), a funky tribute to deceased Nigerian musician/activist Fela Kuti ('Fela the Conqueror') and an idyllic folk tune that is propelled by Buck's mandolin ('Angel and the Ass')."

== Track listing ==
1. "The Streets of New Delhi" (Justin Harwood and Barrett Martin) - 5:05
2. "Smuggler's Cove" (Martin, Skerik, and Mike Stone) - 5:42
3. "Night in the Emerald City" (Harwood and Martin) - 7:32
4. "The Bender" (Harwood, Martin, and Skerik) - 5:13
5. "Negotiation" (Steve Berlin, Peter Buck, Harwood, Martin, Scott McCaughey, Skerik, and Stone) - 3:21
6. "Fela the Conqueror" (Harwood, Martin, and Skerik) - 6:11
7. "Wormwood" (Berlin, Harwood, Martin, and Skerik) - 5:34
8. "Koto Song (The Old Shinjuku Trail)" (Berlin, Martin, and McCaughey) - 6:34
9. "L' Espionnage Pomme de Terre Buck" (Buck, Harwood, Martin, McCaughey, and Skerik) - 6:26
10. "Angel and the Ass" (Buck, Harwood, and Martin) - 3:14
11. "P.C.H." (Buck, Harwood, and Martin) - 3:24
12. "Afterburner" (Harwood, Martin, and Skerik) - 7:49

== Personnel ==
- Steve Berlin
- Peter Buck
- Craig Flory
- Justin Harwood
- Barrett Martin
- Scott McCaughey
- Elizabeth Pupo-Walker
- Skerik
- Mike Stone

== In movies ==
- Tracks "The Bender" and "Afterburner" were used in 2001 Polish comedy-action film "Bulgarski Pościkk" directed by Bartosz Walaszek.
