= Barrett Martin =

American drummer

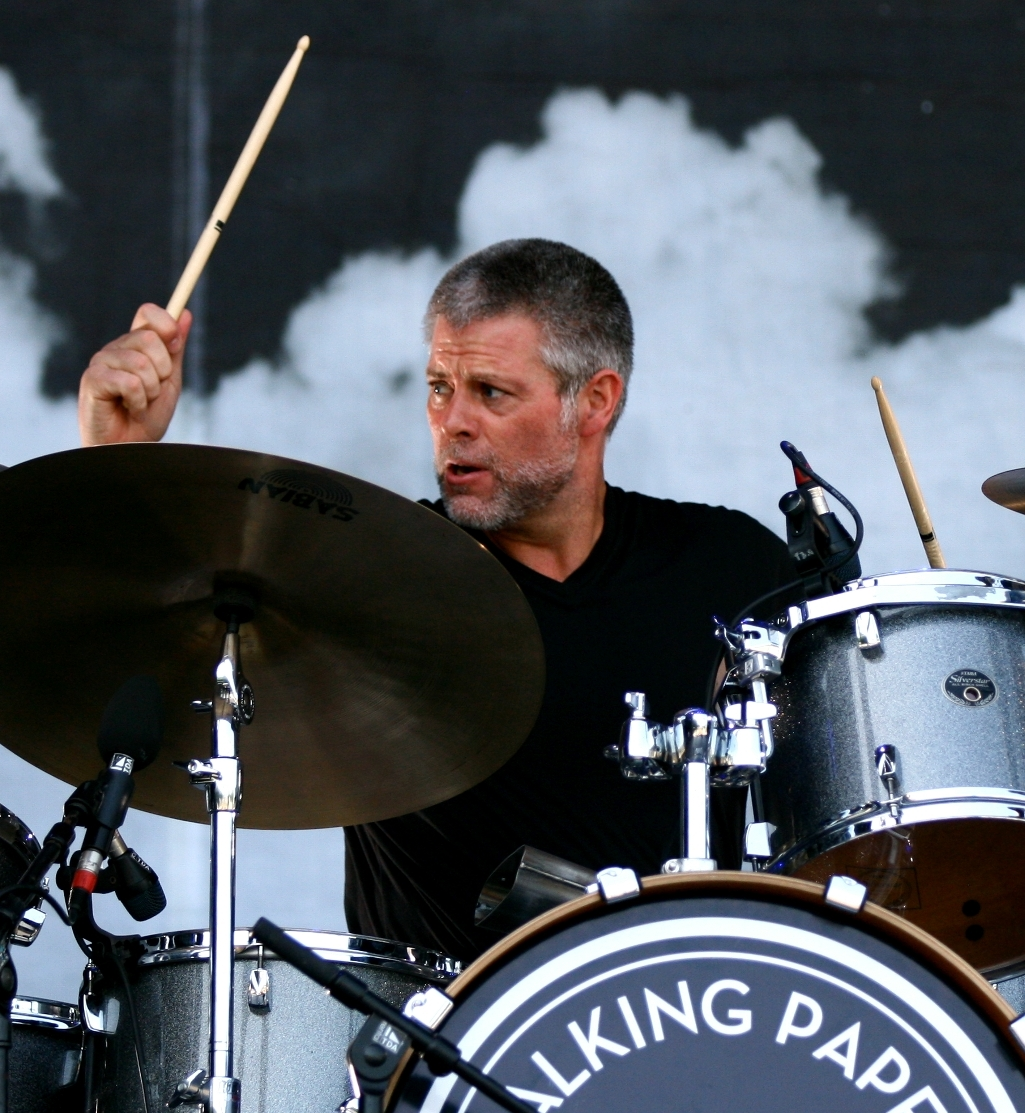
- Martin with Walking Papers at Rock im Park 2014

Background information
- Born: April 14, 1967 (age 59); Olympia, Washington, U.S.
- Origin: Seattle, Washington, U.S.
- Genres: Alternative rock, modern jazz, jazz fusion, delta blues, grunge
- Occupations: Drummer, producer, composer, author, ethnomusicologist
- Instruments: Drums, percussion
- Years active: 1987–present
- Website: barrettmartin.com

Barrett Harrington Martin (born April 14, 1967) is an American drummer and record producer from Washington. He is perhaps best known for his work with the alternative rock bands Screaming Trees and Mad Season. He was also a member of Skin Yard, Tuatara, and Walking Papers, and has performed as a session musician for many artists in a variety of genres. As a producer, he has won one Latin Grammy and has been nominated in two other categories. As an ethnomusicologist, he has produced two albums for the Shipibo Shamans in the Peruvian Amazon Rainforest, and one album for the Neets'ai Gwich'in in the Alaskan Arctic.

== Biography ==
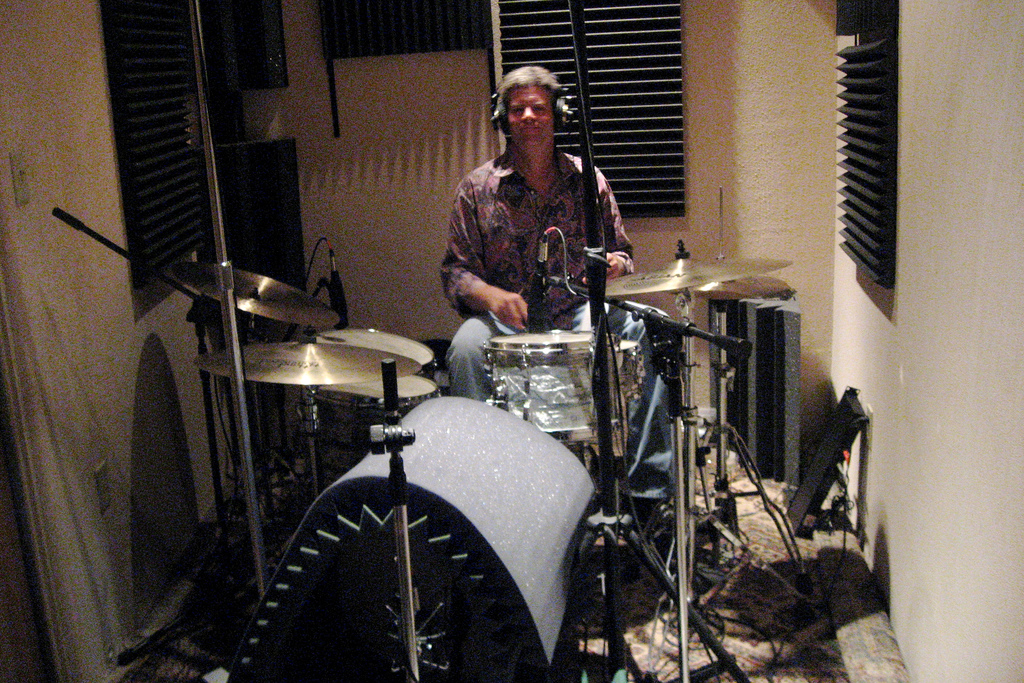
Martin in 2006

Martin was born and raised in Olympia, Washington, and studied music for two years at Western Washington University before dropping out and moving to Seattle to join that city's late-1980s alternative rock scene. He later earned bachelor's and master's degrees in ethnomusicology from the University of New Mexico graduating Summa Cum Laude.

Martin joined Skin Yard in 1990 and played on their fourth and fifth studio albums. While still a member of Skin Yard, Martin was recruited by Screaming Trees and played on their successful 1992 album Sweet Oblivion. He then joined Screaming Trees full-time and remained with that band until it split in 2000. In the meantime, Martin formed the grunge supergroup Mad Season with Mike McCready, Layne Staley, and Baker Saunders; that band released the album Above in 1995, after which the members returned to their full-time bands. Martin formed another supergroup, Tuatara, in 1996 with Peter Buck; Martin produced nine albums with this group until it split in 2014.

Martin was ordained as a Zen monk in 2000, and started the company Sunyata Records & Books (now known as Sunyata Media) in 2001. He began recording as Barrett Martin Group in 2004, and has released ten studio albums under that name. He was appointed adjunct professor of ethnomusicology at Antioch University-Seattle from 2010 to 2017.

Martin formed the supergroup Walking Papers with Jeff Angell and Duff McKagan in 2012, and played on that band's first two albums. In 2013 he started writing a music and culture blog for The Huffington Post, and frequently writes for Riot Material. Martin won the ASCAP Deems Taylor/Virgil Thomson Award in 2014 for his writing. He formed yet another supergroup, Levee Walkers, with McKagan and McCready in 2016.

In 2016, Martin produced the album Jardim-Pomar by Brazilian musician Nando Reis, which won a Latin Grammy the following year. In 2017, Martin published the book The Singing Earth, recounting his musical experiences in multiple genres and nations. His second book The Way of the Zen Cowboy was published in 2019. In recent years he has produced albums for CeDell Davis (Even The Devil Gets The Blues) and Ayron Jones Joy Harjo (I Pray For My Enemies), Hector Tellez Jr. His third book The Greatest Band That Ever Wasn't: The Story Of The Roughest, Toughest, Most Hell-Raising Band To Ever Come Out Of The Pacific Northwest, The Screaming Trees was released in 2023.

In 2019, Martin formed the supergroup Silverlites (featuring R.E.M.'s Peter Buck, The Black Crowes' Rich Robinson, and singer/songwriter Joseph Arthur) and released their self-titled debut in 2024.

== Discography ==
=== Barrett Martin Group ===
- The Painted Desert – 2004
- Earthspeaker – 2006
- Zenga – 2009
- Atlas – 2011
- Artifact – 2012
- Transcendence – 2018
- Songs of the Firebird – 2019
- Indwell – 2019
- Stillpoint – 2020
- Scattered Diamonds – 2020

=== Mad Season ===
- Above – 1995
- Above (Deluxe Edition) – 2013

=== Screaming Trees ===
- Sweet Oblivion – 1992
- Dust – 1996
- Last Words: The Final Recordings – 2011

=== Shipibo Shamans ===
- Woven Songs Of The Amazon – 2006
- Woven Songs Of The Amazon II – 2019

=== Skin Yard ===
- 1000 Smiling Knuckles – 1991
- Inside the Eye – 1993
- Start at the Top – 2001

=== Tuatara ===
- Breaking the Ethers – 1997
- Trading with the Enemy – 1998
- Cinemathique – 2002
- The Loading Program – 2003
- East of the Sun – 2007
- West of the Moon – 2007
- The Here and the Gone – 2009
- Underworld – 2014
- Shamanic Nights: Live in the City – 2016

=== Walking Papers ===
- Walking Papers – 2012
- WP2 – 2018

=== Others ===
- Thin Men – A Round Hear – 1989
- Mike Johnson – Where Am I – 1994
- Various Artists – Working Class Hero – 1995
- Seaweed – Spanaway – 1995
- Mike Johnson – Year of Mondays – 1996
- Luna – Pup Tent – 1997
- Mark Eitzel – West – 1997
- Protein – Ever Since I was a Kid – 1997
- Various Artists – Flying Traps – 1997
- R.E.M. – Up – 1998
- Mark Lanegan – I'll Take Care of You – 1999
- Stone Temple Pilots – No. 4 – 1999
- Various Artists – More Oar – 1999
- Victoria Williams – Water to Drink – 2000
- Mark Olson – My Own Jo Ellen – 2000
- The Twilight Singers – Twilight as Played by The Twilight Singers – 2000
- Nando Reis – Para Quando o Arco-Íris Encontrar o Pote de Ouro – 2000
- Queens of the Stone Age – Rated R – 2000
- Therapy? – Shameless – 2001
- Nando Reis – Infernal – 2001
- CeDell Davis – When Lightnin' Struck the Pine – 2002
- Alex Veley – Maconha Baiana – 2003
- Nando Reis – A Letra A – 2003
- Nero – Confession No. 1 – 2003
- Roger Greenway – Wayt – 2004
- Jack Endino – Permanent Fatal Error – 2005
- Shipibo Shamans – Woven Songs of the Amazon – 2006
- Bola Abimbola – Ara Kenge – 2006
- Dave Carter – Commitment and Change – 2008
- Under The Rose – Under the Rose – 2009
- Rusty Willoughby – CoBirds Unite – 2010
- Nando Reis e Os Infernais – Sei – 2012
- Mark Lanegan – Imitations – 2013
- Vaudeville Etiquette – Debutantes & Dealers – 2014
- CeDell Davis – Last Man Standing – 2015
- CeDell Davis – Even The Devil Gets The Blues – 2016
- Buffalo Summer – Second Sun – 2016
- Ayron Jones – Audio Paint Job – 2017
- Various Artists – The Singing Earth – 2017
- Levee Walkers & Ayron Jones – 2017
- Walking Papers – WP2 – 2018
- Shipibo Shamans – Woven Songs of the Amazon II – 2019
- Arctic Neets'ai Gwich'in – A Message to the World – 2020
- Buffalo Summer – Desolation Blue – 2020
- Joy Harjo – I Pray for My Enemies – 2021
- Ayron Jones – Child of the State – 2021
- Jack Endino – Set Myself On Fire – 2021
- Hector Tellez Jr. – The Great Unknown 2023
- Nando Reis – Uma Estrela Misteriosa Revelará o Segredo – 2024

=== Film soundtracks ===
- Deceiver – 1998
- The Best Men – 1999
- Lush – 1999
- The Fog Ravens – 2003
- Ausangate – 2006
- Woven Songs of the Amazon – 2006
- The Last Bluesman – 2022
