= When Lightnin' Struck the Pine =

Studio album by CeDell Davis
- Released: 2002
- Genre: Blues
- Label: Fast Horse
- Producer: Joe Cripps

CeDell Davis chronology
The Horror of It All (1998)	When Lightnin' Struck the Pine (2002)	Highway 61 (2003)

When Lightnin' Struck the Pine is an album by the American musician CeDell Davis, released in 2002. It was released through Fast Horse Recordings, a label co-owned by some of the members of Davis's backing band. Davis supported the album with a North American tour.

== Production ==
Recorded in Dallas and Denton, Texas, the album was produced by Joe Cripps. Davis was backed by the band Tuatara; he was leery of creating a "primitive blues" sound, and desired the bigger sound of a full band. Davis used a butter knife as his guitar slide. "Woke Up This Morning" is a cover of the B. B. King song. "So Long, I Hate to See You Go" is a version of Lowell Fulson's "Reconsider Baby".

== Critical reception ==
Professional ratings
Review scores
Source	Rating
AllMusic	4/5 stars
Chicago Sun-Times	3.5/4 stars
Robert Christgau	B+
The Penguin Guide to Blues Recordings	3.5/4 stars
Pittsburgh Post-Gazette	4/4 stars

Robert Christgau concluded that "it'll sure stick to your ribs longer than what Jon Spencer stewed up with R.L. Burnside—long enough to take you back to Davis's 1994 Fat Possum comp." The Chicago Tribune opined that, "despite some funny muttered-word asides, the record is a little too clean and professional, and Davis holds back instead of asserting his slurred- around-the-edges personality." The Pittsburgh Post-Gazette said that "the results are deep blue notes twisted and bent to the breaking point, reshaped into surrealistically ragged tones and released to forge otherworldly harmonics."

AllMusic wrote that "it's a glorious, defiant celebration of Mississippi blues, recalling Muddy Waters more than, say, Junior Kimbrough in the deep Delta mud that sticks around greasy tracks like 'Pay to Play' or the closing instrumental 'Hold Me Baby'." In 2012, the Dallas Observer listed When Lightnin' Struck the Pine as one of the "Top Ten North Texas Blues Albums", deeming it "a fairly authentic slab of electrified Delta blues."

== Track listing ==
No.	Title	Length
1.	"Pay to Play"
2.	"Come On and Ride with Me"
3.	"Woke Up This Morning"
4.	"So Long, I Hate to See You Go"
5.	"Give Me That Look"
6.	"Love Me a Little While"
7.	"Cold Chills"
8.	"One of These Days"
9.	"Propaganda"
10.	"Rub Me Baby"
11.	"Hold Me Baby"
