= West of the Moon =

Studio album by Tuatara
- Released: June 12, 2007
- Genres: World music, alternative rock
- Label: Fast Horse Recordings
- Producer: Barrett Martin

Tuatara chronology
East of the Sun (2007)	West of the Moon (2007)	The Here and the Gone (2008)

West of the Moon is a studio album by the American alternative rock band Tuatara. It was released in 2007, after East of the Sun.

== Track listing ==
1. Bird's Eye View
2. Los Angeles
3. Wrong Turn
4. Are You Feeling Me
5. When The Love Is Gone
6. The Old Carving Knife
7. God's Meditation
8. Playing and Being Played
9. So Fine
10. Never Look Back
11. Bang Bang
12. An Invisible Bee
13. The Shifting Sands
14. Kali Rides

== Tuatara members ==
- Peter Buck – acoustic and electric guitars, banjo, Appalachian dulcimer
- Dave Carter – trumpet
- Jessy Greene – violin, cello
- Kevin Hudson – electric and upright bass
- Barrett Martin – drums, vibraphone, piano, organ, Arabic drums, percussion, backing vocals
- Scott McCaughey – acoustic and electric guitars, piano, organ, harmonica, backing vocals
- Elizabeth Pupo-Walker – percussion
