= The Missionary Position (band) =

American band

- Origin: Seattle, Washington, United States
- Genres: Blues, hard rock
- Years active: 2009–present
- Labels: The Boredom Killing Business
- Members: Jeff Angell; Benjamin Anderson
- Past members: Kenny James; Gregor Lothian; Michael Alex (deceased)
- Website: The Missionary Position

The Missionary Position is an American rock band that creates a mix of hard rock, blues and funk influences into their music. The band is from Seattle, Washington in the United States.

== History ==
Following the demise of Angell's band Post Stardom Depression, he formed The Missionary Position with an old friend and fellow Seattle musician, Benjamin Anderson. When Jeff Angell and Benjamin Anderson began playing a Thursday night residency at a club in Seattle, Washington, they hadn't yet settled on a name. Those Thursday lounge nights were billed as The Missionary Position, and Angell said people thought that was the band's name. So rather than fight it, Angell and Anderson embraced what the steadily growing number of Thursday night fans already had—they were now in The Missionary Position.

In 2009 they recorded Diamonds In A Dead Sky and released it on the band's label The Boredom Killing Business. The band supported the release by touring nationally.

In 2012 The Missionary Position released their second album titled Consequences.

The Missionary Position are currently on hiatus recording and performing music. In 2012 members Jeff Angell and Benjamin Anderson switched focus to their new band Walking Papers.

== Discography ==
2009	Diamonds in a Dead Sky	The Missionary Position
2012	Consequences	'The Missionary Position
