= Dean Wareham (album) =

Studio album by Dean Wareham
- Released: March 11, 2014
- Recorded: Removador Fun Ranch, Louisville (KY), 2013
- Genre: Dream pop
- Length: 38:00
- Labels: Double Feature (US), Sonic Cathedral (UK)
- Producer: Jim James

Dean Wareham chronology
Emancipated Hearts (2013)	Dean Wareham (2014)

Professional ratings
Aggregate scores
Source	Rating
Metacritic	75/100
Review scores
Source	Rating
AllMusic	4/5 stars
The A.V. Club	B
Exclaim!	8/10
Filter Magazine	85%
musicOMH	3.5/5 stars
Pitchfork	7.5/10
PopMatters	6/10

Dean Wareham is the self-titled debut studio album by singer/songwriter Dean Wareham, released on March 11, 2014, through Double Feature Records in the US and Sonic Cathedral in the UK/Europe.

== Track listing ==
All tracks are written by Dean Wareham; except * Michael Holland.

No.	Title	Length
1.	"The Dancer Disappears"	3:29
2.	"Beat the Devil"	4:12
3.	"Heartless People*"	4:54
4.	"My Eyes Are Blue"	3:22
5.	"Love Is Not a Roof Against the Rain"	2:55
6.	"Holding Pattern"	4:05
7.	"I Can Only Give My All"	3:10
8.	"Babes in the Wood"	6:19
9.	"Happy & Free"	6:09

Cover design by Sharon Lock.
