= CeDell Davis =

American blues guitarist and singer

- Born: Ellis CeDell Davis; June 9, 1926; Helena, Arkansas, U.S.
- Died: September 27, 2017 (aged 91) Hot Springs, Arkansas, U.S.
- Genre: Delta blues
- Occupations: Musician, songwriter
- Instruments: Vocals, guitar, harmonica
- Years active: 1953–2017
- Label: Fat Possum Records
- Formerly of: Robert Nighthawk, Col. Bruce Hampton

Ellis CeDell Davis (June 9, 1926 – September 27, 2017) was an American blues guitarist and singer. He was most notable for his distinctive style of guitar playing. Davis played guitar using a butter knife in his fretting hand in a manner similar to slide guitar, resulting in what The New York Times critic Robert Palmer called "a welter of metal-stress harmonic transients and a singular tonal plasticity".

== Biography ==
Davis was born in Helena, Arkansas, United States, where his family worked on a local plantation. He enjoyed music from a young age, playing harmonica and guitar with his childhood friends.

When he was 10, he suffered from severe polio which gave him little control over his left hand and restricted use of his right. He had been playing guitar prior to his polio and decided to continue despite his handicap, which led to his development of the butter knife method.

Once he sufficiently mastered his variation on slide guitar playing, Davis began playing in various nightclubs across the Mississippi Delta area. He played with Robert Nighthawk for a ten-year period from 1953 to 1963. While playing in a club in 1957, a police raid caused the crowd to stampede over Davis. Both of his legs were broken in this incident and he was forced to use a wheelchair from that time onwards. The hardships resulting from his physical handicaps were a major influence on his lyrics and style of blues playing.

Davis moved to Pine Bluff, Arkansas in the early 1960s and continued his artistic work. In recent times, Davis' music has been released by the Fat Possum Records label to much critical acclaim. His 1994 album, produced by Robert Palmer, Feel Like Doin' Something Wrong, received a 9.0 from Pitchfork Media, which called it "timeless."

The Best Of CeDell Davis (1995) was also released, with help from Col. Bruce Hampton and The Aquarium Rescue Unit. The Horror of It All followed in 1998. His album When Lightnin' Struck the Pine, released in 2002, included work by musicians Peter Buck, Barrett Martin, Scott McCaughey, and Alex Veley.

Davis died on September 27, 2017, from complications of a heart attack in Hot Springs, Arkansas, at the age of 91.

The Tedeschi Trucks Band album, Signs, was dedicated to Davis as a nod to Col. Bruce Hampton and his love of the man's music.

== Discography ==
- The Introduction To Living Country Blues USA - 1981 (1 track of the 12)
- Living Country Blues USA Vol. 5 - 1982 (4 tracks of the 12 tracks)
- Living Country Blues USA Vol. 10 - 1982 (1 track of the 13 tracks)
- Keep It to Yourself: Arkansas Blues, Vol. 1 - 1983 (4 tracks of the 23 tracks)
- Feel Like Doin' Something Wrong - 1994
- The Best of CeDell Davis – 1995
- The Horror Of It All – 1998
- When Lightnin' Struck the Pine - 2002
- Highway 61 - 2003
- Last Man Standing - 2015
- Even The Devil Gets The Blues - 2016

== Filmography ==
- Blues Back Home (1984)
- The Last Bluesman (2022)

== See also ==
- List of Delta blues musicians
- List of polio survivors
