= A Sentimental Education (Luna album) =

Studio album by Luna
- Released: September 22, 2017
- Length: 39:54
- Label: Double Feature Records

Luna chronology
Rendezvous (2004)	A Sentimental Education (2017)

Professional ratings
Aggregate scores
Source	Rating
Metacritic	75/100
Review scores
Source	Rating
AllMusic	4/5 stars
The A.V. Club	B
Paste	6.8/10
PopMatters	6/10 stars
Record Collector	4/5 stars
Under the Radar	4/5 stars

A Sentimental Education is the eighth studio album by the American rock band Luna, released on September 22, 2017. It was their first release after their 2015 reunion and was issued through Double Feature Records. The album consists of covers of songs by famous bands and artists like Bob Dylan and David Bowie.

== Track listing ==
1. "Fire in Cairo" (Michael Dempsey, Robert Smith, Lol Tolhurst) (originally by The Cure)
2. "Gin" (Willie Alexander) (originally by Willie Alexander)
3. "Friends" (Doug Yule) (originally by The Velvet Underground)
4. "One Together" (Jeremy Spencer) (originally by Fleetwood Mac)
5. "Most of the Time" (Bob Dylan) (originally by Bob Dylan)
6. "Sweetness" (Jon Anderson, Clive Bailey, Chris Squire) (originally by Yes)
7. "Letter to Hermione" (David Bowie) (originally by David Bowie)
8. "(Walkin' Thru' the) Sleepy City" (Mick Jagger, Keith Richards) (originally by The Rolling Stones)
9. "Let Me Dream If I Want To" (Willy DeVille) (originally by Mink DeVille)
10. "Car Wash Hair" (Mercury Rev) (originally by Mercury Rev)
