= Kill Me Later =

2001 film by Dana Lustig

- Directed by: Dana Lustig
- Written by: Dana Lustig; Annette Goliti Gutierrez
- Produced by: Dana Lustig; Ram Bergman; Carole Curb Nemoy
- Starring: Selma Blair; Max Beesley; Brendan Fehr; Keegan Connor Tracy; Lochlyn Munro
- Cinematography: David Ferrara
- Edited by: Gabriel Wrye
- Music by: Tal Bergman
- Release date: September 14, 2001
- Running time: 89 minutes
- Country: United States

Kill Me Later is a 2001 film directed by Dana Lustig and starring Selma Blair, Max Beesley, Brendan Fehr, Keegan Connor Tracy and Lochlyn Munro.

== Synopsis ==
Blair plays Shawn, a loan officer at a bank who is having an affair with the bank’s married vice-president. After discovering that his wife is pregnant, Shawn has a meltdown and goes to the roof to kill herself.

At the same time, bank robbers hijack an armored car. When the police arrive to stop Shawn from jumping, one of the bank robbers (Thompson) accidentally gets caught. The cops thwart the robbery, but one of the robbers, Charlie Anders (Beesley), takes Shawn hostage at gunpoint. They make a deal: she will help him escape if he promises to kill her afterwards.

== Production ==
A large number of filter effects, shutter effects, and jump cuts are used to make long dialogue scenes (particularly between the two cops and between the two lovers) more visually interesting. The audio itself on both is done as a single long take.

Dana Lustig, the director, makes an on screen appearance as Shawn's stepmother.

It was filmed in Canada.

=== Soundtrack ===
Kill Me Later's opening theme was the dream pop song "The Old Fashioned Way" by the New York-based band Luna.

| No. | Title | Artist | Length |
|---|---|---|---|
| 1. | "The Old Fashioned Way" | Luna |
| 2. | "Havin' a Bad Day" | Blue Flannel |
| 3. | "House is Falling" | The Geraldine Fibbers |
| 4. | "Eilat" | Danny Lerman |
| 5. | "She's Still in Dallas" | Hal Ketchum |
| 6. | "For Now You're Just a Dream" | Danny Lerman |
| 7. | "Yeghish Manoukian" | Following the Banks of the Arax River |
| 8. | "Fiction" | Yve Adam |
| 9. | "Streets" | Camillia |
| 10. | "Growing A Way" | Remo |
| 11. | "Shady" | Paul Christian Gordon |

In 2005 the German Industrial metal band Rammstein released Spring. Although the song did not have a promotional music video, an unofficial version which features scenes from the film Kill Me Later, became one of the most watched videos of the band on the Internet.
