= Diamonds in a Dead Sky =

Studio album by The Missionary Position
- Released: August 2009
- Genre: Rock, blues rock
- Label: The Boredom Killing Business
- Producer: Benjamin Anderson, Jeff Angell

Diamonds in a Dead Sky is The Missionary Position's debut album, released August 11, 2009 on the label "Boredom Killing Business." It features songs written by Jeff Angell and Benjamin Anderson.

Diamonds in a Dead Sky was recorded in Seattle, Washington

== Track listing ==
1. "All My Mistakes"
2. "Let's Start a Fire"
3. "Here Comes the Machine"
4. "So Close"
5. "The Big Sleep"
6. "Where the Wild Winds Blow"
7. "Anywhere"
8. "Why Me, Why Now?"
9. "When I Get My Hands On You"

== Credits ==
- Jeff Angell - Vocals, Guitars, Bass Programming, Beatbox
- Benjamin Anderson - Piano, Key Bass, Organ, Synths, Programming, Backing Vocals

Additional musicians

- Kenny James - Drums, Percussion, French Horn, Backing Vocals
- Nabil Ayers (The Long Winters, The Control Group)- Drums on "So Close"
- Gregor Lothian - Saxophone
- McKinley: Alto Saxophone on "Why Me, Why Now?"
- Matthew Postle - Trumpet
- Jeff Rouse (Loaded, Alien Crime Syndicate) - Backing Vocals
- Isaac Carpenter (Loudermilk, Gosling, Loaded)- Backing Vocals
- Najamoniq Todd - Backing Vocals
- Recorded by Benjamin Anderson, in Seattle, Washington.
- Mixed by Isaac Carpenter at MILKMAN Studios in Los Angeles. Additional mixing by Aaron Cramer
- Mastered by Brad Blackwood at Euphonic Masters in Memphis, Tennessee.
