= That's the Price of Loving Me =

Studio album by Dean Wareham
- Released: March 28, 2025
- Length: 36:56
- Label: Carpark
- Producer: Kramer

Dean Wareham chronology
| I Have Nothing to Say to the Mayor of L.A. (2021) | That's the Price of Loving Me (2025) |

Singles from That's the Price of Loving Me
- 1. "You Were the Ones I Had to Betray" Released: January 9, 2025

That's the Price of Loving Me is the sixth studio album by American musician Dean Wareham. It was released on March 28, 2025, via Carpark in LP, CD and digital formats. The album, produced by Kramer, comprises ten songs, with a total runtime of approximately thirty-seven minutes. "You Were the Ones I Had to Betray" was released as a single on January 9, 2025.

== Reception ==
Professional ratings
Review scores
| Source | Rating |
|---|---|
| AllMusic | 4/5 stars |
| Mojo | 4/5 stars |
| PopMatters | 7/10 |
| Uncut | 9/10 stars |

Matt Collar of AllMusic referred to it as "a spectral, cinematic album, evoking arid spaghetti western landscapes", noting its "loungey, brushed shuffle grooves and sparkling guitar riffs."

PopMatters observed, "Wareham's storytelling comes to life with sophisticated arrangements. Wareham mixes personal anecdotes about things he cares about with subtle political ramblings," rating the album seven.

In a four-star review for Mojo, Roy Wilkinson remarked, "There's less reverb this time, but it all sounds great, befitting a set of excellent songs that range from the Galaxie-ish New World Julie to the "parallel inlays" and "polymer pearl" of the madrigal-sweet 'We're Not Finished Yet', an ode to a guitar."

Peter Watts, writing for Uncut with a 9/10 rating, commented, "Gorgeous solo album from a songwriter determined to prove he's not yesterday's hero."

== Track listing ==
That's the Price of Loving Me track listing
| No. | Title | Length |
|---|---|---|
| 1. | "You Were the Ones I Had to Betray" | 3:01 |
| 2. | "Dear Betty Baby" | 3:50 |
| 3. | "Mystery Guest" | 3:21 |
| 4. | "New World Julie" | 3:30 |
| 5. | "We're Not Finished Yet" | 3:48 |
| 6. | "Bourgeois Manqué" | 5:51 |
| 7. | "Yesterday's Hero" | 3:05 |
| 8. | "That's the Price of Loving Me" | 3:02 |
| 9. | "Reich der Traume" | 3:19 |
| 10. | "The Cloud Is Coming" | 4:09 |
| Total length: | | 36:56 |
