= Dale Turner (songwriter) =

American songwriter

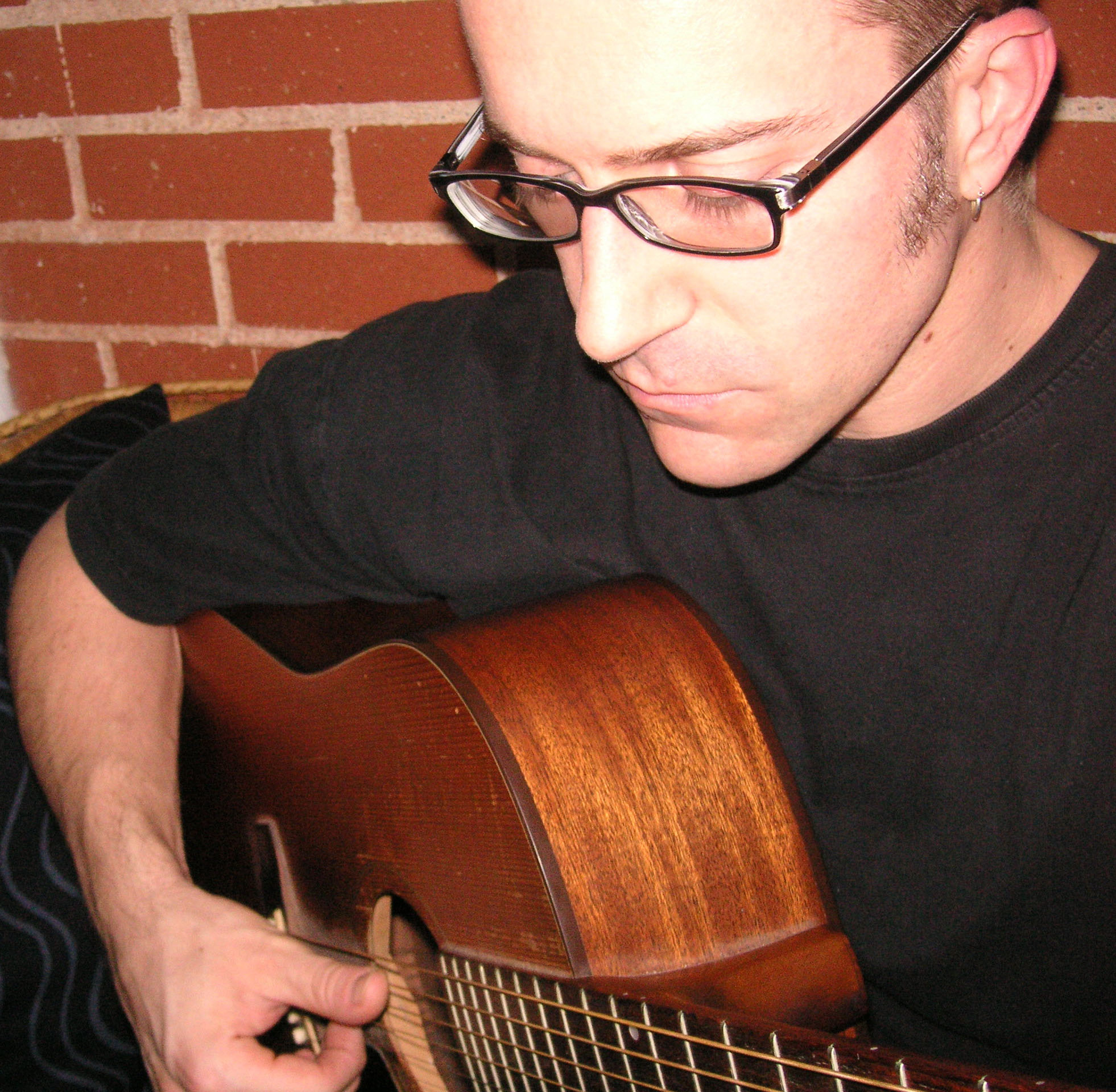
- Dale Turner in 2006

Background information
- Origin: Los Angeles, California
- Genres: Acoustic music Rock; Progressive rock
- Years active: 2004–present
- Label: Intimate Audio
- Members: Dale Turner (vocals, guitars, bass, drums, piano, mandolin, accordion)
- Website: http://www.intimateaudio.com

Dale Turner is an American singer-songwriter, rock musician, and multi-instrumentalist/record producer, noted for his sophisticated songcraft, quirky vocal arrangements, and adventurous guitar work. Queen-meets-Mr. Bungle-meets-Frank Zappa-like melodic rock, with somewhat psychedelic musical leanings.

Regarded as a musical "Renaissance man" and "mad scientist" for his versatility as a self-recordist in the studio environment, Turner's overall artistic vision has been likened to Jon Brion, Sufjan Stevens, Todd Rundgren, Jeff Buckley, and the Beach Boys' Brian Wilson. Turner is the lone musician featured on all of his albums.

== History ==
=== Awards and achievements ===
In November 2010, Dale Turner's Mannerisms Magnified CD made Guitar Player magazine's list of "Top Three Picks" by Matt Blackett, who praised the album for its "Smart pop tunes that are crammed with interesting guitar parts and tones," comparing it to "what the Beach Boys might do if they were on an acid trip that was on the verge of getting out of control. Yeah!"

On July 11, 2011, Dale Turner's Mannerisms Magnified album achieved No. 1 Top-Rated Album status on Amazon.com in four categories:

1. No.1 Top Rated in MP3 Albums > Rock (Singer-Songwriters)
2. No.1 Top Rated in MP3 Albums > Alternative Rock (Singer-Songwriters)
3. No.1 Top Rated in MP3 Albums > Alternative Rock (Indie & Lo-Fi)
4. No.1 Top Rated in MP3 Albums > Rock (Progressive)

A regular "acoustic guitar" content contributor to Guitar World magazine, and featured video performer, Turner was one of the first musicians/guitarists to be featured in Guitar World magazine's "Lick of the Day" App. for iPhone.

In 2006, Turner's guitar/vocal-only rendition of Queen's "Bohemian Rhapsody" was selected as one of the "Top Cover Song Recordings" at the Just Plain Folks Music Awards.

=== Radio ===
Dale Turner's's debut American radio broadcast was on "Appalachian Trail," Steve Sedberry's "Vaguely Folk Music" show on WUWG Radio 90.7 FM, broadcast August 24, 2004; Sedberry played Turner's cover versions of Queen's "Bohemian Rhapsody" and Harry Nilsson's "Coconut."

In addition to terrestrial radio, Turner's music also appears on Pandora Radio.

== Discography ==
=== LPs ===
- Interpretations (2004)
1. "Bohemian Rhapsody"
2. "God Only Knows"
3. "Blackbird"
4. "Sweet Baby James"
5. "Hallelujah"
6. "She's Always a Woman"
7. "Leader of the Band"
8. "Sister Golden Hair"
9. "Castles Made of Sand"
10. "Coconut"
- Mannerisms Magnified (2010)
1. "Brian on the Brain"
2. "Bad Seed"
3. "Sooner or Later You'll Hate Her"
4. "She-Hab"
5. "Hiding Place"
6. "Taken"
7. "Morality Rule"
8. "Five Things"
9. "Saboteur"
10. "Civil Lies"
11. "Exit Wound"
12. "Solace Song"
