= Benjamin Anderson (musician) =

American musician and songwriter

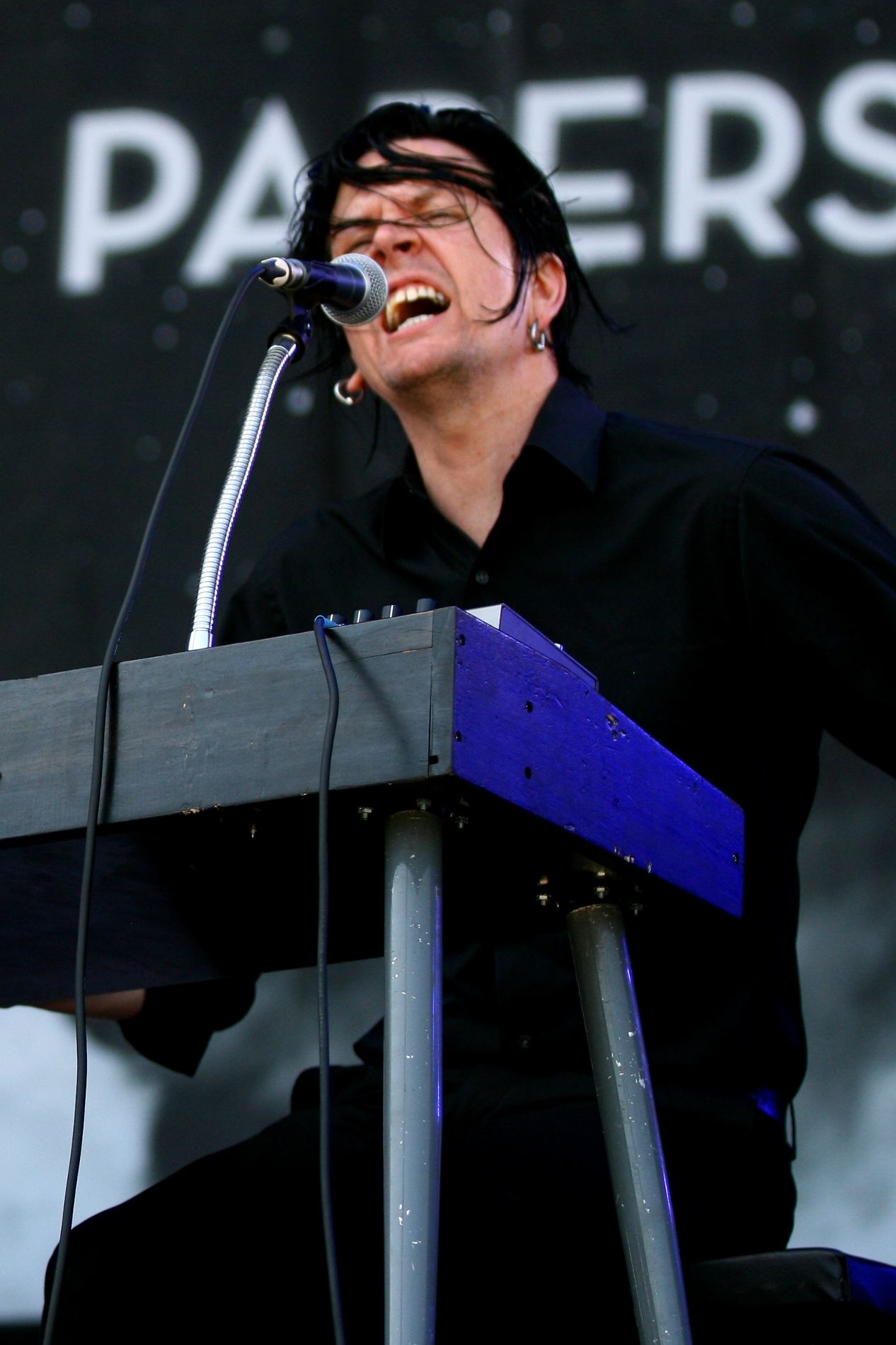
- Anderson in 2014

Background information
- Born: January 28, 1974 (age 52); Tucson, Arizona, US
- Genres: Rock; industrial; ambient; electronic
- Occupations: Singer; songwriter; musician
- Instruments: Vocals; guitar; accordion; piano; programming; keyboards; keyboard bass
- Years active: 1995–present
- Labels: The Boredom Killing Business; Loud & Proud Records

Benjamin Anderson (born January 28, 1974) is an American musician and songwriter. His musical styles range from hard rock and industrial to electronic and ambient music.

== History ==
Anderson was first introduced to music at an early age, singing and traveling in an all-boys choir. In high school he became inspired by artists such as The Cure, The Mission, and U2. This led him to pick up the guitar and later leave college, wandering to Denver, Colorado, where he recorded his first record as lead guitarist with the band Rorschach Test.

Rorschach Test later relocated to Seattle, where they were signed to the now defunct, Chicago label, Slipdisc Records (Mercury). They sustained a successful career during Seattle's lively music scene in the 1990s. They toured North America playing shows with the likes of Korn, Type O Negative, Genitorturers, Queensrÿche.

In 1999, Anderson left the band Rorschach Test to pursue a musical journey in ambient and electronic music. Many of his ambient records were written as part of his art installations which also contained themed paintings and video.

In 2012, Anderson lent his keyboard talent to the Seattle supergroup Walking Papers. The band was formed in 2012 by members Barrett Martin (Screaming Trees, Mad Season) and Jeff Angell (The Missionary Position). They later became a quartet when Anderson and bassist Duff McKagan became members. Their debut self-titled album was re-released August 6, 2013, on Loud & Proud records a division of Roadrunner Records.

== Discography ==
- Rorschach Test The Eleventh (1996)
- Rorschach Test Unclean (Slipdisc 1998)
- Benjamin Anderson "1" (1999) Ambient recording
- Benjamin Anderson "2" (1999) Ambient recording
- Benjamin Anderson "Double Joy Happiness" (1999) Ambient recording
- Benjamin Anderson "4" the nature of things (1999) Ambient recording
- Benjamin Anderson "Blue" (2000) Ambient recording-multimedia art show
- Benjamin Anderson "Out of Focus (in stereo)" (2001) Ambient/Electronic recording-multimedia art show
- Pamela Moore "Stories from a Blue Room" (2006)
- The Missionary Position "Diamonds in a Dead Sky" (2009)
- The Missionary Position "Consequences (Album)" (2012)
- Walking Papers "Walking Papers" (2013)
- Walking Papers "WP2" (2018)
- Walking Papers "The Light Below" (2021)
