= Walking Papers (band) =

American rock band

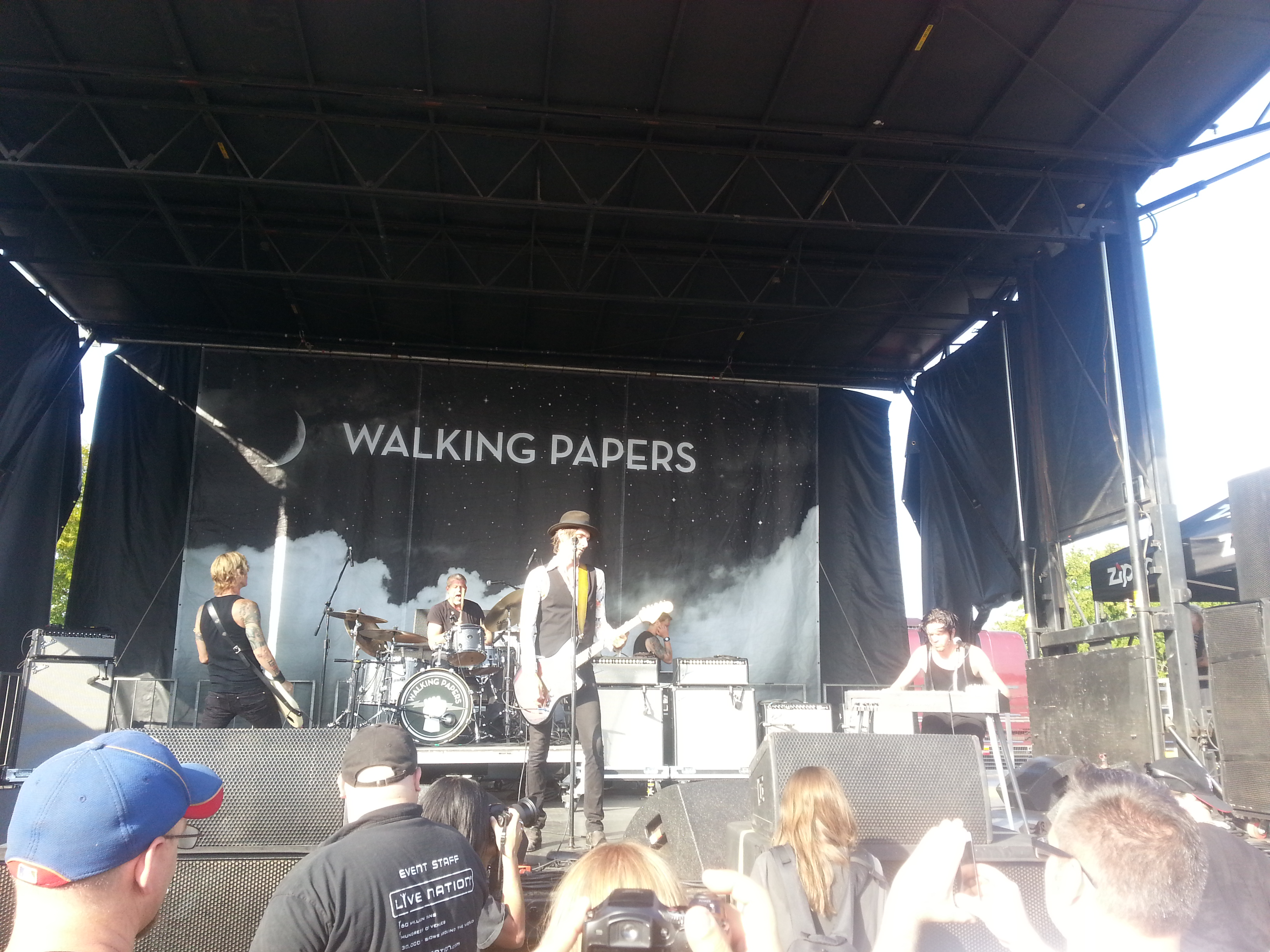
- Walking Papers in 2013

Background information
- Origin: Seattle, Washington, U.S.
- Genres: Rock, hard rock
- Years active: 2012–present
- Labels: The Boredom Killing Business, Sunyata, Loud & Proud, Carry On Records
- Members: Benjamin Anderson; Jeff Angell; Will Andrews; Konstantine Komarov; Gregor Lothian
- Past members: Barrett Martin; Duff McKagan
- Website: walkingpapers.us

Walking Papers is an American rock band from Seattle, Washington, formed in 2012. The band was formed by singer/guitarist Jeff Angell of The Missionary Position, and drummer Barrett Martin formerly of Screaming Trees. Guns N' Roses bassist Duff McKagan and keyboardist Benjamin Anderson (also of The Missionary Position) were invited to contribute to the band's first album and then were added as official members. Their self-titled debut album, produced by Angell and Martin and mixed by Jack Endino, was released on August 16, 2013 and featured contributions by Pearl Jam guitarist Mike McCready.

The band was then inactive for several years, and returned with the album WP2 on January 19, 2018. McKagan was unable to tour behind the album due to commitments with Guns N' Roses, and was replaced by Dan Spalding. Martin was also unable to tour and was replaced by Will Andrews from Ten Miles Wide. The band also added second guitarist Tristan Hart Pierce and saxophonist Gregor Lothian.

"What Did You Expect", a single from the band's third album The Light Below, was released on August 5, 2020, exclusively on Loudwire. The album was released on February 5, 2021, on Carry On Music.

In November 2021, Konstantine Komarov joined the band, playing bass, lap steel guitar, and samples. On November 6, 2021, the band performed their first show with this lineup at the Paramount Theater in Seattle, opening for Candlebox.

== Members ==
=== Current members ===
- Jeff Angell – lead vocals, guitar, piano
- Benjamin Anderson – keyboards, backing vocals
- Will Andrews – drums, percussion
- Konstantine Komarov – bass, guitar, lap steel, samples, backing vocals
- Gregor Lothian – saxophone

=== Original members ===
- Jeff Angell – lead vocals, guitar, piano
- Barrett Martin – drums
- Duff McKagan – bass
- Benjamin Anderson – keyboards, backing vocals

== Discography ==
Studio albums

- Walking Papers (2013)
- WP2 (2018)
- The Light Below (2021)
