= Back Numbers =

Studio album by Dean & Britta
- Released: February 27, 2007
- Recorded: 2007
- Genre: Indie pop
- Length: 44:09
- Label: Rounder Records
- Producer: Tony Visconti

Dean & Britta chronology
L'Avventura (2003)	Back Numbers (2007)

Professional ratings
Review scores
Source	Rating
AllMusic	4/5 stars
The A.V. Club	B+
Entertainment Weekly	B
Filter Magazine	86/100
Mojo Magazine	3.5/5 stars
NOW Magazine	5/5 stars
The Phoenix	3/4 stars
Pitchfork	6.7/10
PopMatters	8/10
Uncut	3/5 stars

Back Numbers is the second album by Dean & Britta, released in 2007.

== Track listing ==
All tracks by Dean & Britta except where noted.

1. "Singer Sing" – 4:15
2. "Words You Used to Say" – 4:21
3. "Wait for Me" – 3:40
4. "You Turned My Head Around" (Lee Hazlewood) – 3:34
5. "Teen Angel" (Donovan) – 3:21
6. "White Horses" (Carr, Nisbet) – 5:12
7. "Me & My Babies" – 3:29
8. "Say Goodnight" – 3:52
9. "Crystal Blue R.I.P." – 3:37
10. "The Sun Is Still Sunny" – 4:26
11. "Our Love Will Still Be There" (The Troggs) – 4:22

== Personnel ==
- Richard Agerbeek – design
- Matt Johnson – drums
- Michael Lavine – photography
- Emily Lazar – mastering
- Sean McCaul – vibraphone
- Britta Phillips – bass, keyboards, vocals, engineer
- Tony Visconti – producer, engineer, double bass, mixing, 12-string guitar
- Dean Wareham – guitar, vocals
- David Whitehead – management
