= Jeff Angell =

American musician (born 1973)

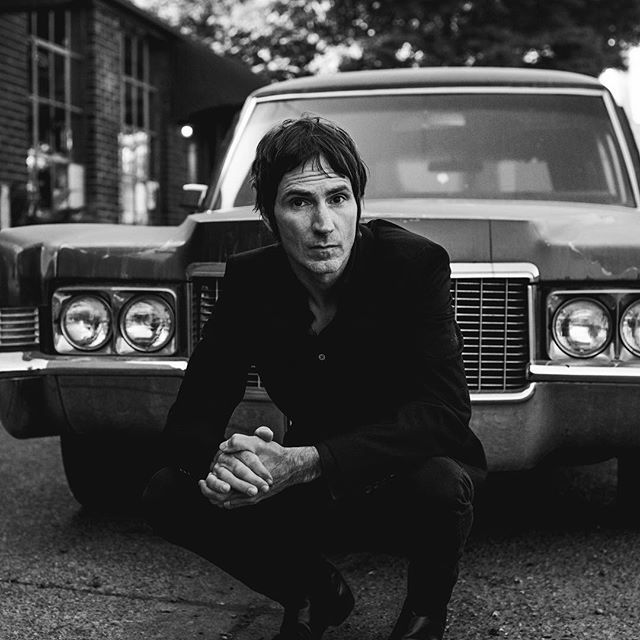

Background information
- Born: February 13, 1973 (age 53); Tacoma, Washington, United States
- Genres: Rock, alternative rock, blues rock
- Occupations: Musician, singer-songwriter
- Instruments: Guitar, vocals
- Labels: The Boredom Killing Business, The Control Group, Will Records, Carry On Records
- Website: https://www.walkingpapers.us/

Jeff Angell (born Jefferson Alan Angell, nicknamed "Junior" and "JdoubleA", on February 13, 1973, in Tacoma, Washington) is an American musician, best known for his songwriting, lead vocals and guitar playing in the Seattle, Washington bands Post Stardom Depression, The Missionary Position and Walking Papers.

== Recording career ==
- Sedated Souls – A local Tacoma band
- Prayer Factory – 1990s band with Jeff Angell, Darren Hocker, Danny Allen and Jeff Bernstein.
- Broadcast Amphetamine – Same members as Prayer Factory, songs such as "16 On Center", and "Summertime Radio"

=== Post Stardom Depression ===
Angell formed Post Stardom Depression with The Lemons bass player Brent Saunders, guitarist Kyong Kim and drummer Joshua Fant. On the strength of their demos and a homemade video for the song "Honeymoon Killer" Post Stardom Depression was signed to Will Records. They recorded Sexual Uno and supported its release by touring with Queens of the Stone Age, and the late Dee Dee Ramone. After fulfilling their contract with Will Records, Post Stardom Depression signed with Interscope Records. Shortly afterward, Interscope Records absorbed Geffen Records and A&M records with UMG's acquisition of Polygram. These complicated business matters led the band to sign with The Control Group in 2003. Here they recorded Ordinary Miracles with producer Jack Endino. The record became a local favorite on both KEXP and KNDD. Post Stardom Depression toured to South by Southwest and played shows with The Makers, The Black Halos, The Bell Rays, and Nebula in support of the release.

Post Stardom Depression then recorded Prime Time Looks a Lot Like Amateur Night with Producer Isaac Carpenter. The record was well received critically and received strong airplay locally. The band did a few short tours but the band members felt they weren't moving forward creatively. They disbanded in 2008 after two sell-out shows at Tacoma's Hell's Kitchen club.

=== The Missionary Position ===
Following the disbandment of Post Stardom Depression, Angell formed The Missionary Position with Benjamin Anderson, an old friend. When Jeff Angell and Benjamin Anderson began playing a Thursday night residency at a club in Seattle, Washington, they hadn't yet settled on a name. Those Thursday lounge nights were billed as The Missionary Position. Angell said "People thought that was the band's name, so, rather than fight it we embraced it" and the band became The Missionary Position.

In 2009 they recorded Diamonds in a Dead Sky and released it on the band's label "The Boredom Killing Business". The band supported the release by touring nationally.

The Song "Let's Start A Fire" was used for the Independent Film Channel's promotional campaign for its series Indie Screams.

In 2012, The Missionary Position released Consequences.

=== Walking Papers ===
In 2012 Angell recorded an album with Barrett Martin (Screaming Trees, Mad Season). The album also features songs with Duff McKagan (Guns N' Roses, Velvet Revolver, Loaded), and Pearl Jam's Mike McCready. The new line-up, called Walking Papers, released their eponymous album with Sunyata Records August 6, 2013.

== Other work ==
Angell wrote two songs, "Elekt" and "Rock and Roll Teenage Desperation", with the band Loudermilk for their DreamWorks release The Red Record.

== Discography ==
Title	Release	Band	Label
Sexual Uno	2000	Post Stardom Depression	Will Records
Ordinary Miracles	2003	Post Stardom Depression	The Control Group
Prime Time Looks A Lot Like Amateur Night	2005	Post Stardom Depression	The Control Group
Diamonds in a Dead Sky	2009	The Missionary Position	The Boredom Killing Business
Consequences	2012	The Missionary Position	The Boredom Killing Business
Walking Papers	2013	Walking Papers	Sunyata Records
Jeff Angell's Staticland	2016	Jeff Angell's Staticland	Silver Lining Music
WP2	2018	Walking Papers	Loud & Proud Records
I Belong to You	2019	Walking Papers	The Boredom Killing Business
The Light Below	2021	Walking Papers	Carry On Records
