= Kevin Hudson =

American film director

- Born: July 2, 1965 (age 61)
- Education: UCLA
- Occupations: Film director, visual effects artist
- Years active: 1990–present

Kevin Hudson (born July 2, 1965) is an American visual effects artist and film director.

== Biography ==
Kevin Hudson is an filmmaker and digital artist who, as of 2017, was part of the team at Walt Disney Animation Studios. His work can be found in Big Hero 6, Zootopia and Moana. Before transitioning into digital effects, Hudson worked in traditional special effects on Edward Scissorhands, Predator 2, and The Addams Family. His 2017 CGI-animated short, Weeds marks his debut as writer and director. It is also the first animated short film completed within the Filmmakers Co-op at Disney Feature Animation.

== Partial filmography ==
- Weeds (animated short) (2017)
- Rush (2013)
- Les Misérables (2012)
- The Dark Knight Rises (2012)
- John Carter (2012)
- I Am Legend (2007)
- Spider-Man 3 (2007)
- Superman Returns (2006)
- The Polar Express (2004)
- Stuart Little 2 (2002)
- Men in Black II (2002)
- The Chubbchubbs! (2002)
- Harry Potter and the Sorcerer's Stone (2001)
- Hollow Man (2000)
- Stuart Little (1999)
- Contact (1997)
- James and the Giant Peach (1996)
- Congo (1995)
- Star Trek VI: The Undiscovered Country (1991)
- The Addams Family (1991)
- Edward Scissorhands (1990)
- Predator 2 (1990)
- Darkman (1990)
