= Luna (1990s American band) =

American rock band

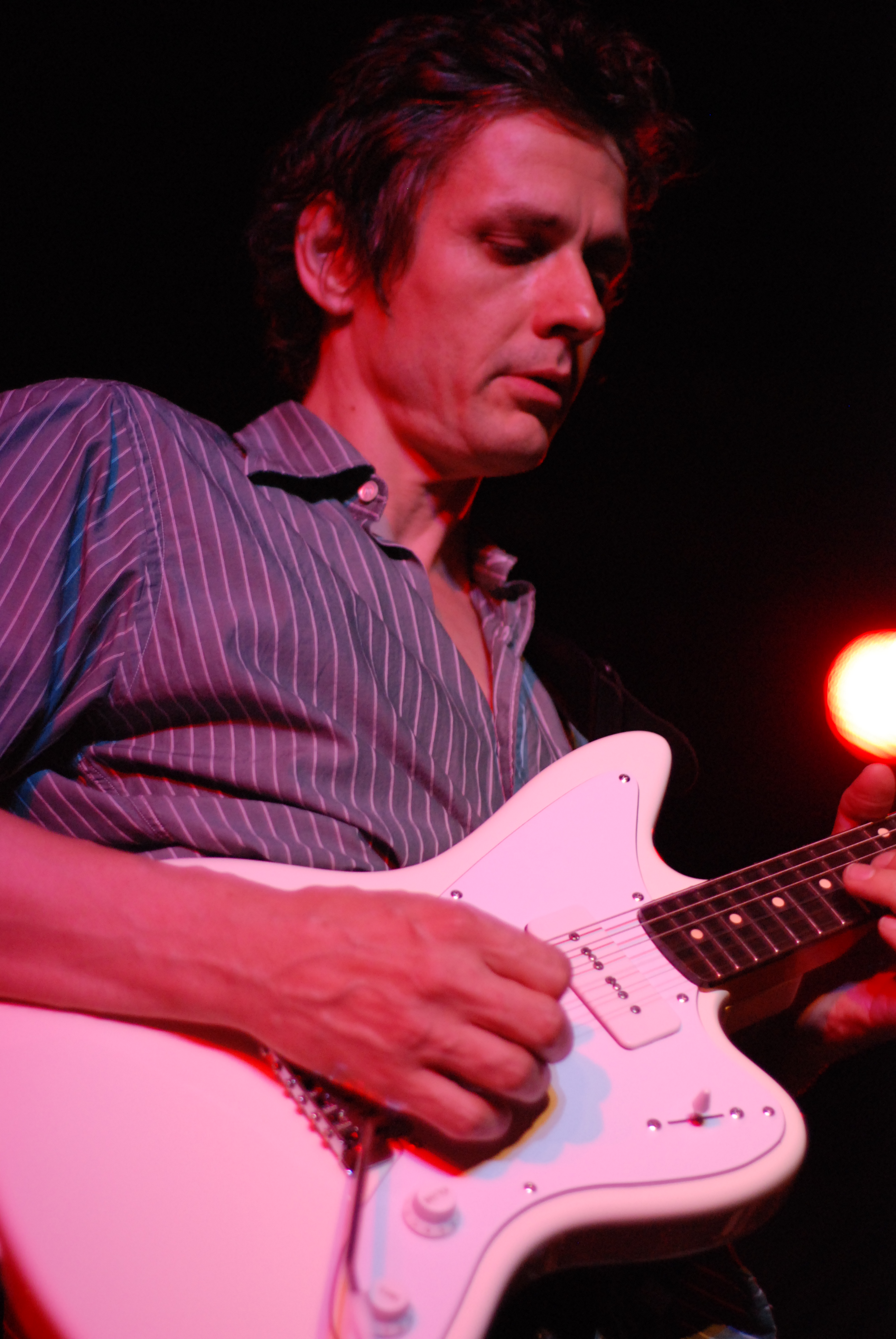
- Wareham of Luna, 2007

Background information
- Origin: New York City, New York, U.S.
- Genres: Indie pop, indie rock, dream pop
- Years active: 1991–2005, 2015–present
- Labels: No.6, Beggars Banquet, Elektra, Jericho, Jetset, Arena Rock Recording Co.
- Spinoff of: Galaxie 500
- Members: Dean Wareham; Sean Eden; Britta Phillips; Lee Wall
- Past members: Justin Harwood; Stanley Demeski; Byron Guthrie; Matt Quigley
- Website: lunamusic.com

Luna is an American rock band formed in 1991 by singer and guitarist Dean Wareham after the breakup of Galaxie 500. Described by Rolling Stone as "the best band you’ve never heard of," Luna combine intricate guitar work, traditional rock rhythms, and poetic lyrics.

The earliest edition of the band also included drummer Stanley Demeski and bassist Justin Harwood (Demeski formerly of The Feelies and Harwood formerly of New Zealand band The Chills). The original line-up was expanded with the addition of guitarist Sean Eden for their second album, 1994's Bewitched. Lee Wall replaced Demeski on drums in time for 1997's Pup Tent and Britta Phillips of Ultra Baby Fat and The Belltower (also known as the singing voice of animated character Jem) joined when bassist Justin Harwood departed in 2000. Phillips and Wareham became romantically involved and eventually married in 2007.

== History ==
In 1991, after the end of Galaxie 500's US tour supporting the Cocteau Twins, Dean Wareham told his bandmates Damon Krukowski and Naomi Yang that he was quitting the band. Wareham then signed a demo deal with Elektra Records and recorded a number of tracks with Mercury Rev drummer Jimmy Chambers. Some of these recordings were later released on the "Anesthesia" single on No.6 Records in the US and Mint Tea in the UK under the name "Dean Wareham." The same year, Krukowski and Yang released an album as Pierre Etiole, later renaming their new project Damon & Naomi.

Elektra's VP of A&R, Terry Tolkin, was impressed and Wareham signed a deal with Elektra, and started pulling together a band. He first contacted Justin Harwood, whom he had met while Harwood was playing with The Chills, and they recruited drummer Byron Guthrie, formerly from Ultra Vivid Scene. The trio recorded demos (produced by Dave Fridmann) and played a series of live dates with Mercury Rev guitarist Grasshopper. Guthrie was replaced by former Feelies drummer Stanley Demeski, and this line-up recorded the first album, Lunapark, produced by Fred Maher and released by Elektra under the name Luna² to avoid confusion with a new-age musician known as "Luna". (Later an accord was reached which allowed the band to use the name Luna.)

Shortly after the release of Lunapark, the band placed an advertisement in the Village Voice for a guitarist, and Canadian former drama student Sean Eden was recruited. The new four-piece recorded a number of cover versions that would become the Slide EP, and then toured the US. In mid-1993 the band supported the reformed Velvet Underground on their European tour, after which they recorded their second album Bewitched in New York City, co-produced by the band with Victor Van Vugt. Velvet Underground guitarist Sterling Morrison played guitar on two tracks. The album was released in 1994.

In 1995, the band went into Sorcerer Sound studio in New York City with producer Pat McCarthy and engineer Mario Salvati to record their third album Penthouse. The album featured Television guitarist Tom Verlaine on the tracks "Moon Palace" and "23 Minutes in Brussels." The album was released in August 1995 to critical acclaim, with Rolling Stone declaring it one of the essential albums of the 1990s. The album featured a cover of Serge Gainsbourg's "Bonnie and Clyde" as a hidden track; the song featured Lætitia Sadier of Stereolab duetting with Dean Wareham. "Bonnie and Clyde" was released as a single in the UK and was named Melody Maker single of the week. Pup Tent followed in 1997.

In 1999, the band recorded The Days of Our Nights for Elektra, but the label declined the album as "not commercially viable" and dropped the band. The record was ultimately released on Jericho Records in the US. Prior to the album's release, Justin Harwood left the band, and was replaced by Britta Phillips. Phillips and Wareham began a romantic affair, leading to Wareham's divorce; the new couple eventually married.

After releasing Luna Live (2001), Romantica (2002) and Rendezvous (2004) with their new line-up, Luna announced their final tour (at the time), disbanding after a show at the Bowery Ballroom on February 27, 2005.

Dean Wareham and Britta Phillips continued on as the duo Dean & Britta, initially formed in 2003.

In 2012, Sean Eden joined a Dean & Britta performance at the Shine A Light Festival in Brooklyn, performing a short set of Luna tunes in a one-off reunion performance.

In 2014, Dean Wareham announced via Twitter that Luna would reunite for a tour of Spain in 2015, to be followed by US dates.

In 2017, Luna announced two new releases, a Luna covers LP, A Sentimental Education, and a 6-song original instrumental EP, A Place Of Greater Safety, with a tour of Spain in October and a North American tour in November 2017. Since then, Luna has been touring around the United States and Europe.

== Members ==
=== Official members ===
- Dean Wareham – vocals, guitar (1991–present)
- Sean Eden – guitar (1992–2005, 2012, 2014–present)
- Britta Phillips – bass, vocals (2000–2005, 2014–present)
- Lee Wall – drums (1997–2005, 2014–present)

=== Past members ===
- Justin Harwood – bass (1991–1999)
- Stanley Demeski – drums (1991–1997)
- Byron Guthrie – drums (1991)
- Matt Quigley

=== Touring/guest musicians ===
- Jimy Chambers – drums (early demos)
- Grasshopper – guitar (live only)
- Sterling Morrison – guest guitar (on *Bewitched*)
- Tom Verlaine – guest guitar (on *Penthouse*)

== Discography ==
=== Studio albums ===
- Lunapark (1992)
- Bewitched (1994)
- Penthouse (1995)
- Pup Tent (1997)
- The Days of Our Nights (1999)
- Romantica (2002)
- Rendezvous (2004)
- A Sentimental Education (2017)

=== Live albums ===
- Luna Live (2001)
- Live Bewitched (2022)
- Live Penthouse (2022)
- Live Rendezvous (2022)

=== Compilation albums ===
- Best of Luna (2006)
- Lunafied (2006) – available as download and Best of Luna bonus disc

=== EPs ===
- Slide (1993)
- EP (1996)
- EP (1997) (Australian release consisting of mostly live songs from Pup Tent)
- Close Cover Before Striking (2002)
- A Place of Greater Safety (2017)
- Postscripts (2019)

=== Singles ===
- "Smile (LP version)/Slash Your Tires (LP version)/Rollercoaster/Hey Sister (demo)" (1993)
- "This Time Around"
- "Chinatown (radio edit)/Chinatown (album version)" (1995)
- "Hedgehog/23 Minutes in Brussels/No Regrets/Happy New Year" (1995)
- "Bonnie & Clyde (Bonnie Parker version)/Chinatown/Thank You for Sending Me an Angel/Bonnie & Clyde (Clyde Barrow version)" (1995)
- "Bonnie & Clyde/Chinatown" (1995)
- "Outdoor Miner/Roll in the Sand" (1996)
- "Season of the Witch" from I Shot Andy Warhol Soundtrack (1996)
- "Season of the Witch/Indian Summer/Lost in Space/23 Minutes in Brussels" (1996)
- "Bobby Peru/Audio Biography" (1997)
- "IHOP/Fuzzy Wuzzy/Words without Wrinkles" (1997)
- "Bobby Peru/In the Flesh/Beggar's Bliss (demo)/Bob le Flambeur" (1997)
- "Hedgehog/23 Minutes in Brussels" (1997)
- "Beautiful View/Bobby Peru (U.S. radio edit)/California (live)" (1998)
- "Superfreaky Memories/Neon Lights/The Bad Vibe Merchant" (1999)
- "Lovedust/Black Postcards/Only Women Bleed" (2002)
- "Speedbumps/Astronaut/Eyes in My Smoke" (2004)

=== DVDs ===
- Tell Me Do You Miss Me (2006)

=== Other releases ===
- Dean Wareham - Anesthesia containing songs "Anesthesia"/"I Can't Wait"/"Tomato Poodle"
- "Dream Baby Dream" from the guest album Invitation to a Suicide (1997)
- Britta Phillips & Dean Wareham - L'Avventura (2003)
- Britta Phillips & Dean Wareham - Back Numbers (2007)
- Dean & Britta - 13 Most Beautiful: Songs for Andy Warhol's Screen (2010)
- Dean & Britta - Sonic Souvenirs (EP) (2003)
- Dean Wareham - Emancipated Hearts (2013)
- Dean Wareham - Dean Wareham (2014)

=== Soundtracks ===
- Irma Vep (1996)
- I Shot Andy Warhol (1996)
- Mr. Jealousy (1997)
- Thursday (1998)
- Kill Me Later (2001)
- Sideways (2004)
