= Dean Wareham =

American musician and actor (born 1963)

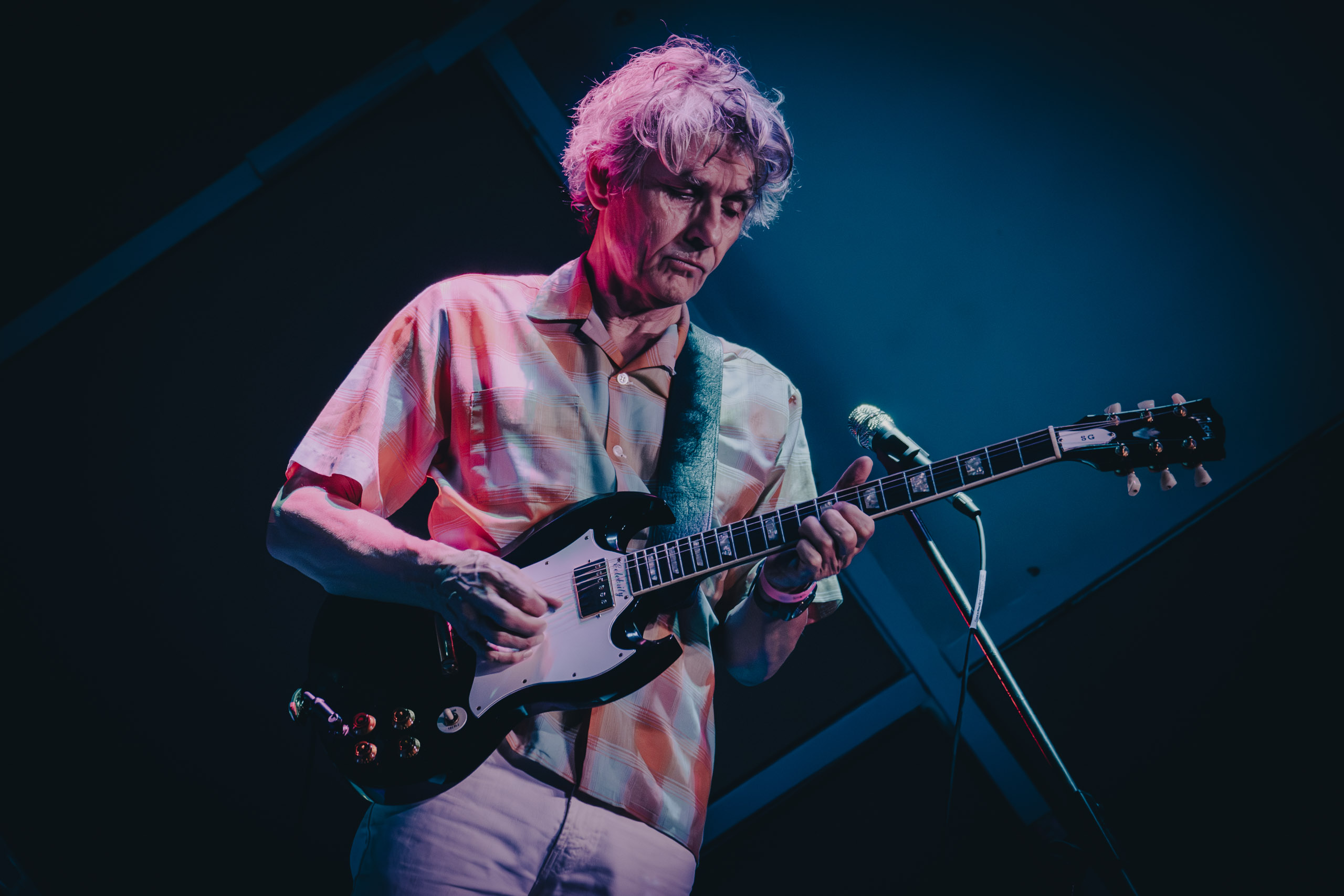
- Wareham in 2026

Background information
- Born: 1 August 1963 (age 63); Wellington, New Zealand
- Origin: New York City, U.S.
- Genres: Dream pop; slowcore; indie rock; indie pop
- Occupations: Musician; songwriter
- Instruments: Vocals; guitar
- Years active: 1987–present
- Label: Various
- Member of: Luna; Dean & Britta
- Formerly of: Galaxie 500
- Spouse: Britta Phillips (m. 2006)
- Website: deanwareham.com

Dean Wareham (born 1 August 1963) is an American musician and actor who co-founded the band Galaxie 500 in 1987. He departed from Galaxie 500 in April 1991 and went on to establish the band Luna. Following Luna's dissolution in 2005, Wareham has collaborated on albums with fellow Luna band member (and wife) Britta Phillips, forming the duo known as Dean & Britta. They have also ventured into film composition, notably contributing to the soundtracks of Noah Baumbach's films The Squid and the Whale (2005) and Mistress America. In 2014, Wareham released a self-titled album and in 2015, he reformed Luna.

== Early life ==
Born in Wellington, New Zealand, Wareham's family relocated to Sydney, Australia, before eventually settling in New York City in 1977. Wareham attended the Dalton School in New York and Harvard University, where he earned a B.A. in social studies. He has three siblings, one of whom is Louise Wareham, a novelist.

== Career ==
=== Galaxie 500 ===
Guitarist Wareham, drummer Damon Krukowski and bassist Naomi Yang began playing together as Galaxie 500 in 1987, after their time as students at Harvard University. The band's name comes from a Ford car of the 1960s, the Ford Galaxie 500. Galaxie 500's records were released in the US and UK on the independent Rough Trade label and went out of print upon Rough Trade's demise. Galaxie 500's entire catalog, along with a box set including singles, EPs and rarities was reissued during the 1990s by Rykodisc.

Galaxie 500 leveraged fairly minimal instrumental technique with intense atmospherics provided by producer Mark Kramer, and their distinctive sound bore an influence beyond the small audience for their independently released albums. The sound and the increasingly loyal audience grew with each release until Wareham quit the band in 1991. In 2011, Wareham embarked on his Dean Wareham Plays Galaxie 500 tour, minus Krukowski and Yang.

=== Luna ===
Luna was a dream pop band Wareham formed in 1991 after the breakup of Galaxie 500, with Stanley Demeski and Justin Harwood (Demeski also in The Feelies and Harwood formerly of New Zealand band The Chills).

The original lineup was expanded with the addition of guitarist Sean Eden for their second album, 1994's Bewitched. Lee Wall replaced Demeski on drums in time for 1997's Pup Tent, and Britta Phillips of Belltower (also known as the singing voice of animated character Jem) joined when bassist Justin Harwood departed in 2000. Phillips and Wareham eventually became romantically involved and married. They now release records under the moniker "Dean & Britta".

In 1992, Wareham signed a demo deal with Elektra Records' A&R VP Terry Tolkin and recorded a number of tracks with Mercury Rev drummer Jimy Chambers. Some of these recordings were later released on the "Anesthesia" single on Tolkin's No.6 Records in the US and Mint Tea in the UK under the name Dean Wareham.

After signing to Elektra, Wareham started pulling together a band. He first contacted Justin Harwood, whom Dean had met while Justin was playing with The Chills and drummer Byron Guthrie. The trio recorded some more demos (produced by Dave Fridmann) and played a couple of live dates augmented by Mercury Rev guitarist Grasshopper (Sean Mackowiak). Guthrie was then replaced by former Feelies drummer Stanley Demeski and this lineup recorded the first album Lunapark, produced by Fred Maher and released by Elektra under the name Luna^{2} to avoid confusion with a new-age musician who was already using the name Luna (later an agreement was reached which allowed the band to use the name Luna).

In the summer of 1993 the band was the supporting act for the reformed Velvet Underground on their European tour after which they set about recording their second album. Bewitched was recorded in New York City and co-produced by the band with Victor Van-Vugt. Velvet Underground guitarist Sterling Morrison played guitar on two tracks. The album was released in 1994.

Luna's third album, Penthouse (1995), was named one of the essential of the 1990s by Rolling Stone magazine. Penthouse was co-produced by Mario Salvati and Pat McCarthy in New York, and features guests Tom Verlaine (Television) and Laetitia Sadier (Stereolab). While remaining on Elektra Records in the U.S., the band was signed to Beggar's Banquet for the rest of the world.

In 1997, Lee Wall replaced Stanley Demeski on drums, and the band recorded Pup Tent, their fourth album for Elektra, produced by Pat McCarthy. In 1998, Luna recorded their fifth album, The Days of Our Nights, produced by Paul Kimble (Grant Lee Buffalo). The album was released in the U.S. on Jericho Records and on Beggar's Banquet internationally.

In December 1999, Harwood retired to New Zealand, and was replaced on bass by Britta Phillips. The band released Luna Live! in 2000 on the Arena Rock label, and then signed to Jetset Records, for whom they recorded two more studio albums, Romantica (2002), co-produced by Gene Holder (DB's) and Dave Fridmann (Mercury Rev), and Rendezvous (2004), produced by Bryce Goggin. The band announced plans to break up in 2004, and played a final concert at the Bowery Ballroom in New York City on 28 February 2005. However, in 2015 the band returned, toured the world and released new material in 2017 - the LP A Sentimental Education and the EP A Place of Greater Safety.

=== Dean & Britta ===
Dean & Britta is a musical duo consisting of Wareham and Britta Phillips, former Luna bassist. After Luna broke up in 2005, the pair spent the following year working on film scores, including one for Noah Baumbach's movie The Squid and the Whale, and promoting the documentary film of Luna's farewell tour Tell Me Do You Miss Me. They were married during the recording of their album Back Numbers, produced by Tony Visconti, and simplified their name to "Dean & Britta". Back Numbers was released on Rounder Records in February 2007, followed by a limited edition EP, "Words You Used To Say".

== Solo work ==
Wareham released the EP, Emancipated Hearts, under his own name in late 2013, which was followed by the self-titled album Dean Wareham in March 2014. October 2018 saw the release of Dean Wareham Vs. Cheval Sombre - a collection of western-themed songs featuring Wareham and singer-songwriter Cheval Sombre. In 2021, Wareham released I Have Nothing to Say to the Mayor of L.A., the first full album of new songs since his eponymous 2014 solo album. In 2024, as Dean & Britta & Sonic Boom, he recorded an album of holiday and Christmas songs, mixed by Sonic Boom, and released on Carpark Records.

In 2024 Wareham reunited with producer Kramer, making their first album together since Galaxie 500 days. The new album, That's the Price of Loving Me was released in 2025 by Carpark Records. It features Britta Phillips on bass, Gabe Noel on cello, Kramer on keyboards, and Roger Brogan and Anthony LaMarca on drums.

=== Book ===
Wareham has written a memoir about his years in indie rock. The book recounts his experiences in music and otherwise, from high school in New York City in the 1970s through his years in Galaxie 500 and Luna and his divorce. Titled Black Postcards, it was published by Penguin Press in March, 2008.

== Artistry ==
On songwriting, Wareham stated in a 2025 interview with Premier Guitar, "You want there to be moments [in a song] where something unexpected hits you. They’ve done studies on this. What is it in a song that makes people cry? What is it that moves you? It’s something unexpected."

== Discography ==
Studio albums

- Emancipated Hearts (2013)
- Dean Wareham (2014)
- Mistress America (2015)
- Dean Wareham vs. Cheval Sombre (2018)
- I Have Nothing to Say to the Mayor of L.A. (2021)
- That's the Price of Loving Me (2025)
