= Justin Harwood =

New Zealand bass guitarist

- Born: Taradale, New Zealand
- Other name: J Harwood
- Occupations: Musician; writer; director
- Years active: 1980s–present
- Known for: The Chills, Luna, Tuatara

Justin Harwood is a New Zealand bass guitarist, notable for his work with several indie rock bands of the 1980s and 1990s, The Chills, Luna, and Tuatara. He worked alongside New Zealand's Martin Phillipps (The Chills), Dean Wareham (Galaxie 500, Luna), and Peter Buck (R.E.M., Tuatara).

== Early life ==
Harwood was born in Taradale, Napier (North Island).

== Career ==
Harwood was a member of the Chills from 1986 to 1990, during which time they had their biggest commercial success with the singles I Love My Leather Jacket (a New Zealand top 5 single) and Heavenly Pop Hit, which went to number 17 on the U.S. modern rock chart). During this time, The Chills also performed before their largest audience ever. They drew 60,000 people at the 1987 Glastonbury Festival.

After leaving The Chills, Harwood moved to New York City, where he became a founding member of Luna. In 1996, Harwood joined forces with several noted members of indie rock groups to form a side-project, the semi-experimental band Tuatara - named, at Harwood's suggestion, after a type of reptile from his native New Zealand.

== Filmography ==
- 2013-2016: High Road (TV series short) – Writer, Director, Editor, Composer
- 2017: Wilde Ride (TV series) – Writer, Director
- 2019: The Chills: The Triumph and Tragedy of Martin Phillipps (Documentary) – self

== Works and publications ==
- Harwood, Justin (2012). Queen Bitch: A Hardboiled Novella. CreateSpace Independent Publishing Platform. ISBN 978-1-481-16125-1.
- Harwood, Justin (2012). The Blender: A Harry Hyde Story (Volume 1). CreateSpace Independent Publishing Platform. ISBN 978-1-481-22149-8.
