= Uncollected Noise New York '88–'90 =

2024 archival album by Galaxie 500

Compilation album by Galaxie 500
- Released: September 20, 2024
- Recorded: 1988–1990
- Studio: Noise New York
- Label: Silver Current
- Producer: Kramer

Galaxie 500 chronology
Peel Sessions (2005)	Uncollected Noise New York '88–'90 (2024)

Uncollected Noise New York '88–'90 is a double album of archival material of the band Galaxie 500, released on September 20, 2024, through Silver Current Records. It was released as 2×LP, 2×CD and 2×tape and digital.

== Track listing ==
All songs written by Galaxie 500 (Dean Wareham, Damon Krukowski, and Naomi Yang) except where noted):

Uncollected Noise New York '88–'90 track listing
#	Title	Writer(s)	Release notes	Length
2/88 Session
1	"Shout You Down"		previously unreleased	2:50
2	"See Through Glasses"		previously unreleased	4:03
3	"On the Floor" (Noise NY version)		previously unreleased	3:11
4	"Can't Believe It's Me"		Ryko box set bonus CD, otherwise unreleased	3:59
5	"Oblivious"		Ryko box set bonus CD, Chemical Imbalance fanzine 7"	3:23
6	"King of Spain"		Today CD bonus track, Aurora Records 7" B-side	4:33
7/88 session
7	"Jerome"		Ryko box set bonus CD, otherwise unreleased	2:48
8	"Song in 3"		Ryko box set bonus CD, otherwise unreleased	3:28
9	"Crazy"		Ryko box set bonus CD, European Today CD bonus track	1:56
2/89 session
10	"I Wanna Live"		previously unreleased	2:33
11	"I Will Walk"		previously unreleased	2:08
12	"Cold Night"		On Fire CD bonus track, Rough Trade Blue Thunder EP	2:36
13	"Ceremony"	Ian Curtis, Peter Hook, Stephen Morris, Bernard Sumner	On Fire CD bonus track; Rough Trade Blue Thunder EP	5:58
8/89 session
14	"Never Get to Heaven"		previously unreleased	2:15
15	"Maracas Song"		Ryko box set bonus CD; otherwise unreleased	3:55
16	"Victory Garden"	Steve Cunningham, Mayo Thompson	On Fire CD bonus track; Rough Trade Blue Thunder EP	2:52
17	"Blue Thunder" (w/sax)		Ryko box set bonus CD; Rough Trade EP	3:49
6/90
18	"Cheese and Onions"	Neil Innes, John Lennon, Paul McCartney	Ryko box set bonus CD; Rutles Highway Revisited Shimmy Disc LP	3:07
19	"Fourth of July"		video mix	4:40
20	"Cactus"		previously unreleased	3:53
21	"Moonshot"	Buffy Sainte-Marie	previously unreleased	3:44
22	"Them"		Ryko box set bonus CD, otherwise unreleased	3:44
23	"Final Day"	Stuart Moxham	Ryko box set bonus CD, otherwise unreleased	2:56
24	"Here She Comes Now"	Lou Reed, John Cale, Sterling Morrison, Moe Tucker	This Is Our Music CD bonus track; Rough Trade "Fourth of July" 12" B-side	5:58

== Personnel ==
- Dean Wareham – guitar, vocals
- Damon Krukowski – drums, percussion, vocals
- Naomi Yang – bass, vocals
- Ralph Carney – tenor sax on "Blue Thunder"
- Kramer – producer and engineer
- Alan Douches – mastering

== Charts ==
Chart performance for Uncollected Noise New York '88–'90
Chart (2024)	Peak position
UK Album Downloads (OCC)	87
