= Stardancer =

Studio album by Tom Rapp
- Released: 1972
- Recorded: August 29 – September 12, 1972
- Studio: Quadrafonic Sound (Nashville, Tennessee); Woodland (Nashville, Tennessee)
- Genre: Folk rock, art rock, psychedelic rock
- Length: 36:32
- Label: Blue Thumb Records BTS-44; Lemon cdlem128
- Producer: Peter H. Edmiston

Tom Rapp chronology
Familiar Songs (1972)	Stardancer (1972)	Sunforest (1973)

Professional ratings
Review scores
Source	Rating
Allmusic	2.5/5 stars
Variety	(favourable)

Stardancer was the second solo album credited to American singer-songwriter Tom Rapp, the leader of folk-rock group Pearls Before Swine, and his first for Blue Thumb Records. It was recorded and first released in 1972.

== Background ==
After two Pearls Before Swine albums for ESP-Disk, and five albums for Reprise Records which increasingly acknowledged his solo status, Rapp signed for Blue Thumb as a singer-songwriter, ironically around the same time as Pearls Before Swine had at last begun to perform as a regular touring group. The group, including Art Ellis, Harry Orlove and Bill Rollins, appeared on three of the tracks on Stardancer, but on most of the songs Rapp was supported - as he had been two years earlier on The Use of Ashes - by Nashville session musicians, led by Charlie McCoy and supported by Steve McCord (who had previously been a member of one of Lou Reed's first bands, The All Night Workers).

Rapp stated that Stardancer was the first album since the first Pearls album One Nation Underground over which he had full control. Although Allmusic gives Stardancer a mediocre rating, this is not supported by other critics, nor by Rapp himself, who has rated the album as one of his finest. The fierce anti-war song "Fourth Day of July", with its references to "the broken children of Vietnam", was widely played in "underground" circles of the time. The lighthearted "Summer of '55" contains some of Rapp's cleverest aphorisms, such as "When the day breaks / the pieces fall on you". Two of his other songs, "Stardancer" and "For The Dead In Space", reflect on themes of loss against a background of space travel and can be seen as reworkings of Pearls Before Swine's earlier "Rocket Man". Several of the arrangements hark back to the psychedelic style of his earliest albums, such as Balaklava, with use of bell overtones and phasing.

Like most of the Pearls Before Swine albums, the sleeve design used classic art works, in this case the painting "Descent of the Rebel Angels" by Pieter Brueghel the Elder on the front sleeve, and a William Morris background design on the reverse.

Stardancer was not reissued on CD until June 2009, when it was released on the Lemon label, a subsidiary of Cherry Red Records in the UK. The rights had been held by Universal Music, who administered the properties of the former Blue Thumb label.

== Track listing ==
All tracks composed by Tom Rapp; except where indicated

1. "Fourth Day of July" - 4:55
2. "For The Dead in Space" - 4:05
3. "The Baptist" - 5:10
4. "Summer of '55" - 2:13
5. "Tiny Song" - 2:33
6. "Stardancer" - 5:42
7. "Marshall" - 2:15
8. "Why Should I Care" - 2:54 (John Osborne, John Addison)
9. "Touch Tripping" - 4:55
10. "Les Ans" - 1:50

== Personnel ==
- Tom Rapp - Vocals, Guitar
- Charlie McCoy - Guitar, Dobro, Organ, Banjo, Harmonica, Toy Piano, Session Leader
- Mike Leech - Bass Guitar, String Arrangements
- Steve McCord - Guitar, Musical Advisor
- David Briggs - Piano
- Bobby Wood - Piano
- Jim Isbell - Drums, Percussion
- Buddy Spicher - Fiddle, Electric Viola, Electric Violin
- Weldon Myrick - Steel Guitar
- Florence Warner - Vocals
- Reggie Young - Electric Guitar
- Jim Colvard - Electric Guitar
- Pearls Before Swine (on tracks 3, 6, 7):
  - Art Ellis - Flute, Wind Chimes, Congas, Vocals
  - Harry Orlove - Guitar, Mandolin, Vocals
  - Bill Rollins - Cello, Vocals
- String quartet (on track 10):
  - Brenton Banks - Violin
  - Gary Van Osdale - Viola
  - Sheldon Kurland - Violin
  - Byron Bach - Cello

== Other credits ==
- Recorded at Quadrafonic Sound and Woodland Sound Studios, Nashville, August 29 - September 12, 1972
- Produced by Peter H. Edmiston
- Engineers : Rex Collier, Gene Eichelberger
