= Listen, the Snow Is Falling =

1971 single by Yoko Ono

- UK sleeve

Single by Yoko Ono and the Plastic Ono Band
- A-side: "Happy Xmas (War Is Over)" (John and Yoko and the Plastic Ono Band with the Harlem Community Choir)
- Released: 1 December 1971
- Recorded: 30 October 1971
- Studio: Record Plant East, New York City
- Genre: Pop
- Length: 3:10
- Label: Apple
- Songwriter: Yoko Ono
- Producers: Phil Spector; John Lennon; Yoko Ono

"Listen, the Snow Is Falling" is a song written by Yoko Ono and recorded by Ono and the Plastic Ono Band that was first released as the B-side of John Lennon's 1971 single "Happy Xmas (War Is Over)". A version of the song was later released on a reissue of Lennon and Ono's Wedding Album and was covered by Galaxie 500.

The song was released on digital and streaming services in 2021 via Secretly Canadian.

== Origin ==
Ono had written and recorded an early version of "Listen, the Snow Is Falling" in November 1968 under the title "Snow Is Falling All the Time" as part of the "Song for John" medley during the sessions for Unfinished Music No. 2: Life with the Lions. "Song for John" was not released on the original version of Life with the Lions but was eventually released as a bonus track on a CD reissue of the album.

Ono stated of the song:

The first pop song—if you can say pop song—I ever wrote was "Listen, the Snow Is Falling." I did that before [Lennon and I] got together. Then, when we got together, I made it into a real pop song. When you see the original, you couldn't pick out why it was a pop song.

== Recording ==
"Listen, the Snow Is Falling" was recorded on October 30, 1971, during the sessions for "Happy Xmas (Was Is Over)." Ono sings the lead vocals, Lennon and Hugh McCracken play guitar, Klaus Voormann plays bass, Nicky Hopkins plays organ and chimes, and Jim Keltner plays drums and sleigh bells. The recording sessions were tense. There was difficulty settling on a tempo, with the band originally playing it fast and as a rock song, which was not how Ono wanted it. Ono also disagreed with some of the riffs that McCracken and Voormann were developing. And she criticized some of Hopkins' playing, wanting him to play as if "snow is melting from your fingertips, not that banging." But the ultimate recording turned out serene, despite the studio tension.

== Music and lyrics ==
The song begins with sounds of the wind blowing and people walking through the snow. According to music critic Johnny Rogan, these came from sound effects recordings entitled "Strong Wind" and "Feet in the Snow." The lyrics speak of snow falling in actual places, such as Trafalgar Square, the Empire State Building, Tokyo, Paris and Dallas, as well as "between your head and my mind," a metaphor for the love between Ono and Lennon. Some of the instruments play a descending melody, which music lecturers Ben Urish and Ken Bielen regard as invoking the sound of falling snow, while a guitar plays a gentle ascending riff. Late in the song, Urish and Bielen hear a few measures that they feel sound similar to the Beatles' "Sun King," written by Lennon. The song ends with a return to the sounds of wind and people walking in the snow, and Ono finally whispers to "listen!"

Music journalist Peter Doggett describes Ono's vocals as "fragile" and "gentile" and describes Lennon's playing as supporting Ono's vocals with "melodic reverb guitar."

Ono often used snow imagery in her songs, including "Snow Piece for Solo" and "Don't Worry Kyoko (Mummy's Only Looking for Her Hand in the Snow)." More generally she sees natural elements, such as wind and snow, as having the power to connect people ("Who Has Seen the Wind?" is an example where she uses wind rather than snow). According to Beatle biographer John Blaney, "Listen, the Snow Is Falling" "combines her fascination with natural elements such as wind and water, with her desire for global harmony and unity."

== Reception ==
According to Rogan "Yoko's voice has never been this attractive or radio-friendly before or since and it is regrettable that the song failed to secure airplay or sympathetic comment from her former critics." Blaney says that "the recording sounded as relaxed and graceful as [Ono's] earlier recordings had sounded tense and feral." Urish and Bielen say that "it is one of [Ono's] best conventional recordings and indicates her early abilities to skillfully fuse her poetic and conceptual imagery with the format of mainstream pop songs, a talent she would continue to develop with increasing success." Music journalist John Kruth states that "[John Lennon's] sweet-soul guitar riffs perfectly frame Yoko's heartfelt vocal. Allmusic critic Stewart Mason calls it "the most conventionally pretty song Ono ever wrote, with an expressive, albeit limited, melody and simple, graceful words far removed from Ono's howling banshee image." The Santa Fe New Mexican critic Steve Terrell described the song as "bland."

"Listen, the Snow Is Falling" was released as a bonus track the 2007 CD release of the Wedding Album. This version incorporates "Yoko's soft, breathy" vocal at the beginning and ending of the song that was removed from the single release in hopes of achieving more radio air play for the song.

== Cover versions ==
Galaxie 500 covered "Listen, the Snow is Falling" on their 1990 album This Is Our Music, with bassist Naomi Yang providing the lead vocal. Mason describes this version as beginning with guitarist Dean Wareham playing "a choppy, echoing electric guitar riff." Then the arrangement builds up slowly with acoustic guitars, sleigh bells and "minimalist drumming from Damon Krukowski. Eventually Wareham breaks into a five minute guitar solo as Yang's bass playing and Kurowski's drumming become more intense.

John Kruth describes this version as evoking "the early Velvet Underground with Nico, as the gentle atmosphere of the song explodes into a charging rhythm, driven by the drums and a two-chord repetitive guitar vamp, building into a wailing coda by guitarist Dean Wareham." Allmusic critic Ned Raggett praises this version praising "Yang singing beautifully over, initially, Wareham's echoed guitar strums, and Krukowski's barely-there percussion cascade." Raggett also remarks that this full-band arrangement makes the song "even more intense and gripping" without ruining the "song's spell." Mason claims that Galaxie 500's version "both transforms the song into something recognizably their own and tops the original." Calgary Herald critic Daniel Ash says that it "captures the fragile rock edge of the Velvet Underground without sounding derivative." The San Francisco Examiner critic Aidin Vaziri described the Galaxie 500 version as a "palatable take" on Ono's song. Philadelphia Inquirer critic Tom Moon felt that the ending of this version was "long and indulgent and full of haywire guitar spew."

Thea Gilmore covered "Listen, the Snow Is Falling" on her 2009 album Strange Communion. The Independent critic Andy Gill called this "the album's most magical moment," calling Gilmore's vocal a "hushed murmur over a shimmering synth-pad sparsely illuminated by the occasional chime."

A cover version by the American musician and songwriter Harry Nilsson was released November 22, 2019 on the posthumous album Losst and Founnd. The album is a collection of recordings made by Nilsson in the final years of his life.
