= A Journal of the Plague Year (album) =

Studio album by Tom Rapp
- Released: 1999
- Genre: Folk, folk rock
- Length: 41:58
- Label: Woronzow
- Producer: Damon Krukowski; Nick Saloman, Ade Shaw

Tom Rapp chronology
| Sunforest (1973) | A Journal of the Plague Year (1999) | The Wizard of Is (2004) |

Professional ratings
Review scores
| Source | Rating |
|---|---|
| AllMusic | 4.5/5 stars |

A Journal of the Plague Year is an album released on CD in 1999 by American singer-songwriter Tom Rapp, leader of the 1960s/70s psychedelic folk group Pearls Before Swine. It was his first new album for 26 years, and included collaborations with Damon and Naomi and Nick Saloman.

== Track listing ==
All songs written by Tom Rapp unless otherwise noted.

1. "Silver Apples (a cappella)" – 1:56 (Yeats / Rapp)
2. "The Swimmer (for Kurt Cobain)" – 3:51
3. "Blind" – 3:15
4. "Space" – 3:27
5. "Mars" – 3:23
6. "Hopelessly Romantic" – 3:38
7. "Running in My Dream" – 4:52
8. "Wedding Song" – 4:15
9. "Silver Apples II (for Simeon)" – 2:35 (Yeats / Rapp)
10. "Shoebox Symphony" – 10:46
  1. Where Is Love?
  2. State U
  3. Just Let the Grass Grow

== Musicians ==
- Tom Rapp - Vocals, Guitar, Harmonica
- Olvardil Prydwyn - Harp, Mandolin, Shenai, Flute
- Naomi Yang - Bass, Vocals
- Damon Krukowski - Drums, Percussion, Vocals
- Nick Saloman - Guitar, Organ, Drums, Mellotron
- Ade Shaw - Bass, Effects
- David Rapp - Electric Guitar
- Carl Edwards - Violin, Vocals
- Andrea Troolin - Cello

== Other credits ==
- Produced and engineered by Damon Krukowski at Kali Studios, Cambridge, Mass.
- Except "Shoebox Symphony" produced by Nick Saloman and Ade Shaw
