= Sunforest =

Sunforest may refer to:

- Sunforest (band), a psychedelic folk band
- Sunforest (album), a Tom Rapp album
