= Uncollected =

Compilation album by Galaxie 500
- Released: August 3, 2004
- Recorded: 1987–1990
- Genres: Dream pop Slowcore
- Length: 52:11
- Label: Rykodisc
- Producers: Kramer; Perkin Barnes

Galaxie 500 chronology
Copenhagen (1997)	Uncollected (2004)	Peel Sessions (2005)

Professional ratings
Review scores
Source	Rating
Allmusic	4/5 stars
Pitchfork Media	(7.2/10)

Uncollected is a compilation album by Galaxie 500, originally released in 1996 as a part of the Galaxie 500 box set. It was later reissued as a single disc in 2004 by Rykodisc Records.

== Track listing ==
All songs written by Galaxie 500 except as noted.

1. "Cheese and Onions" (The Rutles) – 3:05
2. "Them" – 3:42
3. "Final Day" (Young Marble Giants) – 2:54
4. "Blue Thunder" (w/sax) – 3:47
5. "Maracas Song" – 3:53
6. "Crazy" – 1:54
7. "Jerome" – 2:46
8. "Song in 3" – 3:26
9. "Oblivious" – 3:21
10. "I Can't Believe It's Me" – 3:57
11. "Walking Song" – 2:51
12. "The Other Side" – 4:55
13. "On the Floor" – 2:49
14. "Rain" / "Don't Let Our Youth Go to Waste" (The Beatles), (Jonathan Richman) – 8:52

== Releases ==
Year	Label	Format	Catalog no.	Country	Bonus tracks
1996	Rykodisc	Boxset	10355	US	
2004	Rykodisc	enhanced CD	10681	US	"Blue Thunder" (video)
2010	20/20/20	Released as bonus CD with Today	202020.07	US	
