= David Yang =

American violist (born 1967)

- Born: David Yang; 1967 (age 58–59); New York City, U.S.
- Genres: Classical
- Occupation: Musician
- Instrument: Viola
- Labels: New Focus, Somm, Avie
- Member of: Ensemble Epomeo, Auricolae, Newburyport Chamber Music Festival

David Yang (born 1967) is an American violist. He serves as the director of Chamber Music at the University of Pennsylvania.

== Biography ==
David Yang's principal studies were with Martha Strongin Katz, Heidi Castleman, Karen Ritscher, and Stephen Wyrczynski. He is primarily known as a chamber musician and has collaborated with members of ensembles such as the Tokyo String Quartet, Brentano String Quartet, Borromeo String Quartet, Cassatt String Quartet, Miro String Quartet, Vermeer String Quartet, Trio Solisti, Trio Cavatina, and Eroica Trio. In 2009, he received an artist fellowship from the Independence Foundation in Philadelphia, awarded to a small number of "exceptional artists." Yang founded the chamber music program at the University of Pennsylvania in Philadelphia and was its Director for 20 years. He also founded and serves as Artistic Director of the Newburyport Chamber Music Festival. As a founding member of the string trio Ensemble Epomeo, his playing was described as "lithe and expressive" by The Strad Magazine.

Yang is a strong advocate for new music, having commissioned and premiered works by over twenty composers, including Robert Capanna, Andrea Clearfield, Daniel Dorff, Jon Deak, Eric Ewazen, Cynthia Folio, Jeremy Gill, Gerald Levinson, David Ludwig, Robert Maggio, Jay Reise, Kile Smith, Dmitri Tymoczko, Anna Weesner, and Andrew Waggoner. He directs the storytelling and music troupe Auricolae, for which he composes music, and has commissioned many pieces consisting of storytelling and music for narrator, violin, and cello.

He received a bachelors degree in 1989, and a master's degree in 1992 in architecture from the University of Pennsylvania. He worked in the architecture firms of Aldo Rossi and Hugh Hardy.

Yang plays a viola made by the viola da gamba maker Johannes Tielka in 1670, originally owned by the 19th-century violin virtuoso Joseph Joachim, a close friend of Johannes Brahms. He records for the New Focus, Somm, and Avie labels. He is also an avid cyclist and swimmer.

== Personal life ==
Yang's father was noted landscape photographer John Yang, and his mother, Linda Gureasko Yang, was a garden columnist for The New York Times. His sister, Naomi Yang, was the electric bass player of the 90s cult alternative band Galaxie 500, and a photographer.

He has two daughters.
