= Damon & Naomi =

American musical duo

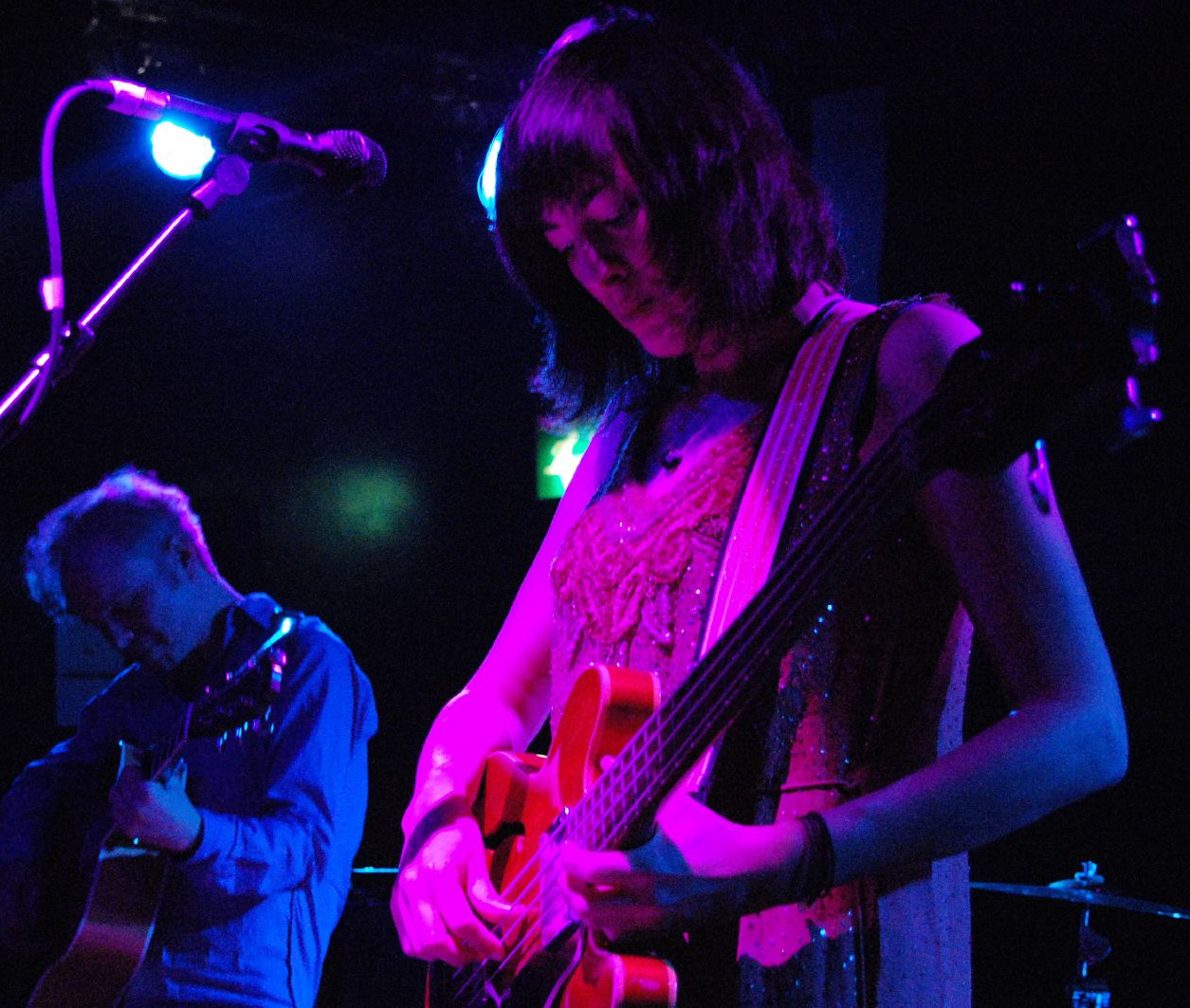
- Damon & Naomi performing at The Scala in London, November 2007

Background information
- Origin: Boston, Massachusetts, United States
- Genres: Dream pop, indie folk
- Years active: 1992–present
- Labels: Rough Trade, Shimmy Disc, Sub Pop, Rykodisc, 20-20-20
- Spinoffs: Magic Hour
- Spinoff of: Galaxie 500
- Members: Damon Krukowski; Naomi Yang
- Website: www.damonandnaomi.com

Damon & Naomi are an American dream pop/indie folk duo, formed in 1991 by Damon Krukowski and Naomi Yang, formerly of Galaxie 500.

== History ==
After Galaxie 500 completed a tour of the US supporting Cocteau Twins, guitarist and vocalist Dean Wareham quit the band, forcing the cancellation of an imminent Japanese tour. Damon & Naomi had recorded a few tracks before the split, and these were released under the name Pierre Etoile by Rough Trade (UK) in July 1991. The duo then spent time working on their book publishing company Exact Change, with no plans to return to recording, until producer Mark Kramer urged them back into the studio. The resulting album, More Sad Hits was released on Kramer's Shimmy Disc label in 1992.

Following the release of More Sad Hits, Damon & Naomi were contacted by Kate Biggar and Wayne Rogers, whose band, Crystalized Movements, had recently lost its rhythm section. The two couples teamed up to form the psychedelic rock band Magic Hour, and released three albums between 1993 and 1996. At the same time, Damon & Naomi continued to record as a duo, releasing their second album, The Wondrous World of Damon & Naomi on Sub Pop, in 1995. The album was again produced by Kramer, however there was controversy as Kramer's production recreated the psychedelic leanings of the band's debut rather than the acoustic approach the band now preferred. Kramer initially refused to make changes, and although he eventually relented, he refused to return the original masters, claiming that they were destroyed. In 2013, that initial mix (including a heretofore unreleased track) was released as The Wondrous World of Damon & Naomi, Bootleg Edition on the band's own 20/20/20 label for Record Store Day.

After the release of their second album, Damon & Naomi decided that they were ready to return to live performance. In a 1998 interview, Krukowski said "We never thought we would perform because there's no rhythm section, and us being a former rhythm section, we thought there's nothing worse than a band without a rhythm section."

Their third album, Playback Singers, was recorded in 1998, at their home studio (Kali Studios) in Cambridge, MA, and was their first album recorded without the assistance of Kramer. The album included the song "Awake in a Muddle", written by Masaki Batoh of the psychedelic rock band Ghost, which marked the beginning of the ongoing relationship between the duo and the Japanese band. The album also included a cover of the Tom Rapp (Pearls Before Swine) song "Translucent Carriages", which the duo had performed with Rapp when he came out of retirement for the first Terrastock music festival, in 1997. Krukowski produced re-recordings of two Pearls Before Swine tracks that appeared on the compilation album Constructive Melancholy that was released in 1998. He also produced Rapp's 1999 album A Journal of the Plague Year, on which both Damon & Naomi appeared as musicians.

In 2000, they cemented the relationship with Ghost by releasing the collaborative album Damon & Naomi with Ghost, recorded once again at the duo's Kali studios. The tour in support of the album featured Ghost guitarist Michio Kurihara. In 2002, the Live in San Sebastian album was released, which had been recorded in May 2001 with Kurihara; the album was released with an additional DVD featuring a video tour diary by Yang. Ghost singer-guitarist Masaki Batoh's post-Ghost band The Silence would cover Damon & Naomi's "Little Red Record Company" on their second album Hark The Silence.

During 2004, Damon had a book of poetry published (The Memory Theater Burned) and the duo also worked on pulling together a double DVD of Galaxie 500 videos that was released by Plexifilm. On Valentine's Day 2005, Damon & Naomi's fifth studio album, The Earth Is Blue, was released on their own |20|20|20 label, the duo having amicably terminated their relationship with Sub Pop. The album again featured Kurihara on guitar as well as the avant-garde brass section of Greg Kelley and Bhob Rainey of Nmperign. The supporting tour featured all the guest musicians and one of the Japanese dates of the tour was videotaped and released as a limited-edition DVD at the end of 2005.

In 2006, Damon & Naomi set about recording their next album at Kali Studios, once again with Kurihara guesting. The band's sixth studio album Within These Walls was released in September 2007, also on their own |20|20|20 label.

Damon & Naomi released their seventh studio album False Beats and True Hearts on May 9, 2011, once again on their |20|20|20 label and on Broken Horse (UK & Europe).

== Discography ==
=== Albums ===
- More Sad Hits (1992) Shimmy Disc
- The Wondrous World of Damon & Naomi (1995) Sub Pop
- Playback Singers (1998) Sub Pop/Rykodisc
- With Ghost (2000)
- Song to the Siren (2002)
- The Earth Is Blue (2005)
- Within These Walls (2007)
- False Beats and True Hearts (2011)
- The Wondrous World of Damon & Naomi, Bootleg Edition (2013) 20/20/20
- Fortune (2015)
- A Sky Record (2021)

=== DVDs ===
- 1001 Nights (2009) released by Factory 25
- Shibua O-Nest, Tokyo Japan (2005) (exclusive website-only release)
