= The Buddyrevelles =

American indie rock band

- Origin: Eau Claire; Wisconsin; United States
- Genres: Indie rock, Indie pop
- Years active: 1997–Present
- Labels: Motorcoat Records
- Members: Aaron Grant; Scott Hoch; Dan Reinholdt

The Buddyrevelles are an American indie rock band that is based in Chicago, Illinois. Band members include Aaron Grant on guitars and lead vocals, Scott Hoch on bass and background vocals, and Dan Reinholdt on drums.

== History ==
The Buddyrevelles formed in 1997 in Eau Claire, Wisconsin, where they recorded their first album, September, November, which was released by Motorcoat Records. The album received a very strong review from Pitchfork Media, including a 9.1 rating. The review said that "the band sounds like a cross between Chicago post-rock, the best Galaxie 500 material, and the hope of a better future." They subsequently relocated to Chicago, where they recorded their second album, American Matador, released in 2000 also on the Motorcoat label. Pitchfork again reviewed the album positively, giving it an 8.0 rating and calling it "a true step forward for an already excellent band." It also received a glowing review from Rolling Stone. After an extended hiatus, the band resurfaced in 2007 with a new album, Don't Quit on Solitaire Records. They produced a video for the song "I Dream of Rodney" from the album, which won the "best video" award at the 5th annual Sprockets Film Festival in Athens, Georgia.
