= More Sad Hits =

Studio album by Damon & Naomi
- Released: 1992
- Recorded: Summer 1992
- Studio: Noise New Jersey (Jersey City, New Jersey)
- Genre: Slowcore
- Length: 43:57
- Label: Shimmy Disc
- Producer: Kramer

Damon & Naomi chronology
Pierre Étoile (1991)	More Sad Hits (1992)	The Wondrous World of Damon & Naomi (1995)

Professional ratings
Review scores
Source	Rating
AllMusic	3.5/5 stars
Pitchfork Media	7.0/10
Q	3/5 stars

More Sad Hits is the debut studio album by Damon & Naomi, released in 1992 by Shimmy Disc.

== History ==
In 1991, drummer Damon Krukowski and bassist Naomi Yang had just completed a tour of the US with their band Galaxie 500 supporting Cocteau Twins, when Galaxie 500 guitarist/vocalist Dean Wareham quit the band, forcing the cancellation of an imminent Japanese tour. Krukowski and Yang had recorded three tracks before the split, and these were released as a 12" single under the name Pierre Étoile by Rough Trade in the UK in July 1991. The duo then spent time working on their book publishing company Exact Change with no plans to return to recording, until producer Mark Kramer urged them back into the studio, resulting in the album, More Sad Hits. Kramer, who also played on the album, released it on his Shimmy Disc label in 1992, attributed too the duo Damon & Naomi.

== Track listing ==
All tracks are written by Damon Krukowski and Naomi Yang, except "Memories" by Hugh Hopper and "This Changing World" by Jean-Claude Olivier.

No.	Title	Length
1.	"E.T.A."	3:50
2.	"Little Red Record Co."	5:16
3.	"Information Age"	2:47
4.	"Laika"	3:43
5.	"This Car Climbed Mt. Washington"	4:53
6.	"Memories"	2:53
7.	"Astrafiammante"	4:41
8.	"Boston's Daily Temperature"	2:36
9.	"(Scene Change)"	1:30
10.	"Sir Thomas and Sir Robert"	2:17
11.	"Once More"	5:24
12.	"This Changing World"	4:07

== Personnel ==
Adapted from More Sad Hits liner notes.

Musicians

- Kramer – vocals, instruments, arrangements, production, engineering
- Damon Krukowski – vocals, instruments
- Naomi Yang – vocals, instruments, design

Production and additional personnel

- Michael Macioce – photography
- Man Ray – cover art

== Release history ==
Region	Date	Label	Format	Catalog
United States	1992	Shimmy Disc	CD, CS, LP	shimmy 058
United States	1997	Sub Pop	CD	SPCD 385
United States	1998	Rykodisc	CD	RCD 10439
United States	2008	20|20|20	CD, LP	202020.06
