= City of Gold (Pearls Before Swine album) =

Studio album by Tom Rapp and Pearls Before Swine
- Released: April 1971
- Recorded: 1970
- Genre: Psychedelic folk, folk rock, country rock
- Length: 27:21
- Label: Reprise RS 6442
- Producer: Tom Rapp

Tom Rapp and Pearls Before Swine chronology
The Use of Ashes (1970)	City of Gold (1971)	Beautiful Lies You Could Live In (1971)

Professional ratings
Review scores
Source	Rating
Allmusic	2/5 stars

City of Gold was the fifth album made by American psychedelic folk group Pearls Before Swine, and their third on Reprise Records. It was released in 1971.

The album was the first to be credited to "Thos." (Tom) Rapp and Pearls Before Swine, rather than solely in the group's name. In fact, the group, which had been formed by Rapp and his friends in Florida in the mid-1960s, and which in its original incarnation had never performed live, had effectively ceased to exist by the time of their third album These Things Too, and subsequent albums had been recorded by Rapp with his wife Elisabeth and session musicians.

City of Gold drew heavily on material left over from the recording of the previous Pearls album, The Use of Ashes, which had been recorded in early 1970 with the cream of Nashville's session musicians. Further recording sessions took place in New York later that year, with Rapp taking on producer duties.

The album, while having a broadly country/folk feel, is very mixed in content and, in most critics' estimation, quality. However, it does contain some of Rapp's best lyrics, sparkling arrangements, and some of his most heartfelt vocal performances, such as on the harpsichord-dominated version of Leonard Cohen's "(Seems So Long Ago) Nancy", and his own "Did You Dream Of". It also includes a very atypical up-tempo Rapp song, "The Man", sung vigorously by David Noyes. According to Noyes, a high school student at the time, the song was recorded at A&R Studios in New York City during the summer of 1969; Noyes also sang harmony vocals on other songs, including "Seasons in the Sun". Noyes' friend, Jon Tooker, took his position when the band toured Europe later in the year.

The sleeve design broke with the group's tradition of using classic art rather than photographs of the musicians. The front cover showed a hand-painted photograph of Rapp, taken in the Netherlands where many of the songs had been written. The photograph on the back of the cover shows Rapp, Jon Tooker, Gordon Hayes and Michael Krawitz. This was the version of Pearls Before Swine which toured in 1971, but Tooker, Hayes and Krawitz did not play on the album itself (although they did play on the next album, Beautiful Lies).

City of Gold was issued on CD in 2003 as part of the Jewels Were the Stars compendium of Pearls Before Swine's first four Reprise albums.

== Track listing ==
1. "Sonnet #65" - 0:41 (Shakespeare / Rapp)
2. "Once Upon a Time" - 2:37 (Rapp)
3. "Raindrops" - 2:05 (Rapp)
4. "City of Gold" - 2:57 (Rapp)
5. "Nancy" - 4:46 (Cohen)
6. "Seasons in the Sun" - 2:55 (Brel / McKuen)
7. "My Father" - 2:08 (Collins)
8. "The Man" - 2:23 (Rapp)
9. "Casablanca" - 2:23 (Rapp)
10. "Wedding" - 1:37 (Rapp)
11. "Did You Dream Of" - 2:49 (Rapp)

== Personnel ==
- Tom Rapp: Vocals, Guitar
- Elisabeth (Rapp): Vocals
- David Noyes: Vocals (on "The Man")
- Charlie McCoy: Dobro, Guitar, Bass, Harmonica
- Norbert Putnam: Bass
- Kenneth Buttrey: Drums
- Buddy Spicher: Violin, Cello, Viola
- Mac Gayden: Guitars
- David Briggs: Piano, Harpsichord
- John Duke: Oboe, Flute
- Hutch Davie: Keyboard
- Bill Pippin: Oboe, Flute

=== Other credits ===
- Dedicated to David Fredrick Patrick: being and to be
- Art Direction: Ed Thrasher
- Recorded in New York and Nashville, Fall 1970
