= The Earth Is Blue =

Studio album by Damon & Naomi
- Released: 2005
- Genres: Pop; psychedelia
- Length: 49:56
- Label: 20/20/20

Damon & Naomi chronology
Song to the Siren (2002)	The Earth Is Blue (2005)	Within These Walls (2007)

The Earth Is Blue is an album by the American musical duo Damon & Naomi, released in 2005 on their newly formed label, 20/20/20 (an homage to the board game Careers). The duo supported the album with a North American tour.

== Production ==
The album was recorded over 18 months at Damon & Naomi's home studio, in Cambridge, Massachusetts; they had to rebuild it during the sessions to accommodate the scope of the album. The duo recorded deliberately, instead of trying to find the sound in the moment, so as not to annoy their neighbors. They were joined by the Ghost guitarist Michio Kurihara. The horn group Nmperign played on a few of the tracks. The duo initially intended to make a more political album, before again turning toward autobiographical lyrics. "While My Guitar Gently Weeps" is a cover of the George Harrison song, which uses only part of the structure and melody. "Araçá Azul" is a version of the title track to Caetano Veloso's 1972 album.

== Critical reception ==
Professional ratings
Review scores
Source	Rating
Birmingham Post	4/5 stars
Chicago Sun-Times	3.5/4 stars
The Hamilton Spectator	2.5/4 stars
Philadelphia Daily News	C+
Pitchfork	8.0/10
The Province	C+
The Republican	3/5 stars
Uncut	4/5 stars
Winnipeg Sun	3.5/5 stars

The Boston Globe labeled the album a "gorgeous, lush disc." The Republican said that "dream-weaving psychedelia, late-night jazz and traces of shimmering chamber pop float throughout". The Philadelphia Daily News opined that the duo "crank up the low-fi atmospherics ... There's not much musically to hold onto, except a cover of 'While My Guitar Gently Weeps'." The Sunday Times noted that the Harrison cover "takes the translucent form of a medieval folk song." The Columbus Dispatch panned Damon's "colorless, midrange moan."

The Capital Times concluded that Damon & Naomi "have a penchant for gorgeous melodies and wistful lyrics that can lull the unwary listener into a pleasant trance." The Toronto Star stated that the duo "weaves together strands of Fairport Convention, Low and trip/hop". The Hamilton Spectator called the songs "more clearly defined this time". The Chicago Tribune stated that the duo "have fashioned a remarkably gentle, ethereal brand of psychedelia that fuses the evanescent shimmer of their former bank Galaxie 500 with the opiate-induced dreaminess of Country Joe and the Fish, or Love at their most introspective." Jim DeRogatis, in the Chicago Sun-Times, wrote that he would "hold their catalog up against former partner Dean Wareham's output with his post-Galaxie band Luna any day"; he later listed The Earth Is Blue as the 15th best album of 2005.

== Track listing ==
No.	Title	Length
1.	"Beautiful Close Double"	4:37
2.	"A Second Life"	4:46
3.	"Malibran"	4:39
4.	"House of Glass"	6:23
5.	"Sometimes"	4:42
6.	"While My Guitar Gently Weeps"	5:36
7.	"Ueno Station"	5:16
8.	"The Robot Speaks"	4:27
9.	"Araçá Azul"	2:43
10.	"The Earth Is Blue"	6:47
Total length:		49:56
