= The Portable Galaxie 500 =

Greatest hits album by Galaxie 500
- Released: September 29, 1998
- Recorded: 1988–1990
- Genres: Dream pop; slowcore
- Length: 60:38
- Label: Rykodisc
- Producer: Mark Kramer

Galaxie 500 chronology
Copenhagen (1997)	The Portable Galaxie 500 (1998)	Uncollected (2004)

Professional ratings
Review scores
Source	Rating
AllMusic	4.5/5 stars
The Encyclopedia of Popular Music	4/5 stars
NME	8/10
The New Rolling Stone Album Guide	4/5 stars

The Portable Galaxie 500 is a compilation album by the rock band Galaxie 500. It was released in 1998 on Rykodisc.

== Track listing ==
All songs written by Galaxie 500 except as noted.

1. "Blue Thunder" (w/sax)
2. "Flowers"
3. "When Will You Come Home"
4. "Listen, The Snow Is Falling" (Yoko Ono)
5. "Sorry"
6. "Fourth of July"
7. "Don't Let Our Youth Go to Waste" (Jonathan Richman)
8. "Strange"
9. "Another Day"
10. "Snowstorm"
11. "Summertime" (live)
12. "Tugboat"

== Releases ==
Year	Label	Format	Catalog no.	Country	Bonus tracks
1998	Rykodisc	Enhanced CD	10445	US	"Tugboat" (video)
