= On Fire (Galaxie 500 album) =

Studio album by Galaxie 500
- Released: October 23, 1989
- Recorded: 1989
- Studio: Noise New York
- Genres: Slowcore; dream pop; psychedelia
- Length: 40:13
- Label: Rough Trade
- Producer: Mark Kramer

Galaxie 500 chronology
Today (1988)	On Fire (1989)	This Is Our Music (1990)

Singles from On Fire
- 1. "Blue Thunder" Released: February 1990

On Fire is the second studio album by American indie rock band Galaxie 500, released in 1989 on Rough Trade Records.

In 2010, the album was re-issued and peaked at number 45 on the UK Independent Albums Chart and number 10 on the UK Independent Album Breakers Chart.

== Music ==
On Fire's music has been described as "droning [and] doleful." According to Jenn Pelly of Pitchfork: "On Fire sounds like the Velvet Underground slowly warming up [...] as if the instruments have eclipsed one another, moving with the crawl of a cloud." The album contains elements of neo-psychedelia.

== Critical reception ==
Professional ratings
Review scores
Source	Rating
AllMusic	4.5/5 stars
Chicago Tribune	3/4 stars
Mojo	5/5 stars
NME	7/10
Pitchfork	10/10
Record Collector	5/5 stars
Rolling Stone	4/5 stars
The Rolling Stone Album Guide	4.5/5 stars
Spin Alternative Record Guide	8/10
The Village Voice	B

Pete Clark of Hi-Fi News & Record Review described the album as "[sliding] through the speakers, encircling the unwary listener with snaking lines of guitar, restrained percussion and a confessional-style vocal."

The Rolling Stone Album Guide called it Galaxie 500's "best album by far". In 2002, Pitchfork placed it at number 16 on its "Top 100 Albums of the 1980s" list. In 2013, Fact placed it at number 51 on its "100 Best Albums of the 1980s" list. In 2018, Pitchfork ranked it fourth on its "The 30 Best Dream Pop Albums" list.

== Track listing ==
All tracks are written by Galaxie 500, except where noted.

No.	Title	Writer(s)	Length
1.	"Blue Thunder"		3:45
2.	"Tell Me"		3:50
3.	"Snowstorm"		5:10
4.	"Strange"		3:16
5.	"When Will You Come Home"		5:21
6.	"Decomposing Trees"		4:05
7.	"Another Day"		3:41
8.	"Leave the Planet"		2:40
9.	"Plastic Bird"		3:15
10.	"Isn't It a Pity"	George Harrison	5:10
Total length:			40:13

1997 CD reissue bonus tracks
No.	Title	Writer(s)	Length
11.	"Victory Garden"	Steve Cunningham, Mayo Thompson	2:48
12.	"Ceremony"	Ian Curtis, Peter Hook, Stephen Morris, Bernard Sumner	5:55
13.	"Cold Night"		2:36
Total length:			51:32

== Personnel ==
Credits adapted from liner notes.

Galaxie 500

- Damon Krukowski – drums
- Dean Wareham – guitar, vocals
- Naomi Yang – bass guitar, vocals on "Another Day"

Additional personnel

- Mark Kramer – production, engineering, "cheap organ" on "Isn't It a Pity"
- Ralph Carney – tenor saxophone on "Decomposing Trees"

== Charts ==
Chart (1989)	Peak position
UK Independent Albums (MRIB)	7

Chart (2010)	Peak position
UK Independent Albums (Official Charts)	45
UK Independent Album Breakers (OCC)	10

== Release history ==
Year	Label	Format	Region
1989	Rough Trade	LP, CD, cassette	UK
1989	Rough Trade US	LP, CD	US
1997	Rykodisc	LP, CD	US
2009	20/20/20	LP	US
