= This Is Our Music (Galaxie 500 album) =

Studio album by Galaxie 500
- Released: September 1990
- Recorded: 1990
- Studio: Noise New York
- Genres: Dream pop; slowcore
- Length: 45:45
- Label: Rough Trade
- Producer: Mark Kramer

Galaxie 500 chronology
On Fire (1989)	This Is Our Music (1990)	Copenhagen (1997)

Singles from This Is Our Music
- 1. "Fourth of July" Released: September 1990

This Is Our Music is the third and final studio album by American indie rock band Galaxie 500, released in 1990 on Rough Trade Records.

The title This Is Our Music was derived from the 1961 album of the same name by Ornette Coleman.

In 2010, the album was re-issued and peaked at number 18 on the UK Independent Album Breakers Chart.

== Critical reception and legacy ==
Professional ratings
Review scores
Source	Rating
AllMusic	4.5/5 stars
Chicago Tribune	3/4 stars
Entertainment Weekly	B−
Mojo	5/5 stars
NME	7/10
Pitchfork	8.3/10
Record Collector	4/5 stars
The Rolling Stone Album Guide	3.5/5 stars
Select	5/5
The Village Voice	B−

Select critic Andrew Perry lauded This Is Our Music as a progression from Galaxie 500's previous work, noting its "more brilliant, inspirationally unsophisticated melodies ... allied to an instrumental audacity that is entirely new", and concluded that "Galaxie 500's music is still rooted in the minimalist confines of their soft songs ... but it has come of age." Stephen Dalton of NME, while finding certain songs to be overlong, complimented the album's "artful" music and "quiet humour".

In a retrospective review for AllMusic, Ned Raggett called This Is Our Music "arguably the band's most accomplished" album and highlighted the band members' individual performances: "Somehow ... everyone aims higher, Wareham's singing among his finest and his guitar going for the truly epic more than once, Krukowski and Yang even more perfectly in sync than before, often being very bold without losing their intrinsic warmth."

Music critic Jim DeRogatis said Galaxie 500 “bowed out in style” with the album.

== Track listing ==
All tracks are written by Galaxie 500, except as noted.

No.	Title	Writer(s)	Length
1.	"Fourth of July"		5:35
2.	"Hearing Voices"		3:34
3.	"Spook"		4:35
4.	"Summertime"		5:59
5.	"Way Up High"		4:03
6.	"Listen, the Snow Is Falling"	Yoko Ono	7:48
7.	"Sorry"		4:15
8.	"Melt Away"		4:35
9.	"King of Spain, Pt. 2"		5:07
Total length:			45:45

1997 CD reissue bonus track
No.	Title	Writer(s)	Length
10.	"Here She Comes Now"	Lou Reed, John Cale, Sterling Morrison	5:58
Total length:			51:52

== Personnel ==
Credits adapted from liner notes.

Galaxie 500

- Damon Krukowski – drums, backup vocals
- Dean Wareham – guitar, vocals
- Naomi Yang – bass guitar, vocals on "Listen, the Snow Is Falling"

Additional personnel

- Mark Kramer – production, engineering, mirage, "cheap flute", backup vocals
- Norman Gholson – photography
- Ray Agony – photography

== Charts ==
Chart (2010)	Peak position
UK Independent Album Breakers (OCC)	18

== Release history ==
Year	Label	Format	Region
1990	Rough Trade	LP, CD, cassette	UK
1990	Rough Trade US	CD	US
1997	Rykodisc	CD	US
2010	20/20/20	LP	US
