= Peel Sessions (Galaxie 500 album) =

Live album by Galaxie 500
- Released: November 15, 2005
- Recorded: September 24, 1989; October 30, 1990
- Genres: Dream pop; slowcore
- Length: 34:56
- Label: 20/20/20

Galaxie 500 chronology
Uncollected (2004)	Peel Sessions (2005)	Uncollected Noise New York '88–'90 (2024)

Professional ratings
Review scores
Source	Rating
AllMusic	4/5 stars
NME	8/10
Pitchfork	8.4/10
Prefix Magazine	8/10
Stylus Magazine	B+

Peel Sessions is a live album compiling two BBC radio sessions by Galaxie 500.

== Track listing ==
All songs written by Galaxie 500 except as noted.

1. "Submission" (Sex Pistols) – 4:10
2. "Final Day" (Young Marble Giants) – 2:54
3. "When Will You Come Home" – 5:11
4. "Moonshot" (Buffy Sainte-Marie) – 3:21
5. "Flowers" – 4:39
6. "Blue Thunder" – 3:49
7. "Decomposing Trees" – 4:04
8. "Don't Let Our Youth Go to Waste" (Jonathan Richman) – 6:48
