= Familiar Songs =

Album by Tom Rapp

Studio album by Tom Rapp
- Released: 1972
- Length: 33:11
- Label: Reprise

Tom Rapp chronology
Beautiful Lies You Could Live In (1971)	Familiar Songs (1972)	Stardancer (1972)

Professional ratings
Review scores
Source	Rating
AllMusic	2/5 stars

Familiar Songs is an album released on Reprise Records in 1972 by American singer-songwriter Tom Rapp, the leader of folk-rock group Pearls Before Swine. It was presented as his first solo album, although several previous albums credited to Pearls Before Swine had actually been recorded by Rapp with session musicians, rather than by a working group. The album is also sometimes known simply as Tom Rapp, because its title does not appear on the front sleeve.

The album was released by Reprise without Rapp's approval or knowledge. According to Rapp, Reprise wanted to issue an album of the best songs from his Pearls Before Swine recordings, and he went into Brooks Arthur's 914 Studios in New York City, with musicians Robbie Merkin (piano), David Wolfert (guitar) and Morrie Brown (bass), to work up ideas for re-recording some of the songs in a new way. Although some of the ideas succeeded, he felt that others needed more work, and the album was put on hold. However, his manager, who (rather than Rapp himself) held the contract with Reprise, passed the tapes to the record company, and later disappeared. Rapp only discovered that the record had been issued when he came upon it in a record store. Not surprisingly, he subsequently disowned the album but was actively involved when it was reissued on CD in 2004.

The album eschews the atmospheric, sometimes psychedelic, arrangements of the Pearls Before Swine records for a more orthodox rock sound. It contains two songs, "Grace Street" and "Charley And The Lady", not available elsewhere. Although most critics have disregarded the album because of its contentious origins, Rapp himself has commented favourably on the quality of the musicianship and on some of the song treatments.

== Track listing ==
All tracks composed by Tom Rapp

1. "Grace Street" - 3:05
2. "The Jeweler" - 3:26
3. "Rocket Man" - 3:01
4. "Snow Queen" - 3:42
5. "If You Don't Want To (I Don't Mind)" - 3:14
6. "Charley And The Lady" - 3:19
7. "Margery" - 3:08
8. "Medley: Full Phantom Five and I Shall Not Care" - 2:54
9. "These Things Too - 3:37
10. "Sail Away" - 3:45

== Personnel ==
- Tom Rapp - vocals, guitar
- Robbie Merkin - piano
- David Wolfert - guitar
- Morrie Brown - bass
- Billy Mundi - drums (uncredited)
- Charles R. Rothschild and Peter H. Edmiston Production (as shown on original vinyl issue)
