= Tom Rapp =

American singer-songwriter (1947–2018)

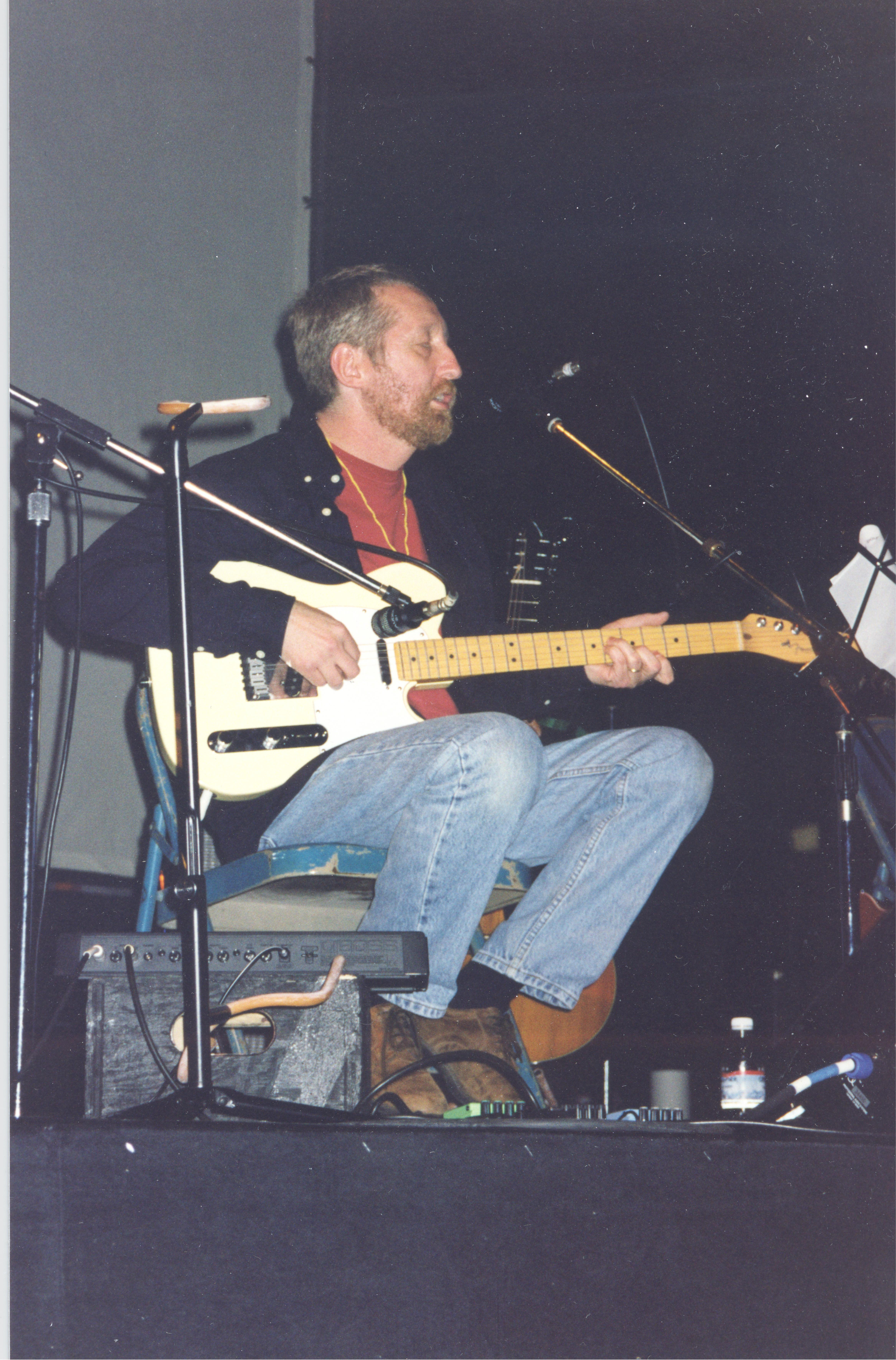
- Rapp in a 1998 concert

Background information
- Born: Thomas Dale Rapp; March 8, 1947; Bottineau, North Dakota, United States
- Died: February 11, 2018 (aged 70) Melbourne, Florida, U.S.
- Occupations: Singer, songwriter, attorney
- Instruments: Vocals, guitar, etc.
- Years active: 1965–1976 occasionally 1997–2006
- Labels: ESP-Disk, Reprise, Blue Thumb, Woronzow, Drag City
- Formerly of: Pearls Before Swine

Thomas Dale Rapp (March 8, 1947 – February 11, 2018) was an American singer and songwriter who led Pearls Before Swine, an influential psychedelic folk rock group of the late 1960s and early 1970s. Described as having "a slight lisp, gentle voice and apocalyptic vision", he also released four albums under his own name. He later practiced as a lawyer after graduating from University of Pennsylvania Law School in 1984.

== Early life ==
Tom Rapp was born in Bottineau, North Dakota. His parents, Dale and Eileen Rapp, were both school teachers, and his father became a heavy drinker often absent from their home. He had two sisters.

When Rapp was a young child the family moved to Minnesota, where at the age of six he was given a guitar. A neighbour who was a country and western musician taught Rapp some chords, and he also learned to play the ukulele. He began writing songs, and (according to a local newspaper cutting kept by his mother) once came third in a talent contest in Rochester when he was aged eight, where Bobby Zimmerman, probably the boy who was later known as Bob Dylan, came in fifth. The Rapp family moved from Minnesota to Pennsylvania before settling in Eau Gallie, Florida, in 1963. Tom Rapp graduated from Eau Gallie High School in 1965.

== Music career, 1965–1976 ==
In Florida, Rapp became a fan of Bob Dylan, Joan Baez, Woody Guthrie and Bessie Smith, and formed Pearls Before Swine in 1965 with high school friends Wayne Harley, Roger Crissinger, and Lane Lederer. On the basis of thinking "if they'll record The Fugs, they'll record us", the following year they sent demo recordings to ESP-Disk Records in New York. The label agreed to record the band's first album, One Nation Underground, predominantly consisting of Rapp's own songs and produced in New York by Richard Alderson. Rapp sang and played lead guitar. He said: "We were just kids from Florida and everything was so hip, we thought we might faint." The record sold an estimated 200,000 copies, but Rapp said that "We never got any money from ESP. Never, not even like a hundred dollars or something. My real sense is that he (Bernard Stollman) was abducted by aliens, and when he was probed it erased his memory of where all the money was". After their second album, the experimental and anti-war themed Balaklava, often regarded as the group's finest, the group split up.

By the time of the third Pearls Before Swine album, These Things Too for Reprise in 1969, the other original members of the group had left, but Rapp retained the group name for recordings. At this time, Pearls Before Swine did not exist as a performing band. The next three Pearls Before Swine albums, The Use of Ashes (1970), City of Gold (1971), and Beautiful Lies You Could Live In (1971), contain some of Rapp's best songs, and were recorded with his Dutch wife Elisabeth and top session musicians in Nashville and New York City. He toured with Buddy Guy, Gordon Lightfoot, Chuck Berry and Bob Dylan, but turned down the opportunity to appear at the Woodstock festival.

Rapp's lyrics "told hard truths about the human condition"; they were sometimes confrontational and cynical, but often embraced a "whimsical brand of mystical humanism". His songs included "Rocket Man", which inspired Bernie Taupin and Elton John's song of the same name.

The album Familiar Songs (1972) was his first credited solo album, but was in fact a collection of demo recordings released by the record company without his knowledge. After moving from Reprise to Blue Thumb Records, he released two further albums under his own name, Stardancer (1972) and Sunforest (1973). Although these were issued as solo albums, they included recordings by a new version of Pearls Before Swine which from 1970 did tour and perform widely, once opening for Pink Floyd, as well as containing Rapp's solo recordings with session musicians. Between 1974 and 1976, Rapp performed as a solo singer-songwriter but did not record.

Rapp later considered that the contracts he signed with his manager, Peter H. Edmiston, were a mistake as they allowed Edmiston to control Rapp's relationships with record companies and accrue all the financial benefits. Rapp said: "Any of the money he made... was gone. He had taken all that. It would have been a different life if I'd gotten all the money I was supposed to have gotten." Rapp estimated that his total net income from music during his active career had been about $200. After a final show as a supporting act to Patti Smith, he retired from music in 1976.

== Later life and career ==
Rapp then worked as a theater receptionist and projectionist in Cambridge, Massachusetts, and New York, before entering higher education. He graduated in economics from Brandeis University in 1981, and then studied at the University of Pennsylvania Law School, graduating in 1984 and becoming a civil rights lawyer. He described his legal work as an extension of his politically-attuned music, his areas of expertise including judicial estoppel and finding constitutional grounds upon which to challenge corporate actions. He later lived and worked in Philadelphia and Florida. In 2008, it was reported that Rapp and another attorney sued in federal court to reverse their termination as county government lawyers.

After being interviewed in 1993 by the magazine Dirty Linen, and later contacted by Phil McMullen of the magazine Ptolemaic Terrascope, he reappeared in 1997 at Terrastock, a music festival in Providence, Rhode Island, with his son's band, Shy Camp. He recorded the album A Journal of the Plague Year, released in 1999. He also performed at Terrastock 5 in October 2002 and Terrastock 6 in April 2006.

== Personal life ==
Rapp was married three times: firstly to Elisabeth Joosten (who sang on some of his recordings) from 1968 to 1976; secondly, to Susan Hein; and, from 1995, Lynn Madison. He had a son, David, from his first marriage.

== Death ==
Tom Rapp died at home in Melbourne, Florida, in 2018, after suffering from cancer.

== Discography ==
=== Solo albums ===
- Familiar Songs (1972, Reprise)
- Stardancer (1972, Blue Thumb)
- Sunforest (1973, Blue Thumb)
- A Journal of the Plague Year (1999, Woronzow)

† Tom Rapp appeared on the 1999 Neil Young 2CD tribute This Note's for You Too, on Inbetweens Records, with the song "After the Gold Rush".
† Tom Rapp contributed vocals to the song "Shadows" for the band Old Fire on their album, 'Songs From the Haunted South', released in 2016 by Kscope Records.
