= Balaklava (album) =

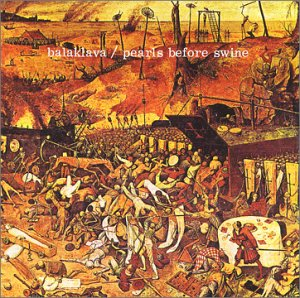

Studio album by Pearls Before Swine
- Released: November 1968
- Recorded: 1968
- Genres: Psychedelic folk, folk rock
- Length: 29:49
- Labels: ESP-Disk (original US release); Fontana (UK & Netherlands release); Drag City (2018 reissue)
- Producer: Richard L. Alderson

Pearls Before Swine chronology
One Nation Underground (1967)	Balaklava (1968)	These Things Too (1969)

Professional ratings
Review scores
Source	Rating
Allmusic	4.5/5 stars

Balaklava was the second album recorded and released by psychedelic folk group Pearls Before Swine in 1968.

== Concept ==
For the album, original group members Tom Rapp, Wayne Harley and Lane Lederer were joined by Jim Bohannon, who replaced Roger Crissinger. Like the group's previous LP recorded on ESP-Disk, entitled One Nation Underground, it was recorded at Richard Alderson's Impact Sound studio in New York City. Recordings took place sometime in early 1968, but no complete records of the sessions have been published. Some CD reissues have stated that it was recorded in 1965, but this is an error. Lederer left the group during or shortly after the recordings, and the basic group was augmented by studio musicians.

Rapp stated that he wanted to produce a themed anti-war album, and chose the Charge of the Light Brigade at Balaklava in 1854 as an example of the futility of war. The album was dedicated to Private Edward Slovik, the only United States soldier executed for desertion during the Second World War.

Producer Richard Alderson said: "I had made great progress in building up my studio on West 65th Street in NYC where Balaklava was recorded. I had added many microphones, outboard gear, and a very early Ampex 8 track 1” master recorder. We also had a collection of many exotic musical instruments and a great selection of sound effects available. This enabled a full studio production palette.... Balaklava was primarily an anti-war statement, and secondarily an aural essay on the history of sound and recording. Often these premises are conjoined".

== The album cover ==
The front cover is a detail of The Triumph of Death by Pieter Brueghel the Elder, showing a grotesque allegorical depiction of the horrors of war, while the back cover showed a photograph of a young girl at an anti-war protest taken by Mel Zimmer. The cover also included the quote "Only the dead have seen the end of war" by George Santayana, together with surreal and horrific drawings by avant-garde artist Jean Cocteau. The cover contributed to the mystique surrounding the group: few if any photographs of its members were published, and Pearls Before Swine did not perform in concert until 1971.

== The songs ==
The album starts with the track "Trumpeter Landfrey", taken from an archived 1890 cylinder recording that had been reissued on 78rpm records in the 1930s. His real name was Martin Lanfried; he was one of the original buglers from the 1854 Battle of Balaclava. The recording segues into "Translucent Carriages", one of the band's most enduring songs which Rapp subsequently performed, both with the band and as a soloist, including at the Terrastock 6 Festival in 2006. Simply performed with acoustic guitar, it contains breathing noises and whispered lines of commentary, including a quote from the ancient Greek historian Herodotus: "In peace, sons bury their fathers/ in war, fathers bury their sons."

"Images of April", in contrast, is an evocation of nature, featuring dubbed bird songs throughout. After "There Was A Man", a simpler story-based folk song, "I Saw The World" has become another highlight in the band's career. Its heartfelt lyrics were written by a 21-year-old Rapp, with such examples such as "I saw the world spinning like a toy, hate seems so small compared to it all, so why don’t you do joy?" The sound is supplemented by overdubs of natural sound recordings, including waves as well as wind chimes, and by a lush string arrangement by Warren Smith. "Guardian Angels" is a ballad that was recorded with the intention to sound as if it was a scratchy 1920s 78 rpm record, and the illusion was taken further by a date attached to the title ("recorded in Guadelope, Mexico, in 1929…") on the sleeve.

The second side of the LP starts with a version of Leonard Cohen's "Suzanne", featuring a unique double bass marimba played by Warren Smith. This is followed by "Lepers and Roses", a complex ballad full of allegorical classical references, which was arranged by Al Schackman, best known as accompanist to Nina Simone, and also featured Joe Farrell on flute. After an archived recording of Florence Nightingale's voice, the final track, entitled "Ring Thing", is a dramatic musical evocation of Tolkien's The Lord of the Rings, complete with crashing gongs and a bagpipe chanter. According to Alderson: "The bagpipe player was told to play anything he wished and just walk around the studio playing. He was wearing his NYPD uniform pants during the overdub and was understandably confused. His performance was perfect." At the end, the sound of a tape spooling backwards through the album takes the listener back to "Trumpeter Landfrey", perhaps trying to convey a message that the cycle of war and confusion is destined to continue. Some of the reissues of Balaklava on CD have that section edited out; the 2018 CD on the Drag City label has it separately indexed under the title "Rewind".

== Release ==
The album repeated the band's critical success in the underground college scene of the late 1960s, and has subsequently been regularly rated the highest of all albums by either Rapp or the band. Following the album's release, Rapp backed out of his ESP contract and signed with Reprise Records. After seven further albums he retired from music in the mid-1970s, went back to school and became a successful civil rights lawyer for over three decades. He returned to perform and occasionally record in the mid-1990s.

== Reissues and cover versions ==
The original album has been reissued several times on compact disc since the 1980s. A restored version was issued on CD by Drag City Records in 2018.

The band Psychic TV covered "Translucent Carriages" on their 1984 album Pagan Day.

== Track listing ==
1. "Trumpeter Landfrey" – 0:35
2. "Translucent Carriages" – 4:00 (Wayne Harley/Tom Rapp)
3. "Images of April" – 2:44 (Rapp)
4. "There Was a Man" – 2:59 (Rapp)
5. "I Saw the World" – 3:28 (Rapp)
6. "Guardian Angels" – 3:02 (Rapp)
7. "Suzanne" – 5:01 (Leonard Cohen)
8. "Lepers and Roses" – 5:23 (Rapp)
9. "Florence Nightingale" – 0:17
10. "Ring Thing" – 2:20 [3:31 for the version including the tape effects at the end] (J.R.R. Tolkien/Rapp)

== Credits ==
- Tom Rapp – guitar, vocals, breathing
- Jim Bohannon – organ, piano, clavinette, marimba
- Wayne Harley – banjo, harmony
- Lane Lederer – bass, guitar, swinehorn
- Guest artists:-
  - Joe Farrell – flute, English horn (tracks 3, 7)
  - Lee Crabtree – piano, organ, flute (tracks 5, 8)
  - Bill Salter – bass (tracks 5, 7, 8, 10)
  - Al Schackman – guitar (track 8)
  - Warren Smith – string arrangements (track 5), percussion
  - Selwart Clarke – string arrangements (track 6)
- Arielvaced out of Onlyville by Richard L. Alderson, Impact Sound, N.Y.C.
- We wish to dedicate this album to Pvt. Edward D. Slovik, U.S. Army, deceased
