= Beautiful Lies You Could Live In =

Studio album by Tom Rapp/Pearls Before Swine
- Released: November 1971
- Genres: Folk rock, country rock
- Length: 32:34
- Label: Reprise RS 6467
- Producer: Peter H. Edmiston

Tom Rapp/Pearls Before Swine chronology
City of Gold (1971)	Beautiful Lies You Could Live In (1971)	Familiar Songs (1972)

Professional ratings
Review scores
Source	Rating
AllMusic	4/5 stars

... Beautiful Lies You Could Live In was the sixth album credited to American psychedelic folk group Pearls Before Swine, and their fourth on Reprise Records. It was released in 1971.

Like its predecessor City of Gold, the album was credited to Tom Rapp and Pearls Before Swine, rather than solely in the group's name. By this time, Rapp was usually recording as, in effect, a solo singer-songwriter, supported by his wife Elisabeth and by session musicians. However, the move towards presenting Rapp as a solo artist happened at the same time as the group Pearls Before Swine - which, since its formation in 1965, had never previously appeared live - was beginning its first concert tour in 1971. The other members of the 1971 touring band - Mike Krawitz (piano), Gordon Hayes (bass) and Jon Tooker (guitar) - all played on Beautiful Lies, but were not specifically differentiated as band members from the session musicians. The sessions took place in New York and Woodstock, presumably in early 1971, and featured musicians of the calibre of Amos Garrett (guitar), Bob Dorough (piano), and Billy Mundi (drums).

The album has a more orthodox folk rock (or country rock) sound than earlier Pearls Before Swine records, with electric guitars and drums more prominent. It also contains several of Tom Rapp's most beautiful and evocative songs, such as "Snow Queen", "Island Lady", and "Freedom", together with a cover of Leonard Cohen's "Bird On A Wire". The album concludes with a brief setting of A. E. Housman's poem, "Epitaph on an Army of Mercenaries", sung by Elisabeth.

Reverting to the group's practice of using classic art images on their album covers, the sleeve design shows the 19th century Pre-Raphaelite painting "Ophelia" by John Everett Millais.

Beautiful Lies was in effect the last album recorded by Rapp for the Reprise label, although a further album, Familiar Songs, was issued by the company without Rapp's knowledge or approval. Beautiful Lies was issued on CD in 2003 as part of the Jewels Were the Stars compendium of Pearls Before Swine's first four Reprise albums.

== Track listing ==
1. "Snow Queen" - 4:00 (Rapp)
2. "A Life" - 2:57 (Rapp)
3. "Butterflies" - 2:46 (Rapp)
4. "Simple Things" - 2:55 (Rapp)
5. "Everybody's Got Pain" - 2:47 (Rapp)
6. "Bird On A Wire" - 3:33 (Cohen)
7. "Island Lady" - 4:01 (Rapp)
8. "Come To Me" - 2:57 (Rapp)
9. "Freedom" - 3:03 (Rapp)
10. "She's Gone" - 2:11 (Rapp)
11. "Epitaph" - 1:24 (Housman / Elisabeth Rapp)

== Performers ==
- Tom Rapp: Vocals, Guitar
- Morrie E. Brown: Bass
- Steve Alan Grable: Piano, Organ
- Jon Tooker: Guitar
- Elisabeth (Rapp): Vocals
- Gordon Hayes: Bass
- Michael Krawitz: Piano
- Billy Mundi: Drums
- Bob Dorough: Piano
- Stu Scharf: Electric guitar
- Grady Tate: Drums
- Amos Garrett: Electric guitar
- Herbie Lovelle: Drums
- Jerry Jemmott: Bass

=== Other credits ===
- Produced by Peter H. Edmiston
- Executive Producer : Charles R. Rothschild
- Recorded at A&R Studios, New York; Aura Sound, New York; and Bearsville Studios, Woodstock
- Engineered by Mark Harman
