= John Yang (photographer) =

American photographer, architect (1933–2009)

- Born: April 16, 1933; Suzhou, Jiangsu, China
- Died: September 28, 2009 (aged 76)
- Education: California School of Fine Arts; Harvard College (BA); University of Pennsylvania (MA)
- Occupations: Photographer; architect
- Known for: Landscape photography
- Spouse: Linda Gureasko (m. 1960–2009; his death)
- Children: 2, Naomi, David
- Website: www.johnyangphoto.com

John Yang (April 16, 1933 – September 28, 2009) was an American photographer, and architect. He was known for his landscape photographs.

== Early life, family and education ==
John Yang was born on April 16, 1933 in China, he settled in the United States with his family in 1939. His interest in photography began as a child and was later developed when he was a student at The Putney School a private high school in Vermont where he was classmates with other future photographers such as Tim Asch.

In the summer of 1951, he studied with Minor White at the California School of Fine Arts. He graduated from Harvard College with a BA degree in 1954 majoring in philosophy, and from the University of Pennsylvania he received a MA degree in architecture in 1957 studying under Louis Kahn.

In 1960 in Istanbul, he married his architecture classmate from the University of Pennsylvania, Linda Gureasko. Together they had two children. Yang's daughter is the Naomi Yang (born 1964), a musician, photographer, and filmmaker; and his son is David Yang (born 1967) is a violist and the director of Chamber Music at the University of Pennsylvania.

== Career ==
Before becoming a photographer full-time, Yang worked as an architect and continued in that practice until 1978.

One of his photographs, "Blindman's Bluff", that was taken at Strasbourg, France in 1960, was edited and used by the band Sigur Ros for their 2002 album ( ).

The John Yang Archive is at the Center for Creative Photography at the University of Arizona.
