= Blue Thumb Records =

American record label

- Parent company: Universal Music Group
- Founded: 1968
- Founder: Bob Krasnow; Tommy LiPuma; Don Graham
- Status: Defunct
- Distributors: Hip-O Records (re-issues)
- Genre: Various
- Country of origin: United States

Blue Thumb Records was an American record label founded in 1968 by Bob Krasnow and former A&M Records executives Tommy LiPuma and Don Graham. Blue Thumb's last record was released in 1978. In 1995, the label was revived and remained active until 2005.

== History ==
Bob Krasnow had been in the record business since the 1950s, working as a promotion man for King Records and also working for Buddah/Kama Sutra Records. Blue Thumb was originally intended by Captain Beefheart to be the name of his backing band. However, Krasnow did not think the name was right for the group. Later Krasnow chose the name for his label.

Other acts that appeared on the label include Phil Upchurch, The Crusaders, The Pointer Sisters, Jimmy Smith, Hugh Masekela, Ben Sidran, Last Poets, Gerry Rafferty, Aynsley Dunbar's Retaliation (licensed from UK Liberty Records), Dan Hicks and His Hot Licks, Dave Mason, T. Rex (in its earlier incarnation as Tyrannosaurus Rex, licensed from the UK's Regal Zonophone Records), Ike & Tina Turner, Love, Gábor Szabó, Mark-Almond, Buddy Guy, Junior Mance, Junior Wells, Sam Lay, Sylvester, The Credibility Gap, and National Lampoon (on the Banana label imprint).

Blue Thumb originally used independent distribution, but went to Capitol/EMI for distribution in late 1970. Gulf and Western's Famous Music Group took over distribution in mid-1971, then bought the label outright in 1972. Late in 1974, the Famous Music record labels were sold to ABC Records. ABC kept Blue Thumb active for a time, mostly for albums by the Pointer Sisters and the Crusaders as well as some reissues. In 1979 ABC sold its labels to MCA Records, which discontinued the Blue Thumb imprint altogether.

In the United Kingdom and Europe, Blue Thumb releases were licensed to Harvest Records (also owned by EMI) from 1969 to 1971, and to Island Records thereafter. In 1995, an anthology CD was released, All Day Thumbsucker Revisited: The History of Blue Thumb Records, consisting of recordings from various artists from 1968 to 1974.

The label was revived in 1995 for blues and soft rock releases. This remained so, even after the 1998 merger with parent Universal Music Group and PolyGram and being put under the fold of the Verve Music Group, continuing to be Verve's imprint for non-jazz releases. In early 2005, the Blue Thumb imprint was deactivated and was replaced with Verve Forecast to handle such releases. UMG's reissue arm Hip-O Records has reissued several Blue Thumb recordings, including such acts as the Crusaders, Dan Hicks & his Hot Licks and the Pointer Sisters.

== Catalog ==
Catalog	Year	Album	Artist	Notes
BTS 1	1968	Strictly Personal	Captain Beefheart & His Magic Band	Beefheart was going to name his band “Blue Thumb” but Krasnow felt it worked better as a label name
BTS 2	1968	An Album of Political Pornography	Lew Irwin & The Credibility Gap	
BTS 3	1968	Original and Authentic Recordings by the Great W.C. Fields	W.C. Fields	
BTS 4	1968	The Aynsley Dunbar Retaliation	Aynsley Dunbar Retaliation	
BTS 5	1969	Outta Season	Ike & Tina Turner	
BTS 6	1969	Doctor Dunbar's Prescription	Aynsley Dunbar Retaliation	
BTS 7	1969	Unicorn	Tyrannosaurus Rex	
BTS 8	1969	Truckin' with Albert Collins	Albert Collins	Reissue of The Cool Sounds of Albert Collins (TCF Hall, 1965)
BTS 9	1970	Coming Home	Chicago Blue Stars	Personnel includes Charlie Musselwhite, Fred Roulette, Louis Myers, Skip Rose, Jack Myers and Fred Below
BTS 10	1969	Venus in Cancer	Robbie Basho	
BTS 11	1969	The Hunter	Ike & Tina Turner	
BTS 12	1969	Sweet Black Angel	Earl Hooker	
BTS 13	1969	Ready to Ride	Southwind	
BTS 14	1969	Sam Lay in Bluesland	Sam Lay's Bluesband	
BTS 15	1969	Clifton Chenier's Very Best	Clifton Chenier	Compilation of Arhoolie 1024/1031/1038
BTS 16	1970	To Mum From Aynsley and the Boys	Aynsley Dunbar Retaliation	
BTS 17	1969	Alegria!	Bossa Rio	
BTS 18	1970	A Beard of Stars	Tyrannosaurus Rex	
BTS 19	1970	Alone Together	Dave Mason	On multi-colored vinyl
BTS 20	1970	Buddy and the Juniors	Buddy Guy, Junior Mance & Junior Wells	
BTS 21	1970	A Bad Donato	João Donato	
BTS 22	1970	False Start	Love	
BTS 23	1970	Magical Connection	Gábor Szabó	
BTS 24				
BTS 25	1971	Dave Mason & Cass Elliot	Dave Mason and Cass Elliot	
BTS 26	1970	What a Place to Land	Southwind	
BTS 27	1971	Mark-Almond	Mark-Almond	
BTS 28	1971	High Contrast	Gábor Szabó	featuring Bobby Womack
BTS 29	1971	Where's the Money?	Dan Hicks & His Hot Licks	
BTS 30	1971	Recorded Live at Bimbo's, San Francisco	Charles Pierce	
BTS 31	1971	Naturally	Jessie Hill	
BTS 32	1972	Mark-Almond II	Mark-Almond	
BTS 33	1971	How Are Things in Your Town?	Ken Nordine	2LP Compilation of material previously released on Dot Records
BTS 34	1972	Headkeeper	Dave Mason	
BTS 35	1972	Crazed Hipsters	Finningan & Wood	
BTS 36	1972	Striking It Rich	Dan Hicks & His Hot Licks	
BTS 37	1972	Luis Gasca	Luis Gasca	aka For Those Who Chant
Banana BTS 38	1972	Radio Dinner	National Lampoon	
BTS 39	1972	Chastisement	The Last Poets	
BTS 40	1972	I Lead a Life	Ben Sidran	
BTS 41	1973	Space Is the Place	Sun Ra	Released as a quadraphonic LP only, and 8-track
BTS 42	1972	The Barbeque of Deville	Hoodoo Rhythm Devils	
BTS 43	1972	Private Tonight	Arthur Adams	
BTS 44	1972	Stardancer	Tom Rapp	
BTS 45	1973	Sylvester and the Hot Band	Sylvester and the Hot Band	
BTS 46	1973	Singing/Playing	Larry Carlton	
BTS 47	1973	Supermellow	Paul Humphrey	
BTS 48	1973	The Pointer Sisters	The Pointer Sisters	
BTS 49	1973	The Best of Ike & Tina Turner	Ike & Tina Turner	Compilation
BTS 50	1973	The Best of Mark-Almond	Mark-Almond	Compilation
BTS 51	1973	Last Train to Hicksville... The Home of Happy Feet	Dan Hicks & His Hot Licks	
BTS 52	1973	At Last	The Last Poets	
BTS 53				
BTS 54	1973	Dave Mason is Alive!	Dave Mason	
BTS 55	1973	Puttin' in Time on Planet Earth	Ben Sidran	
BTS 56	1973	Sunforest	Tom Rapp / Pearls Before Swine	
BTS 57	1973	What the Kids Want	Hoodoo Rhythm Devils	
BTS 58	1973	Can I Have My Money Back?	Gerry Rafferty	Reissue of Transatlantic Records album
BTS 59	1973	Lovin' Feelin'	Phil Upchurch	
BTS 60	1973	Bazaar	Sylvester & The Hot Band	
BTS 61	1973	Face to Face	Evan Pace	Arranged by Barry White and Gene Page, produced by White.
BTS 62	1972	Introducing Hedzoleh Soundz	Hugh Masekela	
BTS 63	1973	Butts Band	Butts Band	Featuring Robby Krieger and John Densmore
BTS 64	1974	Aim for the Highest	Aim	
BTS 65				
BTS 66	1974	America, Wake Up	Paul Humphrey	
BTS 880	1975	Split Coconut	Dave Mason	
BTS 6000	1969	Memphis Swamp Jam	Various Artists	Featuring Bukka White, Piano Red, Nathan Beauregard, Sleepy John Estes, Fred McDowell & Johnny Woods, Furry Lewis, R.L. Watson & Josiah Jones
BTS 6001	1972	Crusaders 1	The Crusaders	Two record set
BTS 6002				
BTS 6003	1973	Home Is Where the Music Is	Hugh Masekela	Two record set
BTS 6004	1972	Lights Out: San Francisco (Voco Presents The Soul Of The Bay Area)	Various Artists	Two record set featuring John Lee Hooker, Clifford Coulter, Tower Of Power, Sylvester and The Hot Band, Fadil Shahin and The Casbah Band, Dan Hicks and His Hot Licks
BTS 6005	1972	Darkess Darkness	Phil Upchurch	
Banana BTS 6006	1973	Lemmings	National Lampoon	
BTS 6007	1973	Unsung Heroes	The Crusaders	
Banana BTS 6008	1974	The Missing White House Tapes	National Lampoon	
BTS 6009	1974	That's a Plenty	The Pointer Sisters	
BTS 6010	1974	Scratch	The Crusaders	
BTS 6011	1974	Italian Graffiti	Nick DeCaro	
BTS 6012	1974	Don't Let Go	Ben Sidran	
BTS 6013	1974	The Best of Dave Mason	Dave Mason	
BTS 6014	1974	Gabor Szabo Live	Gábor Szabó	
BTS 6015	1974	I Am Not Afraid	Hugh Masekela	
BTS 6016	1974	The Big Bow-Wow Strain	Ken Burgan	
BTS 6017				
BTSD 6018	1975	Hear and Now	Butts Band	
BTSD 6019	1975	New Year, New Band, New Company	John Mayall	
BTSD 6020				
BTSD 6021	1975	Steppin'	The Pointer Sisters	
BTSD 6022	1975	Chain Reaction	The Crusaders	
BTSD 6023	1977	Having a Party	The Pointer Sisters	
BTSD 6024	1976	Those Southern Knights	The Crusaders	
BTSD 6025				
BTSY 6026/2	1976	The Best of the Pointer Sisters	The Pointer Sisters	Two record set
BTS 6027	1976	The Best of the Crusaders	The Crusaders	Two record set
BTS 6028	1977	Come Into Knowledge	RAMP	
BT 6029	1977	Free as the Wind	The Crusaders	
BT 6030	1978	Images	The Crusaders	
BT 6031	1978	Can I Have My Money Back?	Gerry Rafferty	Reissue of BTS 58
BT 6032	1978	Very Best of Dave Mason	Dave Mason	
BTS 7000	1973	The 2nd Crusade	The Crusaders	Two record set
BTS 7001				
BT3 7002	1995	All Day Thumb Sucker Revisited: The History of Blue Thumb Records	Various Artists	Three record set label sampler – despite the title, this release shares no tracks with the 1970 original
BTS 8001				
BTS 8002	1974	Live at the Opera House	The Pointer Sisters	
BTS 8701				
BTS 8702	1970	All Day Thumb Sucker	Various Artists	Label sampler
BTS 8703				
BTS 8704				
BTS 8705				
BTS 8706	1971	Memphis Swamp Jam	Various Artists	Reissue of BTS 6000
BTS 8805	1971	Outta Season	Ike & Tina Turner	Reissue of BTS 5
BTS 8813	1971	Ready to Ride	Southwind	Reissue of BTS 13
BTS 8817	1971	Alegria!	Bossa Rio	Reissue of BTS 17
BTS 8818	1971	A Beard of Stars	Tyrannosaurus Rex	Reissue of BTS 18
BTS 8819	1971	Alone Together	Dave Mason	Reissue of BTS 19 on standard black vinyl
BTS 8820	1971	Buddy and the Juniors	Buddy Guy, Junior Mance & Junior Wells	Reissue of BTS 20
BTS 9000	1969	Out Here	Love	Two record set
BTS 9001	1972	Lenny	Lenny Bruce	Two record set
BT 9002	1974	Southern Comfort	The Crusaders	Two record set

== See also ==
- List of record labels
- Verve Records
