= These Things Too =

Studio album by Pearls Before Swine
- Released: September 1969
- Recorded: 1969
- Studio: Impact Sound, New York
- Genre: Psychedelic folk, folk rock
- Length: 40:44
- Label: Reprise
- Producer: Richard Alderson, Jim Fairs

Pearls Before Swine chronology
| Balaklava (1968) | These Things Too (1969) | The Use of Ashes (1970) |

Professional ratings
Review scores
| Source | Rating |
|---|---|
| Allmusic | 2.5/5 stars |

These Things Too is the third album by American psychedelic folk group Pearls Before Swine, and their first for Reprise Records. It was released in 1969.

By early 1969, the original line-up of Pearls Before Swine - which had only ever performed in the studio, never live - was disintegrating around its leader and mainstay, singer and songwriter Tom Rapp. Original members Lane Lederer and Roger Crissinger had left, and Rapp had married Dutch traveller Elisabeth Joosten, whom he had met in New York when recording the album Balaklava. Original member Wayne Harley remained in the group, but left shortly after These Things Too was recorded.

The group had now left ESP-Disk and joined Reprise, a major label, and Rapp and producer Richard Alderson recruited studio musicians to play on the album. Chief among these was Jim Fairs, formerly of garage band The Cryan' Shames, who acted as co-producer and arranger as well as musician. Other musicians included violinist Richard Greene, later of Seatrain, and jazz drummer Grady Tate.

These Things Too has been described as Rapp's "dreamy" album, and it is generally less well regarded by critics than the albums which immediately preceded and followed it, Balaklava (1968) and The Use of Ashes (1970). Rapp stated that it was the first Pearls Before Swine album which reflected drug use in the writing of the songs.

The album sleeve showed a 15th-century painting of Christ by Giovanni Bellini. The picture was removed from the version of the album issued in Germany because it showed Christ's nipple exposed.

The album was reissued on CD in 2003, originally as part of a box set, Jewels Were The Stars, which comprised the group's four completed Reprise albums. It was again reissued, with The Use of Ashes, as a two-on-one CD by Floating World Records in 2011.

== Track listing ==
1. "Footnote" – 1:18 (Rapp / Auden)
2. "Sail Away" – 3:06 (Rapp)
3. "Look Into Her Eyes" – 4:36 (Rapp)
4. "I Shall Be Released" – 3:03 (Dylan)
5. "Frog In The Window (reprise)" – 2:31 (Rapp)
6. "I'm Going To City" – 2:30 (Rapp)
7. "Man In The Tree" – 3:30 (Rapp)
8. "If You Don't Want To (I Don't Mind)" – 3:14 (Rapp)
9. "Green And Blue" – 0:21 (Rapp / Elisabeth)
10. "Mon Amour" – 2:07 (Rapp / Elisabeth)
11. "Wizard of Is" – 3:35 (Rapp)
12. "Frog in the Window" – 2:42 (Rapp)
13. "When I Was a Child" – 4:46 (Rapp)
14. "These Things Too" – 3:25 (Rapp)

== Musicians ==
=== Pearls Before Swine ===
- Tom Rapp: Vocals, Guitar
- Wayne Harley: Banjo, Harmony
- Elisabeth: Vocals
- Jim Fairs: Guitar, Harmony, Celeste

=== Other musicians ===
- Bill Salter: Bass
- Grady Tate: Drums
- Richard Greene: Electric Violin

== Other credits ==
- Recorded at Impact Sound, New York, by Richard Alderson and Danford Griffiths
- Mixed at A&R Recording, New York, by Steve Friedman
- Arranged by Bill Eaton, Jim Fairs and the Pearls
- This album is dedicated to Elisabeth
