= Today (Galaxie 500 album) =

Studio album by Galaxie 500
- Released: 1988
- Recorded: July 1988
- Studio: Noise New York
- Genres: Dream pop; slowcore
- Length: 36:14
- Label: Aurora
- Producer: Mark Kramer

Galaxie 500 chronology
Today (1988)	On Fire (1989)

Singles from Today
- 1. "Tugboat" / "King of Spain" Released: May 1988

Today is the debut studio album by the American indie rock band Galaxie 500. It was released in 1988 on Aurora Records.

In 2010, the album was re-issued and peaked at number 16 on the UK Independent Album Breakers Chart.

== Critical reception ==
Professional ratings
Review scores
Source	Rating
AllMusic	4/5 stars
Drowned in Sound	8/10
The Guardian	5/5 stars
Mojo	4/5 stars
NME	8/10
Pitchfork	9.5/10
Record Collector	4/5 stars
The Rolling Stone Album Guide	3/5 stars
Spin Alternative Record Guide	7/10
The Village Voice	B+

In 2018, Pitchfork ranked it at number 16 on its "The 30 Best Dream Pop Albums" list.

== Track listing ==
All tracks are written by Galaxie 500, except where noted.

No.	Title	Writer(s)	Length
1.	"Flowers"		4:26
2.	"Pictures"		3:23
3.	"Parking Lot"		2:52
4.	"Don't Let Our Youth Go to Waste"	Jonathan Richman	6:47
5.	"Temperature's Rising"		5:05
6.	"Oblivious"		3:18
7.	"It's Getting Late"		3:29
8.	"Instrumental"		3:01
9.	"Tugboat"		3:53
Total length:			36:14

1989 CD reissue German edition bonus tracks
No.	Title	Length
10.	"King of Spain"	4:33
11.	"Crazy"	1:55
Total length:		42:42

1991 / 1997 CD reissue US edition bonus track
No.	Title	Length
10.	"King of Spain"	4:33
Total length:		40:47

== Personnel ==
Credits adapted from liner notes.

Galaxie 500

- Damon Krukowski – drums
- Dean Wareham – guitar, vocals
- Naomi Yang – bass guitar

Additional personnel

- Mark Kramer – production, engineering
- Marc Alghini – executive production
- Eugène Atget – cover photograph

== Charts ==
Chart (2010)	Peak position
UK Independent Album Breakers (OCC)	16

== Release history ==
Year	Label	Format	Catalog	Region
1988	Aurora	LP	002	US
1989	Schemer	CD	8905	Germany
1991	Rough Trade US	CD	R266	US
1991	Rough Trade US	LP	R266	US
1994	Rockville	cassette	6082	US
1997	Rykodisc	enhanced CD	10356	US
2009	20/20/20	LP, CD	202020.07	US
