= Copenhagen (album) =

Live album by Galaxie 500
- Released: April 29, 1997
- Recorded: December 1, 1990
- Genres: Dream pop; slowcore
- Length: 53:17
- Label: Rykodisc
- Producer: Kramer

Galaxie 500 chronology
This Is Our Music (1990)	Copenhagen (1997)	The Portable Galaxie 500 (1998)

Professional ratings
Review scores
Source	Rating
AllMusic	4/5 stars
Entertainment Weekly	B−
NME	8/10

Copenhagen is a live album by Galaxie 500. It was recorded in Copenhagen at the music venue Barbue, which was then a part of the culture centre Huset KBH on December 1, 1990, the final date of their last European tour. The recording was originally made by the Danish Broadcasting Corporation for the radio. Galaxie 500's producer Kramer were travelling with the band on tour and handled live sound engineering.

== Track listing ==
All tracks are written by Galaxie 500, except as noted.

No.	Title	Writer(s)	Length
1.	"Decomposing Trees"		4:50
2.	"Fourth of July"		5:01
3.	"Summertime"		6:42
4.	"Sorry"		4:30
5.	"When Will You Come Home"		5:31
6.	"Spook"		4:54
7.	"Listen, the Snow Is Falling"	Yoko Ono	8:19
8.	"Here She Comes Now"	The Velvet Underground	5:38
9.	"Don't Let Our Youth Go to Waste"	Jonathan Richman	7:52
Total length:			53:17

== Releases ==
Year	Label	Format	Catalog no.	Country
1997	Rykodisc	CD	10373	US
