= The Use of Ashes =

Studio album by Pearls Before Swine
- Released: August 1970
- Recorded: March 1970; Impact Sound, NY and Woodland Studios, Nashville, TN
- Genre: Psychedelic rock, folk rock
- Length: 32:06
- Label: Reprise RS 6405
- Producer: Peter H. Edmiston

Pearls Before Swine chronology
| These Things Too (1969) | The Use of Ashes (1970) | City of Gold (1971) |

Professional ratings
Review scores
| Source | Rating |
|---|---|
| Allmusic | 4/5 stars |

The Use of Ashes was the fourth album made by American psychedelic folk group Pearls Before Swine, and the second on Reprise Records after their move from ESP-Disk.

== Background ==
After recording the 1969 album These Things Too, the other original founding members of Pearls Before Swine had all left, and leader Tom Rapp and his then wife Elisabeth moved to her home country of the Netherlands (travelling on the maiden voyage of the QE2 liner) to live for several months near Utrecht. Most of the songs on The Use Of Ashes were written there. They were recorded back in Nashville in March 1970, with some of the city's top session musicians, many of whom formed the basis of the band Area Code 615.

== Recording summary ==
Many of Rapp's admirers regard this, and particularly the first side of the original LP (tracks 1 through 5), as the finest and most consistent of all his albums. The opening track, "The Jeweler", with its refrain of "He knows the use of ashes / He worships God with ashes", came to him when he saw his wife cleaning a piece of jewelry with a paste made from ashes, and is generally regarded as one of his finest and most poetic songs. A version was later recorded by This Mortal Coil. The next track, "From the Movie of the Same Name" is largely instrumental, featuring David Briggs' harpsichord and, like all the tracks, is beautifully and sensitively arranged. "Rocket Man" is based on the Ray Bradbury story "The Rocket Man" (in his book "The Illustrated Man") about an astronaut and father burning up in space, but also draws on Rapp's difficult relationship with his own father and the fact that, in his teens, he lived near Cape Canaveral in Florida. Irish singer-songwriter Pierce Turner recorded the song for his 2022 album Terrible Good. The song itself inspired Bernie Taupin's lyrics on Elton John's hit of the same title. Another highlight, "Song About A Rose", again shows Rapp's ability to convey metaphysical thoughts within an artfully arranged song, with the lyrics "And even God can only guess why or where or when or if the answers all belong / And you and I we sing our song about a rose / Or perhaps the shadow of a rose".

A different texture is provided by the jazzy "Tell Me Why," shimmering with vibraphone beneath Rapp's whimsical lines. The song "Riegal" was inspired by reading a newspaper article on the wartime sinking of a prison ship, the MS Rigel, when up to 4,000 prisoners drowned. Later histories suggest the number may have been out by 1,000 odd souls, but the sinking remains one of the worst maritime disasters ever and the song is an evocation of the perils of going down to the sea in ships. Rapp does not apportion blame, indeed the lyric gives credit to the German, but probably not Nazi, captain who apparently saved many lives by grounding his ship. Rapp's juxtaposition of stark imagery reveals that while Pearls Before Swine might not have continued the more bombastic direction set about on their earlier protest songs "Uncle John" or "Drop Out," they maintained social and political relevance. The final track, "When The War Began", contains an equally potent message on the futility of war.

A single, "The Jeweler" / "Rocket Man" (Reprise 0949), was issued from the album. Additional material from the Nashville sessions was released on the next Pearls Before Swine album, City of Gold.

== Design ==
The sleeve design shows a late 15th-century French or Flemish tapestry, "The Hunt of the Unicorn: vi, The unicorn is brought to the castle", from the Metropolitan Museum of Art. It shows three huntsmen bringing down a unicorn with spears and swords. The sleeve continued the group's approach of using classic art on their album covers, started with their debut album One Nation Underground.

== Reissues ==
In 2003 The Use of Ashes was issued on compact disc as part of the Jewels Were the Stars compendium, anthologizing Pearls Before Swine's Reprise Records output. It was again reissued, with These Things Too, as a two-on-one CD by Floating World Records in 2011.

== Influence ==
A Dutch group formed in 1988 out of the rock band Mekanik Commando took the name "The Use of Ashes", inspired directly by the Pearls Before Swine album.

== Track listing ==
1. The Jeweler (2:48)
2. From the Movie of the Same Name (2:21)
3. Rocket Man (3:06) ("based on a short story by Ray Bradbury")
4. God Save The Child (3:08) ("Elisabeth helped")
5. Song About A Rose (2:21)
6. Tell Me Why (3:43)
7. Margery (3:03)
8. The Old Man (3:16)
9. Riegal (3:13)
10. When the War Began (5:07)

All words and music by Tom Rapp

== Performers ==
- Tom Rapp: Vocals, Guitar
- Elisabeth (Joosten): Vocals
- Charlie McCoy: Dobro, Guitar, Bass, Harmonica
- Norbert Putnam: Bass
- Kenneth Buttrey: Drums
- Buddy Spicher: Violin, Cello, Viola
- Mac Gayden: Guitars
- David Briggs: Piano, Harpsichord
- John Duke: Oboe, Flute
- Hutch Davie: Keyboard
- Bill Pippin: Oboe, Flute

=== Other credits ===
- Engineer: Rick Horton
- Mixing engineer: Brooks Arthur
- Producer: Peter H. Edmiston
- Executive Producer: Charles R. Rothschild
- Art Direction: Ed Thrasher
- Special thanks to Jon Tooker
- Recorded at Woodland Studios, Nashville, 3 days in March 1970
- This album is dedicated to the Netherlands where most of the songs were written
