= Stop Me If You Think You've Heard This One Before... =

Compilation album by various artists
- Released: November 2003
- Genre: Indie rock, alternative rock
- Length: 57:55
- Label: Rough Trade

Stop Me If You Think You've Heard This One Before... is a compilation of Rough Trade's artists covering classics from the label's back-catalogue. It was released to celebrate the 25th anniversary of the legendary indie label, in late 2003. A limited edition 7" split single featuring "Ride It On" by Delays and "Lions After Slumber" by The Veils was released to promote the album.

== Track listing ==
1. "Fa Ce La" – 2:22 (Eastern Lane, originally by The Feelies)
2. "Eating Noddemix" – 2:08 (Adam Green, originally by Young Marble Giants)
3. "We Could Send Letters" – 5:25 (Mystic Chords of Memory, originally by Aztec Camera)
4. "Jazz is the Teacher, Funk is the Preacher" – 3:39 (Oneida, originally by James Blood Ulmer)
5. "At Last I am Free" – 4:24 (Elizabeth Fraser, originally by Chic, covered on Rough Trade by Robert Wyatt in 1980)
6. "Dunes" – 3:38 (The Hidden Cameras, originally by The Clean)
7. "Tell Me" – 5:08 (The Tyde, originally by Galaxie 500)
8. "Is This It" – 3:01 (Royal City, originally by The Strokes)
9. "I Had a Little Boat" – 3:09 (Alasdair Roberts, originally by Ivor Cutler)
10. "Ride It On" – 3:28 (Delays, originally by Mazzy Star)
11. "Lions After Slumber" – 3:30 (The Veils, originally by Scritti Politti)
12. "Part-Time Punks" – 2:35 (Jeffrey Lewis, originally by The Television Personalities)
13. "Tugboat" – 6:48 (British Sea Power, originally by Galaxie 500)
14. "Last Nite" – 2:35 (The Detroit Cobras, originally by The Strokes)
15. "Winter" – 3:37 (The Fiery Furnaces, originally by The Fall)
16. "Final Day" – 2:18 (Belle & Sebastian, originally by Young Marble Giants)
