= Sunforest (album) =

Studio album by Tom Rapp/ Pearls Before Swine
- Released: 2 January 1973
- Genre: Folk rock, art rock
- Length: 36:43
- Label: Blue Thumb BTS-56
- Producer: Larry Butler, Peter H. Edmiston

Tom Rapp/ Pearls Before Swine chronology
Stardancer (1972)	Sunforest (1973)	A Journal of the Plague Year (1999)

Professional ratings
Review scores
Source	Rating
Allmusic	3/5 stars

Sunforest was the ninth album recorded by American singer-songwriter Tom Rapp (either with or without his group Pearls Before Swine), his second for Blue Thumb Records, and his final record before his lengthy retirement from the music industry after the mid-1970s.

Sunforest was released in 1973 and was credited to "Tom Rapp / Pearls Before Swine". Like its immediate predecessor, Stardancer, the album was recorded with members of the touring group Pearls Before Swine (Art Ellis and Bill Rollins), supplemented by a selection of prominent Nashville session musicians.

The content of the album, which is not generally regarded as one of his best, is very varied, but generally more upbeat than most of Rapp's work, with the up-tempo "Comin' Back" and "Someplace To Belong" almost rating as pop songs. "Love/Sex" is a riposte to Stephen Stills' "Love The One You're With", containing the line "Love will get you through times of no sex / Better than sex will get you through times of no love", while the title track "Sunforest" is an attempt at a traditional folk ballad. "Forbidden City" and "Blind River" show some jazz influences. "Sunshine & Charles" is one of Rapp's own favourite songs and contains the classic line: "She was 16 when she found Jesus / He was a Puerto Rican kid and he lived next door".

The sleeve design showed a cover painting of Rapp, and two small reproductions of paintings by Henri Rousseau were included on the back cover.

Sunforest was reissued on CD by Demon Records in 1998, and again by Lemon Records in the UK in 2009.

== Track listing ==
All tracks composed by Tom Rapp

1. "Comin' Back" - 2:59
2. "Prayers Of Action" - 3:05
3. "Forbidden City" - 2:51
4. "Love / Sex" - 4:04
5. "Harding Street" - 3:40
6. "Blind River" - 4:57
7. "Someplace To Belong" - 2:53
8. "Sunforest" - 6:19
9. "Sunshine & Charles" - 4:55

== Personnel ==
- Tom Rapp - vocals, guitar
- Art Ellis - flute, congas, vocals
- Bill Rollins - cello
- Steve McCord - guitar, musical advisor
- Jim Colvard - Dobro, guitar
- Charlie McCoy - bowed psaltery, harmonica, harp, organ
- Buzz Cason - vocals
- Diane Harris - vocals
- Charles Cochran - piano, string arrangements
- Buddy Spicher - electric viola, violin
- David Briggs - piano
- Mike Leech - bass, string arrangements
- Farrell Morris - percussion
- Bobby Wood - piano
- Reggie Young - piano
- Karl Himmel - drums, percussion
- Bobby Thompson - Dobro, guitar, banjo
- Kenny Buttrey - drums
- Bob Dorough - piano
- Bill Salter - bass
- Warren Smith - marimba

== Other credits ==
- Recorded at House of Cash, Quadrafonic Sound, Woodland Sound Studios, and Electric Lady
- Produced by Larry Butler and Peter H. Edmiston
- Engineers : Charlie Bragg, Gene Eichelberger, Rex Collier, Dick Shapiro
