= One Nation Underground (Pearls Before Swine album) =

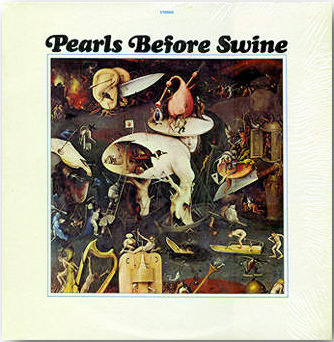

Studio album by Pearls Before Swine
- Released: July 1967
- Recorded: May 6–9, 1967, New York City
- Genres: Psychedelic folk, folk rock
- Length: 35:50
- Labels: ESP-Disk (original US release); Fontana (1969 UK & Netherlands release); Drag City (2017 reissue)
- Producer: Richard L. Alderson

Pearls Before Swine chronology
One Nation Underground (1967)	Balaklava (1968)

Professional ratings
Review scores
Source	Rating
Allmusic	4.5/5 stars

One Nation Underground is the debut album by American psychedelic folk group Pearls Before Swine. It was released on the ESP-Disk label in July 1967.

== Recording ==
It was recorded at Impact Sound in New York City, between May 6–9, 1967, by the Florida-based group, which at that point comprised main songwriter and singer Tom Rapp, Wayne Harley, Lane Lederer, and Roger Crissinger. Percussion was by session musician Warren Smith.

== Music ==
"Another Time" is an acoustic song, the first that Rapp ever wrote, based on his experience in a car crash where he walked away unscathed, and, with "Morning Song", represents the most characteristic example of Rapp's later writing style. In contrast, "Drop Out!" and "Uncle John" are youthful protest songs. "(Oh Dear) Miss Morse" spells out in Morse code the word F-U-C-K, accompanied by banjo and organ.

== Critical reception ==
The album became the most successful ESP release ever, estimated to have sold between 100,000 and 250,000 copies. Early vinyl copies came with a small poster of the Hell panel from Hieronymus Bosch's The Garden of Earthly Delights, a detail of which was used on the front of the album sleeve.

The album went through a number of cover variations. The original, first edition was brown monochrome with a white border along two sides of the cover. The second edition had a black and white cover with the group name in white along the top. The third edition was the white background and color section of the painting (see right).

The album presents a mixture of styles - "psychedelic folk reminiscent of Donovan collides with Farfisa-driven punk and hard-to-categorize repetitive minimalism, all thrown together with the undisciplined, creative exuberance of youth".

The album has been reissued numerous times on LP and CD, with various stereo mix variations. On October 20, 2017, Drag City - with the cooperation and participation of Tom Rapp and original engineer/producer Richard Alderson - released a "Fiftieth Anniversary Mono Restoration & Remastering" on CD and LP.

== Legacy ==
In May 2006, Spin magazine published an article with an editorial entitled "The Definitive Guide to Freak Folk", which cited Pearls Before Swine's One Nation Underground.

== Track listing ==
1. "Another Time" - 3:03 (Tom Rapp)
2. "Playmate" - 2:19 (Saxie Dowell)
3. "Ballad to an Amber Lady" - 5:14 (Roger Crissinger, Rapp)
4. "(Oh Dear) Miss Morse" - 1:54 (Rapp)
5. "Drop Out!" - 4:04 (Rapp)
6. "Morning Song" - 4:06 (Rapp)
7. "Regions of May" - 3:27 (Rapp)
8. "Uncle John" - 2:54 (Rapp)
9. "I Shall Not Care" - 5:20 (Sara Teasdale, Roman Tombs, Rapp)
10. "The Surrealist Waltz" - 3:29 (Lane Lederer, Crissinger)

== Personnel ==
Tom Rapp: Vocals, Guitar
Wayne Harley: Autoharp, Banjo, Mandolin, Vibraphone, Audio Oscillator, Harmony
Lane Lederer: Bass, Guitar, English Horn, Swinehorn, Sarangi, Celesta, Finger Cymbals, Vocals (on "Surrealist Waltz")
Roger Crissinger: Organ, Harpsichord, Clavioline
Warren Smith: Drums, Percussion
