= Pearls Before Swine (band) =

American psychedelic folk band

- Origin: Melbourne, Florida, United States
- Genres: Psychedelic folk, folk rock, psychedelic rock
- Years active: 1965–1974
- Labels: ESP-Disk, Fontana, Reprise, Blue Thumb, Drag City
- Past members: Tom Rapp; Wayne Harley; Lane Lederer; Roger Crissinger; Jim Bohannon; Jim Fairs; Elisabeth Joosten Rapp; Mike Krawitz; Gordon Hayes; Jon Tooker; Morrie Brown; Robby Merkin; David Wolfert; Art Ellis; Bill Rollins; Harry Orlove

Pearls Before Swine was an American folk rock band formed by Tom Rapp in 1965 in Eau Gallie, which is now part of Melbourne, Florida. They released six albums between 1967 and 1971, before Rapp launched a solo career.

== Early years, 1965–68 ==
With high school friends Wayne Harley (banjo, mandolin), Lane Lederer (bass, guitar) and Roger Crissinger (piano, organ), Rapp wrote and recorded some songs which, inspired by the Fugs, they sent to the avant-garde ESP-Disk label in New York. The group took its name from a Bible passage: "Give not that which is holy unto the dogs, neither cast ye your pearls before swine ...." (Mat. 7:6, KJV), meaning: do not give things of value to those who will not understand or appreciate them.

They were quickly signed, and recorded One Nation Underground (1967), featuring songs of mysticism, protest, melancholia, and some controversy in the case of "Miss Morse", which spelled "f-u-c-k" in Morse code. The album eventually sold around 200,000 copies, however label owner Bernard Stollman never granted the band any royalties, with Rapp stating, "We never got any money from ESP. Never, not even like a hundred dollars or something. My real sense is that he [Stollman] was abducted by aliens, and when he was probed it erased his memory of where all the money was".

The strongly anti-war-themed Balaklava (1968) followed, inspired by the Charge of the Light Brigade. Rapp has said "The first two albums are probably considered the druggiest, and I had never done any drugs at that point. I smoked Winston cigarettes at that time, so these are all Winston-induced hallucinations." The album covers featured paintings by Bosch and Brueghel, while the records themselves included interpretations of the writings of Tolkien and Herodotus as well as archive recordings from the 1890s, with innovatively arranged songs using an eclectic variety of instruments.

== Reprise period, 1969–72 ==
The band signed with Reprise Records in 1969, although by this time the other original members had left and the band name now referred to Rapp and whichever musicians he was recording or touring with, one of whom, Jim Fairs, was previously a member of The Cryan' Shames. The five albums on Reprise were generally more conventional in sound, but contained a unique blend of humanistic and mystical songs, with some whimsical touches. Some were recorded in New York and others – particularly The Use of Ashes and City of Gold – in Nashville with top session musicians including Charlie McCoy, Kenny Buttrey, and other members of Area Code 615. Several also featured Rapp's then-wife Elisabeth on vocals. The oddly upbeat "The Man", from City of Gold, was sung by David Noyes and recorded at A&R Studios in New York City during the summer of 1970. Noyes' friend Jon Tooker took his position when the band toured Europe that fall.

In his teens, Rapp lived close to Cape Canaveral and watched the rockets take off. The song "Rocket Man", on the album The Use of Ashes – written the day Neil Armstrong landed on the moon – was credited by Bernie Taupin with inspiring his hit song with Elton John of the same title: "We didn't steal that one from Bowie, we stole it from another guy, called Tom Rapp..." Many of the other songs of this period reflected Rapp's interests in mysticism, his relationship with his alcoholic father, and his experiences of living for a time in (and marrying a native of) the Netherlands. "Rocket Man" was based on a story by Ray Bradbury.

In 1971, Pearls Before Swine toured for the first time, the group then comprising Rapp, Mike Krawitz (piano), Gordon Hayes (bass) and Jon Tooker (guitar). Around this time, Rapp often referred onstage, not quite seriously, to the group as "the house band for the SDS." A live album from this period, Live Pearls, recorded at Yale University, was released as a download in December 2008. The final Reprise album, Familiar Songs, consisted of newly conceived, arranged, and produced recordings of some of Rapp's earlier songs, along with a few new and unreleased, featuring his then-current band, Morrie Brown (bass, guitar, mandolin and vocals), Robby Merkin (piano, organ, synth, bass and vocals), and David Wolfert (acoustic and electric guitar, 12-string, Dobro and vocals) along with drummer Billy Mundi, formerly of The Mothers Of Invention. Without Rapp's knowledge, the label released it not as a Pearls Before Swine album, but under his name alone.

== Later years ==
Two further albums followed, released under Rapp's own name on Blue Thumb Records. The first, Stardancer, was again recorded in Nashville, followed by Sunforest. The band—by that time comprising Rapp, Art Ellis (flute), Bill Rollins (bass, cello) and Harry Orlove (guitar, banjo)—toured until 1974, with Rapp from then performing solo until a final appearance in 1976 supporting Patti Smith.

After this, Rapp retired from music and, after graduating from Brandeis University, became a civil rights lawyer. After being contacted by the magazine Ptolemaic Terrascope, he re-appeared in 1997 at Terrastock, a music festival in Providence, Rhode Island, with his son's band, Shy Camp, and began recording again with 1999's A Journal of the Plague Year.

Tom Rapp appears on the Neil Young 2-CD tribute This Note's For You Too with the song "After the Gold Rush" on Inbetweens Records.

Original member Roger Crissinger left the group in 1968, joining San Francisco band One (1) led by Reality D. Blipcrotch. Lane Lederer is now a member of the Florida Orchestra.

Bass guitarist Morrie Brown became a record producer in R&B music. He was responsible for mentoring up-and-coming songwriters and producers Paul Laurence and Kashif. Brown collaborated with Kashif and Laurence on creating hit singles for B.T. Express and Evelyn "Champagne" King. Brown produced King's biggest hits—"I'm in Love", "Love Come Down" and "Betcha She Don't Love You"—as well as Howard Johnson's 1982 hit "So Fine". Since 1992, Brown has been the owner and founder of the printing software company PrintPoint.

Guitarist David Wolfert also became a record producer, as well as session musician. Wolfert worked on albums by Barbra Streisand, Don Covay, and the Four Tops, where he would produce the song "I Believe in You and Me" which would later be covered by Whitney Houston. Wolfert also produced the solo debut Out of Control for Kiss drummer Peter Criss. In recent years, Wolfert composed the music for the English language version of the anime Pokémon.

Jon Tooker died in a motorcycle crash in 2008. Art Ellis died on November 2, 2017. Tom Rapp died on February 11, 2018, after suffering from pelvic cancer.

Pearls Before Swine have been cited as a key influence by various musicians including The Dream Academy, Edgar Broughton, Damon and Naomi, the Bevis Frond, This Mortal Coil, and the Japanese band Ghost. Three tribute albums have been released by Secret Eye Records.

== Legacy ==
In May 2006, Spin magazine published an article with an editorial entitled "The Definitive Guide to Freak Folk", which cited Pearls Before Swine's One Nation Underground.

== Membership ==
- Tom Rapp (1965–74)
- Wayne Harley (1965–69)
- Lane Lederer (1965–68)
- Roger Crissinger (1965–67)
- Jim Bohannon (1968)
- Jim Fairs (1969)
- Elisabeth Joosten Rapp (1969–72)
- Mike Krawitz (1971)
- Gordon Hayes (1971)
- Jon Tooker (1971)
- Morrie Brown (1971)
- Robby Merkin (1971)
- David Wolfert (1971)
- Art Ellis (1971–74)
- Bill Rollins (1971–74)
- Harry Orlove (1971–74)

== Discography ==
=== Studio albums ===
- One Nation Underground (1967, ESP-Disk); 50th Anniversary re-issue (2017, Drag City)
- Balaklava (1968, ESP-Disk); 50th Anniversary re-issue (2018, Drag City)
- These Things Too (1969, Reprise)
- The Use of Ashes (1970, Reprise)
- City of Gold (1971, Reprise), (Thos. Rapp / Pearls Before Swine)
- Beautiful Lies You Could Live In (1971, Reprise) (Tom Rapp / Pearls Before Swine)
- Familiar Songs (1972, Reprise) (Tom Rapp)
- Stardancer (1972, Blue Thumb) (Tom Rapp)
- Sunforest (1973, Blue Thumb) (Tom Rapp / Pearls Before Swine)
- A Journal of the Plague Year (1999, Woronzow) (Tom Rapp)

=== Live albums ===
- Radio Pearls (recorded 1971, released 2006, ESP-Disk)
- Live Pearls (recorded 1971, released 2008, WildCat Recording download)
- Tom Rapp Live @ Yale U (2CD recorded 1973, released 2013, WildCat Recording download)
- PBS> Anderson Theater NYC '71 (recorded 1971, released 11/11/2016, Rox Vox)
- PBS&Tom Rapp Vinyl 7-inch 33 1/3 rpm 5-track EP> Discontinuity--Live Recordings 1972-3 & 1999 (released 2017, Sordide Sentimental)

=== Compilations ===
- Pimps Toe Accelerator EP (1993, Ptolemaic Terrascope Magazine POT 15) (3-artist vinyl 7-inch 33 1/3 rpm flexi-disc 5-track)
  - "Translucent Carriages" (alt. version)
  - "Macbeth"/"The Cowboy Who Ate Vietnam" (unreleased)
  - "Ring Thing" (alt. version)
- Constructive Melancholy (1999, Birdman) (CD compilation of 1969–72 Reprise tracks)
- Jewels Were The Stars (2003, Water) (4-CD box set of first four Reprise albums)
- The Wizard of Is (2004, Water) (2-CD collection of live recordings, outtakes etc.)
- The Complete ESP-Disk Recordings (2005, ESP-Disk and WildCat) (the two ESP albums on one CD)
- Hi-Five (2006, Rhino) (5-track EP, Reprise tracks)
- The Exaltation of Tom Rapp (2022, Fire) (vinyl LP, mostly of unreleased demo recordings)

=== Singles ===
- "Morning Song" / "Drop Out!" (1967, ESP-Disk)
- "I Saw The World" / "Images Of April" (1968, ESP-Disk)
- "These Things Too" / "If You Don't Want To" (1969, Reprise)
- "Suzanne" / "There Was a Man" (1969, Reprise)
- "The Jeweller" / "Rocket Man" (1970, Reprise)
- "Marshall" / "Why Should I Care?" (1972, Blue Thumb)
