= Richard Alderson (music producer) =

- Born: Richard Larm Alderson; February 10, 1937 (age 88); East Cleveland, Ohio, U.S.
- Genres: Audio engineer; record producer
- Years active: 1950s–present
- Website: richardaldersonaudio.com

Richard Larm Alderson (born February 10, 1937) is an American audio engineer and record producer, who has worked on recordings by Nina Simone, Bob Dylan, Harry Belafonte, Sun Ra, The Fugs, Pearls Before Swine, Roberta Flack, Grover Washington Jr. and others.

== Biography ==
Born in East Cleveland, Ohio, he grew up in New York City. After graduating he worked in record stores, and then selling and installing audio equipment, before being employed by inventor Sherman Fairchild as an audio engineer. He also began recording performers in folk clubs in New York, such as the Village Gate, working on the sound system in parallel with lighting engineer Chip Monck. His first commercially released live recordings were of Nina Simone, released on the albums Nina at the Village Gate (1962) and Nina Simone at Carnegie Hall (1963). He also recorded performances by Thelonious Monk, and early Bob Dylan performances eventually released many years later as Live at The Gaslight 1962. In 1962, he designed and built RLA Studios in New York, and the following year began working with Harry Belafonte on his live sound system. The studios later became Impact Studios after Belafonte took a financial share.

Albert Grossman then invited Alderson to produce the live sound for Dylan on his groundbreaking England and world tours in 1965–66 with The Band. In the same period, Alderson continued to engineer and then produce recordings in New York, for Fania Records artists such as Joe Bataan, as well as jazz sessions for Prestige Records. In the mid and late 1960s, he worked extensively for ESP-Disk Records, on artists such as Albert Ayler, Patty Waters, Sun Ra, The Fugs and Pearls Before Swine. Several incorporated Alderson's innovative use of musique concrète recordings, tape splicing and exotic percussion instruments. Other musicians with whom he worked in the 1960s included Muddy Waters, Spanky and Our Gang and The Last Poets, as well as gospel musicians.

In 1969, Alderson moved to Chiapas, Mexico, where he spent several years forming his own band and recording the indigenous music of the region, later released by Smithsonian Folkways. He returned to New York in 1975, and set up Rosebud Recording with Ralph MacDonald. While there, he oversaw recordings by Grover Washington Jr., Roberta Flack, Bill Withers and David Sanborn, among others.

From the 1980s, he continued to work as an engineer and consultant, setting up Alderson Acoustics and designing a variety of recording facilities in and around New York. He also worked on jingles and TV commercials, and on projects with producer and arranger Rob Mounsey. In 2010, Alderson was nominated for a Grammy in the Best Engineered Album, Non-Classical section, for singer-songwriter Leslie Mendelson's album Swan Feathers.
