= Galaxie 500 =

American rock band

- From left to right: Damon Krukowski, Naomi Yang, and Dean Wareham

Background information
- Origin: Cambridge, Massachusetts, U.S.
- Genres: Indie rock; dream pop; slowcore
- Years active: 1987–1991
- Labels: Aurora; Rough Trade; Rykodisc
- Spinoffs: Luna, Damon & Naomi, Dean & Britta, Magic Hour
- Past members: Dean Wareham; Damon Krukowski; Naomi Yang

Galaxie 500 was an American indie rock band that formed in 1987 and split up in 1991 after releasing three studio albums: Today (1988), On Fire (1989), and This Is Our Music (1990).

The band membership comprised guitarist and vocalist Dean Wareham, drummer Damon Krukowski, and bassist and vocalist Naomi Yang.

== History ==
=== Formation and early releases ===
Guitarist Dean Wareham, drummer Damon Krukowski and bassist Naomi Yang had met at the Dalton School in New York City in 1981, but began playing together during their time as students at Harvard University. Wareham and Krukowski had formed a series of punk-influenced student bands, before Wareham returned to New York. Back in Cambridge by 1987, he and Krukowski formed a new band, with Yang joining the group on bass guitar. The new group adopted the name Galaxie 500 after a friend's car, a Ford Galaxie 500.

The band played gigs in Boston and New York City, and recorded a demo which they sent to Shimmy Disc label boss and producer Mark Kramer, who agreed to produce the band. With Kramer at the controls, the band recorded the "Tugboat" single in February 1988, and the "Oblivious" flexi-disc, and then their debut album, Today, which was released on the small Aurora label. The band toured the United Kingdom in late 1988 and in 1989, then signed to Rough Trade and released their second album, On Fire, which has been described as "lo-fi psychedelia reminiscent of Jonathan Richman being backed by The Velvet Underground", and is considered the band's defining moment. On Fire reached number 7 in the UK Indie Chart, and met with much critical acclaim in the United Kingdom, but was less well received by the US music press, who cited Wareham's "vocal limitations" as a weakness.

Galaxie 500 recorded two sessions for John Peel's BBC Radio 1 programme, later released on the Peel Sessions album. Their cover of Jonathan Richman's "Don't Let Our Youth Go To Waste" was voted number 41 in 1989's Festive 50 by listeners to the show.

=== Later releases and breakup ===
The band split up in the spring of 1991 after the release of their third album, This Is Our Music. Wareham, who had already moved back to New York, quit the band after a lengthy American tour, as preparations were underway for a tour of Japan. As Wareham later said, "Galaxie 500 broke up because it was time. We broke up as a result of internal contradictions. Columbia Records was interested in signing us, but the making of the previous album had been very difficult—and clearly we weren't getting along—so why should we continue to sit in a room and make music together?" Their last performance was on April 5, 1991, at Bowdoin College for the campus radio station, WBOR.

Galaxie 500's records were released in the US and UK on the independent Rough Trade label. When Rough Trade went bankrupt in 1991, Krukowski and Yang purchased the masters at auction, reissuing them on Rykodisc in 1996 as a box set containing all three albums and another disc of rarities.

=== Post-breakup activities ===
After leaving Galaxie 500, Wareham tried his hand at production, working with Mercury Rev. He released a solo single, "Anesthesia," in February 1992, and formed a new band, Luna. Krukowski and Yang continued to record under the moniker Pierre Etoile (French for "Rock Star"), and then Damon & Naomi (whose first two releases were also produced by Kramer), and as members of Magic Hour. They also began the avant-garde press Exact Change.

In June 2010 Wareham announced on his website that he would be going on an autumn tour under the moniker "Dean Wareham plays Galaxie 500," where he would, as the moniker suggests, only play Galaxie 500 songs.

== Musical style and influences ==
Galaxie 500 was an indie rock band that used simple instrumental techniques that were enhanced through an atmospheric production style. The sound has been described as "reverb-saturated, woozily slow-paced and minimal." Music critic Jim DeRogatis assessed, “Galaxy 500 never altered its trippy, somnambulistic formula, but what a splendid formula it was.” In his book Gimme Indie Rock, music journalist Andrew Earles described the band's sound as "a usually slow to mid-tempo amalgam of the Velvet Underground, the Feelies, the U.K.'s proto-shoegaze/drone rock icons Spacemen 3, The Dream Syndicate, and Television gently pushed through a hazy dream-pop filter." Jenn Pelly of Pitchfork explained: "With its dislocating atmospheres and diffident vocals, all dream pop is outsider music. Galaxie 500 sounded so removed from a sense of time or place that they made this fact nonnegotiable."

The Velvet Underground and Jonathan Richman have been identified as key influences. In interviews on the Galaxie 500 DVD Don't Let Our Youth Go to Waste, Wareham cites Spacemen 3 as another key inspiration.

== Legacy ==
Jason Ankeny of AllMusic said Galaxie 500 was "arguably as influential on indie rock as the Velvet Underground was on the rock and punk that came after it" and that the band had a "lasting effect on the shoegaze and slowcore movements that followed".

Galaxie 500's music had an influence on many later indie music groups, including Low. Their music has been covered and referenced by several well-known artists. In Liz Phair's song "Stratford-on-Guy", she sings, "And I was pretending that I was in a Galaxie 500 video." In Xiu Xiu's song "Dr. Troll", Jamie Stewart sings, "Listen to On Fire and pretend someone could love you." On Neutral Milk Hotel's debut album, On Avery Island, the song "Naomi" was written about Naomi Yang, and includes the line "There is no Naomi in view/She walks through Cambridge stocks and strolls"; in 2011, Yang created a music video for the song, including an anecdote recounting how Neutral Milk Hotel member Julian Koster gave her a copy of the album and told her the song was written about her. The Brian Jonestown Massacre's And This Is Our Music was titled in reference to the group's album This Is Our Music (which itself was titled after Ornette Coleman's album This Is Our Music). Sonic Youth frontman Thurston Moore has cited Galaxie 500's album Today as "the guitar record of 1988".

"Tugboat" has been covered by many artists, including The Submarines, who recorded it with indie rock producer Adam Lasus for their iTunes Live Session EP; British Sea Power, on Rough Trade compilation Stop Me If You Think You've Heard This One Before...; Welsh lo-fi band Joanna Gruesome; Portastatic; and Kiwi Jr., for a planned concert of Galaxie 500 covers at Rough Trade Brooklyn set to coincide with Record Store Day and the release of Galaxie's Copenhagen on vinyl. In 2010 the bands Cloudland Canyon and Citay appeared on a 7-inch EP together wherein they both covered Galaxie 500, the former taking on "Temperature's Rising" and the latter doing a version of "Tugboat". English artist World Of Fox covered "Flowers" on his 2011 release on Where It's At Is Where You Are Records.

In 2012 the song "Tugboat" was featured in the film The Perks of Being a Wallflower, directed by Stephen Chbosky and based on his book of the same name.

== Band members ==
- Dean Wareham - guitar, vocals
- Damon Krukowski - drums
- Naomi Yang - bass guitar, vocals

== Discography ==
=== Studio albums ===
- Today (Aurora, 1988)
- On Fire (Rough Trade, 1989)
- This Is Our Music (Rough Trade, 1990)

=== Compilations ===
- Galaxie 500 (box set) (Rykodisc, 1996)
- The Portable Galaxie 500 (best-of) (Rykodisc, 1998)
- Uncollected (rarities) (2004)
- Uncollected Noise New York '88–'90 (archival material, 2024)

=== Live albums ===
- Copenhagen (Rykodisc, 1997)
- Peel Sessions (2005)
- CBGB 12.13.88 (2025)

=== Singles ===
- "Tugboat"/"King of Spain" (Aurora, 1988)
- "Oblivious" included on a hard-vinyl compilation 7-inch free with Chemical Imbalance magazine
- "Blue Thunder"/"Hail" (split w/ Straitjacket Fits) (1989)
- "Blue Thunder EP" (Rough Trade, 1990)
- "Rain"/"Don't Let Our Youth Go to Waste" (1990) Caff
- "Fourth of July"/"Here She Comes Now" (Rough Trade, 1990)
- "Snowstorm" (live)/"Pictures" (live) (2004)
- "Temperature's Rising”/“Crazy" (Yeti, 2013)
- "Shout You Down"/"I Wanna Live” (20-20-20, 2024)

=== Promotional videos ===
- "Tugboat" (1988)
- "Blue Thunder" (1989)
- "When Will You Come Home" (1989)
- "Fourth of July" (1990)

=== DVDs ===
- Don't Let Our Youth Go to Waste (2004)
