= Damon Krukowski =

American musician and writer

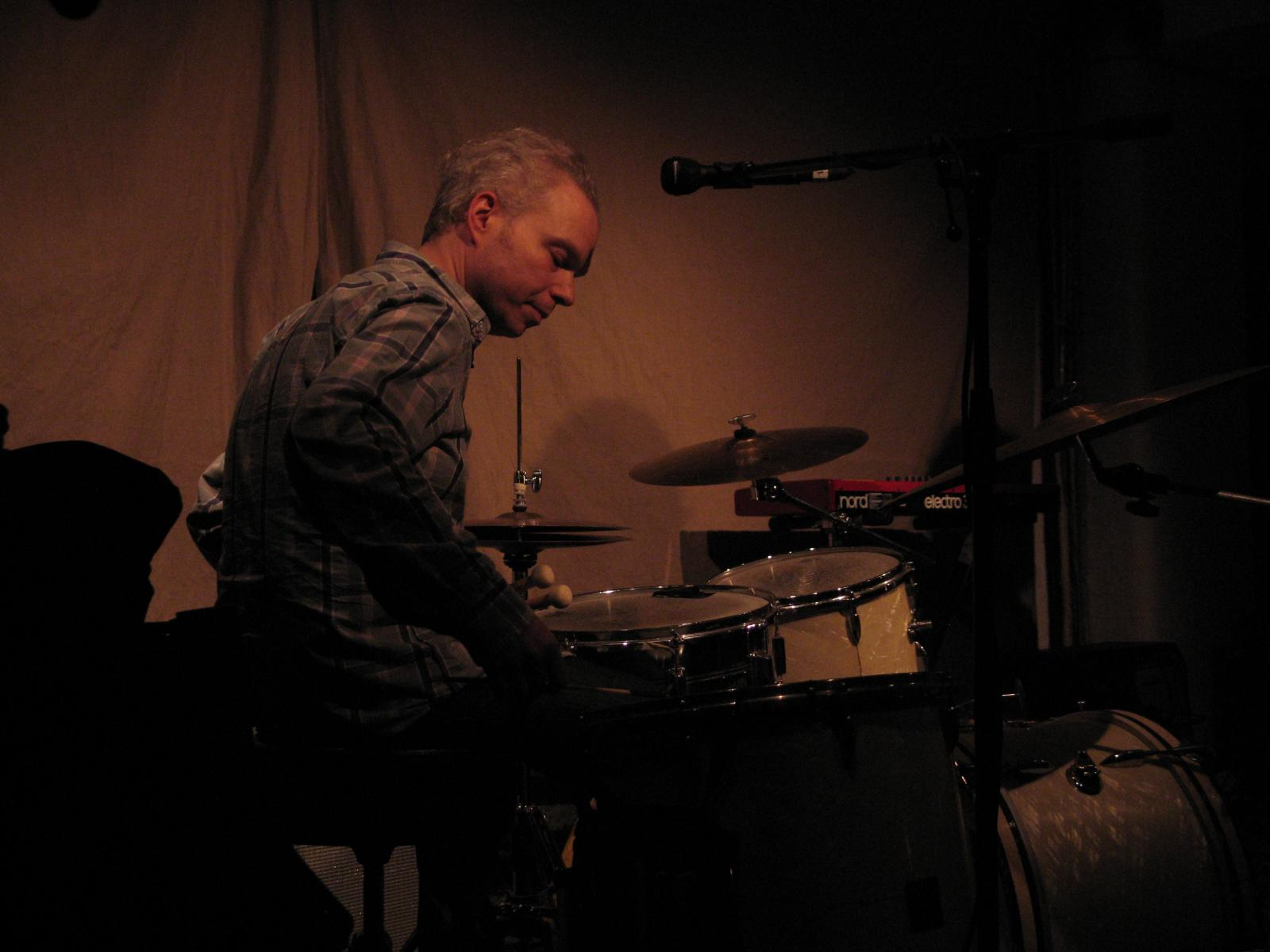

Background information
- Born: September 6, 1963 (age 63); United States
- Genres: Indie pop; dreampop; psychedelic folk
- Instruments: Vocals, drums, guitar
- Website: www.damonandnaomi.com www.dadadrummer.com

Damon Krukowski (born September 6, 1963) is an American musician, poet and writer. He was a member of the dreampop band Galaxie 500 and the psychedelic rock band Magic Hour, and is half of the psychedelic folk duo Damon & Naomi. He is also a published poet and writer. He lives in Cambridge, Massachusetts.

== Early life and education ==
Damon Krukowski was born on September 6, 1963, in the United States. He was educated at Harvard College where he studied social theory as an undergraduate and received a BA degree in 1985, and earned an M.A. degree in English and American literature.

Krukowski is married to his former classmate, and fellow musician, Naomi Yang.

== Music ==
Krukowski was the drummer with the dreampop band Galaxie 500 on all their recordings from 1987 until their split in 1991. He has also recorded three albums and toured with the psychedelic rock band Magic Hour. Since Galaxie 500's split he has worked as duo with his partner Naomi Yang as Damon & Naomi.

== Publishing, writing, and journalism ==
In 1989 Krukowski and his partner set up the independent book publisher Exact Change, which specialises in publishing 19th and 20th century avant-garde literature.

He has taught writing, sound, and writing about sound in Harvard Extension School's Writing Program, and studio art department.

Krukowski has written poetry and prose works as well as writing extensively on music, sound and the music industry for Pitchfork and has had books on the subject published.

In 2017 he wrote and presented the six part Radiotopia podcast, Ways of Hearing.

== List of publications ==
- 5000 Musical Terms (1995, Burning Deck Press ISBN 1886224048)
- The Memory Theater Burned (2005, Turtle Point Press ISBN 1885586957)
- Afterimage (2011, Ugly Duckling Presse ISBN 1933254882)
- The New Analog: Listening and Reconnecting in a Digital World (US: 2017, The New Press ISBN 1620971976)
  - The New Analog: Listening and Reconnecting in a Digital World (UK: 2017, MIT Press ISBN 0262037912)
  - The New Analog: Como escuchar y reconectarnos con el mundo digital (Translated by Núria Molines Galarza, Spain: 2017, Alpha Decay ISBN 8494742302)
  - Ascoltare il rumore. La riscoperta dell'analogico nell'era della musica digitale (Translated by Chiara Veltri, Italy: 2019, BigSur ISBN 886998172X)
- Ways of Hearing (2019, MIT Press ISBN 0262039648)
