= Naomi Yang (musician) =

American singer (born 1964)

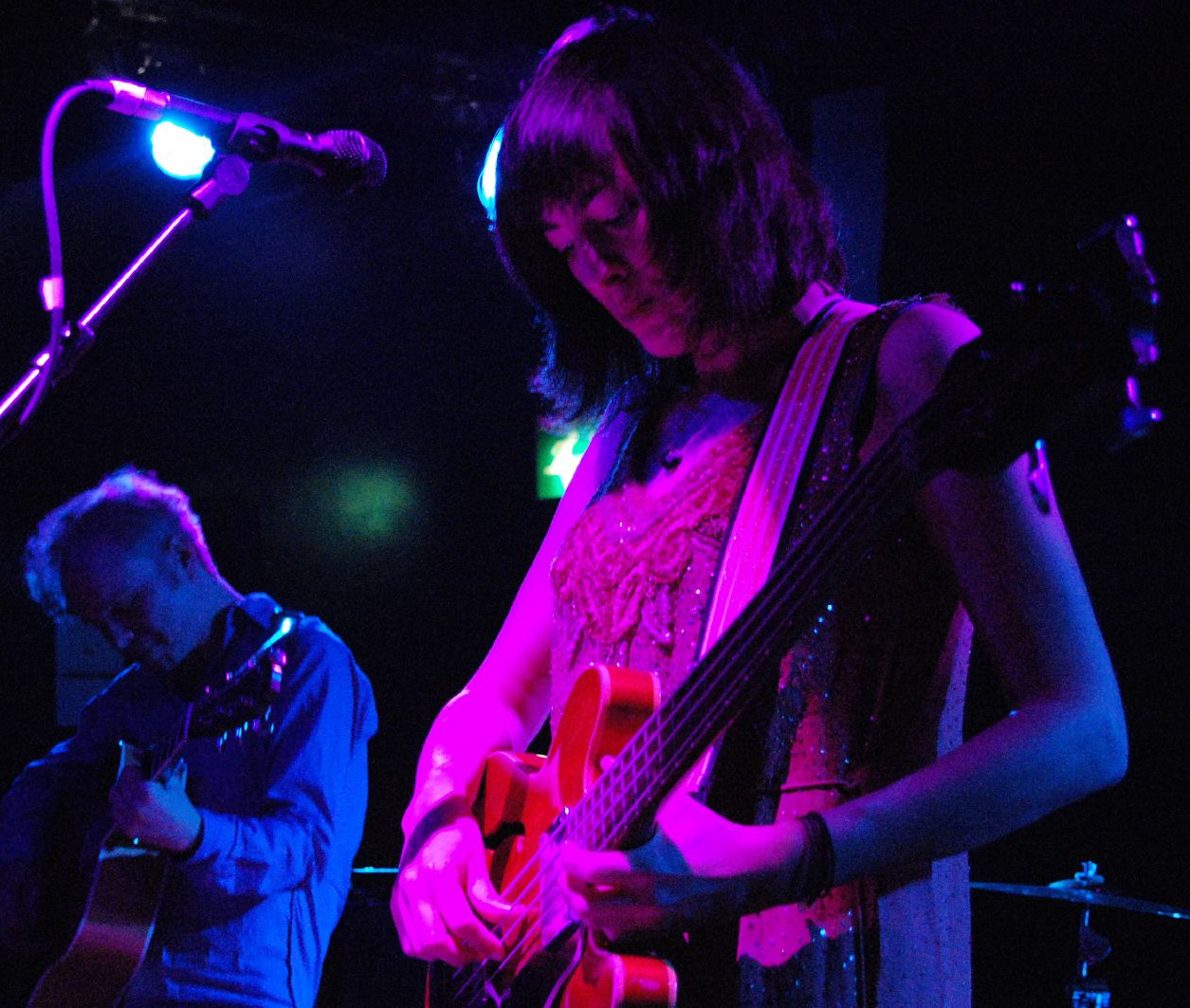
- Yang performing with Damon & Naomi in London, 2007

Background information
- Born: September 15, 1964 (age 62)
- Genres: Indie pop; dream pop; psychedelic folk
- Occupations: Musician; graphic designer; photographer; filmmaker
- Instruments: Vocals; bass guitar; keyboards; harmonium
- Member of: Damon & Naomi
- Formerly of: Galaxie 500; Magic Hour
- Website: www.naomivision.com

Naomi Yang (born September 15, 1964) is an American musician, graphic designer, photographer and filmmaker. She was a member of the dream pop band Galaxie 500, psychedelic rock band Magic Hour, and is half of the psychedelic folk duo Damon & Naomi. She has also made videos for a wide number of artists including Future Bible Heroes, Waxahatchee and Julia Holter. She lives in Cambridge, Massachusetts.

== Early life and education ==
Naomi Yang was born on September 15, 1964, in New York City. Yang's father, was the noted landscape photographer John Yang, who was born in China, and her mother was American Linda Gureasko. She has one brother, David Yang, a violist and the director of Chamber Music at the University of Pennsylvania.

Yang graduated from Harvard College in 1986 with honors in visual and environmental studies. From 1986 to 1989, she studied architecture at the Harvard Graduate School of Design.

== Music ==
Yang was bassist and occasional vocalist with dream pop band Galaxie 500 on all their recordings from 1987 until their split in 1991. She then recorded three albums and toured with the psychedelic rock band Magic Hour. Since Galaxie 500's split she has worked as duo with her partner Damon Krukowski as Damon & Naomi who have collaborated with notable musicians such as the guitarist Michio Kurihara and members of the Japanese rock band Ghost.

== Publishing ==
In 1989 Yang set up the independent book publisher Exact Change with her partner, who specializes in publishing 19th and 20th century avant-garde literature.

== Graphic design ==
Yang has been responsible for designing the covers of all of Exact Changes publications as well as the sleeves of all of Galaxie 500 and Damon & Naomi's releases. She has also done design work for a wide number of clients including The John Cage Trust.

== Photography and film ==
Yang's photographs have been reproduced in a variety of publications including Giant Robot

In 2011 Yang moved into film-making, directing and editing videos for a wide variety of musical artists.

=== Music videos ===
- Meg Baird – "The Finder" (2011, Drag City)
- Julia Holter – "Our Sorrows" (2012, RVNG Intl.)
- Future Bible Heroes – "Living, Loving, Partygoing" (2013, Merge Records)
- Tanya Donelly – "Mass Ave" (2013, American Laundromat)
- Marissa Nadler – "Drive" (2014, Sacred Bones)
- Waxahatchee – "La Loose" (2015, Merge Records)
- MV & EE - "Feel Alright" (2016, Woodsist)
- Heather Trost – "Agistri" (2016, LM Duplication)
- Lee Ranaldo – "New Thing" (2017, Mute Records)
- Steve Gunn – "Vagabond" (2019, Matador Records)

=== Fortune (2013) ===
In 2013 Yang directed and edited the short silent film Fortune which has screened around the world usually accompanied by live accompaniment by Damon & Naomi.

The film was screened at the 2015 Istanbul Film Festival.

=== Never Be a Punching Bag for Nobody (2023) ===
In 2023 Yang wrote, directed and photographed the feature length documentary Never Be a Punching Bag for Nobody. The film weaves together three stories

- The East Boston boxing gym and its proprieter Sal Bartolo Jr, the son of Sal Bartolo.
- The expansion of Boston's Logan Airport in the 1960s and the women who protested against the expansion and the effect it would have on their East Boston community.
- Yang's own family history.

The film premiered at the Independent Film Festival Boston in 2023 where it received the Special Jury Prize for Documentary.. It was subsequently selected for inclusion at multiple film festivals.

=== Superfund: The Unseen Landscape (2027) ===
Her upcoming documentary film, Superfund: The Unseen Landscape, focuses on formerly toxic sites that have been cleaned up by Environmental Protection Agency.

== Exhibitions ==
In 2011, the Aviary Gallery in Jamaica Plain, Massachusetts presented a solo show of Yang's photography and video. She has also exhibited as part of the gallery's Sound on Sight group exhibition in 2016.

== Personal life ==
Yang is married to drummer and author Damon Krukowski, whom she first met in the 1970s while attending the Dalton School in New York City. Yang is the subject of "Naomi", a song from Neutral Milk Hotel's debut studio album On Avery Island. She later created an unofficial music video for the song, in which she lip-syncs to the lyrics.
