= Waiting... (EP) =

EP by The Rockfords
- Released: January 2004
- Recorded: October 2003
- Genre: Alternative rock
- Language: English
- Label: Ten Club
- Producer: John Goodmanson

The Rockfords chronology
Live Seattle, WA 12/13/03 (2003)	Waiting... (2004)

Waiting... is an EP by the American rock band The Rockfords. It was released in January 2004 through Ten Club.

== Overview ==
The Rockfords features members of Goodness and Pearl Jam. The EP was recorded in October 2003. The band worked with producer John Goodmanson, who also produced the band's debut album, The Rockfords. The EP was released in 2004 through Pearl Jam's website.

== Track listing ==
All tracks are written by Carrie Akre, Chris Friel, Rick Friel, Mike McCready, and Danny Newcomb.

No.	Title	Length
1.	"Waiting"
2.	"Everything"
3.	"So Young"
4.	"Call My Name"

== Personnel ==
The Rockfords

- Carrie Akre – vocals
- Chris Friel – drums
- Rick Friel – bass guitar
- Mike McCready – guitar
- Danny Newcomb – guitar

Production

- Danger Island Music – design
- John Goodmanson – production
