= Live Seattle, WA 12/13/03 =

Live album by The Rockfords
- Released: December 28, 2003
- Recorded: December 13, 2003, Crocodile Cafe, Seattle, Washington
- Genre: Alternative rock
- Length: 84:19
- Language: English
- Label: Kufala

The Rockfords chronology
| The Rockfords (2000) | Live Seattle, WA 12/13/03 (2003) | Waiting... (2004) |

Live Seattle, WA 12/13/03 is a two-disc live album by the American rock band The Rockfords. It was released on December 28, 2003 through Kufala Recordings.

== Overview ==
The Rockfords features members of Goodness and Pearl Jam. The album was recorded on December 13, 2003 at the Crocodile Cafe in Seattle, Washington. The songs performed at the concert come from the band's debut album, The Rockfords, as well as the EP Waiting..., which was released in early 2004. The album was released through Kufala Recordings in 2003.

== Track listing ==
=== Disc one ===
1. "Adelaide" (Chris Friel, Rick Friel, Mike McCready, Danny Newcomb) – 5:00
2. "This Life" (Carrie Akre, Friel, Friel, McCready, Newcomb) – 4:04
3. "Waiting" (Akre, Friel, Friel, McCready, Newcomb) – 4:28
4. "Flashes" (Akre, Friel, Friel, McCready, Newcomb) – 3:35
5. "Do It" – 6:50
6. "Everything" (Akre, Friel, Friel, McCready, Newcomb) – 4:38
7. "Spiral" (Friel, Friel, McCready, Newcomb) – 4:55
8. "So Young" (Akre, Friel, Friel, McCready, Newcomb) – 7:15

=== Disc two ===
1. "Call My Name" (Akre, Friel, Friel, McCready, Newcomb) – 5:00
2. "Coat of Arms" (Akre, Friel, Friel, McCready, Newcomb) – 5:37
3. "Silver Lining" (Friel, Friel, McCready, Newcomb) – 6:59
4. "Something True" (Akre, Friel, Friel, McCready, Newcomb) – 5:01
5. "Sureshot" (Akre, Friel, Friel, McCready, Newcomb) – 5:19
6. "Distress" (Friel, Friel, McCready, Newcomb) – 3:50
7. "Island" (Friel, Friel, McCready, Newcomb) – 4:12
8. "Windows" (Akre, Friel, Friel, McCready, Newcomb) – 7:36

== Personnel ==
The Rockfords

- Carrie Akre – vocals
- Chris Friel – drums
- Rick Friel – bass guitar
- Mike McCready – guitar
- Danny Newcomb – guitar

Production

- Hank Fleming, Bootsy Holler – photos
- Ben Kersten – recording, mixing
