= Down to You =

2000 film directed by Kris Isacsson

- Theatrical release poster
- Directed by: Kris Isacsson
- Written by: Kris Isacsson
- Produced by: Jason Kliot; Joana Vicente
- Starring: Freddie Prinze, Jr.; Julia Stiles; Selma Blair; Shawn Hatosy; Zak Orth; Ashton Kutcher; Rosario Dawson; Lucie Arnaz; Henry Winkler
- Cinematography: Robert D. Yeoman
- Edited by: Stephen A. Rotter
- Music by: Edmund Choi
- Distributed by: Miramax Films
- Release date: January 21, 2000
- Running time: 92 minutes
- Country: United States
- Languages: English; French
- Budget: $11 million
- Box office: $24.4 million

Down to You is a 2000 American romantic comedy film written and directed by Kris Isacsson, starring Freddie Prinze Jr. and Julia Stiles as young lovers who meet in college and go through the ups and downs of a relationship. Selma Blair, Shawn Hatosy, Zak Orth, Ashton Kutcher, Rosario Dawson, Lucie Arnaz, and Henry Winkler play supporting roles. Isacsson's first and only theatrical feature film, Down to You paired Prinze and Stiles a year after their respective starring roles in the successful high school-set romantic comedies She's All That and 10 Things I Hate About You. The released version of the film was very different than the screenplay and the director's original cut, due to extensive post-production ordered by Miramax chief Harvey Weinstein. Despite being the second-highest grossing film at the domestic box office its opening weekend, the film was panned by critics, and grossed $24.4 million against its $11 million budget.

== Plot ==
While attending college in NYC, sophomore Al and freshman Imogen begin dating. After three months, they have fallen in love. Imogen, an aspiring artist, arranges a private showing at an art gallery for Al's birthday, after which the two have sex for the first time.

Al's roommate Monk, who has become a pornographic film actor and director, tells him that love is illusory and fleeting, and Monk's co-star Cyrus flirts with Al. Al loses a bet, so must perform as an extra in one of Monk's films. This causes an argument between him and Imogen, who wants to spend time with him before she goes to France for the summer. He abandons the film in favor of spending the night with her.

While in France, Imogen is asked by her cousin if she and Al will marry. This unnerves her as she is only nineteen, and she acts differently toward Al on her return. His father, who hosts a cooking show, wants to do a father-and-son show after Al graduates, but he would rather pursue his dream of becoming a chef of French cuisine.

Concerned that he and Imogen are drifting apart, Al arranges a picnic in the countryside; on the way back, she drives drunk and crashes into a tree. Seeing the accident as a sign, they try to improve their relationship. Though they seem happy, Monk predicts it is a precursor to a breakup.

When Imogen declines to have sex one night, Al feels emasculated and has a sexual fantasy about Cyrus. Imogen fears that she may be pregnant, and though she turns out not to be, this further strains their relationship. At one of Monk's parties, Cyrus tries to seduce Al, but he declines.

Meanwhile, Imogen spends time with musician acquaintance Jim; when Al learns she has agreed to design Jim's album cover, they argue and she leaves upset. The next day, she confesses she had sex with Jim afterward. After a tearful breakup, she moves to San Francisco to finish school.

Al graduates, but becomes depressed. Monk is too preoccupied with his new work as an author and lecturer to comfort him, and their friendship dissolves. After a period of isolation, Al starts dating again and has a casual relationship with Cyrus, but she eventually moves away.

Al enrolls in the French Culinary Institute but feels unmotivated and drops out, so is reduced to bar-hopping with his single friend Eddie. Drunk and missing Imogen, he tries to purge himself of his feelings for her by drinking a bottle of her shampoo. This results in his hospitalization.

Al's parents throw a party with his friends to lift his spirits. Monk apologizes to Al, and they mend their friendship. Imogen appears, and they spend time catching up; she has become a cover artist for a San Francisco-based book publisher. She confesses that she misses him, and gives him a book titled Down to You with her cover artwork depicting the two of them in love. They rekindle their romance, deciding that they met too young but can start over. Al takes a job at a four-star restaurant in San Francisco and surprises Imogen with a romantic evening.

== Cast ==
- Freddie Prinze Jr. as Alfred "Al" Connelly
- Julia Stiles as Imogen
- Selma Blair as Cyrus, an MIT dropout turned pornographic film actress
- Shawn Hatosy as Eddie Hicks, one of Al's roommates
- Zak Orth as Monk Jablonski, Al's other roommate
- Ashton Kutcher as Jim Morrison, a musician who dresses and acts like his namesake, Jim Morrison of the Doors
- Rosario Dawson as Lana, Imogen's friend and later roommate
- Lucie Arnaz as Judy Connelly, Al's mother
- Henry Winkler as "Chef Ray" Connelly, Al's father

Adam Carolla and Jimmy Kimmel appear as themselves in a sequence in which Al imagines himself being made fun of on The Man Show. Additional minor roles are played by Zay Harding and Lauren German as a lovestruck couple, Chloe Hunter as one of Al's high school girlfriends, Bradley Pierce as one of Imogen's high school boyfriends, Lola Glaudini as a woman Al goes on a date with, Alexia Landeau as Imogen's cousin, Susan Blommaert as a psychiatrist, Frank Wood as a doctor, Joanna P. Adler as a woman who gives Eddie a nipple piercing, and Mark Blum as a television host interviewing Monk.

== Production ==
Writer-director Kris Isacsson had won the award for best short film at the 1997 Sundance Film Festival. Chris O'Falt, who worked on Down to You, described the screenplay in IndieWire as "an edgy, unorthodox look at a group of friends struggling with post-college life in New York." However, Miramax had recently had a big hit with the teen comedy She's All That, also starring Freddie Prinze Jr., and Miramax head Harvey Weinstein determined in post-production to transform Down to You into a similar film. According to O'Falt, "This led to a series of test screenings, re-edits, and expensive last minute reshoots, to say nothing of his demeaning verbal assaults on a promising young filmmaker. Heaven and earth were moved, and souls were crushed, because Weinstein knew how to react, not steer. As the film’s financier, it was Weinstein’s prerogative to Frankenstein Down to You as he saw fit. However, the result was a slightly-schizophrenic, over-budget film."

== Reception ==
Down to You opened at number 2 at the US box office and made $7.6 million in its opening weekend, behind Next Friday. It went on to gross $24.4 million worldwide. The film received negative reviews from critics. Owen Gleiberman of Entertainment Weekly gave it an "F" grade, calling the dialogue "embarrassing in its coy and wistful hungry-heart neuroticism" while criticizing the lead actors' performances and Isacsson's writing: "Making his first feature, writer-director Kris Isacsson treats the most squishy-sincere rituals of first love with a quivering sense of discovery. Obviously, it's a discovery to him. For the audience, it's like watching the dreckiest of teen puppy courtships trying to pass itself off as Annie Hall." In The New York Times, A. O. Scott described it as "scrubbed, wholesome and bland", opining that Isacsson "seems aware that a feature film requires narrative complication: not even really good-looking people can be happy all the time. But he flees from anything that might involve real human emotion, or for that matter any credible human activity other than looking good." Brendan Kelly of Variety wrote that "Prinze and Stiles have genuine screen charisma to spare, and there's something oddly appealing about this mushy romantic tale, but first-time feature writer-director Kris Isacsson doesn't have the skills to raise it far above its formulaic foundation."

On Rotten Tomatoes, it has a 3% approval rating based on 61 reviews, with an average score of 3.3/10. The website's critics consensus reads, "Down to You is ruined by a bland, by-the-numbers plot and an awful script." Metacritic, which uses a weighted average, assigned the film a score of 13 out of 100 based on 21 critics, indicating "overwhelming dislike".

== Home media ==
Buena Vista Home Entertainment (under the Miramax Home Entertainment banner) released the film on DVD and VHS on July 11, 2000. The DVD's bonus materials include trailers for 10 Things I Hate About You and She's All That, the music video for the song "It All Comes Down to You" by Billie Myers, a short behind-the-scenes look at the making of the film, and a short feature on the making of the Billie Myers music video.

In December 2010, Miramax was sold by The Walt Disney Company, their owners since 1993. That same month, the studio was taken over by private equity firm Filmyard Holdings. Filmyard licensed the home media rights for several Miramax titles to Echo Bridge Entertainment, and on April 19, 2011, Echo Bridge reissued Down to You on DVD. Echo Bridge then released the film on Blu-ray on March 26, 2013. Echo Bridge had also bundled it on a 2011 DVD set with three other Miramax romantic comedies (1997's Wishful Thinking, 2000's About Adam and 2003's My Boss's Daughter). In 2011, Filmyard Holdings licensed the Miramax library to streamer Netflix. This deal included Down to You, and ran for five years, eventually ending on June 1, 2016.

Filmyard Holdings sold Miramax to Qatari company beIN Media Group during March 2016. In April 2020, ViacomCBS (now known as Paramount Skydance) acquired the rights to Miramax's library, after buying a 49% stake in the studio from beIN. Down to You was one of the 700 titles they acquired in the deal, and since April 2020, the film has been distributed by Paramount Pictures. Paramount Home Entertainment subsequently began reissuing many Miramax titles. On November 29, 2022, they included it on a Freddie Prinze Jr. triple feature DVD set, with two of his other Miramax films (She's All That and Boys and Girls). Paramount Home Entertainment reissued the film on an individual Blu-ray on March 28, 2023. The film was made available on Paramount's subscription streaming service Paramount+, as well as on their free streaming service Pluto TV.

== Soundtrack ==
Down to You: Music from the Miramax Motion Picture

Soundtrack album
- Released: January 18, 2000

A soundtrack album was released simultaneously with the film, featuring twelve songs from the soundtrack. William Ruhlmann of AllMusic gave it two stars out of five in an unfavorable review, describing some songs and artists as similar-sounding imitations of more well-known ones from other recent romantic comedy soundtracks. He singled out Belle Perez as "the poster child for all this weightless pop/rock, following up her earnest greeting with 'This is me/Life should be/Fun for everyone.' Indeed, it should, and if you're in your late teens, maybe it is. But much of the Down to You soundtrack tries to be ingenuous and only manages to be callow." He singled out the closing track, Sam Phillips' "I Need Love", as a highlight, but opined that it made the rest of the album seem even less impressive in comparison.

=== Track listing ===
No.	Title	Writer(s)	Performer	Length
1.	"It All Comes Down to You"	Dianne Warren	Billie Myers	4:36
2.	"The Garden of You and I" (from Kismet, 1998)	Ginger Mackenzie	Ginger Mackenzie	2:35
3.	"Free to Go" (from One Part Lullaby, 1999)	Lou Barlow, Wally Gagel	The Folk Implosion	3:32
4.	"Shine on Me" (from Free Expression, 1999)	Paul Chastain, Ric Menck	Velvet Crush	1:56
5.	"Stay"	Kevin Bents, Patrick Daugherty, Deanna Kirk	Deanna Kirk	3:45
6.	"Silver Lining" (from The Rockfords, 2000)	Chris Friel, Rick Friel, Mike McCready, Danny Newcomb	The Rockfords	4:24
7.	"Hello World" (from Hello World, 2000)	Belle Perez, Jim Soulier	Belle Perez	3:15
8.	"Vagabond Angel"	Miranda Lee Richards	Miranda Lee Richards	4:04
9.	"I Must Have Done Something Right"	Chris Glenn, Fred Spigelman	Formosa	3:39
10.	"Spun Out" (from Spun Out, 1999)	Greg Stoddard, Brian Stewart	Psychic Rain	4:18
11.	"Didn't Mean to Do You Harm"	Jimmy Harry, Craig Wedren	Jimmy Harry, Craig Wedren	3:22
12.	"I Need Love" (from Martinis & Bikinis, 1994)	Sam Phillips	Sam Phillips	3:39

Additional songs used in the film but not included on the soundtrack album include:

- "Young Americans" by David Bowie
- "Moonchild" by Cibo Matto
- "Groove Is in the Heart" by Deee-Lite
- "Ready for a Fall" by P. J. Olsson
- "Junction City" by Big Lazy
- "Is There Something on Your Mind" by the Drowners
- "Here I Go Again" by Whitesnake
- "Heat of the Moment" by Asia
- "Mickey" by Toni Basil
- "My Little Corner of the World" by Yo La Tengo
- "When I Fall in Love"
- "Let's Stay Together" by Al Green
- "I Know a Girl" by Settie
- "Bye-Bye" by Marcy Playground
- "New Deli" by Andrew Dorfmam
- "Marching Through Georgia"
- "Black Balloon" by Goo Goo Dolls
- "Bad Boys" by Inner Circle
- "Koto Magic" by John Leach
- "Corazon Salvaje" by Ramon Fernandez
- "Smile" by Vitamin C
- "The Devil Made Me Sing to You" by Craig Wedren
- "Girl Stop" by Arcenius Bryant
- "Nervous Breakthrough" by Luscious Jackson
- "Lullaby of Clubland" by Everything but the Girl
- "Don't Go There" by Arcenius Bryant and John Schnall
- "Lady Shave" by GusGus
- "You're Nobody till Somebody Loves You" by James Darren
- "Can't Get Enough of Your Love, Babe" by Barry White
