= Ryan Leone =

American writer (1985–2022)

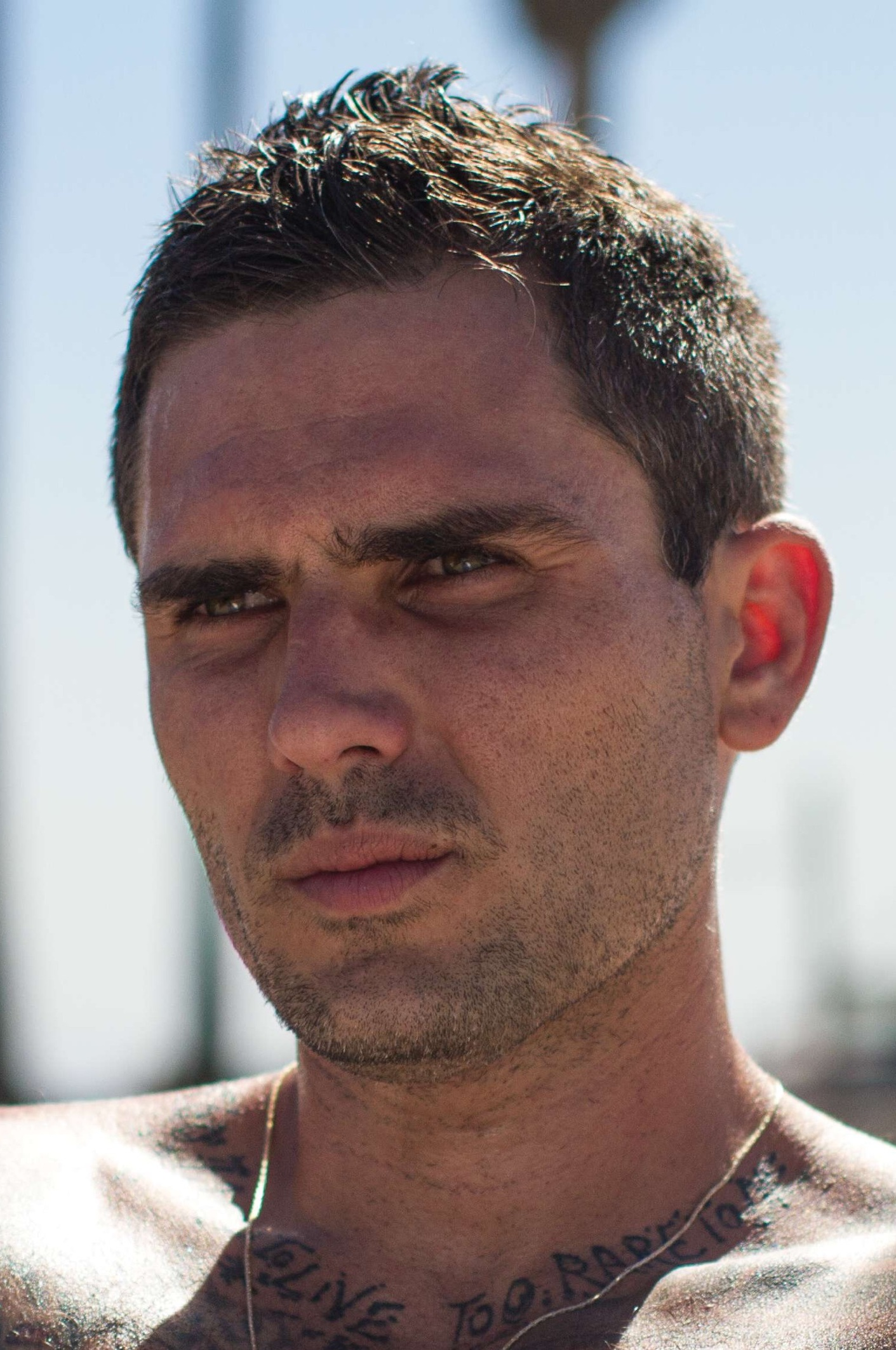
- Leone in 2019
- Born: August 3, 1985; Framingham, Massachusetts, U.S.
- Died: July 2, 2022 (aged 36); Sun Valley, California, U.S.
- Occupations: Novelist; film producer; artist; activist
- Partner: Karina Franco
- Children: 2
- Writing career
- Genre: Transgressive fiction
- Notable work: Wasting Talent

Ryan Harrison Leone (August 3, 1985 – July 2, 2022) was an American author and writer. He was best known for his semi-autobiographical addiction novel Wasting Talent.

== Biography ==
=== Career ===
Based on his experiences, Leone wrote his first novel while serving a five-year federal prison sentence for his involvement with an international heroin cartel called The Mendoza Clan. The Mendoza Clan was an Oaxacan Indian family that operated a heroin ring out of Mexico and reportedly smuggled millions of dollars' worth of drugs into the United States for over two decades. Leone sold the film rights to William De Los Santos, screenwriter and producer of the addiction film Spun.

In the January/February 2018 issue of Penthouse, De Los Santos said, "It captivated me with the poetry in how he told the story" when asked what attracted him to Leone's debut novel. Bret Easton Ellis, author of American Psycho, reviewed the book favorably on his podcast.

Idiot Savant: The Savage Life of Ryan Leone, a documentary about Leone's drug addiction and violent lifestyle went into production in the fall of 2017. Jim Uhls, screenwriter of Fight Club, had expressed his desire to be involved in the production of the film.

In 2018, Leone launched a non-profit organization called The Prodigy Foundation, in an effort to end mass incarceration and expand literacy in American prisons.

In 2020, Leone released a comedy album of spoken word stories called Drug Stories for Truckers: Volume One. The satirical album chronicles Leone's emotional breakdown between his second and third prison term. The album featured guest appearances from a number of his well known friends, including Johnny Depp, Tommy Chong, Nick Stahl, Freeway Ricky Ross, Simon Rex and George Jung.

=== Death ===
On July 2, 2022, it was rumored that Leone had died at the age of 36, which was later confirmed by Leone's fiancée Karina Franco. He had been admitted to hospital a few days prior and was suffering from a number of health issues stemming from a broken finger and pneumonia.

On June 29, Leone had posted on Instagram: "I broke my finger. Then, completely unrelated, I went to the hospital twice in a week. First time they told me I had pneumonia. I got a second opinion. No pneumonia. This is respiratory and gastrointestinal issues stemming from being on way too much Methadone 170 mgs!! My stomach becomes so bloated it feels like some rapid ever-expanding Willy Wonka inflated sanction." He went on about a rap project he was hoping to attend and concluded his post with the statement: "I need to stop being so reckless. I'm a dad now. Amen."

However, the Los Angeles County medical examiner stated that the cause of death was fentanyl and methamphetamine intoxication.

== Works ==
- Wasting Talent (2014)
- Drug Stories For Truckers: Volume I (2020)
- AntiHeroes: The Ballad of Mikey May (posthumous release; 2023)
