= Anthem (Goodness album) =

Studio album by Goodness
- Released: October 13, 1998
- Genre: Alternative rock, indie rock
- Length: 49:24
- Label: Immortal
- Producer: Ted Niceley

Goodness chronology
Goodness (1995)	Anthem (1998)	These Days (1999)

Anthem is the second studio album by the alternative rock band Goodness. It was released in 1998 on Immortal Records.

== Track listing ==
All songs by Goodness

1. Anthem - 3:42
2. Pretender - 3:31
3. Bitter Man - 3:40
4. I'd Rather - 3:59
5. Walkaway - 4:49
6. Night & Day - 3:20
7. Hiccup - 3:36
8. Turn the World Around - 4:07
9. Lost - 3:27
10. Our Last Goodbye - 5:35
11. Ashes - 4:24
12. Cozy - 5:14

== Personnel ==
- Carrie Akre - vocals
- Garth Reeves - guitar, vocals
- Chris Friel - drums
- Fiia McGann - bass, vocals
- Danny Newcomb - guitar

Additional personnel

- Eric Akre - percussion
- Chris Akre - vocals
- Chris Xefos - keyboards
- Carl Glanville - mixing, engineer
- Ted Niceley - producer
