= ...Last the Evening =

Studio album by Carrie Akre
- Released: October 30, 2007
- Genre: Alternative rock
- Length: 46:37
- Label: Loveless
- Producer: Carrie Akre, Steve Fisk

Carrie Akre chronology
Invitation (2002)	...Last the Evening (2007)

...Last the Evening is the third solo studio album by the American artist Carrie Akre.

== Track listing ==
1. "Courage" – 4:20
2. "Last the Evening" – 3:56
3. "Half Shelf Life" – 4:00
4. "Take My Heart" – 4:24
5. "Stupid Is" – 3:45
6. "Breathe" – 4:19
7. "Hide a Lie" – 3:18
8. "Trafalgar Square" – 3:25
9. "Halo" – 4:01
10. "Back & Forth" – 4:06
11. "Secret" – 7:03

== Personnel ==
- Carrie Akre – vocals, guitar, keyboards
- Jared Clifton – guitar
- Danny Newcomb – guitar
- Mark Pickerel – drums, percussion
- Johnny Sangster – bass, guitar
