= The Rockfords (album) =

Studio album by The Rockfords
- Released: February 1, 2000
- Recorded: 1999 at Studio Litho and John & Stu's Place, Seattle, Washington
- Genre: Alternative rock
- Length: 49:21
- Label: Epic
- Producer: John Goodmanson

The Rockfords chronology
The Rockfords (2000)	Live Seattle, WA 12/13/03 (2003)

Professional ratings
Review scores
Source	Rating
Allmusic	3/5 stars

The Rockfords is the only full-length studio album by the American rock band The Rockfords. It was released on February 1, 2000 through Epic Records.

== Overview ==
The Rockfords features members of Goodness and Pearl Jam. The album was recorded in 1999 at Studio Litho and John & Stu's Place in Seattle, Washington. Studio Litho is owned by Pearl Jam guitarist Stone Gossard. The band worked with producer John Goodmanson, who also mixed the album. Vocalist/guitarist Nancy Wilson of Heart contributes guest vocals on the track "Riverwide". Theresa E. LaVeck of Allmusic called the album a "compelling, if uneven, collaborative effort."

== Track listing ==
All music is composed by Chris Friel, Rick Friel, Mike McCready, and Danny Newcomb, except where noted.

No.	Title	Lyrics	Music	Length
1.	"Adelaide"	Newcomb		4:19
2.	"Flashes"	Carrie Akre, McCready		3:24
3.	"Silver Lining"	Newcomb		4:25
4.	"This Life"	Akre, Newcomb		3:50
5.	"Distress"	McCready		3:03
6.	"Coat of Arms"	Akre		4:34
7.	"Spiral"	McCready		3:56
8.	"Something True"	Akre		4:07
9.	"Riverwide"	Nancy Wilson	McCready, Wilson	4:25
10.	"Sureshot"	Akre		4:17
11.	"Windows"	Akre, McCready		5:03
12.	"Island"	Friel		3:58
Total length:				49:21

Japanese bonus track

No.	Title	Length
13.	"Heart in Your Hands"

== Personnel ==
The Rockfords

- Carrie Akre – vocals
- Chris Friel – drums
- Rick Friel – bass guitar
- Mike McCready – guitar
- Danny Newcomb – guitar

Additional musicians and production

- Ames Design – package design
- Greg Calbi – mastering
- John Goodmanson – production, arranging, mixing
- Nancy Wilson – vocals on "Riverwide"
