= William De Los Santos =

American director and writer

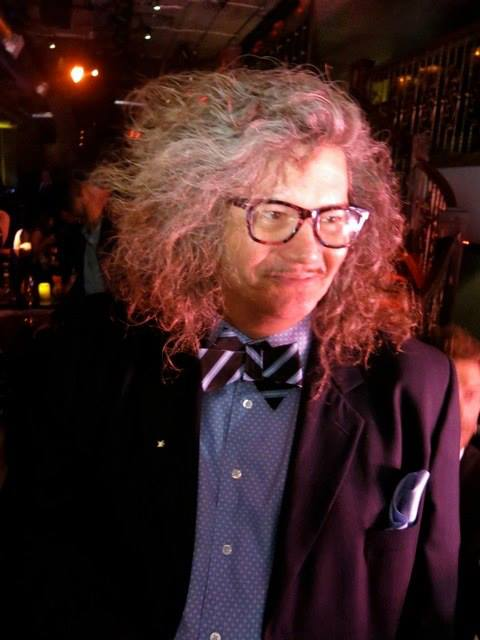
- De Los Santos at the Spring Breakers Hollywood premiere in May 2013
- Occupations: Author, poet, screenwriter, director, producer, artist
- Children: 1
- Writing career
- Period: 1989-present
- Genres: Dark comedy, drama, historic
- Notable work: Spun

Signature
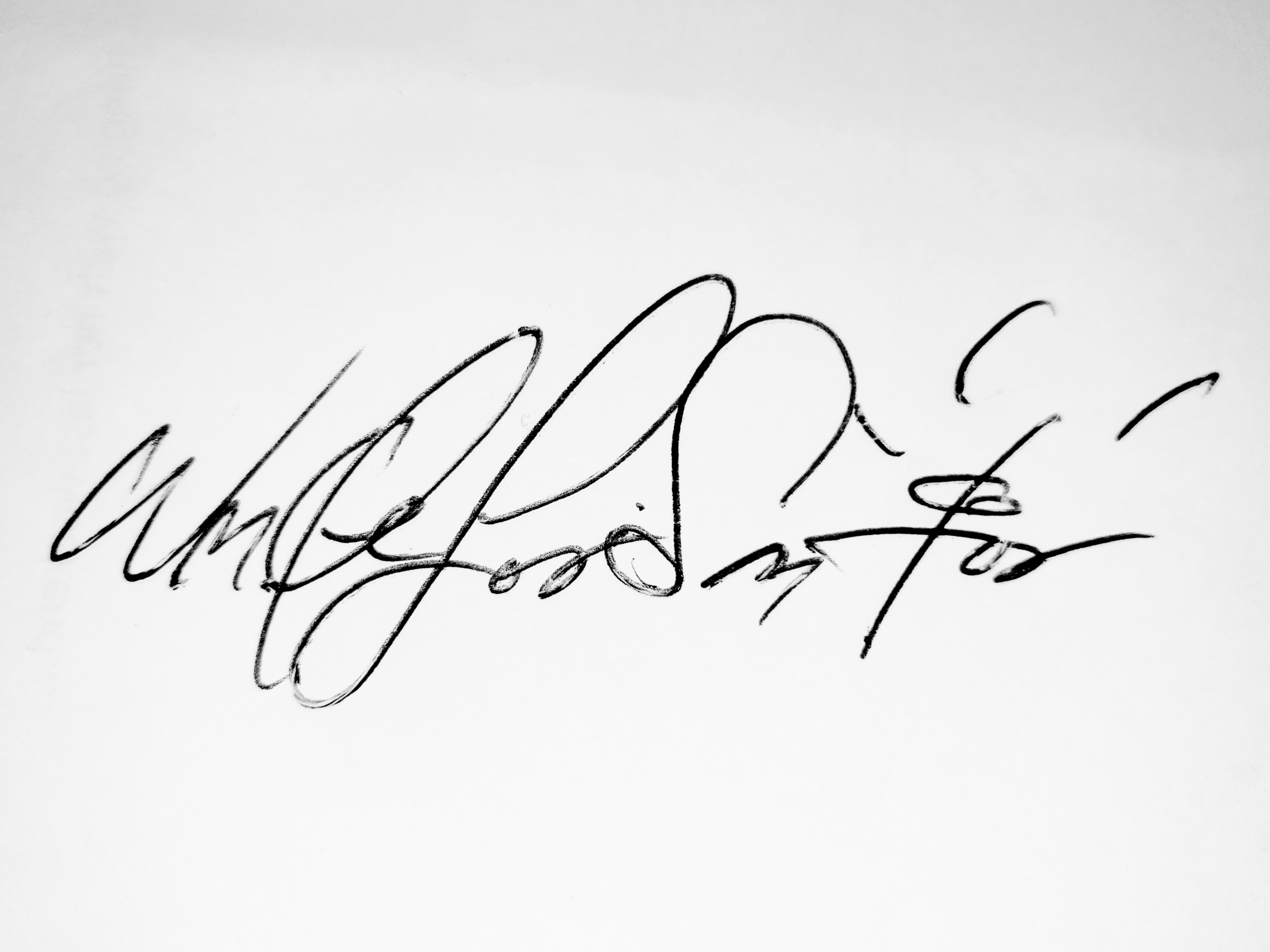

William De Los Santos is a Hawaiian Irish American author, poet, screenwriter, film director and producer. He is best known for having written and produced the 2003 film Spun, which starred Jason Schwartzman (who portrays De Los Santos in the film), Mickey Rourke, Brittany Murphy, Mena Suvari and John Leguizamo.

== Family, Personal ==
De Los Santos is the son of Abraham 'Tiki' De Los Santos, a Hawaiian politician and entertainer and Kathleen Marie O'Carroll (Cornett/Petroff). He is also the grandson of Herman Haimowitz, an American painter and woodcut artist. He was raised by a fireman, William Raymond Hilbert. De Los Santos has 10 half brothers and sisters.

De Los Santos has one child, a son Abraham Hero De Los Santos born 2013 with actress and Miss Asian America 2006-2007 Jennifer Field.

== Education ==
De Los Santos attended Chaffey High School in Ontario, California and Point Loma College in San Diego, California where he played basketball. He then transferred to Eastern Oregon State University in La Grande, Oregon. De Los Santos also attended University of La Verne in La Verne, California and University of Oregon in Eugene, Oregon.

== Professional career ==
De Los Santos wrote the original screenplay for Spun (Columbia Pictures/TriStar Pictures), a work inspired by his experience in the Eugene, Oregon drug subculture. Originally ignored by director Jonas Åkerlund, De Los Santos continued to phone Åkerlund for two years until he finally agreed to read his script. The film has been billed as an autobiography of sorts featuring De Los Santos as the character Ross, portrayed by Jason Schwartzman. Roger Ebert described the film as having "effortless wickedness" but said the film's "charm" was "admittedly an acquired and elusive taste". He gave the film 3 out of 4 stars.

De Los Santos wrote the screenplay adaptation for the upcoming motion-picture based on Iceberg Slim's novel, Mama Black Widow.

De Los Santos along with Arizona writer, Stan Pirog, has co-written the screenplay for a film of the life of Plato entitled The Man of The Republic which is currently in development with producer Chris Hanley and his Muse Productions.

De Los Santos also wrote and is set to direct his 2013 film, Tranzloco.

De Los Santos directed the music video 'Mistakes Like This' for Atlantic Records recording artists Prelow in 2014.

In 2017 De Los Santos purchased the motion picture rights to the novel Wasting Talent from author Ryan Leone and adapted the story into a new script entitled Love in Vein.

Writer Chris Campion, from Dazed & Confused Magazine, called De Los Santos, "...the most exciting American screenwriter of his generation...one minute he appears to be a deranged hustler trapped by mad ambition, and locked on a path determined by self-delusion. The next, he is a visionary poet whose wild and inspired ideas bear the spark of unfettered genius."
