= The Rockfords =

American rock band

- Origin: Seattle, Washington, U.S.
- Genres: Alternative rock
- Years active: 1999–2003
- Label: Epic
- Members: Carrie Akre; Chris Friel; Rick Friel; Mike McCready; Danny Newcomb

The Rockfords were an American rock band formed in Seattle, Washington, in 1999 by Carrie Akre, Chris Friel, and Danny Newcomb of Goodness, Mike McCready of Pearl Jam, and Rick Friel of Jodie Watts. The group served as a side project for its members, some of whom had already tasted success with their respective bands.

== History ==
Chris Friel, Rick Friel, Danny Newcomb, and Mike McCready were originally members of the band Shadow during the mid-1980s in Seattle, Washington. After a couple of attempts at breaking into the Los Angeles, California music scene, the group broke up and the band members went their separate ways. McCready would go on to co-form Pearl Jam in 1990 and Chris Friel and Danny Newcomb would go on to be a part of the band Goodness. Sometime as early as June 20, 1998, Friel and Newcomb would invite McCready to play with Goodness onstage prior to a Pearl Jam set. They decided afterward to put a band together with Rick Friel and Goodness vocalist Carrie Akre. They named themselves The Rockfords, after one of McCready's favorite TV shows The Rockford Files.

The band's debut album, The Rockfords, was released on February 1, 2000, through Epic Records. Produced by John Goodmanson, it featured vocalist/guitarist Nancy Wilson (of Heart) contributing guest vocals on the track "Riverwide". Theresa E. LaVeck of AllMusic called the album a "compelling, if uneven, collaborative effort". The band members would go back to their regular work for some time after playing at least five shows together in the Seattle area in 2000.

In 2003, the band got together again, playing several more shows around Seattle and writing several new songs. A live album, Live Seattle, WA 12/13/03, was released in 2003 through Kufala Recordings. An EP containing the new songs, Waiting... (again produced by Goodmanson), was released in 2004.

In 2021 the band secured the rights to their debut album, and it was re-released on digital platforms in January 2022.

== Band members ==
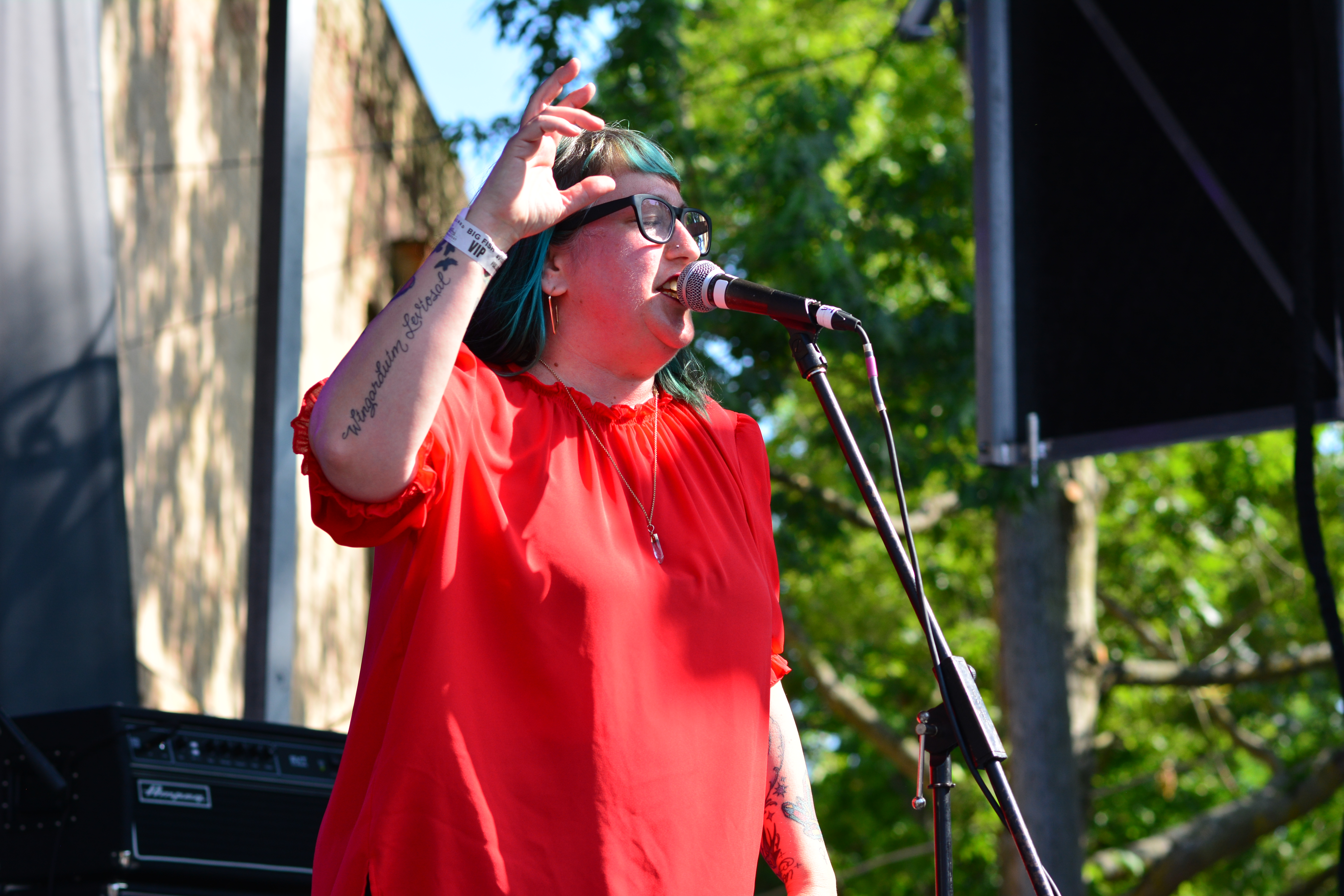
Singer Carrie Akre

- Carrie Akre – vocals
- Chris Friel – drums
- Rick Friel – bass
- Mike McCready – guitar
- Danny Newcomb – guitar

== Discography ==
=== Studio albums ===
Year	Album details
2000	The Rockfords: Released: February 1, 2000; Label: Epic; Format: CD

=== Live albums ===
Year	Album details
2003	Live Seattle, WA 12/13/03: Released: December 28, 2003; Label: Kufala; Format: 2-CD set

=== Extended plays ===
Year	Album details
2004	Waiting...: Released: January 2004; Label: Ten Club; Format: CD

=== Singles ===
Year	Single	Album
2000	"Silver Lining"	The Rockfords

=== Other appearances ===
Year	Song	Title	Label
2000	"Silver Lining"	Down to You: Music from the Miramax Motion Picture	Epic
