= Chloe Hunter =

American model and actress (born 1976)

- Born: August 26, 1976 (age 50); Thousand Oaks, California, United States
- Occupations: Model, Actress
- Years active: 1999–2008

Chloe Hunter (born August 26, 1976, Thousand Oaks, California) is an American model and actress best known for appearing in the 2002 film Spun, as well as having her exposed stomach and navel featured in the poster for the 1999 film American Beauty alongside the hand of then-model Christina Hendricks.

In her role in Spun, Hunter's character notably spent almost the entire film completely nude and tied spread-eagle to a bed. Her other acting appearances include minor roles in Leprechaun in the Hood, Down to You and For Heaven's Sake.

== Filmography ==
=== Film ===
Year	Title	Role	Notes
2000	Down to You	Megan Brodski	
2000	Leprechaun in the Hood	Waitress #2	
2002	Spun	April Love	
2008	For Heaven's Sake	Ginger Hotchner	
2008	Channels	Nicole	

=== Television ===
Year	Title	Role	Notes
1999	Shasta McNasty	Woman #1	Episode: "Angels in Lingerie Are Devils in Disguise"
2000	Malibu, CA	Claire	Episode: "Three Dudes and a Baby"
