= Invitation (Carrie Akre album) =

Studio album by Carrie Akre
- Released: August 6, 2002
- Genre: Alternative rock
- Length: 57:02
- Label: My Way Records
- Producer: Carrie Akre, Pat Gray

Carrie Akre chronology
Home (2000)	Invitation (2002)	...Last the Evening (2007)

Invitation is the second solo studio album by the American artist Carrie Akre.

== Track listing ==
1. "Play" – 4:29
2. "House at the End of the World" – 3:47
3. "Mystery" – 4:55
4. "Catch Me If You Can" – 3:50
5. "Heaven" – 6:42
6. "Wishing You Well" – 5:41
7. "Not Yet" – 4:51
8. "Hope" – 6:31
9. "Invitation" – 4:56
10. "Out There Tonight" – 3:16
11. "Only Me" – 5:36
12. "Catch My Back" – 2:28

== Personnel ==
- Carrie Akre – vocals, guitar, keyboards, vox organ
- Tim Dijulio – guitar
- Jason Harrod – guitar
- Pat Gray – bass, guitar
- Bill Palmer – violin
- Carl Miller – trombone
