= Sally Rowena Munt =

Sally Rowena Munt (born 1960) is a feminist academic and author. She has written several books including Murder by the Book: Feminism and the Crime Novel.

Munt grew up in Huddersfield, West Yorkshire, and was educated at the University of Southampton (B.A. English and Media Studies), the University of Sussex (M.A. Twentieth Century Literature and Culture, D.Phil. English Literature and Cultural Studies), the University of Brighton (M.Sc Cognitive Psychotherapy) and the Brighton and Sussex Medical School (PG Dip. Psychiatry).

Having worked at several British universities, including as senior lecturer in English and Cultural Studies at Nottingham Trent University, Munt is professor of Media and Cultural Studies at the University of Sussex. Her scholarship is concerned with gender/sexuality studies, class and cultural politics, and spatial theory. She is a Fellow of the Royal Society of Arts.

== Works ==
- New Lesbian Criticism: Literary and Cultural Readings (1992)
- Murder by the Book: Feminism and the Crime Novel (1994)
- Lesbian and Gay Studies: A Critical Introduction (1997)
- Heroic Desire: Lesbian Identity and Cultural Space (1998)
- Butch/Femme: Inside Lesbian Gender (1998)
- Cultural Studies and the Working Class: Subject to Change (2000)
- Technospaces: Inside the New Media (2001)
- Queer Attachments: The Cultural Politics of Shame (2007)
