= Spun =

2002 film by Jonas Åkerlund

- Theatrical release poster
- Directed by: Jonas Åkerlund
- Written by: William De Los Santos; Creighton Vero
- Produced by: Chris Hanley; Fernando Sulichin; Timothy Wayne Peternel; Danny Vinik
- Starring: Jason Schwartzman; John Leguizamo; Mena Suvari; Patrick Fugit; Peter Stormare; Alexis Arquette; Deborah Harry; Eric Roberts; Chloe Hunter; Nicholas Gonzalez; Brittany Murphy; Mickey Rourke
- Cinematography: Eric Broms
- Edited by: Jonas Åkerlund
- Music by: Billy Corgan
- Production companies: Silver Nitrate Films; Brink Films
- Distributed by: Newmarket Capital Group
- Release dates: June 14, 2002 (Las Vegas); January 17, 2003 (Sundance)
- Running time: 101 minutes
- Country: United States
- Language: English
- Budget: $2 million
- Box office: $1 million

Spun is a 2002 American black comedy crime drama film directed by Jonas Åkerlund from an original screenplay by William De Los Santos and Creighton Vero, based on three days of De Los Santos's life in the Eugene, Oregon drug subculture. It features an ensemble cast, including Jason Schwartzman, John Leguizamo, Mena Suvari, Patrick Fugit, Peter Stormare, Alexis Arquette, Deborah Harry, Rob Halford, Eric Roberts, Chloe Hunter, Nicholas Gonzalez, Brittany Murphy, and Mickey Rourke.

Åkerlund made his debut as a feature film director with Spun, having already become known for his work in music videos. The film was shot in 22 days, and centers on various people involved in a methamphetamine drug ring. The film blends elements of dark comedy and drama in its storytelling. Its title is a reference to the slang term for the way users feel after going multiple days without sleep while on a methamphetamine binge. The characters take a combined total of 23 "hits" during the course of the movie.

== Plot ==
College dropout Ross is a customer of Spider Mike, a methamphetamine dealer. Spider Mike and his girlfriend Cookie argue in their apartment while Ross strikes up a conversation with Nikki, a fellow addict, in the living room. Nikki takes Ross to meet her boyfriend, "The Cook", who supplies Spider Mike with drugs from a meth lab he has set up in a motel room. The Cook gives Ross a small amount of meth in exchange for bringing Nikki home, and says that he will get in touch with Ross if he needs a driver.

Back at his own apartment, Ross gets messages wishing him a happy birthday from his mother, and his former girlfriend, Amy. Ross sporadically calls Amy and leaves messages on her answering machine. He then goes to the local strip club while high, leading to an intense pornographic hallucination. He takes one of the dancers named April home and has sex with her in a variety of positions, the last of which leaves her tied to the bed naked.

As they finish, the Cook calls with an emergency regarding Nikki's dog, Taco, which needs to be taken to the veterinarian. April tells him to untie her but Ross, still high, duct-tapes April's eyes and mouth shut and leaves her bound to the bed, playing music to cover her gagged screams. Elsewhere, two policemen working with a TV crew raid the trailer where Frisbee (another one of Spider Mike's customers) lives, falsely believing that a meth lab is located there. They take Frisbee and his mother into custody and threaten him into helping them on a drug bust against Spider Mike.

After driving the Cook around town to buy ephedrine pills, beer, and pornography, Ross returns to his apartment and apologizes to the still-helpless April. The Cook orders a prostitute to his motel room, and when she shows up, he and Nikki argue and break up. Nikki calls Ross and asks him to take her to a bus station so she can go back to Las Vegas. Ross agrees, leaving April still tied to the bed.

While Ross and Nikki are out, Frisbee (now wearing a wire) visits Spider Mike to buy meth so the cops can arrest him. When he enters, Cookie attempts to seduce him as revenge for overhearing Spider Mike on a phone sex line, but she finds the wire. As the cops burst in, a furious Spider Mike shoots Frisbee in the testicles; Spider Mike and Cookie are both arrested, and Frisbee is taken to the hospital. After Ross and Nikki go back to his apartment and find April gone (rescued by his lesbian neighbor), Ross finally drops Nikki off at the bus station, where they share a kiss, and express their desire to reunite if he ever goes to Vegas.

Meanwhile, the Cook's meth lab catches fire and destroys the motel room; he flees to an adult film store, where he is arrested after the owner calls the police. Once the Cook makes bail, he calls Ross asking for a ride to another dealer's house in the city. Ross agrees so that he can see Amy, who also lives in the city. The dealer provides the Cook with cash, some meth, and the equipment to start a new lab.

The Cook promises Ross six months' worth of meth in exchange for being his chauffeur; he agrees on the condition that he can see Amy first. Amy, who has gotten her life together, wants nothing to do with him after seeing that he is clearly still using drugs and only has $100 of the $450 he owes her. As all the other characters go to sleep, the Cook drives a depressed Ross out to an old trailer in the countryside. Ross naps in his car as the Cook sets up a new lab in the trailer, only to blow it and himself up in the process.

== Cast ==
- Jason Schwartzman as Ross
- Mickey Rourke as The Cook
- Brittany Murphy as Nikki
- John Leguizamo as Spider Mike
- Mena Suvari as Cookie
- Patrick Fugit as Frisbee
- Peter Stormare as Mullet Cop
- Alexis Arquette as Moustache Cop
- Deborah Harry as The Neighbor
- Eric Roberts as The Man
- Chloe Hunter as April
- Nicholas Gonzalez as Angel
- Charlotte Ayanna as Amy

Cameos

- Larry Drake as Dr. K.
- Billy Corgan as The Doctor
- China Chow as The Prostitute
- Rob Halford as The Clerk
- Tony Kaye as The Strip Club Announcer
- Ron Jeremy as The Bartender
- Josh Peck as Fat Boy

== Production ==
=== Development ===
The screenplay for Spun was anchored on the real life experiences of William De Los Santos in 1996, who based the character of Ross on himself. De Los Santos had considered making a documentary about methamphetamine cooks in Eugene, Oregon, before becoming a meth addict himself. While in rehab, De Los Santos made a list of film producers before traveling to Los Angeles. He met producer Chris Hanley and production company Muse Films after sneaking into a party, and they agreed to produce Spun.

The project stalled when intended director Jonas Åkerlund was unable to start due to scheduling conflicts. Impatient, De Los Santos contacted Åkerlund through the internet, and convinced him to read his script and direct the film. Every character in the film (with the exception of the police officers, who were introduced to the story by Åkerlund) were based on people he had met. The plot point in which Ross leaves April tied to a bed to drive for The Cook and forgets about her also happened to De Los Santos, although in real life he only left her for three hours.

For the role of Nikki, Brittany Murphy had to learn how to pole dance in two hours at a local strip club in Los Angeles, bruising herself in the process. The club's owner then offered her a job, unaware of who she was. Murphy recalled she "was flattered... I had only had two hours of teaching. Though I was a dancer for 10 years.”

=== Filming ===
The film was shot over a period of 22 days.

== Reception ==
The film received mixed reactions, with some analysts remarking that the film added nothing new to the genre of drug movies. As of July 2020, the film holds a 37% approval rating on Rotten Tomatoes, based on 79 reviews with an average rating of 5.0/10. The website's critics consensus reads: "A chaotic drug movie that has little substance behind the stylistic flash." Metacritic, which uses a weighted average, assigned the film a score of 41 out of 100, based on 27 critics, indicating "mixed or average" reviews. Time Out London was particularly harsh, accusing the film of "smug amoralism", and claiming that Åkerlund had simply re-used other people's ideas and techniques. Mick LaSalle of the San Francisco Chronicle praised the films' opening 10 minutes as "a burst of energy, full of flash and subtlety, funny and brilliant...", praising Åkerlund as a "prodigious talent" for his editing, but ultimately found it to be in "the service of nothing", remarking that "plot complication and freneticism can't distract us from noticing that the movie has no insights, no point, no urgency and no importance."

Roger Ebert was more sympathetic in his review, where he described the film as having "effortless wickedness", giving it 3 out of 4 stars. His main appraisal was that the film in no way attempted to romanticize any of the characters, and further went on to say, "It's interesting how this story and these people seem to have been living before the movie began and will continue after it is over; instead of a plot, we drop in on their lives". Ebert does, however, explicitly mention the similarities between this and the earlier Requiem for a Dream.

== Soundtrack ==
The original music for Spun was written by Billy Corgan. The soundtrack to the film features songs by artists such as Iron Maiden and UFO (performed by The Djali Zwan), Ozzy Osbourne, Mötley Crüe, Blues Traveler, Bathory (for whom Åkerlund once briefly played drums), Richie Havens, Phantom Planet (with whom Jason Schwartzman played drums at the time), Per Gessle (half of Roxette), Paola and Satyricon, whose video for the song "Mother North" appears in the movie.
