= Carrie Akre =

American singer (born 1966)

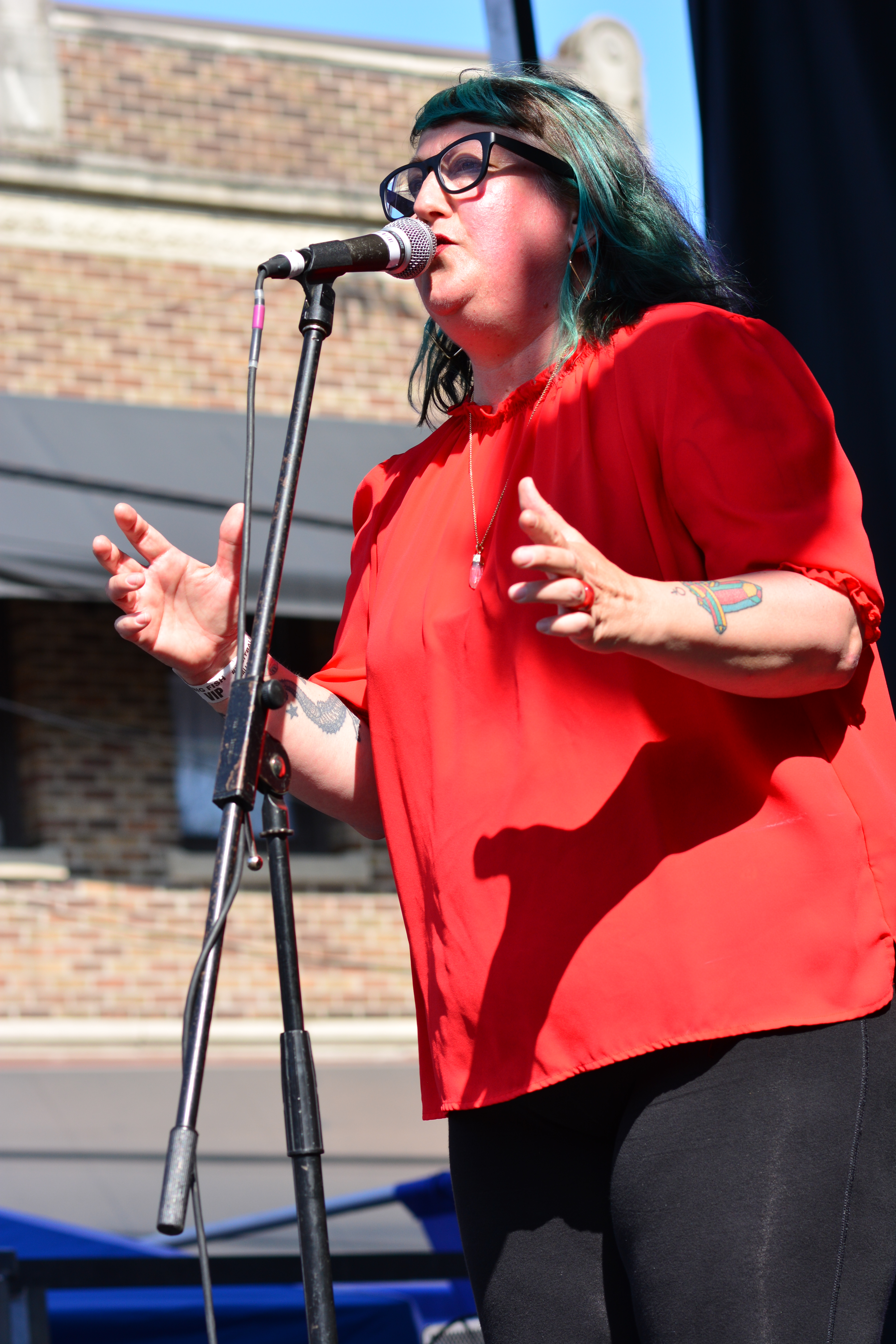
- Akre performing in 2019

Background information
- Born: September 24, 1966 (age 59)
- Genres: Alternative rock
- Occupations: Singer, songwriter
- Label: My Way
- Formerly of: Hammerbox; Goodness; The Rockfords

Carrie Akre (born September 24, 1966) is an American singer best known for her work with Seattle underground bands Hammerbox and Goodness.

Since Goodness disbanded in 1998, she has contributed vocals to the project band The Rockfords (which included Pearl Jam's Mike McCready on guitar) and released three solo albums. She releases albums on her own label, My Way Records.

== Solo discography ==
Title	Release	Label	Allmusic rating
Home	2000	Good-Ink Records	
Invitation	2002	My Way Records	4/5 stars
Live from Cafe Venus/Mars 7.23.03	2003	Kufala	
...Last the Evening	2007	Loveless Records	3.5/5 stars
