= List of songs recorded by Theory of a Deadman =

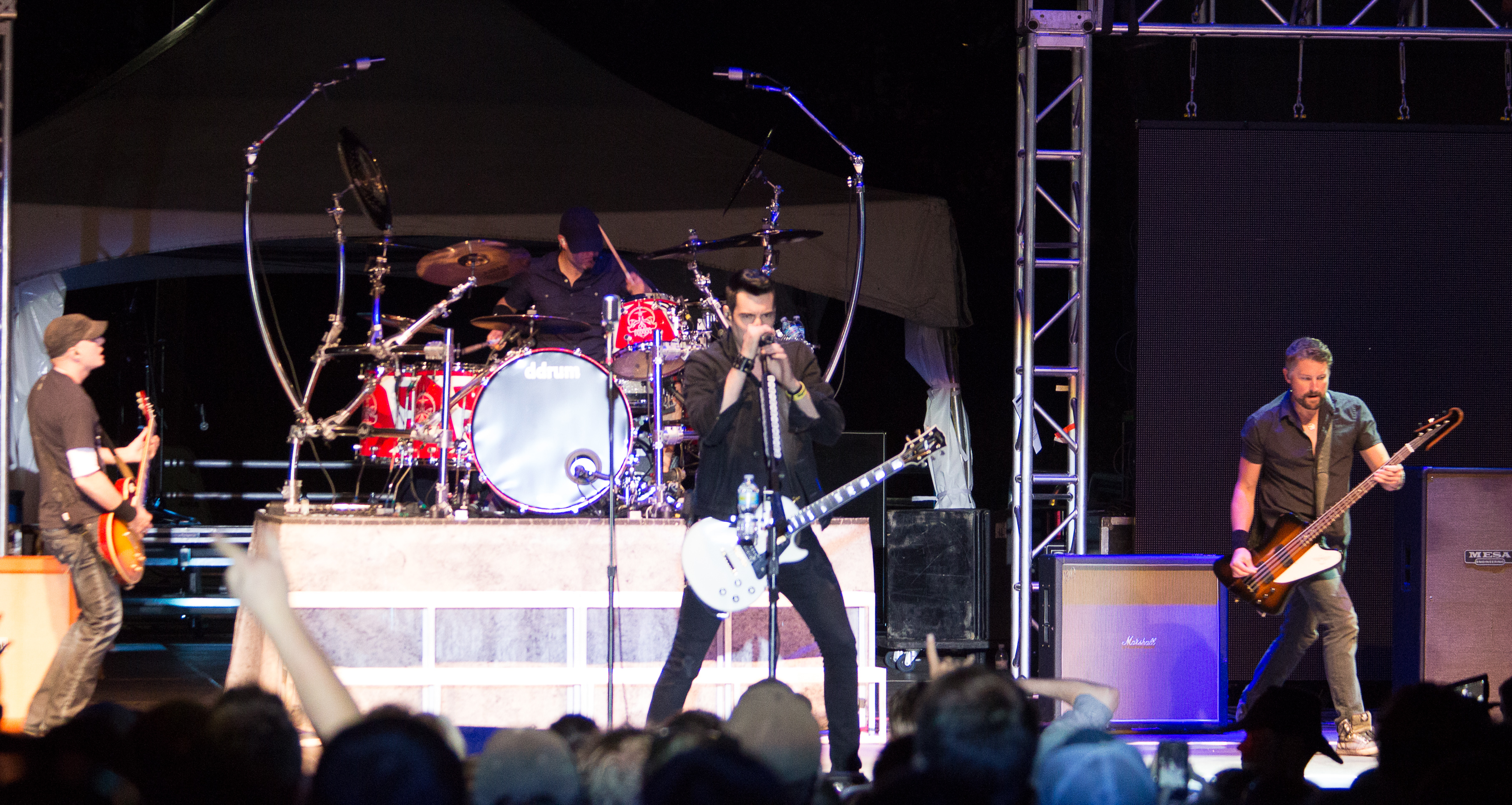
Theory of a Deadman performing in 2013.

Canadian rock band Theory of a Deadman has recorded material for seven studio albums and one extended play (EP), consisting of 90 original songs, 10 acoustic versions of original work, and 11 covers. The band was formed in 1999 in Delta, British Columbia, and signed a recording contract with Chad Kroeger's 604 Records in 2001. The group worked with Kroeger on their self-titled debut album which was released in September 2002. The band's name originated from the title of one of the album's recordings, which was later renamed "The Last Song".

Their second album, Gasoline (2005), spawned several tracks that were featured in 2005's video game Fahrenheit (also known as Indigo Prophecy). The band headed back to the recording studio in 2007 to work on Scars & Souvenirs (2008), which stayed on the Billboard 200 chart for 110 consecutive weeks while subsequent albums The Truth Is... (2011) and Savages (2014) peaked within the top 10 on the same chart. Three singles—"Bad Girlfriend", "Lowlife", and "Rx (Medicate)"—have reached the number one position on Billboard's Mainstream Rock chart. Of the band's 111 songs, 37 have been released as singles and some have appeared on soundtracks for films such as Transformers: Revenge of the Fallen (2009) and Transformers: Dark of the Moon (2011). The group has made nearly a dozen cover songs, including versions originally recorded by artists such as Sting and Lynyrd Skynyrd, as well as songs used for events for the WWE.

For their first five studio albums, Theory of a Deadman's music was a combination of post-grunge, hard rock, alternative rock, and alternative metal, blended with elements of country music. With the release of their sixth studio album, Wake Up Call (2017), the band reinvented themselves with a shift toward a genre that was aligned more with pop music, along with an abbreviated band name, Theory. The group is well known for lyrics that cover a range of topics. Songs like "Angel" and "Santa Monica" are ballads that talk about love and heartbreak, while "Blow", "Rx (Medicate)", and "History of Violence" concern issues that plague society. Because of its message of overcoming adversity, "Sacrifice" was chosen as the theme song for the United States Olympics team during the 2008 Summer Olympics in Beijing, China. Lead vocalist and guitarist, Tyler Connolly, is the band's primary lyricist, but all members have shared a collective part in the songwriting process. Four of the group's seven studio albums—along with an acoustic EP released in 2015—were produced by Howard Benson and his team in Los Angeles, California, while Wake Up Call and Say Nothing (2020) were recorded in London in a collaboration with Swedish producer Martin Terefe.

== Songs ==
Key
| † | Indicates songs released as a single |
| ‡ | Indicates songs recorded by Theory of a Deadman which are cover versions |
| # | Indicates songs recorded by Theory of a Deadman which are cover versions and also released as a single. |

| Song | Writer(s) | Album(s) | Year | Ref. |
|---|---|---|---|---|
| "Above This" | Tyler Connolly; Chad Kroeger | Theory of a Deadman | 2002 | |
| "Affluenza" | Tyler Connolly; Dave Brenner; Dean Back; Joe Dandeneau; Christine Connolly | Say Nothing | 2020 | |
| "All or Nothing" † | Tyler Connolly | Scars & Souvenirs | 2008 | |
| "Angel" † | Tyler Connolly; Dave Brenner; Dean Back; Joe Dandeneau; Jennifer Decilveo | Savages | 2014 | |
| "Angel (Acoustic)" | Tyler Connolly; Dave Brenner; Dean Back; Joe Dandeneau; Jennifer Decilveo | Angel Acoustic EP | 2015 | |
| "Any Other Way" | Tyler Connolly | Theory of a Deadman | 2002 | |
| "Bad Girlfriend" † | Tyler Connolly; Christine Connolly | Scars & Souvenirs | 2008 | |
| "Better Off" † | Tyler Connolly; Dave Brenner; Dean Back | Gasoline | 2005 | |
| "Better or Worse" | Tyler Connolly; Dave Brenner; Dean Back; Joe Dandeneau | The Truth Is... | 2011 | |
| "Bitch Came Back" † | Tyler Connolly; Dave Brenner; Dean Back; Joe Dandeneau; Kara DioGuardi | The Truth Is... | 2011 | |
| "Black Hole in Your Heart" | Tyler Connolly; Dave Brenner; Dean Back; Joe Dandeneau; Christine Connolly | Say Nothing | 2020 | |
| "Blow" † | Tyler Connolly; Dave Brenner; Dean Back; Joe Dandeneau; Kara DioGuardi | Savages | 2014 | |
| "By the Way" † Theory of a Deadman featuring Daughtry | Tyler Connolly; Chris Daughtry | Scars & Souvenirs | 2008 | |
| "By the Way (Acoustic)" | Tyler Connolly; Chris Daughtry | Scars & Souvenirs | 2008 | |
| "Careless" | Tyler Connolly; Dave Brenner; Dean Back; Joe Dandeneau | The Truth Is... | 2011 | |
| "Cold Water" # | Ed Sheeran; Benjamin Levin; Karen Marie Ørsted; Thomas Pentz; Justin Bieber; Jamie Scott; Philip Meckseper; Henry Allen | Single release only | 2017 | |
| "Confession" | Tyler Connolly; Chad Kroeger | Theory of a Deadman | 2002 | |
| "Crutch" | Tyler Connolly; Christine Connolly | Scars & Souvenirs | 2008 | |
| "Deadly Game" ‡ | Jim Johnston | WWE Wreckless Intent | 2006 | |
| "Does It Really Matter" | Tyler Connolly; Dave Brenner; Dean Back; Joe Dandeneau; Christine Connolly | The Truth Is... | 2011 | |
| "Drag Me to Hell" | Tyler Connolly; Dave Brenner; Dean Back; Joe Dandeneau | The Truth Is... | 2011 | |
| "Drown" † | Tyler Connolly; Dave Brenner; Dean Back; Joe Dandeneau | Savages | 2014 | |
| "Easy to Love You" † | Tyler Connolly; Dave Brenner; Dean Back; Joe Dandeneau | The Truth Is... | 2011 | |
| "Easy to Love You (Acoustic)" | Tyler Connolly; Dave Brenner; Dean Back; Joe Dandeneau | The Truth Is... | 2011 | |
| "Echoes" | Tyler Connolly; Dave Brenner; Dean Back; Joe Dandeneau | Wake Up Call | 2017 | |
| "End of the Summer" † | Tyler Connolly; Zac Maloy | Scars & Souvenirs | 2008 | |
| "G.O.A.T." | Tyler Connolly; Dave Brenner; Dean Back; Joe Dandeneau | Wake Up Call | 2017 | |
| "Gentleman" † | Tyler Connolly; Dave Brenner; Dean Back; Joe Dandeneau; Kara DioGuardi | The Truth Is... | 2011 | |
| "Gentleman (Acoustic)" | Tyler Connolly; Dave Brenner; Dean Back; Joe Dandeneau; Kara DioGuardi | The Truth Is... | 2011 | |
| "Glass Jaw" | Tyler Connolly; Dave Brenner; Dean Back; Joe Dandeneau | Wake Up Call | 2017 | |
| "Got It Made" | Tyler Connolly | Scars & Souvenirs | 2008 | |
| "Got Me Wrong" ‡ | Jerry Cantrell | Gasoline | 2005 | |
| "Great Pretender" | Tyler Connolly | Scars & Souvenirs | 2008 | |
| "Habits (Stay High)" ‡ | Tove Lo; Ludvig Söderberg; Jakob Jerlström | Angel Acoustic EP | 2015 | |
| "Hallelujah" # | Leonard Cohen | Single release only | 2016 | |
| "Hate My Life" † | Tyler Connolly; Christine Connolly | Scars & Souvenirs | 2008 | |
| "Hating Hollywood" | Tyler Connolly; Dave Brenner; Dean Back | Gasoline | 2005 | |
| "Head Above Water" † | Tyler Connolly; Scott Stevens | The Truth Is... | 2011 | |
| "Heaven (Little by Little)" | Tyler Connolly; Christine Connolly | Scars & Souvenirs | 2008 | |
| "Heavy" | Tyler Connolly; Dave Brenner; Dean Back; Joe Dandeneau; Christine Connolly | Savages | 2014 | |
| "Hell Just Ain't the Same" | Tyler Connolly | Gasoline | 2005 | |
| "Hello Lonely (Walk Away from This)" † | Tyler Connolly; Dave Brenner; Dean Back | Gasoline | 2005 | |
| "History of Violence" † | Tyler Connolly; Dave Brenner; Dean Back; Joe Dandeneau; Christine Connolly | Say Nothing | 2020 | |
| "Hurricane" † | Tyler Connolly; Kara DioGuardi | The Truth Is... | 2011 | |
| "In Ruins" | Tyler Connolly; Christine Connolly | Savages | 2014 | |
| "In the Middle" | Tyler Connolly; Dave Brenner; Dean Back | Gasoline | 2005 | |
| "Inside" | Tyler Connolly; Chad Kroeger | Theory of a Deadman | 2002 | |
| "Invisible Man" | Tyler Connolly; Chad Kroeger | Theory of a Deadman | 2002 | |
| "It's All Good" | Tyler Connolly; Dave Brenner; Dean Back; Joe Dandeneau | Say Nothing | 2020 | |
| "The Last Song" † | Tyler Connolly; Chad Kroeger | Theory of a Deadman | 2002 | |
| "Leg to Stand On" | Tyler Connolly | Theory of a Deadman | 2002 | |
| "Little Smirk" † | Tyler Connolly; Christine Connolly | Scars & Souvenirs | 2008 | |
| "Livin' My Life Like a Country Song" Theory of a Deadman featuring Joe Don Rooney | Tyler Connolly; Christine Connolly; Scott Stevens | Savages | 2014 | |
| "Loner" | Tyler Connolly; Christine Connolly | Wake Up Call | 2017 | |
| "Love Is Hell" | Tyler Connolly; Dave Brenner; Dean Back; Joe Dandeneau; Nina Ossoff; Kathy Sommer; Dana Calitri | The Truth Is... | 2011 | |
| "Lowlife" † | Tyler Connolly; Dave Brenner; Dean Back; Joe Dandeneau; Christine Connolly | The Truth Is... | 2011 | |
| "Lowlife (Acoustic)" | Tyler Connolly; Dave Brenner; Dean Back; Joe Dandeneau; Christine Connolly | The Truth Is... | 2011 | |
| "Lynchburg Lemonade (Southern Days)" | Tyler Connolly; Dave Brenner; Dean Back | Gasoline | 2005 | |
| "Make Up Your Mind" † | Tyler Connolly; Chad Kroeger | Theory of a Deadman | 2002 | |
| "Me & My Girl" | Tyler Connolly; Dave Brenner; Dean Back | Gasoline | 2005 | |
| "Midnight Rider" ‡ | Gregg Allman; Robert Payne | Theory of a Deadman | 2002 | |
| "Misery of Mankind" | Tyler Connolly; Dave Brenner; Dean Back; Joe Dandeneau | Savages | 2014 | |
| "No Chance in Hell" ‡ | Jim Johnston | WWE The Music, Vol. 8 | 2008 | |
| "No Surprise" † | Tyler Connolly; Dave Brenner; Dean Back | Gasoline | 2005 | |
| "No Way Out" | Tyler Connolly; Dave Brenner; Dean Back | Gasoline | 2005 | |
| "Not Meant to Be" † | Tyler Connolly; Kara DioGuardi | Scars & Souvenirs | 2008 | |
| "Not Meant to Be (Acoustic)" | Tyler Connolly; Kara DioGuardi | Angel Acoustic EP | 2015 | |
| "Nothing Could Come Between Us" † | Tyler Connolly | Theory of a Deadman | 2002 | |
| "The One" | Tyler Connolly; Cristi Vaughan | Savages | 2014 | |
| "The One (Acoustic)" | Tyler Connolly; Cristi Vaughan | Angel Acoustic EP | 2015 | |
| "Out of My Head" † | Tyler Connolly; Brett James | The Truth Is... | 2011 | |
| "Out of My Head (Acoustic)" | Tyler Connolly; Brett James | The Truth Is... | 2011 | |
| "Panic Room" | Tyler Connolly; Christine Connolly | Savages | 2014 | |
| "PCH" | Tyler Connolly; Dave Brenner; Dean Back; Joe Dandeneau | Wake Up Call | 2017 | |
| "Po Mouth" | Tyler Connolly; Dave Brenner; Dean Back; Joe Dandeneau | Wake Up Call | 2017 | |
| "Point to Prove" † | Tyler Connolly; Chad Kroeger | Theory of a Deadman | 2002 | |
| "Quicksand" | Tyler Connolly; Dave Brenner; Dean Back; Joe Dandeneau; Christine Connolly | Say Nothing | 2020 | |
| "Quiver" | Tyler Connolly; Dave Brenner; Dean Back | Gasoline | 2005 | |
| "Rx" (Note: According to the album liner notes of Wake Up Call, the song was originally titled "Rx"; the band decided to change the title after discovering that fans were searching for a song called "Medicate" upon its release.) † | Tyler Connolly; Dave Brenner; Dean Back; Joe Dandeneau | Wake Up Call | 2017 | |
| "Sacrifice" | Tyler Connolly | Scars & Souvenirs | 2008 | |
| "Salt in the Wound" | Tyler Connolly; Dave Brenner; Dean Back; Joe Dandeneau; Christine Connolly | Savages | 2014 | |
| "Santa Monica" † | Tyler Connolly; Dave Brenner; Dean Back | Gasoline | 2005 | |
| "Santa Monica (Acoustic)" | Tyler Connolly; Dave Brenner; Dean Back | Angel Acoustic EP | 2015 | |
| "Savages" † Theory of a Deadman featuring Alice Cooper | Tyler Connolly; Dave Brenner; Dean Back; Joe Dandeneau; Christine Connolly | Savages | 2014 | |
| "Save the Best for Last" | Tyler Connolly; Dave Brenner; Dean Back | Gasoline | 2005 | |
| "Say Goodbye" † | Tyler Connolly; Dave Brenner; Dean Back | Gasoline | 2005 | |
| "Say I'm Sorry" | Tyler Connolly; Chad Kroeger | Theory of a Deadman | 2002 | |
| "Say Nothing" | Tyler Connolly; Dave Brenner; Dean Back; Joe Dandeneau; Christine Connolly | Say Nothing | 2020 | |
| "Shadow" | Tyler Connolly | Scars & Souvenirs | 2008 | |
| "Shape of My Heart" # | Sting; Dominic Miller | Single release only | 2017 | |
| "Shoot to Thrill" ‡ | Angus Young; Malcolm Young; Brian Johnson | Unreleased | N/A | (Note: Theory of a Deadman's cover version of "Shoot to Thrill" was set to be released on the soundtrack for The Avengers, but was removed for unknown reasons.) |
| "Since You've Been Gone" † | Tyler Connolly; Dave Brenner; Dean Back | Gasoline | 2005 | |
| "So Happy" † | Tyler Connolly | Scars & Souvenirs | 2008 | |
| "So Happy (Acoustic)" | Tyler Connolly | Scars & Souvenirs | 2008 | |
| "Straight Jacket" † | Tyler Connolly; Dave Brenner; Dean Back; Joe Dandeneau | Wake Up Call | 2017 | |
| "Strangers" | Tyler Connolly; Dave Brenner; Dean Back; Joe Dandeneau; Christine Connolly | Say Nothing | 2020 | |
| "The Sun Has Set on Me" | Tyler Connolly; Dave Brenner; Dean Back; Joe Dandeneau | Savages | 2014 | |
| "Ted Bundy" | Tyler Connolly; Dave Brenner; Dean Back; Joe Dandeneau | Say Nothing | 2020 | |
| "Time Machine" | Tyler Connolly; Christine Connolly; Louis Biancaniello | Wake Up Call | 2017 | |
| "The Truth Is... (I Lied About Everything)" | Tyler Connolly; Dave Brenner; Dean Back; Joe Dandeneau; Christine Connolly | The Truth Is... | 2011 | |
| "Villain" | Tyler Connolly; Dave Brenner; Dean Back; Joe Dandeneau | The Truth Is... | 2011 | |
| "Wait for Me" † | Tyler Connolly | Scars & Souvenirs | 2008 | |
| "Wake Up Call" | Tyler Connolly; Christine Connolly; Peter M. Amato | Wake Up Call | 2017 | |
| "We Were Men" | Tyler Connolly; Dave Brenner; Dean Back; Joe Dandeneau | The Truth Is... | 2011 | |
| "What Was I Thinking" | Tyler Connolly; Dave Brenner; Dean Back; Joe Dandeneau; Christine Connolly | The Truth Is... | 2011 | |
| "What You Deserve" | Tyler Connolly | Theory of a Deadman | 2002 | |
| "What's Your Name" ‡ | Ronnie Van Zant; Gary Rossington | Gasoline | 2005 | |
| "White Boy" | Tyler Connolly; Dave Brenner; Dean Back; Joe Dandeneau | Say Nothing | 2020 | |
| "Wicked Game" # | Chris Isaak | Wake Up Call | 2017 | |
| "World Keeps Spinning" | Tyler Connolly; Dave Brenner; Dean Back; Joe Dandeneau | Say Nothing | 2020 | |
| "World War Me" | Tyler Connolly; Dave Brenner; Dean Back; Joe Dandeneau; Johnny Andrews | Savages | 2014 | |
