= Theory of a Deadman discography =

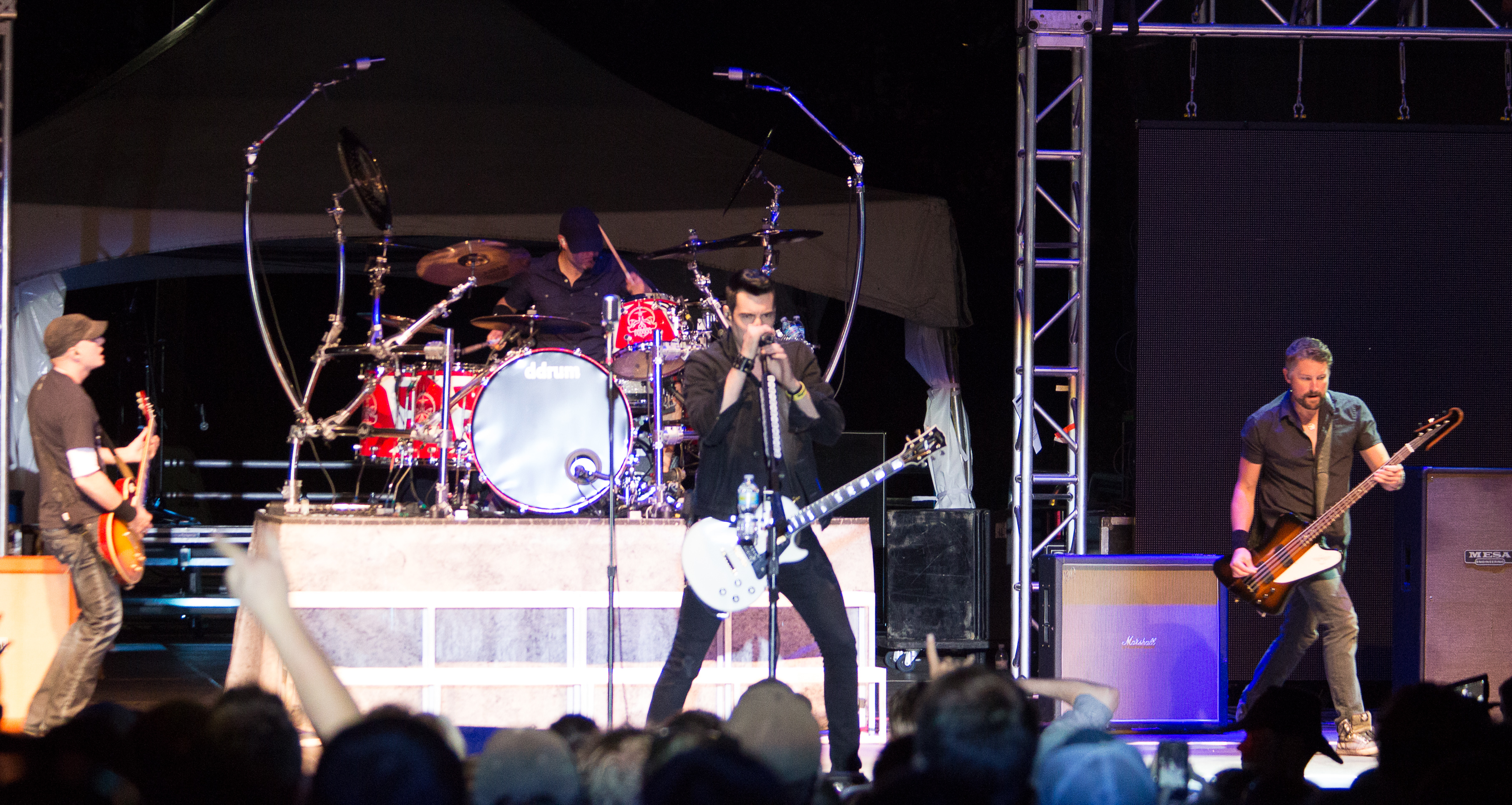
- Theory of a Deadman performing at the 2013 Festival of Friends
- Studio albums: 8
- Extended plays: 2
- Singles: 38
- Music videos: 27

The Canadian rock band Theory of a Deadman has released eight studio albums, two EPs, thirty-seven singles, and twenty-six music videos. The band was formed in 1999 in Delta, British Columbia, by Tyler Connolly (lead vocals and guitars), Dave Brenner (guitar), Dean Back (bass), and former member Tim Hart (drums). They had been through multiple drummers before recruiting current member Joey Dandeneau in 2009.

Nickelback's Chad Kroeger signed the group to his record label, 604 Records, in 2001 after Connolly gave Kroeger's ex-girlfriend a copy of their demo, and the following year, Theory of a Deadman released their eponymous debut album. The record was certified platinum by Music Canada (MC; formerly known as the Canadian Recording Industry Association) and peaked at numbers four and eighty-five on the Billboard Canadian Albums and US Billboard 200 charts, respectively. Their next album, Gasoline, was released in 2005.

In 2008, the band released their third studio album, Scars & Souvenirs, which spawned several successful singles, including "Not Meant to Be", "Bad Girlfriend", "All or Nothing", and "Hate My Life". Three of these songs were on the Billboard Hot 100 and have been the only singles to be seen on this particular chart. The album was certified platinum by both MC and the Recording Industry Association of America (RIAA), and was on the Billboard 200 chart for 110 weeks, peaking at number twenty-six. It also won the Western Canadian Music Award for "Rock Recording of the Year" in 2009.

Subsequent albums The Truth Is... (2011) and Savages (2014) both peaked on the Billboard 200 at number eight and appeared on the UK Albums chart, reaching numbers 68 and 41, respectively. The band recorded their first EP, Angel Acoustic EP, in 2015. Wake Up Call was released in October 2017 with the lead single, "Rx (Medicate)" (a song addressing the opioid epidemic in Canada and the United States), reaching number one on the Billboard Mainstream Rock chart and earning a "No. 1 Song Award" from the Society of Composers, Authors and Music Publishers of Canada (SOCAN).

The band released their thirty-seventh single "History of Violence" in 2019, and announced a release date of January 31, 2020, for their seventh studio album Say Nothing.

== Studio albums ==
List of studio albums, with selected chart positions, sales figures and certifications
Title	Album details	Peak chart positions					Certifications
Title	Album details	CAN	US	US Rock	US Alt	UK	Certifications
Theory of a Deadman	Released: September 17, 2002; Label: 604, Roadrunner, Island Def Jam; Format: CD, LP, digital download	4	85	—	—	—	MC: Platinum
Gasoline	Released: March 29, 2005; Label: 604, Roadrunner, Island Def Jam; Format: CD, LP, digital download	10	58	—	—	—	MC: Platinum
Scars & Souvenirs	Released: April 1, 2008; Label: 604, Roadrunner, Warner; Format: CD, CD+DVD, LP, digital download	2	26	6	5	—	MC: 2× Platinum; RIAA: 2× Platinum
The Truth Is...	Released: July 12, 2011; Label: 604, Roadrunner, Warner; Format: CD, LP, digital download	2	8	2	2	68	MC: Gold; RIAA: Gold
Savages	Released: July 29, 2014; Label: 604, Roadrunner, Warner; Format: CD, LP, digital download	4	8	4	1	41	MC: Gold
Wake Up Call	Released: October 27, 2017; Label: 604, Roadrunner, Atlantic; Format: CD, digital download	13	24	5	4	—	MC: Gold; RIAA: Gold
Say Nothing	Released: January 31, 2020; Label: 604, Roadrunner, Atlantic; Format: CD, digital download, streaming	51	116	14	5	—	
Dinosaur	Released: March 17, 2023; Label: 604, Roadrunner, Atlantic; Format: CD, digital download, streaming	—	—	—	—	—	
"—" denotes a recording that did not chart or was not released in that territory.

== EPs ==
List of extended plays (EPs)
Title	EP details
Angel Acoustic EP	Released: April 28, 2015; Label: 604, Roadrunner; Format: EP, digital download
Part 1: Funeral Songs	Released: September 4, 2026; Label: ONErpm; Format: CD, EP, digital download

== Singles ==
=== 2000s ===
List of singles as lead artist, with selected chart positions and certifications, showing year released and album name
Song	Year	Peak chart positions								Certifications	Album
Song	Year	CAN	CAN Rock	US	US Alt	US Main	US Rock	US Hard Rock Digi.	UK	Certifications	Album
"Nothing Could Come Between Us"	2002	2	—	—	—	8	—	—	—		Theory of a Deadman
"Make Up Your Mind"	2003	13	—	—	38	13	—	—	—		Theory of a Deadman
"No Surprise"	2005	—	1	—	24	8	—	—	—		Gasoline
"Say Goodbye"	2005	—	—	—	—	22	—	—	—		Gasoline
"Santa Monica"	2005	17	3	—	—	27	—	—	—	MC: 2× Platinum	Gasoline
"Hello Lonely (Walk Away from This)"	2005	—	—	—	—	30	—	—	—		Gasoline
"Better Off"	2005	86	7	—	—	—	—	—	—		Gasoline
"So Happy"	2008	58	4	—	17	2	—	—	—		Scars & Souvenirs
"Bad Girlfriend"	2008	42	3	75	8	1	—	6	—	MC: 2× Platinum; RIAA: 3× Platinum	Scars & Souvenirs
"All or Nothing"	2008	22	—	99	—	—	— (Note: "All or Nothing" did not enter the Hot Rock Songs chart, but peaked at number 17 on the Rock Digital Song Sales component chart.)	—	—	MC: Platinum; RIAA: Gold	Scars & Souvenirs
"Hate My Life"	2008	65	8	— (Note: "Hate My Life" did not enter the Billboard Hot 100, but peaked at number 7 on the Bubbling Under Hot 100 Singles chart.)	22	3	26	—	92	MC: Platinum; RIAA: Platinum	Scars & Souvenirs
"Not Meant to Be"	2008	53	18	55	—	—	—	—	—	MC: Platinum; RIAA: 2× Platinum	Scars & Souvenirs
"By the Way"	2009	—	17	—	—	16	34	—	—		Scars & Souvenirs
"—" denotes releases that did not chart or were not released in that region.

=== 2010s ===
List of singles as lead artist, with selected chart positions and certifications, showing year released and album name
Song	Year	Peak chart positions							Certifications	Album
Song	Year	CAN	CAN Rock	US	US Alt	US Main	US Rock	US Hard Rock Digi.	Certifications	Album
"Little Smirk"	2010	—	9	—	—	15	33	—		Scars & Souvenirs
"Lowlife"	2011	55	6	— (Note: "Lowlife" did not enter the Billboard Hot 100, but peaked at number 14 on the Bubbling Under Hot 100 Singles chart.)	25	1	4	5	MC: Platinum; RIAA: Gold	The Truth Is...
"Bitch Came Back"	2011	—	50	—	40	14	30	4	MC: Platinum; RIAA: Platinum	The Truth Is...
"Hurricane"	2012	—	11	—	—	5	22	3		The Truth Is...
"Gentleman"	2012	—	—	—	—	27	—	—		The Truth Is...
"Drown"	2014	—	7	—	—	4	43	—		Savages
"Savages" (featuring Alice Cooper)	2014	—	—	—	—	25	—	—		Savages
"Angel"	2015	—	33	—	—	2	29	—	MC: Platinum; RIAA: Platinum	Savages
"Blow"	2015	—	—	—	—	12	— (Note: "Blow" did not enter the Hot Rock Songs chart, but peaked at number 35 on the Rock Digital Song Sales component chart.)	—		Savages
"Rx (Medicate)"	2017	86	4	— (Note: "Rx (Medicate)" did not enter the Billboard Hot 100, but peaked at number 10 on the Bubbling Under Hot 100 Singles chart.)	28	1	4	—	MC: 4× Platinum; RIAA: 3× Platinum; RMNZ: Gold	Wake Up Call
"Straight Jacket"	2018	—	33	—	—	12	—	—		Wake Up Call
"History of Violence"	2019	—	15	—	—	1	15	—		Say Nothing
"—" denotes releases that did not chart or were not released in that region.

=== 2020s ===
List of singles as lead artist, with selected chart positions and certifications, showing year released and album name
Song	Year	Peak chart positions			Album
Song	Year	CAN Rock	US Main	US Hard Rock	Album
"World Keeps Spinning"	2020	30	13	—	Say Nothing
"Strangers" (original or featuring Zero 9:36)	2020	—	20	—	Say Nothing
"Dinosaur"	2022	23	10	22	Dinosaur
"Two of Us (Stuck)"	2023	—	34	—	Dinosaur
"Livin' My Life Like a Country Song" (Reimagined) (feat. Cory Marks)	2024	—	—	—	Non-album single
"Barricade"	2026	7	38	—	Part 1: Funeral Songs
"Winnebago (Lay Low)"	2026	—	21	—	Part 1: Funeral Songs
"—" denotes releases that did not chart or were not released in that region.

=== Promotional singles ===
List of singles as lead artist, with selected chart positions and certifications, showing year released and album name
Song	Year	Peak chart positions	Certifications	Album
Song	Year	US Adult	Certifications	Album
"Point to Prove"	2003	—		Theory of a Deadman
"The Last Song"	2003	—		Theory of a Deadman
"Leg To Stand On"	2003	—		Theory of a Deadman
"Since You've Been Gone"	2006	—		Gasoline
"Wait for Me"	2009	30		Scars & Souvenirs
"Crutch"	2009	—		Scars & Souvenirs
"Sacrifice"	2009	—		Scars & Souvenirs
"End of the Summer"	2010	—		Scars & Souvenirs
"Out of My Head"	2011	28		The Truth Is...
"The Truth Is... (I Lied About Everything)"	2011	—		The Truth Is...
"Head Above Water"	2012	—		The Truth Is...
"Easy to Love You"	2012	—		The Truth Is...
"Misery of Mankind"	2014	—		Savages
"Livin' My Life Like a Country Song" (feat. Joe Don Rooney)	2014	—		Savages
"In Ruins"	2014	—		Savages
"The Sun Has Set on Me"	2014	—		Savages
"Hallelujah" (Note: Cover of Leonard Cohen's song, "Hallelujah".)	2016	—		Non-album singles
"Shape of My Heart" (Note: Cover of Sting's song, "Shape of My Heart".)	2017	—		Non-album singles
"Cold Water" (Note: Cover of Major Lazer's song, "Cold Water".)	2017	—		Non-album singles
"Echoes"	2017	—		Wake Up Call
"Wake Up Call"	2017	—	RIAA: Gold	Wake Up Call
"Time Machine"	2017	—		Wake Up Call
"Wicked Game" (Note: Cover of Chris Isaak's song, "Wicked Game".)	2018	—		Wake Up Call
"PCH"	2018	—		Wake Up Call
"Say Nothing"	2019	—		Say Nothing
"Ambulance"	2023	—		Dinosaur
"Funeral Song"	2026	—		Part 1: Funeral Songs

== Music videos ==
Selected music videos
Year	Song	Album	Director(s)	Ref.
2002	"Nothing Could Come Between Us"	Theory of a Deadman	Glenn Bennett	
2003	"Make Up Your Mind"	Theory of a Deadman	Gregory Dark	
2003	"Point to Prove"	Theory of a Deadman	Unknown	
2005	"No Surprise"	Gasoline	Dan Rush	
2005	"Santa Monica"	Gasoline	Kyle Davison	
2006	"Since You've Been Gone"	Gasoline	Unknown	
2008	"So Happy"	Scars & Souvenirs	Colin Minihan	
2008	"Bad Girlfriend"	Scars & Souvenirs	Colin Minihan	
2008	"All or Nothing"	Scars & Souvenirs	Davin Black	
2009	"Hate My Life"	Scars & Souvenirs	Bill Fishman	
2009	"Not Meant to Be"	Scars & Souvenirs	Tony Petrossian	
2009	"By the Way"	Scars & Souvenirs	Paul Boyd	
2011	"Lowlife"	The Truth Is...	Paul Boyd	
2011	"Bitch Came Back"	The Truth Is...	Bill Fishman	
2011	"Hurricane"	The Truth Is...	Bill Fishman	
2012	"Easy to Love You"	The Truth Is...	John Poliquin	
2014	"Drown"	Savages	Rich Ragsdale	
2014	"Savages"	Savages	Rich Ragsdale	
2014	"Angel"	Savages	Rich Ragsdale	
2015	"Blow"	Savages	Tony Corella	
2017	"Rx (Medicate)"	Wake Up Call	Maria Juranic	
2017	"Echoes"	Wake Up Call	Kenlon Clark	
2018	"Straight Jacket"	Wake Up Call	Iqbal Ahmed	
2018	"PCH"	Wake Up Call	Ryan Sheehy	
2018	"Wake Up Call"	Wake Up Call	Unknown	
2019	"History of Violence"	Say Nothing	Sam Sulam	
2020	"World Keeps Spinning"	Say Nothing	Sam Sulam	
2022	"Dinosaur"	Dinosaur	Tony Corella	
2023	"Two Of Us (Stuck)"	Dinosaur	Unknown	
2026	"Winnebago (Lay Low)"	Part 1: Funeral Songs	Unknown	
2026	"Monster Truck"	Part 1: Funeral Songs	Unknown	
