= Angel Acoustic EP =

EP by Theory of a Deadman
- Released: April 28, 2015
- Recorded: 2014–2015
- Genre: Acoustic rock, post-grunge
- Length: 19:49
- Label: Roadrunner Records, 604 Records
- Producer: Howard Benson

Theory of a Deadman chronology
Savages (2014)	Angel Acoustic EP (2015)	Wake Up Call (2017)

Angel Acoustic EP is a five-track acoustic EP released by the Canadian rock band Theory of a Deadman on April 28, 2015.

== Production ==
While out on tour supporting their 2014 album Savages, the band began recording the EP in the last quarter of 2014 up till the first quarter of 2015.

The EP contains four previously released songs — "Angel" from Savages (2014), "Santa Monica" from Gasoline (2005), "Not Meant to Be" from Scars & Souvenirs (2008) and "The One" from Savages — and one newly recorded song titled "Habits (Stay High)" which is a cover of a Tove Lo song.

== Track listing ==
No.	Title	Length
1.	"Angel (Acoustic)"	3:22
2.	"Santa Monica (Acoustic)"	4:08
3.	"Habits (Stay High) (Acoustic)"	3:34
4.	"Not Meant to Be (Acoustic)"	3:31
5.	"The One (Acoustic)"	4:14

== Personnel ==
- Tyler Connolly
- Dean Back
- Dave Brenner
- Joey Dandeneau
