= List of number-one rock singles of 2005 (Canada) =

The following lists the number one rock singles in Canada in 2005 based on airplay from Mediabase which was published in Radio & Records magazine.

== Chart history ==
Issue date	Song	Artist(s)	Ref.
January 7	"Boulevard of Broken Dreams"	Green Day	
January 14	"Boulevard of Broken Dreams"	Green Day	
January 21	"Boulevard of Broken Dreams"	Green Day	
January 28	"Boulevard of Broken Dreams"	Green Day	
February 4	"Boulevard of Broken Dreams"	Green Day	
February 11	"Boulevard of Broken Dreams"	Green Day	
February 18	"All Because of You"	U2	
February 25	"All Because of You"	U2	
March 4	"All Because of You"	U2	
March 11	"All Because of You"	U2	
March 18	"All Because of You"	U2	
March 25	"All Because of You"	U2	
April 1	"No Surprise"	Theory of a Deadman	
April 8	"Be Yourself"	Audioslave	
April 15	"Be Yourself"	Audioslave	
April 22	"Be Yourself"	Audioslave	
April 29	"Be Yourself"	Audioslave	
May 6	"Be Yourself"	Audioslave	
May 13	"Be Yourself"	Audioslave	
May 20	"Be Yourself"	Audioslave	
May 27	"Be Yourself"	Audioslave	
June 3	"Be Yourself"	Audioslave	
June 10	"Speed of Sound"	Coldplay	
June 17	"Speed of Sound"	Coldplay	
June 24	"Speed of Sound"	Coldplay	
July 1	"Speed of Sound"	Coldplay	
July 8	"Best of You"	Foo Fighters	
July 15	"Best of You"	Foo Fighters	
July 22	"Speed of Sound"	Coldplay	
July 29	"Speed of Sound"	Coldplay	
August 5	"Best of You"	Foo Fighters	
August 12	"Best of You"	Foo Fighters	
August 19	"All These Things That I've Done"	The Killers	
August 26	"All These Things That I've Done"	The Killers	
September 2	"Wake Me Up When September Ends"	Green Day	
September 9	"Wake Me Up When September Ends"	Green Day	
September 16	"Wake Me Up When September Ends"	Green Day	
September 23	"Wake Me Up When September Ends"	Green Day	
September 30	"Doesn't Remind Me"	Audioslave	
October 7	"Doesn't Remind Me"	Audioslave	
October 14	"Doesn't Remind Me"	Audioslave	
October 21	"Doesn't Remind Me"	Audioslave	
October 28	"Doesn't Remind Me"	Audioslave	
November 4	"Doesn't Remind Me"	Audioslave	
November 11	"Doesn't Remind Me"	Audioslave	
November 18	"Doesn't Remind Me"	Audioslave	
November 25	"DOA"	Foo Fighters	
December 2	"DOA"	Foo Fighters	
December 9	"DOA"	Foo Fighters	
December 16	"Angels/Losing/Sleep"	Our Lady Peace	
December 23	"Angels/Losing/Sleep"	Our Lady Peace	
