= Dinosaur (Theory of a Deadman album) =

Studio album by Theory of a Deadman
- Released: March 17, 2023
- Studios: Atlantis, Stockholm, Sweden
- Genres: Hard rock; alternative rock
- Length: 34:15
- Labels: 604; Atlantic; Roadrunner
- Producer: Martin Terefe

Theory of a Deadman chronology
Say Nothing (2020)	Dinosaur (2023)	Part 1: Funeral Songs (2026)

Singles from Dinosaur
- 1. "Dinosaur" Released: October 20, 2022; 2. "Ambulance" Released: January 13, 2023; 3. "Two Of Us (Stuck)" Released: February 17, 2023

Dinosaur is the eighth studio album by Canadian rock band Theory of a Deadman, released on March 17, 2023, through 604 Records in Canada and Atlantic and Roadrunner Records in the United States. The band continued their collaboration with Swedish music producer Martin Terefe who worked with them on their previous albums Wake Up Call and Say Nothing.

The album returns to a more guitar-oriented hard rock and alternative rock sound.

== Track listing ==
All tracks co-written by Tyler Connolly with additional co-writers listed.

Dinosaur track listing
No.	Title	Writer(s)	Length
1.	"Dinosaur"	Dean Back; Dave Brenner; Joe Dandeneau; Krsy Fox	3:48
2.	"Medusa (Stone)"	Beck; Brenner; Dandenau; Jennifer Decilveo	3:40
3.	"Sick"	Beck; Brenner; Dandenau; Taylor Foley	3:22
4.	"Two of Us (Stuck)"	Fox; Ralph MacDonald; William Salter; Bill Withers	3:32
5.	"Ambulance"	Fox	3:28
6.	"Sideways"	Beck; Brenner; Dandenau; Fox	3:29
7.	"Get in Line"	Beck; Brenner; Dandenau; Fox	3:18
8.	"Head in the Clouds"	Beck; Brenner; Dandenau; Fox	3:30
9.	"Hearts Too Wild"	Beck; Brenner; Dandenau; Fox	3:35
10.	"Summer Song"	Beck; Brenner; Dandenau; Fox	2:33
Total length:			34:15

== Personnel ==
Theory of a Deadman

- Tyler Connolly – vocals, guitar, piano
- Dave Brenner – guitar, backing vocals
- Dean Back – bass, backing vocals
- Joey Dandeneau – drums, backing vocals

Production

- Neal Avron – mixing
- Tyler Connolly – engineering, producing, programming
- Clem Cherry – engineering, programming
- Dyre Gormsen – engineering
- Ted Jensen – mastering engineering
- Jorge Arango Kure – engineering
- Glen Scott – programming
- Scott Skrzynski – mixing
- Martin Terefe – producing
- Nikolaj Torp Larsen – engineering
- Oskar Winberg – engineering, programming

== Charts ==
Chart performance for Dinosaur
Chart (2023)	Peak position
Scottish Albums (Official Charts)	49
UK Album Downloads (Official Charts)	29
