= No Surprise =

No Surprise may refer to:

- "No Surprise" (Daughtry song), 2009
- "No Surprise" (Theory of a Deadman song), 2005
- "No Surprise", a 1998 song by Ratt from the album Reach for the Sky
- "No Surprises", a 1998 single by Radiohead

== See also ==
- "No Surprize", a song by Aerosmith
