= History of Violence (song) =

Single by Theory of a Deadman

from the album Say Nothing
- Released: September 25, 2019
- Recorded: 2019
- Studio: Kensaltown
- Genre: Pop rock
- Length: 3:54
- Label: 604; Atlantic; Roadrunner
- Songwriters: Tyler Connolly; Christine Connolly
- Producer: Martin Terefe

Theory of a Deadman singles chronology
"Wicked Game" (2018)	"History of Violence" (2019)	"World Keeps Spinning" (2020)

Music video
- "History of Violence" on YouTube

"History of Violence" is a song performed by Canadian rock band Theory of a Deadman, a single from their seventh studio album, Say Nothing (2020). It was produced by Martin Terefe and recorded at Kensaltown Recording Studios in London. The band's transition into the pop rock genre is still evident in "History of Violence", and has been associated with lead singer Tyler Connolly's piano-playing ability, which forced a change in songwriting style and was acquired prior to the recording of their sixth record, Wake Up Call (2017). "History of Violence" marked the group's fourth single to top the Billboard Mainstream Rock chart in the United States, and appeared on the Billboard Canada Rock, Rock Airplay, and Hot Rock Songs charts as well.

"History of Violence" was written by Connolly and ex-wife Christine Connolly, and was released alongside its music video on September 25, 2019, as the lead single from Say Nothing, serving as an instant download on pre-orders of the album. The song's lyrics address the topic of domestic violence with the band encouraging their fans to contact the National Domestic Violence Hotline should they or someone they know need assistance or guidance in dealing with domestic abuse.

== Recording and release ==
"History of Violence" was produced by Martin Terefe and recorded at Kensaltown Recording Studios in London in 2019. Say Nothing is the second album in which the band collaborated with the Swedish music producer with the first time being their previous studio album, Wake Up Call, released in 2017. The single was mixed by Neal Avron and Scott Skrzynski, while engineering was done by Clem Cherry and Jorge Arango Kure.

The single was released alongside its music video on September 25, 2019; the same day, Theory of a Deadman announced the name of their pending album. It was included as an instant download with pre-orders of Say Nothing.

== Composition and lyrics ==
The lyrics of the single—written by lead singer and primary songwriter Tyler Connolly along with ex-wife Christine Connolly—discuss the topic of domestic violence and was greatly inspired by the #MeToo movement. Tyler spoke of the song, "'History of Violence' tells the sad story of a girl trapped in a life of domestic abuse, leaving her with what she feels is the only way to escape. Even though she's in jail, it's still a better place to be than being imprisoned in real life by this man." The chorus, initially written about a different topic, was composed first. The subject of domestic abuse was later established as the remaining lyrics were penned, with the assistance of Christine; Tyler acknowledged and appreciated the perspective of a woman and being the member of an all-male band, felt compelled to release a song in an effort to help women.

The band has encouraged those who are, or know of someone who is, experiencing domestic violence to reach out to the National Domestic Violence Hotline. For their 2020 tour while promoting Say Nothing, the band supported domestic violence groups by partnering with Plus1, an organization that takes US$1 from each concert ticket sold and donating it to a charity of the band's choosing.

== Commercial performance ==
"History of Violence" peaked at number 15 on Billboard's Canada Rock chart on January 3, 2020. In the United States, the track spent a total of 23 weeks on the Billboard Mainstream Rock chart and peaked at number one, making it the band's fourth single to top this chart, after "Bad Girlfriend", "Lowlife", and "Rx (Medicate)". The song also made an appearance on the Rock Airplay and Hot Rock Songs charts, climbing to positions 13 and 15, respectively.

== Music video ==
The music video for "History of Violence" premiered on September 25, 2019, via Theory of a Deadman's official YouTube account. It was directed by Sam Sulam and produced by Eric Cook for Psycho Films, and was filmed in September 2019 in northern Los Angeles County, with some scenes being shot at Mira Loma Detention Center (a women's prison located in Lancaster, California). Its narrative focuses on the story of a woman enduring the abusive behavior of her husband; after shooting and killing him, she is sentenced to prison, which ultimately leads her to a feeling of freedom. Connolly stated, "We wanted to have a video that not only reflected the lyrics of the track but also left the viewer feeling like there's something they can do if they've been affected by something like this." The video does not include an appearance by any of the band members, with guitarist Dave Brenner describing it as a "mini movie" and Connolly emphasizing the need for viewers to focus on the woman and her story, rather than the band.

== Credits and personnel ==
Credits adapted from AllMusic.

Theory of a Deadman

- Tyler Connolly – vocals, guitar
- Dave Brenner – guitar, backing vocals
- Dean Back – bass, backing vocals
- Joey Dandeneau – drums, backing vocals

Production

- Martin Terefe – producing
- Tyler Connolly – producing, programming, recording
- Clem Cherry – engineering, programming
- Jorge Arango Kure – engineering
- Ted Jensen – mastering engineering
- Neal Avron – mixing
- Scott Skrzynski – mixing
- Glen Scott – programming
- Oskar Winberg – programming, recording
- Dyre Gormsen – recording
- Nikolaj Torp Larsen – recording

Location

- Recorded at Kensaltown Recording Studios in London, England

== Charts ==
=== Weekly charts ===
Chart (2019–2020)	Peak position
Canada Rock (Billboard)	15
US Rock & Alternative Airplay (Billboard)	13
US Hot Rock & Alternative Songs (Billboard)	15

=== Year-end charts ===
Chart (2020)	Position
US Rock Airplay (Billboard)	47
US Hot Rock & Alternative Songs (Billboard)	94
