= Protest Songs 1924–2012 =

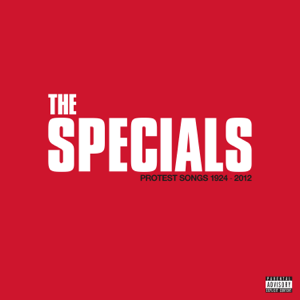

Studio album by the Specials
- Released: 1 October 2021
- Genre: Blues; folk; country; rock
- Length: 45:15
- Label: Island; Universal
- Producer: Terry Hall; Lynval Golding; Horace Panter; Torp Larsen

The Specials chronology
Encore (2019)	Protest Songs 1924–2012 (2021)

Professional ratings
Aggregate scores
Source	Rating
Metacritic	64/100
Review scores
Source	Rating
AllMusic	3/5 stars
The Guardian	4/5 stars
NME	4/5 stars

Protest Songs 1924–2012 is the ninth and final studio album by the English ska revival band the Specials. It is the second Specials album led by the trio of Lynval Golding, Terry Hall and Horace Panter. The album entered at number 2 on the UK Albums Chart after its first week of release and spent two weeks on the chart.

The album is the last to feature Hall as lead vocalist prior to his death in December 2022 at age 63.

== Track listing ==
1. "Freedom Highway" (Pops Staples) – 3:24
2. "Everybody Knows" (Leonard Cohen, Sharon Robinson) – 5:23
3. "I Don't Mind Failing in This World" (Malvina Reynolds) – 4:40
4. "Black, Brown and White" (Big Bill Broonzy) – 2:57
5. "Ain't Gonna Let Nobody Turn Us Around" (Traditional/Clarence Carter White) – 3:46
6. "Fuck All the Perfect People" (Chip Taylor) – 4:05
7. "My Next Door Neighbor" (Jerry McCain) – 2:33
8. "Trouble Every Day" (Frank Zappa) – 5:04
9. "Listening Wind" (Brian Eno, David Byrne) – 4:05
10. "I Live in a City" (Malvina Reynolds) – 2:20
11. "Soldiers Who Want to Be Heroes" (Rod McKuen) – 2:51
12. "Get Up, Stand Up" (Bob Marley, Peter Tosh) – 4:07

LP bonus 7" vinyl

1. "Vote for Me" (Live at Coventry Cathedral) (Hall, Panter, Golding, Larsen) – 4:01
2. "Blam Blam Fever" (Live at Coventry Cathedral) (Earl Grant, V. E. Grant) – 5:40

== Personnel ==
=== The Specials ===
- Lynval Golding – electric guitar, acoustic guitar, vocals
- Terry Hall – vocals
- Horace Panter – bass guitar, stand-up bass

=== Additional musicians ===
- Steve Cradock – electric guitar, acoustic guitar, vocals
- Hannah Hu – guest vocals
- Jim Hunt – saxophone
- Pablo Mendelssohn – flugelhorn
- Michael "Bami" Rose – repeater drum
- Kenrick Rowe – drums, percussion
- Tim Smart – trombone
- Nikolaj Torp Larsen – keyboards, harmonica, guitar, accordion, vocals
- Tony Uter – bass drum

=== Technical ===
- Horace Panter, Lynval Golding, Nikolaj Torp Larsen, Terry Hall – producer, arrangements
- George Murphy – engineer
- Liam Larkin – assistant engineer
- Cenzo Townshend – mixing
- Camden Clarke, Robert Sellens – mixing assistant
- Shane O'Neill – photography
- De Facto – graphic design

== Charts ==
Chart performance for Protest Songs 1924–2012
Chart (2021)	Peak position
German Albums (Offizielle Top 100)	47
Scottish Albums (OCC)	2
Swiss Albums (Schweizer Hitparade)	85
UK Albums (OCC)	2
