= Oskar Winberg =

Swedish songwriter and producer

Oskar Winberg, sometimes known as Oscar Winberg is a multi-platinum selling, Grammy and Latin Grammy award winning mixer, producer, songwriter, recording engineer, and multi-instrumentalist. He has worked with artists such as Shawn Mendes, Sting, YUNGBLUD, Ricardo Arjona, Christina Aguilera, Jesse & Joy, James Blunt, Theory Of A Deadman, Robbie Williams, Buika, Paloma Faith, Mike Posner, and many more. Originally from Stockholm, Sweden, and a mentee of the record producer Martin Terefe, after five years at the helm of the Kensaltown Studios, Oskar, he is now based out of his own Mountain River Studio.

== Discography ==
Selected production, mixing, recording credits

- 2008 Eric Bibb – Spirit I Am (engineer)
- 2009 Glen Scott – Trust The Dawn (Japan) (co-producer, songwriter, musician, engineer, mix engineer)
- 2010 Simon Elvnäs – Words Unspoken (musician, engineer)
- 2012 Jenny Bohman – One More Time (musician, engineer)
- 2012 Glen Scott – Trust The Dawn (US) (co-producer, songwriter, musician, engineer, mix engineer)
- 2013 Eric Bibb – Jericho Road (musician, engineer)
- 2014 Denise Pearson – Imprint (musician)
- 2014 Eric Bibb – Eric Bibb in 50 Songs (musician, engineer)
- 2014 Yana Bibb – Not A Minute Too Late (songwriter, musician, engineer, mix engineer)
- 2014 Jared Porter – East to West (songwriter)
- 2015 Mike Posner – The Truth (EP) (musician, engineer)
- 2015 Buika – Vivir Sin Miedo (musician, engineer)
- 2015 Shawn Mendes – "Believe" (from The Descendants OST) (musician, engineer)
- 2015 Lowell feat. Icona Pop – "Ride" (single) (musician, engineer)
- 2015 TIEKS – "Sunshine" (single) (engineer)
- 2015 Mike Posner – "I Took a Pill in Ibiza" (single) (musician)
- 2015 Jesse & Joy – Un Besito Más (musician, engineer)
- 2015 Zaz – Sur La Route (musician, engineer)
- 2016 Mike Posner – At Night, Alone. (musician, engineer)
- 2016 Josh Flowers & The Wild – Let the Dirt Live (engineer, mix engineer)
- 2016 Christina Aguilera – "Change" (engineer)
- 2016 Ward Thomas – Cartwheels (musician, engineer)
- 2016 Amaia Montero – "100 Metros" (single) (engineer)
- 2016 Abel Pintos – 11 (musician, engineer)
- 2016 Tijn Verkerk feat. Sharon D Clarke – "Take Me Away" (single) (engineer)
- 2016 Ward Thomas – "Fly Away" (single b-side) (producer, musician, engineer, mix engineer)
- 2016 Bobby Bazini – Summer Is Gone (songwriter, musician, engineer)
- 2016 D/C – "Blinded by the Lights" (single) (engineer)
- 2016 Fetsum – Light in a Dark Place (musician, engineer, mix engineer)
- 2016 Robbie Williams – The Heavy Entertainment Show (engineer)
- 2017 Bipolar Sunshine – The Scientist (musician, engineer, mix engineer)
- 2017 James Blunt – The Afterlove (engineer)
- 2017 Ximena Sariñana & Jesús Navarro – "Nada Personal" (single) (musician, engineer)
- 2017 Ward Thomas – A Shorter Story (producer, musician, engineer, mix engineer)
- 2017 Eric Bibb – Brotherly Love (special edition) (engineer)
- 2017 Ricardo Arjona – Circo Soledad (musician, engineer, mix engineer)
- 2017 Nikhil D'Souza – "Beautiful Mind" (single) (engineer)
- 2017 Theory of a Deadman – "RX (Medicate)" (single) (musician, engineer)
- 2017 Leroy Sanchez – Leave It To You (songwriter)
- 2017 Josh Flowers – "Car You Drive" (single) (musician, engineer, mix engineer)
- 2017 Anoushka Lucas – "Dark Soul" (single) (engineer)
- 2017 Theory of a Deadman – Wake Up Call (musician, engineer)
- 2017 Josh Flowers – "Favourite Record" (single) (musician, engineer, mix engineer)
- 2017 Paloma Faith – The Architect (engineer)
- 2017 Theory of a Deadman – "RX (Medicate) Symphonic Acoustic" (single) (engineer, mix engineer)
- 2017 A-ha – "Take On Me" (2017 Acoustic) (single) (musician, engineer, mix engineer)
- 2017 Alice Chater – Vision of Love (producer, musician, engineer)
- 2018 Amaia Montero – Nacidos Para Creer (musician, engineer)
- 2018 Yungblud – 21st Century Liability (musician, engineer)
- 2018 Kat Cunning – Make You Say (musician, engineer)
- 2018 Tom Odell – If You Wanna Love Somebody (engineer)
- 2018 Leonel García – 2:12 (musician, engineer, mix engineer)
- 2018 Josh Flowers – Lonely People Dancing (musician, engineer, mix engineer)
- 2018 Yungblud – Yungblud (Unplugged) (musician, engineer, mix engineer)
- 2018 Leonel García – Amor Presente (musician, engineer, mix engineer)
- 2019 Alexander Oscar – Highs & Lows (producer, songwriter, musician, engineer)
- 2019 Ward Thomas – Restless Minds (co-producer, musician, engineer)
- 2019 Robbie Williams – Under The Radar, vol. 3 (musician, engineer)
- 2019 Evan Barlow – Let Him Come (acoustic) (co-producer, musician, engineer, mix engineer)
- 2019 Ward Thomas – No Filter – Stripped (producer, musician, engineer, mix engineer)
- 2019 Kat Cunning – Birds (co-producer, musician, engineer)
- 2019 Arlissa – Running (engineer)
- 2019 Theory of a Deadman – "History Of Violence" (musician, engineer)
- 2019 Evan Barlow – Fire (co-writer, co-producer, musician, engineer, mix engineer)
- 2019 Kat Cunning – For The Love (co-producer, musician, engineer)
- 2019 Jamie Cullum – Taller (musician, mix engineer, engineer)
- 2019 Anoushka Lucas – Dark Soul (musician, mix engineer, engineer)
- 2020 Theory of a Deadman – Say Nothing (musician, engineer, arranger)
- 2020 Leonel García – Normal (mix engineer)
- 2020 Ward Thomas – The Space Between (producer, musician, mix, mastering, recording engineer)
- 2020 Jesse & Joy, Luis Fonsi – Tanto (engineer)
- 2020 Evan Barlow – Barlow Lane (songwriter, co-producer, musician, engineer)
- 2020 Jesse & Joy – Aire (musician, engineer)
- 2020 Ricardo Arjona – Blanco (musician, mix engineer, engineer)
- 2020 Leonel García – Por Ti (mix engineer)
- 2020 Martin Terefe – The Involuntary Gardener (engineer)
- 2020 Josh Flowers – Side A (musician, engineer)
- 2020 Ward Thomas – Invitation (producer, mix engineer, musician, engineer)
- 2020 Leonel García – Quedate (mix engineer)
- 2021 Cian Ducrot – Not Usually Like This (mastering engineer)
- 2021 Nicole Zignano & Leonel García – Miento (mix engineer)
- 2021 Cian Ducrot – Crocodiles (mastering engineer)
