= Say Nothing (album) =

Studio album by Theory of a Deadman
- Released: January 31, 2020
- Recorded: April–May 2019
- Studio: Kensaltown, The Panic Room, Eastcote Studio 4
- Length: 35:01
- Label: 604; Atlantic; Roadrunner
- Producer: Martin Terefe

Theory of a Deadman chronology
Wake Up Call (2017)	Say Nothing (2020)	Dinosaur (2023)

Singles from Say Nothing
- 1. "History of Violence" Released: September 25, 2019; 2. "World Keeps Spinning" Released: January 24, 2020; 3. "Strangers" Released: November 1, 2020

Say Nothing is the seventh studio album by Canadian rock band Theory of a Deadman, released on January 31, 2020, through 604 Records in Canada and Atlantic and Roadrunner Records in the United States. The record contains lyrics about such issues as domestic violence and racism. The band opted to continue their collaboration with Swedish music producer Martin Terefe—who worked with them on their previous album Wake Up Call—returning to London in April 2019. Their prior album marked the group's departure from their usual hard rock sound to a more pop- and pop rock-infused style and was met with mixed reviews from critics.

== Background and development ==
Theory of a Deadman's sound had been firmly rooted in the alternative and hard rock genres since the band signed a record deal with Chad Kroeger's 604 Records in 2001. Lead singer Tyler Connolly stated that after the release of their fourth studio album, The Truth Is..., in 2011, the band was receiving pressure from their record label to create an album that was "more poppy". He believed the label was "getting tired of [their] fun rock stuff" and "wanted to hear something different". The band responded to this pressure with the release of their fifth studio album, Savages, in 2014, which Connolly described as the "opposite" of their record label's wishes. Los Angeles-based music producer Howard Benson worked with the band on Savages as well as three of their previous albums, but the group felt they wanted something different for their future records. Connolly stated that their A&R team mentioned Swedish music producer, Martin Terefe, who was known for working with pop rock music artists such as Jason Mraz, James Blunt, and Train, and was interested in collaborating with the group. Theory of a Deadman spent seven weeks in London in 2016, recording at Terefe's Kensaltown Studios.

The band's sixth studio album Wake Up Call, released in October 2017, has been described by critics as a departure from Theory of a Deadman's usual hard rock foundation, moving into pop and pop rock territory. The band credited this shift to Connolly, the group's primary songwriter, acquiring and learning how to play the piano prior to the album's recording. Connolly expressed feeling creatively exhausted, stating, "For some reason, [on] this album, I felt tapped on the guitar side. I felt like every riff was written." Bassist Dean Back agreed, saying, "During the writing process, Tyler’s go-to was to always pick up a guitar and write with that. He pushed himself through and instead of writing with the guitar he used a piano he has in his house. ... I think writing on the piano opened up another creative realm in him." The album was met with mixed reviews from critics with some praising the lyrical maturity that was lacking in previous albums, and others criticizing it for the sudden change in genre.

== Music and lyrics ==
Say Nothing has been described by the band as a "continuation of the last record", and Connolly acknowledged a sense of anxiety while recording the album due to the pressure created by the success of Wake Up Call's lead single, "Rx (Medicate)" (a song that addresses prescription drug abuse). Although Theory of a Deadman have avoided having their lyrics surround social and political issues, the positive feedback they received for "Rx (Medicate)" influenced their decision to speak about important topics related to domestic violence, racism, depression and anxiety, and politics. Connolly said, "This album allowed me to say all of the things that were on my mind earlier, but I was too afraid to say. Our previous material was pretty much all relationship-driven. Everything was about me being unhappy. This one was about what's going on in the world, the state of American politics, and everything else. It was a completely different way of writing for us." Guitarist Dave Brenner added, "I look at the record as a microcosm of our current era. It's a reminder to look inward at what's happening and what we're becoming. ... Maybe we can give the world a little solace and encourage everyone to treat each other better."

The album adds elements of brass instruments, gospel choirs, and piano to its sound. Connolly commented on the musical composition: "We're trying to do something we haven't done before on this album and continue to be inspired, and we found that in new instrumentation and different production." The band found further inspiration after participating in a private tour of Abbey Road Studios in London, specifically referencing The Beatles' album Sgt. Pepper's Lonely Hearts Club Band, which contained tracks recorded there in 1967.

Say Nothing's lead single, "History of Violence", talks about domestic abuse, and was released concurrently with its music video on September 25, 2019. In an interview with Alternative Press, Connolly stated, "I think with the #MeToo movement, there's been a lot of empowerment of women, which has been fantastic. We wanted to have a video that not only reflected the lyrics of the track but also left the viewer feeling like there's something they can do if they've been affected by something like this. That's a big issue—a lot of women don't come forward. I think it's important for people to feel like there's other people out there that can help."

"Strangers" is a song that examines the polarizing effect of politics on society and how political and social events created a new generation of activists; Connolly stressed his beliefs in not making the politically charged song seem biased. The record's title track—"Say Nothing"—vocalizes the lack of communication seen in relationships, which is one issue that Connolly admits led to his divorce from ex-wife Christine.

Exploring the topic of depression and anxiety, "World Keeps Spinning", Connolly's goal with this song's lyrics was to reflect on his personal experiences of depression, and to provide consolation to those experiencing despair. He found the writing process more complicated when touching on sensitive and personal subjects.

== Recording ==
Production took place at Kensaltown Recording Studios, an establishment owned and run by the producer of Say Nothing, Martin Terefe. The band recorded the 10 tracks for the record from April to May 2019 in London, spending six weeks in an Airbnb. Additional recording was completed by Connolly at The Panic Room in Burbank, California and by Nikolaj Torp Larsen at Eastcote Studio 4 in London.

== Promotion and singles ==
In an effort to promote the album, three songs were released to the public before the official release of Say Nothing—"History of Violence" on September 25, 2019, "Strangers" on November 8, and the title track on December 13. "World Keeps Spinning" was released on January 31, 2020, in concurrence with the album; the music video premiered on the band's official YouTube channel. Pre-orders for Say Nothing were made available on September 25, with "History of Violence" included as an instant grat download; "Strangers" was also included starting on November 8.

The band headlined a Canadian tour, beginning on January 31, 2020, to coincide with the release of the album. An American tour with 10 Years was to officially commence on April 9; with respects to the suspensions of large-scale gatherings due to the COVID-19 pandemic, the tour was postponed to an unannounced date. The group was scheduled to tour in the United States with Breaking Benjamin, Bush, Saint Asonia, and Canadian musician Cory Marks, beginning on July 15 in Bristow, VA, and culminating on September 8 in Mountain View, CA; in May 2020, this tour was also canceled on account of the pandemic.

== Critical reception ==
Professional ratings
Aggregate scores
Source	Rating
Metacritic	54/100
Review scores
Source	Rating
AllMusic	2.5/5 stars
American Songwriter	3/5 stars
Classic Rock Magazine	Positive
Kerrang!	2/5 stars

The album received mostly mixed reviews according to four critics on Metacritic.

== Track listing ==
Say Nothing track listing
No.	Title	Writer(s)	Length
1.	"Black Hole in Your Heart"	Tyler Connolly, Dave Brenner, Dean Back, Joey Dandeneau, Christine Connolly	3:34
2.	"History of Violence"	T. Connolly, Brenner, Back, Dandeneau, C. Connolly	3:55
3.	"Affluenza"	T. Connolly, Brenner, Back, Dandeneau, C. Connolly	3:37
4.	"Say Nothing"	T. Connolly, Brenner, Back, Dandeneau, C. Connolly	3:36
5.	"Strangers"	T. Connolly, Brenner, Back, Dandeneau, C. Connolly	3:26
6.	"Ted Bundy"	T. Connolly, Brenner, Back, Dandeneau	3:32
7.	"World Keeps Spinning"	T. Connolly, Brenner, Back, Dandeneau	3:35
8.	"Quicksand"	T. Connolly, Brenner, Back, Dandeneau, C. Connolly	3:01
9.	"White Boy"	T. Connolly, Brenner, Back, Dandeneau	4:11
10.	"It's All Good"	T. Connolly, Brenner, Back, Dandeneau	2:34
Total length:			35:01

== Personnel ==
Credits adapted from the liner notes of Say Nothing.

Theory of a Deadman

- Tyler Connolly – vocals, guitar, piano
- Dave Brenner – guitar,
- Dean Back – bass
- Joey Dandeneau – drums

"Black Hole in Your Heart", "Quicksand", and "Say Nothing"

- David Davidson – violin, strings arrangement
- David Angell – violin
- Monisa Angell – viola
- Carole Rabinowitz – cello
- Taylor Pollert – string recording

Production

- Martin Terefe – production
- Neal Avron – mixing
- Tyler Connolly – additional production, additional recording, programming
- Dyre Gormsen – recording
- Oskar Winberg – recording, programming
- Clem Cherry – assistant engineer, programming
- Jorge Arango Kure – assistant engineer
- Ted Jensen – mastering
- Glen Scott – programming
- Nikolaj Torp Larsen – additional recording
- Scott Skrzynski – mix assistant

"Ted Bundy"

- David Davidson – violin, strings arrangement
- Oskar Winberg – horns arrangement, strings arrangement
- Sven Lindvall – horns arrangement, tuba
- David Angell – violin
- Monisa Angell – viola
- Carole Rabinowitz – cello
- Leif Lindvall – trumpet

Locations

- Recorded at Kensaltown Recording Studios (London), The Panic Room (Burbank, California), and Eastcote Studio 4 (London)
- Mixed at The Casita (Hollywood, California)
- Mastered at Sterling Sound (Nashville, Tennessee)
- Strings recorded at The Library (Nashville, Tennessee)

== Charts ==
Sales chart performance for Say Nothing
Chart (2020)	Peak position
Australian Digital Albums (ARIA)	35
Canadian Albums (Billboard)	51
US Billboard 200	116
US Top Alternative Albums (Billboard)	5
US Top Rock Albums (Billboard)	14

== See also ==
- List of 2020 albums
