= Straight Jacket =

Single by Theory of a Deadman

from the album Wake Up Call
- Released: January 16, 2018
- Recorded: 2016
- Studio: Kensaltown (London)
- Genre: Pop rock
- Length: 4:00
- Label: 604; Roadrunner; Atlantic
- Songwriter(s): Tyler Connolly; Dave Brenner; Dean Back; Joey Dandeneau
- Producer(s): Martin Terefe

Theory of a Deadman singles chronology
"Rx (Medicate)" (2017)	"Straight Jacket" (2018)	"Wicked Game" (2018)

Music video
- "Straight Jacket" on YouTube

"Straight Jacket" is a song by Canadian rock band Theory of a Deadman from their sixth studio album, Wake Up Call (2017). It is the second single from the record, following "Rx (Medicate)". Produced by Martin Terefe, it was recorded at Terefe's Kensaltown Studios in London and was released on January 16, 2018. Its music video, which was inspired by the American film One Flew Over the Cuckoo's Nest, was unveiled three weeks later on the band's official YouTube page.

The single has been met with mixed reviews with certain lyrics and musical aspects being perceived as negative by its critics. The track is the band's 22nd song to enter the Billboard's Mainstream Rock, peaking at number 12 in May 2018.

== Recording and composition ==
"Straight Jacket" was co-written by all four members of Theory of a Deadman, who enlisted the assistance of Swedish producer, Martin Terefe, to work on Wake Up Call. Recorded at Terefe's Kensaltown Studios in London, the song was released on January 16, 2018, and was promoted with a contest on Theory of a Deadman's official website in which participants would have a chance to win a straitjacket autographed by the band and a merchandise bundle.

"Straight Jacket"
A 24-second sample of the introduction and beginning lyrics of "Straight Jacket" featuring a distinct staccato piano riff, performed by lead singer Tyler Connolly.

Lead singer Tyler Connolly revealed that the single was formed in the days leading up to the album's recording. He stated that the beginning lyrics of the intro, "I wear a 36 long / White is my color", were developed first and that it took some time to complete the writing process due to the amount of lyrics. The track was composed with the assistance of a piano, characterized by the staccato notes in the beginning of the single. The piano is an instrument that Connolly had been teaching himself to play, with Wake Up Call being the first album in which most of the songwriting had been done with this instrument instead of a guitar. Connolly noted that the piano "opened [a] whole new world of creativity" for him, allowing for songs like "Straight Jacket" to formulate.

== Commercial performance and critical reception ==
"Straight Jacket" debuted at number 37 on Billboard's Mainstream Rock chart and peaked at number 12 in May 2018. In a review of Wake Up Call, James Christopher Monger of AllMusic called "Straight Jacket" a "lurid opener" to the album that "catered to the band's worst tendencies". Alternative Addiction called the song "listenable" while Allen J. Miller at Cryptic Rock disagreed, calling it "unlistenable". Jonni D at Über Röck also criticized the single, viewing the staccato piano notes as "infuriating" and castigating Connolly's "new-found penchant for rapping".

== Music video ==
The music video for "Straight Jacket" was released on February 7, 2018, via Theory of a Deadman's official YouTube account. Directed by Iqbal Ahmed, it was inspired by the 1975 American film, One Flew Over the Cuckoo's Nest, focusing on the band in an insane asylum and their escape from the institution. Connolly expressed how he was exhausted of the idea of performance-based music videos, opting for video concepts that entailed a story line for both "Straight Jacket" and the band's previous single, "Rx (Medicate)".

== Credits and personnel ==
Credits adapted from the liner notes of Wake Up Call.

Theory of a Deadman

- Tyler Connolly – writer, vocals, piano
- Dave Brenner – writer, guitar, backing vocals
- Dean Back – writer, bass, backing vocals
- Joey Dandeneau – writer, drums, backing vocals

Production

- Martin Terefe – producer

Location

- Recorded at Kensaltown Studios in London, England

== Charts ==
Chart (2018)	Peak position
Canada Rock (Billboard)	33
US Mainstream Rock (Billboard)	12
