= Hate My Life =

Single by Theory of a Deadman

from the album Scars & Souvenirs
- B-side: "Your Dream"
- Released: October 30, 2008 (Canada); November 10, 2008 (U.S.)
- Recorded: September 2007–January 2008
- Genre: Post-grunge; alternative rock
- Length: 3:10
- Label: Roadrunner; 604
- Composers: Tyler Connolly; Dave Brenner; Dean Back
- Lyricists: Tyler Connolly; Christine Danielle Connolly
- Producer: Howard Benson

Theory of a Deadman singles chronology
| "All or Nothing" (2008) | "Hate My Life" (2008) | "Not Meant to Be" (2008) |

"Hate My Life" is a song by the Canadian rock band Theory of a Deadman. It was released in October 2008 as the fourth overall single (third American single and fifth Canadian single) from their third studio album Scars & Souvenirs. The track was selected as BBC Radio One's Track of the Week for the week ending March 20, 2009.

== Music video ==
According to Theory's site, the video was shot on November 15, 2008. It was asked on the site, as a contest, for forty fans to star in the music video. It was filmed at the Warner Brothers Studio in Burbank, California. It was released January 9, 2009, on Yahoo! Music. It was directed by Bill Fishman.

At the beginning of the video, Tyler sees a hobo, and then he starts singing the song, the lyrics matching everything that is happening in the video. He complains about how he hates hobos ("So sick of the hobos always begging for change, I don't like how I gotta work and they just sit around and get paid"), he almost gets hit by a car ("I hate all of the people, who can't drive their cars...), we meet his wife, played by his real wife Christine Danielle Connolly ("I hate how my wife; is always up my ass...), a girl drops her bag of lingerie (Tyler looking at it interestingly), a construction worker's boss telling him off ("I still hate my job, my boss is a dick...), and when he sings the chorus, a sign comes down from a building reading "I Hate My Life." Then, Tyler jumps onto a parade float with the rest of the band, performing the rest of the song. Behind them travels a huge group of people, which include the hobo, the construction workers, and the others Tyler ran into.

== Reception ==
"Hate My Life" received a negative review from The Guardian, which criticized it for "reinforcing sexist stereotypes" and "being a slimy letch", concluding that "being a sexist, misanthropic potential paedo isn't a great way to attract the chicks." Milwaukee-based newspaper The Shepherd Express described the song as a "blend of reactionary country-music politics and hard-rock misogyny".

== Charts ==
=== Weekly charts ===
| Chart (2009) | Peak position |
|---|---|
| Canada (Canadian Hot 100) | 65 |
| Canada Rock (Billboard) | 8 |
| UK Singles (OCC) | 92 |
| UK Rock & Metal (OCC) | 2 |
| US Bubbling Under Hot 100 (Billboard) | 7 |
| US Hot Rock & Alternative Songs (Billboard) | 26 |

=== Year-end charts ===
| Chart (2009) | Position |
|---|---|
| US Hot Rock Songs (Billboard) | 36 |

== Certifications ==
| Region | Certification | Certified units/sales |
|---|---|---|
| Canada (Music Canada) | Platinum | 80,000^{‡} |
| United States (RIAA) | Platinum | 1,000,000^{‡} |
^{‡} Sales+streaming figures based on certification alone.
