= So Happy (Theory of a Deadman song) =

2008 single by Theory of a Deadman

Single by Theory of a Deadman

from the album Scars & Souvenirs
- Released: February 11, 2008
- Recorded: September 2007
- Length: 4:14
- Label: Roadrunner; 604
- Songwriters: Tyler Connolly; Dave Brenner; Dean Back
- Producer: Howard Benson

Theory of a Deadman singles chronology
"Since You've Been Gone" (2006)	"So Happy" (2008)	"Bad Girlfriend" (2008)

"So Happy" is a single by Theory of a Deadman, and the first to be released from their third album Scars & Souvenirs. It was officially released to radio on February 11, 2008, although many rock stations in the United States added it to their rotations earlier. "So Happy" debuted on Billboard's Mainstream Rock Tracks chart on February 9, 2008, and peaked at #2 on April 5, 2008. The song needed only three weeks to become a top-10 hit on the Mainstream Rock chart, making it their fastest top-10 entry to date. It is also the band's first top-20 hit on the Modern Rock Tracks chart. In Canada, it debuted (and peaked) at #58 on the Canadian Hot 100 on March 8, 2008.

The song features Shinedown vocalist Brent Smith performing backing vocals.

== Music video ==
The music video first aired on MuchMusic in the middle of April 2008. It peaked on the MuchMusic Countdown at #10.

The video features alternating cuts of the band performing on a mansion porch and Serinda Swan as a disgruntled girlfriend who murders her boyfriend, subsequently steals his property, forges his will, and eventually cleans the murder scene before leaving with a mischievous smile on her face. The video was directed by Colin Minihan.

== Chart positions ==
Chart (2008)	Peak position
Canada (Canadian Hot 100)	58
Canada Rock (Billboard)	4
US Alternative Airplay (Billboard)	17
US Mainstream Rock (Billboard)	2
