= Gasoline (Theory of a Deadman album) =

Album released by Theory of a Deadman

Studio album by Theory of a Deadman
- Released: March 29, 2005
- Recorded: October 2004–January 2005
- Genres: Hard rock, post-grunge, alternative metal, alternative rock
- Length: 44:41
- Labels: 604, Roadrunner
- Producer: Howard Benson

Theory of a Deadman chronology
Theory of a Deadman (2002)	Gasoline (2005)	Scars & Souvenirs (2008)

Singles from Gasoline
- 1. "No Surprise" Released: February 15, 2005 (U.S., CAN) September 27, 2005 (AUS); 2. "Say Goodbye" Released: April 6, 2005 (U.S.); 3. "Santa Monica" Released: June 14, 2005 (CAN) August 18, 2006 (U.S.); 4. "Hello Lonely (Walk Away from This)" Released: October 18, 2005; 5. "Better Off" Released: December 6, 2005 (CAN); 6. "Since You've Been Gone" Released: June 13, 2006 (CAN)(US Video)

Professional ratings
Review scores
Source	Rating
Allmusic	2.5/5 stars

Gasoline is the second studio album released by Theory of a Deadman on March 29, 2005. The album features four songs used in the video game Fahrenheit (also known as Indigo Prophecy): "Santa Monica", "No Surprise", "Say Goodbye" and "No Way Out". The album was first released in Canada by 604 Records, and was later released in the U.S. by Roadrunner Records. The original 604 Records release of the album is fully unedited, however the Roadrunner version released in the U.S. contains edited versions of "No Surprise" and "Me & My Girl". The album was released to mixed reviews from critics.

== Track listing ==
All lyrics are written by Tyler Connolly; all music is composed by Theory of a Deadman.

No.	Title	Length
1.	"Hating Hollywood"	3:25
2.	"No Way Out"	3:29
3.	"No Surprise"	3:40
4.	"Quiver"	2:51
5.	"Santa Monica"	4:06
6.	"Better Off"	2:51
7.	"Say Goodbye"	3:04
8.	"Hello Lonely (Walk Away from This)"	4:21
9.	"Me & My Girl"	3:40
10.	"Since You've Been Gone"	4:18
11.	"Hell Just Ain't the Same"	1:05
12.	"Save the Best for Last"	4:15
13.	"In the Middle"	3:36
Total length:		44:41

== Special edition bonus tracks ==
No.	Title	Length
1.	"Lynchburg Lemonade (Southern Days)"	3:32
2.	"Got Me Wrong" (Alice in Chains Cover)	4:30
3.	"What's Your Name" (Lynyrd Skynyrd Cover)	3:31

== Personnel ==
Band

- Tyler Connolly - lead vocals, lead guitar
- Dave Brenner - rhythm guitar, backing vocals
- Dean Back - bass, backing vocals
- Brent Fitz - drums, backing vocals

Additional musicians

- Daniel Adair - drums on "Santa Monica"
- Howard Benson – keyboards, programming

Production

- Howard Benson - production
- Mike Plotnikoff - recording
- Hatsikazu "Hatch" Inagaki - engineer
- Chris Lord-Alge - mixing
- Ted Jensen - mastering at Sterling Sound in NYC, NY

== Chart positions ==
Chart positions
^{Billboard}	^{CAN}
58	10

=== Singles ===
Single	Peak chart positions		
Single	CAN	US Main	US Alt
No Surprise	—	8	24
Say Goodbye	—	22	—
Santa Monica	—	27	—
Hello Lonely (Walk Away From This)	—	30	—
Better Off	—	—	—
Since You've Been Gone	57	—	—
