= Wake Up Call (Theory of a Deadman album) =

Studio album by Theory of a Deadman
- Released: October 27, 2017
- Recorded: 2016
- Studio: Kensaltown
- Genre: Pop; pop rock
- Length: 41:07
- Label: 604; Roadrunner; Atlantic
- Producer: Martin Terefe

Theory of a Deadman chronology
Angel Acoustic EP (2015)	Wake Up Call (2017)	Say Nothing (2020)

Singles from Wake Up Call
- 1. "Rx (Medicate)" Released: July 27, 2017; 2. "Straight Jacket" Released: January 16, 2018; 3. "Wicked Game" Released: July 10, 2018

Wake Up Call is the sixth studio album by the Canadian rock band Theory of a Deadman, released on October 27, 2017, through 604 Records in Canada and Atlantic and Roadrunner Records in the United States. Critics have described the album as having a more pop-infused sound than previous releases, which was the result of lead singer Tyler Connolly composing the majority of the record's music on the piano instead of the usual guitar. Departing from the same recording and production team they had worked with for the past four albums, the band opted to collaborate with Swedish music producer, Martin Terefe, and spent seven weeks at Kensaltown Studios in London.

The album was met with mixed reviews from critics. Some praised the lyrical maturity that was lacking in previous albums; others criticized it for the sudden change in genre. Wake Up Call peaked at numbers thirteen and twenty-four on the Billboard Canadian Albums and US Billboard 200 charts, respectively. Its lead single, "Rx (Medicate)"—a song addressing the opioid epidemic in North America—was released on July 27, 2017, and is the band's third single to top the US Billboard Mainstream Rock chart.

== Background and development ==
Theory of a Deadman's sound had been firmly rooted in the alternative and hard rock genres since the band signed a record deal with Chad Kroeger's 604 Records in 2001. Lead singer Tyler Connolly stated that after the release of their fourth studio album, The Truth Is..., in 2011, the band was receiving pressure from their record label to create an album that was "more poppy". He believed the label was "getting tired of [their] fun rock stuff" and "wanted to hear something different". The band responded to this pressure with the release of their fifth studio album, Savages, in 2014, which Connolly described as the "opposite" of their record label's wishes. Los Angeles-based music producer Howard Benson worked with the band on Savages as well as three of their previous albums. The record marked the band's second album to peak within the top ten of the Billboard 200 chart.

While on tour in 2015 in support of Savages, Theory of a Deadman released a five-track EP called Angel Acoustic EP. The release (also produced by Benson) consisted of acoustic versions of some of their most popular songs and included an acoustic cover of Swedish singer Tove Lo's "Habits (Stay High)". 2016 marked 15 years since the band's formation and was celebrated with an unplugged tour throughout western Canada.

== Musical style and composition ==
Wake Up Call has been described by critics as a departure from Theory of a Deadman's usual hard rock foundation, moving into pop and pop rock territory. The band has credited this shift to Connolly, the group's primary songwriter, acquiring and learning how to play the piano prior to the album's recording. Connolly expressed feeling creatively exhausted, stating, "For some reason, [on] this album, I felt tapped on the guitar side. I felt like every riff was written." With a friend's encouragement, Connolly purchased a piano and told Billboard:

... [I] just started playing and writing songs like I'd never written songs before. And the songs were so different and the lyrics were so different. It came from a place of complete freedom. It didn't come from a place of, 'Where's music at right now? What's rock doing?' It was just me sitting at a piano and playing chords and notes and then all of a sudden I come up with one song idea after another.

Bassist Dean Back agreed, saying, "During the writing process, Tyler’s go-to was to always pick up a guitar and write with that. He pushed himself through and instead of writing with the guitar he used a piano he has in his house. ... I think writing on the piano opened up another creative realm in him."

== Recording ==
Theory of a Deadman worked with the same recording and production team in Los Angeles for their previous four albums and felt they wanted something different for Wake Up Call. Connolly stated that their A&R team mentioned Swedish music producer, Martin Terefe, who was known for working with pop rock music artists such as Jason Mraz, James Blunt, and Train, and was interested in collaborating with the group. Instead of working in Los Angeles, the band spent seven weeks in London in 2016, recording at Terefe's Kensaltown Studios.

Back commented on the relaxed and "organic" atmosphere of Kensaltown and described the studio as an open room with the group recording their music while sitting on couches as opposed to being isolated in separate areas. Terefe used minimal dubbing and preferred to abandon the pre-production of tracks—something the band would normally spend two to three weeks on—in order to leave room for creative freedom. Connolly and Back both described the recording process as a "great" and "cool" experience.

== Promotion and singles ==
Wake Up Call marked the first album in which the band went by their abbreviated name, Theory. Its first single, "Rx (Medicate)", was released on July 27, 2017, the same day that Theory of a Deadman announced the name of its respective album. The song addresses the opioid epidemic that has affected the United States, with Connolly telling Billboard that he "really wanted to discuss how messed up America is" regarding prescription drugs. He also conveyed his feelings that this was the band's "most important song" as far as how it has affected their fans.

"Rx (Medicate)" proved to be successful, with Back claiming it as "the biggest song of [the band's] career right now". The track reached number one on the Billboard Mainstream Rock chart in October 2017 and earned a "No. 1 Song Award" from the Society of Composers, Authors and Music Publishers of Canada (SOCAN). It was certified platinum in June 2018 by Music Canada and nominated for "Rock Song of the Year" at the 2018 iHeartRadio Music Awards.

Pre-orders of the album were made available on July 28, 2017, which included "Rx (Medicate)" as an instant grat download. The band released a music video for "Echoes" in September 2017; the song was also made available with pre-orders. The album's second single, "Straight Jacket", was released in January 2018, and was accompanied by a music video on their official YouTube account in February 2018. Featuring staccato piano notes performed by Connolly, the song reached number 12 on Billboard's Mainstream Rock chart in May 2018.

The band launched a 33-city tour in the United States during the fall of 2017. The tour was extended into 2018 to include shows throughout western Canada and Europe. "There’s a real dichotomy of Theory now, two very different sides," Connolly said. "Not that we want to get away from our old songs, but the new songs are so diverse, such a juxtaposition. We're really working on building a big show, and trying to make it all more visual, as well." The band toured in Australia for the first time in their career in June 2018, and released a video the following month for "PCH" (which stands for "Pacific Coast Highway", the name designated to a particular section of the California State Route 1 in southern California) at the start of their summer tour in the United States. A music video for the title track was also released in October 2018.

== Critical reception and awards ==
Professional ratings
Review scores
Source	Rating
AllMusic	3/5 stars
Alternative Addiction	3.5/5 stars
Classic Rock Magazine	3/5 stars
Renowned for Sound	2/5 stars

Wake Up Call received mixed reviews from critics. James Christopher Monger of AllMusic gave the album three out of five stars, complimenting the maturation of the band's songwriting since their debut album and observing the favoring of "genuine emotion" throughout their songs over "callow frat boy misogyny". Alternative Addiction praised the band for adopting an "adapt, survive, and evolve" strategy concerning their move into pop music. Malcolm Dome from Classic Rock concluded that the album felt "too lightweight", saying, "The songwriting suggests there is a quality album in them that’s waiting to take flight, but the end game never lives up to the clear potential the music carries".

Über Rock criticized the album, stating, "With barely any trace of their established sound, Wake Up Call comes across as a desperate attempt to wear the clothes of pop music. Unfortunately for Theory of a Deadman, they fit terribly." Haydon Benfield from Renowned for Sound was also critical of record, stating, "With Wake Up Call offering little to captivate the listener, it is difficult to image [sic] what appeal Theory of a Deadman use to draw their fans in." The record was nominated for "Rock Album of the Year" at the 2018 Juno Awards, but lost to The Glorious Sons' Young Beauties and Fools.

== Track listing ==
No.	Title	Writer(s)	Length
1.	"Straight Jacket"	Theory of a Deadman	4:00
2.	"Rx (medicate)"	Theory of a Deadman	3:53
3.	"Echoes"	Theory of a Deadman	3:58
4.	"Wake Up Call"	Tyler Connolly, Christine Connolly, Peter M. Amato	3:55
5.	"PCH"	Theory of a Deadman	3:35
6.	"G.O.A.T"	Theory of a Deadman	4:08
7.	"Loner"	T. Connolly, C. Connolly	3:36
8.	"Time Machine"	T. Connolly, C. Connolly, Louis Biancaniello	2:56
9.	"Glass Jaw"	Theory of a Deadman	3:52
10.	"Po Mouth"	Theory of a Deadman	3:34
11.	"Wicked Game" (Chris Isaak cover)	Chris Isaak	3:40
Total length:			41:07

== Personnel ==
Credits adapted from the liner notes of Wake Up Call.

Theory of a Deadman

- Tyler Connolly – vocals, guitar
- Dave Brenner – guitar
- Dean Back –bass
- Joey Dandeneau – drums

Additional musicians

- Martin Terefe – guitar, piano, keyboard, Mellotron, backing vocals on "Po Mouth"
- Nikolaj Torp Larsen – Hammond organ, piano, synthesizer
- Oskar Winberg – guitar, keyboards, synthesizer, ukulele, backing vocals on "Po Mouth"

Production

- Martin Terefe – production
- Tyler Connolly – additional production, additional recording
- Dyre Gormsen – recording
- Oskar Winberg – recording, programming
- Nikolaj Torp Larsen – additional recording
- Clem Cherry – additional recording
- George Murphy – additional recording
- Flo Reutter – programming
- Neal Avron – mixing
- Scott Skrzynski – mixing
- Ted Jensen – mastering

"Loner", "G.O.A.T.", and "Wicked Game"

- David Davidson – violin, strings arrangement
- David Angell – violin
- Kris Wilkinson – viola
- Carole Rabinowitz – cello
- Bobby Shin – engineering

== Charts ==
Chart (2017)	Peak position
Canadian Albums Chart (Billboard)	13
US Billboard 200	24
US Alternative Albums (Billboard)	4
US Top Rock Albums (Billboard)	5

== Certifications ==
Region	Certification	Certified units/sales
Canada (Music Canada)	Gold	40,000^{‡}
United States (RIAA)	Gold	500,000^{‡}
^{‡} Sales+streaming figures based on certification alone.
