= Santa Monica (Theory of a Deadman song) =

Single by Theory of a Deadman

from the album Gasoline
- Released: June 14, 2005 (Canada); August 18, 2006 (U.S.)
- Recorded: October 2004–January 2005
- Genre: Alternative rock, post-grunge
- Length: 4:06
- Label: Roadrunner; 604
- Composers: Tyler Connolly; Dave Brenner; Dean Back
- Lyricist: Tyler Connolly
- Producer: Howard Benson

Theory of a Deadman singles chronology
"Say Goodbye" (2005)	"Santa Monica" (2005)	"Hello Lonely" (2005)

"Santa Monica" is the third single from the Canadian rock band Theory of a Deadman's second studio album Gasoline. It was released as the second single in Canada in June 2005, and as the fourth single in the United States on August 18, 2006. The song was heavily featured in the video game Fahrenheit (also known as Indigo Prophecy).

== Song meaning ==
The song is written from the point of view of a man who gets home from work and reads a note from his girlfriend telling him that she has left him and went to Santa Monica Boulevard, Los Angeles, California, to try and lead a better life. In the song, the man is looking back on the event and seems to be referring to it in the past tense: "I remember the day when you left for Santa Monica." The video plays with the ambiguity between Santa Monica Boulevard and the city of Santa Monica, but it's pretty clear it's the street in Los Angeles that is intended.

The song has no relation to the 1995 Everclear song of the same name, however Tyler Connolly has stated during their live shows that it is one of the band's favorite songs.

== Music video ==
In the music video, a girl is writing a note to give to her boyfriend before she leaves. When he gets home, she's gone and he's left with the note. He sometimes gets letters and post cards from her about her trip to Santa Monica, while he's home wishing she was with him. While in Santa Monica the girl has a tough time. She is eventually driven to stripping and prostitution. She finally gives up and the last shot in the video is her walking back into her ex-boyfriend's house after finally calling him and saying how miserable her life had become.

== Track listing ==
=== Canadian single ===
1. "Santa Monica"
2. "Santa Monica" (acoustic version)
3. "Got Me Wrong" (Alice in Chains cover)

=== U.S. single ===
1. "Santa Monica"

== Associates ==
- The drums in the song "Santa Monica" were played by Nickelback's Daniel Adair.
- String Arrangements in "Santa Monica" were by Suzie Katayama.
- The song was mixed by Chris Lord-Alge.

== Chart positions ==
Chart (2005)	Peak position
Canada CHR/Pop Top 30 (Radio & Records)	17
Canada Hot AC Top 30 (Radio & Records)	11
Canada Rock Top 30 (Radio & Records)	3
US Billboard Mainstream Rock Tracks	27

== Certifications ==
Region	Certification	Certified units/sales
Canada (Music Canada)	Platinum	80,000^{‡}
^{‡} Sales+streaming figures based on certification alone.

== Release history ==
Release dates and formats for "Santa Monica"
Region	Date	Format	Label(s)	Ref.
United States	June 13, 2006	Mainstream airplay	Roadrunner	
