= All or Nothing (Theory of a Deadman song) =

Single by Theory of a Deadman

from the album Scars & Souvenirs
- Released: June 2, 2008 (CAN); March 9, 2010 (U.S.)
- Recorded: September 2007–January 2008
- Genre: Alternative rock
- Length: 3:30
- Label: Roadrunner; 604
- Songwriter: Tyler Connolly
- Producer: Howard Benson

Theory of a Deadman singles chronology
"Bad Girlfriend" (2008)	"All or Nothing" (2008)	"Hate My Life" (2008)

Music video
- "All or Nothing" on YouTube

"All or Nothing" is a song by Canadian rock band Theory of a Deadman from their third studio album Scars & Souvenirs (2008). The track was written by the band's lead singer and guitarist, Tyler Connolly, about meeting his wife, and was produced by Howard Benson. It reached number 22 on the Billboard Canadian Hot 100 chart and number 99 on the Billboard Hot 100, and was certified platinum by Music Canada and gold by the Recording Industry Association of America. Its music video was directed by Davin Black and was nominated for three awards at the 2009 MuchMusic Video Awards.

== Background and development ==
"All or Nothing" is a ballad written by Theory of a Deadman's lead singer and guitarist, Tyler Connolly. The lyrics surround the events of when Connolly met his now ex-wife, Canadian actress Christine Danielle.

== Release and commercial performance ==
The song was released in Canada in 2008, peaking at number 22 on the Billboard Canadian Hot 100 chart. It was released in the United States in 2010 where it reached number 99 on the Billboard Hot 100. It also appeared on the Billboard Adult Top 40 and Mainstream Top 40 charts, peaking at numbers 17 and 40, respectively.

The single was certified platinum by Music Canada in 2015 and gold by the Recording Industry Association of America in 2020.

== Music video ==
Directed by Davin Black and produced by Robert Wilson, the music video for "All or Nothing" features the band performing within a crowd of passing people. The storyline is set in the 1950s and focuses on a man leaving for a street race against another group of people much to his significant other's opposition. The video was nominated at the 2009 MuchMusic Video Awards for "Best Director", "Best Cinematography", and "MuchLOUD Best Rock Video".

== Charts ==
=== Weekly charts ===
Chart (2008–2010)	Peak position
Canada Hot 100 (Billboard)	22
Canada AC (Billboard)	38
Canada CHR/Top 40 (Billboard)	6
Canada Hot AC (Billboard)	6
US Billboard Hot 100	99
US Adult Pop Airplay (Billboard)	17
US Pop Airplay (Billboard)	40

=== Year-end charts ===
Chart (2008)	Position
Canada (Canadian Hot 100)	81

== Certifications ==
Region	Certification	Certified units/sales
Canada (Music Canada)	Platinum	80,000^{*}
United States (RIAA)	Gold	500,000^{‡}
^{*} Sales figures based on certification alone.^{‡} Sales+streaming figures based on certification alone.

== Release history ==
Release dates and formats for "All or Nothing"
Region	Date	Format	Label(s)	Ref.
United States	March 9, 2010	Mainstream airplay	Roadrunner	
