= Scars & Souvenirs =

Studio album by Theory of a Deadman
- Released: April 1, 2008; October 20, 2009 (Special edition)
- Recorded: September 2007 – January 2008
- Genre: Hard rock
- Length: 46:11
- Labels: 604, Roadrunner
- Producer: Howard Benson

Theory of a Deadman chronology
Gasoline (2005)	Scars & Souvenirs (2008)	The Truth Is... (2011)

Singles from Scars & Souvenirs
- 1. "So Happy" Released: February 11, 2008; 2. "Bad Girlfriend" Released: May 14, 2008; 3. "All or Nothing" Released: June 2, 2008; 4. "Hate My Life" Released: October 30, 2008; 5. "Not Meant to Be" Released: November 18, 2008; 6. "By the Way" Released: May 18, 2009; 7. "Wait for Me" Released: August 25, 2009; 8. "Little Smirk" Released: January 25, 2010; 9. "End of the Summer" Released: August 30, 2010

Professional ratings
Review scores
Source	Rating
Allmusic	2/5 stars
Only Rock	5/5 stars
Rawkfist Music	7/10 stars
Tunelab	7.5/10 stars
Rock Sound	10/10 stars

Scars & Souvenirs is the third album by Canadian rock band Theory of a Deadman, and was released on April 1, 2008. It has been the band's most successful album to date and has spawned many hit singles. A special edition CD/DVD of the album was released on October 20, 2009. It features bonus and acoustic tracks (some were released on the iTunes version of the album), the band's entire video catalog, and numerous making-of and behind-the-scenes features. Bonus video includes "Haciendas," Tyler's special send-up of MTV's Cribs.

== Titling ==
The title of the album comes from a line in the song "By the Way". The title refers to the "scars and souvenirs," or the ups and downs of one's lifetime, as a large majority of the songs on the album deal with things like relationships and obstacles that one might encounter during his or her life.

== Singles ==
The first single from it, "So Happy" was released to radio on February 11 and can be listened to on their MySpace page while "By the Way" and "Bad Girlfriend" were released on the band's official website on March 10, 2008. "All or Nothing" was released on June 2 as a single for adult and Hot AC radio. Robin Diaz (Closure; Trapt; Daughtry), Chris Daughtry (Daughtry), and Brent Smith (Shinedown) are guests on the album. The band confirmed on May 14, 2008, that the next single to be released in the US and Canada was "Bad Girlfriend", on rock stations only. As of September 6, 2008, "Bad Girlfriend" is Theory of a Deadman's first single to reach number 1 on the Mainstream Rock Chart.

== Reception ==
The album received generally positive reviews from critics. The album debuted at Number 10 on Billboard Top Rock Albums, Number 8 on Billboard Top Modern Rock/Alternative Albums, Number 1 on Billboard Top Hard Rock albums, and Number 26 on the Billboard 200. The album has so far been more successful than the band's previous albums due to the popularity of some of its singles, including "Bad Girlfriend", "Hate My Life", "Not Meant to Be", and "All or Nothing". On March 31, 2021, Scars & Souvenirs was certified 2× Platinum by the RIAA with sales reaching 2,000,000 copies in the United States. On January 23, 2025, it was certified Platinum by Music Canada.

== Track listing ==
All music is composed by Theory of a Deadman.

No.	Title	Lyrics	Length
1.	"So Happy"	Tyler Connolly	4:11
2.	"By the Way"	Connolly, Chris Daughtry	3:35
3.	"Got It Made"	Connolly	3:14
4.	"Not Meant to Be"	Connolly, Kara DioGuardi	3:33
5.	"Crutch"	Connolly, Christine Danielle Connolly	3:16
6.	"All or Nothing"	Connolly	3:30
7.	"Heaven (Little by Little)"	Connolly, C.D.	4:19
8.	"Bad Girlfriend"	Connolly, C.D.	3:25
9.	"Hate My Life"	Connolly, C.D.	3:10
10.	"Little Smirk"	Connolly, C.D.	3:31
11.	"End of the Summer"	Connolly, Zac Maloy	3:30
12.	"Wait for Me"	Connolly	4:03
13.	"Sacrifice"	Connolly	2:54
Total length:			46:11

=== iTunes, Zune and Amazon bonus tracks ===
No.	Title	Length
14.	"Great Pretender"	3:42
15.	"Shadow"	3:48
16.	"So Happy" (acoustic - clean)	4:10
17.	"By the Way" (acoustic)	3:33

=== Special edition bonus tracks ===
No.	Title	Length
14.	"Great Pretender"	3:42
15.	"Shadow"	3:48
16.	"So Happy" (acoustic)	4:10
17.	"By the Way" (acoustic)	3:33
18.	"Not Meant to Be" (acoustic)	3:30
19.	"Got Me Wrong" (Alice In Chains cover)	4:30
20.	"Midnight Rider" (Allman Brothers Band cover)	3:09
21.	"What's Your Name?" (Lynyrd Skynyrd cover)	3:41

=== Special edition DVD tracks ===
No.	Title	Length
1.	"By the Way" (Includes Making Of)
2.	"Not Meant to Be" (Includes Making Of)
3.	"All or Nothing"
4.	"Hate My Life" (Includes Making Of)
5.	"Bad Girlfriend" (Includes Making Of)
6.	"So Happy"
7.	"No Surprise" (from Gasoline)
8.	"Santa Monica" (from Gasoline)
9.	"Make Up Your Mind" (from Theory of a Deadman)
10.	"Nothing Could Come Between Us" (from Theory of a Deadman)
11.	"Hate My Life (Live)"
12.	"Haciendas"
13.	"Press Trailer"

== Personnel ==
Personnel taken from Scars & Souvenirs CD booklet.

Theory of a Deadman

- Tyler Connolly – vocals, guitar
- Dave Brenner – guitar
- Dean Back – bass

Additional musicians

- Robin Diaz – drums
- Howard Benson – B3, keyboards, programming
- Brent Smith – background vocals on "So Happy"
- Chris Daughtry – background vocals on "By the Way"
- Phil X – background vocals on "End of the Summer"

Production

- Howard Benson – production
- Mike Plotnikoff – recording
- Paul Decarli – digital editing
- Hatsukazu Inagaki – additional recording
- Chris Lord-Alge – mixing
- Keith Armstrong – mix assistant
- Nik Karpen – mix assistant
- Ted Jensen – mastering

== Charts ==
=== Weekly charts ===
Weekly chart performance for Scars & Souvenirs
Chart (2008–09)	Peak position
Canadian Albums (Billboard)	2
US Billboard 200	26
US Top Hard Rock Albums (Billboard)	1
US Top Rock Albums (Billboard)	6

=== Year-end charts ===
2008 year-end chart performance for Scars & Souvenirs
Chart (2008)	Position
US Billboard 200	180
US Top Hard Rock Albums (Billboard)	21

2009 year-end chart performance for Scars & Souvenirs
Chart (2009)	Position
US Billboard 200	58
US Top Rock Albums (Billboard)	19

== Certifications ==
Certifications for Scars & Souvenirs
Region	Certification	Certified units/sales
Canada (Music Canada)	2× Platinum	200,000^{‡}
United States (RIAA)	2× Platinum	2,000,000^{‡}
^{‡} Sales+streaming figures based on certification alone.
