= Got Me Wrong =

1994 single by Alice in Chains

Promotional single by Alice in Chains

from the EP Sap
- Released: November 28, 1994
- Recorded: November 1991
- Studio: London Bridge Studio, Seattle, Washington
- Genre: Grunge; alternative rock
- Length: 4:23
- Label: Columbia
- Songwriter: Jerry Cantrell
- Producers: Rick Parashar, Alice in Chains

Alice in Chains singles chronology
"Don't Follow" (1994)	"Got Me Wrong" (1994)	"Grind" (1995)

"Got Me Wrong" is a song by the American rock band Alice in Chains from their second studio EP, Sap (1992). It was written by guitarist and vocalist Jerry Cantrell, who also shared vocals with Layne Staley. A slightly different version of the song also appeared on the soundtrack to the 1994 film Clerks, and is played when the character Randal first appears in the movie. Columbia Records serviced "Got Me Wrong" to US radio on November 28, 1994, after being featured on Clerks. The song was included on the compilation albums Nothing Safe: Best of the Box (1999) and Music Bank (1999). An acoustic version performed on Alice in Chains' MTV Unplugged concert in 1996 was released on a live album and DVD.

== Lyrics ==
In the liner notes of 1999's Music Bank box set collection, guitarist Jerry Cantrell said of the song:

That's about a girl I was dating in between one of the times I broke up with my true love. A lot of times you'll tell someone how you don't want to be in a relationship and why, and what kind of person you are, and they hear all that but think that they can change you. That's what the song's about, getting me wrong and the different ways that men and women see each other.

== Release and reception ==
Columbia Records serviced "Got Me Wrong" to US radio on November 28, 1994, after being featured on Clerks (1994). It peaked at number 7 on the Billboard Mainstream Rock Tracks chart and at number 22 on the Billboard Modern Rock Tracks chart. Both the studio version and the version from Unplugged received significant airplay.

AllMusic's Ned Raggett stated that the song "went a long way towards showing how Alice in Chains could work as effectively at low(er) volume as at high" and that "it's almost one of the warmest and most inspiring things the band had yet recorded — musically, at least."

The song continues to receive significant airplay on SiriusXM's grunge station, Lithium.

== Live performances ==
Alice in Chains guitarist Jerry Cantrell, who wrote the song, also performed it with Stone Temple Pilots on one occasion. Alice in Chains performed an acoustic version of "Got Me Wrong" for its appearance on MTV Unplugged in 1996 and the song was included on the Unplugged live album and home video release. The performance from MTV Unplugged can also be found on Nothing Safe: Best of the Box.

In recent performances without Staley, Cantrell sings lead vocals on the whole song, as opposed to just the choruses. In addition, Staley's replacement, William DuVall, plays the guitar solos throughout the whole song.

== Track listing ==
No.	Title	Length
1.	"Got Me Wrong"	4:23
2.	"No Excuses"	4:10
3.	"Would?"	3:30

== Cover versions ==
This song was covered by the post-grunge band Theory of a Deadman as a b-side for their "Santa Monica" single. A jazz version of the song appears on the pianist Brad Mehldau's 2012 album, Where Do You Start.

== Personnel ==
Personnel taken from Sap liner notes.

- Layne Staley – vocals
- Jerry Cantrell – guitar, vocals
- Michael Starr – bass
- Sean Kinney – drums, percussion

== Chart positions ==
Chart (1995)	Peak position
US Alternative Airplay (Billboard)	22
US Mainstream Rock (Billboard)	7

== Release history ==
Release dates and formats for "Got Me Wrong"
Region	Date	Format(s)	Label(s)	Ref.
United States	November 28, 1994	Radio	Columbia	
