= By the Way (Theory of a Deadman song) =

Single by Theory of a Deadman

from the album Scars & Souvenirs
- Released: May 18, 2009
- Recorded: October 2007
- Genre: Post-grunge, hard rock
- Length: 3:35
- Label: Roadrunner; 604
- Composers: Tyler Connolly; Dave Brenner; Dean Back
- Lyricists: Tyler Connolly; Chris Daughtry
- Producer: Howard Benson

Theory of a Deadman singles chronology
"Not Meant to Be" (2008)	"By the Way" (2009)	"Wait for Me" (2009)

"By the Way" is the sixth single from the Canadian rock band Theory of a Deadman's third studio album Scars & Souvenirs, released on May 18, 2009. The song features Chris Daughtry and Robin Diaz on back-up vocals. It is about a girl leaving her boyfriend without saying anything to him and he now thinks about her all the time and wishes she'd come back. The Scars & Souvenirs album title comes from a line in this song: "Piled up from the years, all those scars and souvenirs".

== Music video ==
The music video came out in the second week of August 2009. It shows Tyler Connolly walking around an abandoned house with his "former wife" as a ghost lurking around him. He picks up emotional objects such as his wedding picture. Near the end of the video, he turns into the ghost and the wife is actually real. She leaves the house with her friends, like he exclaims in the lyrics of the song. Neither Chris Daughtry nor Robin Diaz, who sing backing vocals on the song, are featured in the music video.

== Chart positions ==
Chart (2009)	Peak position
Canada Rock (Billboard)	17
US Mainstream Rock (Billboard)	16
US Hot Rock & Alternative Songs (Billboard)	34
