= Bad Girlfriend =

Single by Theory of a Deadman

from the album Scars & Souvenirs
- Released: May 14, 2008
- Recorded: September 2007–January 2008
- Genre: Hard rock
- Length: 3:25
- Label: Roadrunner; 604
- Songwriters: Tyler Connolly; Dave Brenner; Dean Back; Christine Danielle Connolly
- Producer: Howard Benson

Theory of a Deadman singles chronology
"So Happy" (2008)	"Bad Girlfriend" (2008)	"All or Nothing" (2008)

Music video
- "Bad Girlfriend" on YouTube

"Bad Girlfriend" is the second single from the Canadian rock band Theory of a Deadman's third studio album Scars & Souvenirs. The track's lyrics describe the circumstances of when lead singer and guitarist Tyler Connolly met his now ex-wife in a bar in Vancouver. The band collectively composed the song which was produced by Howard Benson. It peaked at number 42 on the Billboard Canadian Hot 100 chart and number 75 on the Billboard Hot 100, and was their first single to reach number one on the Billboard Mainstream Rock chart, making it the band's most successful release in the United States at the time.

== Background and development ==
"Bad Girlfriend" has been defined as a "tongue in cheek", "party-rocking tune", with lead singer and guitarist Tyler Connolly labeling it a "stripper song". The lyrics describe the events of when Connolly met his now ex-wife, Canadian actress Christine Danielle, at a bar called The Roxy in Vancouver. Howard Benson produced the track and Danielle assisted in the composition of the lyrics, including the explicit opening line, "My girlfriend's a dick magnet".

Guitarist Dave Brenner acknowledged that the "raunchy, funny" tone of the single did not reflect the usual fashion of previous tracks, saying, "It shows a different side of Theory of a Deadman. The past albums have been pretty heavy content-wise and this one shows more of a sense of humor to Theory of a Deadman." Connolly has also addressed that the record label despised the song and didn't want it on the album.

== Release and commercial performance ==
The song was released on May 14, 2008, as the second single off the band's third studio album, Scars & Souvenirs (2008). It peaked at number 42 on the Billboard Canadian Hot 100 chart. In the United States, it reached number 75 on the Billboard Hot 100, making it the first of the band's songs to appear on this particular chart and their most successful single at the time. It peaked at number eight on Billboard's Alternative Songs chart and spent two weeks at number one on the Mainstream Rock chart.

== Music video ==
The music video for "Bad Girlfriend" was directed by Colin Minihan and depicts the band performing as a woman leaves for work at a strip club unbeknownst to her significant other, who attends the club with friends and is surprised to see his girlfriend dancing on stage.

== Charts ==
Chart (2008)	Peak position
Canada (Canadian Hot 100)	42
US Billboard Hot 100 (Billboard)	75
US Alternative Airplay (Billboard)	8
US Mainstream Rock (Billboard)	1

== Certifications ==
Region	Certification	Certified units/sales
Canada (Music Canada)	2× Platinum	160,000^{‡}
United States (RIAA)	3× Platinum	3,000,000^{‡}
^{‡} Sales+streaming figures based on certification alone.
