= No Surprise (Theory of a Deadman song) =

Single by Theory of a Deadman

from the album Gasoline
- Released: February 15, 2005
- Recorded: October 2004–January 2005
- Genre: Hard rock, blues rock
- Length: 3:40
- Label: Roadrunner; 604
- Composers: Tyler Connolly; Dave Brenner; Dean Back
- Lyricist: Tyler Connolly
- Producer: Howard Benson

Theory of a Deadman singles chronology
"The Last Song" (2003)	"No Surprise" (2005)	"Say Goodbye" (2005)

"No Surprise" is the first single from the Canadian rock band Theory of a Deadman's second studio album, Gasoline, released February 12, 2005.

== Charts ==
=== Weekly charts ===
Weekly chart performance for "No Surprise"
Chart (2005)	Peak position
Canada Rock Top 30 (Radio & Records)	1
US Alternative Airplay (Billboard)	24
US Mainstream Rock (Billboard)	8

=== Year-end charts ===
Year-end chart performance for "No Surprise"
Chart (2005)	Position
US Mainstream Rock Tracks (Billboard)	18
US Modern Rock Tracks (Billboard)	91
