= Nikolaj Torp Larsen =

Danish musician (born 1973)

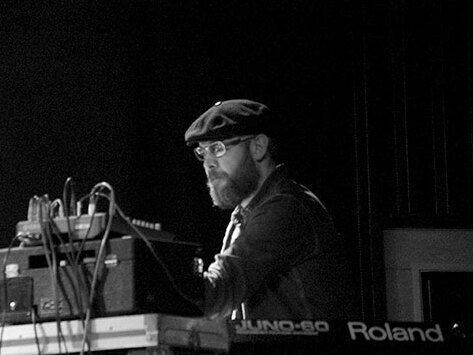
Nikolaj Torp Larsen (2013) in Aarhus, Denmark

Nikolaj Torp Larsen (born 1973) is a Danish musician (also credited as Nikolaj Torp, Nick Torp, Nik Torp). He is also a producer, film composer and writer, who has played keyboards, piano and Hammond with numerous artists on tour and on many successful records, including Adele's "Skyfall" which won the Brit Award for Best British Single at the 2013 Brit Awards, as well as a Grammy, a Golden Globe, and an Academy Award.

== Career ==
Larsen became a professional musician in Denmark at 17, the first band of note being the jazz group Once Around the Park and later joining the band Krajn, which became Cirkus and moved to the UK in 1996, with the other members Kristoffer Sonne, Anders Christiensen, Rune Funch and Jakob Illeborg. The band changed their name again to Warwick Avenue and was signed to Columbia Records in the US, releasing an album, Let it out in 2005.

The band eventually split, with Larsen becoming an in-house session musician for many recordings produced by Martin Terefe in 2006 and later on sessions with producer Paul Epworth, contributing to more than 70 albums by artists including Teitur, James Morrison, Yusuf Islam, Klaus Voormann, Donovan, Jesse & Joy Willie Nelson, Milton Nascimento, Jason Mraz, Train, Tristan Prettyman, Joshua Radin, Howie Day, Amy Winehouse, KT Tunstall, Florence & The Machine, Cee Lo Green, John Legend, Adele, Mark Ronson, Elton John, Olly Murs, Third Eye Blind, Erin McCarley, Laura Izibor, Natalia Jayden, Wild Feathers, Marc Scibilia, Eric Hutchinson, Alyssa Bernal, James Walsh, Katie Mehlua, Dan Kamit, Lana Del Rey, Kira Skov, and many more.

In 2009 Larsen also joined The Specials as the replacement for Jerry Dammers and toured with the band until their dissolution in 2022.

In 2013 Larsen opened Squat Sound, a recording studio in West London, with Dyre Gormsen and Kristoffer Sonne, the three together known as "The Suppliers", with their own label imprint, Squat Sound. Their first signing was Rob Bravery, whose album Esque was released in June 2015. The second signing to Squat Sound was Rocky Nti, whose EP Ride On was released on the 29 June 2015.

In 2014 Larsen started work on the film score for the feature thriller In Embryo, by first-time director and well-known actor Ulrich Thomsen. In 2015 Larsen started scoring the feature film "Framing Mom" Directed by Norwegian Sarah Johnsen, which was released in 2016.

In 2018 Larsen co-produced, co-wrote and played on The Specials album Encore, which was released in February 2019, becoming their first ever UK No. 1 Album. In 2019 he was musical director, played on and co-wrote two songs on the Jack Savoretti album Singing To Strangers, which also went number 1 in the UK in 2019. Larsen also co-wrote and co-produced Jack Savoretti's single "Christmas Morning" released on 8 November 2019.

In 2020 Larsen played on and co-wrote four songs on Paul Epworth's album Voyager as well as performing on records for 2021 release by Arlo Parks, Jack Savoretti, Lola Young and George Ezra amongst others. During this period Larsen wrote the score for the multiple award winning British film How to stop a recurring dream, which featured actress Ruby Barker and later appearing in Bridgerton.

In 2021 Larsen co-produced and played on The Specials next album, Protest Songs 1924-2012, which was released on 1 October 2021, reaching No.2 in the UK charts.

In December 2020, Larsen joined a band of British jazz musicians to play on the Bitches Brew-inspired, self-titled album London Brew, which was released on 31 March 2023 by Concord Jazz.

== Discography ==
=== Solo ===
- Epilog (1992) - Mikala Krogh/Sara Bro
- In Embryo (2016) - Ulrich Thomsen
- Framing Mom (orig. Rosemari) (2016) - Sara Johnsen
- Gutterbee (2019) - Ulrich Thomsen (as additional Composer)
- How to Stop a Recurring Dream (2021) - Ed Morris
- Michelin Stars II: Nordic by Nature (2021)

=== Collaborations with Jonas Struck ===
- The Newsroom: Off the Record (orig. Ekstra Bladet: Uden for citat) (2014) – Mikala krogh
- The Idealist (orig. Idealisten) (2015) – Christina Rosendahl
- Den Anden Side (2017) – Pernille Rose Grønkjær
- Qeda – Man Divided (2017) – Max Kestner
- Handle With Care (orig. Hjertestart) (2017) – Arild Andresen
- Borg (2017) – Janus Metz Pedersen
