= Not Meant to Be =

Single by Theory of a Deadman

from the album Scars & Souvenirs
- Released: November 18, 2008
- Recorded: September 2007–January 2008
- Genre: Alternative rock
- Length: 3:33
- Label: Roadrunner; 604
- Composers: Tyler Connolly; Dave Brenner; Dean Back
- Lyricists: Tyler Connolly; Kara DioGuardi
- Producer: Howard Benson

Theory of a Deadman singles chronology
"Hate My Life" (2008)	"Not Meant to Be" (2008)	"By the Way" (2009)

"Not Meant to Be" is a song recorded by Canadian rock group Theory of a Deadman for their third studio album, Scars & Souvenirs (2008). Band members Tyler Connolly, Dave Brenner, and Dean Back composed the song, while Connolly co-wrote the lyrics with songwriter and producer Kara DioGuardi. The song was released November 18, 2008 as the album's fifth overall radio single. It was the first song from the album to impact mainstream radio in the United States, concurrent with the release of "Hate My Life" to rock formats. In 2009, "Not Meant to Me" was included on the soundtrack to the science fiction action film, Transformers: Revenge of the Fallen despite not appearing in the film.

"Not Meant to Be" became the group's highest-charting entry in the United States, peaking at number 55 on the Billboard Hot 100 as well as their first top ten hit on the Billboard Adult Top 40 airplay chart. The song has been certified Platinum by both Music Canada and the Recording Industry Association of America (RIAA).

== Content ==
"Not Meant to Be" is a ballad with influences of pop and rock music composed in the key of A minor and set in common time to a "slow" tempo of 120 BPM. The vocals range over two octaves from D_{4} to G_{5}. The song is written from the point of view of a man who wants to be with his ex-girlfriend so much after their relationship ends, but she is never satisfied with him and keeps pushing him away, leaving him thinking that their relationship is "not meant to be." Lead vocalist Tyler Connolly co-wrote the lyrics with Kara DioGuardi at the latter's house. "We wrote 'Not Meant To Be' in 5 minutes," Connolly said in a 2009 interview with The Gauntlet. "Our writing styles fit together so perfectly it was almost like it was 'meant to be.'" In the same interview, DioGuardi stated that "the best part about my job is that you never know who you are going to meet, and who's going to inspire you. Although I'd never worked with Tyler, when he started singing the song, I knew we were onto something special." The song's mid-tempo composition has been compared to the work of labelmates Nickelback.

== Critical reception ==
In a review of the album Scars & Souvenirs for AllMusic, Katherine Fulton identified "Not Meant to Be" as an example of the album's "derivative" sound, writing that its "melody and chorus bear more than a passing resemblance to" Nickelback's 2006 single "Rockstar".

== Music video ==
The band filmed the music video with Tony Petrossian in February 2009. It features Kara DioGuardi (the song's co-writer) as the love interest. It was released on March 25, 2009. The video begins when Kara walks out on Tyler, breaks up with him and drives away. By the first chorus in the song, all of the non-singing scenes start running backwards: all the objects in the house (including a fish tank, a wine rack, a mirror, a table, two chairs and more) change from broken to unbroken and Kara's car is also shown travelling backwards, implying that the whole timeline of the main story is running in reverse. At the end of the video, Kara goes back to the house and hugs Tyler. The final scene depicts Tyler and Kara hugging each other.

== Track listing ==
Digital EP – released July 10, 2009

1. "Not Meant to Be" — 3:35
2. "Not Meant to Be" (Acoustic) — 3:29
3. "Not Meant to Be" (Music Video) — 3:33

== Chart positions ==
"Not Meant to Be" debuted at number 90 on the Billboard Hot 100 chart dated April 25, 2009. It later peaked at number 55 on the chart dated July 4, 2009, the group's highest-charting entry to date. The song experienced similar success in Canada, reaching number 53 on the Canadian Hot 100.

=== Weekly charts ===
Chart (2009)	Peak position
Canada (Canadian Hot 100)	53
Canada AC (Billboard)	23
Canada CHR/Top 40 (Billboard)	21
Canada Hot AC (Billboard)	13
Canada Rock (Billboard)	18
Mexico Ingles Airplay (Billboard)	46
UK Rock & Metal (OCC)	34
US Billboard Hot 100	55
US Adult Contemporary (Billboard)	28
US Adult Pop Airplay (Billboard)	4
US Pop Airplay (Billboard)	19

=== Year-end charts ===
Chart (2009)	Position
US Adult Top 40 (Billboard)	20

== Certifications and sales ==
Region	Certification	Certified units/sales
Canada (Music Canada)	Platinum	80,000^{‡}
United States (RIAA)	2× Platinum	2,000,000^{‡}
^{‡} Sales+streaming figures based on certification alone.
