= The Truth Is... (Theory of a Deadman album) =

Studio album by Theory of a Deadman
- Released: July 12, 2011
- Genre: Hard rock
- Length: 46:05
- Label: 604, Roadrunner
- Producer: Howard Benson

Theory of a Deadman chronology
Scars & Souvenirs (2008)	The Truth Is... (2011)	Savages (2014)

Singles from The Truth Is...
- 1. "Lowlife" Released: May 17, 2011; 2. "Out of My Head" Released: June 14, 2011; 3. "Bitch Came Back" Released: August 15, 2011; 4. "Hurricane" Released: January 17, 2012; 5. "Gentleman" Released: September 2012

The Truth Is... is the fourth studio album by rock band Theory of a Deadman, released on July 12, 2011. The first single, "Lowlife", was released to radio stations on May 17, 2011. It went to number 1 on the US rock charts. It was co-written by Christine Danielle Connolly. It is their first album with drummer Joey Dandeneau.

== Critical reception ==
Professional ratings
Aggregate scores
Source	Rating
Metacritic	35/100
Review scores
Source	Rating
AllMusic	1/5 stars
Billboard	3.5/5 stars
Consequence	F
Kerrang!	3/5 stars
Q	1/5 stars

According to the review aggregator Metacritic, The Truth Is... received "generally unfavorable reviews" based on a weighted average score of 35 out of 100 from 5 critic scores.

AllMusic and Q both gave it a single star. Consequence gave it an "F", Alex Young writing "Save for some throwback vibes at the first half–maybe four good tracks–this record is dull beyond words".

Kerrang! and Billboard rated it slightly above average, with Billboard staff calling it "some of the most ambitiously arranged and melodically polished tunes it has released to date" and "Theory's most distinctive album yet".

== Commercial performance ==
In the United States, the album debuted at number 8 on the Billboard 200 chart selling 38,000 copies. On March 31, 2021, the RIAA certified the album Gold. In Canada, the album debuted at number 2 on the Canadian Albums Chart, selling 8,500 copies. This is an increase in sales from their previous album, Scars & Souvenirs, which sold 6,000 copies in its first week.

== Track listing ==
Track list adapted from AllMusic:

No.	Title	Writer(s)	Length
1.	"Lowlife"	Christine Connolly, Theory of a Deadman	3:25
2.	"Bitch Came Back"	Harry S. Miller, Kara DioGuardi, Theory of a Deadman	3:39
3.	"Hurricane"	Kara DioGuardi, Theory of a Deadman	4:17
4.	"Out of My Head"	Brett James, Connolly	3:57
5.	"Gentleman"	Kara DioGuardi, Theory of a Deadman	3:28
6.	"Love is Hell"	Dana Calitri, Nina Ossoff, Kathy Sommer, Theory of a Deadman	3:31
7.	"The Truth Is... (I Lied About Everything)"	Christine Connolly, Theory of a Deadman	3:27
8.	"Head Above Water"	Scott Stevens, Theory of a Deadman	3:32
9.	"Drag Me to Hell"	Theory of a Deadman	3:54
10.	"What Was I Thinking"	Theory of a Deadman, Christine Connolly	3:50
11.	"Easy to Love You"	Theory of a Deadman	4:19
12.	"We Were Men"	Theory of a Deadman	4:46
Total length:			46:05

Special edition bonus tracks
No.	Title	Writer(s)	Length
13.	"Careless"	Theory of a Deadman	3:36
14.	"Does It Really Matter"	Theory of a Deadman, Christine Connolly	3:40
15.	"Villain"	Theory of a Deadman	3:04
16.	"Better or Worse"	Theory of a Deadman	4:21
17.	"Out of My Head (Acoustic)"	Theory of a Deadman, Brett James	3:53
18.	"Easy to Love You (Acoustic)"	Theory of a Deadman	4:19
Total length:			68:58

Pre-order and website bonus tracks
No.	Title	Writer(s)	Length
19.	"Lowlife (Acoustic)"	Christine Connolly, Theory of a Deadman	3:21
20.	"Gentlemen (Acoustic)"	DioGuardi, Theory of a Deadman	3:26
Total length:			75:45

== Personnel ==
- Tyler Connolly – lead vocals, lead guitar
- Dave Brenner – rhythm guitar, vocals
- Dean Back – bass, vocals
- Joey Dandeneau – drums, percussion, vocals

Production

- Howard Benson - producer
- Mike Plotnikoff - recording
- Hatsikazu "Hatch" Inagaki - engineer
- Chris Lord-Alge - mixing
- Ted Jensen - mastering at Sterling Sound, NYC, NY

== Charts ==
=== Weekly charts ===
Chart (2011)	Peak position
Canadian Albums (Billboard)	2
German Albums (Offizielle Top 100)	94
Scottish Albums (OCC)	60
UK Albums (OCC)	68
US Billboard 200	8
US Top Alternative Albums (Billboard)	1
US Top Hard Rock Albums (Billboard)	1
US Top Rock Albums (Billboard)	1
US Indie Store Album Sales (Billboard)	9

=== Year-end charts ===
Chart (2011)	Position
US Top Rock Albums (Billboard)	47

== Certifications ==
Region	Certification	Certified units/sales
Canada (Music Canada)	Gold	40,000^{^}
United States (RIAA)	Gold	500,000^{‡}
^{^} Shipments figures based on certification alone.^{‡} Sales+streaming figures based on certification alone.
