= Theory of a Deadman =

Canadian rock band

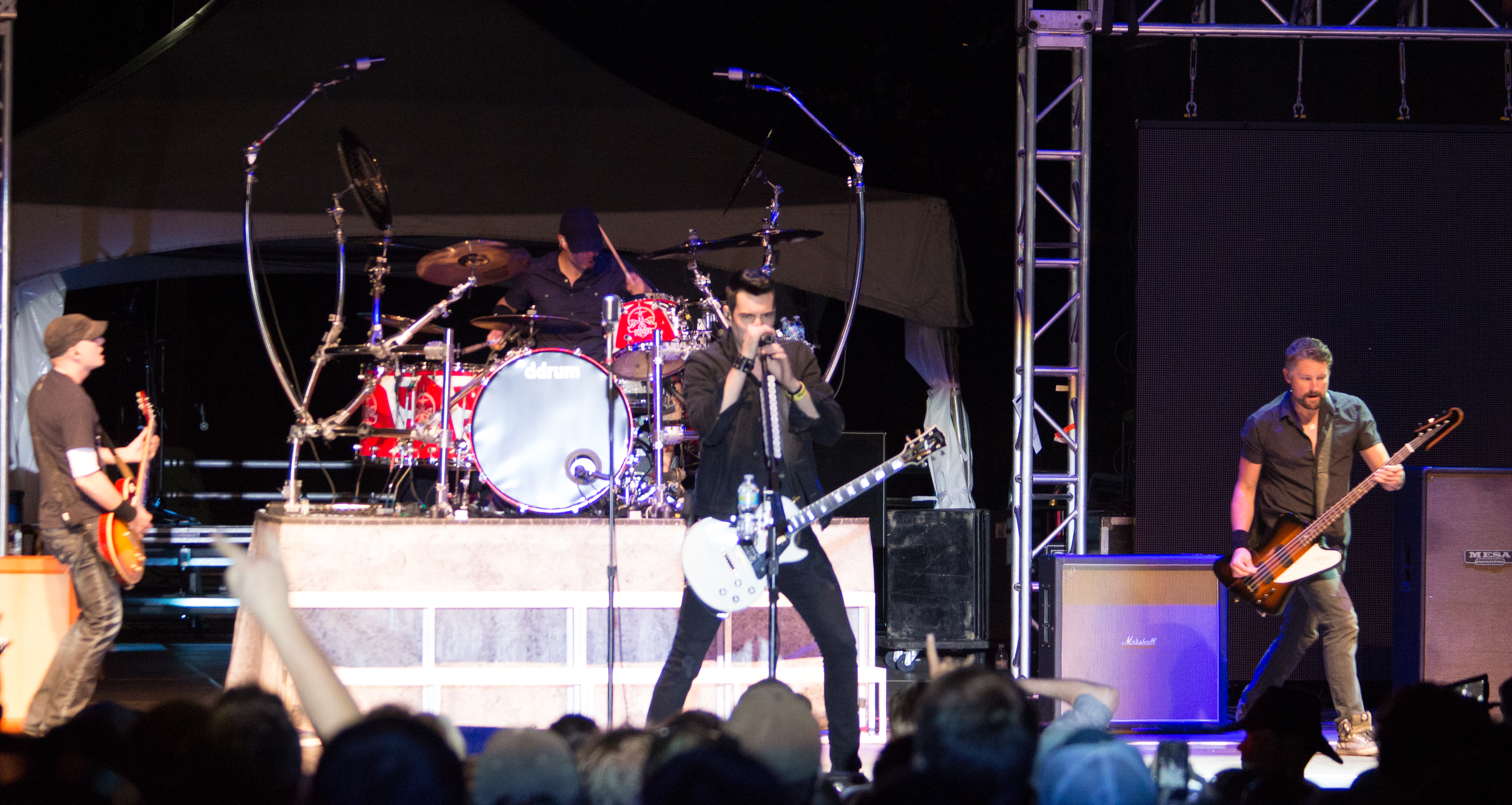
- Theory of a Deadman performing at Festival of Friends 2013

Background information
- Also known as: Theory; T.O.A.D
- Origin: North Delta, British Columbia, Canada
- Genres: Post-grunge; hard rock; alternative rock; pop rock
- Years active: 1999–present
- Labels: 604; Roadrunner; Island; Atlantic
- Members: Tyler Connolly; Dave Brenner; Dean Back; Joey Dandeneau
- Past members: Tim Hart; Brent Fitz; Robin Diaz
- Website: theoryofficial.com

Theory of a Deadman (abbreviated as Theory or T.O.A.D) is a Canadian rock band from North Delta, British Columbia. Formed in 1999, the band is currently signed to Roadrunner Records as well as 604 Records. The band's music has hints of various music styles, such as country and acoustic, in addition to their post-grunge and alternative rock foundation. Nine of their singles have entered the top ten of the US Billboard Mainstream Rock chart, including four songs that peaked at number one: "Bad Girlfriend", "Lowlife", "Rx (Medicate)", and "History of Violence".

== History ==
The band's logo from 2008 to 2017

=== Early years and self-titled album (1999–2003) ===
Theory of a Deadman was initially formed in 1999 by lead guitarist/vocalist Tyler Connolly and bassist Dean Back. They later became the first act to sign with Nickelback frontman Chad Kroeger's 604 Records imprint in 2001 after Connolly convinced Kroeger's ex-girlfriend Jodi to send him a copy of their first demo recording. Shortly afterwards; Kroeger invited Connolly to a barbecue and discussed giving his band a record deal soon after. They released their eponymous debut album Theory of a Deadman on September 17, 2002, co produced by Kroeger. The name of the band comes from a song from their first album, whose lyrics describe a man preparing to commit suicide. That track was later renamed "The Last Song". The album was a large success for the band in North America, peaking at #4 in Canada and #85 in the US. The band would later tour in support of the album as an opening act for Nickelback throughout 2002 and 2003. The album was certified platinum in the United States and Canada on May 12, 2006.

=== Gasoline (2005–2007) ===
On March 29, 2005, Theory of a Deadman released their second album, Gasoline. After the release of the album, the band toured with Shinedown and No Address. Starting on March 1, 2005, Theory began a promotional tour, headlined by Breaking Benjamin and The Exies. Songs from Gasoline appeared in the soundtrack of the 2005 video game Fahrenheit, which was released under the title Indigo Prophecy in the United States.

The band performed the theme song to World Wrestling Entertainment's No Way Out 2006 pay-per-view, a cover version of "Deadly Game" from the WWE Anthology album. The song was released on the WWE Wreckless Intent album. They also did a cover of "No Chance In Hell", the theme song for WWE chairman Vince McMahon. The song was released on WWE The Music, Vol. 8 on March 25, 2008. They also performed the theme song for the 2011 edition of the WWE pay-per-view SummerSlam.

=== Scars & Souvenirs (2008–2009) ===
On April 1, 2008, Theory of a Deadman released their third album, Scars & Souvenirs, from which they released eight singles: "So Happy", "By the Way", "Little Smirk", "Bad Girlfriend", "All or Nothing", "Hate My Life", "Not Meant to Be", and "Wait for Me". The song "By the Way" features vocals from Chris Daughtry and Robin Diaz. On April 6, 2008, they appeared at the Juno Awards in Calgary, Alberta, after making various stops across Canada in a promotion known as Journey to the Junos.

Theory also performed in the 96th Grey Cup halftime show, along with Suzie McNeil and Andree Watters, on November 23, 2008. Along with Hinder, they supported Mötley Crüe during the 2008/2009 tour. They also played at Crüe Fest 2.

Total Nonstop Action used Theory of a Deadman's song "Got it Made", from the album Scars & Souvenirs, for their special 2008 year review video. The song later went on to be used by Sun Sports for Miami Heat post-game video recaps during the 2010-11 season. It was also used in the NASCAR 09 video game.

On April 9, 2009, Scars & Souvenirs was certified gold by the RIAA, with sales reaching 500,000 copies in the U.S. alone.

=== The Truth Is... (2010–2012) ===
In late 2010, it was announced that the band would start recording their fourth studio album, which was projected to be released in mid-2011. It was then confirmed by Tyler Connolly that the band's fourth album would be released on July 12, 2011. The first single from the album, "Lowlife", was released on May 17, 2011. The title of the upcoming album was announced to be The Truth Is...

In 2011, Theory co-headlined the second annual Carnival of Madness Tour with Alter Bridge. The supporting bands were Black Stone Cherry, Adelitas Way, and Emphatic. The band contributed a new song, which was co-written with The Exies singer Scott Stevens, called "Head Above Water", to the Transformers: Dark of the Moon soundtrack, which was released on June 14, 2011. Another track titled "Drag Me to Hell" was made available for free through the official Roadrunner Records website on June 16, 2011. The second official single, "Out Of My Head", was released on June 14, 2011. On July 1, 2011, the unreleased single, "Let Me Go", featuring Pop Idol's Cveta Majtanović, was also released via CloudMusic and for the parted collaboration music video.

=== Savages and Angel Acoustic EP (2013–2016) ===
On November 9, 2013, it was confirmed via Theory's Twitter page that pre-production on their fifth album had started. In January 2014, they stated that they were "finishing up record number 5 next week" with release dates and news soon to come. In April 2014, Theory of a Deadman announced that a new single titled "Drown" would be released in April, with their new album Savages released in July. The song "Panic Room" from the album would serve as the theme song for WWE's October pay-per-view Hell in a Cell.

On April 28, 2015 the band released a 5 track acoustic EP titled Angel. On November 11, 2016, the band released a cover of the song "Hallelujah" by Leonard Cohen, a tribute in recognition of his death on the seventh of the same month.

=== Wake Up Call (2017–2018) ===
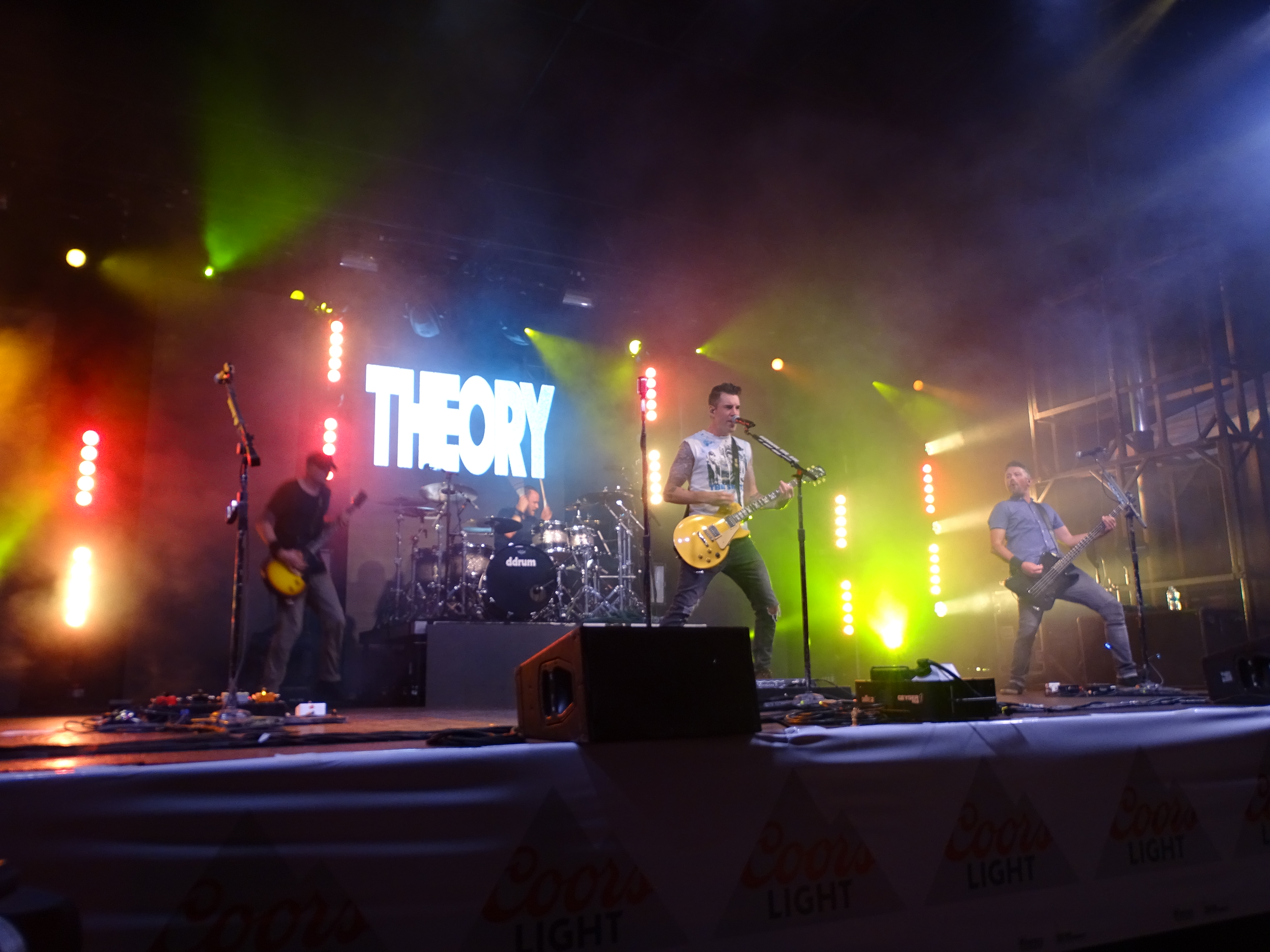
Theory of a Deadman performing at the Naval Station Great Lakes, on July 3, 2018

In January 2017, the band announced that they were recording their sixth studio album. They released two cover singles shortly after—Sting's "Shape of My Heart" in February and Major Lazer's "Cold Water" on March 17. Instead of working with the same production team in Los Angeles that they had used for their previous four albums, they decided to work with Swedish music producer Martin Terefe, and spent seven weeks recording in London at Terefe's Kensaltown Studios. The group announced the name of their upcoming album—Wake Up Call—on July 27, 2017, with the release of its lead single, "Rx (Medicate)". The song, which handles the topic of prescription drug addiction, topped the Billboard US Mainstream Rock Songs chart for six consecutive weeks later that year, and earned the band a "No. 1 Song Award" from the Society of Composers, Authors and Music Publishers of Canada (SOCAN).

With the release of the new album, the band decided to undergo a name change, shortening it to Theory. The group cited that discussions involving the name of their band with people who are unfamiliar with their music was challenging. Connolly equated it to rock band Red Hot Chili Peppers frequently abbreviating their name to Chili Peppers.

Wake Up Call has been described by critics as a departure from Theory of a Deadman's usual hard rock foundation, moving into pop and pop rock territory. To promote the album, the band launched a 33-city tour in the United States during the fall of 2017. The tour was extended into 2018 to include shows throughout western Canada and Europe, and the group toured in Australia for the first time in their career in June 2018. Connolly told The Music, "There's a real dichotomy of Theory now, two very different sides. Not that we want to get away from our old songs, but the new songs are so diverse, such a juxtaposition. We're really working on building a big show, and trying to make it all more visual, as well."

=== Say Nothing (2019–2022) ===
The band returned to London in April 2019 to begin work on their seventh record with Terefe. In August 2019, Connolly informed the public that the group would continue their 2019 headlining tour efforts in September. On September 25, Theory of a Deadman announced their seventh album, Say Nothing, which was released on January 31, 2020; the news coincided with the release of the first single, accompanied by its music video, "History of Violence", a song that addresses domestic violence. "Strangers" was the second song to be released from Say Nothing and was released on November 8; the track examines the polarizing effect of politics on society and how current events are creating a new generation of activists. It was released simultaneously with an official animated music video.

The band headlined a Canadian tour, beginning on January 31, 2020, to coincide with the release of the album. Two North American tours were scheduled in 2020—one with American band 10 Years, and the second with Breaking Benjamin, Bush, Saint Asonia, and Cory Marks. Both were canceled due to the restrictions on large-scale gatherings on account of the coronavirus global pandemic.

=== Dinosaur (2022–2025) ===
On October 20, 2022, the band released a new single, "Dinosaur", which marked a return to their hard rock sound. The band would release their 8th album titled Dinosaur on March 17, 2023.

Part 1: Funeral Songs (2026-present)

On September 4, 2026, the band released their second EP titled ''Part 1: Funeral Songs''. >https://blabbermouth.net/news/theory-of-a-deadman-announces-new-ep-part-1-funeral-songs

== Musical style ==
Theory of a Deadman's music style has generally been regarded as post-grunge, hard rock, alternative rock, and pop rock. The band also mixes country, pop, and acoustic elements into their sound.

== Reception & legacy ==
Theory of a Deadman has received mixed critical reception, and some publications have referred to them as "butt rock". In 2013, Angelica Leicht of Houston Press listed the band eighth on her list of The 10 Suckiest Bands of the ’00s, where she wrote: "I would take being pepper-sprayed dead in my eye over listening to these guys any day. They’re filled to the brim with misogynistic, self-important suckage, model themselves after Nickelback, and one song has them professing that they’re 'so sick of the hobos.' Really, guys. Please, no ’00s nostalgia, or these fools may find their way onto the bill." One year later in 2014, she lightened her stance toward the band, listing them tenth on her list of the "Top 10 Butt-Rock Bands of All Time". She said: "Truth is we don’t mind TOADM [...] They’re way better than the other contenders in this category, like Hinder. Hinder is terrible, and TOADM way less offensive by comparison, so they win."

Despite the criticism, the band's tracks have appeared on various "best of" lists featuring artists of a similar nature.

== Band members ==
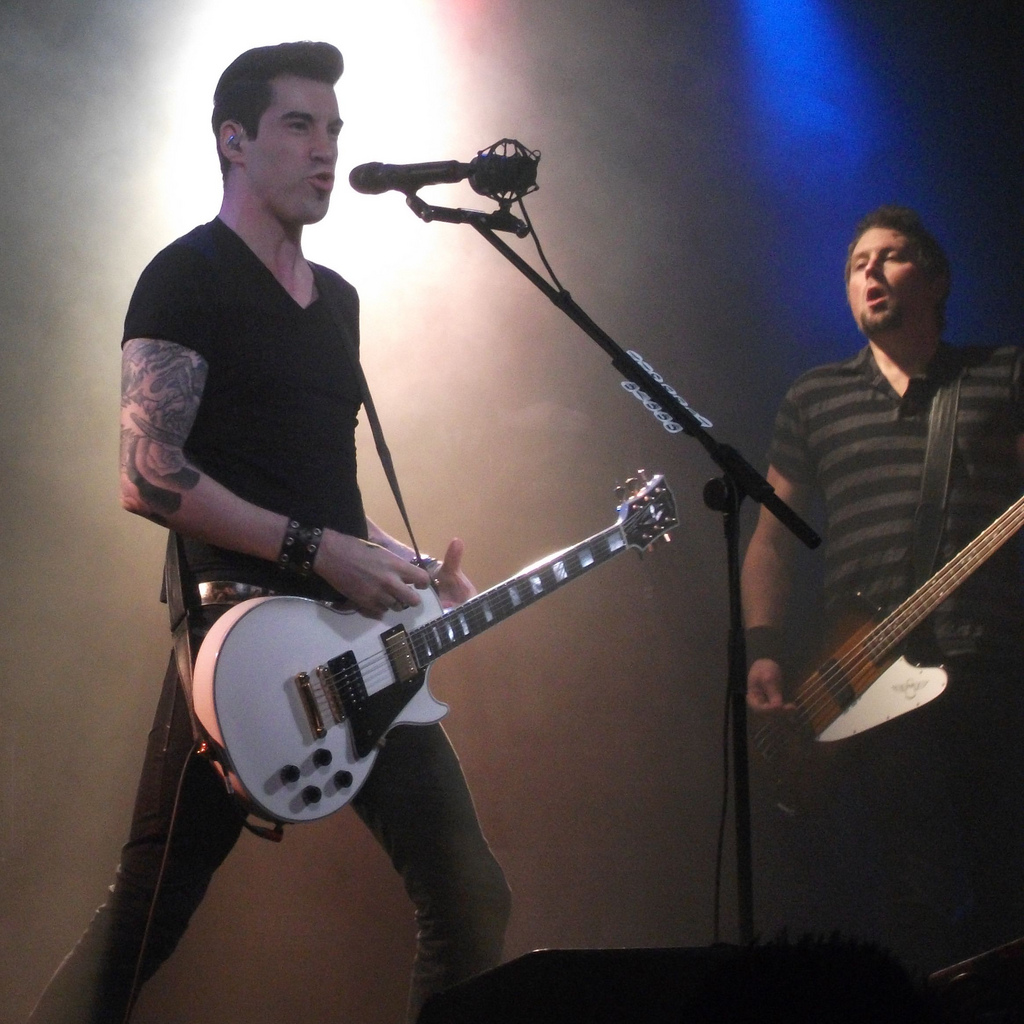
Tyler Connolly & Dean Back, Leeds Met Students' Union, 4/3/2010

Current members

- Tyler Connolly – lead vocals, lead guitar (1999–present), keyboards (2017–present)
- Dave Brenner – rhythm guitar, backing vocals (1999–present)
- Dean Back – bass guitar, backing vocals (1999–present)
- Joey Dandeneau – drums, percussion, backing vocals (2009–present)

Former members

- Tim Hart – drums, backing vocals (1999–2004)
- Brent Fitz – drums, backing vocals (2004–07)
- Robin Diaz – drums, backing vocals (2007–08)

== Discography ==
- Theory of a Deadman (2002)
- Gasoline (2005)
- Scars & Souvenirs (2008)
- The Truth Is... (2011)
- Savages (2014)
- Wake Up Call (2017)
- Say Nothing (2020)
- Dinosaur (2023)

== Awards & nominations ==
Organization	Year	Category/award	Nominee/work	Result	Ref.
BMI Pop Awards	2010	Award-Winning Song (shared with co-writer Kara DioGuardi)	"Not Meant to Be"	Won	
Canadian Radio Music Awards	2009	Fans' Choice Award	Theory of a Deadman	Nominated	
Canadian Radio Music Awards	2010	Fans' Choice Award	Theory of a Deadman	Nominated	
Canadian Radio Music Awards	2010	SOCAN Song of the Year	"Not Meant to Be"	Nominated	
iHeartRadio Music Awards	2018	Rock Song of the Year	"Rx (Medicate)"	Nominated	
Juno Awards	2003	New Group of the Year	Theory of a Deadman	Won	
Juno Awards	2006	Group of the Year	Theory of a Deadman	Nominated	
Juno Awards	2006	Rock Album of the Year	Gasoline	Nominated	
Juno Awards	2018	Fan Choice	Theory	Nominated	
Juno Awards	2018	Rock Album of the Year	Wake Up Call	Nominated	
MuchMusic Video Awards	2012	MuchLOUD Rock Video of the Year	"Chick Came Back"	Nominated	
SOCAN	2010	Pop/Rock Music Award (shared with co-writer Kara DioGuardi)	"Not Meant to Be"	Won	
SOCAN	2012	No. 1 Song Award (shared with co-writer Christine Connolly)	"Lowlife"	Won	
SOCAN	2017	No. 1 Song Award	"Rx (Medicate)"	Won	
Western Canadian Music Awards	2003	Outstanding Rock Recording	Theory of a Deadman	Nominated	
Western Canadian Music Awards	2005	Outstanding Rock Recording	Gasoline	Nominated	
Western Canadian Music Awards	2009	Rock Recording of the Year	Scars & Souvenirs	Won	

Preceded by Lenny Kravitz	Grey Cup Halftime Show; 2008	Succeeded by Blue Rodeo
