= Savage (surname) =

Savage is a surname. Notable people with the name include:

== A–C ==
- Abdou Kareem Savage (c. 1946–2015), Gambian judge, Chief Justice of the Gambia (2006–2009)
- Adam Savage (born 1967), American television co-host of MythBusters
- Agnes Yewande Savage (1906–1964), the first woman in West Africa to train and qualify in orthodox medicine and also the first West African woman to receive a university degree
- Alan Savage (football chairman), chairman of Scottish Premier League team, Inverness Caledonian Thistle
- Alfred Savage (1903–1980), colonial Governor of British Guiana
- Alfred H. Savage (1930–2015), Canadian public transit manager
- Andrea Savage (born 1975), American actress
- Andrew Savage (born 1986), American singer, frontman of rock band Parquet Courts
- Ann Savage (1921–2008), American film actress
- Ann Savage (astronomer) (1946–2017), British astronomer
- Anne Savage, Baroness Berkeley (c. 1496–before 1546), lady-in-waiting to Anne Boleyn, second wife of Henry VIII of England
- Anne Savage (artist) (1896–1971), Canadian painter and art teacher
- Anne Savage (DJ) (born 1969), English disc jockey
- Archie Savage (1914–2003), African-American dancer, choreographer, and film and theatre actor
- Augusta Savage (1892–1962), African-American sculptor of the Harlem Renaissance
- Augustus Chase Savage (1832–1911), American hotelier
- Bas Savage (born 1982), professional English footballer
- Ben Savage (born 1980), American film and TV actor
- Booth Savage (born 1948), Canadian film actor
- Brian K. Savage (born 1955), State of Vermont representative
- Brian Savage (born 1971), retired Canadian professional ice hockey left winger
- Bruce Charles Savage (1906–1993), former United States Public Housing Authority Commissioner under President Dwight D. Eisenhower
- Candace Savage (born 1949), Canadian nature writer
- Carla Savage, American computer scientist and mathematician
- Carrie Savage, American voice actress
- Chantay Savage (born 1971), R&B/dance singer
- Charlie or Charles Savage (disambiguation)

== D–K ==
- Dan Savage (born 1964), sex advice columnist
- Darnell Savage Jr. (born 1997), American football player
- Derek Savage (poet) (1917–2007), pacifist poet and critic
- Derek Savage (Gaelic footballer), former inter-county Gaelic football player for Galway
- Donald Savage (disambiguation), several people
- Doug Savage, Canadian-born author and cartoonist – Savage Chickens
- Douglas Savage (1892–1967), British military aviator
- Dudley Savage (1920–2008), British BBC radio presenter
- Dutch Savage (1935–2013), former professional wrestler
- Edward Savage (footballer) (born 1989), English actor
- Edwin Sidney Savage (1862–1947), English clergyman
- Elizabeth Savage, several people
- Eugene Savage (1883–1978), American painter and sculptor
- Ezra P. Savage (1842–1920), American politician and 16th governor of Nebraska
- Fred Savage (born 1976), American actor and television director
- Fred Lincoln Savage (1861–1924), American architect
- Frederick Savage (disambiguation), several people
- Gary Savage (disambiguation), several people
- George Savage (physician) (1842–1921), British physician
- Gus Savage (1925–2015), American politician
- Herschel Savage (1955–2023), American pornographic actor and director
- I. Richard Savage (1925–2004), American statistician
- Jack Savage (born 1964), American baseball player
- Jack Savage (English footballer) (1929–2009), English footballer
- Jack Savage (Gaelic footballer), Kerry Gaelic footballer
- James Savage (antiquary) (1767–1845), British antiquary
- James Savage (architect) (1779–1852), British architect
- James Savage (banker) (1784–1873), American banker
- James Savage (footballer) (born 1876), English footballer
- James Savage (politician), Canadian politician
- James D. Savage (born 1951), American political scientist
- Jane Savage (1752–1824), English harpsichordist and composer
- Jared Savage (born 1997), American basketball player
- Jay M. Savage (1928–2025), American herpetologist
- Jeffrey Scott Savage (born 1963), American writer
- Jim Savage (1817–1852), American explorer
- Jim Savage (baseball), Professional baseball player
- Jim Savage (shot putter) (1936–2023), New Zealand athlete
- Jimmie Savage (baseball) (1883-1940), American baseball player
- Jimmy Savage (1910–1951), American journalist
- Joe Savage (American football) (1887–1961), American football coach
- Joe Savage (rugby union) (born 1982), Rugby player
- Joel Savage (born 1969), Canadian ice hockey player
- John Savage (actor) (born 1949), American actor
- John Savage (author) (1673–1747), Church of England clergyman and scholar
- John Savage (baseball) (born 1965), American baseball coach
- John Savage (British Columbia politician), Canadian politician
- John Savage (cricketer) (1929–2008), English cricketer
- John Savage (died 1586), English Catholic and conspirator
- John Savage (English footballer) (1867–1951), English footballer
- John Savage (engraver), engraver active in England in the 17th century
- John Savage (Fenian) (1828–1888), Irish poet, journalist and author
- John Savage (Irish politician) (born 1814), Irish politician
- John Savage (Nebraska politician) (1905–1989), American politician
- John Savage (New York politician) (1779–1863), American politician and lawyer
- John Savage (Nova Scotia politician), Premier of Nova Scotia from 1993 to 1997
- John Savage (soldier) (1444–1492), English knight
- John Savage (surgeon) (1770–1838), English surgeon
- John Boscawen Savage (1760–1843), British marine officer
- John E. Savage, American computer scientist
- John H. Savage (1815–1904), American politician
- John J. Savage (1910–1973), American politician
- John L. Savage (1879–1967), American civil engineer
- John S. Savage (1841–1884), American politician
- Jon Savage (born 1953), English music journalist
- Joseph Savage (1879–1956), American figure skater
- Josh Savage (born 1980), American football player
- Julia Savage (born 2007), Australian actress

== L–Q ==
- Lara Mussell Savage, a two-time world champion in the sport Ultimate
- Leona Savage Osterman, American politician
- Leonard Jimmie Savage (1917–1971), American mathematician and statistician
- Levi Savage Jr. (1820–1910), prominent figure in the history of The Church of Jesus Christ of Latter-day Saints
- M. Susan Savage (born 1952), American Democratic politician and 29th Secretary of State of Oklahoma
- Mark Savage (Australian film director) (born 1962), Australian film/television screenwriter and film director
- Mark Savage (American playwright) (born 1958), American screenwriter
- Marshall Savage, advocate of space travel and founder of the Living Universe Foundation
- Martin Savage (Irish republican) (1898–1919), officer in the Dublin Brigade of the Irish Republican Army
- Martin Savage (actor), English actor
- Mary Stebbins Savage (1850–1915), American writer, poet
- Matt Savage (American musician) (born 1992), American autistic savant musician
- Matt Savage (British musician) (born 1972), English actor and musician
- Matt Savage (poker director), American poker tournament director
- Michael Joseph Savage (1872–1940), first Labour Party prime minister of New Zealand
- Michael Savage (born 1942), American radio host, author, and conservative political commentator
- Michael Savage (politician) (born 1960), Canadian politician
- Mildred Savage (1919–2011), American author
- Minot Judson Savage (1841–1918), American Unitarian minister and author
- Norman Savage (1930–1973), British film editor
- Pat Savage (1882–1969), Scottish footballer
- Patrick Savage (judge), Niuean chief justice
- Patrick Savage (composer/musician), Australian-born film composer and violinist
- Paul Savage (disambiguation)
- Phil Savage (born 1965), former Senior Vice President and General Manager of the Cleveland Browns
- Philip Henry Savage (1868–1899) poet, son of Minot Judson Savage

== R–Z ==
- Randy Savage (1952–2011), the ring name of American professional wrestler Randy Poffo
- Reggie Savage (born 1970), former Canadian ice hockey player
- Richard Savage (disambiguation)
- Rick Savage (born 1960), bassist and founder of the English rock band, Def Leppard
- Robbie Savage (born 1974), Welsh professional footballer
- Robbie Savage (footballer born 1960), English footballer who played as a midfielder
- Robert Savage (disambiguation)
- Roz Savage (born 1967), British politician, rower, environmental campaigner
- Ruby Cutter Savage (1876–1949), American soprano
- Russell Savage (born 1948), former independent member for the Victorian Legislative seat of Mildura
- Scott Savage, author
- Seán Savage (1965–1988), member (volunteer) of the Provisional Irish Republican Army
- Steele Savage (1898 or 1900–1970), American illustrator
- Stefan Savage (born 1969), American computer science researcher
- Stephanie Savage (born 1969), producer of Wonderland Sound and Vision
- Swede Savage (1946–1973), American race car driver
- Ted Savage (footballer) (1911–1964), English footballer for Liverpool
- Thomas/Tom Savage (disambiguation)
- Tiwa Savage (born 1980), Nigerian musician
- Tracie Savage (born 1962), American actress and journalist
- William Alfred Savage (1912–1942), English able seaman in the Royal Navy and recipient of the Victoria Cross
- William Savage (1720–1789), English composer, organist, and singer
- William H. Savage (1840–1930), American politician
- W. Sherman Savage (1890–1981), American historian and educator
- Xavier Savage, Australian rugby league footballer

== Fictional characters ==
- Bill Savage, character in the comic, 2000 AD
- Charles-Haden Savage, character portrayed by Steve Martin in Only Murders in the Building
- Doc Savage, pulp hero of the 1930s and 1940s
- Ethel P. Savage, the protagonist of the 1950 play The Curious Savage
- Gary Savage, scientist in Deus Ex
- Lily Savage, drag character performed by Paul O'Grady
- Patricia Savage, cousin of fictional hero Doc Savage
- Scandal Savage, daughter of the fictional Vandal Savage
- Vandal Savage, supervillain in the DC Comics Universe

== See also ==
- Savage (disambiguation)
- Sauvage (disambiguation), French for "savage"
- Savige (disambiguation)
- Savidge (disambiguation)
