= John Savage =

John Savage may refer to:

== People ==
=== Arts and entertainment ===
- John Savage (engraver) (fl. 1690–1700), printseller in London
- John Savage (author) (1673–1747), English clergyman and scholar
- John Savage (Fenian) (1828–1888), poet, journalist and author
- John Savage (actor) (born 1949), actor
- Jon Savage (born 1953), writer, broadcaster and music journalist

=== Military ===
- Sir John Savage (soldier) (1444–1492), knight and military commander
- John Savage (died 1586), soldier and co-conspirator in the 1586 Babington Plot to assassinate Elizabeth I of England
- Sir John Boscawen Savage (1760–1843), Royal Marines officer served as head of the Royal Marines

=== Politics ===
- John Savage (died 1615), landowner, MP for Cheshire in 1586 and 1589
- John Savage, 2nd Earl Rivers (1603–1654), royalist and nobleman from Cheshire
- John Savage (New York politician) (1779–1863), congressman from New York
- John Savage (Irish politician) (1814–1883), mayor of Belfast, Ireland (now Northern Ireland)
- John H. Savage (1815–1904), congressman from Tennessee
- John S. Savage (1841–1884), congressman from Ohio
- John J. Savage (1910–1973), American politician from Florida
- John Savage (Nebraska politician) (1905–1989), American politician from Nebraska
- John Savage (Nova Scotia politician) (1932–2003), doctor and premier of Nova Scotia
- John Savage (British Columbia politician) (1936–2018), member of the Legislative Assembly of British Columbia

=== Science, engineering ===
- John Savage (surveyor), 18th century surveyor for Thomas Fairfax, 6th Lord Fairfax of Cameron
- John Savage (surgeon) (1770–1838), English naval surgeon and travel writer on the Antipodes
- John L. Savage (1879–1967), American civil engineer and United States Bureau of Reclamation design chief
- John E. Savage, computer scientist and Brown University professor

=== Sports ===
- John Savage (cricketer) (1929–2008), English cricketer
- Jack Savage (English footballer) (1929–2009), English goalkeeper
- John Savage (English footballer) (1867–1951), English footballer
- Jack Savage (Gaelic footballer), Kerry player
- Jack Savage (born 1964), baseball player
- John Savage (baseball) (born 1965), baseball head coach
- John Savage, early ring name of John Hindley (born 1965), British retired professional wrestler

== Fictional characters ==
- John the Savage, a character in the novel Brave New World
- John Savage, central character in the novel The Meadows of the Moon by James Hilton
- John Savage, a fictional character from the 1937 film Who Killed John Savage?

== Other uses ==
- Savage Arena, Toledo, Ohio, USA; formerly John F. Savage Hall, basketball arena for University of Toledo

== See also ==
- John Savage Bolles (1905–1983), American architect
