= James Savage =

James Savage may refer to:

- Jim Savage (1817–1852), California pioneer
- Jim Savage (athlete) (1936–2023), Paralympic athlete from New Zealand
- James Savage (antiquary) (1767–1845), English writer
- James Savage (banker) (1784–1873), wrote dictionary on first settlers of New England
- James Savage (footballer) (1876–?), English professional footballer
- James Savage (architect) (1779–1852), British architect
- James Savage (politician), Canadian politician
- James D. Savage (born 1951), political science professor at the University of Virginia
- Leonard Jimmie Savage (1917–1971), known as Jimmie, American mathematician and statistician
- Jimmie Savage (baseball) (James Harold Savage, 1883–1940), Major League Baseball outfielder
- Jimmy Savage (James R. Savage, 1910–1951), Chicago show businessman and Chicago Tribune columnist
- James Savage (born 1969), American rapper also known as Jayo Felony

== See also ==
- Savage (surname)
