= Ruby (given name) =

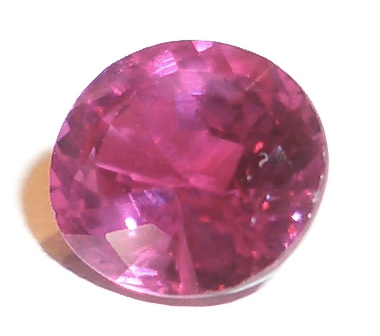
- The name Ruby is taken from the name of the gemstone ruby.
- Pronunciation: /ˈruːbi/ ROO-bee
- Gender: female

Origin
- Origin: Latin
- Meaning: "ruby"

Other names
- Related names: Reuben, Rubi

Ruby is a predominantly feminine given name taken from the name of the gemstone ruby. The name of the gemstone comes from the Latin rubinus, meaning red. The ruby is the birthstone for the month of July.

The name first came into wide use for girls in the late Victorian era, along with other jewel names.

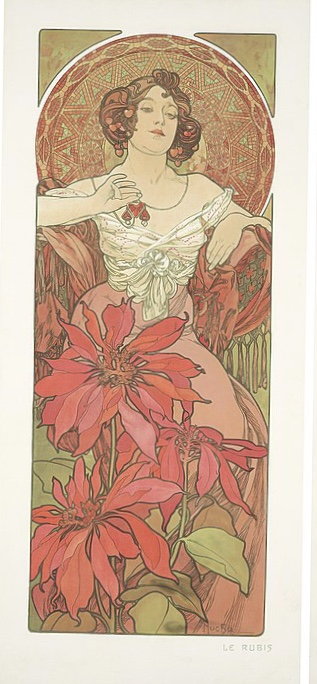
Ruby by Alfons Mucha, 1900

== Popularity ==
Ruby is a currently well-used name for girls in English-speaking countries. The name was also once rarely given to boys in the United States and was ranked in the top 1,000 names given to boys born in that country between 1900 and 1940. In its masculine form, it is occasionally used as a nickname for the name Reuben.

Authors Pamela Redmond Satran and Linda Rosenkrantz noted in their 2007 book Baby Name Bible that Ruby is a "vibrant" name with a "sassy and sultry" image, while Laura Wattenberg wrote in her 2005 book The Baby Name Wizard: A Magical Method for Finding the Perfect Name For Your Baby that Ruby has the image of a woman "kicking up her heels" at a music hall.

== Notable people ==
Notable people with the name include:

- Ruby Andrews, born Ruby Mae Stackhouse (1947–2026), American R&B/soul singer
- Ruby Star Andrews (born 2004), New Zealand freestyle skier
- Ruby Ashbourne Serkis (born 1998), English actress
- Ruby Barker (born 1996), British actress
- Ruby Bhatia (born 1973), Indian-Canadian actress, and television host
- Ruby Bradley (1907–2002), United States Army nurse
- Ruby Bridges (born 1954), American activist, first African-American child to attend an all-white elementary school in Louisiana in the 20th century
- Ruby Cutter Savage (1876–1949), American soprano
- Ruby Dandridge (1900–1987), American actress
- Ruby Dee (1924–2014), American actress
- Ruby Dhalla (born 1974), Canadian politician
- Ruby Evans (born 2007), Welsh artistic gymnast
- Ruby Franke (born 1982), former American youtuber and convicted child abuser
- Ruby Nash Garnett (born 1939), lead singer of American group Ruby & the Romantics
- Ruby Gilbert (1929–2010), American politician
- Ruby I. Gilbert (1851–1945), American business woman
- Ruby Goldstein ("Ruby the Jewel of the Ghetto"; 1907–84), American welterweight boxer and referee
- Ruby Berkley Goodwin (1903–1961), American writer and actress
- Ruby Hunter (1955–2010), Australian singer-songwriter
- Ruby Ellen Huston (born 1938), New Zealand artist
- Ruby Keeler (1909–1993), American actress, singer and dancer
- Ruby Laffoon (1869–1941), 43rd Governor of Kentucky
- Ruby Lilley (born 2006), American skateboarder
- Ruby Lin (born 1976), Taiwanese actress
- Ruby McKim (1891–1976), English quilt designer, entrepreneur, and writer
- Ruby Modine (b. 1990), American actress and singer
- Ruby Murray (1935–1996), Northern Irish singer
- Ruby Myers (1907–1983), also known as Sulochana, Indian silent film actress
- Ruby O'Donnell (born 2000), English actress
- Ruby Payne-Scott (1912–1981), pioneering Australian astronomer
- Ruby Pouchet, Dutch beauty pageant titleholder from Bonaire
- Ruby Rose (born 1986), Australian MTV VJ
- Ruby Rose Turner (born 2005), American actress
- Ruby Riott (born 1991), ring name of American professional wrestler Dori Prange
- Ruby (born 1981), real name Rania Hussein Muhammad Tawfiq, Egyptian singer, actress and model
- Ruby Schleicher (born 1998), Australian rules footballer
- Ruby Svarc (born 1993), Australian rules footballer
- Ruby Turner (born 1958), British Jamaican singer, songwriter, and actress
- Ruby Walsh (born 1979), Irish jockey
- Ruby Wax (born 1953), British-American comedian
- Ruby Winters (1942–2016), American soul singer
- Ruby K. Worner (1900–1955), American chemist
- Ruby Yang, Chinese-American filmmaker

=== Fictional characters ===
- Ruby, Red's younger sister in Angry Birds who first appears in Angry Birds Friends in 2024
- Ruby, a rabbit villager in the video game series Animal Crossing
- Ruby, a character from the second season of Battle for Dream Island, an animated web series
- Ruby, a Cocotama who is the spirit of the ring in the anime Cocotama, Our Little Gods
- Ruby, a character in the 2022 film Disenchanted
- Ruby, a young mutant in The Hills Have Eyes and The Hills Have Eyes (2006 film)
- Ruby, a Japanese hare in the Jewelpet anime series
- Ruby, a Oviraptor character of The Land Before Time series
- Ruby, a character in the television series My Life with the Walter Boys
- Ruby, a wolf-blooded red riding hooded fighter in Mobile Legends
- Ruby, a (male) character in the Pokémon Adventures manga series
- Ruby (Steven Universe), a character in the animated television series Steven Universe
- Ruby, a demon character in the television series Supernatural
- Ruby, one of the identical twins in the Jacqueline Wilson novel Double Act
- Ruby (Jewelpet)
- Ruby, an According to Jim character
- Ruby, a promotional character created by ATI Technologies
- Ruby, the protagonist of the radio drama Ruby the Galactic Gumshoe
- Ruby, a potato in the British animated series Small Potatoes
- Ruby, an anthro mouse in the British children's series Big & Small
- Ruby, a character portrayed by Amrita Singh in the 1985 Indian film Mard
- Ruby, a character portrayed by Kareena Kapoor in the 2012 Indian film Agent Vinod
- Ruby Allen, a character in the British soap opera EastEnders, played by Louisa Lytton
- Ruby Baptiste, a character in the HBO television series Lovecraft Country
- Ruby Bennett, "Rue", the main character in HBO series Euphoria
- Ruby Bunny, an anthropomorphic rabbit and a main character in the children's book series Max & Ruby by Rosemary Wells and the animated preschool series Max & Ruby
- Ruby Buckton, Home and Away character played by Rebecca Breeds
- Ruby Crescent, a character of the 666 Satan manga
- Ruby Dennis, the protagonist of the film Dear Mr. Wonderful
- Ruby Dobbs, a character in the British soap opera Coronation Street
- Ruby Fox-Miligan, a character in the British soap opera Emmerdale
- Ruby Gallagher, a character of the ABC Family TV series Ruby & The Rockits
- Ruby Gillis, a character of Anne of Green Gables
- Ruby Gillman, the title character in the animated DreamWorks Animation film Ruby Gillman
- Ruby Gloom, the title character of the Canadian animated television series of the same name
- Ruby Hale, a recurring character in MARVEL's Agents of S.H.I.E.L.D. played by Dove Cameron
- Ruby Heart, original character in Marvel vs. Capcom 2
- Ruby Hoshino, the female protagonist in manga and anime series Oshi no Ko
- Ruby Kurosawa, a character from the media-mix project Love Live! Sunshine!!
- Ruby Lucas, a character from the ABC show Once Upon a Time
- Ruby Marshall, a character from the preschool TV series Dot.
- Ruby Moon, a character in Cardcaptor Sakura manga and anime
- Ruby Ramirez, a character from Treehouse's Rusty Rivets
- Ruby Rhod, a character (played by Chris Tucker) in the 1997 film The Fifth Element
- Ruby Rose, the main protagonist of the anime webseries RWBY
- Ruby Roundhouse, a main character in the films Jumanji: Welcome to the Jungle and Jumanji: The Next Level
- Ruby Snarkis, a character in the French Canadian series, Flying Rhino Junior High
- Ruby Spark, a character from the British medical drama Casualty
- Ruby Summers, the daughter of Scott Summers and Emma Frost in Marvel Comics
- Ruby Sunday, a character in British science fiction series Doctor Who
- Ruby Thewes, a character in the novel Cold Mountain by Charles Frazier and the film adaptation
- Ruby Trollman, a Trollz character

== See also ==
- Rubby, a masculine given name
