= Senate House =

Senate House may refer to:

- The building housing a legislative senate
  - List of legislative buildings
  - Senate House State Historic Site, in Kingston, New York, where the state's first Constitution was ratified in 1777.
- The building (formerly) housing an academic senate
  - Senate House, London of the University of London
    - Senate House Libraries, based in the building
  - Senate House, Cambridge of the University of Cambridge
  - Senate House (University of Madras)
