= Savages =

Savages may refer to:

== Films ==
- Savages (1972 film), by James Ivory
- Savages (1974 film), an American TV film
- Savages (2012 film), by Oliver Stone
- Savages (2024 film), a Swiss-French-Belgian stop motion animated film

== Television ==
=== Episodes ===
- "Savages" (Avengers Assemble) (2014)
- "Savages" (Blue) (2015)
- "Savages" (Law & Order) (1995)
- "Savages" (Outlander) (2018)

== Music ==
- Savages (band), a British post-punk band formed in 2011
- Savages (The Webb Sisters album), 2011
- Savages (Soulfly album), 2013
- Savages (Breathe Carolina album), 2014
- Savages (Glamour of the Kill album)
- Savages (Theory of a Deadman album), 2014
  - Savages (Theory of a Deadman song), from the album of the same name
- "Savages" (Pocahontas song), song from 1995 film Pocohontas
- "Savages", a song by Marina and the Diamonds from Froot

== Literature ==
- Savages, a 1921 novel by Gordon Young
- Savages, a 1983 novel by Robert Vaughan
- Savages, a 1986 novel by Shirley Conran
- Savages, a 2000 novel by David L. Robbins under the pseudonym David Thompson, the 30th installment in the Wilderness series
- Savages, a 2007 novel by Bill Pronzini, the 34th installment in the Nameless Detective series
- Savages (novel), a 2010 novel by Don Winslow
- Savages, a 2015 novel by Tom Holt under the pseudonym K. J. Parker
- Savages, a 2016 novel by Greg F. Gifune

== Other uses ==
- Les Sauvages ("The Savages"), Act IV of Jean-Philippe Rameau's opéra-ballet Les Indes galantes
- Savages (play), a 1973 play by Christopher Hampton
- Savages (company), a builder of Airco DH.6 airplanes during World War I

== See also ==
- Savage (disambiguation)
- The Savages (disambiguation)
- Barrence Whitfield & the Savages, a Boston-area R&B band
