= Pat Savage (disambiguation) =

Pat Savage is a footballer.

Pat Savage may also refer to:

- Pat Savage (rugby league)
- Pat Savage (Doc Savage character)

== See also ==
- Patrick Savage (disambiguation)
