= Patrick Savage =

Patrick Savage may refer to:

- Patrick Savage (judge)
- Patrick Savage (rugby league)
- Patrick Savage (composer)
- Patrick Savage (footballer)

== See also ==
- Pat Savage (disambiguation)
