= Sauvage =

Sauvage (French, 'savage') may refer to:

== Arts and entertainment ==
- Sauvage (film), a 2018 French film
- Le Sauvage, French title of Lovers Like Us, a 1975 French film
- Les sauvages, a section of Les Indes galantes, an opera-ballet by Jean-Philippe Rameau
- "Sauvage", a song by Billy Woods from the 2022 album Aethiopes

== Other uses ==
- Sauvage (surname), including a list of people with the name
- Sauvage River (disambiguation), several uses
- Les Sauvages, a commune in the Rhône department, France

== See also ==
- Savage (disambiguation)
- Planète Sauvage, a French zoological park
