= Phil Rosenthal (columnist) =

American journalist

- Born: July 14, 1963 (age 62); Chicago, Illinois
- Occupation: Columnist
- Spouse: Jennie Zbikowski

Phil Rosenthal (born July 14, 1963) is a general and sports media columnist, formerly of the Chicago Tribune. He joined the newspaper in early 2005 as a business writer, authoring the "Tower Ticker" column, and was promoted in June 2011, before taking a buyout in June 2021 after Tribune Publishing was bought out by Alden Global Capital. He had previously worked for the Chicago Sun-Times, Los Angeles Daily News, The Capital Times of Madison, Wisconsin, and the News Sun of Waukegan, Illinois.

== Biography ==
Rosenthal was born in Chicago and grew up in Lake Bluff, Illinois. He is a graduate of Lake Forest High School and the University of Wisconsin–Madison. He has been chairman of the UW-Madison School of Journalism and Mass Communication's Board of Visitors.

Lake Bluff's Rosenthal Field is named for Rosenthal's late father, a former youth baseball coach and elementary school board member. Rosenthal's mother was once Lake Bluff's village clerk and served on the local high school board.

Rosenthal is married to the former Jennie Zbikowski, half-sister of former pro football player Tom Zbikowski.
