= William Savage (academic) =

English academic (died 1736)

William Savage (died 1736) was an English academic.

He was born in Ickleford and entered Emmanuel College, Cambridge in 1686, graduating B.A in 1690, M.A. in 1693, and D.D. in 1717. He was Fellow of Emmanuel from 1692 to 1702; and Rector of St Andrew-by-the-Wardrobe from 1703. He also held the livings of Gravesend and Stone, Kent. He was Master of Emmanuel from 1719 until his death in 1736. He was Vice-Chancellor of the University of Cambridge from 1724 to 1725. He was probably a relation of the writer John Savage.
