= The Savage =

The Savage may refer to:

- The Savage (1917 film), silent drama
- The Savage (1926 film), silent romantic comedy
- The Savage (1952 film), Technicolor Western
- The Savage (novel), 2008 graphic novel by David Almond
- "The Savage" (song), instrumental track by British group The Shadows

== See also ==
- Savage (disambiguation)
- The Savages (disambiguation)
- The Savage Nation, American conservative talk radio show
