= Paul Sauvage =

Paul Sauvage may refer to:

- Paul Sauvage (footballer) (1939–2020), French footballer
- Paul Sauvage (aviator) (1897–1917), French World War I flying ace

== See also ==
- Paul Savage (disambiguation)
