= Savage =

Savage may refer to:

- Savage (pejorative term), a derogatory term to describe a member of a people the speaker regards as primitive and uncivilized

== Arts and entertainment ==
=== Fictional characters ===
- Bill Savage, in the 2000 AD Invasion! stories
- Savage/Noble, in the Transformers fictional universe
- Savage Henry, in Savage Henry comics
- Sgt. Savage and his Screaming Eagles, a line of military-themed toys

=== Film ===
- Savage (1973 TV film), directed by Steven Spielberg
- Savage! (1973 theatrical film), an American-Philippines action film
- Savage (1996 film), A science-fiction thriller directed by Avi Nesher
- Savage (2009 film), a Canadian short film
- Savage (2009 Irish film), by Brendan Muldowney

=== Gaming ===
- Savage (video game), 1988
- Savage: The Battle for Newerth, a 2003 computer game
- Savage: The Ultimate Quest for Survival, 1996 educational video game

=== Literature ===
- Savage (novel), a 1993 novel by Richard Laymon
- Savage, a sequel series to the comic series Invasion! (2000 AD)

=== Music ===
==== Performers ====
- Savage (band), a British heavy metal band
- Savage (musician), Roberto Zanetti (born 1956)
- Savage (rapper), Demetrius C. Savelio (born 1981)

==== Albums ====
- Savage (Eurythmics album), and the title song, 1987
  - Savage (video), 1988
- Savage (Tank album), and the title song, 2017
- Savage (Songs from a Broken World), by Gary Numan, 2017
- Savage, by Taichi Mukai, and the title song, 2019
- Savage!!!, by Teengenerate, 1996
- Savage, by Trust, 1982
- Savage (EP), by Aespa, 2021

==== Songs ====
- "Savage" (Megan Thee Stallion song), 2020
- "Savage" (Aespa song), 2021
- "Savage", by Bahari, 2018
- "Savage", by A Boogie wit da Hoodie from Hoodie SZN, 2018
- "Savage", by Demon Hunter from Outlive, 2017
- "Savage", by Judas Priest from Stained Class, 1978
- "Savage", by Lights from Skin & Earth, 2017
- "Savage", by Northlane from Mesmer, 2017
- "Savage", by Whethan, 2016

== Military ==
- HMS Savage, the name of several Royal Navy ships
- USS Savage, a U.S. destroyer escort launched in 1943
- North American AJ Savage, a U.S. Navy carrier-based bomber
- RT-2, a Soviet intercontinental ballistic missile, NATO reporting name SS-13 Savage
- Caucasian Native Cavalry Division or Savage Division, formed in 1914
- Camp Savage, an American Military Intelligence Service language school during World War II

== People ==
- Savage (surname), a list of people with the surname
- Michael Joseph Savage (1872–1940), 23rd Prime Minister of New Zealand
- Savage Steve Holland (born 1960), American animator and film director
- Savage Mostyn (c. 1713–1757), British admiral and Member of Parliament
- Jimmy Savage (1910–1951), or Savage, American journalist
- Alan Savage, a pen name of Christopher Nicole (1930–2017), British fiction and non-fiction writer
- Martin Foss Andersen (born 2004), professional Fortnite player better known as MrSavage or simply Savage
- Savage family (or families) of the English and Irish gentry
- Viscount Savage, an extinct title in the Peerage of England

== Places ==
=== United States ===
- Savage, Maryland, an unincorporated community and census-designated place
- Savage, Minnesota, a city
- Savage, Mississippi, an unincorporated community
- Savage, Montana, an unincorporated community and census-designated place
- Savage Island (Alaska)
- Savage Island (Washington)
- Savage Lake, Minnesota
- Savage Mountain, in Pennsylvania and Maryland
- Savage River (Maryland), a tributary of the Potomac River

=== Outer space ===
- 29837 Savage, an asteroid
- Savage (crater), on Mercury

=== Elsewhere ===
- Savage Harbour, Prince Edward Island, Canada
- Savage Glacier, Ellsworth Land, Antarctica
- Savage Nunatak, Marie Byrd Land, Antarctica
- Savage River, Tasmania, Australia, a town
- Savage River (Tasmania), a tributary of the Pieman River
- Niue (formerly "Savage Island"), an island nation in the South Pacific Ocean
- Savage Islands, a small Portuguese archipelago in the North Atlantic Ocean off the Canary Islands

== Other uses ==
- Savage station, a railway station between Washington DC, and Baltimore, United States
- Savage Arena, Toledo, Ohio, United States
- Savage Arms, a firearm manufacturer
- Savage Entertainment, a former video game developer
- Savage Club, a gentlemen's club in London
- Savage Dam, San Diego County, California, United States
- Savage Stadium, on the campus of Oberlin College, Ohio, United States
- HPI Savage, a radio-controlled vehicle
- S3 Savage, a series of graphics chipsets
- Suzuki Boulevard S40, formerly LS650 Savage, a motorcycle

== See also ==
- Savages (disambiguation)
- Noble savage, a stock character and ethnic stereotype
- 21 Savage (Shayaa Bin Abraham-Joseph, born 1992), American rapper
- Savaged (2013 film), or Avenged, a horror thriller
- The Savage (disambiguation)
