= Thomas Forster (artist) =

English portrait draughtsman (1676/7–after 1712)

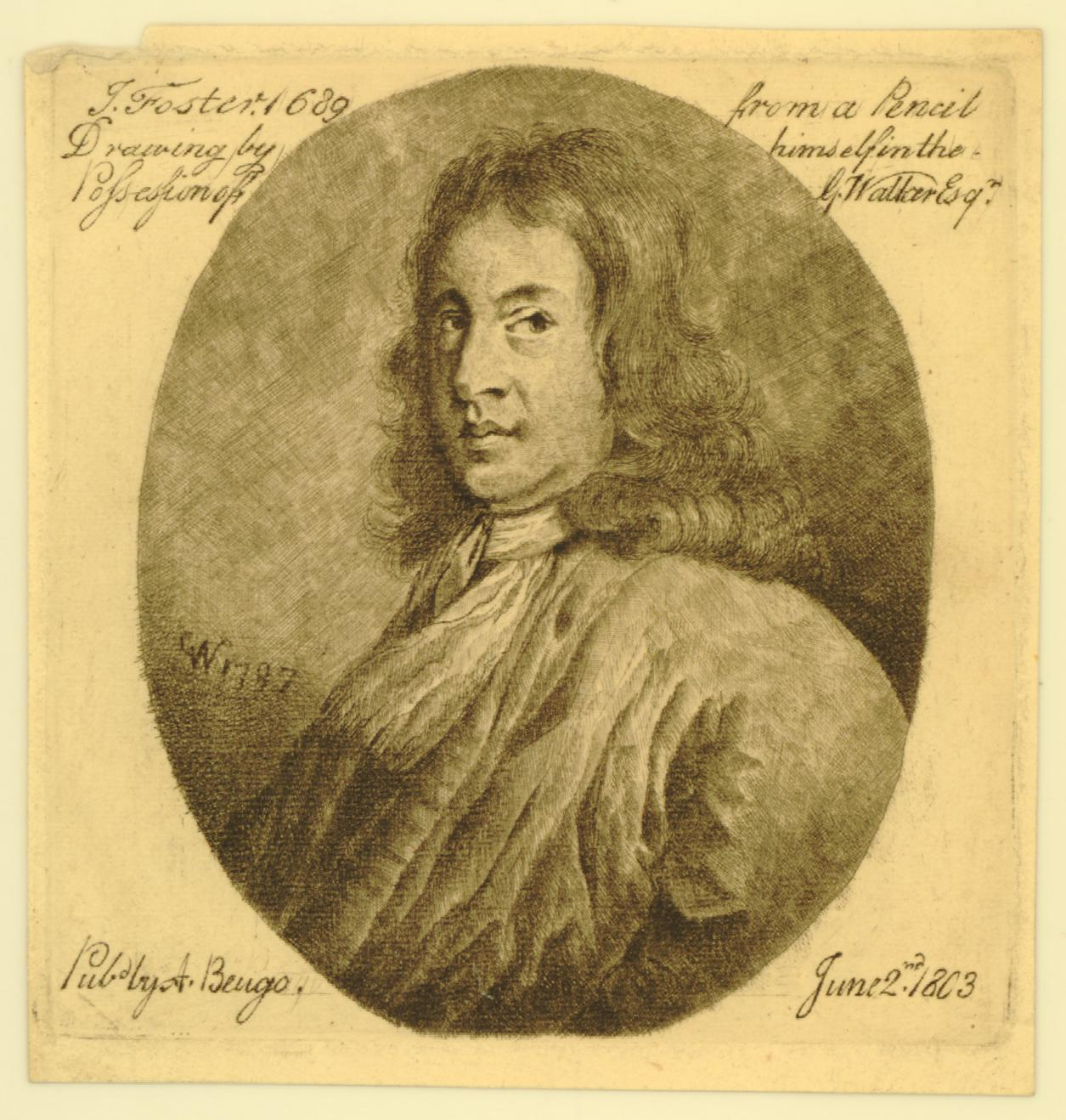
Engraving after a self-portrait (1797)

Thomas Forster (1676/7 – after 1712; fl. 1695–1712) was an English portrait draughtsman and miniaturist.

== Works ==
Forster is known from a number of small portraits in pencil on vellum, and according to Lionel Cust they are "drawn with exquisite care and feeling". The majority of these were no doubt intended for engraving as frontispieces to books, and the following were so engraved by Michael Vander Gucht and others: John Savage, Sir Thomas Littleton, the Speaker, William Lloyd, Bishop of St. Asaph, Humphry Hody, John Newte, and others.

Unlike David Loggan, Robert White, and John Faber Senior, who drew portraits "ad vivum" in the same style, Forster does not appear to have been an engraver himself. A number of his drawings were exhibited at the special Exhibition of Portrait Miniatures at the South Kensington Museum in 1865; they included Robert, Lord Lucas, Archbishop Ussher, Sir Thomas Pope Blount, Baronet, Lady Blount, John, Lord Somers, and Admiral Sir George Rooke. A drawing of Margaret Harcourt was acquired for the print room at the British Museum. His portraits are highly valued.

== Gallery ==
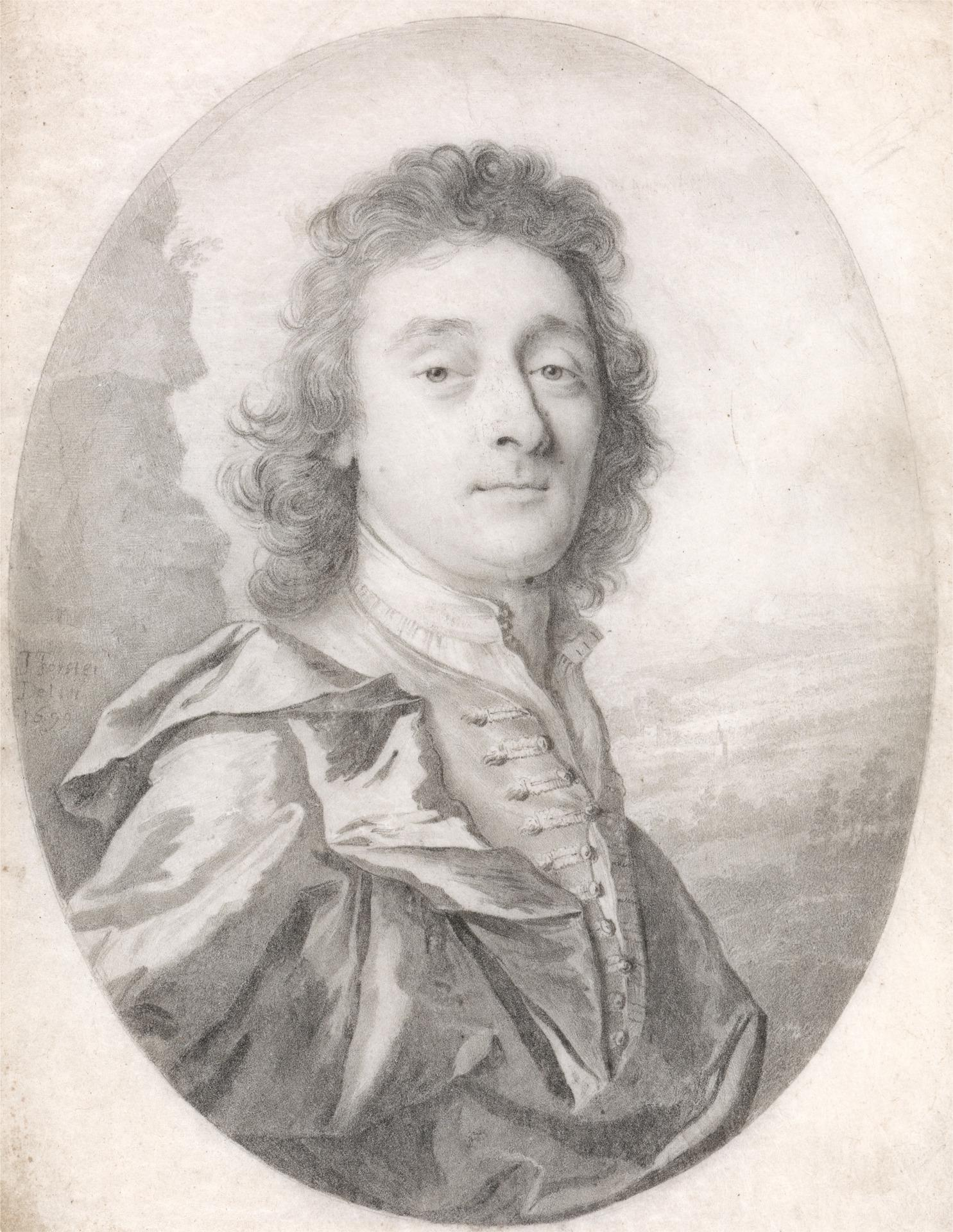
Portrait of a Man (1699)

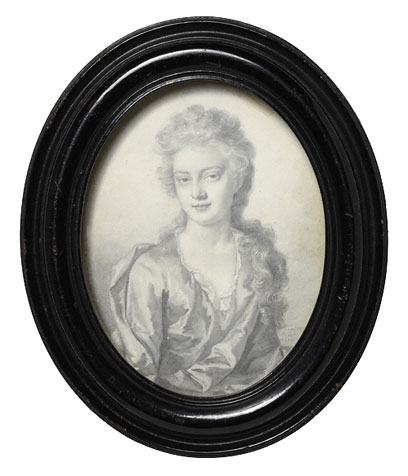
Portrait of Lady Anne Churchill (1700)

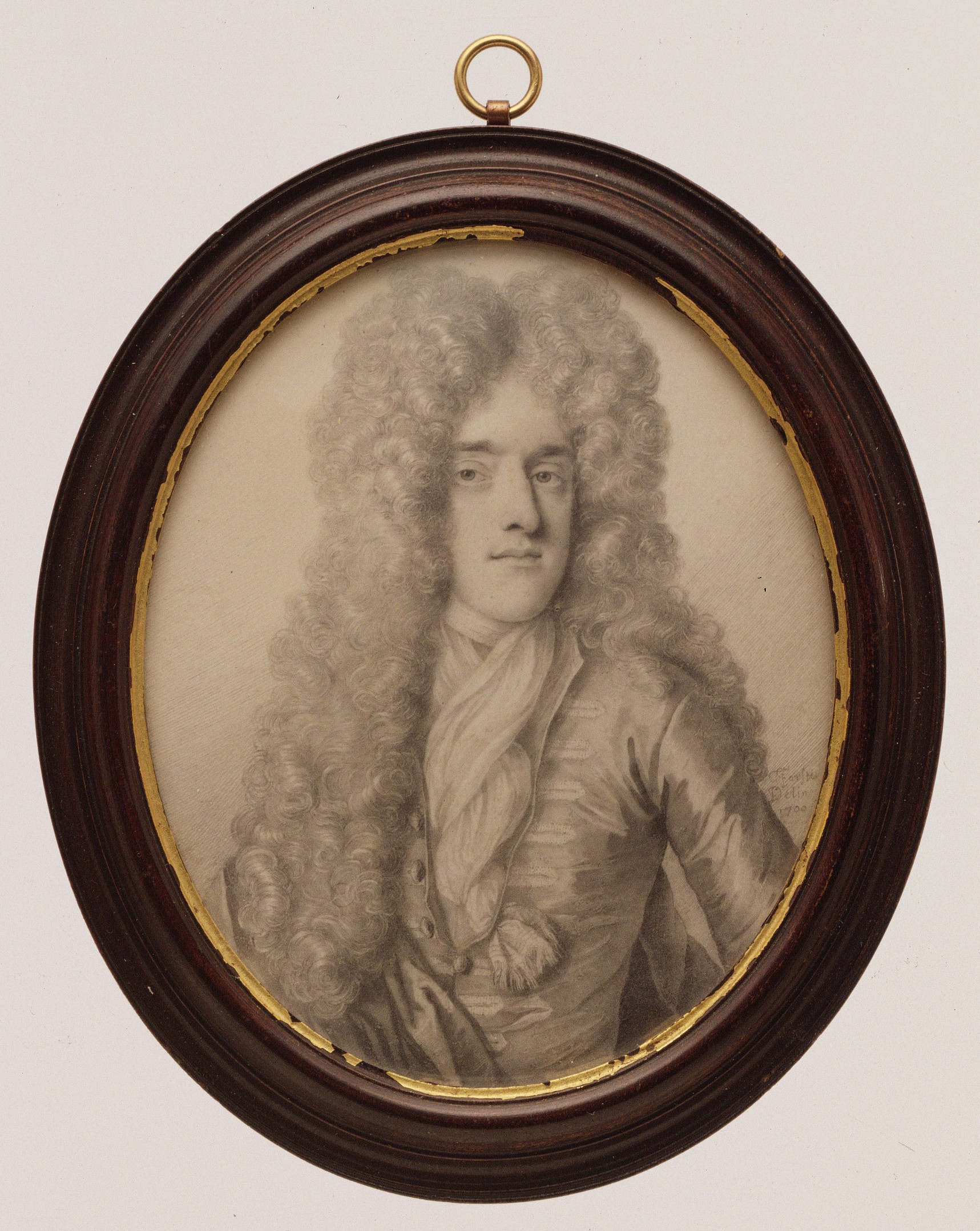
Portrait of a Man (1700)

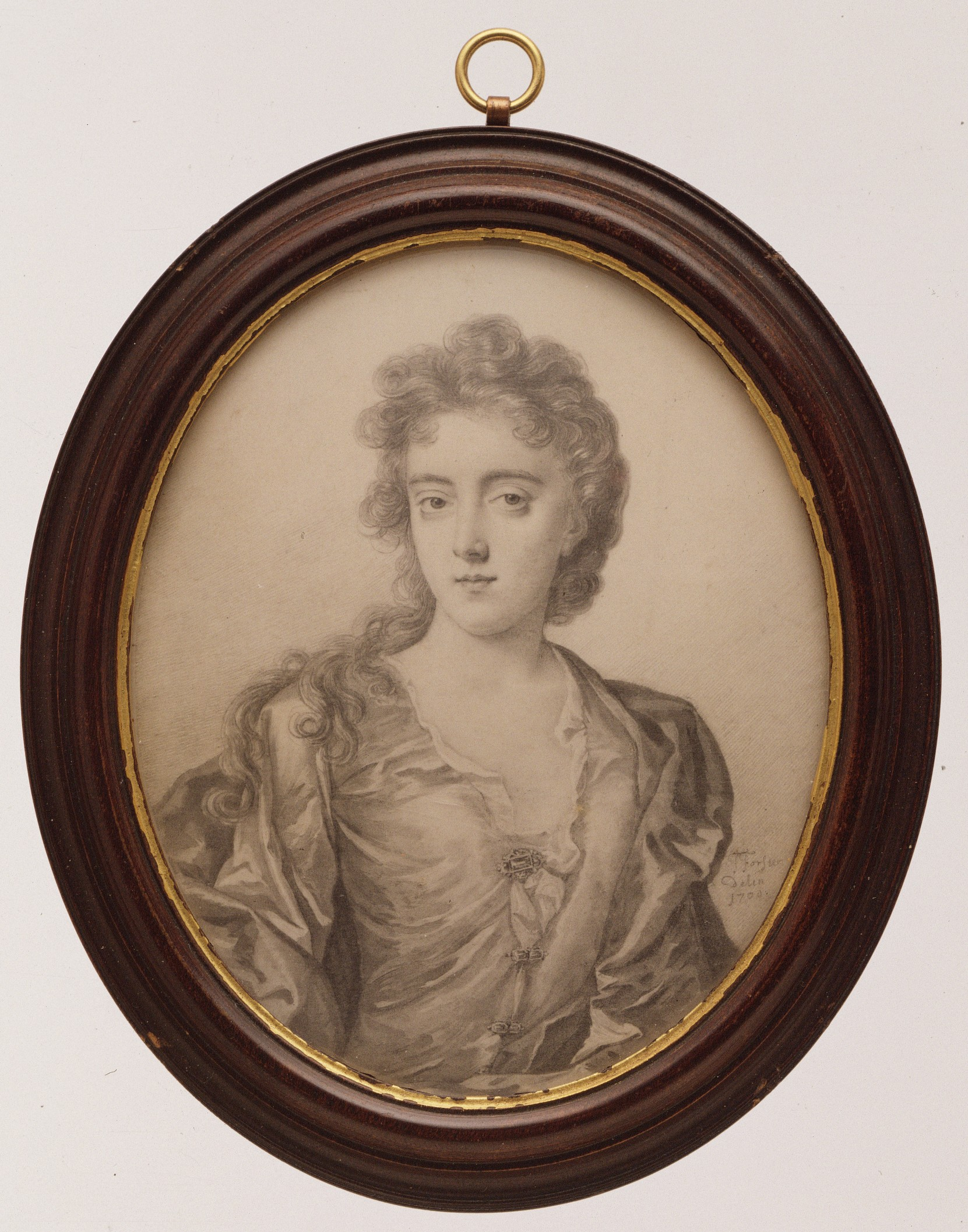
Portrait of a Woman (1700)

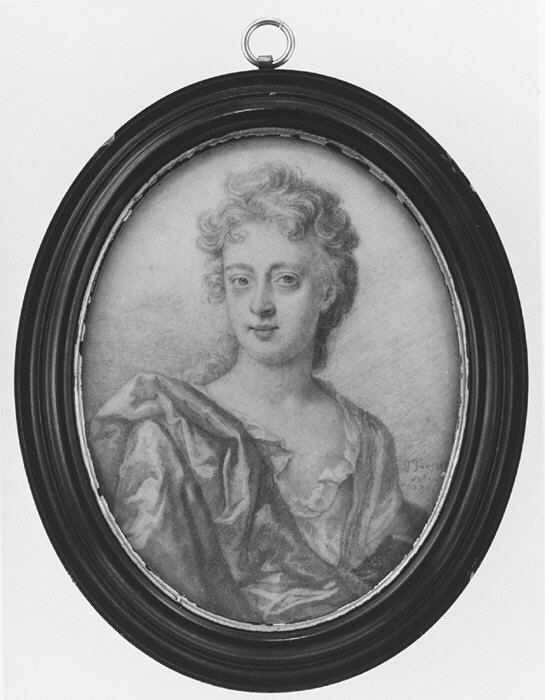
Portrait of a Woman (1701)

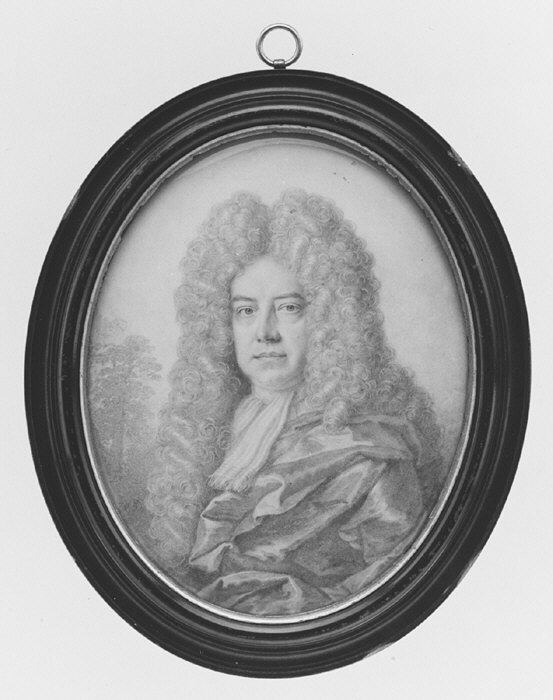
Portrait of a Man (1705)

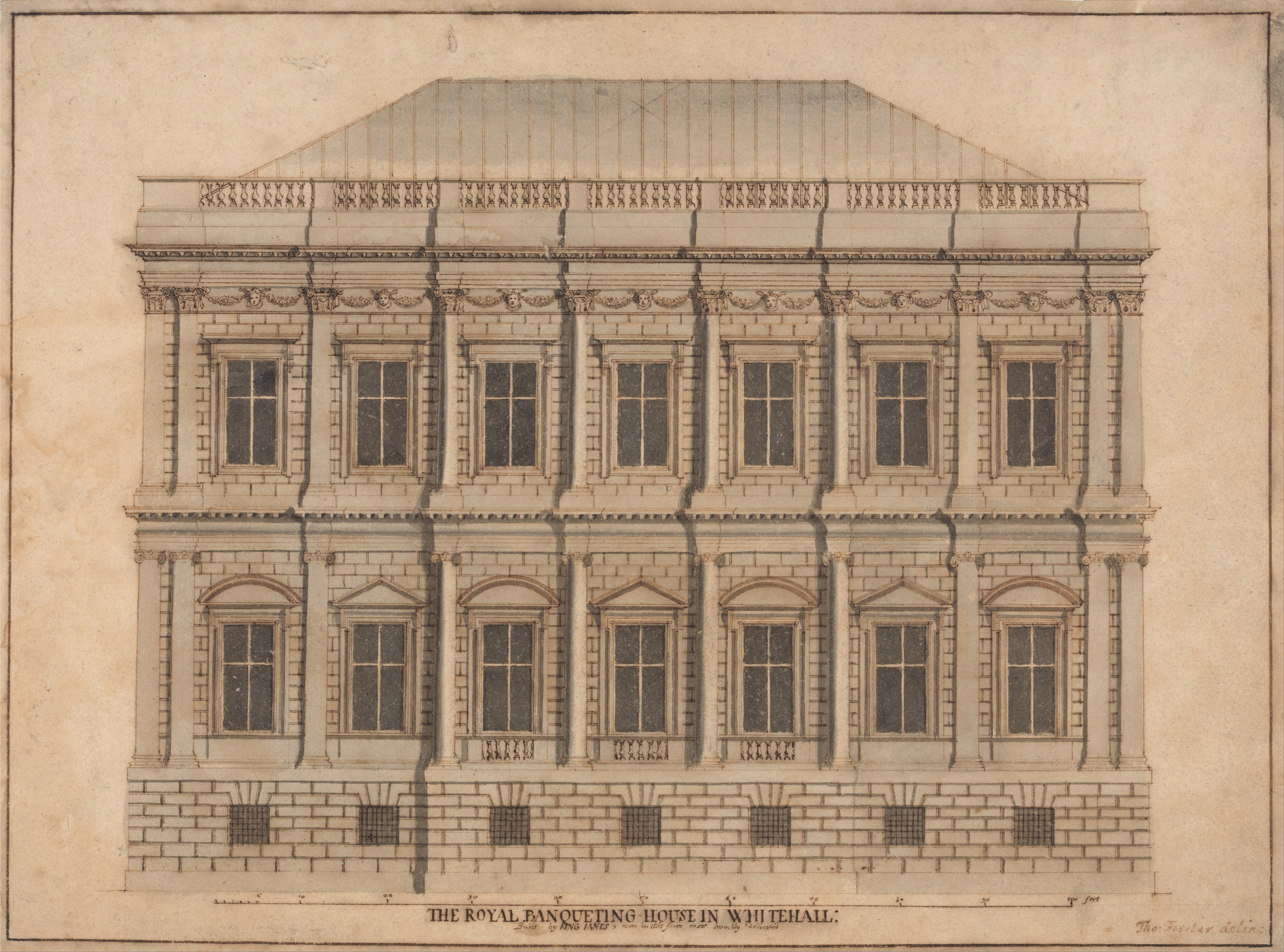
Banqueting House, Whitehall (undated)

== Sources ==
- Bromley, Henry (1793). A Catalogue of Engraved British Portraits. London: T. Payne; J. Edwards; W. Otridge and Son; R. Faulder. pp. 216, 220, 224, 226, 298.
- Brown, David Blayney (2003). "Forster, Thomas". Grove Art Online. Oxford University Press. Retrieved 17 September 2022.
- This article incorporates text from a publication now in the public domain: Cust, Lionel Henry (1889). "Forster, Thomas (fl.1695-1712)". In Stephen, Leslie (ed.). Dictionary of National Biography. Vol. 20. London: Smith, Elder & Co. p. 21.
- Coombs, Katherine (2004). "Forster, Thomas (b. 1676/7), portrait draughtsman". Oxford Dictionary of National Biography. Oxford University Press. Retrieved 17 September 2022.
- Oliver, Valerie Cassel, ed. (2011). "Forster, Thomas". Benezit Dictionary of Artists. Oxford University Press. Retrieved 17 September 2022.
- Redgrave, Samuel (1878). "Forster, Thomas". A Dictionary of Artists of the English School. New ed. London: George Bell and Sons. p. 158.
- Catalogue of the Special Exhibition of Portrait Miniatures on Loan at the South Kensington Museum, June 1865. London: Whittingham and Wilkins, 1865. pp. v, ix, 14, 102, 103, 105, 126, 207, 229, 239, 266, 267, 268, 272, 274, 291.
- "Thomas Forster". National Portrait Gallery. Retrieved 17 September 2022.
- "Thomas Forster". The British Museum. Retrieved 17 September 2022.
