= William Watkins (footballer) =

English footballer

Personal information
- Full name: William Watkins
- Place of birth: England
- Position: Inside forward

Senior career*
Years	Team	Apps	(Gls)
18xx–1898	Trawden	?	(?)
1898–1902	Burnley	42	(7)
1902–19xx	Trawden Forest	?	(?)
- * Club domestic league appearances and goals

William Watkins was an English professional footballer who played as an inside forward. He played 42 games and scored seven goals in the Football League for Burnley between 1898 and 1902.
