= Sauvage (surname) =

Sauvage is a French surname. Notable people with the surname include:

- Alexis Sauvage (born 1991), French footballer
- Catherine Sauvage (1929–1998), French singer and actress
- Cécile Sauvage (1883–1927), French poet
- Claude Sauvage (1936–2011), French racing cyclist
- Cyrille Sauvage (born 1973), French racing driver
- David Sauvage, filmmaker and self-described empath
- Denis Sauvage (1520–1587), French translator and historian
- Élie Sauvage (1814–1871), French playwright and novelist
- Etienne de Sauvage (1789–1867), Belgian politician
- Fernand Sauvage (c. 1920), Belgian diver
- François Clément Sauvage (1814–1872), French geologist and mining engineer
- Frédéric Sauvage (1786–1857), French boat builder who carried out early tests of screw-type marine propellers
- Henri Sauvage (1873–1932), French architectural designer
- Henri Émile Sauvage (1842–1917), French paleontologist and ichthyologist
- James Sauvage (born James Savage, 1849–1922), Welsh baritone singer
- Jacqueline Sauvage (1947–2020), French murderer
- Jean Sauvage (1455–1518), chancellor of Holy Roman Emperor Charles V
- Jean-Pierre Sauvage (born 1944), French coordination chemist
- Julien Sauvage (born 1985), French professional swimmer
- Leo Sauvage, French journalist
- Louise Sauvage (born 1973), Australian paralympic wheelchair racer
- Marcel Sauvage (1895–1988), French journalist and writer
- Marguerite Sauvage, French illustrator and scriptwriter
- Pascal Sauvage, main antagonist of Johnny English (2001)
- Paul Sauvage (footballer) (1939–2019), French footballer
- Paul Sauvage (aviator) (1897–1917), French World War I flying ace
- Piat Joseph Sauvage (1744–1818), Belgian painter
- Pierre Sauvage (born c. 1948)
- Thomas Sauvage (1794–1877), French dramatist and theatre director
