= Savige =

Savige is a surname. Notable people with the surname include:

- Jaya Savige (born 1978), Australian poet and critic
- John Russell Savige (1908–1977), Australian soldier
- Stanley Savige (1890–1954), Australian soldier

== See also ==
- Savage (disambiguation)
- Savidge (disambiguation)
