= Sauvage River =

Sauvage River may refer to:

- Sauvage River (Felton River tributary), Quebec, Canada
- Sauvage River (Gentilly River tributary), Quebec, Canada

== See also ==
- Sauvage (disambiguation)
