= Angel (Theory of a Deadman song) =

Single by Theory of a Deadman

from the album Savages
- Released: February 24, 2015
- Genre: Alternative rock
- Length: 3:22
- Label: Roadrunner; 604
- Composers: Tyler Connolly; Dave Brenner; Dean Back; Joey Dandeneau
- Lyricists: Tyler Connolly; Dave Brenner; Dean Back; Joey Dandeneau; Jennifer Decilveo
- Producer: Howard Benson

Theory of a Deadman singles chronology
"Savages" (2014)	"Angel" (2015)	"Blow" (2015)

Music video
- "Angel" on YouTube

Angel is the third single on the Canadian rock band Theory of a Deadman's fifth studio album Savages. The single was released on February 24, 2015.

== Composition ==
"Angel" is a ballad about a man who's in love with an angel but realizes that he eventually has to let her go. Randy Shatkowski of Underground Pulse describes the song as an "electronic-tinged lost love ballad" and noted Tyler Connolly's vocals to be his most vulnerable yet.

== Charts ==
=== Weekly charts ===
Weekly chart performance for "Angel"
Chart (2015)	Peak position
Canada Rock (Billboard)	33
US Hot Rock & Alternative Songs (Billboard)	29
US Rock & Alternative Airplay (Billboard)	18

=== Year-end charts ===
Year-end chart performance for "Angel"
Chart (2015)	Position
US Hot Rock Songs (Billboard)	71

== Certifications ==
Certifications for "Angel"
Region	Certification	Certified units/sales
Canada (Music Canada)	Platinum	80,000^{‡}
United States (RIAA)	Platinum	1,000,000^{‡}
^{‡} Sales+streaming figures based on certification alone.
