= Trawden Forest F.C. =

English football club

Trawden Forest/Colne Football Club
- Full name: Trawden Forest/Colne
- Founded: 1892
- Dissolved: 1913
- Ground: Alkincoates
Home colours

Trawden Forest Football Club was an English association football club based in the village of Trawden in Lancashire and playing their matches at Cottontree, Colne.

== History ==
The club was founded in December 1892. It entered the FA Cup, the major English cup competition, for the first time in the 1897–98 season and reached the first qualifying round before being knocked out by Stalybridge Rovers. In the following season, Trawden Forest enjoyed their best run in the FA Cup, reaching the second qualifying round before losing away at Southport Central. In 1899–1900, they were knocked out in the preliminary round by Nelson. Trawden Forest never won another match in the FA Cup, and their heaviest defeat in the competition came on 21 September 1901, when they were beaten 0–7 away at Oswaldtwistle Rovers.

For the 1902–03 season, the team joined the Lancashire Combination, which was the highest level of non-league football in the area. Trawden Forest finished 14th out of 18 teams. A record of 9 wins, 8 draws and 17 defeats gave the team a total of 26 points from 34 matches. In the same season, the team entered the preliminary round and held Bacup to a 3–3 draw before losing the replay three days later.

In July 1903, Trawden Forest FC changed its name to Colne FC. Under that name, the club continued to play in the Lancashire Combination until 1913 when it folded.

== Colours ==
The club originally wore blue and white striped shirts, which it changed in 1905 to green jerseys.

== Ground ==
The club played at Alkincoates, in the north-west of Colne, and to the south of the current Alkincoates Park, roughly encompassed by Priestfield Avenue.

== Notable players ==
Several footballers began their careers at Trawden Forest before moving into professional football; Arthur Dixon went on to play professionally with Burnley, Tottenham Hotspur and Bradford Park Avenue, while William Nunnick represented Burnley in the Football League. Others ended their career at the club having retired from the professional game; James Savage, William Watkins and Alfred Sawley all played for Trawden Forest after leaving Burnley.

== FA Cup results ==
Season	Date	Round	Opponents	H/A	Result
1897–98	18 September 1897	Preliminary Round	South Shore	Home	4–3
1897–98	25 September 1897	First qualifying round	Stalybridge Rovers	Away	0–3
1898–99	24 September 1898	Preliminary Round	Carlisle City	Away	3–2
1898–99	1 October 1898	First qualifying round	Black Diamonds	Away	3–1
1898–99	15 October 1898	Second qualifying round	Southport Central	Away	2–3
1899–1900	23 September 1899	Preliminary Round	Nelson	Away	1–2
1900–01	6 October 1900	First qualifying round	Blackburn Park Road	Away	1–5
1901–02	21 September 1901	Preliminary Round	Oswaldtwistle Rovers	Away	0–7
1902–03	20 September 1902	Preliminary Round	Bacup	Home	3–3
1902–03	23 September 1902	Preliminary Round (replay)	Bacup	Away	3–4
