= Elizabeth Savage =

Elizabeth Savage may refer to:

- Elizabeth Savage, Countess Rivers (1581–1650), English courtier
- Elizabeth Savage (historian), art historian
- Elizabeth Savage (writer) (1918–1989), American novelist and short-story writer
