= Alfred Sawley =

English footballer

Personal information
- Position: Inside forward

Senior career*
Years	Team	Apps	(Gls)
1900–1903	Burnley	13	(1)
1903–19xx	Trawden Forest	?	(?)
- * Club domestic league appearances and goals

Alfred Sawley was an English professional footballer who played as an inside forward. He played 13 matches and scored one goal in the Football League for Burnley.
