= The Savages =

The Savages may refer to:

- The Savages (film), a 2007 film by Tamara Jenkins
- "The Savages" (Have Gun – Will Travel) (1963)
- The Savages (Doctor Who), a 1966 serial of the British science fiction series Doctor Who
- The Savages (TV series), a British sitcom that aired in 2001
- The Savages (Screaming Lord Sutch backing band), a British rock band, formed 1960
- The Savages (Bermuda band), a Bermudian garage rock band active in the mid-1960s
- The Savages (Indian band), an Indian rock band active in the 60s and 70s.
- The Savages, a 1986 novelization of the 1966 Doctor Who serial by Ian Stuart Black
- The Savages, a 2013 novel by Matt Whyman

== See also ==
- Savages (disambiguation)
- The Savage (disambiguation)
