= Drown (Theory of a Deadman song) =

Single by Theory of a Deadman

from the album Savages
- Released: April 22, 2014
- Genre: Hard rock
- Length: 3:41
- Label: Roadrunner; 604
- Songwriters: Tyler Connolly; Dave Brenner; Dean Back
- Producer: Howard Benson

Theory of a Deadman singles chronology
"Gentleman" (2012)	"Drown" (2014)	"Savages" (2014)

Music video
- "Drown" on YouTube

Drown is the lead single on the Canadian rock band Theory of a Deadman's fifth studio album Savages. The single was released on April 22, 2014.

== Composition ==
"Drown" is notably darker lyrically and in sound than most of the band's songs. Vocalist Tyler Connolly explains the song is about being alone and letting yourself be defeated or "washed away" rather than making the difficult stand to "rise to the surface." The song is written in drop C tuning, and was noted by the Ultimate Guitar Team for its heavy bass riff. Randy Shatkowski of Underground Pulse compared the instrumentation of "Drown" to Alice in Chains and also noted Connolly's vocals to be slightly similar to that of Avenged Sevenfold's M. Shadows.

== Chart positions ==
Chart (2014)	Peak position
Canada Rock (Billboard)	7
US Hot Rock & Alternative Songs (Billboard)	43
US Rock & Alternative Airplay (Billboard)	27
