= Savidge =

Savidge may refer to:

== People ==
- Cecil Savidge (1905–1975), Chief Commissioner of Balochistan
- Clark V. Savidge (1870–1947), Washington State Commissioner of Public Lands
- Don Savidge (1908–1983), American baseball player
- Frederick William Savidge (1862–1935), English missionary
- Irene Savidge (1905–1985), British factory worker
- Jane Savidge, British writer and public relations agent
- Jennifer Savidge, American actress
- John Savidge (1924–1979), British track and field athlete
- Malcolm Savidge (born 1946), British politician
- Martin Savidge (born 1958), American television journalist
- Ralph Savidge (1879–1959), American baseball player
- S. Leigh Savidge, American screenwriter
- William Savidge (1863–1916), American politician
- William Brandreth Savidge (1866–1939), English architect
- Vaughan Savidge (born 1956), English BBC newsreader

== Other uses ==
- Savidge Lake, a lake in Minnesota, United States

== See also ==
- Savage (disambiguation)
- Savige (disambiguation)
- George Salvidge (1919–1941), English footballer
