= Elizabeth Savage (historian) =

British-American-German art historian and bibliographer

Elizabeth Savage FSA, FRHistS, FHEA
- Born: Lauren Elizabeth Upper; United States
- Occupations: Art historian, bibliographer, curator, printer
- Known for: History of colour printing in the West, 1400–1830
- Awards: British Academy Postdoctoral Fellowship (2015); Wolfgang Ratjen Prize (2016); Schulman and Bullard Article Prize (2020); APHA Individual Laureate (2026)

Academic background
- Education: Boston University (BA, 2003); Courtauld Institute of Art (MA, 2005); King's College, Cambridge (PhD, 2013)
- Doctoral advisor: Jean Michel Massing
- Other advisor: Joseph Koerner

Academic work
- Discipline: Art history, bibliography, history of printing
- Institutions: School of Advanced Study, University of London; Senate House Libraries
- Website: orcid.org/0000-0002-7274-2471

Lauren Elizabeth Savage (née Upper) FSA, FRHistS, FHEA is a British, American, and German art historian, bibliographer, curator, and printer specialising in western late medieval and early modern printing practices. She is a leading authority on how information was printed between 1400 and 1600, especially in Europe and especially in colour.

As of 2026, she serves at the School of Advanced Study, University of London, as Senior Lecturer in Book History and Communications, Head of Academic Research Engagement at Senate House Libraries, and has taught at the London Rare Books School.

== Education ==
A National Merit Scholar, Savage took a BA in Art History and Literature from the University Professors Program, Boston University, where she studied with Saul Bellow, Geoffrey Hill, and Rosanna Warren, in 2003. Following a certificate in French Language and Culture from the Sorbonne, she took an MA in History of Art at the Courtauld Institute of Art, supervised by Joseph Koerner, in 2005. After working at the Warburg Institute, she completed a PhD at King's College, Cambridge, supervised by Jean Michel Massing, in 2013, with a thesis on colour printing in the age of Dürer and chiaroscuro woodcuts of the German-speaking lands from 1487 to around 1600.

Her teaching, research, and engagement activities are also informed by her earlier professional background in exhibitions of contemporary art and design, for which she lectured on curation for the MA Photographic Studies at the University of Westminster from 2006 to 2013.

== Career ==
=== Early postdoctoral work (2013–2016) ===
While completing her PhD, Savage was a keyholder to the rare book vaults at Cambridge University Library as Munby Fellow in Bibliography. As a postdoc, her work at the John Rylands Research Institute and Library, University of Manchester, was highlighted in the journal Nature in 2015. She then held a British Academy Postdoctoral Fellowship in the Faculty of English, Cambridge University, with a Postdoctoral By-fellowship at Churchill College, Cambridge.

During her British Academy fellowship, Savage curated the exhibition Early Modern German Colour Woodcuts at the British Museum in 2015, bringing together the earliest surviving attempts at colour printing in the west for the first time in a public exhibition.

She had held honorary affiliations at the Warburg Institute (2013–2014) and at History of Art, Cambridge University (2013–2018).

=== School of Advanced Study (2016–present) ===
In 2016, Savage joined the School of Advanced Study, University of London, described by the university as the UK's national centre for the promotion and facilitation of research in the humanities. She is currently Senior Lecturer in Book History and Communications, Head of Academic Research Engagement at Senate House Libraries, and module leader for the London Rare Books School. Since 2020, she has held an honorary affiliation at the Centre for the Study of the Book, Bodleian Libraries, University of Oxford. From 2022 to 2023, she was a Fellow at the Linda Hall Library in Kansas City.

From 2025 to 2028, she serves as Joint Reviews Editor of the Journal of the Printing Historical Society and as advisory board member of the Papers of the Bibliographical Society of America. She serves as a mentor for Science for Ukraine and for Historians of Netherlandish Art.

== Research ==
=== Colour printing in the pre-industrial West ===
Savage's research centres on how information was printed in the pre-industrial west, particularly 1400–1600 and especially in colour. Her approach combines material evidence — close examination of surviving printed objects — with recreations at historically appropriate printing presses, in order to identify the materials and techniques used by early printers.

Her 2014 article "Red Frisket Sheets, ca. 1490–1700: The Earliest Artifacts of Color Printing in the West," published in the Papers of the Bibliographical Society of America, identified frisket sheets — used during the letterpress printing process to mask areas of paper — as the earliest surviving physical artefacts of colour printing in the western tradition. The article won the New Scholar Award from the Bibliographical Society of America in 2014.

Her 2019 article "Identifying Hans Baldung Grien's Colour Printer, c.1511–12", published in the Burlington Magazine, identified the printer responsible for the colour woodcuts attributed to Hans Baldung Grien during the crucial early decades of colour printing in Germany. The article won the Schulman and Bullard Article Prize from the Association of Print Scholars in 2020.

=== Printing Colour Project (2009–2018) ===
Savage co-founded and directed the Printing Colour Project from 2009 to 2018. The project supported £600,000 in grant income and a series of blockbuster exhibitions that engaged 350,000 members of the public in the history of colour printing in the west.

== Exhibitions ==
Savage has curated and contributed to exhibitions at major library and museum collections across Europe and North America. She curated an exhibition at Cambridge University Library in 2013 and the exhibition of German Renaissance colour woodcuts at the British Museum in 2015, supported by the British Academy.

She contributed to exhibitions at Museum Kunstpalast Düsseldorf (2017), the Groeningemuseum, Bruges (2018), the Louvre, Paris (2019), and the Staatliche Kunsthalle Karlsruhe (2019).

== Publications ==
=== Books ===
- Early Colour Printing: German Renaissance Woodcuts at the British Museum (London: Paul Holberton Publishing, 2021). ISBN 978-1-911300-75-5
- Printing Colour 1700–1830: Histories, Techniques, Functions and Receptions, ed. with Margaret Morgan Grasselli. Proceedings of the British Academy, 263 (Oxford: Oxford University Press, 2025). ISBN 978-0-19-726753-0

=== Edited volumes ===
- Printing Colour 1400–1700: History, Techniques, Functions and Receptions, ed. with Ad Stijnman (Leiden: Brill, 2015). ISBN 978-90-04-29011-2
- Printing Things: Blocks, Plates, and Other Objects that Printed, 1400–1900, ed. with Femke Speelberg. Proceedings of the British Academy (Oxford: Oxford University Press, under contract).

=== Selected articles ===
- "Red Frisket Sheets, ca. 1490–1700: The Earliest Artifacts of Color Printing in the West," Papers of the Bibliographical Society of America 108/4 (December 2014): 477–522. doi:10.1086/681568
- "Identifying Hans Baldung Grien's Colour Printer, c.1511–12," Burlington Magazine 161 (October 2019): 830–839

== Awards and fellowships ==
Year	Award	Awarding body
2003	National Merit Scholar	National Merit Scholarship Corporation
2013	Munby Fellowship in Bibliography	Cambridge University Library
2014	New Scholar Award	Bibliographical Society of America
2014	Mark Samuels Lasner Fellowship in Printing History	American Printing History Association
2015	Postdoctoral Fellowship	British Academy
2016	Wolfgang Ratjen Prize, "for distinguished research in the field of graphic arts"	Zentralinstitut für Kunstgeschichte, Munich
2016	IFPDA Book Awards, Honourable Mention (for Printing Colour 1400–1700)	International Fine Print Dealers Association
2017	Rising Star Engagement Award	British Academy
2019	Elected FSA and FRHistS	Society of Antiquaries of London and Royal Historical Society
2020	Schulman and Bullard Article Prize	Association of Print Scholars
2024	Proceedings of the British Academy Publication Award (for Printing Colour 1700–1830)	British Academy
2024	Proceedings of the British Academy Publication Award (for Printing Things)	British Academy
2026	Individual Laureate Award, "for a distinguished contribution to the study, recording, preservation or dissemination of printing history"	American Printing History Association
2026	IFPDA Book Awards, Honourable Mention (for Printing Colour 1700–1830)	International Fine Print Dealers Association

== Selected lectures ==
As of September 2023, Savage has delivered approximately 80 invited talks, public lectures, and keynotes across a dozen countries. Selected major lectures include:

- Frederik Muller Annual Lecture in Book History, University of Amsterdam, 2021
- Keynote, annual meeting of the Society for the History of Authorship, Reading and Publishing (SHARP), 2022
- Relaunch lecture, Hanes Lecture Series in Bibliography, University of North Carolina at Chapel Hill, 2022
