= Charles Savage =

Charles or Charlie Savage may refer to:

== People ==
- Charles Savage (banker) (fl. 1740s), governor of the Bank of England, 1745–1747
- Charles Savage (beachcomber) (died 1813), sailor and beachcomber known for his exploits on the islands of Fiji
- Charles Roscoe Savage (1832–1909), British-born landscape and portrait photographer
- Charles R. Savage (1906–1976), U.S. representative from Washington
- Charlie Savage (journalist) (born 1975), New York Times reporter and Pulitzer Prize winner in 2007
- Charlie Savage (footballer) (born 2003), Wales international footballer

== Other uses ==
- Charlie Savage (novel), a 2019 novel by Irish writer Roddy Doyle
- Charles Savage, a fictional character in Hollyoaks, later Dr. Charles S'avage
- Charlie Savage, a protagonist of the novel of the same name by Roddy Doyle
- Charles-Haden Savage, fictional character portrayed by Steve Martin in Only Murders in the Building
