= Denis Sauvage =

French translator, historian, publisher, philologist and historiographer

Denis Sauvage (Fontenailles, 1520–1587) was a French translator, historian, publisher, philologist, and historiographer at the service of Henri II.

== Publications ==
=== History ===
- Sommaire des histoires du royaume de Naples : qui traicte de toutes choses advenues en iceluy, composé premièrement en langage italien par M. Pandolfo Collenuccio, et depuis n'aguères mis en françois par Denis Sauvage, avecques annotations (1546; 1553)
- Les Annales et croniques de France, jadis composées par feu maistre Nicole Gilles, imprimées nouvellement sur la correction du signeur Denis Sauvage, et additionnées jusques à cest an mil cinq cens cinquante trois (1553)
- Les Mémoires de messire Philippe de Commines, chevalier, seigneur d'Argenton : sur les principaux faicts, & gestes de Louis onziéme & de Charles huictiéme, son filz, Roys de France, Reveus & corrigés, pour la seconde fois, par Denis Sauvage de Fontenailles en Brie, historiographe de très-chrestien roy Henry IIe de ce nom (1559; 1561; 1581). Texte en ligne : et
- Le premier volume de l'Histoire et cronique de Messire Iehan Froissart, reveu et corrigé sus divers exemplaires et suyvant les bons auteurs, par Denis Sauvage, le second volume de l'Histoire et cronique de Messire Iehan Froissart; le tiers volume de l'Histoire et cronique de Messire Iehan Froissart; le quart volume de l'Histoire et cronique de Messire Iehan Froissart (1559–60). Texte en ligne :
- Cronique de Flandres, anciennement composée par auteur incertain et nouvellement mise en lumière (1562).
- Les Mémoires de messire Olivier de La Marche, premier maistre d'hostel de l'archeduc Philippe d'Austriche, comte de Flandres (1562)
- Les Croniques et annales de France composées par feu maistre Nicole Gilles, nouvellement imprimées sur la correction de maistre Denis Sauvage, et additionnées jusques au roy Charles neufiesme à présent régnant (1571)

=== Translations ===
- La Circé de M. Giovan Baptista Gello, nouvellement mise en françois (1550)
- Philosophie d'amour de M. Léon Hébreu, traduite d'italien en françois (1577; 1580; 1590; 1893). Read online :
- Histoire de Paolo Giovio, sur les choses faictes et avenues de son temps en toutes les parties du monde, traduictes du latin en françois (2 volumes, 1581)
- Opuscule des vertus et notables faictes des femmes, de Plutarque, 1546.
