= Savage: The Ultimate Quest for Survival =

1996 video game

- Developer: Viridis Corporation
- Publisher: Discovery Channel Multimedia
- Platforms: MS-DOS; Windows
- Release: 1996
- Genre: Educational

Savage: The Ultimate Quest for Survival is a 1996 educational video game by Discovery Channel.

== Gameplay ==
Savage: The Ultimate Quest for Survival is a game in which players take on the role of a lion roaming the Serengeti, hunting animals such as gazelles and wildebeests while steering clear of dangerous opponents like hippos, leopards, and other large creatures. Each successful kill awards points, and failure in a hunt drains resources or may result in injury or death. Across ten levels, each stage presents a specific objective; once it is completed, the game ends the level with a performance tally that compares results to a set par and grants bonus points. More than twenty species appear throughout the environments, behaving in ways that mirror their real-world counterparts—for instance, prey fleeing after a failed chase or hyenas harassing the lion. Tourists also appear as point‑bearing targets, though attacking them or other large animals carries risk. In addition to the main gameplay, a multimedia learning mode offers self‑running video clips tied to each level, presenting information about lion behavior and encounters, such as the dangers posed by adult giraffes.

== Reception ==
Reception

Review scores
Publication	Score
Entertainment Weekly	B+
GameSpot	4.5/10
PC Player	2/5
Quad-City Times	2/4

Rebecca B. Anderson of GameSpot wrote that while the game was aesthetically pleasing, it was not fun as a "game". Bob Strauss of Entertainment Weekly thought the virtual Serengeti was the "real star" of the title.
