= Savages (Theory of a Deadman album) =

Studio album by Theory of a Deadman
- Released: July 29, 2014
- Recorded: 2013–2014
- Genres: Post-grunge, alternative metal
- Length: 46:40
- Labels: Roadrunner, 604
- Producer: Howard Benson

Theory of a Deadman chronology
The Truth Is... (2011)	Savages (2014)	Angel Acoustic EP (2015)

Singles from Savages
- 1. "Drown" Released: April 22, 2014; 2. "Savages" Released: September 16, 2014; 3. "Angel" Released: February 24, 2015; 4. "Blow" Released: September 15, 2015

Savages is the fifth studio album by Canadian rock band Theory of a Deadman. It was released on July 29, 2014.

Professional ratings
Review scores
Source	Rating
AllMusic	2.5/5 stars
Revolver	3/5 stars
PlanetMosh	4/5 stars
Ultimate Guitar	6.4/10 stars

== Track listing ==
No.	Title	Writer(s)	Length
1.	"Drown"		3:41
2.	"Blow"		3:35
3.	"Savages" (featuring Alice Cooper)		3:33
4.	"Misery of Mankind"		3:23
5.	"Salt in the Wound"		3:38
6.	"Angel"	Jennifer Decilveo, Tyler Connolly	3:22
7.	"Heavy"		3:02
8.	"Panic Room"		3:14
9.	"The One"	Tyler Connolly, Cristi Vaughan	3:58
10.	"Livin' My Life Like a Country Song" (featuring Joe Don Rooney)		3:20
11.	"World War Me"		3:14
12.	"In Ruins"		3:19
13.	"The Sun Has Set on Me"		5:20
Total length:			46:40

== Personnel ==
Theory of a Deadman

- Tyler Connolly - vocals, guitar, mandolin, talk-box on "Drown"
- Dave Brenner - guitar, backing vocals
- Dean Back - bass, backing vocals
- Joey Dandeneau - drums, percussion, backing vocals

Guest musicians

- Alice Cooper - guest vocals on "Savages"
- Joe Don Rooney - guest vocals/additional guitar on "Livin' My Life Like a Country Song"

Production

- Howard Benson - producer
- Mike Plotnikoff - recording
- Chris Lord-Alge - mixing
- Ted Jensen - mastering

== Charts ==
=== Weekly charts ===
Charts	Peak position
Canadian Albums Chart	4
U.S. Billboard 200	8
U.S. Billboard Rock Albums	4
U.S. Billboard Digital Albums	7
U.S. Billboard Alternative Albums	1
U.S. Billboard Hard Rock Albums	1

=== Year-end charts ===
Chart (2014)	Position
US Alternative Albums (Billboard)	46
US Hard Rock Albums (Billboard)	20
US Top Rock Albums (Billboard)	73

=== Singles ===
Single	Peak chart positions	
Single	CAN Rock	US Main
"Drown"	7	4
"Savages (feat. Alice Cooper)"	—	25
"Angel"	33	2
"Blow"	—	12

== Certifications ==
Region	Certification	Certified units/sales
Canada (Music Canada)	Gold	40,000^{‡}
^{‡} Sales+streaming figures based on certification alone.
