= Richard Savage =

Richard Savage may refer to:

- Richard Savage (poet) (c. 1697–1743), English poet
- Richard Savage (cricketer) (born 1955), English cricketer
- Richard Akinwande Savage (1874–1935), physician, journalist and politician in Lagos, Nigeria
- Richard Gabriel Akinwande Savage (1903–1993), physician, soldier, and first person of West African heritage to receive a British Army commission
- Richard Henry Savage (1846–1903), American military officer and author
- Richard Savage, 4th Earl Rivers (c. 1654–1712)
- Rick Savage (born 1960), bassist with Def Leppard
- Richard Savage (1842), a novel by Charles Whitehead
