= Gary Savage =

Gary Savage may refer to:

- Gary Savage (cricketer) (born 1978), South African-born Argentine cricketer
- Gary Savage (hurler) (born 1981), Irish hurler
- Gary Savage (engineer), British Formula One engineer
- Dr. Gary Savage, a Deus Ex character
