= Senate House, London =

Administrative centre of the University of London

Coordinates: 51.5210°N 0.1287°W

Senate House
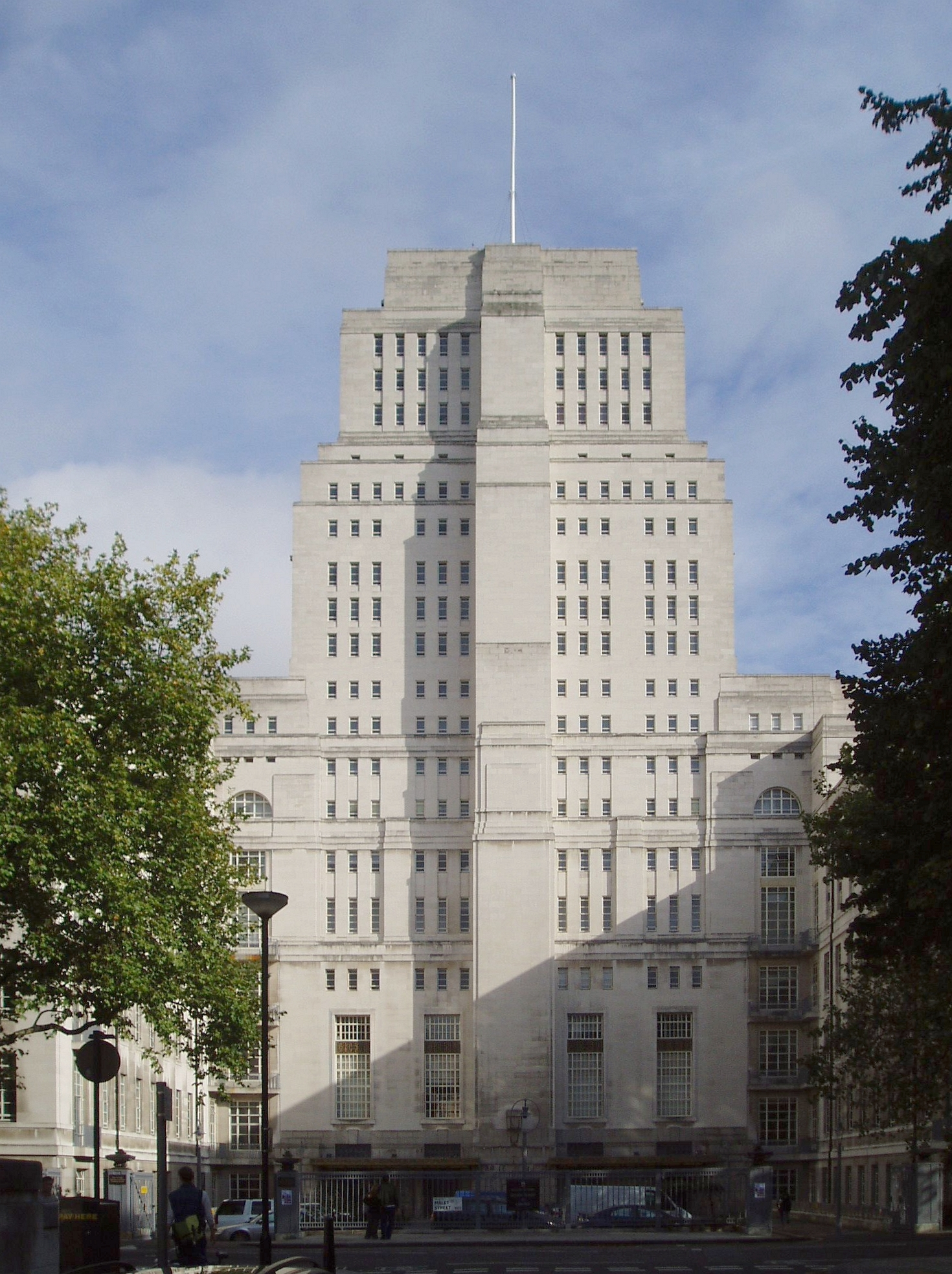
- The Senate House of the University of London

General information
- Architectural style: Art Deco, Neo-Classical
- Location: London, WC1; United Kingdom
- Construction started: 1932
- Completed: 1937
- Client: University of London

Design and construction
- Architect: Charles Holden

Listed Building – Grade II*
- Official name: Senate House, London
- Designated: 28 March 1969
- Reference no.: 1113107

Senate House is the administrative centre of the University of London, situated in the heart of Bloomsbury, London, immediately to the north of the British Museum.

The Art Deco building was constructed between 1932 and 1937 as the first phase of a large uncompleted scheme designed for the university by Charles Holden. It consists of 19 floors and is 210 feet (64 m) high.

During the Second World War, the building's use by the Ministry of Information inspired two works of fiction by English writers. The earliest, Graham Greene's novel The Ministry of Fear (1943), inspired a 1944 film adaptation directed by Fritz Lang set in Bloomsbury. The description of the Ministry of Truth in George Orwell's novel Nineteen Eighty-Four (1949) evokes the Senate House. His wife Eileen worked in the building for the Censorship Department of the Ministry of Information.

Today the main building houses the University of London's Central Academic Bodies and activities, including the offices of the vice-chancellor of the university, the entire collection of the Senate House Library, six of the eight research institutes of the School of Advanced Study, as well as departments of distance learning provider University of London Worldwide.

== History ==
After the First World War the University of London, then based at the Imperial Institute in Kensington, was in urgent need of new office and teaching space to allow for its growth and expansion. In 1921, the government bought 11 acres (4.5 ha) of land in Bloomsbury from the Duke of Bedford to provide a new site for the university. However, many within the university were opposed to a move, and, in 1926, the Duke bought back the land. However, the election of William Beveridge to the post of vice-chancellor of the university in June 1926 was highly significant as Beveridge supported a move to Bloomsbury. Beveridge persuaded the Rockefeller Foundation to donate £400,000 to the university and the original site was reacquired in 1927.

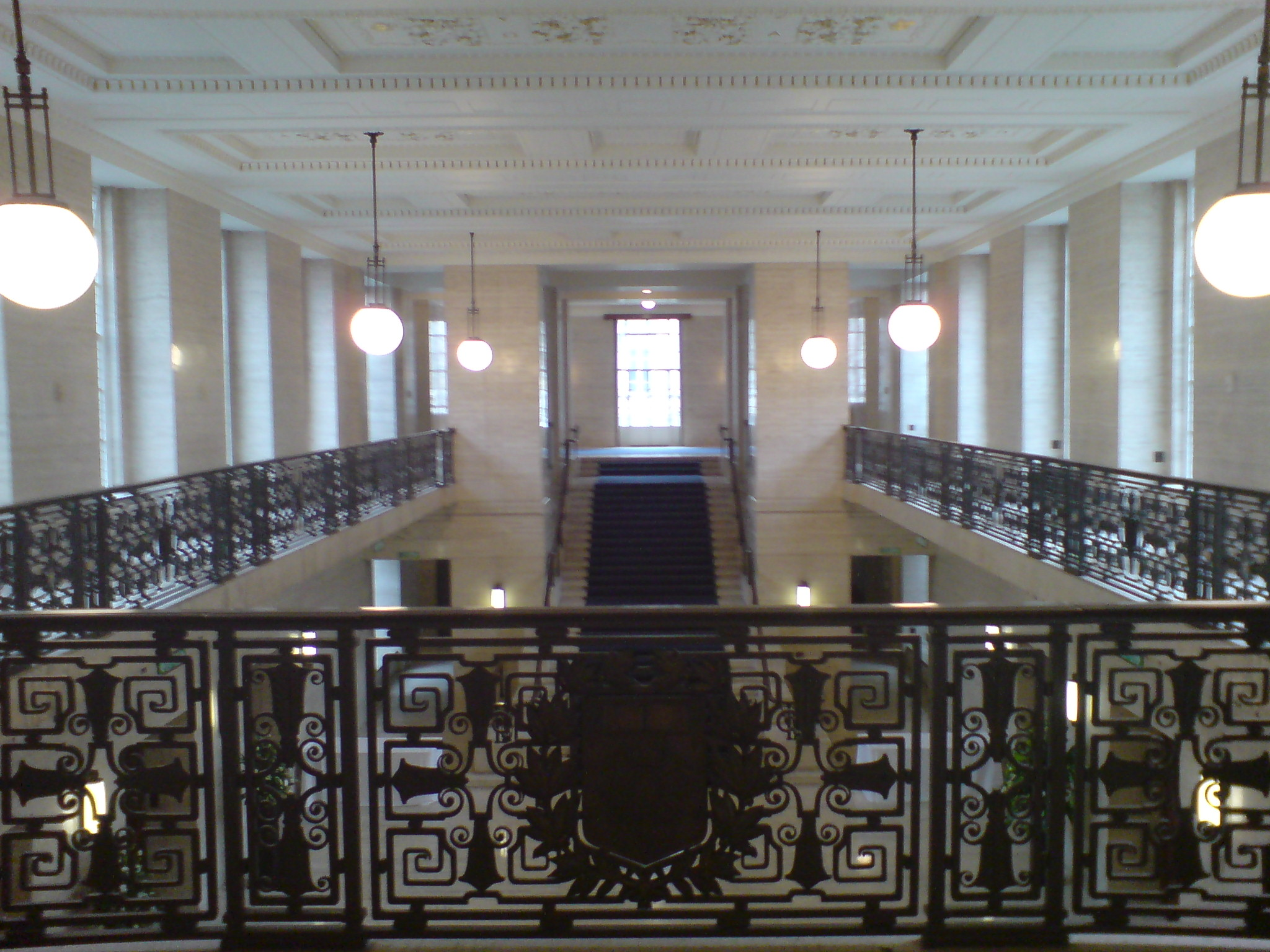
The Crush Hall of Senate House

Beveridge saw the university as one "for the nation and the world, drawing from overseas as many students as Oxford and Cambridge and all the other English universities together." and specified that "the central symbol of the University on the Bloomsbury site can not fittingly look like an imitation of any other university, it must not be a replica from the Middle Ages. It should be something that could not have been built by any earlier generation than this, and can only be at home in London ... (the building) means a chance to enrich London – to give London at its heart not just more streets and shops ... but a great architectural feature ... an academic island in swirling tides of traffic, a world of learning in a world of affairs."

The grand Art Deco design was the work of Charles Holden, who was appointed as architect in March 1931 from a short list which also included Giles Gilbert Scott, Percy Scott Worthington, and Arnold Dunbar Smith. In making their choice, Beveridge and the Principal, Edwin Deller, were influenced by the success of Holden's recently completed 55 Broadway, designed as the headquarters for the London Electric Railway and then the tallest office building in London.

Holden's original plan for the university building was for a single structure covering the whole site, stretching almost 1,200 feet (370 m) from Montague Place to Torrington Street. It comprised a central spine linked by a series of wings to the perimeter façade and enclosing a series of courtyards. The scheme was to be topped by two towers; the taller Senate House and a smaller one to the north. The design featured elevations of load-bearing brick work faced with Portland stone. Construction began in 1932 and was undertaken by Holland, Hannen & Cubitts.

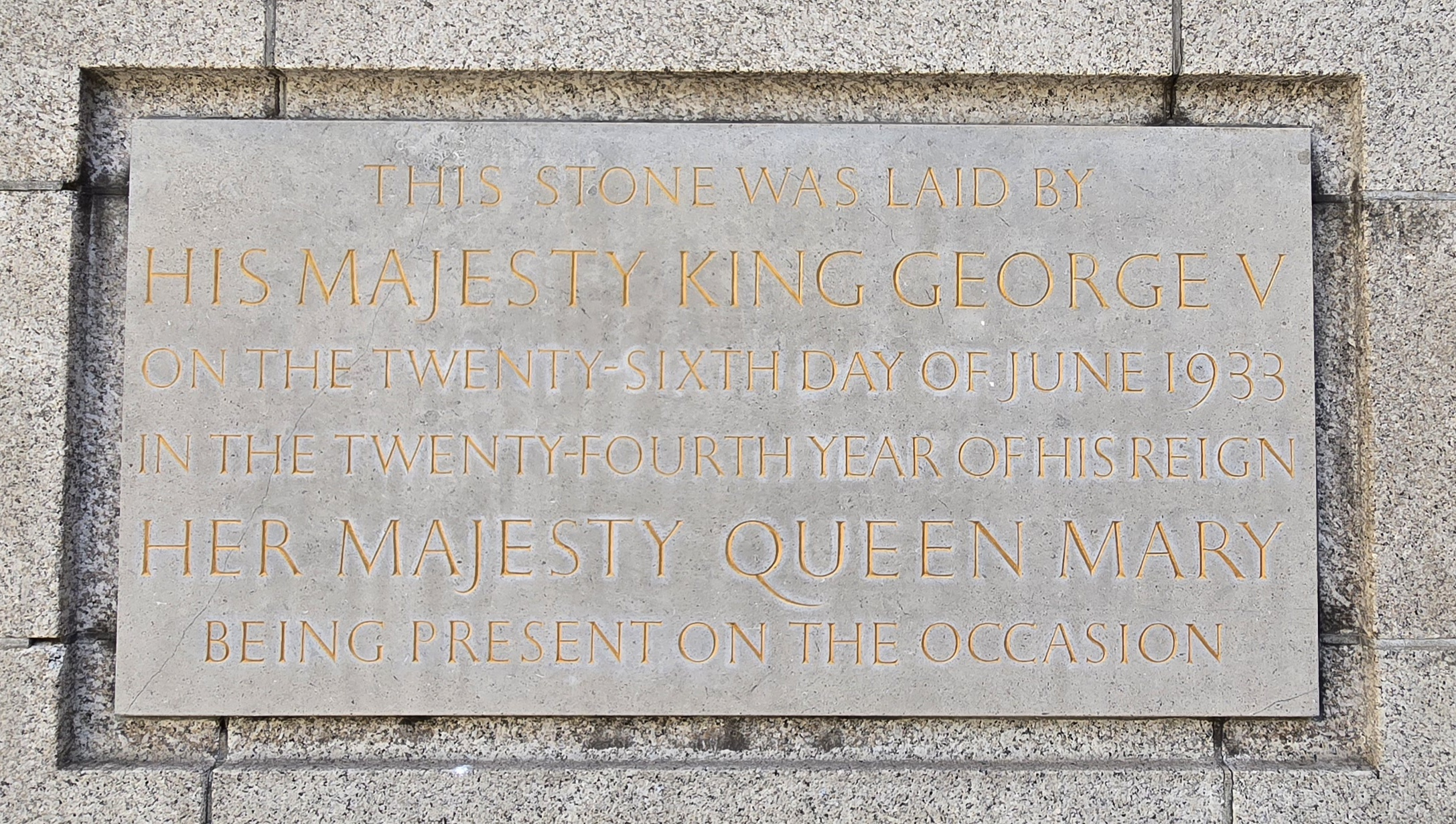
The Foundation Stone of Senate House, commemorating the ceremony led by King George V in 1933

King George V laid the ceremonial foundation stone on 26 June 1933 and the first staff moved in during 1936, the university's centenary year. On 27 November 1936, a group of university officials, led by the Principal, Sir Edwin Deller, went out to inspect the work in progress. Suddenly, without warning, a skip being pushed by a workman overhead accidentally fell down and hit them. All were rushed to University College Hospital, where three days later, Deller died of his injuries. Due to a lack of funds, the full design was gradually cut back, and only the Senate House and Library were completed in 1937, although the external flanking wings of the north-eastern courtyard were not constructed. As he had with his earlier buildings, Holden also prepared the designs for the individual elements of the interior design. The completion of the buildings for the Institute of Education and the School of Oriental Studies followed, but the onset of the Second World War prevented any further progress on the full scheme.

=== Critical opinion ===
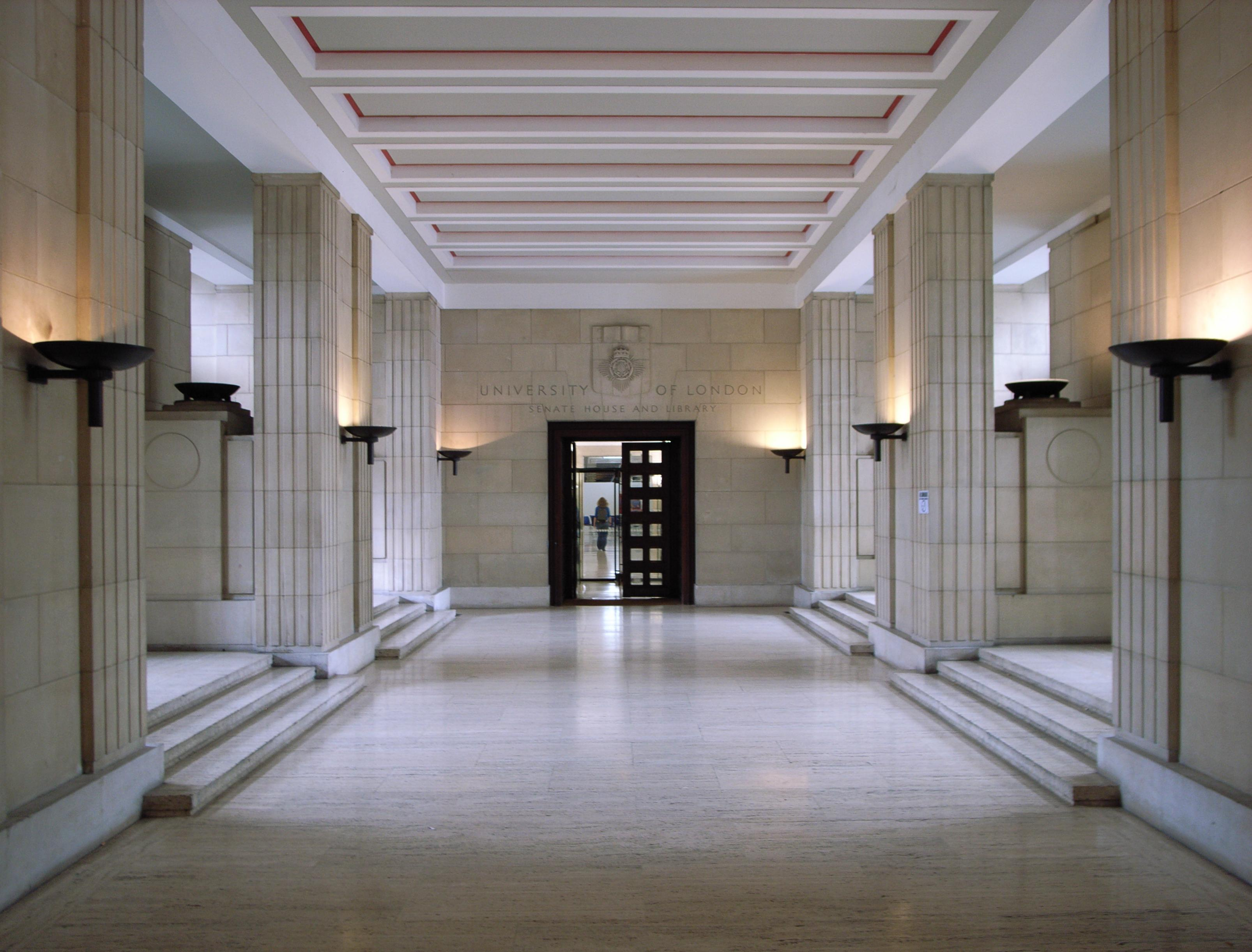
Senate House Entrance, facing south block

The architectural character and scale of the building has received both positive and negative criticism since its construction. Steen Eiler Rasmussen, a friend of Holden, commented that, with the expansive design, "the London University is swallowing more and more of the old houses, and this quarter – which the Duke of Bedford laid out for good domestic houses – has taken on quite a different character." Evelyn Waugh, in Put Out More Flags (1942), describes it as "the vast bulk of London University insulting the autumnal sky."

Positive comments came from functionalist architect Erich Mendelsohn in 1938, who wrote to Holden that he was "very much taken and am convinced that there is no finer building in London." Architectural historian Arnold Whittick described the building as a "static massive pyramid ... obviously designed to last for a thousand years", but thought "the interior is more pleasing than the exterior. There is essentially the atmosphere of dignity, serenity and repose that one associates with the architecture of ancient Greece." Nikolaus Pevsner was less enthusiastic. He described its style as "strangely semi-traditional, undecided modernism" and summarised the result: "The design certainly does not possess the vigour and directness of Charles Holden's smaller Underground stations." Others have described it as Stalinist or as totalitarian due to its great scale.

Holden recognised that his architectural style placed him in "rather a curious position, not quite in the fashion and not quite out of it; not enough of a traditionalist to please the traditionalists and not enough of a modernist to please the modernists."

=== Present day ===
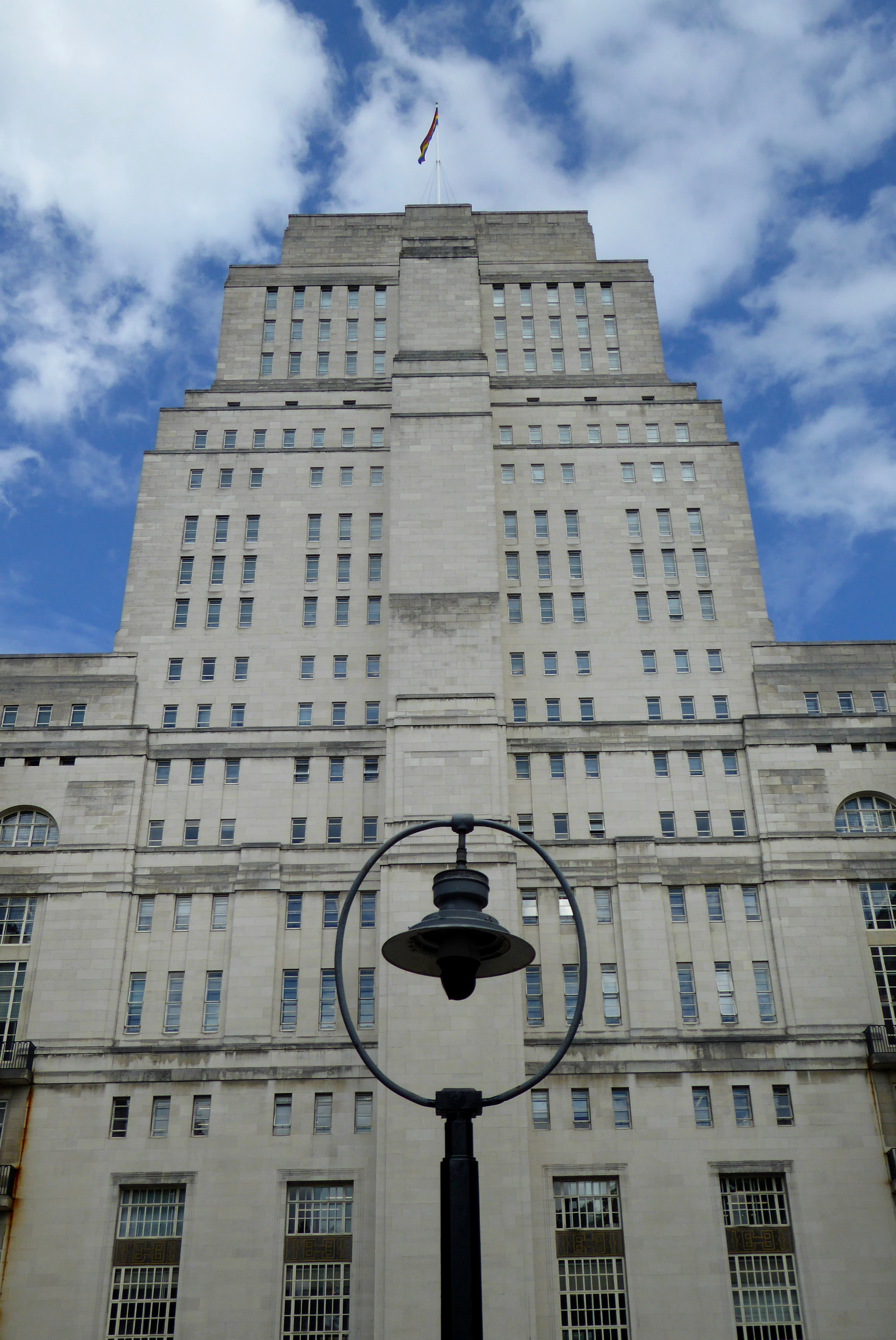
The Senate House tower, as seen from below

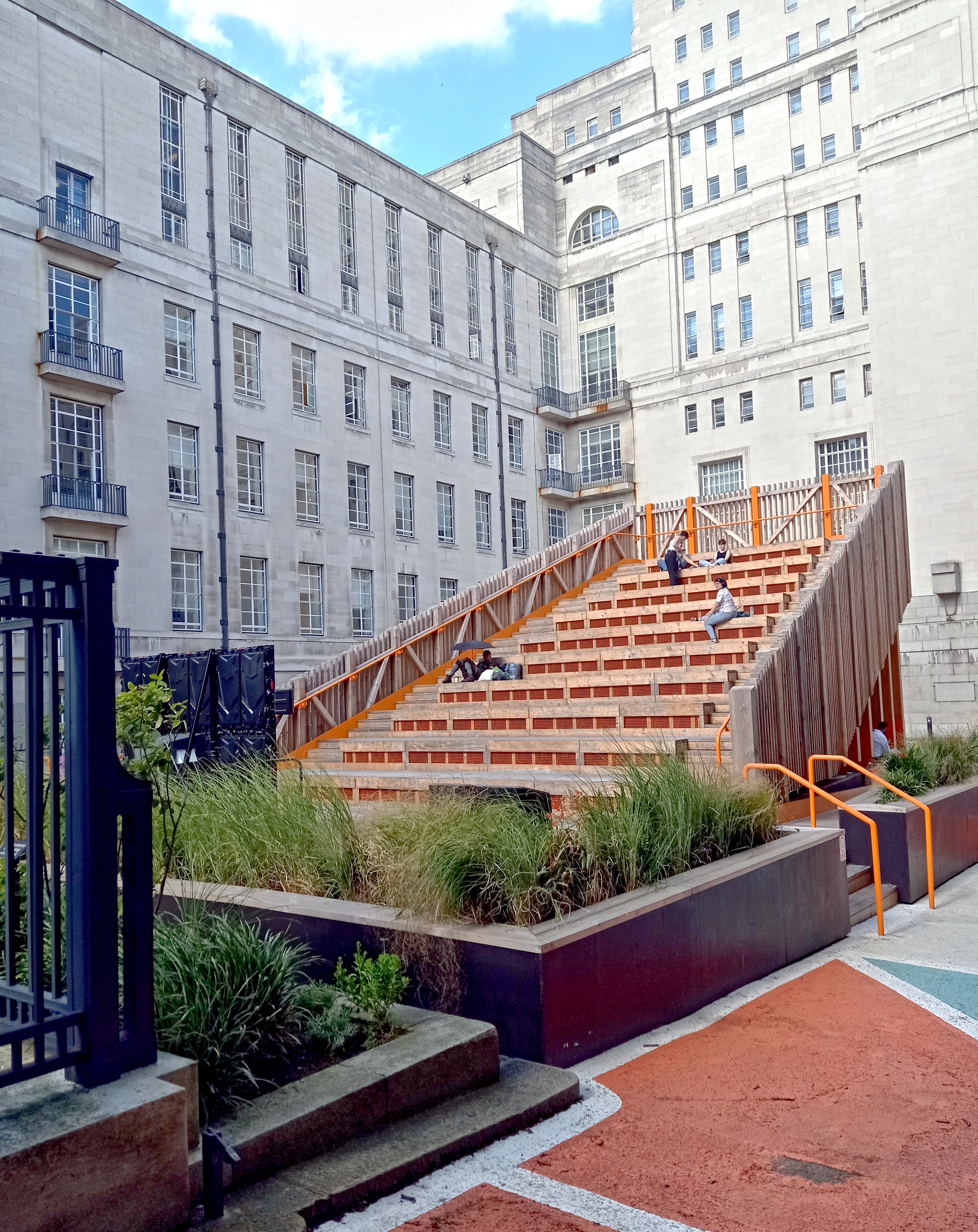
Senate House Steps, August 2023

Senate House remains a prominent landmark throughout Bloomsbury and is visible from some distance away. The building was listed as Grade II* in 1969. Following a multimillion-pound refurbishment in 2006, Senate House has also become a conference and event venue playing host to some of the city's most prestigious events including London Fashion Week.

Following the relaxation of the rules in the UK on university status under the Major government and consequential stirrings towards full independence of the larger London University colleges, the future of Senate House and its library has from time to time been called into question. However, Senate House remains, and continues to be home both to the vice-chancellor of the University of London and to the deep resources of the university library; indeed, it re-opened in 2006 after undergoing a refurbishment to bring it up to modern standards and to reinstate some of Holden's original interiors.

Some schools in constituent colleges, such as the Birkbeck School of Computer Science and Information Systems (until 2010), and the School of Advanced Study (the UK's national centre for the facilitation and promotion of research in the humanities and social sciences) are or were based in Senate House. SOAS moved into the north block of Senate House from 2016.

The main entrance is from Malet Street to the west and the rear entrance from Russell Square to the east.

In recent years, Senate House has been associated with high-profile industrial relations disputes. In December 2018, a boycott of the University of London, including Senate House, organised by the Independent Workers' Union of Great Britain and supported by a number of high-profile politicians, journalists and academics, including John McDonnell, Owen Jones, Ken Loach and David Graeber came into effect. This campaign of 'direct action' aims to put pressure on the University of London to bring outsourced workers back into the employment of the university by targeting what is a major source of both prestige and revenue for the university. Numerous events during the 2018–19 academic year were cancelled or relocated, and over 350 individual academics, as well as a number of UCU branches all signatories to the campaign. In May 2019 receptionists, porters as well post room and audio-visual (AV) equipment workers were made University of London staff, followed by security guards in May 2020.

== Senate House Library ==
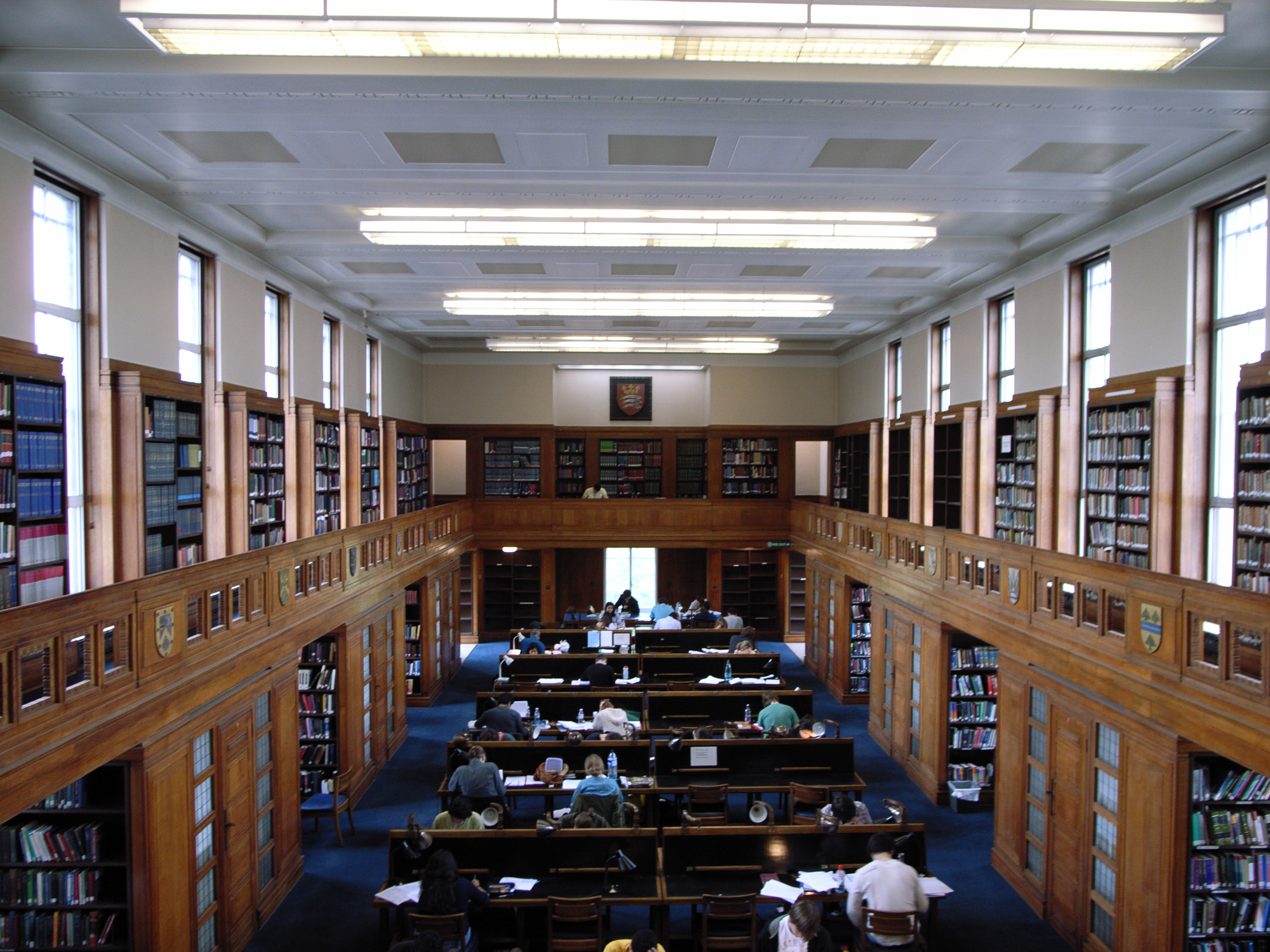
Senate House Library

Senate House Library (formerly known as the University of London Library) occupies the fourth to the 18th floors of the building, with the public areas of the library on the fourth to seventh floors. The library is open to staff and students of all colleges within the university (although levels of access differ between institutions) and contains material relevant chiefly to arts, humanities, and social science subjects.

The library is administered by the central university as part of the Senate House Libraries, and in 2005 had more than 32,000 registered users. It holds around three million volumes, including 120,000 volumes printed before 1851. The library started with the foundation of the University of London in 1836, but began to develop from 1871 when a book fund was started.

Along with a subscription to over 5,200 journals, other resources include the Goldsmiths' Library of Economic Literature, and the Palaeography room's collection of western European manuscripts. The library also holds over 170,000 theses by graduate students. From 2006 onwards, the library has been undergoing a comprehensive refurbishment process.

The library is also home to the University of London archives, which include the central archive of the university itself and many other collections, including the papers of social reformer Charles Booth, philosopher Herbert Spencer, actress and mystic Florence Farr, author and artist Thomas Sturge Moore, writer Opal Whiteley, and publishing company Gerald Duckworth and Company Ltd.

Since June 2021, the librarian has been Catríona Cannon; she is also director of the Library Transformation Programme for the University of London.

== In popular culture ==
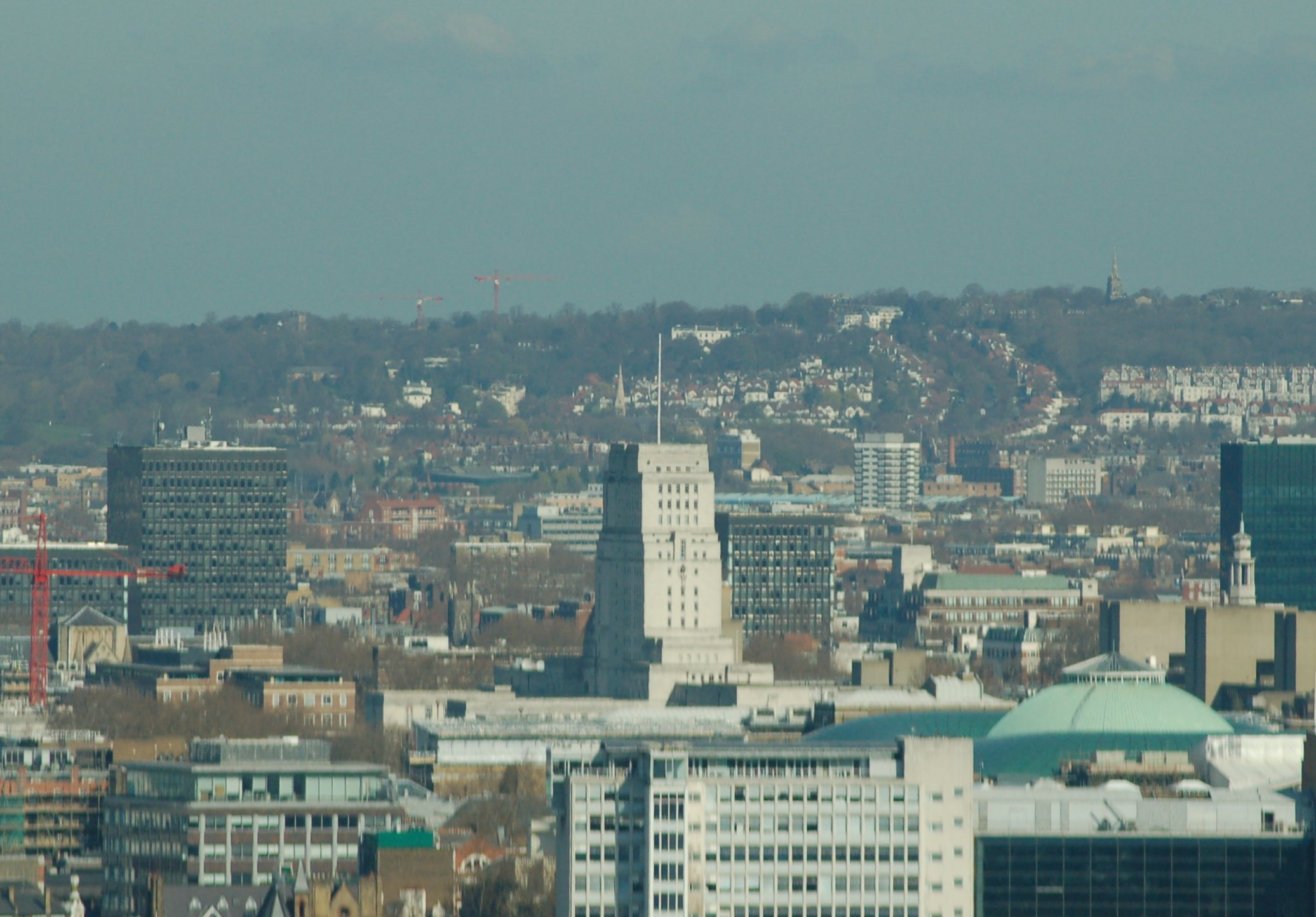
View of Senate House from London Eye

Due to its imposing architecture, Senate House is popular with the film and television industries as a shooting location; often for official buildings. It inspired the description of the Ministry of Truth in George Orwell's Nineteen Eighty-Four.

Films that have featured the building include the 1995 version of Richard III (interior of a government building), the 1984 film of Nineteen Eighty-Four (exterior of the apartment building where O'Brien lives), Blue Ice (a hotel), Spy Game (lobby of CIA Headquarters), Batman Begins (lobby of a court), The Dark Knight Rises (a costume ball), Nanny McPhee and the Big Bang (a war office), Fast & Furious 6 (Moscow Interpol HQ), Jack Ryan: Shadow Recruit (Moscow restaurant), No Time to Die (MI6 Reception), The 355 (a Shanghai casino),, The Flash (Central City Research Center), and Spider-Man: Brand New Day (Damage Control HQ).

For television, the building has featured in Jeeves and Wooster (the exterior of Wooster's Manhattan apartment building), Black Mirror, The Crown, Killing Eve, Secret Invasion, and other programmes. Senate House is a prominent location in the first chapters of the 1951 post-apocalyptic novel The Day of the Triffids by John Wyndham, and was thus used (as itself) in the television adaptation The Day of the Triffids.

In C. J. Sansom’s 2014 alternative history novel, Dominion, the building serves as the German embassy by 1952.
