= Savages (Theory of a Deadman song) =

Single by Theory of a Deadman featuring Alice Cooper

from the album Savages
- Released: September 16, 2014
- Genre: Alternative metal, hard rock
- Length: 3:33
- Label: Roadrunner; 604
- Composers: Tyler Connolly; Dave Brenner; Dean Back; Joey Dandeneau
- Lyricists: Tyler Connolly; Dave Brenner; Dean Back; Joey Dandeneau; Christine Danielle Connolly
- Producer: Howard Benson

Theory of a Deadman featuring Alice Cooper singles chronology
"Drown" (2014)	"Savages" (2014)	"Angel" (2015)

Music video
- "Savages" on YouTube

"Savages" is the second, and self-titled single on Theory of a Deadman's fifth studio album Savages. The single was released on September 16, 2014.

== Chart positions ==
Chart (2014)	Peak position
US Mainstream Rock (Billboard)	25
