= Paul Savage =

Paul Savage may refer to:

- Paul Savage (musician) (born 1971), Scottish musician and record producer
- Paul Savage (bobsleigh) (born 1935), American bobsledder
- Paul Savage (curler) (born 1947), Canadian curler
- Paul Savage (politician) (died 1983), Rhodesian and Zimbabwean farmer and politician

== See also ==
- Paul Sauvage (disambiguation)
