= Savage Lake =

Lake in the state of Minnesota, United States

- Location within Minnesota
- Location: Ramsey County, Minnesota
- Coordinates: 45°1′12″N 93°5′30″W
- Type: lake
- Surface area: 17.4 acres (7.0 ha)
- Max. depth: 5.9 feet (1.8 m)

Savage Lake was a lake in Ramsey County, in the U.S. state of Minnesota. Currently, it is designated a "watershed," thanks to damage done to the lake when Interstate 35E intersected the lake in the 1970s. Ramsey county's website says, "Because it is divided by the highway, the eastern and western basins of the lake are connected by a pipe that flows from the west basin into the southwest corner of the eastern basin. Although called a lake, Savage Lake is actually a 27 acres (11 ha) wetland. West Savage Lake is 17.4 acres (7.0 ha) with a maximum depth of 5.9 feet (1.8 m); East Savage Lake is 9.6 acres (3.9 ha) with a maximum depth of 5.7 feet (1.7 m)." Before the state's Department of Transportation decided to dump the silt and road refuse from an I35E expansion in 2009, the lake was deeper and spring-fed. Within a few weeks of the opening of the freeway drainage design, the spring was clogged with silt and the lake began to fill.

Savage Lake was named for the Indians (formerly called savages) who were once common in the area.
