= Rubby =

Rubby is a masculine given name. Notable people with the name include:

- Rubby Opio Aweri (1953–2022), Ugandan lawyer and judge
- Rubby De La Rosa (born 1989), Dominican baseball player
- Rubby Pérez (1956–2025), Dominican merengue singer
- Rubby Sherr (1913–2013), American nuclear physicist
