= Tower Ticker =

Tower Ticker was a column in the Chicago Tribune, and later a blog. It was originated by Jimmy Savage in 1948 and focused on "night life, show business, and the activities of people in the news".

It has been conducted by:

- Jimmy Savage, 1948–1951 (credited as "Savage")
- Will Leonard
- Herb Lyon, 1954–1968
- Robert Wiedrich
- Aaron Gold ( –1983)

(hiatus)

- Phil Rosenthal (column and blog) (2005–2011)

== External references ==
- Tower Ticker blog
