= Donald Savage =

Donald Savage may refer to:

- Don Savage (1919–1961), American baseball player for the New York Yankees
- Don Savage (basketball) (1928–2010), American basketball player for the Syracuse Nationals
