= Frederick Savage =

Frederick Savage may refer to:

- Frederick Savage (schoolmaster), British schoolmaster who founded Seaford College
- Frederick Savage (engineer), English engineer and inventor
- Fred Savage (Frederick Aaron Savage), American actor and television director
