= Ruby Huston =

New Zealand contemporary artist

Ruby Ellen Huston (born 1938) is a New Zealand artist. She is known for her drawing and painting, subtle surrealism and colour predominantly of landscapes, flowers and still life.

== Career ==
Huston started exhibiting her work from 1975, and her first exhibition was held at the New Vision Gallery, Auckland in 1978. She was a member and Vice President of the Auckland Society of Arts, and a foundation member of the Associated Women Artists (A.W.A).

Huston was an invited artist by ANZAS to exhibit drawings which toured throughout New Zealand 1983–1984.

Huston's work has been exhibited in various New Zealand private and public galleries, and her work exhibited in numerous overseas collections.

Huston won the 1991 Norsewear Art Award, in Hawke's Bay. She won second prize in the 1998 Mainland Art Award. Huston was also finalist in the 1978 Tokoroa Art Award, 1984 Team MacMillan Ford Art Award, Auckland, the 1986 Montana Art Award, Wellington, the 1989 Norsewear Art Award, and the Mainland Art Award 1997.

Huston has work in the permanent collection at the Dowse Art Museum, the Arts House Trust, the Orthodox Academy of Art, Crete, the Hawkes Bay Art Gallery, and the Whangarei Art Gallery.

Huston's art files are held at the E. H. McCormick Research Library, Auckland Art Gallery Toi o Tāmaki, University of Otago Hocken Collections Uare Taoka o Hākena, Museum of New Zealand Te Papa Tongarewa.
