= Senate House Libraries =

Former library system of the University of London

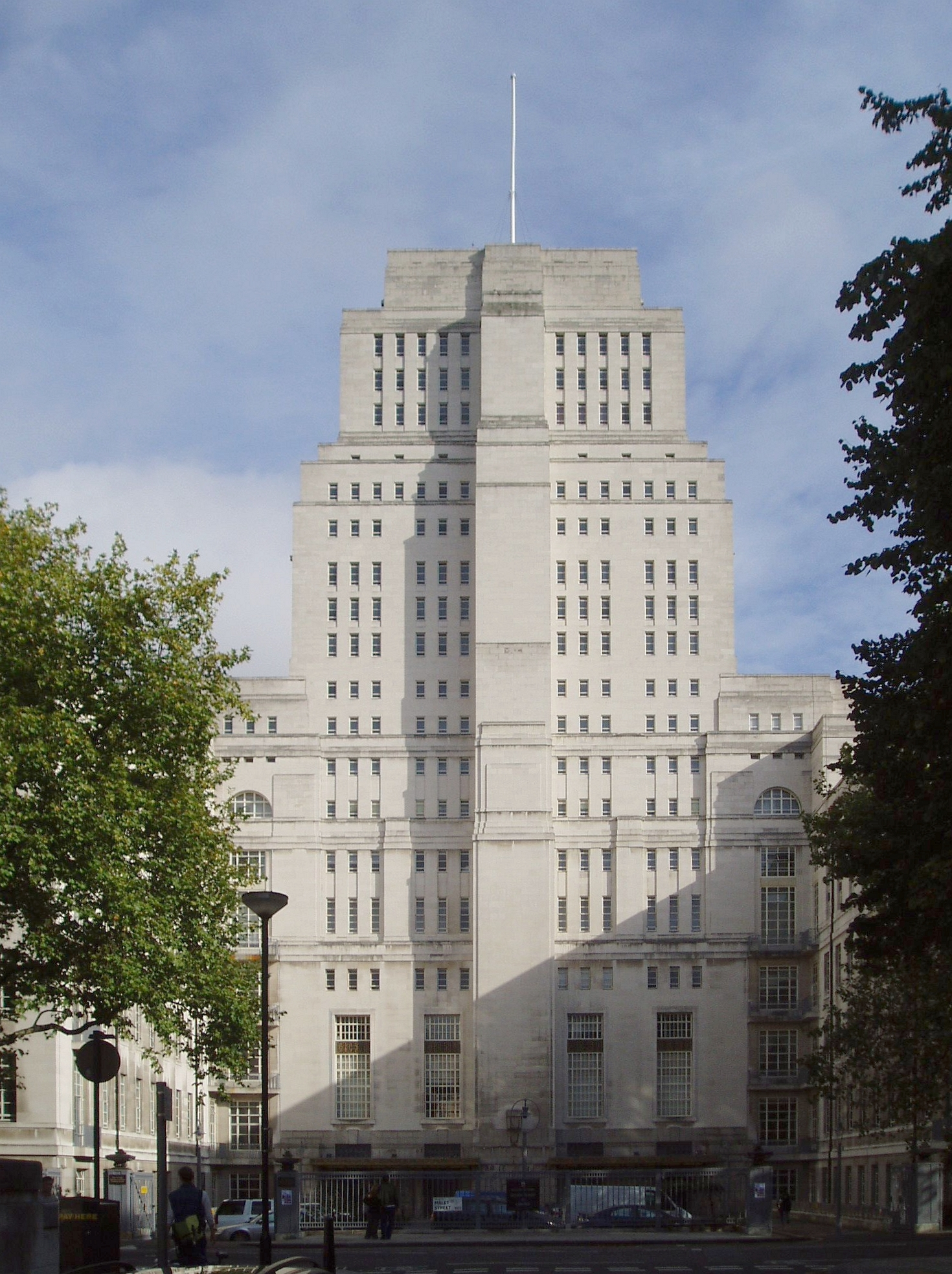
Senate House, the headquarters of the Senate House Libraries

The Senate House Libraries (SHL), formerly The University of London Research Library Services, was a group of libraries based in Bloomsbury which together comprised an extensive research collection across the humanities and social sciences. It existed under this name from 2011 to 2013.

SHL was a division of the University of London, headquartered at Senate House on Russell Square, and was formed by bringing together the former University of London Library (now Senate House Library) and the libraries of the various institutes comprising the School of Advanced Study. The previous umbrella name, University of London Research Library Services (ULRLS) was replaced by Senate House Libraries on 1 April 2011 in a rebranding exercise.

The following eight libraries were part of SHL:

- Institute for the Study of the Americas library
- Institute of Advanced Legal Studies library
- Institute of Classical Studies library
- Institute of Commonwealth Studies library
- Institute of Germanic and Romance Studies library
- Institute of Historical Research library
- Senate House Library
- Warburg Institute library

The combined holdings of the libraries amount to almost 3 million volumes, including many thousands of journals, and numerous deep and rich collections of research materials in subjects across the disciplines.

The Senate House Libraries group was dismantled in 2013; in 2014 Senate House Library joined the School of Advanced Study. There are now four independent libraries in the School of Advanced Study: Senate House Library and the libraries of the Institute of Advanced Legal Studies, the Institute of Classical Studies, the Institute of Historical Research and the Warburg Institute.
