= Ruby Cutter Savage =

American singer

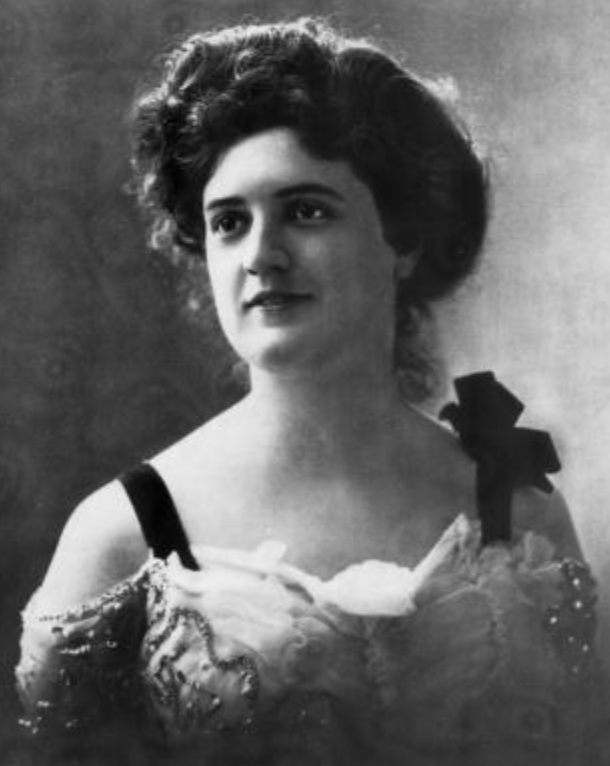
- Ruby Cutter Savage, from a 1904 publication
- Born: Ruby Clementine Cutter; October 7, 1876; Boston, Massachusetts, U.S.
- Died: July 9, 1949 (age 72); Los Angeles, California, U.S.
- Other names: Rena Saville, Ruby Cutter Willis
- Occupation: Singer

Ruby Clementine Cutter Savage Willis (October 7, 1876 – July 9, 1949) was an American soprano singer active in the early 20th century.

== Early life and education ==
Cutter was born in Boston, the daughter of Fitch Henry Cutter and Mary Alvida Clark Cutter. She was a student of Arthur J. Hubbard in Boston, and studied voice with W. Elliott Haslam in Paris. In New York City, she studied German or French diction with Margaret Goetz.

== Career ==
Savage was a soprano soloist who sang with the Boston Opera Company. and in a 1903 production of Orfeo ed Euridice in Angers. She toured with the New York Philharmonic in 1904, appearing in forty cities, in concerts with tenor Dan Beddoe and conductor Walter Damrosch. In 1905 she sang with the Savage Opera Company. "She always makes a splendid impression. Her voice in quality and range is phenomenal," according to a profile in Musical Courier magazine in 1904, which also discussed her appearance ("a fine figure and a most pleasing facial expression") and her "artistic temperament".

Savage sang in Montreal in 1906, including as a last-minute replacement soloist for Handel's Messiah. She and tenor Theodore van Yorx gave a concert together at Boston's Jordan Hall in 1907. She returned to the opera stage in 1909, appearing in La traviata and Faust at the German Opera House in Prague, and appearing as Mimi in La bohème in Boston late that year.

In 1913, Savage used the name "Rena Saville" when she was with the Zuro Opera Company. In 1914 she played Josephine in a "mammoth" production of H.M.S. Pinafore at the Hippodrome, complete with "real water, real sailors". In the 1920s, she was a church soloist in Florida.

== Personal life ==
Cutter married twice. She married fellow singer and voice coach Paul Savage in Italy in 1902; they divorced in 1915, the year she married Pierre LaJard Willis in New Jersey. The Willises also divorced. She lived with her mother in Los Angeles in the 1930s and 1940s. She died in 1949, in Los Angeles, at the age of 72.
