= James Savage (footballer) =

English footballer

Personal information
- Date of birth: 12 May 1876
- Place of birth: Withnell, England
- Position: Winger

Senior career*
Years	Team	Apps	(Gls)
18xx–1899	Nelson		
1899–1902	Burnley	36	(11)
1902–1903	Trawden Forest		
- * Club domestic league appearances and goals

James Savage (born 12 May 1876, date of death unknown) was an English professional footballer who played as a winger. He played in the Football League for Burnley, in addition to spells in non-league football with Nelson and Trawden Forest.
