= John Savage (surgeon) =

English surgeon (1770–1838)

John Savage (1770 – 1838) was an English naval surgeon and travel writer on the Antipodes. He was the author of Some account of New Zealand, based on his experiences aboard the Ferrett, which made several voyages to New Zealand.
