= Pat Savage (rugby league) =

Australian rugby league footballer

Personal information
- Full name: Patrick Savage

Playing information
- Position: Wing
Club
Years	Team	Pld	T	G	FG	P
1992–94	Brisbane Broncos	14	3	0	0	12
1996	Gold Coast Chargers	5	0	0	0	0
	Total	19	3	0	0	12

Pat Savage is an Australian former professional rugby league footballer who played for the Brisbane Broncos and Gold Coast Chargers.

Savage, a recruit from the North Queensland region, played at Brisbane as a winger. Most of his first-grade appearances came in the 1992 season and included a two try performance in Brisbane's round eight win over St. George. He lost his place in the side after round 22, with Brisbane going on to win the premiership over St. George in the grand final.

In 1996 he played a season of first-grade with the Gold Coast Chargers.
