= John Savage (author) =

Church of England clergyman and scholar (1673–1747)

The Reverend John Savage
- Rector of Clothall
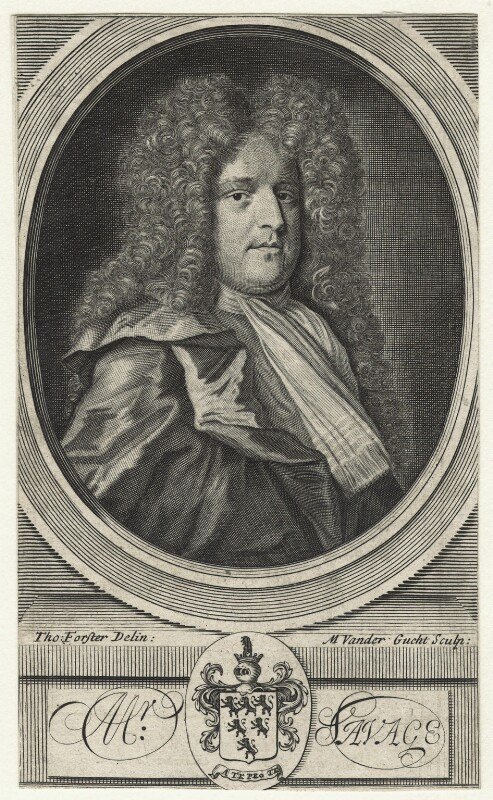
- Portrait engraved by Michael Vandergucht, after Thomas Forster (1702)

Personal details
- Born: 1673 Hertfordshire, England
- Died: 24 March 1747 (aged 72–73) Clothall, Hertfordshire, England
- Denomination: Anglican
- Education: Emmanuel College, Cantab. Christ Church, Oxon.
- Coat of arms

John Savage (1673–1747) was an English Anglican clergyman and author.

== Life ==
John Savage, born in 1673, was a native of Hertfordshire, and was elected a King's Scholar of Westminster School in 1687. Thence he was admitted on 13 February 1691 to Emmanuel College, Cambridge, as a pensioner, and he graduated B.A. in 1694 and M.A. in 1698. On 24 June 1707 he proceeded B.D. and D.D. from Christ Church, Oxford. On leaving Cambridge he travelled for eight years with James Cecil, 5th Earl of Salisbury, visiting nearly every country in Europe. Salisbury afterwards made him his chaplain, and on 31 January 1701 presented him to the living of Bigrave, Hertfordshire. This he resigned in 1708 for the more valuable benefice of Clothall in the same county, which he held till his death. On 31 March 1732 he also became lecturer at St. George's, Hanover Square.

Cole says that Savage was "a stately man, rather corpulent"; and Bishop Newton calls him "a lively, pleasant, facetious old man". He belonged to a celebrated social club founded at Royston soon after the Restoration, a former member of which, Sir John Hynde Cotton, writing to Gough in 1786, describes Savage as "a very jolly convivial priest". Savage was much devoted to his old school, Westminster. A white marble tablet, with Latin inscription, erected in 1750 in the east cloisters by the King's Scholars at their expense, attested his popularity there. The Earl of Salisbury also commemorated Savage's name by an inscription on the first foundation-stone of Peckwater Quadrangle, Christ Church, Oxford, laid by him on 26 January 1705.

Savage died at Clothall on 24 March 1747, from the consequences of a fall down the stairs of the scaffolding erected for Lord Lovat's trial in Westminster Hall. A portrait, engraved by Vandergucht from a painting by Thomas Forster, is prefixed to his History of Germany.

== Works ==
Savage published in 1701 an abridgment, in 2 volumes, 8vo, of Knolles and Rycaut's Turkish History, with dedication to Anthony Hammond, M.P. for Cambridge University. He wrote the first volume of A Compleat History of Germany … from its Origin to this Time, which appeared in 1702, and superintended the rest of the work, in which the best extant German and Spanish authorities are handled with discrimination. He also edited and continued Bernard Connor's History of Poland (2 volumes, 1698); issued in 1703 A Collection of Letters of the Ancients, 8vo; in 1704 two volumes of sermons; and in 1708 a poem in the Oxford Collection of Verses on the death of Prince George of Denmark. Foreign literature engaged much of his attention. Besides taking part in Thomas Brown's version of Scarron's works, and in the translation of Lucian (1711) Savage translated from the French the anonymous Memoirs of the Transactions in Savoy during this War, 1697, 12mo; from the Spanish, A. de Guevara's Letters, 1697, 8vo, and Balthasar Gracian's Oráculo Manual y Arte de Prudencia, 1702, 8vo, 1705, 1714; from the Italian, Moscheni's Brutes turned Criticks, 1695 (sixty satirical letters); and from Latin, Gerard Noodt's published orations, De Jure summi Imperii et Lege Regiâ, and De Religione ab Imperio jure gentium liberâ, 1708.

== Relations ==
William Savage, Master of Emmanuel College, was probably related to John Savage. Another John Savage, also of Emmanuel, was rector of Morcot, Rutland, and master of Uppingham School.

== Sources ==
- Nichols, John (1812). Literary Anecdotes of the Eighteenth Century. Vol. 2. London: Nichols, Son, and Bentley. pp. 141–142, 703.
- ——— (1815). Literary Anecdotes of the Eighteenth Century. Vol. 9. London: Nichols, Son, and Bentley. p. 492.
- ——— (1824). Illustrations of the Literary History of the Eighteenth Century. Vol. 4. London: John Nichols and Son. pp. 351, 717.
- This article incorporates text from a publication now in the public domain: Norgate, Gerald le Grys (1897). "Savage, John (1673-1747)". In Lee, Sidney (ed.). Dictionary of National Biography. Vol. 50. London: Smith, Elder & Co. pp. 340–341.
- Marshall, William (2004). "Savage, John (1673–1747), scholar and Church of England clergyman". Oxford Dictionary of National Biography. Oxford University Press. Retrieved 17 September 2022.
- The Gentleman's Magazine. 1747. Vol. 17. London: Edw. Cave. p. 154.
- The Gentleman's Magazine. 1813. Volume 83, Part 2. London: Nichols, Son, and Bentley. pp. 411–412.
