= Pat Savage =

Scottish footballer and trainer

Personal information
- Full name: Patrick Savage
- Date of birth: 19 November 1882
- Place of birth: Cowdenbeath, Scotland
- Date of death: 9 November 1969 (aged 86)
- Place of death: Cowdenbeath, Scotland
- Position: Goalkeeper

Senior career*
Years	Team	Apps	(Gls)
- Cowdenbeath Athletic
1905–1908	Cowdenbeath	4	(0)
1908–1910	Dunfermline Athletic		
1910–1911	Hearts of Beath		
1911–1912	St Bernard's		
1912–1914	King's Park		
1914–1919	Cowdenbeath	18	(0)
1915	→ Reading (guest)		
- Hearts of Beath
1921–1922	St Bernard's	2	(0)
- * Club domestic league appearances and goals

Patrick Savage (19 November 1882 – 9 November 1969) was a Scottish professional footballer who played as a goalkeeper in the Scottish League for Cowdenbeath, Dunfermline Athletic and St Bernard's. He also served as assistant trainer at King's Park.

== Personal life ==
Savage worked as a miner and his uncle James also played football as a full back for Cowdenbeath. In 1915, during the first 12 months of the First World War, he enlisted in the Fife and Forfar Yeomanry and his battalion would later become a member of the Black Watch. Savage saw action during the Mesopotamian campaign and on the Western Front. After the war, he returned to work as a miner and later as a barman.
