= Jimmy Savage =

American journalist

James R. Savage (September 9, 1910 – April 4, 1951) was a columnist who originated the "Tower Ticker" column in the Chicago Tribune in 1948 and wrote it until his death in 1951. He signed the column simply "Savage".

Savage was born in Chicago to a family long established there. He attended Northwestern University. He worked in show business, both in theater management, notably for Balaban and Katz (B&K), and as a writer. Despite being blind in one eye, he joined the Navy during World War II as a press relations officer, and rejoined B&K afterwards. He joined the Chicago Tribune in 1948.

He died in 1951 while covering the Academy Awards in Los Angeles.
