= Joel Hamilton =

American record producer, engineer and musician

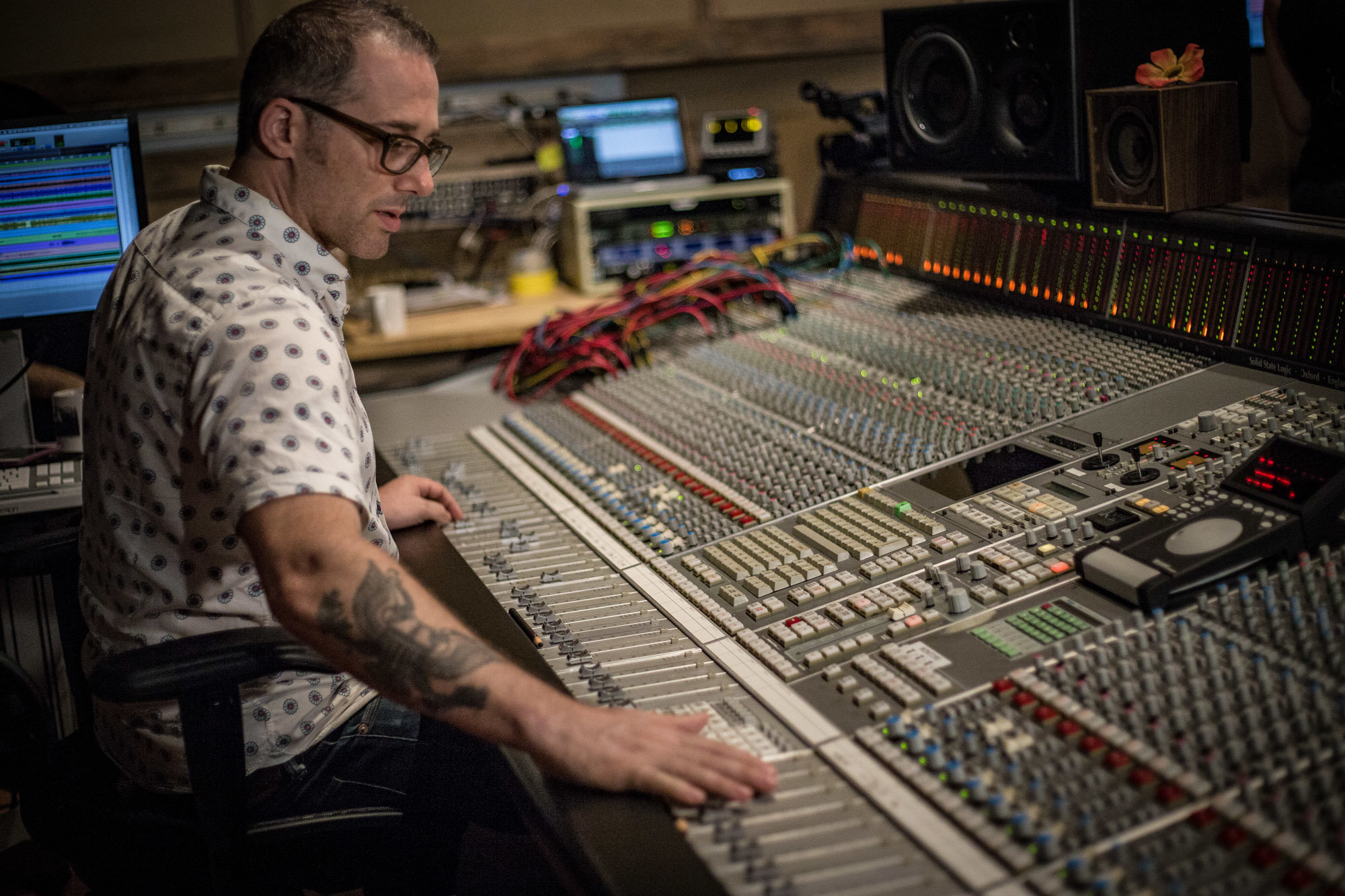

Joel Hamilton (born 1980) is an American Brooklyn-based record producer, audio engineer and musician. Hamilton performs as a musician for the band Book of Knots. He is also a producer and engineer at Studio G in Brooklyn, New York.

In the summer of 2014, Hamilton appeared as the host of a web series produced by Spotify and Bose named "Art of Sound", which focuses on the connection between the physical, technical and emotional sides of music and sound. He hosted many musicians and sound engineers to conduct experiments on a wide variety of sound-related topics.

Hamilton has been a guest speaker and panelist at: Nordic Music Week, Norway (2012 and 2013), Pot Luck Con., Tucson (2012), AES Latin America Conference (2011, 2019, 2022, 2023), and Tape Op Con., Tucson (2006).

== Credits ==
Hamilton mixed the posthumous Sparklehorse album Bird Machine, which is the first collection of new songs from the late Mark Linkous. Hamilton previously worked with Linkous on his 2001 breakthrough album It's a Wonderful Life & Dreamt for Light Years in the Belly of a Mountain which he engineered.

Hamilton produced and mixed three studio albums for alternative rock band Highly Suspect. The band’s debut album Mister Asylum was nominated for Best Rock Album at the 2015 Grammy Awards, and the song “Lydia” was nominated for the Grammy Award for Best Rock Song. From their second album The Boy Who Died Wolf, the song “My Name Is Human” was nominated for Best Rock Song at the subsequent award ceremony. Highly Suspect's third album MCID (2019) includes:

- "16”: charted #1 on the Billboard Rock Chart for three weeks
- "Tokyo Ghoul” featuring Young Thug
- "These Days” which charted #24 on the Billboard Rock Chart on April 4, 2020.

He produced and mixed Turkish mega-pop star Sertab Erner's rock band Oceans of Noise's self-titled debut EP in 2017. Hamilton also produced, mixed and co-wrote the English lyrics to "Ayla", the title track from the Turkish film Ayla-Daughter of War (2017) (nominated for an Academy Award for Best Foreign Film in 2017).

He produced and mixed Brkn Love's debut album for Universal Music, including the single "Shot Down”, which spent 10 weeks on the Billboard charts (peaking at #21 on September 21, 2019). He produced and mixed Norwegian band Violet Road's album Lines Across Light. This album includes the single "Monument”, which was featured in an NSB (Norwegian Rail) commercial and television campaign in 2018. He produced, engineered, and mixed the song "Og sangen kom fra havet” for artist Ingvild Koksvik, who won the Arts Council of Norway's work grant for songwriters in 2018. Hamilton engineered and mixed Aaron Neville's album Apache, released on Tell It/Kobalt in 2016; the album peaked on the Billboard chart at #38.

Hamilton's work also includes:

- Pretty Lights’ A Color Map of the Sun - engineering, mixing and additional production (nominated for Best Dance/Electronica Album at the 2014 Grammys)
- McCartney 3,2,1’ - lead recording engineer. Hulu TV series featuring Paul McCartney and Rick Rubin. Nominated for 3 Emmys.
- Puss n Boots’ No Fools, No Fun - engineering and mixing from Blue Note Records
- Tom Waits’ "Pray" - co-writing and production
- Bonobo’s Migration – engineering (nominated for Best Dance/Electronic Album and best Dance Recording 2017)
- "Blakroc"- Co-production, engineering and mixing with the Black Keys
- Gaby Moreno's "Postales"- Engineering and Mixing.
- Iggy Pop with The Plastic Ono Band "Waiting for the D Train" (song)- Mixing
- Bomba Estereo's "Elegancia Tropical"- Engineering and mixing (Nominated for Best Alternative Music Album at the Latin Grammys 2013)
- Matisyahu "Live at Stubb's, Volume 2"- Mixing
- Jolie Holland "The Living and The Dead" & "Pint of Blood"- Mixing
- Dub Trio "Another Sound Is Dying" & all other Dub Trio releases- Co-production, engineering and mixing
- Marc Ribot's Ceramic Dog "Party Intellectuals"- Production and mixing
- Inner Party System's self-titled album- Production, engineering and mixing
- Unsane "Blood Run"- Production, engineering and mixing
- The Giraffes- Production, engineering and mixing
- Elvis Costello "Beautiful" for the television series "House"- sound design engineering and programming
- Juiceboxxx's album "It's Easy to Feel Like Nobody When You're Living in the City" released on Dangerbird Records on February 28, 2020- Production and mixing
- Thick's album "5 Years Behind" released on Epitaph Records on March 6, 2020- Production and mixing
- Tyler Bryant and the Shakedown's album "Truth and Lies" released for Universal Records in 2019- Production and mixing
- Mixed the film Charlie Victor Romeo, which premiered as the official selection of the New Frontiers installation at The Sundance Film Festival in 2013.
