= 2017 in rock music =

This article summarizes the events related to rock music for the year of 2017.

== Notable events ==
=== January ===
- Highly Suspect's single "My Name is Human" is the number one song on the US Billboard Mainstream Rock Songs chart for three weeks of the month, for 8 weeks total in combining five weeks in 2017.
- Ghost's single "Square Hammer" tops the Billboard Mainstream Rock chart for two weeks. The song is their first to top the chart, and made them the first Swedish band to do so as well.
- You Me at Six's single "Take on the World" tops the UK Rock & Metal Singles chart, and was certified silver.
- AFI releases their tenth studio album AFI. It debuts at number 5 on the US Billboard 200 chart, selling 29,000 album equivalent units.
- Starset releases their second studio album, Vessels. It debuts at number 11 on the Billboard 200 chart, selling over 40,000 copies in the first half of the year.

=== February ===
- Green Day's single "Still Breathing" concurrently tops the Billboard Mainstream Rock, Alternative Songs, and Rock Airplay charts for a single week.
- Metallica's single "Atlas, Rise!" tops the Billboard Mainstream Rock chart for 2 weeks.
- Shinedown's single "How Did You Love?" tops the Billboard Mainstream rock chart, and stays there for 4 weeks.

=== March ===
- Breaking Benjamin's single "Never Again" tops the Billboard Mainstream Rock chart for 2 weeks. It is their fifth song to do so at the time.
- Metallica's 2016 album Hardwired... to Self-Destruct jumps up to number 2 on the Billboard 200 chart, largely due to a concert ticket/album buying promotional bundling for their 2017 touring. It stayed in the position for two weeks straight.
- Mastodon releases their seventh studio album, Emperor of Sand. The album debuts at number 7 on the Billboard 200 chart, and tops the Top Album Sales chart, selling 43,000 album equivalent units and 41,000 actual albums, respectively. The album is later nominated for a Grammy Award for Best Rock Album.
- Chris Cornell releases his final song prior to his death in May 2017, "The Promise". The song is later nominated for a Grammy Award for Best Rock Performance.

=== April ===
- Papa Roach's single "Help" tops the Billboard Mainstream Rock chart for 6 weeks straight.
- Incubus releases their eighth studio album, 8. It debuts at number 4 on the Billboard 200 chart, selling 52,000 album equivalent units.

=== May ===
- Seether's single "Let You Down" tops the Billboard Mainstream Rock chart for 4 weeks straight.
- Linkin Park's releases their seventh studio album, One More Light. It tops the Billboard 200 chart, selling 110,000 album equivalent units. It was also the band's sixth studio album to top the chart, a feat only nine other rock bands have ever done.
- Harry Styles releases his debut solo album, Harry Styles, an album noted for its 1970s and 1980s classic rock sound. It tops the Billboard 200 chart, selling 230,000 album equivalent units. It is also the top selling album of the week many other countries, including the United Kingdom, Belgium, Canada, The Czech Republic and Scotland.
- The Beatles 50th anniversary reissue of their 1967 album Sgt. Pepper's Lonely Hearts Club Band pushes the album back up to number 3 on the Billboard 200 chart.

=== June ===
- Stone Sour's single "Song #3" tops the Billboard Mainstream Rock chart for 4 weeks straight, their fourth song to top the chart.
- Nickelback releases their ninth studio album, Feed the Machine. It debuts at number 5 on the Billboard 200 chart, selling 47,000 album equivalent units.
- Stone Sour releases their sixth studio album Hydrograd. It debuts at number 8 on the Billboard' 200 chart, selling 33,000 album equivalent units, and tops the Billboard Hard Rock chart.

=== July ===
- The Foo Fighter's single "Run" tops the Billboard Mainstream Rock chart, and stays there for 4 weeks. The song is later nominated, and wins, the Grammy Award for Best Rock Song.

=== August ===
- Royal Blood's single "Lights Out" tops the Billboard Mainstream Rock chart, and stays there for 2 weeks. It is their second song to top the chart.
- Queens of the Stone Age release their seventh studio album, Villains. It debuts at number 3 on the Billboard 200 chart, selling 73,000 album equivalent units, and tops the Top Albums Sales chart.
- Brand New releases their fifth and final album, Science Fiction, their first new release in 8 years. The album tops the Billboard 200 chart, selling 58,000 album equivalent units, their only album to top the chart.
- Steven Wilson, frontman of long-running progressive rock bands Porcupine Tree and Blackfield, releases his highest charting album of his thirty-year career, his fifth solo album To the Bone. It debuts at number three UK all-format chart.
- It is announced that Starset has accumulated 1 billion views of their content on YouTube. The accomplishment is partially attributed to their popular single "Monster", which, was the second most-played song of Mainstream Rock radio for the year as of August.

=== September ===
- Greta Van Fleet's single "Highway Tune" tops the Billboard Mainstream Rock chart and stays there for 5 weeks. The band is one of few who top the chart with their very first single sent to the chart.
- The Foo Fighters release their ninth studio album, Concrete and Gold. It tops the all-format US Billboard 200 chart, selling 127,000 album equivalent units. It is the only hard rock album to top the US charts in 2017.

=== October ===
- Theory of a Deadman's single "Rx (Medicate)" tops the Billboard Mainstream Rock chart and stays there for six straight weeks.

=== November ===
- Nothing More's single "Go to War" tops the Mainstream Rock charts for the first week. It is their first song to top the chart. It also receives two Grammy Award nominations Best Rock Song and Best Rock Performance, for the 2018 Grammys, and a nomination for "Best Rock Song" for the iHeartRadio Music Awards.

=== December ===
- U2 release's their fourteenth studio album, Songs of Experience. The album tops the Billboard 200, selling 186,000 album equivalent units. It is the highest rock album debut of 2017, and the band's eighth album to top the chart, a feat few prior bands have done.
- The Foo Fighters' single "The Sky is a Neighborhood" tops the Billboard Mainstream Rock and Rock Airplay charts concurrently. It stays at the top of the Mainstream Rock chart for 4 weeks.
- Czech rock band Chinaski perform the last show with their classic line-up of Michal Malátný, František Táborský, Štěpán Škoch, Ondřej Škoch, Petr Kužvart, and Otakar Petřina Jr. The two Škochs, Kužvart, and Petřina are later replaced by Lukáš Pavlík, Tomi Okres and Jan Steinsdörfer.

=== Year end ===
- Metallica's Hardwired... to Self-Destruct is declared top rock album of 2017 by Billboard, selling 1.1 million copies over the course of 2017, and being the only rock band to have a platinum selling album in 2017.
- The Billboard Mainstream Rock Year End chart indicates that Stone Sour's "Song #3" is the most popular song on the chart for the year of 2017, followed by Highly Suspect's "Little One", and Starset's "Monster" in second and third respectively.
- Billboard staff vote Harry Styles's pop rock song "Sign of the Times" as the best rock song of 2017.

== Deaths ==
- January 22 – Jaki Liebezeit, 78, German drummer (Can)
- January 31
  - Deke Leonard, 72, Welsh rock guitarist (Man)
  - John Wetton, 67, English bassist (cancer)
- March 18 – Chuck Berry, pioneer in shaping the early sounds of rock and roll
- May 18 – Chris Cornell, 52, lead singer of Soundgarden and Audioslave (suicide)
- July 20 – Chester Bennington, 41, lead singer of Linkin Park (suicide)
- October 2 – Tom Petty, 66, of Tom Petty and the Heartbreakers (cardiac arrest)
- October 17 – Gord Downie, 53, lead singer of The Tragically Hip, after being diagnosed with brain cancer in 2015.
- October 20 – Boris Lindqvist, 76, Swedish rock singer (death announced on this date)
- November 7 – Pentti Glan, 71, Finnish-Canadian drummer (Alice Cooper, Lou Reed)
- November 18 - Malcolm Young, 64, Rhythm guitarist and co-founding member of Australian rock band AC/DC

== Band breakups ==
- Audioslave
- Black Sabbath
- H.I.M.
