= Marina Kazankova =

Russian actress and freediver

- Born: 4 August 1981 (age 45); Frunze, Soviet Union
- Citizenship: Italy
- Occupation: Actress
- Years active: 1999-present

Marina Kazankova (born 4 August 1981 in Frunze, USSR) is an international actress and freediver. She appeared in more than fifteen films since 1999.

Marina Kazankova was born on August 4, 1981, in Frunze, USSR (now Bishkek, Kyrgyzstan), in the family of a pilot.

She is known for her work in cinema and theatre. Marina has participated in performances at the Roman theatre "Glauco Mauri".

== Selected filmography ==
Film
Year	Title	Role	Notes
2001	Poisons or the World History of Poisoning	Lucrezia Borgia	
2011	6 Days on Earth	Elena	
2011	Soulless	Natalia Viktorovna	
2020	The Time Guardians	Olga, the artist	

TV
Year	Title	Role	Notes
2022	Trigger	instructor of pregnant women	
2006	Capri	Nancy	
2003-2004	Poor Nastya	Olga Kalinkovskaya	

Music videos
Year	Title	Artist	Album	Notes
2015	"Lydia"	Highly Suspect	Mister Asylum	
