= New Heavy =

Studio album by Dub Trio
- Released: May 23, 2006
- Studio: Studio G, Brooklyn, New York, U.S.
- Genre: Dub; punk rock
- Length: 40:12
- Label: ROIR
- Producer: Dub Trio; Joel Hamilton

Dub Trio chronology
Exploring the Dangers Of (2004)	New Heavy (2006)	Cool Out and Coexist (2007)

Singles from New Heavy
- 1. "Not Alone" Released: 2006

New Heavy is the second studio album by Dub Trio. It was released on ROIR on May 23, 2006. "Not Alone" features Mike Patton on vocals.

== Critical reception ==
Professional ratings
Review scores
Source	Rating
AllMusic	3.5/5 stars
Billboard	favorable
East Bay Express	favorable
Pitchfork	5.9/10
PopMatters	5/10 stars
Punknews.org	2.5/5 stars

Brian Howe of Pitchfork said, "For now, they're talented musicians welding durable dub onto tired post-hardcore with very mixed results." John Bergstrom of PopMatters commented that "New Heavy isn't just a noble undertaking, it's an ambitious one full of pitfalls. Ron Hart of Billboard wrote, "Dub Trio's attempts to fuse metal guitars and echodelic riddims fall right on the money in the studio." David Downs of East Bay Express called the album "Perfect for boozy barbecues, fast driving, and late-night living-room after-parties."

== Track listing ==
All tracks are written by Dub Trio, except lyrics on "Not Alone" written by Mike Patton.

No.	Title	Length
1.	"Illegal Dub"	3:18
2.	"Not Alone" (featuring Mike Patton)	5:06
3.	"Angle of Acceptance"	1:21
4.	"Table Rock Dub"	7:24
5.	"Jack Bauer"	2:23
6.	"One Man Tag Crew"	2:44
7.	"Yes You Can't"	1:13
8.	"Sunny I'm Kill"	2:54
9.	"Screaming at the Sea"	3:56
10.	"Cool Out and Coexist"	4:44
11.	"Lullaby for..."	5:06
Total length:		40:12

Notes

- The enhanced CD edition includes videos for "Illegal Dub" and "Casting Out the Nines (Live)".

== Personnel ==
Credits adapted from liner notes.

Dub Trio

- Stu Brooks – bass guitar, keyboards, effects, production
- DP Holmes – guitar, keyboards, effects, production
- Joe Tomino – drums, percussion, keyboards, melodica, effects, production

Additional personnel

- Mike Patton – vocals (on "Not Alone")
- Joel Hamilton – production, engineering, mixing
- Joseph Yoon – executive production
- Doug Henderson – mastering
- Richard Bloom – artwork
- Jason Fried – video
