= Brkn Love =

Canadian rock band

BRKN LOVE
- Origin: Toronto, Ontario, Canada
- Genres: Alternative rock
- Years active: 2018–present
- Label: Spinefarm Records
- Members: Justin Benlolo (vocals, guitar); Kyle Duke (guitar); Nick Katz (bass); Andres Valbuena (drums)
- Past members: Russel Holzman (drums)
- Website: www.brkn-love.com

BRKN LOVE is a Canadian alternative rock band from Toronto, formed in 2018.

== Background ==
Founded by Toronto singer and guitarist Justin Benlolo, who left school at the age of 16 to pursue music, moving first to New York City and then to Los Angeles. There, he recorded demos that caught the attention of producer Joel Hamilton (known for his work with Highly Suspect). Hamilton invited Benlolo to Brooklyn to record a debut album at Studio G, Hamilton’s space. The band's line-up was then completed with the acquisitions of guitarist Kyle Duke, Bassist Nick Katz, and drummer Russell Holzman, all hailing from New York City.

When asked about the band name, Benlolo said, "My manager and I made a list of my favourite albums and songs, and we kind of mixed and matched the front parts of some albums and the back words of some songs. Until we got to BRKN LOVE".

In March 2019, after a performance in New York City, BRKN LOVE signed with Finnish label Spinefarm Records. Their debut single, "Shot Down," reached number 11 on the Canadian Rock Charts. Throughout the summer and autumn of 2019, the band toured North America, supporting acts like Dinosaur Pile-Up and Pop Evil, and performed at the Aftershock Festival.

Their self-titled debut album, BRKN LOVE, was released on February 14, 2020, and was recognised by Loudwire as one of the 13 best debut albums of 2020.

Subsequent tours included dates with Royal Tusk in Canada and, in late 2021, with Monster Truck and Big Wreck.

In the Spring of 2022, BRKN LOVE toured the United States alongside '68, opening for Badflower. They released two EPs that year: Vol. 1 on June 10 and Vol. 2 on September 23. These were followed by their second studio album, Black Box, produced by Anton DeLost and released on November 4, 2022. The album compiled tracks from the earlier EPs along with three additional songs.

In October 2024, BRKN LOVE released the single "20/20 Vision", co-written with Queens of the Stone Age bassist Michael Shuman and produced by Anton DeLost. The track was featured on EA Sports' NHL 25 video game. Frontman Justin Benlolo described the song as quintessential BRKN LOVE, focusing on themes of nostalgia and the important of trusting one's decisions. The band supported the release with a Southeast U.S. tour in November 2024, alongside labelmates Dead Poet Society.

On March 28, 2025, BRKN LOVE released their third studio album, The Program, via Spinefarm Records. The album, produced by Anton DeLost, was inspired by Benlolo's extended stay in Charleston, South Carolina, where he found creative inspiration among new friends. The lead single, "Pulling Leeches," recorded in a single take at Foo Fighters' Studio 606, explores themes of shedding one's past and confronting parasitic relationships. Benlolo cited influences from bands like The White Stripes and The Black Keys for this track.

BRKN LOVE's music is characterized by gritty riffs and arena-sized hooks, drawing comparisons to bands like Soundgarden, Nirvana, and Wolfmother. Their sound embodies a blend of alternative rock influences with a modern edge, reflecting Benlolo's admiration for artists such as Kiss, Black Sabbath, Queens of the Stone Age, Foo Fighters, and Jeff Buckley.

== Band members ==
=== Current members ===
- Justin Benlolo - lead vocals, rhythm guitar (2019–present)
- Kyle Duke - lead guitar (2019–present)
- Nick Katz - bass (2019–present)
- Andres Valbuena - drums (2024-present)

=== Former Members ===
- Russell Holzman - drums (2019–2023)

== Discography ==
Brkn Love discography
- Studio albums: 3
- EPs: 2
- Singles: 6
- Music videos: 10

=== Studio albums ===
Title	Album details
Brkn Love	Released: 14 February 2020; Label: Spinefarm Records; Formats: CD, LP, DI
Black Box	Released: 11 April 2022; Label: Spinefarm Records; Formats: CD, LP, DI
The Program	Released: 28 March 2025; Label: Spinefarm Records; Formats: CD, LP, DI
"—" denotes a recording that did not chart or was not released in that territory.

=== Extended plays ===
- Vol. 1 (2022)
- Vol. 2 (2022)

=== Singles ===
Title	Year	Peak chart positions		Album	Link
Title	Year	CAN Main. Rock	US Main. Rock	Album	Link
"Shot Down"	2019	—	21	BRKN LOVE	
"Dead Weight"	2021	—	—	Black Box	
"Like a Drug"	2022	—	—	Black Box	
"20/20 Vision"	2024	—	—	The Program	
"Pulling Leeches"	2025	—	36	The Program	
"Diamonds"	2025	28	—	The Program	

=== Music videos ===
Song	Year	Director	Link
"Shot Down"	2019	Unknown	
"Papercuts"	2019	Nicholas Ferguson Lee	
"Flies in the Honey"	2020	Eric Ritcher	
"Crush"	2020	Unknown	
"Dead Weight"	2021	Unknown	
"Like a Drug"	2022	Unknown	
"Under the Knife"	2022	Unknown	
"Pulling Leeches"	2025	David Brodsky	
"Cruel"	2025	David Brodsky	
