= Kazankov =

Kazankov (Russian: Казанков) is a Russian masculine surname, its feminine counterpart is Kazankova. It may refer to

- Maksim Kazankov (born 1987), Russian and Turkmen football player
- Marina Kazankova (born 1981), Russian actress and freediver
- Sergey Kazankov (born 1972), Russian politician
- Sergey Kazankov (footballer) (born 1957), Soviet footballer
