= Discrimination against drug addicts =

Discrimination against people with substance use disorders is a form of discrimination against people who abuse drugs, alcohol, and other substances. In many countries, people with substance use disorders are often blamed for what is often seen as a moral failing but is increasingly being understood as a disease. People with substance use disorders are likely to be stigmatized, whether in society or healthcare. In the process of stigmatization, people with substance use disorders are stereotyped as having a particular set of undesirable traits, in turn causing other individuals to act in a fearful or prejudicial manner toward them.

== Background ==
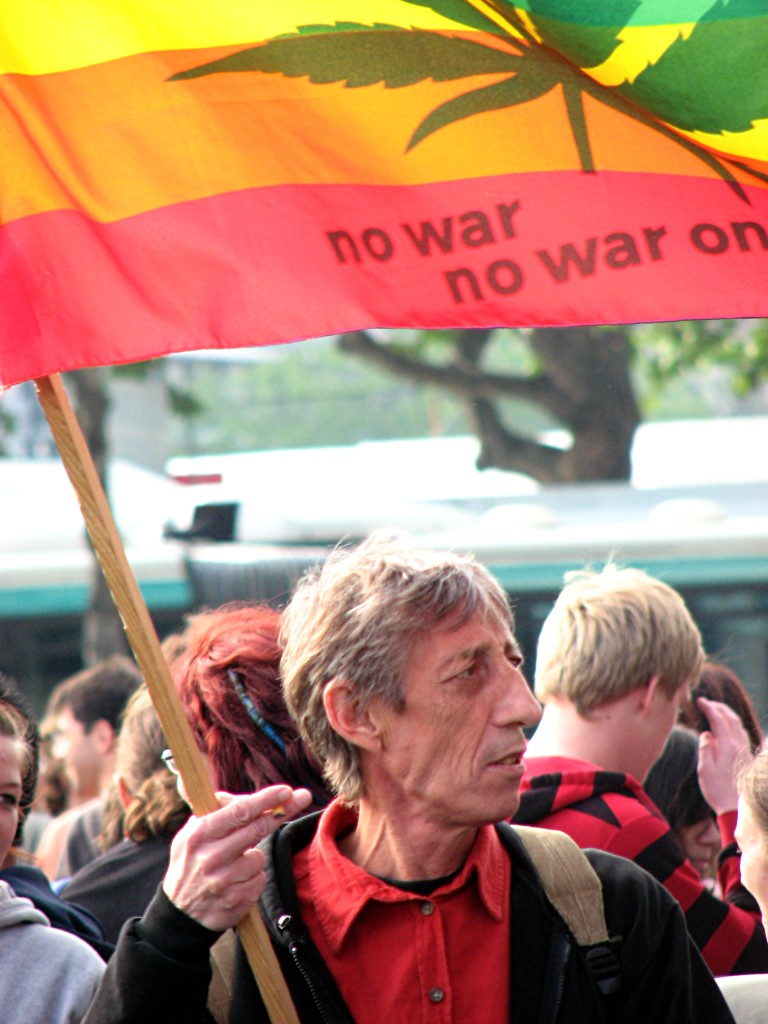
Global Marijuana March, Paris

Drug use discrimination is the unequal treatment people experience because of the drugs they use. People who use or have used illicit drugs may face discrimination in employment, welfare, housing, child custody, and travel, in addition to imprisonment, asset forfeiture, and in some cases forced labor, torture, and execution. Though often prejudicially stereotyped as deviants and misfits, most drug users are well-adjusted and productive members of society. Drug prohibitions may have been partly motivated by racism and other prejudice against minorities, and racial disparities have been found to exist in the enforcement and prosecution of drug laws. A 2003 study found that discrimination due to illicit drug use was the most commonly reported type of discrimination among Black and Latino drug users in New York City, two to three times more common than racial discrimination reports. People who use legal drugs such as tobacco and prescription medications may also face discrimination.

=== Individual factors ===
The term "addiction" usually correlates with a severe substance use disorder. Addiction is characterized by behaviour that is originally voluntary and reward-seeking that becomes compulsive over time, with a desire to avoid dysphoria or withdrawal rather than to experience the original positive effects associated. A person may become physiologically dependent and/or experience withdrawal. To fund their consumption, people may engage in illicit activities such as prostitution. People who use drugs may not be forthcoming about these practices and may also delay seeking medical treatment for sequelae related to substance use out of fear of stigma or legal consequences.

Clinicians use DSM-V-TR criteria to establish whether a person has a substance use disorder, which may be classified as mild, moderate, or severe. It may also be ruled out, as some people may use substances or may be prescribed controlled substances that have the potential for addiction, but never go on to develop a substance use disorder. Addictive substances include stimulants (caffeine, cocaine, amphetamine, methamphetamine, ephedra, etc.), sedatives/anxiolytics (benzodiazepines, barbiturates, Quaaludes, etc.), opioids (oxycodone, fentanyl, etc.), alcohol, nicotine/tobacco, cannabis, dissociatives (ketamine, nitrous oxide, etc.), certain hallucinogens (especially MDMA), hormones (testosterone), GHB, kratom, GABAergic agents (such as gabapentin), and more.

=== Institutional basis ===
Stigma in health care settings is perpetuated by limited education on substance use disorders in many healthcare professions. As a result, medical professionals may be unaware that their beliefs about and practices in treatment for people with substance use disorders are neither evidence-based nor factual. Healthcare professionals may hold biases similar to those of the general U.S. population, who often see substance use disorders as a moral failure rather than a chronic brain disease with psychosocial and genetic factors. Very few providers are certified in addiction treatment; addiction is often thought of as a subspecialty with providers having an initial certification in another specialty area, such as psychiatry. Drug-using patients are often aware of the possibility of poor medical care, "often interpreting physician inconsistency or hospital inefficiency as signs of intentional mistreatment."

Although 1 in 10 people in the United States will meet criteria for a substance use disorder in their lifetime, few will receive treatment. With the increasing number of adults that suffer from an addiction, only a few will receive treatment due to the complexity of health care systems. Most health care systems do not have insurance coverage for addiction recovery and many health care providers have little to no training in treating addiction. Some doctors do not feel comfortable treating addictions, due to their lack of knowledge and training of the topic. The American Society of Addiction Medicine reports that there are only 3,000 board-certified addiction specialist physicians in the United States while there are nearly 2 million people experiencing opioid addiction. The limited presence and access to comprehensive care for addiction poses a barrier for recovery for many, particularly those hailing from lower socioeconomic backgrounds.

==== Role of language ====
Language plays a key role in perpetuating or decreasing the stigmatization of people who use drugs. Healthcare provider circles are increasingly shifting towards person-first language to mitigate such stigma. For instance, as opposed to saying "former addict" or "reformed addict", the National Institute on Drug Abuse (NIDA) recommends "person in recovery" or "person who previously used drugs" to separate the problem from the individual. The NIDA similarly discourages the use of words such as "clean" or "dirty" to denote whether or not someone is actively using substances. Moreover, SUD policy reform advocates report language adjacent to SUD can misconstrue associated medical treatment practices which in turn poses barriers to expanded harm reduction efforts from being adopted. An example of this provided in a 2017 executive memorandum from The National Prevention Council was a recommendation to wean usage of "opioid substitution replacement therapy" which many believe falsely alludes that an individual is substituting their addiction for another (i.e. from heroin to methadone) to "opioid agonist therapy". Another term that is losing favor is "abuse", due to its negative connotations and its impact on patient care. Instead, the terms "misuse" for prescribed medications or "use" for illicit substances are used. Similarly, "user" is not used in favor of person-first language, such as "person with a substance use disorder", or "person who uses intravenously".

==== Drugs and HIV infection ====
Among people who use drugs intravenously, the incidence of HIV and hepatitis C infection is higher than among those who administer drugs through other routes. However, punitive and discriminatory measures against people who use drugs are not able to eliminate either the spread of drug addiction or HIV. A study from the Centers for Disease Control and Prevention’s National Center for HIV/AIDS, Viral Hepatitis, STD and TB Prevention found that around 90% of people who choose to inject drugs have missed prior opportunities for HIV testing that were provided. For this reason, annual screening for hepatitis C and HIV is recommended for patients who use drugs. In jurisdictions where harm reduction policies are active, people may use syringe service programs and/or use substances at safe consumption sites to minimize the risk of infection.

== Regional patterns ==
=== Africa ===
In Africa, approximately 28 million people use substances. This number is impacted by the rising availability of drugs that can be administered intraveneously such as heroin, cocaine, and methamphetamine. Socio-demographic factors are often primary determinants of the health status of people who use drugs. These factors contribute to an individual's drug use behaviors such as the sharing of needles and the solicitation of sex in exchange for police protection or more drugs. Nutritional status, family support, stigma/discrimination, adherence to medication, and recovery from addiction are also impacted by these socio-demographic factors. Research shows that the majority of people who use drugs transition from the use of non-soluble substances s to substances that can be used intravenously or end up using both simultaneously.

==== Kenya ====
In Kenya, as with other countries, there is a link between injection-related discrimination, mental health, physical health, and the quality of life for those who inject drugs. The rates of discrimination are linked to higher levels of psychological distress and risky behaviors. Women in Kenya account for 10% of people who use drugs. These women tend to experience typical discrimination faced by people who use drugs in addition to gender-related discrimination. Levels of discrimination are often higher for those that are also HIV positive.

==== Tanzania ====
The Tanzanian government initiated support for substance-dependence treatment rehabilitation in the late 20th century, with the Ministry of Health and Social Welfare administering the Treatment II center network to oversee this care. Treatment centers and harm reduction efforts in Tanzania have come into conflict with recent discourse from politicians, such as President John Magufuli, who established the nation's war on drugs in early 2017. Calling for the arrest of anyone involved in narcotics, Magufuli's stance is distinct from growing harm reduction pathways established in sub-Saharan Africa in the early 21st century. Tanzania's policing of injection drug use has pushed both consumers and traffickers deeper into the black market, with injection drug users consequently being more likely to be involved in sex work and other illicit trafficking, rather than engage in traditional employment opportunities which risk greater exposure. Populations that exist at this intersection, such as women sex workers who engage in injection drug use, are alienated from using risk reduction interventions due to fear of arrest.

Low-income, urban young men – the most likely demographic to be recruited into illicit substance trafficking due to limited legal economic opportunities – have been highly scrutinized under recent waves of drug criminalization. A record denoting arrest for such activity is associated with difficulty finding employment, which can ultimately limit upward economic mobility for these people and their communities.

A study published in the Review of African Political Economy notes that commerce and political corruption in Tanzania have promulgated crack cocaine consumption and flashblood practices, or blood sharing between substance users after recent injections, specifically among poor youth in urban centers.

=== Asia ===
==== India ====
Narcotic substance consumption is prohibited in India by the Narcotic Drugs and Psychotropic Substances Act inducted in 1985, which also levies punitive measures on adjacent activities such as the production or sale of such substances. Possession of a controlled substance can result in punishment ranging from a $136.21 USD fine and half a year imprisonment to $121,261 USD and twenty years imprisonment, depending on whether the amount identified is considered small or commercial. Certain crimes outlined by the Narcotic Drugs and Psychotropic Substances Bill are also eligible for the death penalty; while cases involving marijuana have been charged with capital punishment in the past, they tend to be successfully appealed in higher courts. This legislation is heavily influenced by a coordinated United Nations effort throughout the latter twentieth century to stymie international drug trafficking.

According to the International Drug Policy Consortium, India's Narcotics Control Bureau, which implements the Narcotic Drugs and Psychotropic Substances Act, has encountered criticism for the legislation's stringent measures limiting access to pain-relief medication, particularly the prescription of opiates for post-operative patients. Bill revisions in response have expanded access to such substances, like methadone, to be distributed through recognized care providers. Members of parliaments have subsequently pushed for expanded bill protections for marijuana use, which has not gained traction. Language cited as demeaning within the 2012 National Policy on Drugs and Psychotropic Substances regarding harm reduction pipelines such as clean needle programs, referring to such as "shooting galleries," have posed barriers to preventing comorbidities such as HIV which are prevalent among people who inject drugs in India. This poses an issue in states such as Punjab, where over 20% of people who inject drugs are also infected with HIV.

==== Philippines ====
In the Philippines, the government's war on drugs has led to allegations of killings and other human rights violations against those suspected of using, producing, or selling drugs by the Philippine National Police. This has led the United Nations Human Rights Council to adopt a resolution urging the Philippine government to set up an investigation into mass killings during the war on drugs.

==== Vietnam ====
Drug control strategy in modern Vietnam was first formally introduced in 1990 around the cause of eradicating "social evils," in reference to substance use. Such policies were inspired by the UN, specifically its Single Convention on Narcotic Drugs and Convention on Psychotropic Substances. Ordinances and violation measures were propositioned by the Vietnamese National Assembly in this legislation to mandate compulsory treatment for substance users, rather than subject them to prison. High rates of enrollment in mandatory treatment centers has resulted in a tendency for there to be more patients at treatment centers than can be handled, thus limiting access to rehabilitation for these individuals. Harm reduction measures, such as providing access to clean needles and condoms, have been introduced throughout the 2000s at a national level to address the prevalence of HIV and hepatitis C among drug users. Inconsistencies between the Ordinance on HIV/AIDS, which outlines such harm reduction practices, and the Drug Law of 2000, which prohibits the distribution of materials like needles, has it difficult for provinces to adopt harm reduction institutions like syringe exchanges.

While Vietnamese policy leaders generally veer towards addressing substance use as a medical issue, rather than criminal activity, having decriminalized many substances since 2009, the Ordinance of Administrative Violation continues to classify illicit substance consumption as a crime. Consequently, at a local level, substance users remain eligible to be charged by law enforcement and subjected to forced labor treatment centers that are comparable to detention. Thus, many substance users do not access harm reduction institutions out of fear of being identified by law enforcement and placed in these conditions.

=== Europe ===
==== Sweden ====
Narcotic substance use is criminalized in Sweden, with drug offenses holding punishments ranging from fines to six months imprisonment. Law enforcement is permitted to conduct urine testing based on suspicion, rather than requiring a public disturbance. This protocol is justified by lawmakers as a way to expand early intervention, but legal advocates have challenged such practices for infringing upon personal freedoms. Diversion to court-ordered treatment programs rather than criminalization has been expanded in response during the early 21st century. However, there are disparities in representation in such programs. For example, people who use drugs found in violation who belong to the top third of the Swedish wealth distribution are twice as likely to be admitted into a treatment program rather than imprisoned compared to people who committed a similar offense but belong to the bottom two-thirds of the wealth bracket. Moreover, while those who use drugs can apply to their local welfare administrator for rehabilitative services, this process is selective despite being less costly than long-term imprisonment for an associated drug-related crime.

Sweden has faced criticism for having harsher drug policies and less accessible rehabilitative programs for people who use drugs than peer Nordic nations which are moving towards drug liberalization. Many cite this for why Sweden has rising substance-related mortality in the 21st century, with 157 overdose deaths in 2006 compared to the Netherlands which had a little over a hundred during that year despite having a population close to double the size. Zero-tolerance policies are also in place for those who drive under the influence of an illicit substance.

=== North America ===
==== Canada ====
In Vancouver, Canada, there have been efforts to reduce opioid-related deaths. An article published by the Canadian Medical Association Journal discusses new efforts to create safe injection sites for people struggling with opioid addiction. Vancouver politicians created these sites for people to safely use drugs that they are addicted to without the risk of infection or hostile police encounters. These safe injection sites provide sterilized needles to limit the reuse of needles that lead to the spread of AIDS and other diseases. Safe injection sites, sometimes called supervised consumption sites (SCS), are a form of harm reduction which is a highly studied approach to public health issues. Despite widespread protest, all supervised consumption sites in Alberta and Ontario have been shut down as of 2026 by the conservative governments.

==== United States ====
The Prison Policy Initiative cites that the criminalization of drug use in the United States can limit personal daily activities for those who may use substances, even if it is done in a safe, recreational manner.

The war on drugs, which formalized in the 1970s with the Nixon administration, has disparately affected communities of color in the United States. Substantial punitive measures exist for illicit possession, whether that be in the context of use, trafficking, or selling, with length of incarceration scaling up with repeat offenses. Sentences can go up to life without parole for third-time offenses related to opioids such as fentanyl. Three-quarters of those imprisoned for fentanyl today are people of color, which directly corresponds to Black and Latin populations being disproportionately policed for drug-related crimes. This additionally infringes upon voting eligibility among people who use drugs, as more extreme drug charges hold felony status which revokes voting rights in a majority of states. Drug criminalization also operates within the deportation pipeline in the U.S., with drug charges making all individuals without citizenship eligible for deportation. Despite recreational use of cannabis being legal in 24 states as of 2023, this includes marijuana-related charges which have constituted over ten thousand deportations from 2012 to 2013, often severing families and communities. While statewide measures to legalize marijuana have gained traction throughout the 2010s and 2020s, individuals of color have been less likely to receive post-carceral clemency for these charges due to barriers to legal advocacy.

Human rights advocates have criticized the use of demeaning language regarding the condition in criminal litigation to leverage character assault against defendants or victims who have or are presumed to have the condition. A prominent example of this is the trial of Derek Chauvin, the former Minneapolis police officer convicted of murdering George Floyd, whose legal defense asserted substance use as a potential cause of death, rather than the asphyxiation which the jury found was caused by Chauvin.

In the U.S., employers and educational institutions may legally discriminate against people who are currently using based on the results of their drug screens. Otherwise, the Americans with Disabilities Act protects people with a prior history of substance use or who are receiving treatment. Employers may elect to administer drug screens at random, upon suspicion, on a routine basis, and before employment as a prerequisite as part of a zero-tolerance policy. However, according to the Rehabilitation Act of 1973, employers are supposed to ensure that people with alcohol use disorder and substance use disorders receive needed treatment and reasonable accommodations. The lack of job opportunities and treatment for people with substance use disorders may result in relapses or jail time . A study on the HIV status of people who inject drugs in San Francisco found that the HIV rate in those individuals 64.4% was 2009 and 80.5% in 2015, demonstrating an increase by 16.1%.

== See also ==
- Cognitive liberty – Freedom of an individual to control their own mental processes
- Drug liberalization – Process of reducing drug prohibition laws
- Legalisation of marijuana
