= Rx (Medicate) =

Single by Theory of a Deadman

from the album Wake Up Call
- Released: July 27, 2017
- Recorded: 2016
- Studio: Kensaltown (London)
- Genre: Pop rock
- Length: 3:53
- Label: 604; Roadrunner; Atlantic
- Songwriters: Tyler Connolly; Dave Brenner; Dean Back; Joey Dandeneau
- Producer: Martin Terefe

Theory of a Deadman singles chronology
| "Cold Water" (2017) | "Rx (Medicate)" (2017) | "Straight Jacket" (2018) |

Music video
- "Rx (Medicate)" on YouTube

"Rx (Medicate)" is a song performed by Canadian rock band Theory of a Deadman, a track on their sixth studio album, Wake Up Call (2017). The song's lyrics were co-written by all four members of the band and address the prescription drug abuse epidemic occurring in North America. It was produced by Martin Terefe and recorded at Terefe's Kensaltown Studios in London. Along with the group's usual hard rock sound, the song uses elements of pop and country music genres. The band's transition into the pop genre has been associated with lead singer Tyler Connolly's newly acquired piano-playing ability, which forced a change in his songwriting style.

"Rx (Medicate)" was released alongside its music video on July 27, 2017, as the lead single from Wake Up Call and served as an instant download on pre-orders of the album. It received mixed reviews from music critics and was praised for being socially aware but criticized for aspects of its music and lyrics. The single became Theory of a Deadman's third single to top the Billboard U.S. Mainstream Rock chart, and was certified 4× platinum by Music Canada and 3× platinum by the Recording Industry Association of America. It earned the band a No. 1 Song Award from the Society of Composers, Authors and Music Publishers of Canada (SOCAN) and was nominated for "Rock Song of the Year" at the 2018 iHeartRadio Music Awards.

Theory of a Deadman partnered with Shatterproof, a nonprofit organization focused on education about alcohol and drug dependence, helping addicts' families, and reducing the stigma associated with drug abuse. At live concerts, the band encourage their audience to seek help if they are battling addiction and invite their fans to share their personal stories. They also sell lapel pins bearing the song's title to benefit Shatterproof at their concerts.

== Recording and release ==
"Rx (Medicate)" was co-written by all four members of Theory of a Deadman and was produced by Martin Terefe. Wake Up Call is the first album on which the band collaborated with Terefe rather than Howard Benson, who produced their previous four albums. The song was recorded at Terefe's Kensaltown Studios in London and was mixed by Oskar Winberg, while engineering was done by George Murphy and Bobby Shin.

The single was released alongside its music video on July 27, 2017; the same day, Theory of a Deadman announced the name of their pending album. It was included as an instant download with pre-orders of Wake Up Call, which were accepted the next day. According to lead singer Tyler Connolly, the song was originally titled "Rx" but the band decided to change it after finding out fans were searching for a song called "Medicate" upon its release. On November 3, 2017, the band released a "symphonic acoustic" version of the song that included an acoustic and orchestral background.

== Composition and lyrics ==
"Rx (Medicate)"
A 23-second sample of the introduction of "Rx (Medicate)", as well as the beginning lyrics of the first verse performed by lead singer Tyler Connolly. It features an acoustic guitar riff and a distinct whistling tune, also performed by Connolly.

The lyrics of the single discuss the opioid epidemic that has affected North America, particularly the United States. The first part of the track's chorus consists of Connolly singing, "I am so freaking bored / Nothing to do today". Connolly said the chorus had been written before the rest of the song; he told iHeartRadio he was "bored and sitting around", and told Billboard, "I probably could have talked about anything and made the song silly and stupid". The chorus shifts into more serious subject matter, finishing with the lyrics, "I guess I'll sit around and medicate". The decision to write about drug abuse came after the death of a friend's wife, who took a cocktail of pills. Connolly said he wanted to be sure the lyrics did not convey the message that it is "cool to be high" or that the band were taking advantage or "poking fun" at issues surrounding substance abuse. Further inspiration came from Connolly's experience of seeking therapy following his divorce in 2010; he told Billboard, "...the first thing [the therapist] said was, 'I want to put you on some beta blockers or some sort of anti-depressant stuff' and I'm like, 'No! No way! What? How is that the first thing you want to do?'" These experiences motivated Connolly to write about society's over-dependence on prescription drugs; he said, "I just feel like something’s wrong and I felt like the song needed to be written and people needed to hear it. It seems like every week something terrible is happening".

The music of "Rx (Medicate)" contains an acoustic guitar riff, a distinctive whistling tune performed by Connolly, the sound of strings in the background, and elements of country music. Classic Rock called the track "an atmospheric piece of acoustic pop-rock", and Billboard and Loudwire both said it leans more towards the pop genre rather than the band's usual hard-rock sound. This has been attributed to Connolly's learning to play the piano, which he said forced him to write music differently. He rejected the notion that he was abandoning rock and said the song's change of musical direction had occurred naturally.

== Critical reception ==
James Christopher Monger of AllMusic called "Rx (Medicate)" an "opioid crisis anti-anthem" and one of the songs on the record that felt "rooted in the present", and Alternative Addiction called it—along with other tracks on the album—"ridiculously fun". In less enthusiastic critiques of Wake Up Call, Über Röck's Jonni D criticized the single, stating that the "auto-tuned whistling hooks wreak aural havoc". Allen J. Miller from Cryptic Rock said the song sounds socially aware but accused Connolly of "lazy songwriting" that seems to "glorify addiction rather than crusade against it" because of the lyrics in the bridge: "Your friends are high right now ... And no one’s ever coming down", but added that Connolly's lyrics have often been misinterpreted.

Connolly acknowledged the song has drawn "some pushback from fans", but the band has also received positive reception at live performances. Guitarist Dave Brenner supported his statement, saying, "You see fans, like, singing with tears strolling down their face. It's crazy." Connolly said he felt this was the "most important song" the band has ever written; bassist Dean Back stated, "It’s looking like it’s the biggest song of our career right now".

== Commercial performance and recognition ==
In the band's native Canada, "Rx (Medicate)" spent five weeks on the Billboard Canadian Hot 100 chart, peaking at number 86, and reached number four on the Canada Rock airplay chart. In the United States, the single debuted at number 32 on the Billboard US Mainstream Rock chart in August 2017. In its tenth week, the single peaked at number one, where it stayed for six consecutive weeks. This made it Theory of a Deadman's third song, following "Bad Girlfriend" and "Lowlife", to top this particular chart. Although it did not appear on the Billboard Hot 100, the song peaked at number 10 on the Bubbling Under Hot 100 chart, and climbed to number four on both the Hot Rock Songs chart and Rock Digital Songs chart. On the Rock Airplay chart, "Rx (Medicate)" peaked at number eight and reached number 28 in its seventh week on the Alternative Songs chart. The song appeared on the Billboard Year-End charts for Hot Rock Songs and Mainstream Rock at the end of 2017, reaching positions 27 and 25, respectively.

The single was certified 2× platinum by Music Canada in 2021, 3× platinum by the Recording Industry Association of America in 2022, and gold by Recorded Music NZ in 2024. "Rx (Medicate)" earned Theory of a Deadman a "No. 1 Song Award" from the Society of Composers, Authors and Music Publishers of Canada (SOCAN) and was nominated for "Rock Song of the Year" at the 2018 iHeartRadio Music Awards, losing to Foo Fighters' "Run".

== Music video ==
The music video for "Rx (Medicate)" was filmed in Los Angeles by director Maria Juranic. The video's main narrative focuses on Rose, a teenage girl who is selling her own prescription drugs to financially support her sick mother. Scenes of Rose stopping at various homes to deliver the drugs alternate with scenes of the people who are affected by the drugs she sells. These are interspersed with clips of the band driving through the city in a 1972 Cadillac Eldorado convertible. At one point, the group and Rose cross paths at an intersection.

== Partnership with Shatterproof ==
"If you’re going to release a song like this, you have to do more than just have an opinion and complain that nobody is doing anything [about] it. Our contribution goes beyond that."

—Tyler Connolly

In the wake of the song's release, the band partnered with the nonprofit organization Shatterproof, to raise awareness about addiction and to form a connection with their fans. Shatterproof focuses on removing the stigma often attached to drug and alcohol dependence and supports affected families and addicts in recovery and treatment programs. Following live performances of "Rx (Medicate)", the organization's website is displayed on a large screen behind the band as they encourage others to seek help if they feel they are battling addiction. Fans are invited to share their stories on faux prescription pads found at merchandise booths at the band's concerts and at Shatterproof's website. Lapel pins that say "Theory Rx" are sold at live events; proceeds from their sale are donated to Shatterproof.

== Credits and personnel ==
Credits adapted from the liner notes of Wake Up Call and AllMusic.

Theory of a Deadman

- Tyler Connolly – writer, vocals, guitar, whistle
- Dave Brenner – writer, guitar, backing vocals
- Dean Back – writer, bass, backing vocals
- Joey Dandeneau – writer, drums, backing vocals

Additional musicians

- David Angell – violin
- Monisa Angell – viola
- David Davidson – violin
- Carole Rabinowitz – cello
- Nikolaj Torplarsen – piano

Production

- Martin Terefe – producer
- George Murphy – engineer
- Bobby Shin – engineer
- Oskar Winberg – mixer
- Ted Jensen - mastering

Location

- Recorded at Kensaltown Studios in London, England

== Charts ==
=== Weekly charts ===
| Chart (2017) | Peak position |
|---|---|
| Canadian Hot 100 (Billboard) | 86 |
| Canada Rock (Billboard) | 4 |
| US Bubbling Under Hot 100 Singles (Billboard) | 10 |
| US Hot Rock Songs (Billboard) | 4 |
| US Mainstream Rock (Billboard) | 1 |

=== Year-end charts ===
| Chart (2017) | Position |
|---|---|
| US Hot Rock Songs (Billboard) | 27 |
| US Mainstream Rock (Billboard) | 25 |

== Certifications ==
| Region | Certification | Certified units/sales |
|---|---|---|
| Canada (Music Canada) | 4× Platinum | 320,000^{‡} |
| New Zealand (RMNZ) | Gold | 15,000^{‡} |
| United States (RIAA) | 3× Platinum | 3,000,000^{‡} |
^{‡} Sales+streaming figures based on certification alone.
