= Bloodfeather =

Single by Highly Suspect

from the album Mister Asylum
- Released: November 17, 2015
- Genre: Alternative rock; hard rock; blues rock; grunge
- Length: 3:54
- Label: 300
- Songwriter: Highly Suspect
- Producer: Joel Hamilton

Highly Suspect singles chronology
"Lydia" (2015)	"Bloodfeather" (2015)	"Serotonia" (2016)

"Bloodfeather" is a song by American rock band Highly Suspect. The song was released as the second single from the band's debut studio album Mister Asylum in November 2015.

"Bloodfeather" peaked at #5 on the Billboard Mainstream Rock chart on February 27, 2016 and a spent a total of 20 weeks on the chart.

== Music video ==
The song's music video was conceptualized and directed by TS Pfeffer. The video premiered on March 16, 2016 through Interview Magazine.

== Charts ==
Chart (2016)	Peak position
US Mainstream Rock (Billboard)	5
US Alternative Songs (Billboard)	37
US Rock Airplay (Billboard)	21

== Certifications ==
Certifications for "Bloodfeather"
Region	Certification	Certified units/sales
New Zealand (RMNZ)	Gold	15,000^{‡}
^{‡} Sales+streaming figures based on certification alone.

== Personnel ==
- Johnny Stevens – vocals, guitar
- Rich Meyer – bass
- Ryan Meyer – drums
