= The Boy Who Died Wolf =

Studio album by Highly Suspect
- Released: November 18, 2016
- Recorded: May – September 2016
- Genre: Alternative rock; blues rock; punk blues; grunge
- Length: 43:11
- Label: 300; Atlantic
- Producer: Joel Hamilton

Highly Suspect chronology
Mister Asylum (2015)	The Boy Who Died Wolf (2016)	MCID (2019)

Singles from The Boy Who Died Wolf
- 1. "Serotonia" Released: February 29, 2016; 2. "My Name Is Human" Released: September 7, 2016; 3. "Little One" Released: May 2, 2017

Professional ratings
Aggregate scores
Source	Rating
Metacritic	64/100
Review scores
Source	Rating
AllMusic	3/5 stars
Alternative Press	3.5/5 stars
Clash	6/10

The Boy Who Died Wolf is the second studio album by American rock band Highly Suspect. It was recorded in Bogotá, Colombia and Brooklyn, New York. The album's lead single "My Name Is Human" reached No. 1 on Billboard's Mainstream Rock chart, the band's first single to do so, and was nominated for Best Rock Song at the 59th Annual Grammy Awards. The album's second single, "Little One", had reached number 2 on the same chart as of October 2017.

== Track listing ==
All tracks are written by Highly Suspect, except where noted.

No.	Title	Writer(s)	Length
1.	"My Name Is Human"		4:19
2.	"Look Alive, Stay Alive"		2:10
3.	"Little One"		4:02
4.	"For Billy"	Highly Suspect, Joel Hamilton	3:39
5.	"Serotonia"		5:54
6.	"Postres"		2:32
7.	"Send Me an Angel" (Real Life cover)	David Sterry, Richard Zatorski	4:29
8.	"Viper Strike"		3:19
9.	"F.W.Y.T."	Highly Suspect, Joel Hamilton	3:29
10.	"Chicago"		4:24
11.	"Wolf"		6:56
Total length:			44:18

== Personnel ==
- Johnny Stevens – guitar, vocals, synthesizer, piano
- Rich Meyer – bass, backing vocals
- Ryan Meyer – drums, backing vocals

== Accolades ==
Publication	Accolade	Year	Rank
Loudwire	20 Best Rock Albums of 2016	2016	1
Loudwire	The Best Hard Rock Album of Each Year Since 1970	2024	1

== Charts ==
Chart (2016)	Peak position
New Zealand Albums (RMNZ)	10
US Billboard 200	28
US Top Alternative Albums (Billboard)	1
