= Peeping Tom (Peeping Tom album) =

Studio album by Peeping Tom
- Released: May 30, 2006
- Recorded: 2004–2005
- Genres: Alternative rock; electronic; trip hop
- Length: 44:03
- Label: Ipecac
- Producers: Mike Patton; Dan the Automator; Amon Tobin; Jel; Odd Nosdam; Massive Attack; Dub Trio

Singles from Peeping Tom
- 1. "Mojo" Released: 2006

Peeping Tom is the only studio album by American band Peeping Tom. It was released by Ipecac Recordings on May 30, 2006. It peaked at number 103 on the Billboard 200 chart.

== Production ==
In 2000, Mike Patton conceived Peeping Tom. It is a tribute to Michael Powell's 1960 film Peeping Tom. The album was created by swapping song files through the mail with collaborators such as Norah Jones, Kool Keith, and Massive Attack, among others. It took almost six years to complete the album.

== Musical style and influences ==
The musical style of Peeping Tom encompasses elements of rock, heavy metal, experimental pop, pop, trip hop, alternative hip-hop, underground hip-hop and hip-hop.

Patton said of the album; "This is my version of pop music. In a way, this is an exercise for me: taking all these things I've learned over the years and putting them into a pop format."

== Release ==
"Mojo" was released as a single from the album. It is accompanied by a music video, directed by Matt McDermitt and featuring appearances by Danny DeVito, Mark Hoppus, Rachel Hunter, and Dan the Automator.

The album was released by Patton's own record label Ipecac Recordings on May 30, 2006. The vinyl version was released by Anticon on August 28, 2006.

== Critical reception ==
Professional ratings
Aggregate scores
Source	Rating
Metacritic	64/100
Review scores
Source	Rating
AllMusic	4.5/5 stars
Alternative Press	4/5
IGN	8.4/10
Now	2/5
The Observer	3/5 stars
Pitchfork	6.2/10
PopMatters	7/10 stars
Rolling Stone	3/5 stars
Slant Magazine	1/5 stars
Stylus Magazine	D

At Metacritic, which assigns a weighted average score out of 100 to reviews from mainstream critics, the album received an average score of 64 based on 22 reviews, indicating "generally favorable reviews".

David Raposa of Pitchfork gave the album a 6.2 out of 10, saying: "For all the great ideas and fantastic moments sprinkled throughout Peeping Tom, it turns out that Mike Patton's idea of pop is as uncompromising as his other musical notions." Cammila Collar of AllMusic gave the album 4.5 stars out of 5, calling it "Patton's most accessible work since Mr. Bungle's 1999 album California."

== Track listing ==
No.	Title	Writer(s)	Length
1.	"Five Seconds" (featuring Odd Nosdam)	Mike Patton	4:20
2.	"Mojo" (featuring Rahzel and Dan the Automator)	Patton, Dan the Automator	3:40
3.	"Don't Even Trip" (featuring Amon Tobin)	Patton	5:46
4.	"Getaway" (featuring Kool Keith)	Patton, Keith Thornton	3:22
5.	"Your Neighborhood Spaceman" (featuring Jel and Odd Nosdam)	Patton	5:45
6.	"Kill the DJ" (featuring Massive Attack)	Patton	4:09
7.	"Caipirinha" (featuring Bebel Gilberto)	Patton	2:46
8.	"Celebrity Death Match" (featuring Kid Koala)	Patton	3:42
9.	"How U Feelin?" (featuring Doseone)	Patton	2:44
10.	"Sucker" (featuring Norah Jones)	Patton, Dan the Automator	2:33
11.	"We're Not Alone (Remix)" (featuring Dub Trio)	Patton, Stu Brooks, DP Holmes, Joe Tomino	5:10

== Charts ==
Chart performance for Peeping Tom
Chart (2006)	Peak position
Australian Albums (ARIA)	12
Finnish Albums (Suomen virallinen lista)	31
French Albums (SNEP)	115
Norwegian Albums (VG-lista)	22
US Billboard 200	103
US Heatseekers Albums (Billboard)	1
US Independent Albums (Billboard)	3
