= Little One (Highly Suspect song) =

Single by Highly Suspect

from the album The Boy Who Died Wolf
- Released: April 26, 2017
- Recorded: 2016
- Genre: Hard rock
- Length: 4:02
- Label: 300
- Songwriters: Johnny Stevens; Rich Meyer; Ryan Meyer
- Producer: Joel Hamilton

Highly Suspect singles chronology
| "My Name Is Human" (2016) | "Little One" (2017) | "16" (2019) |

"Little One" is a song by American rock band Highly Suspect. It was their second single off their second studio album, The Boy Who Died Wolf. As of October 2017, it peaked at number 2 on the Billboard US Mainstream Rock Songs chart.

== Background ==
The song "Little One" dates back to 2015, where the band would perform the then-unreleased track live at concerts while touring in support of their first studio album, Mister Asylum. The band noted that the song was played live with such frequency that audience members would have the lyrics memorized, despite no studio version in existence. The studio version of the song was first premiered in October 2016, in promotion of their then-upcoming second studio album, The Boy Who Died Wolf. The song was later released as the second single from the album, along with a music video, on April 26, 2017.

== Themes and composition ==
Billboard described the song as an "anthemic love song". Frontman Johnny Stevens described that, like all of the songs from the album The Boy Who Died Wolf, the lyrics were self-referential to things the band had gone through in the years leading up to the album's release. He described it as a "heartbreak song", stating that the lyrics "Hey, little one, I'm so scared of what this could have been/ I know that today I lost my only friend" refer to his own accidental self-sabotage of a woman he was romantically involved with in the past.

== Music video ==
The song's music video refers to the same thematic material as the song lyrics, involving a character's reaction to lost love. The video stylistically takes after a 1980s themed cop drama, frontman Johnny Stevens, distraught by lost love, goes about a retail store, trashing many of its items, while bassist Rich Meyer and drummer Ryan Meyer play cops who are in his pursuit. The video culminates with the policeman capturing Stevens and dragging him out of the store, just as the woman he was distraught about, Madison Parker, arrives, and looks at Stevens, without interest. The scene was meant to be symbolic of the real life events; Parker is the real life woman Stevens wrote the song about, while the cops (played by band members) dragging him away symbolizes the band getting in the way of the relationship. The band said the video's style was made out of inspiration of videos like Michael Jackson's "Thriller" music video, with the band preferring videos with plots over basic performance-based videos.

== Reception ==
Loudwire named it the 12th best hard rock song of 2017.

== Personnel ==
- Johnny Stevens – vocals, guitar
- Rich Meyer – bass
- Ryan Meyer – drums

== Charts ==
=== Weekly charts ===
Weekly chart performance for "Little One"
| Chart (2017) | Peak position |
|---|---|
| Canada Rock (Billboard) | 29 |
| US Hot Rock & Alternative Songs (Billboard) | 21 |
| US Rock & Alternative Airplay (Billboard) | 12 |

=== Year-end charts ===
Year-end chart performance for "Little One"
| Chart (2017) | Position |
|---|---|
| US Hot Rock Songs (Billboard) | 52 |
| US Rock Airplay (Billboard) | 30 |

== Certifications ==
Certifications for "Little One"
| Region | Certification | Certified units/sales |
|---|---|---|
| New Zealand (RMNZ) | Platinum | 30,000^{‡} |
^{‡} Sales+streaming figures based on certification alone.
