= Peeping Tom (band) =

American rock band

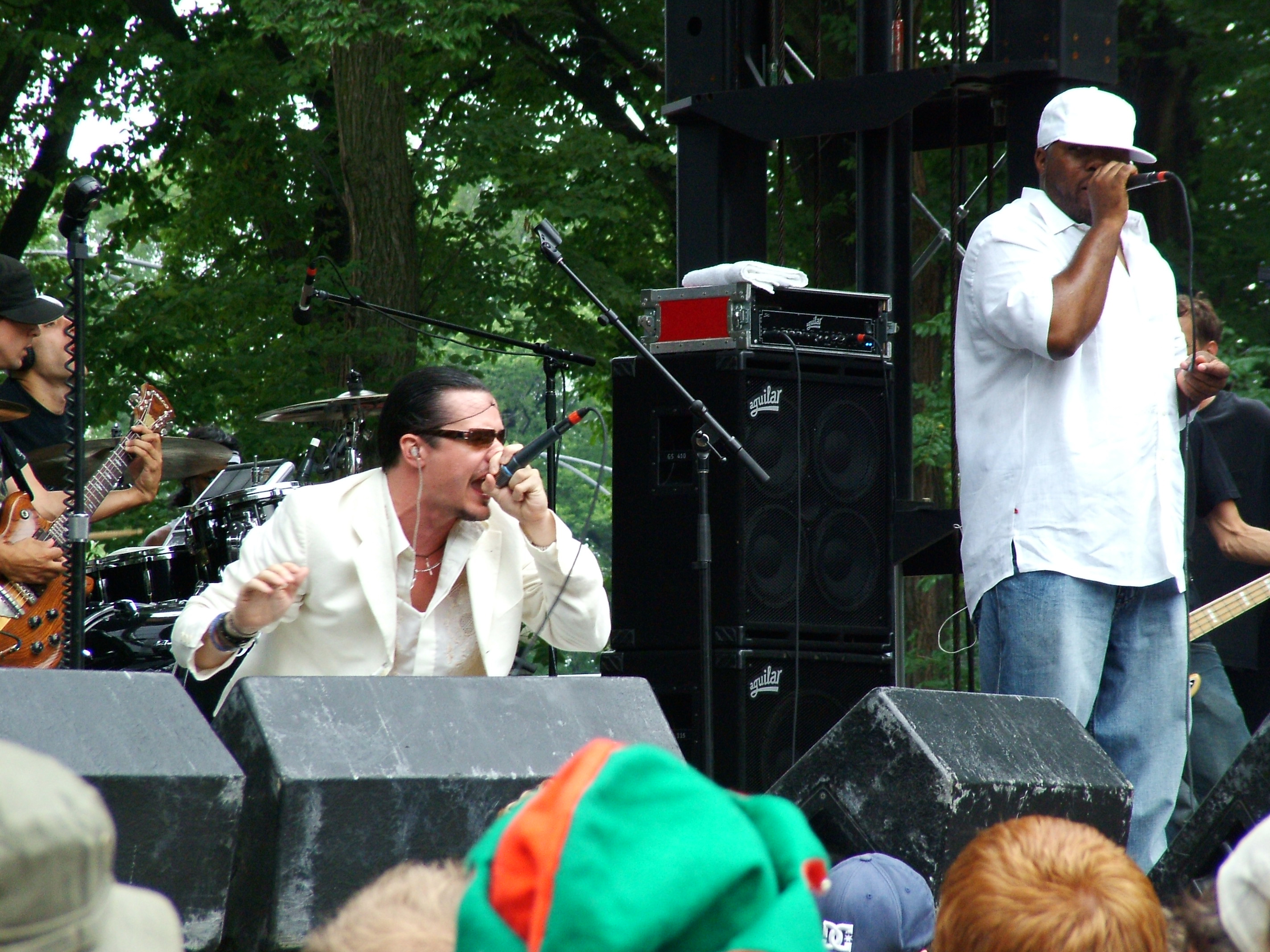
- Mike Patton and Rahzel performing at Lollapalooza

Background information
- Origin: San Diego, California, U.S.
- Genres: Experimental rock; experimental pop; avant-pop; trip hop; alt-pop; alternative hip-hop; hip-hop; alt R&B
- Years active: 2000–2007
- Label: Ipecac
- Members: Mike Patton

Peeping Tom was an American rock project led by Mike Patton, active between 2000 and 2007. They released one eponymous album and three singles on Ipecac Recordings. The project featured a rotating cast of musicians, including Amon Tobin, Massive Attack, Dub Trio, Odd Nosdam, Norah Jones, Bebel Gilberto, Dan the Automator, Rahzel, and Kool Keith.

Peeping Tom has been called Patton's most mainstream-accessible work since his days with Faith No More.

== History ==
The Peeping Tom project was conceived in 2000 by singer Mike Patton (Faith No More, Mr. Bungle, Fantômas, Tomahawk) and named after the 1960 film of the same name. Work on the self-titled album began in 2000, but it was delayed six years due to Patton's recording and touring work with his numerous other projects. Additionally, around this time, he collaborated with Björk on her 2004 album, Medúlla, and acted in the film Firecracker. The album was finally released in 2006, through Patton's own label, Ipecac Recordings.

The entire record was written by Patton together with various collaborators, including Norah Jones ("Sucker"), Kool Keith ("Getaway"), and Massive Attack ("Kill the DJ").

The first single was "Mojo", which featured Dan the Automator and Rahzel. It was accompanied by a music video featuring Danny DeVito, Mark Hoppus of Blink-182, and Rachel Hunter.

In 2023, Ipecac published the single "Pre-School Love Affair", which had previously been a B-side on "Mojo".

== Musical style and influences ==
Peeping Tom's music encompasses rock, heavy metal, experimental pop, pop, trip hop, alternative hip-hop, underground hip-hop, and hip-hop.

== Collaborators ==
- Rahzel
- Dan the Automator
- Kool Keith
- Doseone
- Norah Jones
- Bebel Gilberto
- Massive Attack
- Dub Trio
- Jel
- Odd Nosdam
- Amon Tobin
- Kid Koala
- Mike Relm
- Imani Coppola
- Butterscotch
- Rob Swift
- DJ Z-Trip
- DJ Quest
- DJ D-Sharp
- Dale Crover

== Discography ==
=== Studio albums ===
Year	Album details	Peak chart positions									
Year	Album details	US	US Heat.	US Ind.	AUS	BEL (FL)	BEL (WA)	FIN	FRA	NOR	UK
2006	Peeping Tom: Released: May 30, 2006; Label: Ipecac; Formats: CD, LP	103	1	3	12	34	86	31	115	22	136
"—" denotes a release that did not chart.

=== Singles ===
Year	Song	Peak chart positions	Album
Year	Song	US Alt.	Album
2006	"Mojo"	40	Peeping Tom
2007	"We're Not Alone"	—	Peeping Tom
2023	"Pre-School Love Affair"	—	"Mojo" B-side
"—" denotes a release that did not chart.

=== Music videos ===
- "Mojo" (2006)
