= Another Sound Is Dying =

Studio album by Dub Trio
- Released: January 29, 2008
- Studio: Studio Metronime, New Hampshire, U.S.
- Genre: Dub; punk rock
- Length: 59:53
- Label: Ipecac Recordings
- Producer: Dub Trio; Joel Hamilton

Dub Trio chronology
Cool Out and Coexist (2007)	Another Sound Is Dying (2008)	IV (2011)

Another Sound Is Dying is the third studio album by Dub Trio. It was released on Ipecac Recordings on January 29, 2008. "No Flag" features Mike Patton on vocals.

== Critical reception ==
Professional ratings
Aggregate scores
Source	Rating
Metacritic	70/100
Review scores
Source	Rating
AllMusic	3.5/5 stars
Pitchfork	6.5/10
PopMatters	7/10 stars

At Metacritic, which assigns a weighted average score out of 100 to reviews from mainstream critics, the album received an average score of 70, based on 5 reviews, indicating "generally favorable reviews".

Phil Freeman of AllMusic described the album as "a solid introduction to Dub Trio for newcomers" and "a welcome continuation of their journey into the space between metal and dub for existing fans." Chris Catania of PopMatters said, "The way Dub Trio utilize dub as a starting point and a foundation is alluring by itself, but, again, the avenues they explore and how they methodically incorporate trance-inducing melodies makes this a prime blueprint for anyone who wants to attempt creating a new sound."

== Track listing ==
All tracks are written by Dub Trio, except lyrics on "No Flag" written by Mike Patton.

No.	Title	Length
1.	"Not for Nothing"	5:34
2.	"Jog On"	2:01
3.	"Bay vs. Leonard"	3:20
4.	"Felicitacion"	4:33
5.	"Mortar Dub"	4:19
6.	"Regression Line"	4:28
7.	"Who Wants to Die?"	3:23
8.	"Respite"	5:23
9.	"No Flag"	4:09
10.	"The Midnight Runner"	4:39
11.	"Safe and Sane"	2:59
12.	"Agonist"	6:50
13.	"Fuck What You Heard"	3:40
14.	"Funishment"	4:35
Total length:		59:53

== Personnel ==
Credits adapted from liner notes.

Dub Trio

- Stu Brooks – bass guitar, instruments, gadgets, production, mixing
- DP Holmes – guitar, instruments, gadgets, production, mixing
- Joe Tomino – drums, instruments, gadgets, production, mixing

Additional personnel

- Mike Patton – vocals (on "No Flag")
- Joel Hamilton – production, executive production, engineering, mixing
- Joseph Yoon – executive production
- Marc Goodman – engineering assistance
- Fred Kevorkian – mastering
- Martin Kvamme – artwork
