= Flashblood =

Drug administration technique

Flashblood (also called flushblood) is an intravenous drug administration technique used by recreational drug users in which an individual injects himself with blood extracted from another drug user, most commonly one who has injected heroin. The purpose of the technique is to experience substance intoxication (a "high") or to help combat symptoms of drug withdrawal. The practice was first documented in an announcement submitted by Sheryl A. McCurdy, et al., in an October 2005 issue of BMJ. First reported to be practiced in Dar es Salaam, Tanzania, the practice had spread to other areas in East Africa by 2010.

After injecting heroin using a syringe, a user will extract approximately five cubic centimetres of blood from their vein, which another user will inject into themself. It is unclear if there is enough heroin in the small volume of injected blood to get high or if the high that many users claim is a result of traces of the heroin that had been injected by the user, or if the high is simply the result of the placebo effect. Sharing blood in this manner carries a very high risk of transmitting viruses such as hepatitis and HIV, which are prevalent among injection drug users in East Africa.

== Health concerns ==
As of 2010, The New York Times reported that the practice had been documented in Tanzania and Kenya. Despite the small number of individuals using this technique, its use among sex workers and the sharing and reuse of syringes exposes users to "the highest possible risk" of transmitting hepatitis and HIV. Dr. Nora Volkow of the National Institute on Drug Abuse called it "a crazy practice" that is the "most effective way of infecting yourself with H.I.V.". Dr. Sheryl A. McCurdy of the University of Texas Health Science Center at Houston, who first reported on the practice in a 2005 letter to BMJ, provided an update in a 2010 issue of the journal Addiction who theorized that the practice may have spread to other cities in East Africa. While Africa was traditionally bypassed by heroin traffickers as being too poor to afford their product, dealers had started using East African port cities on their smuggling routes to Europe, with some of the heroin used as bribes to law enforcement officials or received by couriers as payment. A February 2010 report by the United Nations Integrated Regional Information Network (IRIN) indicated that the practice was becoming increasingly common in Kenya's second-largest city, Mombasa.
