= HIV/AIDS in Vietnam =

Public health issue in Vietnam

Vietnam faces a concentrated HIV epidemic among high-risk groups, including sex workers and intravenous drug users. There are cases of HIV/AIDS in all provinces of Vietnam, though low testing rates make it difficult to estimate the true prevalence of the disease. The known rates among high-risk groups are high enough that there is a risk of HIV rates increasing among the general population as well.

People living with HIV face significant discrimination in Vietnam; although the country passed the Law on HIV/AIDS Prevention and Control in 2006 to provide legal protections to those living with the condition, social stigma remains a major barrier. This stigma, along with limited funding and resources, makes the epidemic difficult to control.

== Reporting ==
HIV prevalence data in Vietnam is based primarily on the national HIV/AIDS case reporting system and the HIV Sentinel Surveillance (HSS) program. The HSS, along with the modernized HSS+ system which integrates biological and behavioral measures, systematically tracks the epidemic among key populations across Vietnam. While early data collection was limited, the government now reports HIV cases in all 63 of Vietnam's provinces and municipalities.

Despite improvements in the national monitoring and evaluation framework, health experts estimate that the actual number of people living with HIV is higher than reported figures due to barriers in testing and social stigma. Recent estimates place the HIV prevalence in the general adult population at approximately 0.3%. The epidemic remains heavily concentrated in high-risk groups, with prevalence rates significantly higher among people who inject drugs (PWID), men who have sex with men (MSM), and female sex workers (FSW).

== Current state ==
The first case of HIV in Vietnam was detected in Ho Chi Minh City in 1990. Following its introduction, the estimated number of people living with HIV rose drastically from roughly 3,000 in 1992 to a peak in new infections during the early 2000s. While early economic and health projections warned of a generalized epidemic, the outbreak has instead remained largely concentrated within key populations. As of 2023, the Joint United Nations Programme on HIV/AIDS (UNAIDS) estimates that approximately 270,000 people are living with HIV in Vietnam, including roughly 3,500 children under the age of 14.

Today, transmission continues to be driven by specific high-risk groups rather than the general public. While historical infection rates among people who inject drugs (PWID) were once as high as 30% in some provinces, expanded harm reduction programs have reduced the national prevalence among PWID to approximately 9.1%. In the 2020s, Vietnam's epidemiological profile has shifted significantly, with men who have sex with men (MSM) now accounting for the majority of new infections.

== Injection of drugs ==
Historically, people who inject drugs (PWID) were the primary demographic affected by the epidemic in Vietnam. During the outbreak's peak between 2000 and 2005, injection drug use drove a doubling of Vietnam's infection rate, eventually accounting for up to 65% of all cumulative cases. During this era, HIV prevalence among male PWID was estimated at over 23%, driven largely by the multiperson use of injecting equipment.

Today, widespread public health interventions—including methadone maintenance therapy and the distribution of sterile needles—have significantly curbed transmission within this group. Recent localized studies have shown that new HIV incidence among PWID has dropped to near-zero levels in areas with robust harm reduction programs. By 2023, public health data indicated that PWID accounted for only roughly 2% of new national HIV infections, with sexual transmission now driving the vast majority of cases.

While transmission via needle sharing has drastically declined, intersecting risk factors remain a public health focus. Epidemiological studies note that key populations frequently overlap; for example, a subset of PWID also engage in sex work or report inconsistent condom use. Rather than operating in isolation, the networks of PWID, female sex workers (FSW), and men who have sex with men (MSM) share overlapping behavioral risks that health workers continue to target through integrated, community-based prevention programs.

== Sexual transmission ==
Another key factor in the epidemic's trajectory involves sexual transmission linked to female sex workers (FSWs) and their clients. Historically, low condom use and high rates of sexually transmitted infections made FSWs highly vulnerable to HIV. In recent years, public health interventions have significantly increased safe sex practices. Integrated surveillance data consistently shows that the vast majority of FSWs report using condoms with new or irregular clients. Consistent condom use drops significantly with regular clients and intimate, non-paying partners.

This disparity in condom use creates a risk for the virus to spread from high-risk groups to the general public. Male clients of FSWs—who often do not use condoms consistently across all their sexual encounters—can act as a "bridging population," potentially transmitting the virus to their lower-risk spouses or girlfriends. While the overall HIV prevalence among FSWs has remained relatively low and stable, those who also inject drugs face a significantly compounded risk of infection.

== Women ==
While the HIV epidemic in Vietnam has historically been concentrated among high-risk groups, women in the general population also face significant risks, often through intimate partner transmission. As of 2022, women aged 15 and older account for nearly one-third of the approximately 250,000 people living with HIV in Vietnam. Historically, researchers raised concerns that HIV prevalence among women was heavily underreported, with some early models estimating that surveillance data captured as little as 16% of actual infections due to a lack of routine screening.

A major pathway for HIV transmission among women is through sexual contact with husbands or regular partners who engage in high-risk behaviors, such as injecting drugs or having unprotected sex with female sex workers, often without their wives' knowledge. Studies of pregnant women living with HIV have found that a majority acquired the infection from their husbands . Women living with HIV in Vietnam face intersectional challenges, experiencing severe gender-specific stigma that can hinder their access to healthcare and support services.

The risk of perinatal (mother-to-child) transmission has also been a focus of public health efforts. While early data suggested that over 1% of pregnant women in certain high-prevalence provinces tested positive for HIV, national prevalence among pregnant women has more recently been estimated at approximately 0.2%. Vietnam introduced a national Prevention of Mother-to-Child Transmission (PMTCT) program in 2005. Expanded access to antiretroviral therapy (ART) and early diagnosis has significantly improved outcomes, reducing mother-to-child transmission rates and improving infant survival in monitored provinces.

== Challenges ==
Social stigma against people living with HIV presents a major ongoing obstacle to epidemic control. Historically, discrimination in healthcare, employment, and education has been severe; in a highly publicized 2009 incident, parents in Ho Chi Minh City forced officials to expel children living with HIV from a local school. While public awareness has improved, the fear of status disclosure and subsequent discrimination still discourages many from seeking testing or enrolling in public health programs.

In the past, funding for Vietnam's HIV/AIDS programs was heavily dependent on international aid, with foreign donors like PEPFAR and the Global Fund accounting for up to 70% of the budget in the late 2000s. As Vietnam transitioned to lower-middle-income status in 2010, international funding drastically decreased. To prevent a collapse in care, the Vietnamese government executed a massive financial transition by integrating HIV services into the national Social Health Insurance (SHI) scheme. By 2023, domestic resources funded over 50% of the national HIV response, and SHI covered the cost of antiretroviral (ARV) drugs for more than 90% of insured patients.

To address historical shortages in healthcare human resources, Vietnam shifted away from relying solely on specialized, standalone HIV clinics. Instead, the Ministry of Health integrated HIV treatment directly into the primary healthcare system, including local commune health stations. The government has increasingly relied on "social contracting"—a system where provincial governments legally purchase HIV prevention and testing services directly from community-based organizations (CBOs) and peer networks, leveraging local advocates to reach marginalized populations that traditional health workers struggle to access.
