= Lydia (Highly Suspect song) =

Single by Highly Suspect

from the album Mister Asylum
- Released: March 4, 2015
- Genre: Alternative rock
- Length: 4:03
- Label: 300
- Songwriter: Highly Suspect
- Producer: Joel Hamilton

Highly Suspect singles chronology
"Lydia" (2015)	"Bloodfeather" (2015)

"Lydia" is the debut single by American rock band Highly Suspect, from their debut album Mister Asylum (2015). The song first appeared on the 2013 EP Black Ocean. It hit the top 5 on the Billboard Mainstream Rock chart in August 2015.

== Music video ==
The music video was released in June 2015. Director TS Pfeffer, conceptualized the stunt and brought it to the band in early 2015. It was shot underwater in one take and stars freediver Marina Kazankova.

== Charts ==
=== Weekly charts ===
Weekly chart performance for "Lydia"
Chart (2015)	Peak position
US Hot Rock & Alternative Songs (Billboard)	26
US Rock & Alternative Airplay (Billboard)	14

=== Year-end charts ===
Year-end chart performance for "Lydia"
Chart (2015)	Position
US Hot Rock Songs (Billboard)	62

== Certifications ==
Certifications for "Lydia"
Region	Certification	Certified units/sales
New Zealand (RMNZ)	2× Platinum	60,000^{‡}
United States (RIAA)	Gold	500,000^{‡}
^{‡} Sales+streaming figures based on certification alone.
