= Dub Trio =

American dub/rock band

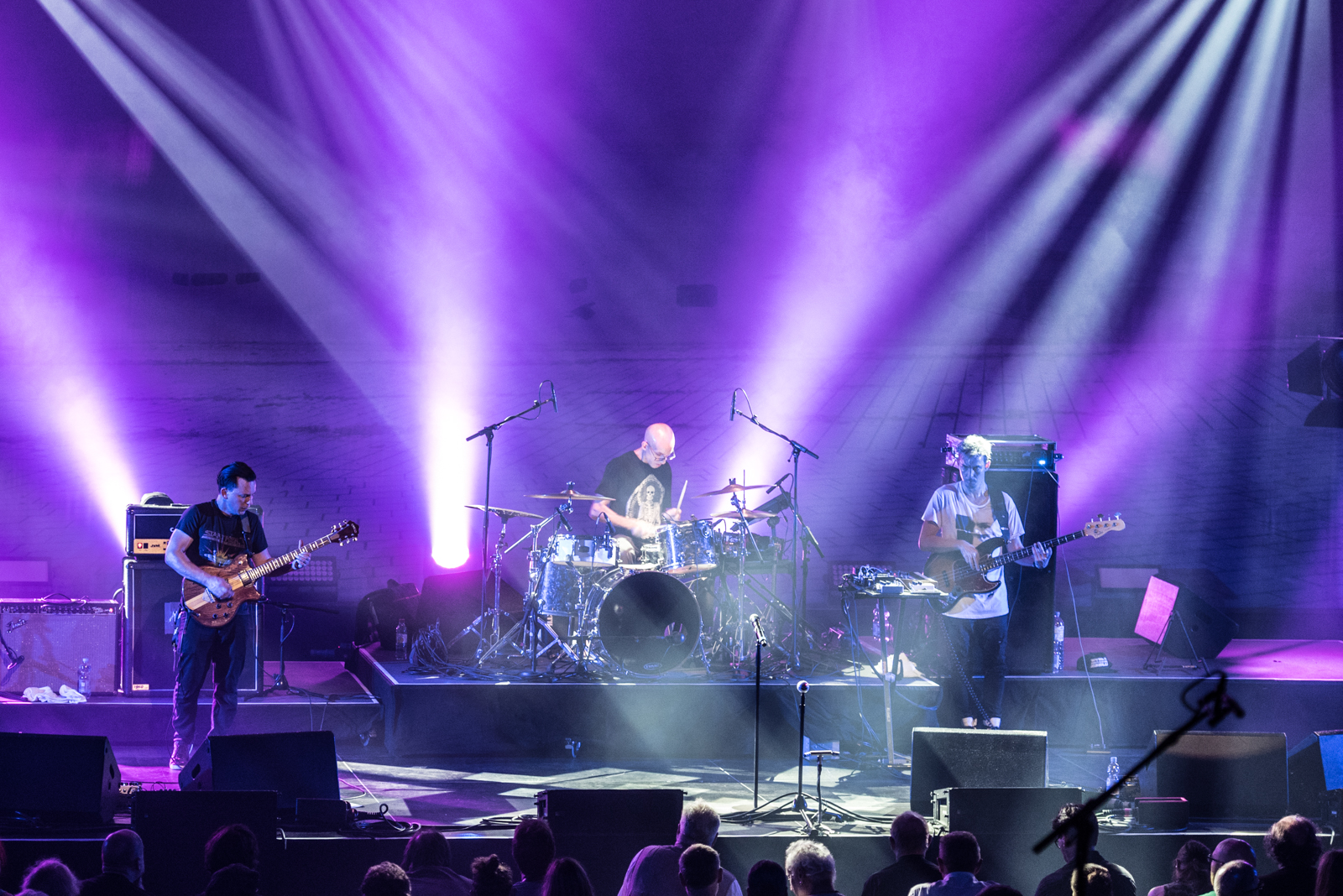
- Dub Trio at the Moers Festival 2017

Background information
- Origin: Brooklyn, New York City, New York, United States
- Genres: Rock, punk rock, heavy metal, dub
- Years active: 2000–present
- Labels: Ipecac Recordings, ROIR
- Members: Stu Brooks; DP Holmes; Joe Tomino
- Website: www.dubtrio.com

Dub Trio is a dub/rock cross-over band from Brooklyn, New York City, New York.

== History ==
Dub Trio consists of bassist Stu Brooks, guitarist DP Holmes, and drummer Joe Tomino. With the addition of electronic, rock, punk and heavy metal, the group pays homage to King Tubby's original dub style, while recreating studio trickery live on stage using various delay pedals, keyboards, and samplers.

While Tomino can add delay or loop effects to his own drums, each member of the band has the ability to "dub" the other via microphones on Tomino's kit running to delay effects on both Holmes' and Brooks' pedal boards.

In 2004, Dub Trio released the debut album, Exploring the Dangers Of. Dub Trio's first recording with vocals, "We're Not Alone" with Mike Patton, was featured on both the group's New Heavy (2006) and on Peeping Tom's Peeping Tom (2006). The group also toured with Patton as his rhythm section during Peeping Tom's 2006 US tour.

The group appeared on the cover of Beyond Race Magazine's first issue in 2006.

In 2007, Dub Trio released a live album, Cool Out and Coexist, which was recorded live during two dates at Union Pool in Brooklyn. In 2008, the group released an album, Another Sound Is Dying.

Dub Trio opened for and toured with Matisyahu in 2009.

In 2010, Dub Trio released a 3-track EP, III. In 2011, the group released IV.

In February 2019, the band announced the release of their fifth album, The Shape of Dub to Come, which came out on April 26, 2019.

== Other work ==
Bassist Stu Brooks has recorded with 50 Cent, Tupac Shakur, Slick Rick, Lloyd Banks, Tony Yayo, Young Buck, Mobb Deep, Macy Gray and Lauryn Hill's upcoming album (2013). Brooks produced the upcoming Matisyahu record (2013). Drummer Joe Tomino toured with The Fugees. Guitarist DP Holmes can be heard on albums by Mos Def and Common. Drummer Joe Tomino was also a member of the now defunct supergroup Battle of Mice, and is currently (2024) playing with Sublime with Rome.

== Members ==
- Stu Brooks - bass guitar
- DP Holmes - guitar
- Joe Tomino - drums

== Discography ==
=== Studio albums ===
- Exploring the Dangers Of (2004)
- New Heavy (2006)
- Another Sound Is Dying (2008)
- IV (2011)
- The Shape of Dub to Come (2019)

=== Live albums ===
- Cool Out and Coexist (2007)

=== EPs ===
- III (2010)

=== Singles ===
- "Not Alone" (2006)
- "VCO Dub" (2012)

=== Guest appearances ===
- Peeping Tom - "We're Not Alone (Remix)" from Peeping Tom (2006)
- Z-Trip - "Go Hard" from All Pro: Soundtrack (2007)

=== Productions ===
- Matisyahu - Live at Stubb's, Vol. 2 (2011)
