= MCID =

Studio album by Highly Suspect
- Released: November 1, 2019
- Recorded: 2018–2019
- Genres: Hip-hop; electronic; rock; heavy metal
- Length: 58:19
- Labels: 300; Atlantic
- Producer: Highly Suspect

Highly Suspect chronology
The Boy Who Died Wolf (2016)	MCID (2019)	The Midnight Demon Club (2022)

Singles from MCID
- 1. "16" / "Upperdrugs" Released: August 16, 2019; 2. "Tokyo Ghoul" Released: October 4, 2019; 3. "Canals" Released: October 25, 2019; 4. "These Days" Released: February 25, 2020

Professional ratings
Review scores
Source	Rating
Cryptic Rock	4.5/5
Platform	5/10
The Soundboard	6/10

MCID (initialism for "My Crew Is Dope") is the third studio album by American rock band Highly Suspect, released on November 1, 2019. Loudwire named it one of the 50 best rock albums of 2019.

== History ==
On August 16, 2019, Highly Suspect announced their third album, along with the release of two singles, "16" and "Upperdrugs"; the former track reached No. 1 on Billboard's Mainstream Rock chart.

On October 4, a third single "Tokyo Ghoul" featuring Young Thug was released.

On October 25, a fourth single "Canals" was released.

On February 25, 2020, "These Days" was released as the fifth single from the album.

== Track listing ==
All tracks are written by Highly Suspect.

No.	Title	Length
1.	"Fly"	4:28
2.	"16"	4:38
3.	"Freakstreet"	3:49
4.	"Canals"	4:33
5.	"Upperdrugs"	5:16
6.	"Tetsuo's Bike"	1:20
7.	"Tokyo Ghoul" (featuring Young Thug)	4:28
8.	"SOS" (featuring Gojira)	3:23
9.	"@tddybear" (featuring Conor Mason of Nothing but Thieves)	4:59
10.	"Arizona"	3:34
11.	"Juzo"	1:26
12.	"The Silk Road" (featuring Tee Grizzley)	3:52
13.	"Taking Off"	3:29
14.	"These Days"	3:02
15.	"Snow White"	3:53
16.	"Nairobi (Outro)"	2:09
Total length:		58:19

== Personnel ==
Highly Suspect

- Johnny Stevens – lead vocals, guitar, synthesizer, piano
- Matt Kofos – guitar, synthesizer, vocals
- Mark Schwartz – guitar, synthesizer, vocals
- Rich Meyer – bass, synthesizer, vocals
- Ryan Meyer – drums, vocals

== Charts ==
Chart (2019)	Peak position
Australian Digital Albums (ARIA)	48
New Zealand Albums (RMNZ)	20
US Billboard 200	79
US Top Alternative Albums (Billboard)	4
US Top Rock Albums (Billboard)	10
