= My Name Is Human =

Single by Highly Suspect

from the album The Boy Who Died Wolf
- Released: 7 September 2016
- Length: 4:19
- Label: 300
- Songwriter: Highly Suspect
- Producer: Joel Hamilton

Highly Suspect singles chronology
"Serotonia" (2016)	"My Name Is Human" (2016)	"Little One" (2017)

Music video
- "My Name Is Human" on YouTube

"My Name Is Human" is a song by American rock band Highly Suspect. It was released as the lead single from their second studio album The Boy Who Died Wolf in 2016. The song reached No. 1 on the Billboard Mainstream Rock chart and stayed there for eight weeks. It is their first number one single. The song is also their highest-charting single on the Alternative Songs, Hot Rock Songs and Rock Airplay charts, where it peaked at No. 20, No. 12 and No. 7 respectively. The song was nominated for Best Rock Song at the 59th Annual Grammy Awards.

== Background ==
The song was released on September 7, 2016. Said Johnny Stevens of the song, “A lot of people think the song is about being a human. I believe some of us aren’t human at all. Or at least not completely, but that is still our name. At some point in the last couple hundred years something changed. The androids, the aliens...They aren’t coming. We are here."

== Music video ==
The music video was released through Vanity Fair on February 23, 2017. It begins in a futuristic setting with a female lifelike robot being assembled, portrayed by actress Chloe Bridges in its final form, and is intercut with Johnny Stevens singing and viewing the robot's features up close. Blue crystal-like formations appear to grow out of the floor, as more robots appear, standing in formation behind Stevens. It ends with Bridges resting her head on Stevens' shoulder while a red light flashes beneath his skin.

== Charts ==
=== Weekly charts ===
Weekly chart performance for "My Name Is Human"
Chart (2016–2017)	Peak position
Canada Rock (Billboard)	17
US Hot Rock & Alternative Songs (Billboard)	12
US Rock & Alternative Airplay (Billboard)	7

=== Year-end charts ===
Year-end chart performance for "My Name Is Human"
Chart (2017)	Position
Iceland (Tónlistinn)	43
US Hot Rock Songs (Billboard)	39
US Rock Airplay (Billboard)	21

== Certifications ==
Certifications for "My Name Is Human"
Region	Certification	Certified units/sales
New Zealand (RMNZ)	2× Platinum	60,000^{‡}
United States (RIAA)	Gold	500,000^{‡}
^{‡} Sales+streaming figures based on certification alone.
