= Mister Asylum =

Studio album by Highly Suspect
- Released: July 17, 2015
- Genres: Blues rock; garage rock; hard rock; punk blues; grunge
- Length: 39:58
- Labels: 300; Atlantic
- Producer: Joel Hamilton

Highly Suspect chronology
Black Ocean (2013)	Mister Asylum (2015)	The Boy Who Died Wolf (2016)

Singles from Mister Asylum
- 1. "Lydia" Released: March 4, 2015; 2. "Bloodfeather" Released: November 17, 2015

Professional ratings
Review scores
Source	Rating
AllMusic	Positive

Mister Asylum is the debut album by American rock band Highly Suspect, released on July 17, 2015. It features the singles "Lydia" and "Bloodfeather".

== Reception ==
The album debuted at No. 56 on Billboard 200, and No. 7 on the Top Rock Albums chart, selling 4,000 copies in its first week. It has sold 58,000 copies as of November 2016.

Timothy Monger at AllMusic reflected positively on the album, likening its "muscular" sound to Kings of Leon and Queens of the Stone Age.

== Track listing ==
No.	Title	Length
1.	"Mister Asylum"	4:03
2.	"Lost"	4:09
3.	"Lydia"	4:02
4.	"Bath Salts"	3:59
5.	"23" (featuring Sasha Dobson)	4:10
6.	"Mom"	4:58
7.	"Bloodfeather"	3:54
8.	"Fuck Me Up"	2:30
9.	"Vanity"	3:59
10.	"Claudeland"	4:14
Total length:		39:58

== Personnel ==
- Ryan Meyer – drums, vocals
- Rich Meyer – bass, vocals
- Johnny Stevens – guitar, vocals, synthesizer
- Sasha Dobson – backing vocals on "23"

== Charts ==
Chart (2015)	Peak position
US Billboard 200	56
US Top Hard Rock Albums (Billboard)	2
US Top Rock Albums (Billboard)	7
