= Highly Suspect =

American rock band

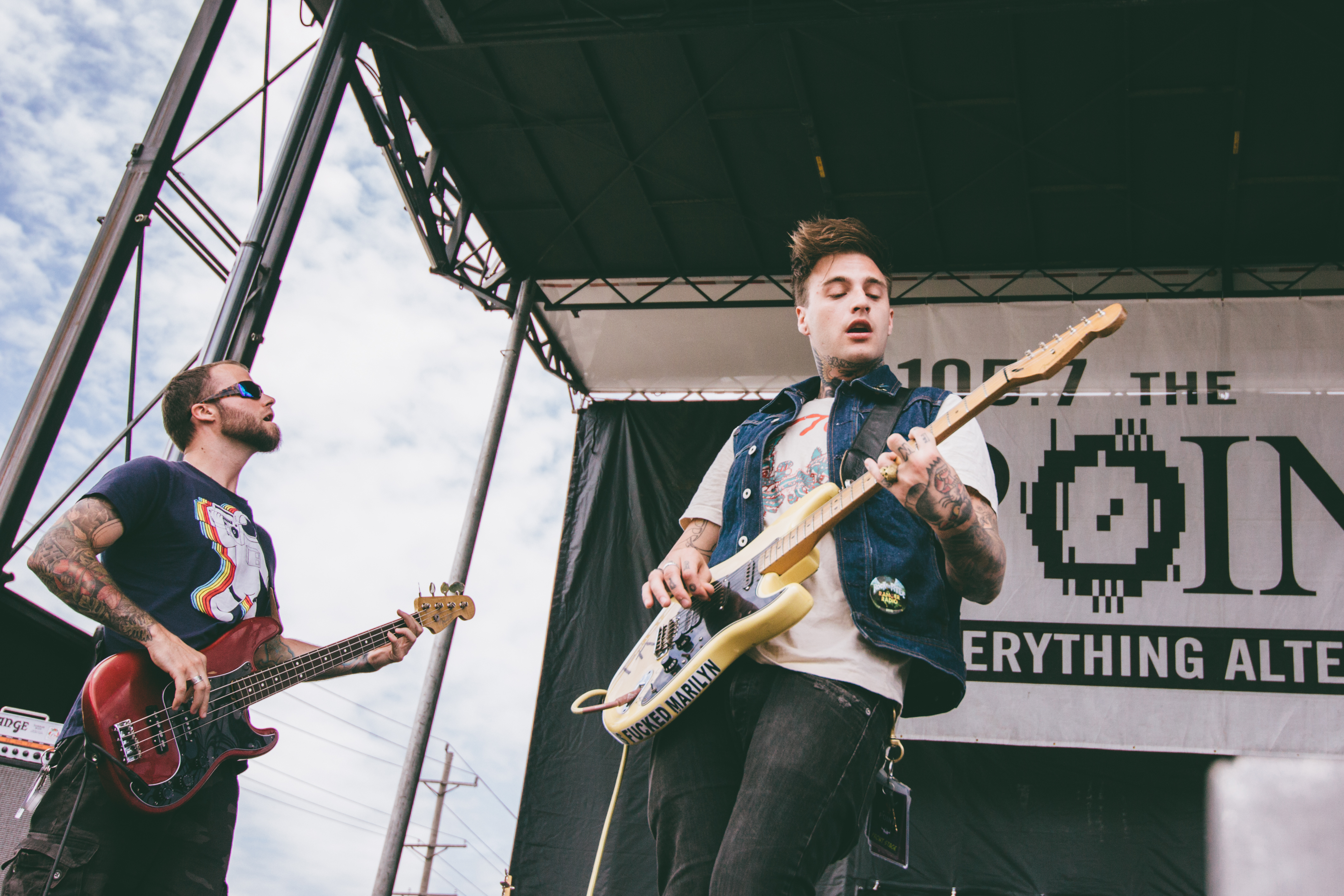
- Frontman Johnny Stevens (right) and bass player Rich Meyer (left) performing at Pointfest 33 at Hollywood Casino Amphitheatre in St. Louis, May 2015

Background information
- Origin: Cape Cod, Massachusetts. U.S.
- Genres: Alternative rock; hard rock; blues rock; grunge; garage rock
- Years active: 2009–present
- Labels: 300; Atlantic; Roadrunner
- Members: Johnny Stevens; Rich Meyer; Ryan Meyer; Matt Kofos; Mark Schwartz
- Website: highlysuspect.net

Highly Suspect is an American rock band from Cape Cod, Massachusetts. The band consists of twin brothers Rich (bass and backing vocals) and Ryan Meyer (drums and backing vocals), Johnny Stevens (guitar and lead vocals), Matt Kofos (guitar, synthesizer, percussion, and backing vocals) and Mark Schwartz (guitar, synthesizers, keyboards, backing vocals). After starting as a bar cover band, they moved to Brooklyn, New York where they recorded The Worst Humans EP with producer Joel Hamilton in 2012.

The band's first studio album Mister Asylum was released in 2015, earning them a nomination for Best Rock Album at the 58th Annual Grammy Awards. The song "Lydia" was nominated for Best Rock Song. Highly Suspect's second studio album, The Boy Who Died Wolf, was released in 2016. Two singles were released from the album, "My Name Is Human", which topped the Billboard US Mainstream Rock Songs chart, and "Little One", which peaked at number 2 on the same chart. Their third studio album, MCID, was released in 2019 and their fourth, The Midnight Demon Club, in 2022. Their fifth, As Above, So Below, came out on July 19, 2024.

== History ==
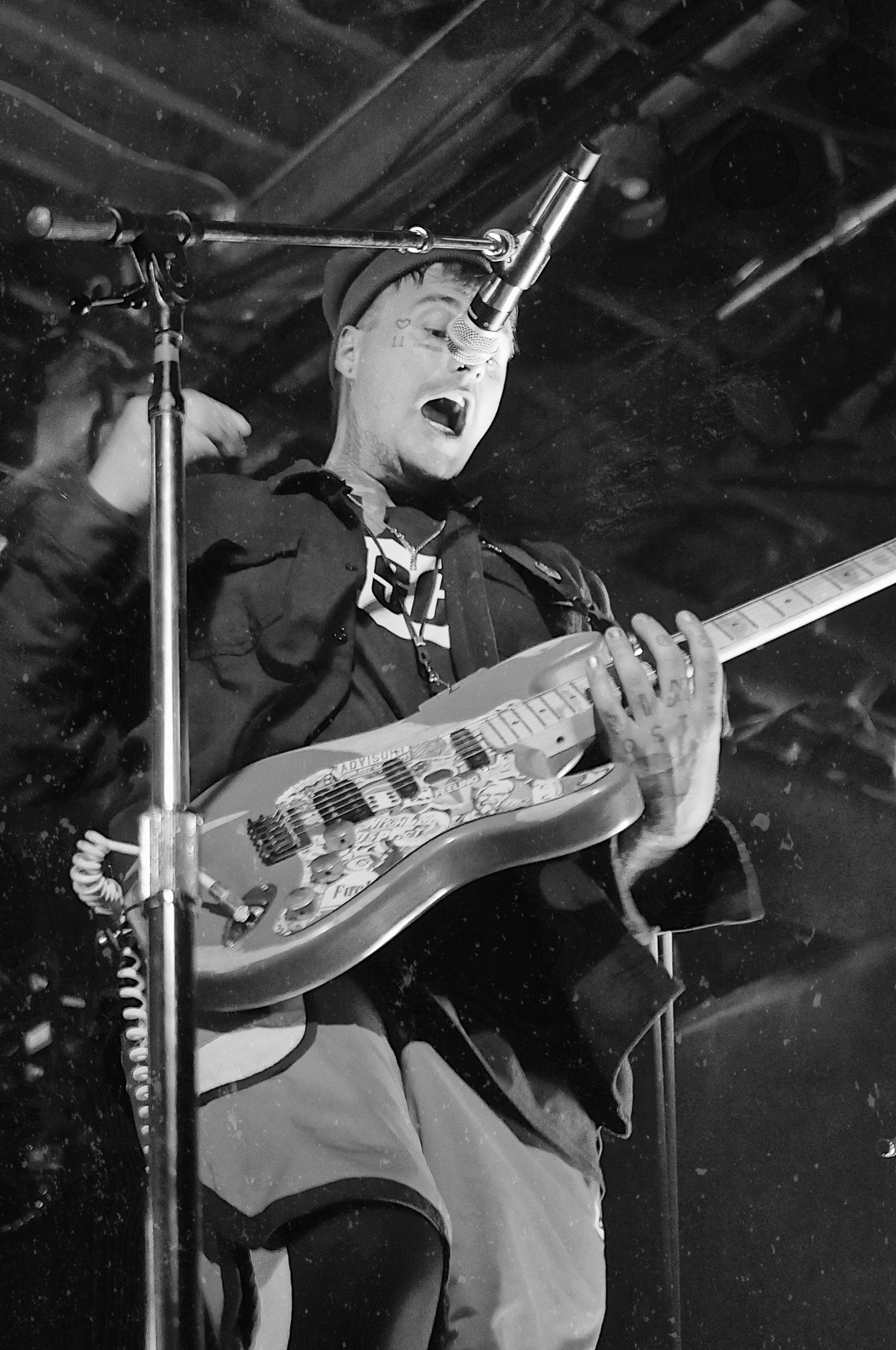
Johnny Stevens performing with Highly Suspect in 2019

=== Formation and Mister Asylum (2009–2015) ===
Highly Suspect began in 2009 as a cover band playing songs by Sublime, Jimi Hendrix, and Pink Floyd in local bars in the Cape Cod area including the British Beer Company, J.R Brody's Roadside Tavern, and Sundancers. They also toured and played a limited number of shows with bands 10 Years, Monster Truck, and Sevendust. The band all graduated from Dennis-Yarmouth Regional High School in South Yarmouth, Massachusetts, east of Hyannis.

First Offense was Highly Suspect's first EP, released on July 15, 2009. The EP has "Life's a Fun Ride", "Not Me", and "Smile On", their first written and recorded songs ("Not Me" would later appear on the self-titled album Highly Suspect). The Gang Lion EP was the band's second EP, released on October 3, 2010. It consists of "Gang Lion", "Big Bear", and "Then Mickey", all of which later appeared on their self-titled album, Highly Suspect.

The Worst Humans was the band's third EP, released July 13, 2012. The EP featured the songs "Bath Salts", "Gumshoe" and "The Go". The recordings were available for both physical purchase and digital download on Bandcamp. The band's fourth EP, Black Ocean, was released in October 2013. It featured two tracks from their debut release as well as three new tracks: "Fuck Me Up", "Lydia", and "Guess What". The release was jointly produced by Joel Hamilton and Joe Duplantier of Gojira.

Their self-titled compilation album Highly Suspect was released in 2011. It contains fourteen tracks, consisting of several new songs as well as previously released but re-recorded songs, like "Gang Lion" and "Then Mickey". The band toured the United States in early 2015 with Deftones, Chevelle, Halestorm, Catfish and the Bottlemen and Scott Weiland from Stone Temple Pilots. The music video for the song "Lydia" premiered on MTV.com on June 25, 2015.

Their first studio album Mister Asylum was released on July 17, 2015, via 300 Entertainment. The first single from the album, titled "Lydia", peaked at number 4 on the US Mainstream Rock Songs chart and at number 24 on the US Alternative Songs chart. On July 24, 2015, the album debuted at number 39 on the New Zealand Albums Chart. Highly Suspect was selected for iTunes' 2015 New Artist Spotlight by its editors. In November, the band released their second single "Bloodfeather", which peaked at number 5 on the US Mainstream Rock Songs chart.

=== The Boy Who Died Wolf (2016–2017) ===
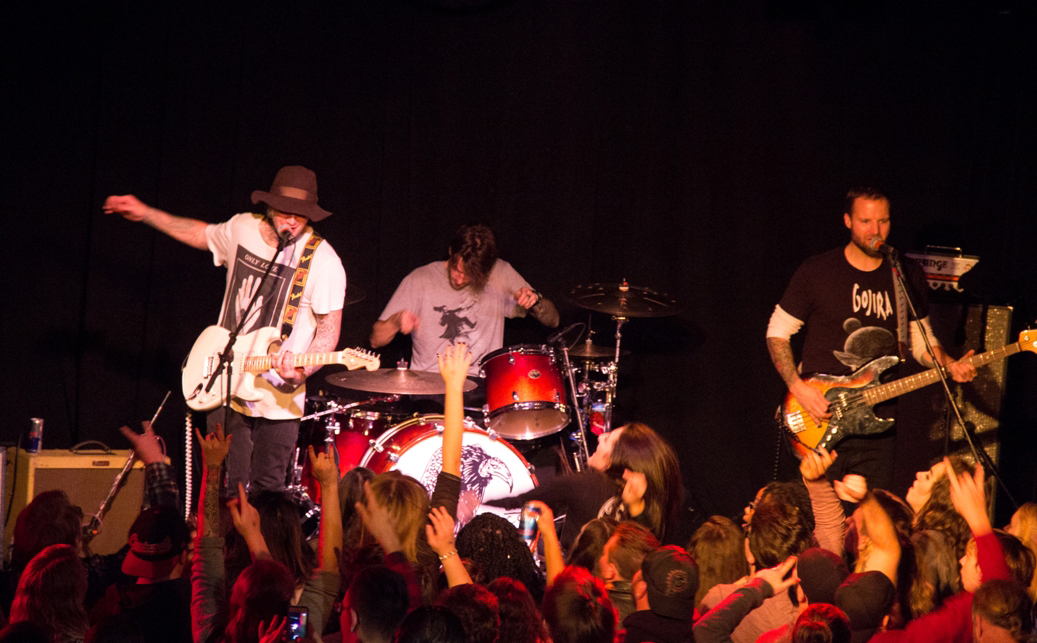
Highly Suspect performing at the Village Theatre in Davenport, Iowa east of Iowa City, November 2015

In June of 2016, Highly Suspect travelled to Bogota Colombia to record their second studio album, again with producer Joel Hamilton. The Boy Who Died Wolf, was released November 18, 2016. The band released the single "My Name Is Human" on September 7, 2016. A second single, "Little One", was released on April 26, 2017. On December 6, it was announced that "My Name Is Human" was nominated for Best Rock Song at the 59th Annual Grammy Awards.

=== MCID (2018–2021) ===
The band's third studio album, MCID, was announced on August 16, along with the release of lead singles "16" and "Upperdrugs". A single featuring Young Thug entitled "Tokyo Ghoul" and Stevens' hip-hop persona "Terrible Johnny" was released October 4, 2019. The fourth single, "Canals", was released on October 25, 2019. The album was released on November 1. The album's fifth and final single, "These Days", was released on February 20, 2020.

=== The Midnight Demon Club (2022–2023) ===
The band's fourth full-length album, The Midnight Demon Club, came out on September 9, 2022, featuring singles such as "Natural Born Killer" and "Pink Lullabye".

=== As Above, So Below (2024–Present) ===
On July 19th, 2024 the band released their fifth full-length album As Above, So Below, announcing a supporting tour beginning in September 2024.

== Musical style ==
Highly Suspect's musical style has been described as alternative rock, hard rock, blues rock, grunge, rock and roll, progressive rock, and garage rock. Their third studio album, MCID, marked a change in sound and utilized elements of hip hop, pop, and electropop.

== Band members ==
- Johnny Stevens – lead vocals, guitar, synthesizer, piano (2009–present)
- Ryan Meyer – drums, vocals (2009–present)
- Rich Meyer – bass, synthesizer, vocals (2009–present)
- Matt Kofos – guitar, synthesizer, vocals (2019–present)
- Mark Schwartz – guitar, synthesizer, keyboards, vocals (2019–present)

== Discography ==
=== Studio albums ===
List of studio albums, with selected chart positions
Title	Album details	Peak chart positions						
Title	Album details	US	US Alt.	US Dig.	US Hard	US Rock	US Sales	NZ
Highly Suspect	Released: 2011; Label: self-released; Formats: CD, digital download	—	—	—	—	—	—	—
Mister Asylum	Released: July 17, 2015; Label: 300; Formats: CD, digital download	56	—	9	2	7	23	39
The Boy Who Died Wolf	Released: November 18, 2016; Label: 300; Formats: CD, digital download	28	1	8	2	2	16	10
MCID	Released: November 1, 2019; Label: 300, Atlantic; Formats: CD, digital download, streaming	79	4	4	—	10	18	20
The Midnight Demon Club	Released: September 9, 2022; Label: Roadrunner/FRSKT; Formats: CD, digital download, streaming	—	—	—	—	—	—	—
As Above, So Below	Released: July 19, 2024; Label: Roadrunner, 300, Elektra; Formats: Digital download, streaming	—	—	—	—	—	—	6

=== EPs ===
- First Offense (2009)
- The Gang Lion EP (2010)
- The Worst Humans (2012)
- Black Ocean (2013)

=== Singles ===
List of singles as lead artist, with selected chart positions
Title	Year	Peak chart positions						Certifications	Album
Title	Year	US Rock Air.	US Alt.	US Main.	US Rock	CAN Rock	NZ	Certifications	Album
"Lydia"	2015	14	24	4	26	—	—	RIAA: Gold; RMNZ: 2x Platinum	Mister Asylum
"Bloodfeather"	2015	21	37	5	—	—	—	RMNZ: Gold	Mister Asylum
"Serotonia"	2016	—	—	—	—	—	—	RMNZ: Gold	The Boy Who Died Wolf
"My Name Is Human"	2016	7	20	1	12	17	— (Note: "My Name Is Human" did not enter the NZ Top 40 Singles Chart, but peaked at number seven on the NZ Heatseeker Singles Chart.)	RIAA: Gold; RMNZ: 2x Platinum	The Boy Who Died Wolf
"Little One"	2017	12	26	2	21	29	—	RMNZ: Platinum	The Boy Who Died Wolf
"16"	2019	3	15	1	6	26	— (Note: "16" did not enter the NZ Top 40 Singles Chart, but peaked at number 22 on the NZ Hot Singles Chart.)	RMNZ: Platinum	MCID
"Upperdrugs"	2019	—	—	—	—	—	— (Note: "Upperdrugs" did not enter the NZ Top 40 Singles Chart, but peaked at number 32 on the NZ Hot Singles Chart.)		MCID
"Tokyo Ghoul"	2019	—	—	—	—	—	—		MCID
"Canals"	2019	—	—	40	—	—	—	RMNZ: Gold	MCID
"These Days"	2020	31	39	10	—	—	—		MCID
"Natural Born Killer"/ "Pink Lullabye"	2022	7	16	1	—	—	—		The Midnight Demon Club
"Natural Born Killer"/ "Pink Lullabye"	2022	—	—	—	—	—	—		The Midnight Demon Club
"Ice Cold"/ "New California"	2022	—	35	27	—	—	—		The Midnight Demon Club
"Ice Cold"/ "New California"	2022	—	—	—	—	—	—		The Midnight Demon Club
"Summertime Voodoo"	2024	—	—	32	—	—	—		As Above, So Below
"The Blue-Eyed Devil"	2024	—	—	—	—	—	—		As Above, So Below
"The 8th of October (To August 17th)"	2024	—	—	—	—	—	—		As Above, So Below
"Plastic Boxes"	2024	—	—	23	—	—	—		As Above, So Below
"Big Shop of Horrors"	2026	—	—	—	—	—	— (Note: "Big Shop of Horrors" did not enter the NZ Top 40 Singles Chart, but peaked at number 35 on the NZ Hot Singles Chart.)		Non-album single
"—" denotes a recording that did not chart.

=== Music videos ===
Title	Year	Director(s)	Album	Link
"Gang Lion"	2012	Nate Severdija	Highly Suspect	
"Bath Salts"	2012	Jamie Northrup	The Worst Humans	
"Lydia"	2015	TS Pfeffer	Mister Asylum	
"Bloodfeather"	2016	TS Pfeffer	Mister Asylum	
"Serotonia"	2016	Johnny Stevens	The Boy Who Died Wolf	
"My Name Is Human"	2017	Marc Klasfeld	The Boy Who Died Wolf	
"Little One"	2017	Djay Brawner & Johnny Stevens	The Boy Who Died Wolf	
"16"	2019	Djay Brawner & Johnny Stevens	MCID	
"These Days"	2020	Rock And Egg	MCID	
"Natural Born Killer"	2022	Andrew Sandler	The Midnight Demon Club	
"New California"	2023	Steele Pace & Haden McKenna	The Midnight Demon Club	
"Plastic Boxes"	2024	Johnny Stevens	As Above, So Below	
"Run For Your Death (More Pills)"	2025	Erren Franklin	As Above, So Below	

== Awards and nominations ==
Year	Organization	Title	Award	Result	Ref
2016	58th Annual Grammy Awards	"Lydia"	Best Rock Song	Nominated	
2016	58th Annual Grammy Awards	Mister Asylum	Best Rock Album	Nominated	
2017	59th Annual Grammy Awards	"My Name Is Human"	Best Rock Song	Nominated	
2017	Alternative Press Music Awards	Highly Suspect	Best Hard Rock Artist	Nominated	
2017	Alternative Press Music Awards	"Bloodfeather"	Best Music Video	Nominated	
2018	2018 iHeartRadio Music Awards	Highly Suspect	Rock Artist of the Year	Nominated	
