= Work of art =

Artistic creation of aesthetic value

Examples of paintings

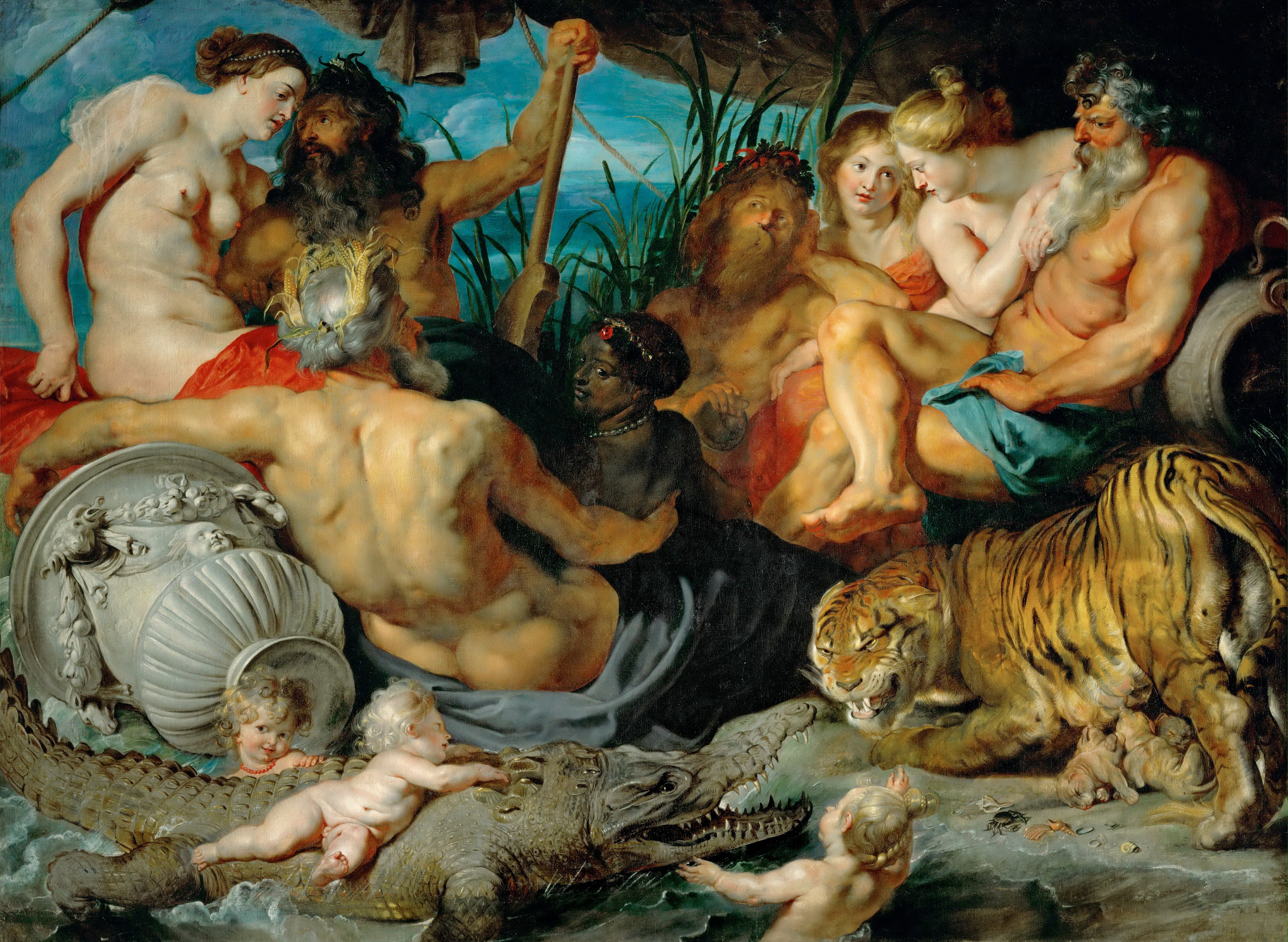
The Four Continents by Peter Paul Rubens

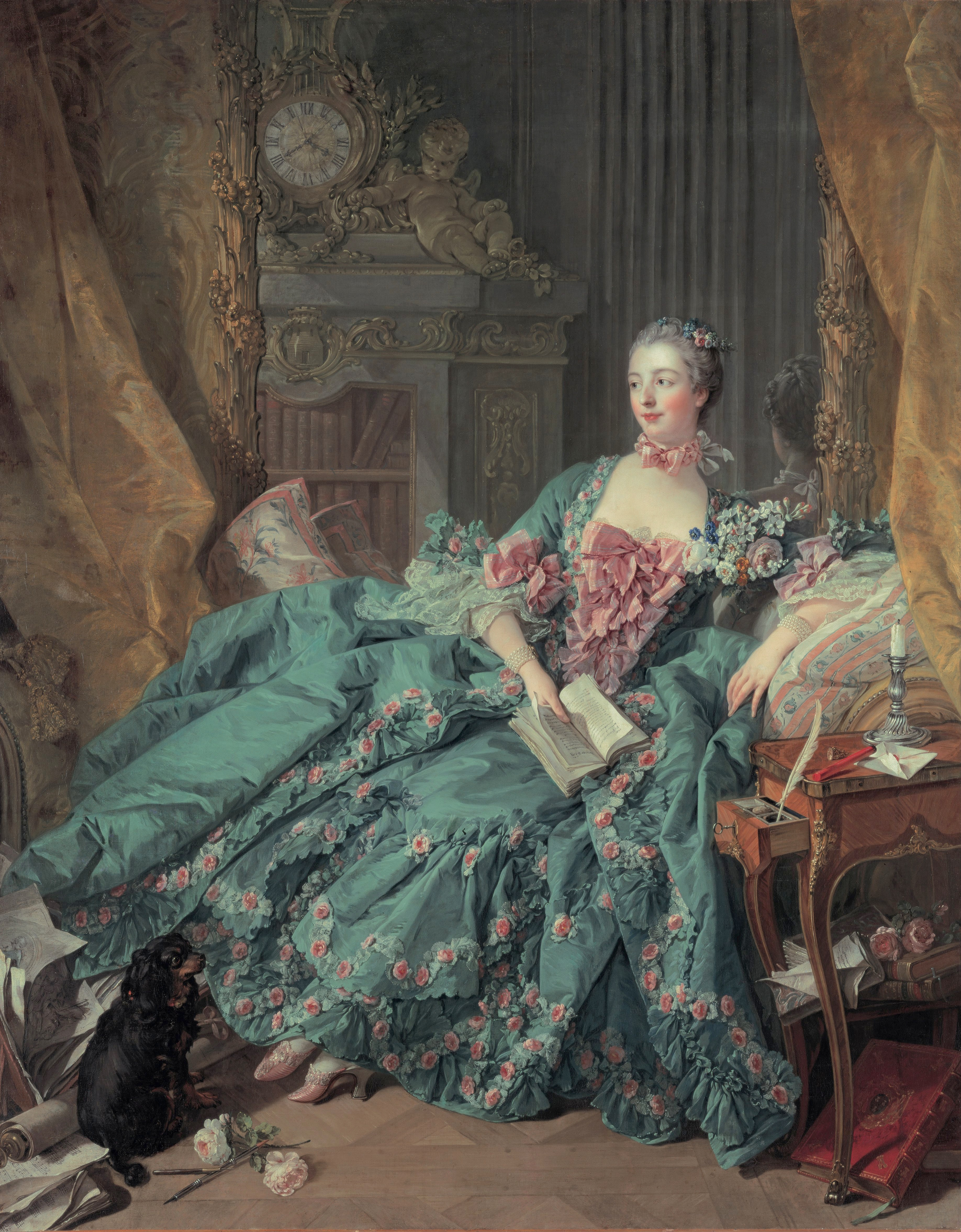
A portrait of Madame de Pompadour and a dog at the foot of her shoes by François Boucher

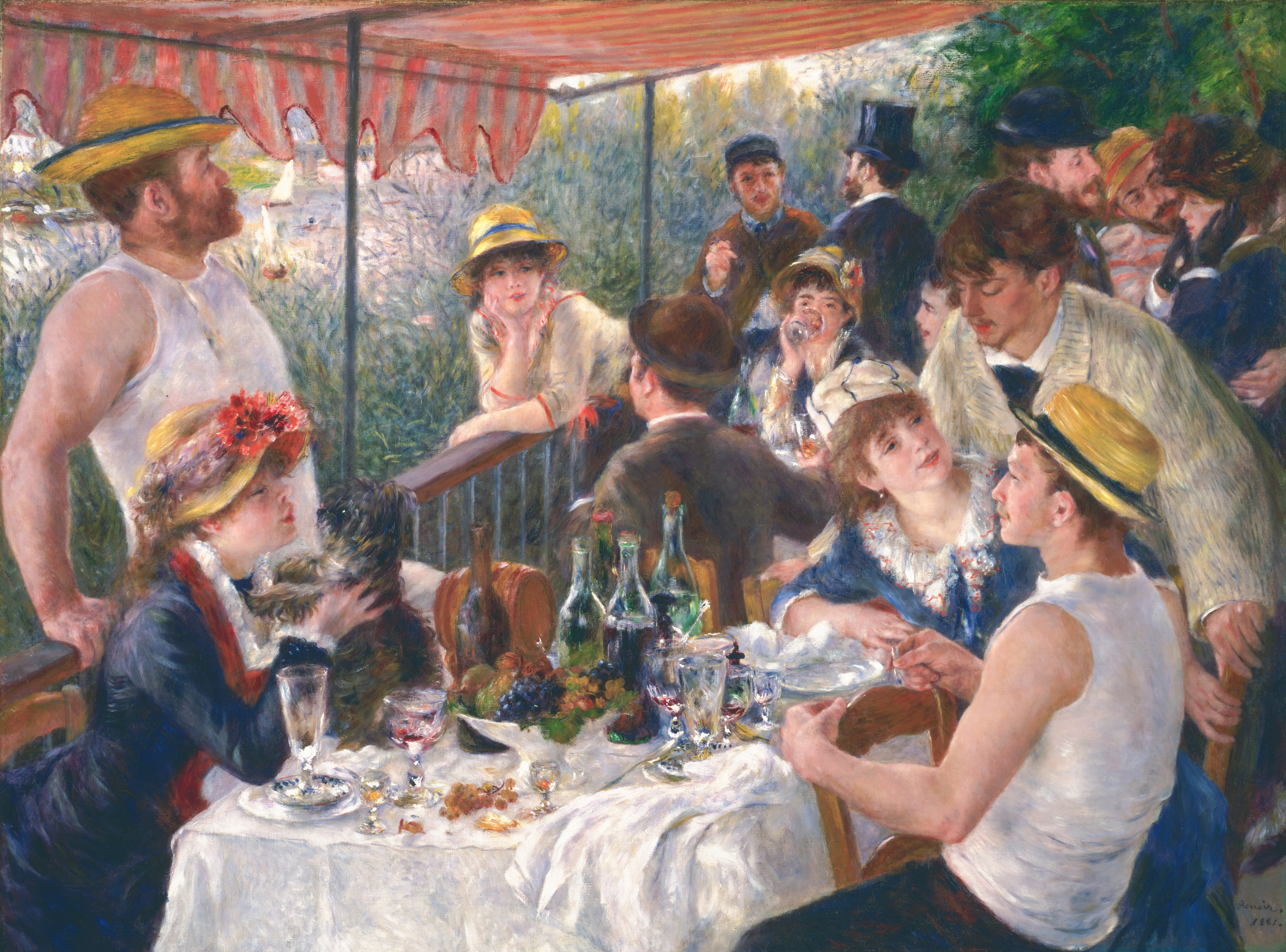
Luncheon of the Boating Party by Pierre-Auguste Renoir

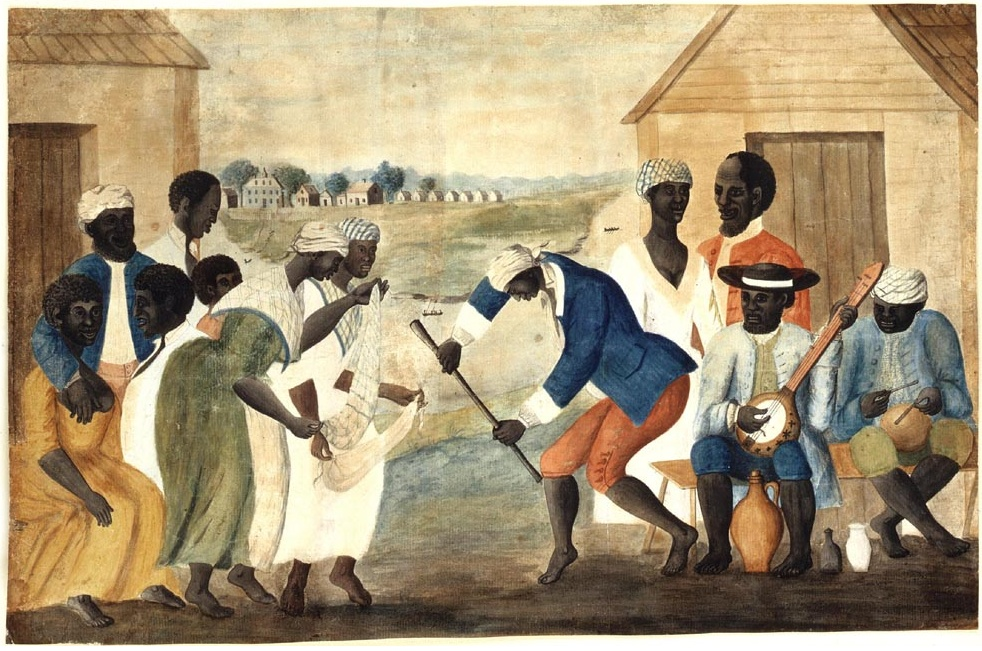
The Old Plantation attributed to John Rose

Examples of sculptures
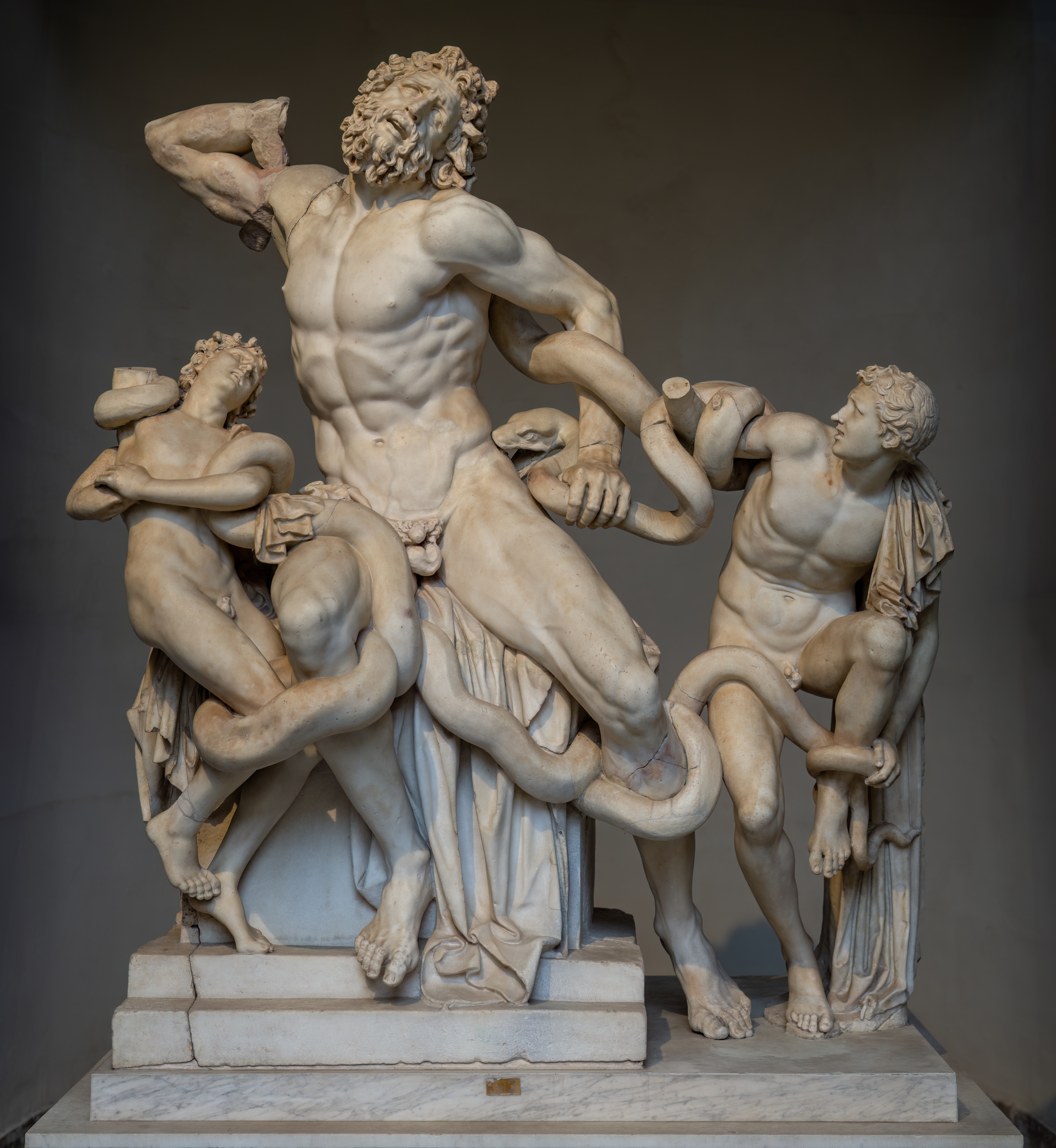
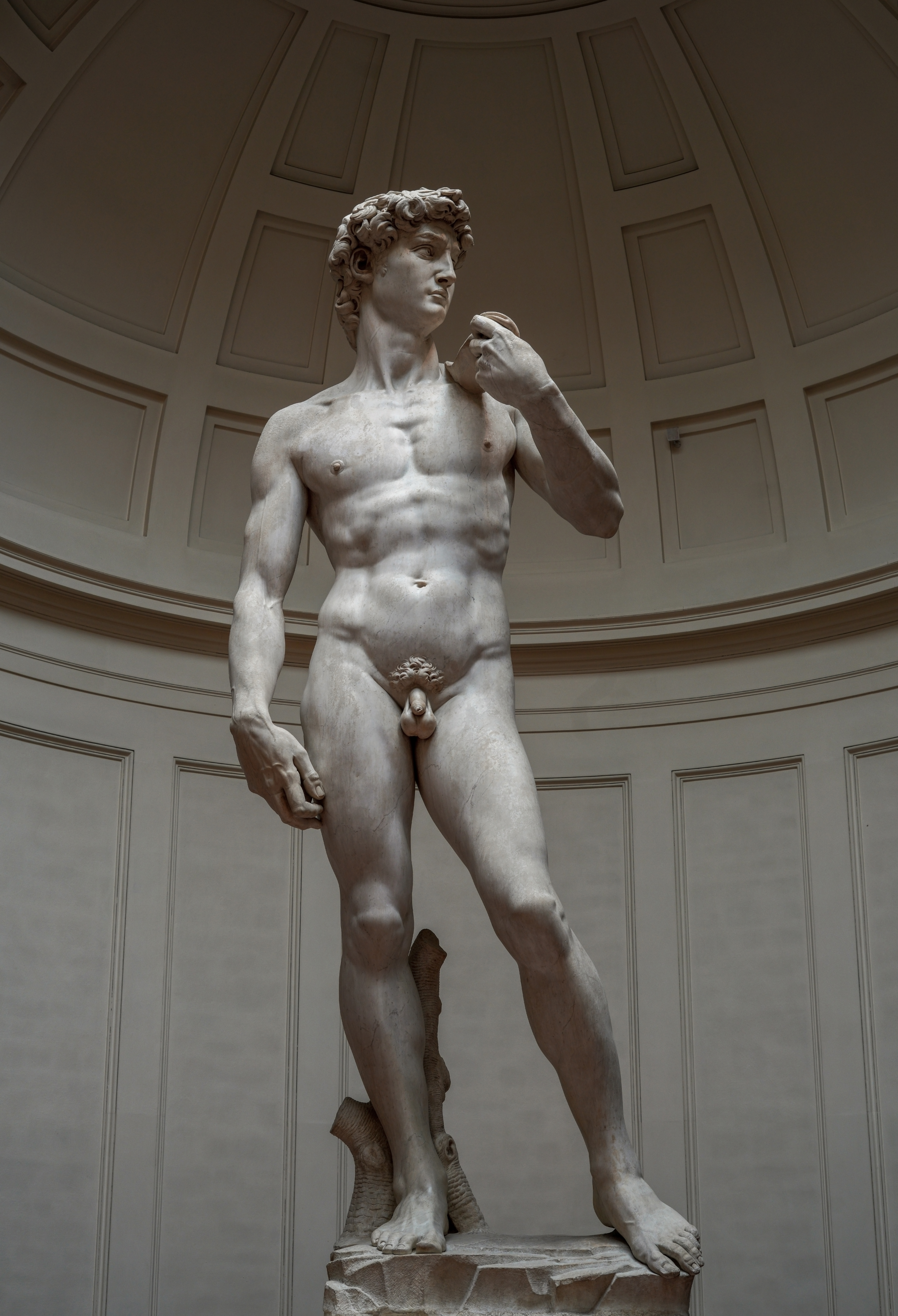
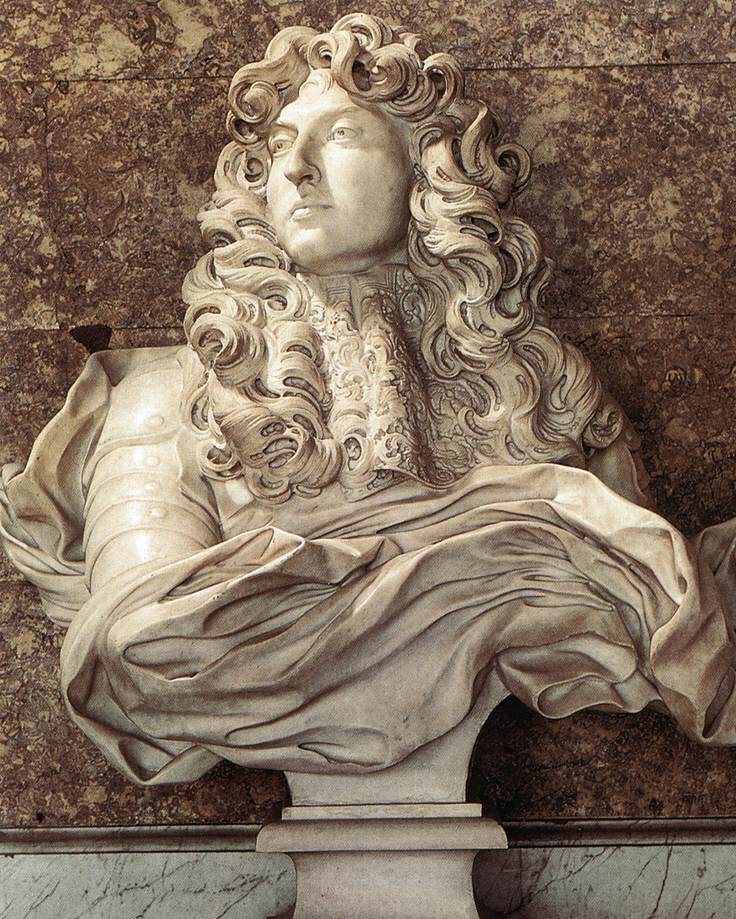
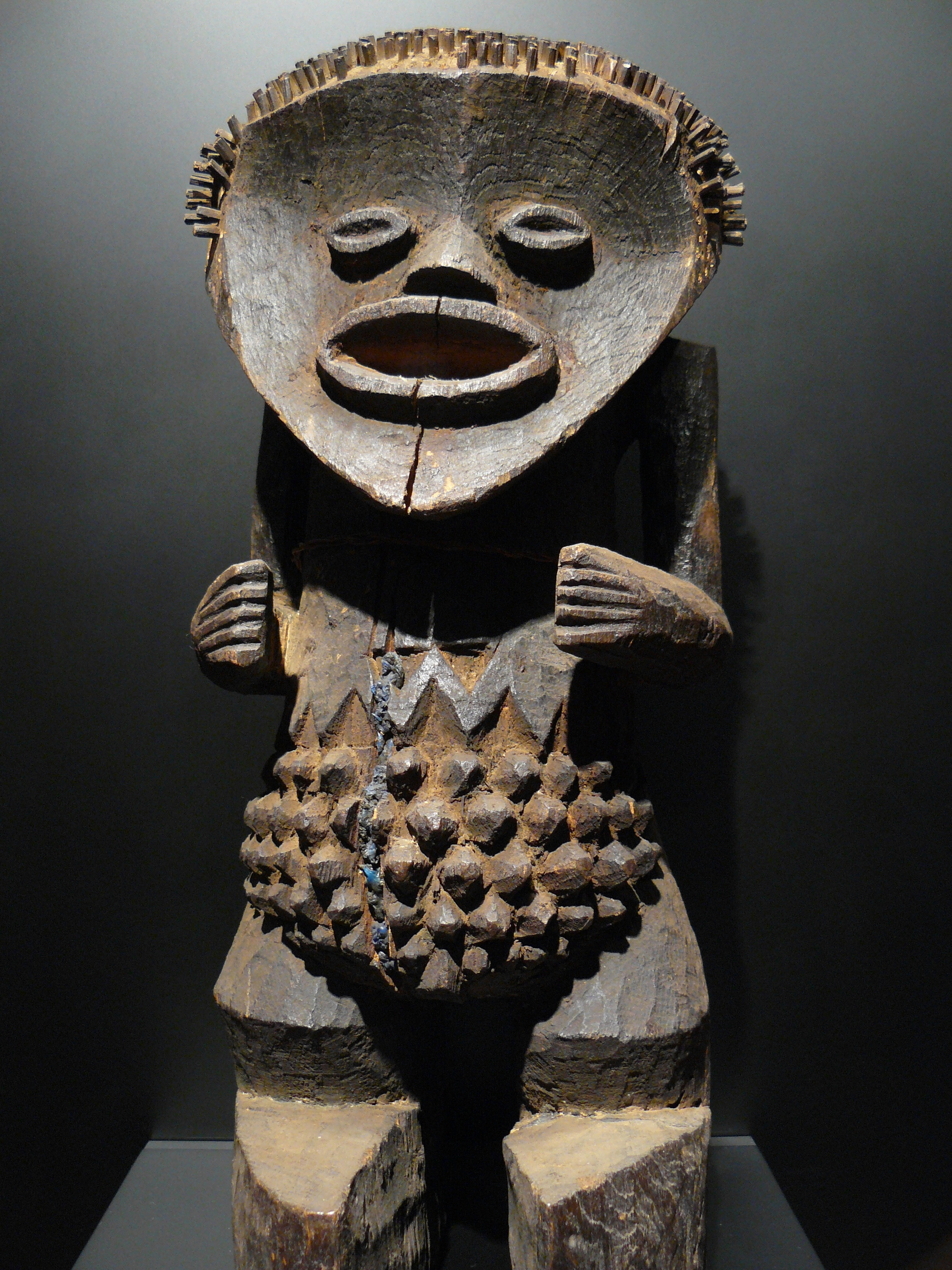
Examples of architecture
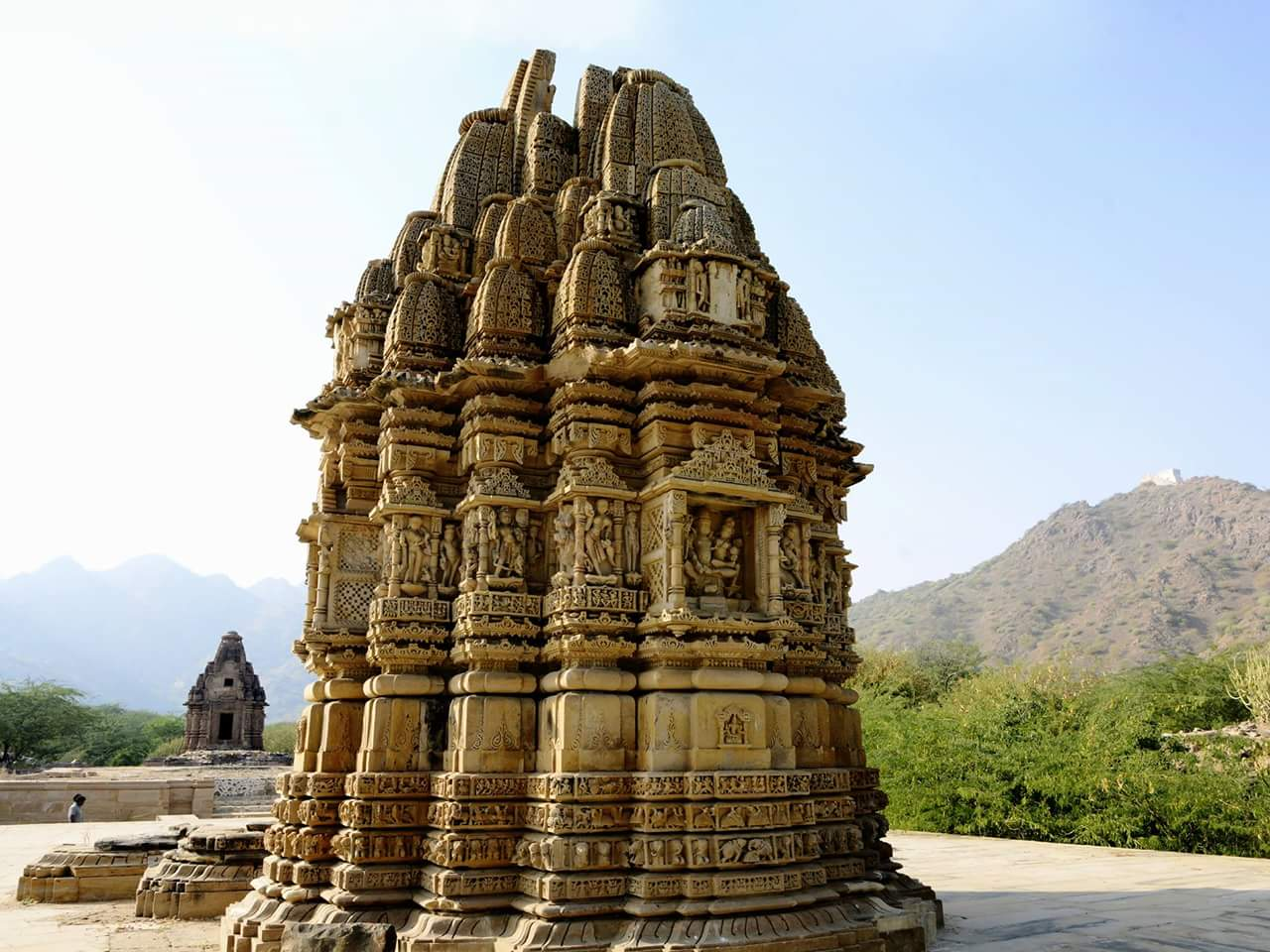
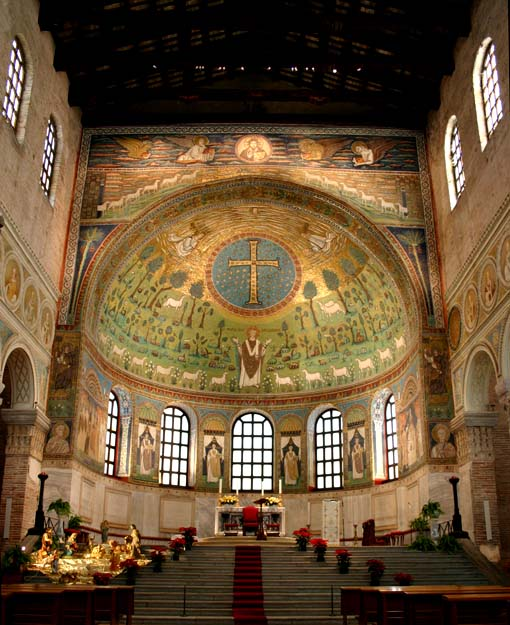
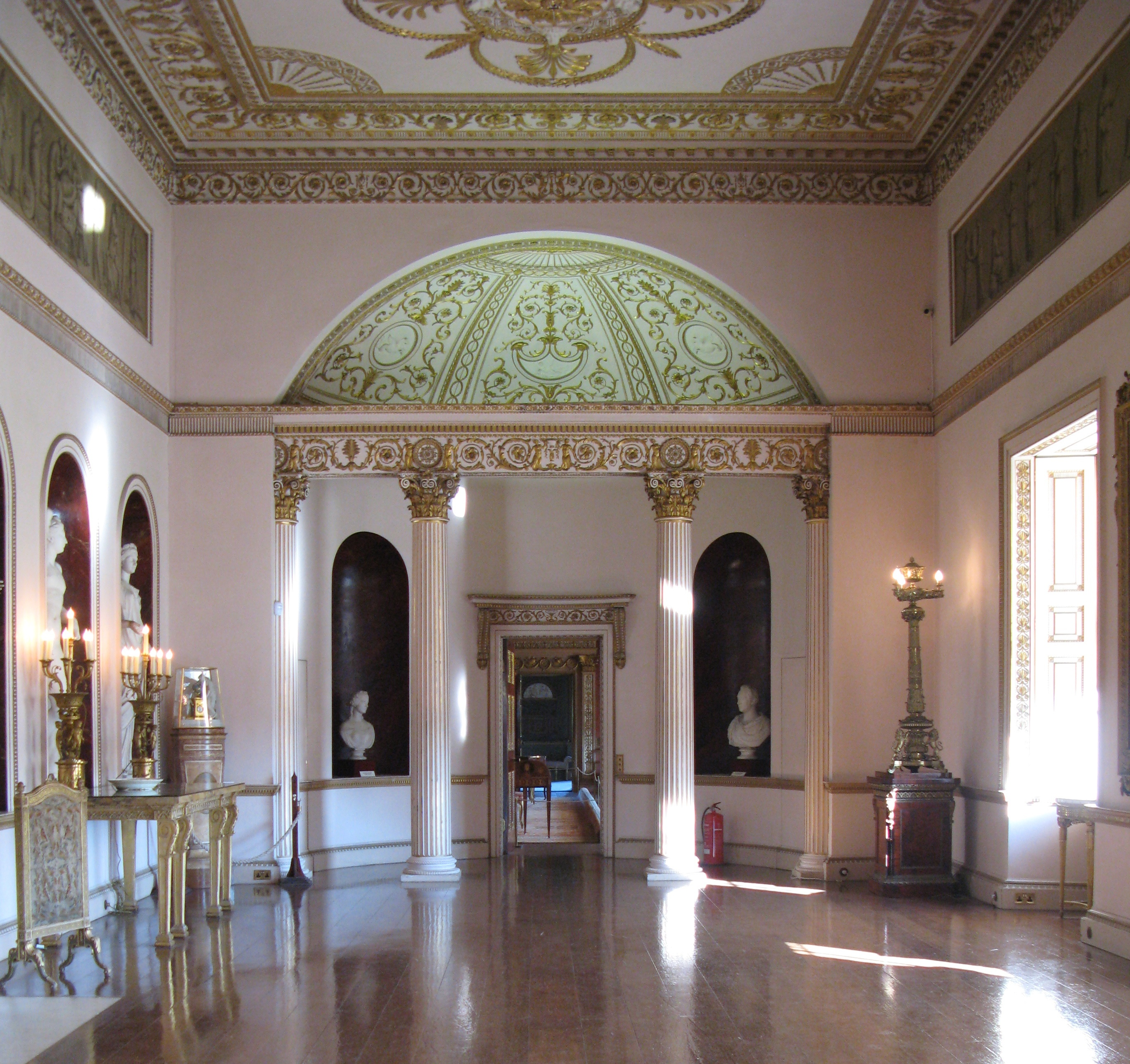
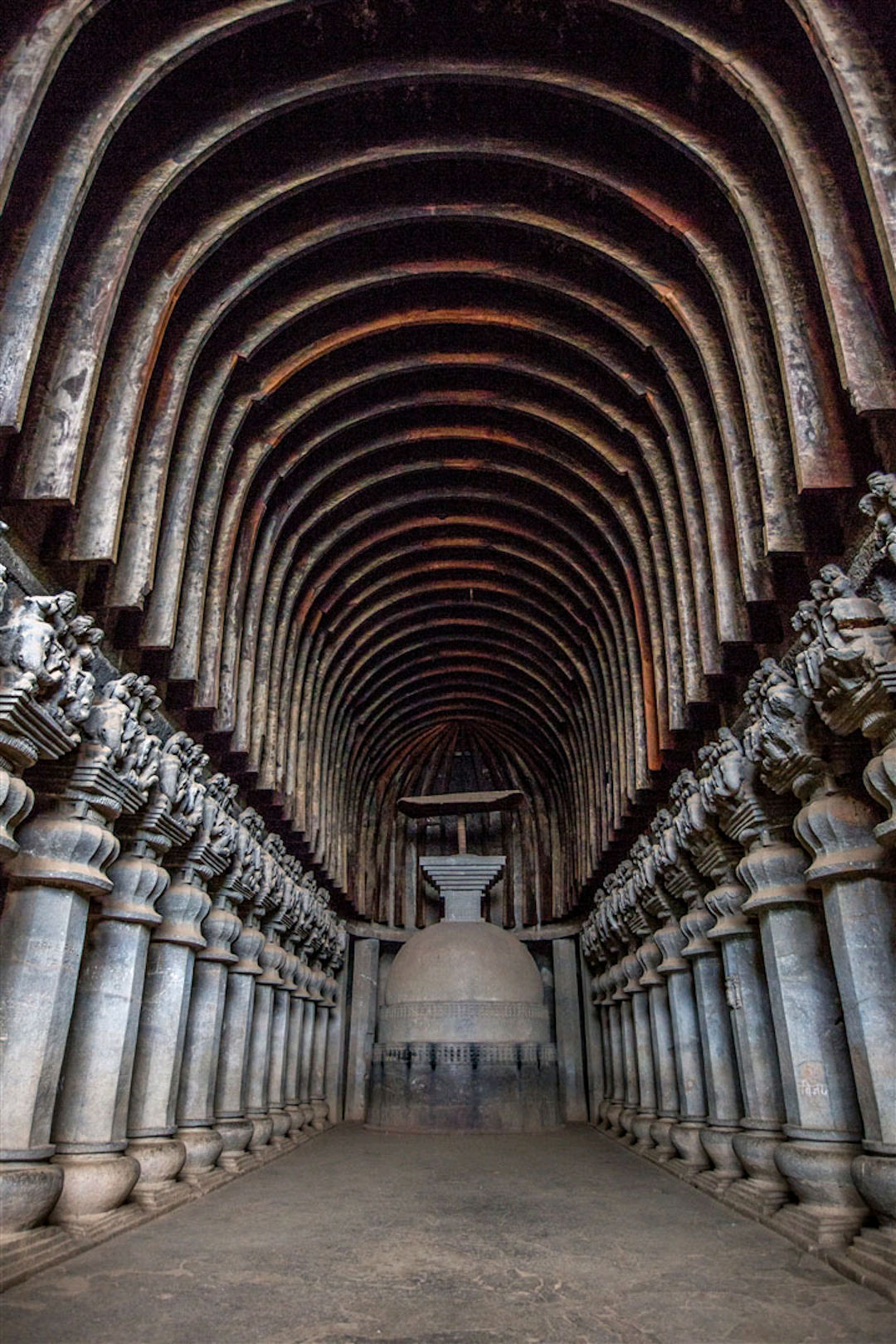
Examples of ceramic art
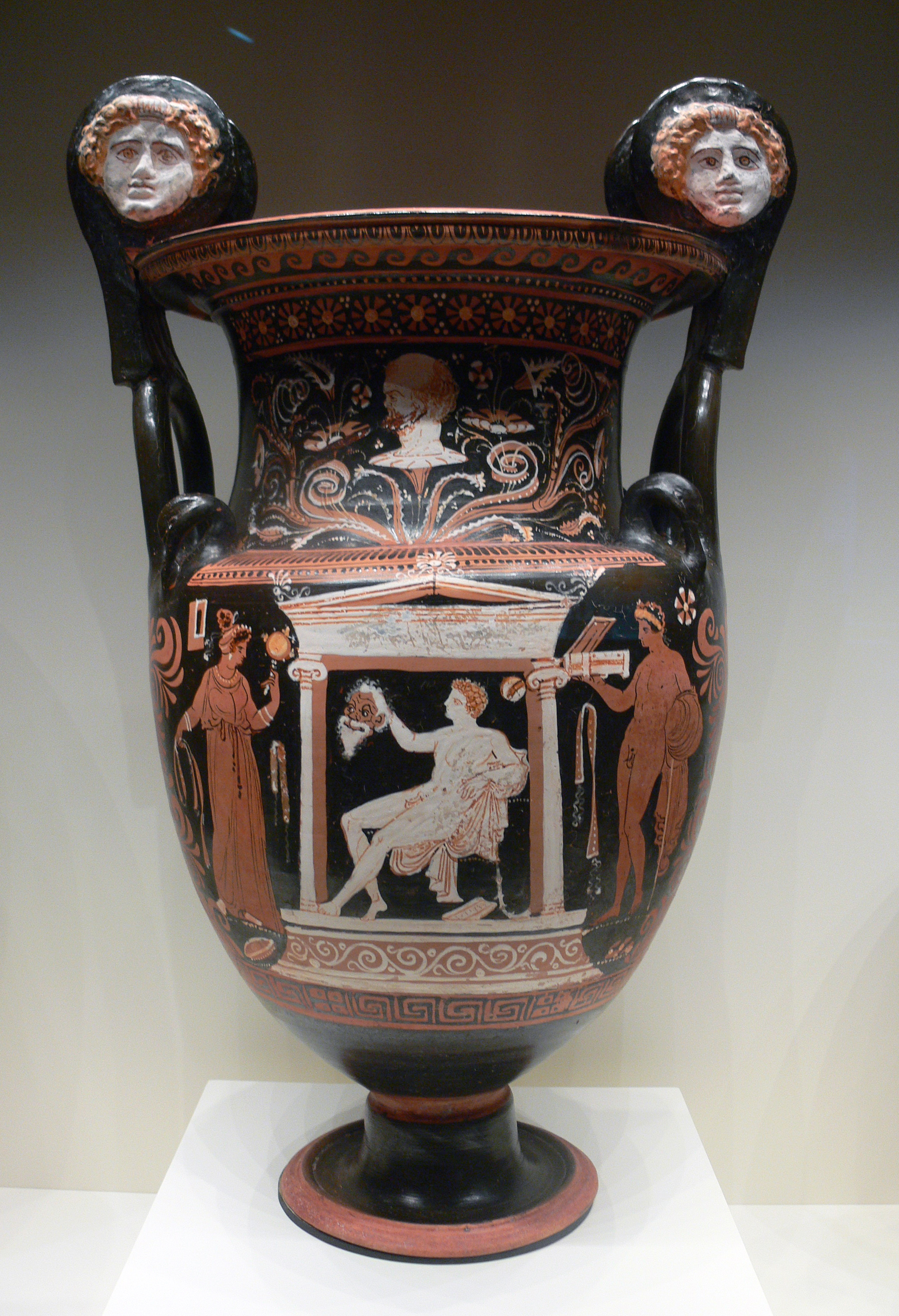
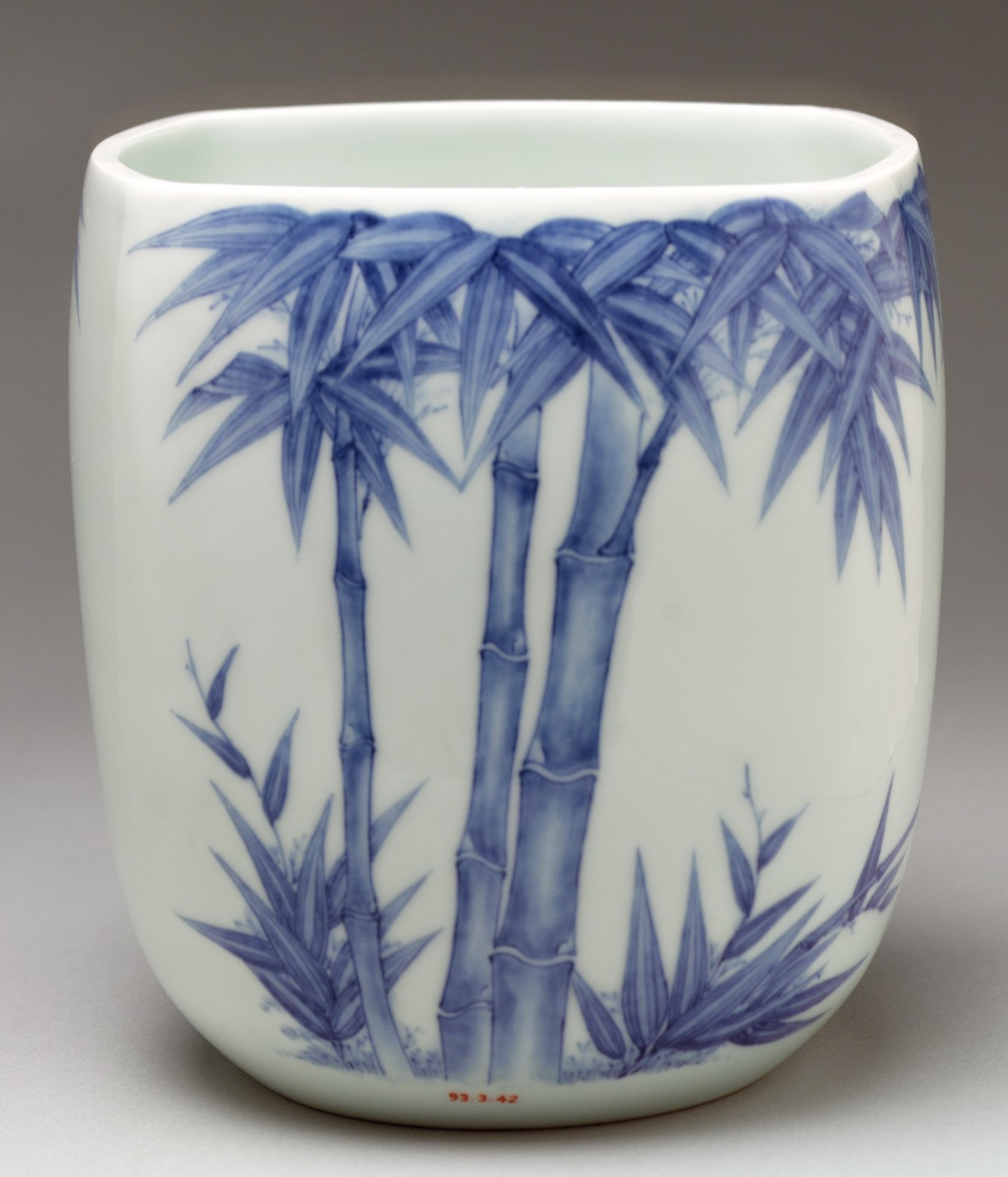
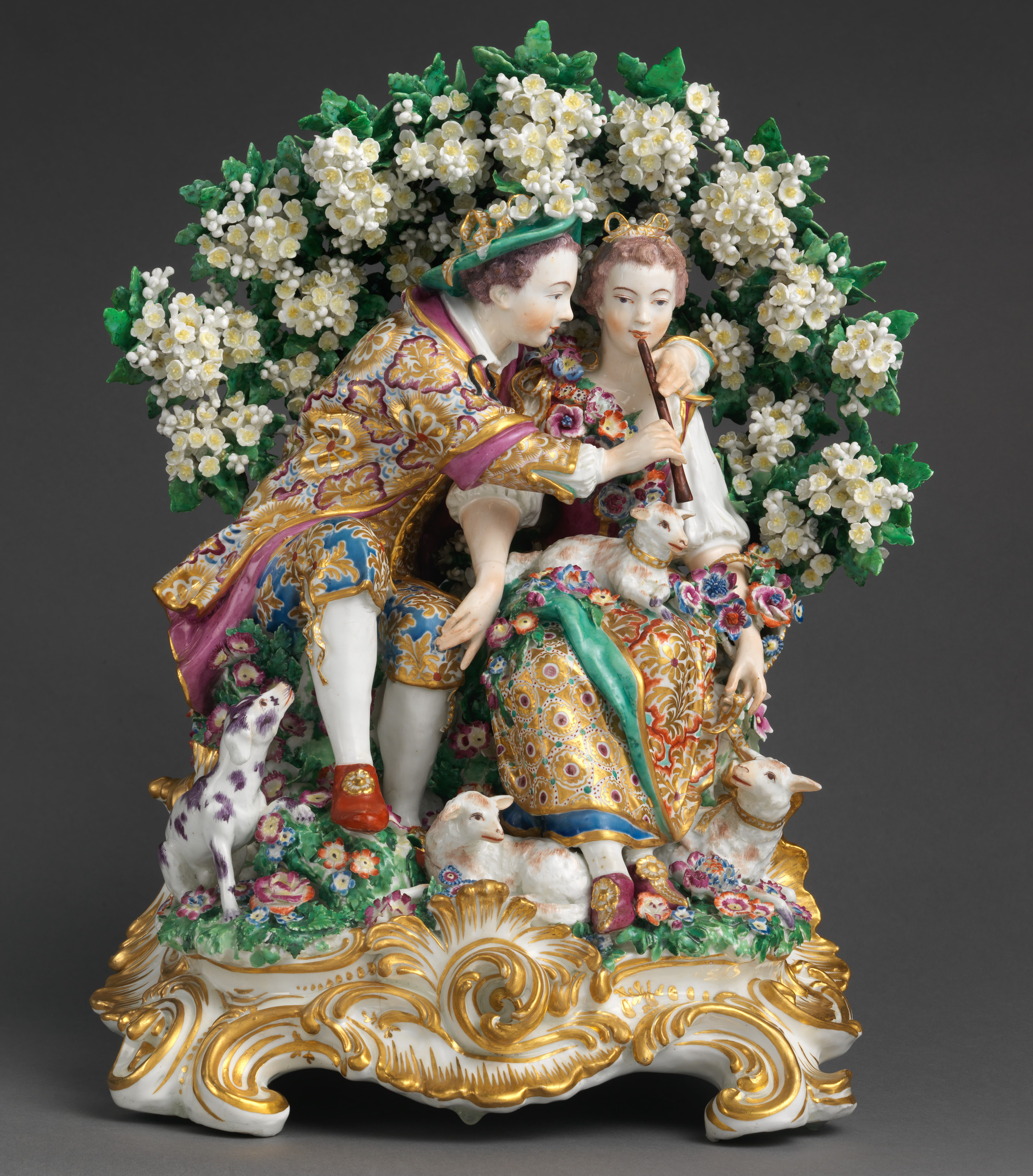
Examples of mosaics
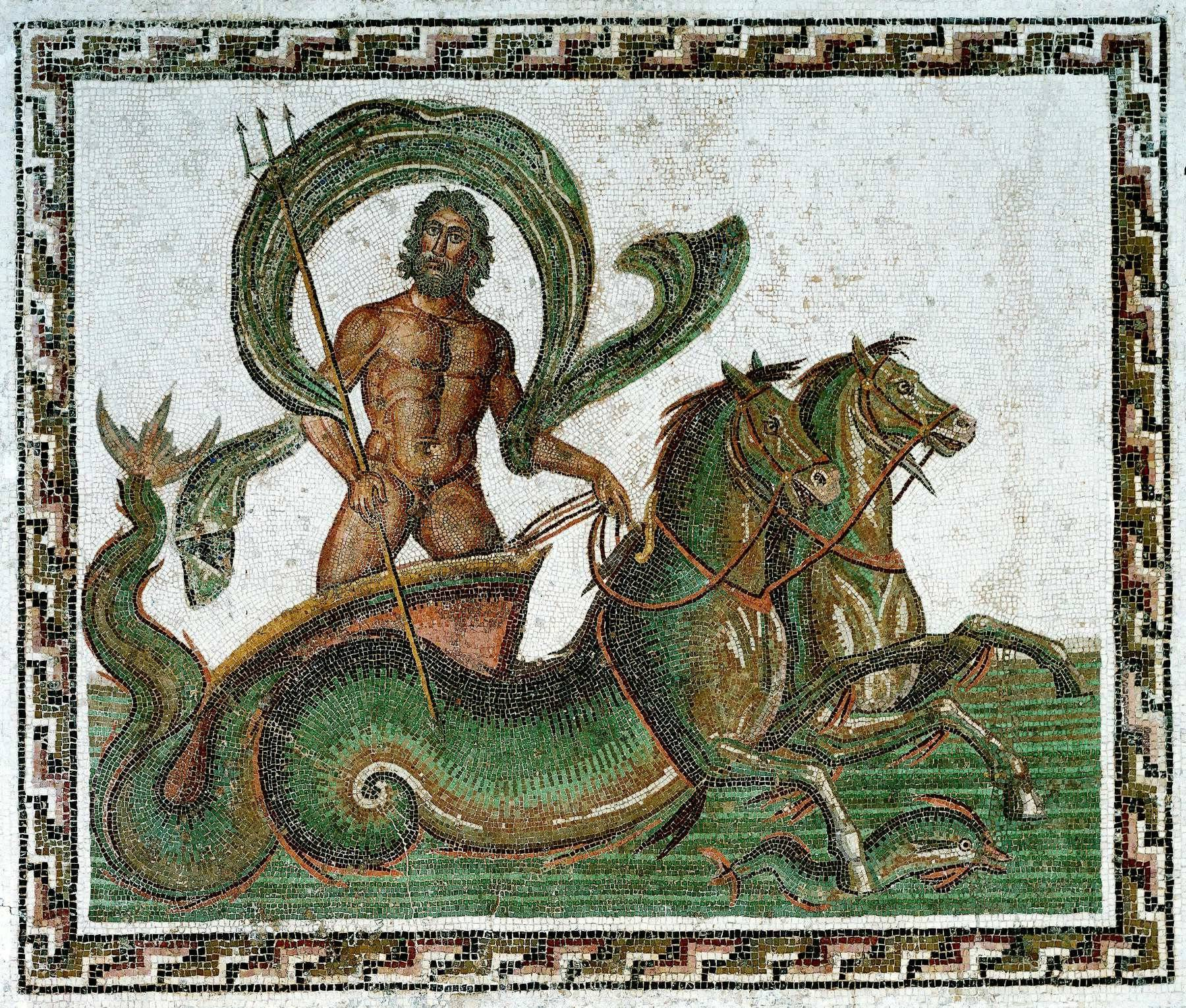
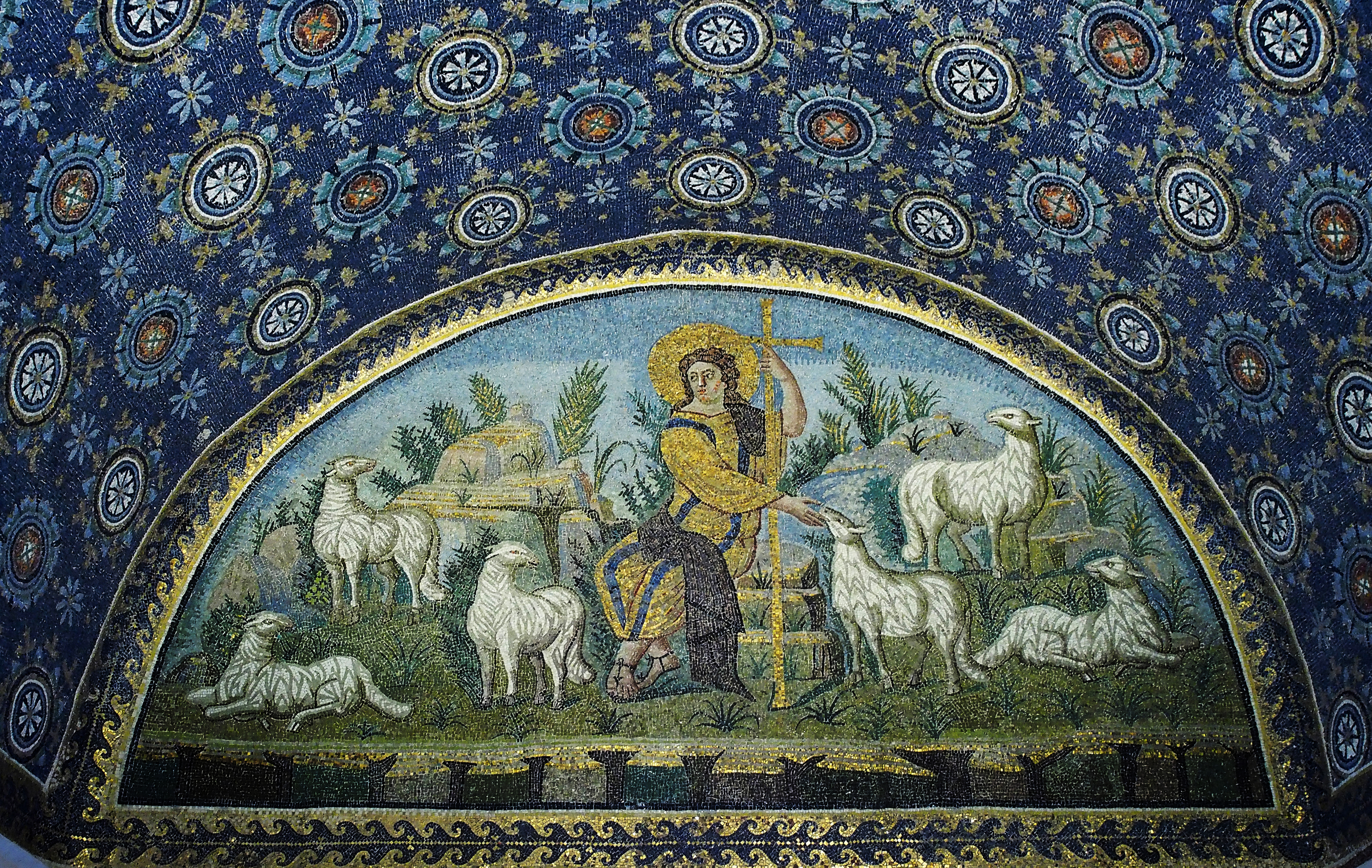
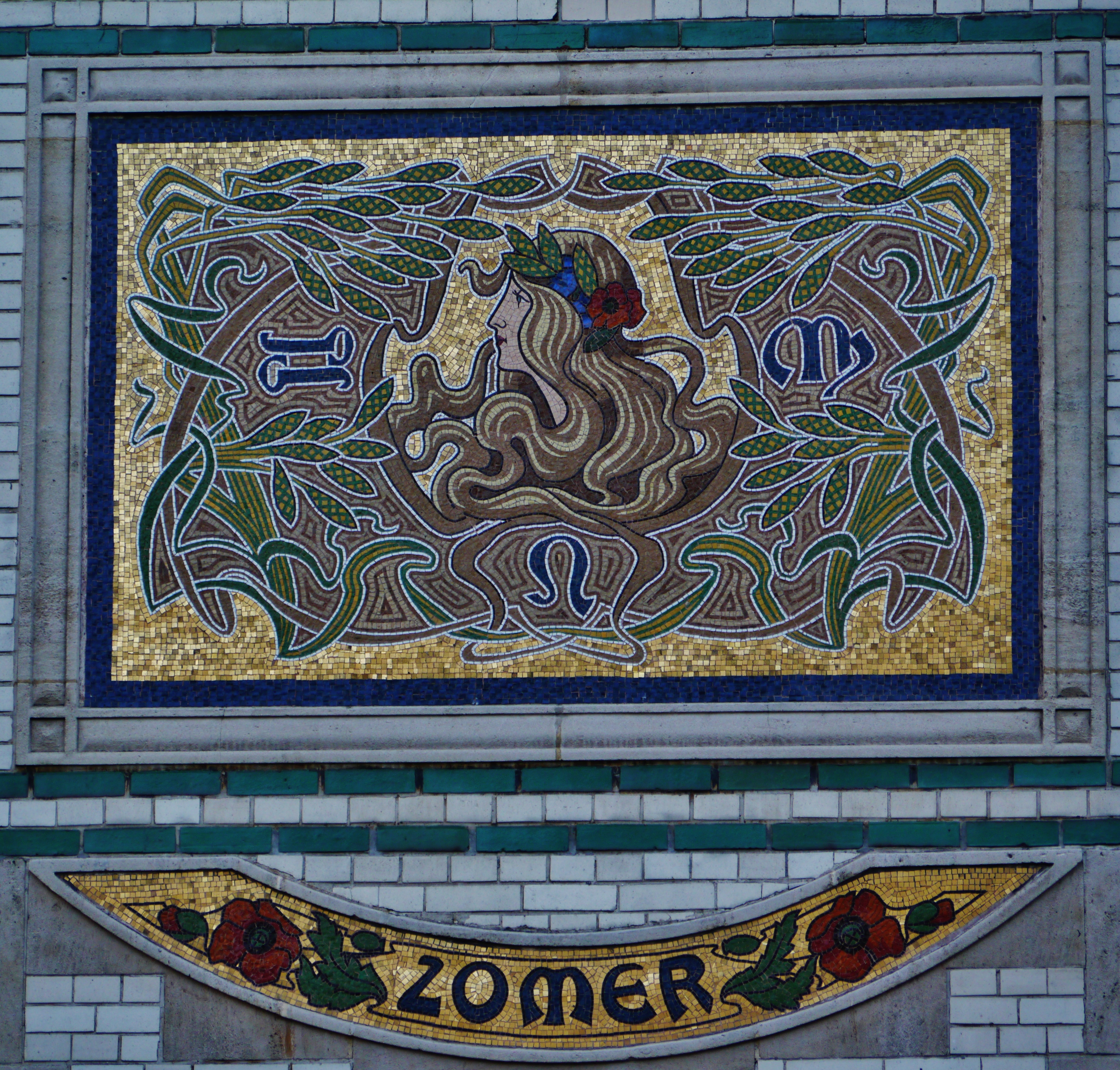
Examples of furniture
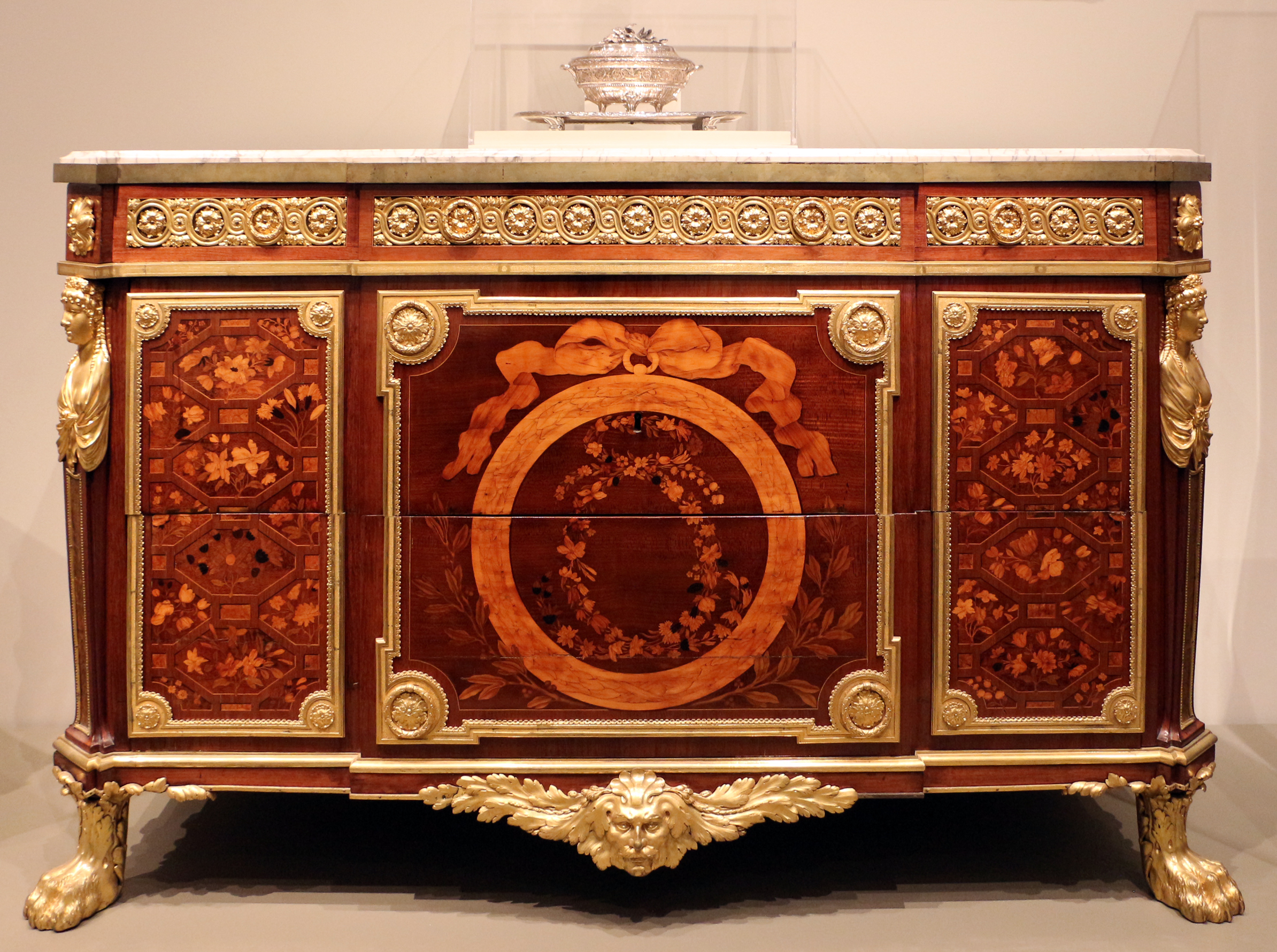
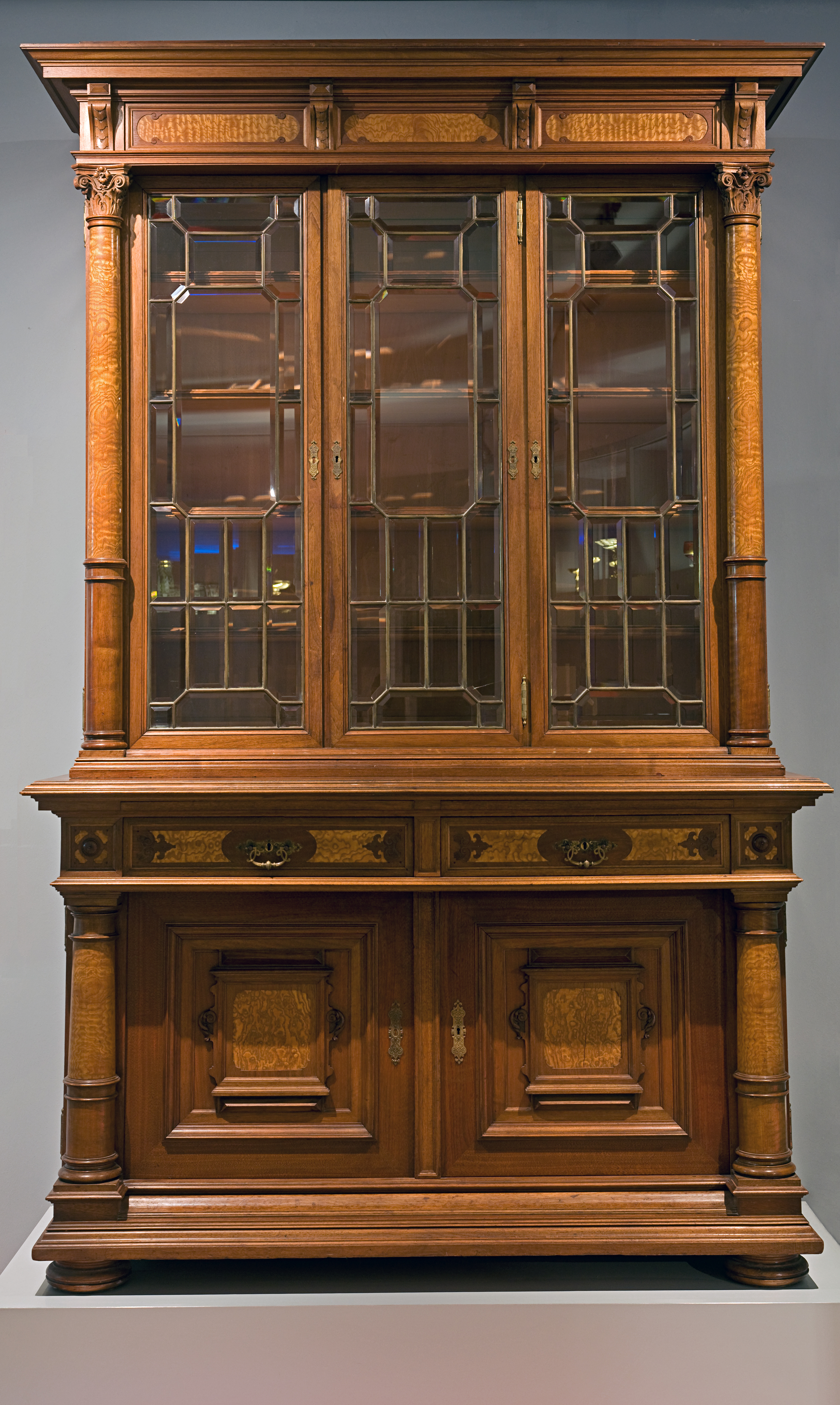
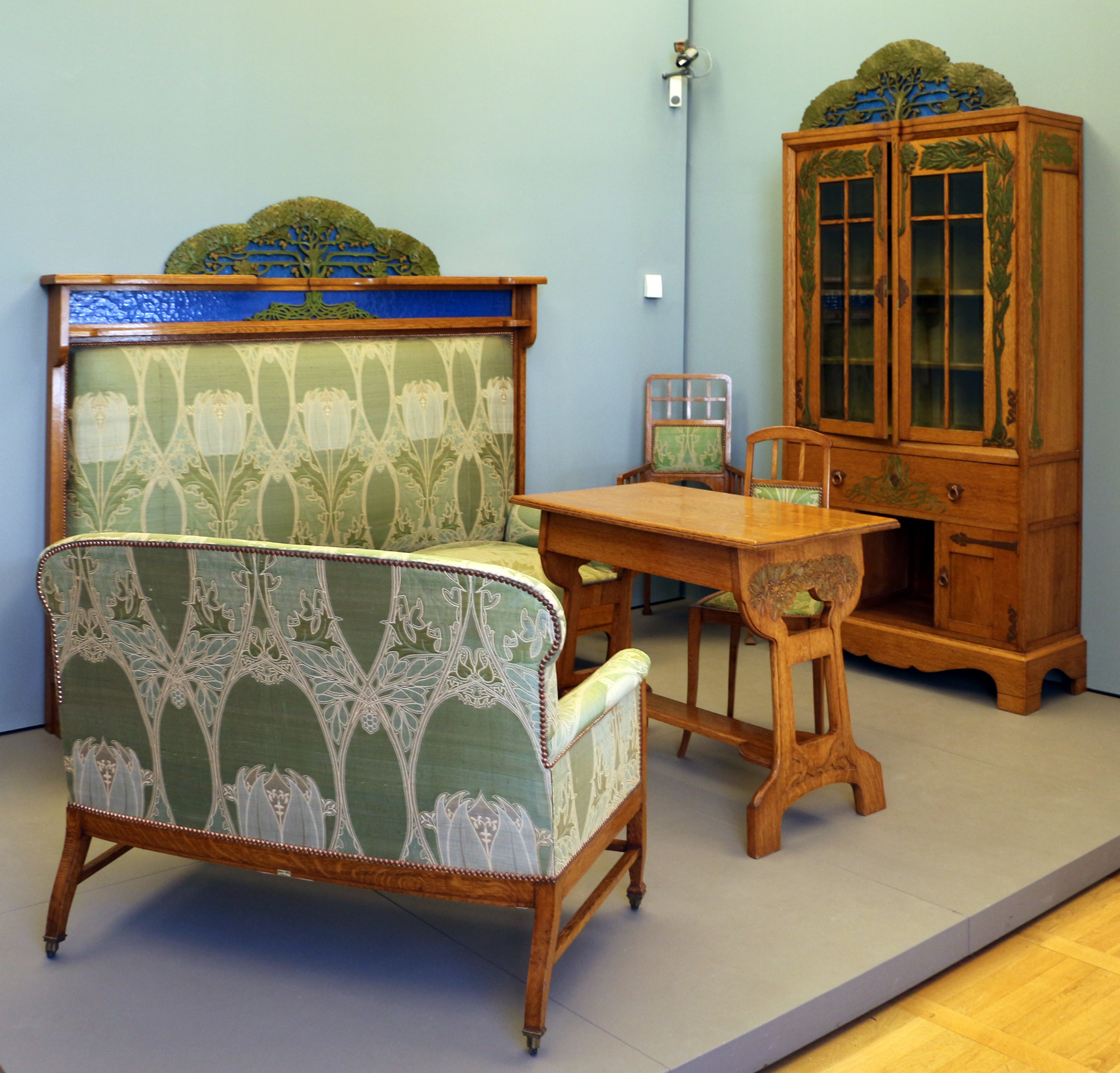
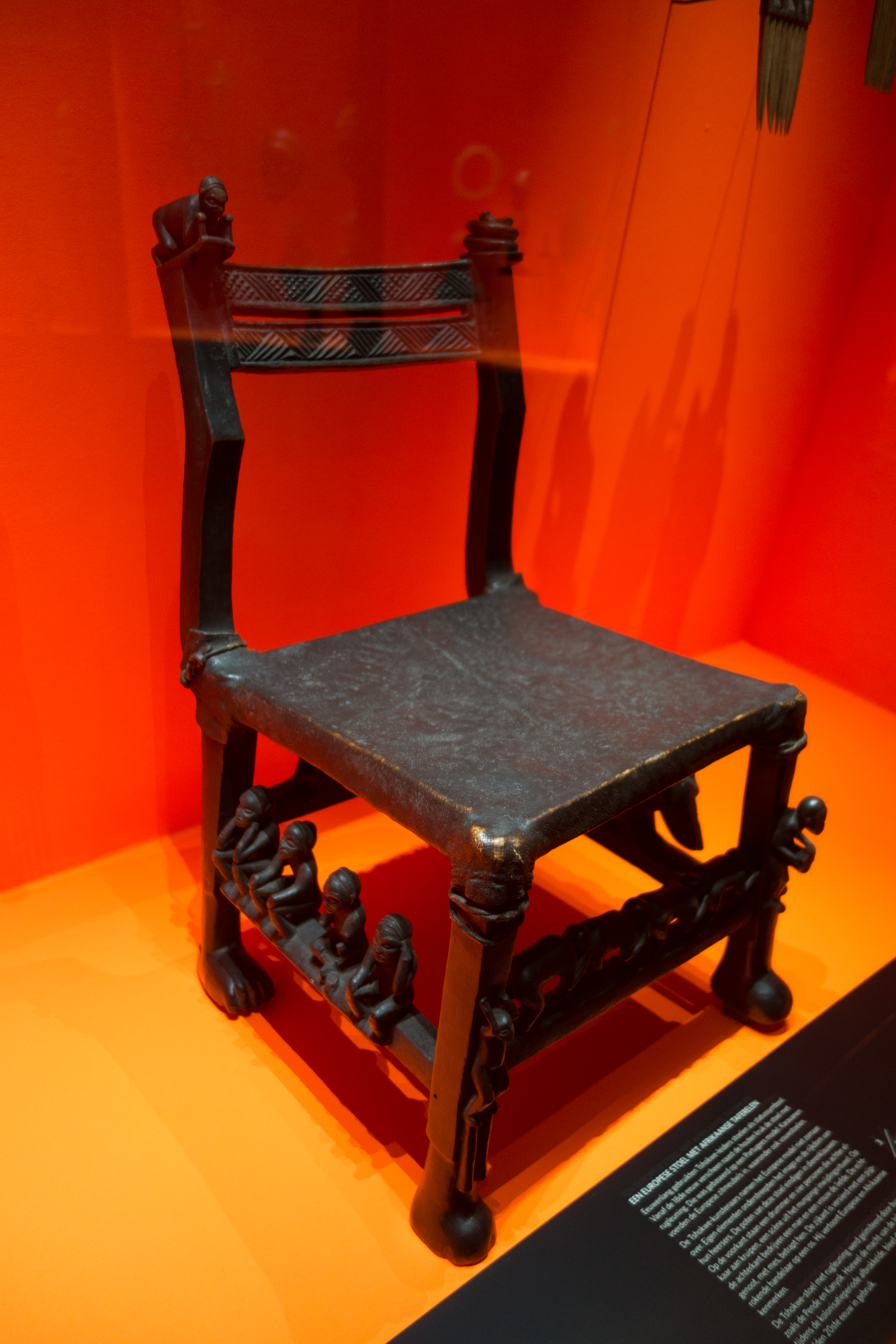

Hm, hm, hm!
Composed by Wolfgang Amadeus Mozart, An example of music, specifically opera

Shine On, Harvest Moon
Performed by Ada Jones and Billy Murray, another example of music, specifically early-1900s vaudeville

A work of art, artwork, art piece, piece of art or art object is an artistic creation of aesthetic value. Except for "work of art", which may be used of any work regarded as art in its widest sense, including works from literature and music, these terms apply principally to tangible, physical forms of visual art:

- An example of fine art, such as a painting or sculpture.
- Objects in the decorative arts or applied arts that have been designed for aesthetic appeal, as well as any functional purpose, such as a piece of jewellery, many ceramics and much folk art.
- An object created for principally or entirely functional, religious or other non-aesthetic reasons which has come to be appreciated as art (often later, or by cultural outsiders).
- A non-ephemeral photograph or film.
- A work of installation art or conceptual art.

Used more broadly, the term is less commonly applied to:

- A fine work of architecture or landscape design
- A production of live performance, such as theater, ballet, opera, performance art, musical concert and other performing arts, and other ephemeral, non-tangible creations.

This article is concerned with the terms and concepts as used in and applied to the visual arts, although other fields such as aural-music and written word-literature have similar issues and philosophies. The term objet d'art is reserved to describe works of art that are not paintings, prints, drawings or large or medium-sized sculptures, or architecture (e.g. household goods, figurines, etc., some purely aesthetic, some also practical). The term oeuvre is used to describe the complete body of work completed by an artist throughout a career.

== Definition ==
A work of art in the visual arts is a physical two- or three- dimensional object that is professionally determined or otherwise considered to fulfill a primarily independent aesthetic function. A singular art object is often seen in the context of a larger art movement or artistic era, such as: a genre, aesthetic convention, culture, or regional-national distinction. It can also be seen as an item within an artist's "body of work" or oeuvre. The term is commonly used by museum and cultural heritage curators, the interested public, the art patron-private art collector community, and art galleries.

Physical objects that document immaterial or conceptual art works, but do not conform to artistic conventions, can be redefined and reclassified as art objects. Some Dada and Neo-Dada conceptual and readymade works have received later inclusion. Also, some architectural renderings and models of unbuilt projects, such as by Vitruvius, Leonardo da Vinci, Frank Lloyd Wright, and Frank Gehry, are other examples.

The products of environmental design, depending on intention and execution, can be "works of art" and include: land art, site-specific art, architecture, gardens, landscape architecture, installation art, rock art, and megalithic monuments.

Legal definitions of "work of art" are used in copyright law; see Visual arts § United States of America copyright definition of visual art.

== Theories ==
Theorists have argued that objects and people do not have a constant meaning, but their meanings are fashioned by humans in the context of their culture, as they have the ability to make things mean or signify something. A prime example of this theory are the Readymades of Marcel Duchamp. Marcel Duchamp criticized the idea that the work of art must be a unique product of an artist's labour or skill through his "readymades": "mass-produced, commercially available, often utilitarian objects" to which he gave titles, designating them as artwork only through these processes of choosing and naming.

Artist Michael Craig-Martin, creator of An Oak Tree, said of his work – "It's not a symbol. I have changed the physical substance of the glass of water into that of an oak tree. I didn't change its appearance. The actual oak tree is physically present, but in the form of a glass of water."

== Distinctions ==
Some art theorists and writers have long made a distinction between the physical qualities of an art object and its identity-status as an artwork. For example, a painting by Rembrandt has a physical existence as an "oil painting on canvas" that is separate from its identity as a masterpiece "work of art" or the artist's magnum opus. Many works of art are initially denied "museum quality" or artistic merit, and later become accepted and valued in museum and private collections. Works by the Impressionists and non-representational abstract artists are examples. Some, such as the readymades of Marcel Duchamp including his infamous urinal Fountain, are later reproduced as museum quality replicas.

Research suggests that presenting an artwork in a museum context can affect the perception of it.

There is an indefinite distinction, for current or historical aesthetic items: between "fine art" objects made by "artists"; and folk art, craft-work, or "applied art" objects made by "first, second, or third-world" designers, artisans and craftspeople. Contemporary and archaeological indigenous art, industrial design items in limited or mass production, and places created by environmental designers and cultural landscapes, are some examples. The term has been consistently available for debate, reconsideration, and redefinition.

== See also ==
- Anti-art
- Artistic media
- Cultural artifact
- Opus number (used in music)
- Outline of aesthetics
- "The Work of Art in the Age of Mechanical Reproduction"
- Western canon
