= The Four Continents =

Painting by Peter Paul Rubens

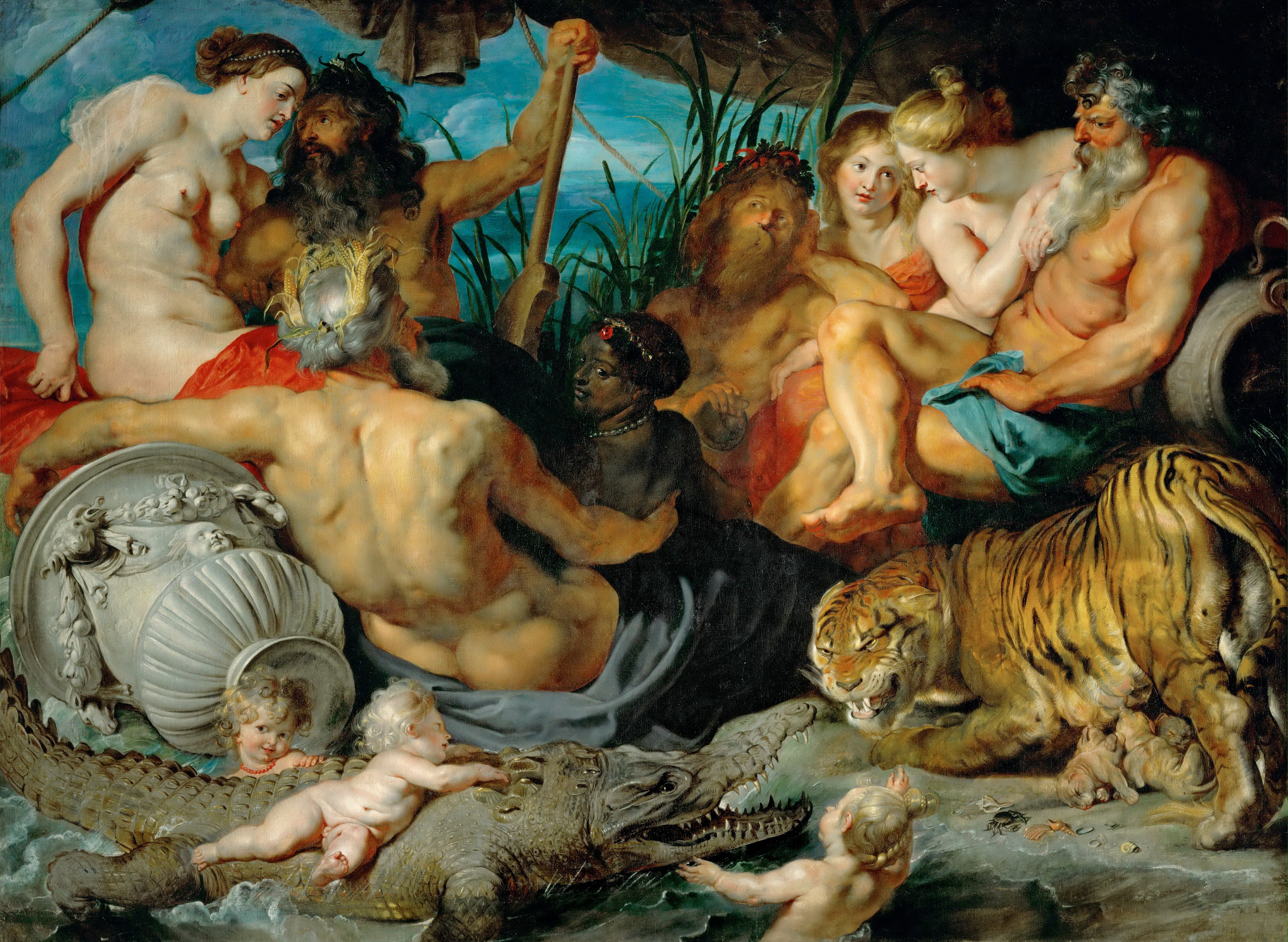
- Artist: Peter Paul Rubens
- Year: 1612–1614 or 1615
- Medium: Oil on canvas
- Dimensions: 209 cm × 284 cm (82 in × 112 in)
- Location: Kunsthistorisches Museum, Vienna

The Four Continents, also known as The Four Rivers of Paradise or The Four Corners of the World, is a painting by Flemish artist Peter Paul Rubens, made between 1612 and 1615. Rubens painted this piece during a time of truce in the Eighty Years' War known as the Twelve Years' Truce. The painting depicts the female personifications of the four continents (Europe, Asia, Africa, and America) with the male personifications of their respective major rivers (the Danube, the Ganges, the Nile, and the Río de la Plata). The painting also depicts three putti in the foreground along with a crocodile, tigress, and her three cubs. An important figure in this piece is the woman in the middle who personifies Africa. She was one of the two black women Rubens painted at the time.

There have been two different interpretations on this piece from the scholars Elizabeth McGrath and Jean Michel Massing. Both scholars presented different interpretations for who the figures are personifying. Other ideas have suggested that Rubens was driven by his own religious influences when creating the piece. Since 2015, there has also been some important restoration work done on both the painting and its frame.

== History ==
Painted during a period of truce between the Dutch Republic and Spain, known as the Twelve Years' Truce, the river allegories and their female companions in a lush, bountiful setting reflect the peaceful conditions that Rubens hoped would return to Antwerp after military hostilities.

During the time of the Eighty Years' War, Rubens had many roles, two of which were artist and diplomat. In 1608, Rubens returned to Antwerp after living and working in Spain because his mother was dying. Rubens was in Antwerp until 1621 when the Twelve Years' Truce ended, and he was called to negotiate in France and England on behalf of Archduchess Isabella on behalf of the Spanish Netherlands. Throughout the 1620's, Rubens had his hands in many diplomatic situations, and these helped to elevate his social status. Rubens's diplomatic work caused him to be invested in the theme of peace, which is expressed in this painting.

== Iconography ==
The painting appears to be set in a marsh land. There are mountains in the background and what appears to be a body of water. The figures are seated at the bank of a body of water, with a large overhang above them. It depicts the female personifications of what are believed to be four continents - Europe, Asia, Africa and America - sitting with the male personifications of their respective major rivers – the Danube, the Ganges, the Nile and the Río de la Plata. Europe is shown on the left, Africa in the middle, Asia on the right and America to the left. Australia was not included as Europeans were unaware of its existence at Rubens's time. Europe on the left is seated slightly higher than the other four women, and this could represent how Europe viewed itself at the time in comparison to the other countries. In comparison, Africa is seated the lowest of the four women. She is also the only one in the image to acknowledge the viewer.

The tigress, protecting the cubs from the crocodile, is used as a symbol of Asia. The personification of the Danube holds a rudder. The personification of the Nile is leaning on a classical piece of architecture. The bottom part of the painting shows several putti. They seem to be playing on and around the crocodile, while the crocodile has its attention more focused on the tigress. While it was not uncommon for Frans Snyders to be the one painting the animals in Rubens' paintings, it appears in this phase of his career that Rubens painted the crocodile, tigress, and tiger cubs. Around this time, Rubens was creating numerous sketches of exotic animals such as lions, crocodiles, tigers, and hippopotamuses. These animals can be seen in other paintings Rubens did around this time.

=== The Black Female Nude ===
One of the characteristics of Rubens's paintings is the way he depicted the human form. Rubens had a preference for depicting full-bodied forms representing the strength humanist ideals passed on from Greco-Roman influenced Renaissance. A modern day interpretation, based on critical theory methods, reads feminist and racial meaning in this piece sometimes using Rubens own words in describing his preference for representing particularly women who were, as he put it, "white as snow." This painting is one of two African women Rubens painted in 1615. While a large part of her body is covered, her upper torso is still visible and shows the same endowed form Rubens has given to the other figures. She sits central in the geometry which may indicate the fascination Baroque artists had with Africa and the Nile because of its mysterious almost mystical source.

Scholars in the seventeenth-century were in conversation about the Nile. In Guide to Greece, Pausanias wrote that the Nile was the only river god to be portrayed as black because the Nile traveled through Ethiopia. There were various depictions at the time of the male god being black, such as in a print by Philips Galle, but this did not translate into sculpture. Rubens took influence from sculptures when depicting the white river god, and chose to depict the female personification of Africa as a black woman. The river god is partially concealing the woman and this could allude to the unknown origin of the Nile in Rubens time. The Nile could be trying to "conceal the origins of his source" as the Roman poet, Horace, wrote. By having his arm firmly around her waist and with a majority of her body being covered, Africa could be representing this unknown source of the Nile.

== Interpretation ==
The art historian Elizabeth McGrath proposed a different interpretation of the female figures on the painting, believing them to be water nymphs representing the sources of the rivers instead. McGrath also suggested corresponding river names, the Tigris instead of the Danube and the Euphrates instead of the Río de la Plata, arguing that those names also appear as the rivers of Paradise in Christian exegesis.

The Arts and Culture news outlet from the University of Exeter poses that this painting could represent the spread of Catholicism around the world. Rubens was a devout Catholic and frequently would depict religious subject matter. Since this scene was unlike others in Rubens's body of work, the connection back to the Catholicism spread seems plausible. Another possible explanation is to symbolize trade with other places in the world. Rubens would also simply be showing off his knowledge of other countries existing and what they have to offer.

In The Image of the Black in Western Art, the author Jean Michel Massing proposes two alternative rivers in place of the Danube and Rio de la Plata. Massing associates the male river god directly above the tiger as the Tigris river, and then the male figure to his left as the Euphrates. One of the reasons for this interpretation is because these four rivers; the Tigris, Euphrates, Nile, and Ganges were the four rivers of paradise in chapter two of Genesis. By representing these rivers, it would have portrayed Rubens as well versed, and shown the extent of his classical knowledge. This would have also been an allegory people from many background would have been able to understand, so he would have reached a wider range of patrons.

== Restoration ==
In 2015, the process for restoring the painting began. This process involved taking the painting out of its frame, placing it on a new canvas, cleaning the surface, and re-touching some places on the painting. The hand carved wood frame was also restored during this process. During the restoration process, it was noticed on the right side of the piece that there were additional pieces of canvas. To restorationists, this hinted at the idea of the piece once being smaller than it currently is and the additional canvas was used to help the painting fill out the frame.

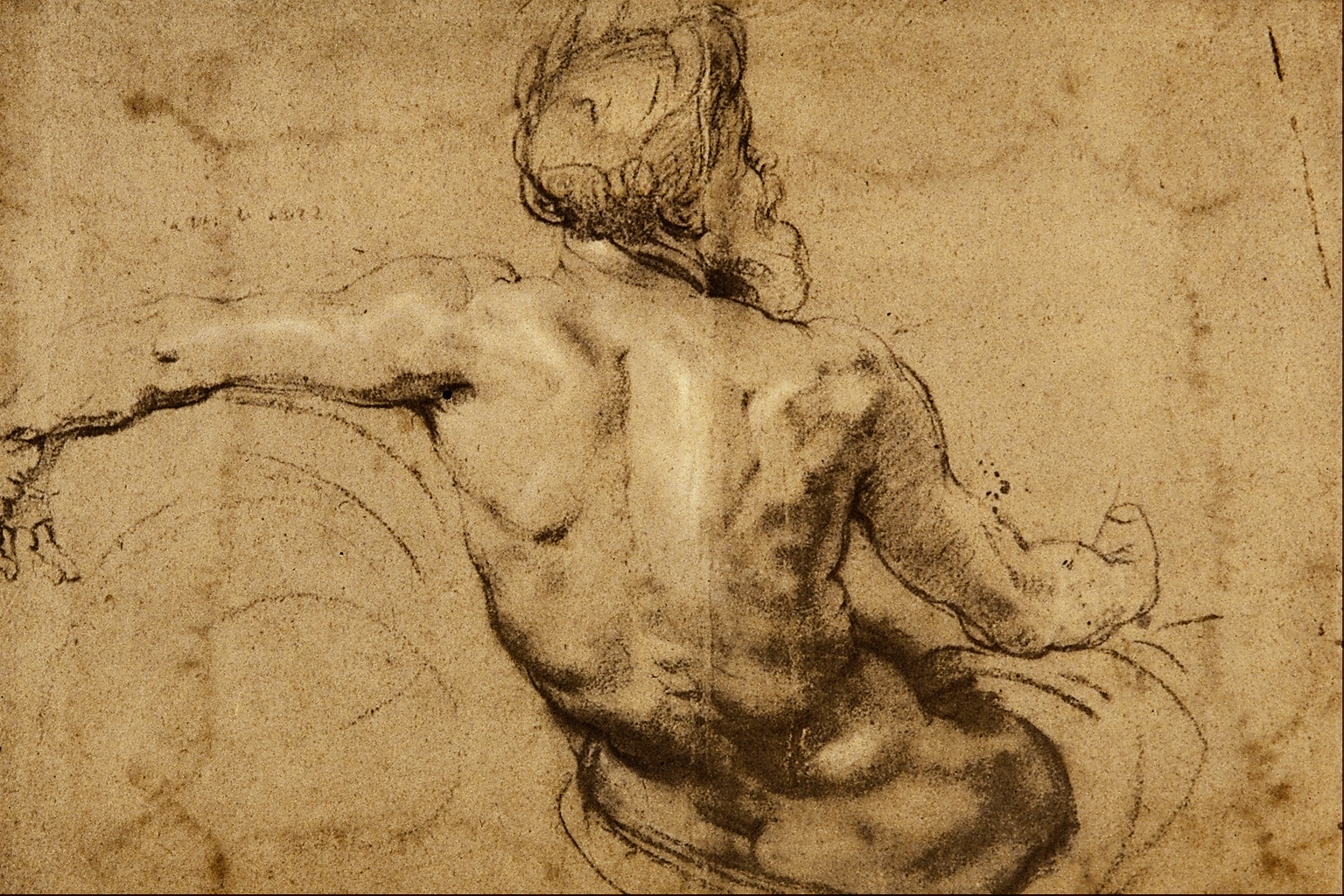
Study of a river personification for the painting
