= Jean Michel Massing =

French art historian

Jean Michel Massing FSA
- Born: 1948 (age 77–78)

Academic background
- Education: University of Strasbourg; Warburg Institute

Academic work
- Discipline: art historian
- Sub-discipline: Classical art; Christian imagery; African art; iconography
- Institutions: Department of History of Art, University of Cambridge; King's College, Cambridge

Jean Michel Massing, FSA (born 1948) is a French art historian and academic. He taught at the Department of History of Art at the University of Cambridge from 1977, rising to become Professor of History of Art in 2004 and twice head of the department. He was also a fellow of King's College, Cambridge from 1982. He retired in 2016.

== Early life ==
Massing was born in 1948, the son of Adrienne and Joseph Massing (1921–1975), a lawyer and mayor of Sarreguemines, Moselle. After receiving a baccalauréat in philosophy in 1967, he continued his studies at University of Strasbourg, where he graduated in Archaeology and History of Art in 1971. He then completed a master's degree with a thesis on the Temptations of St Anthony (1974).

From 1974 to 1977 Massing had a scholarship at the Warburg Institute of London, while a doctoral student under Albert Châtelet. His doctorat ès lettres (1985) was on the iconography of the "Calumny of Apelles", a Renaissance theme recommended by Leon Battista Alberti. It was based on an ekphrasis in the works of Lucian, describing a supposed painting of Apelles (4th century BCE), of which Botticelli's picture is but one example of treatment.

== Career ==
Since 1977, Massing has taught in the Department of History of Art at the University of Cambridge, first as an assistant lecturer from 1977 to 1982, and then as a lecturer from 1982. He was elected a fellow of King's College, Cambridge in 1982. He was appointed a reader in 1997 and made Professor of History of Art in 2004. He was head of the Department of History of Art from 1996 to 1998 and again from 2012 to 2014. He retired in 2016, and was appointed emeritus professor. He was also made a life fellow of King's College, Cambridge.

Massing has been a Syndic of the Fitzwilliam Museum since 1998, a Trustee of the Stained Glass Museum, Ely since 2003 and was a Committee Member of Kettle's Yard from 2012 to 2014.

He was elected Fellow of the Society of Antiquaries of London (FSA) in 1991. He was made Chevalier (1995), then Officer (2005), in the Ordre des Arts et des Lettres. In 2016, a festschrift was published in his honour upon his retirement; it was titled "Tributes to Jean Michel Massing: Towards a Global Art History".

== Works ==
Massing has published widely on topics including Classical art and its influence from antiquity to the Renaissance, astrological imagery, Christian imagery and particular iconographies, for example in the ars memorativa and the emblem. More recently he has worked on African art from the sixteenth to the nineteenth century, on the relationships between European and non-European cultures from the Middle Ages to the nineteenth century, and on Micronesian art, with articles on the history of cartography and the representations of foreign lands and peoples. Now central to his research is the image of people of African origin in western art.

He has been a major contributor to large exhibitions, such as Circa 1492: Art in the Age of Exploration and Encompassing the Globe: Portugal and the World in the 16th and 17th centuries.

=== Books ===
- Du texte à l'image. La Calomnie d'Apelle et son iconographie (1990), published form of doctoral dissertation
- Splendours of Flanders, Late Medieval Art from Cambridge Collections (1993), catalogue with Alain Arnould
- Erasmian Wit and Proverbial Wisdom. An Illustrated Moral Compendium for François 1er (1995)
- Studies in Imagery: Text and Images (2004) and Studies in Imagery: The World Discovered (2007), collected essays
- Triumph, Protection & Dreams: East African Headrests in Context (2011)
- Marfins no Impéro Português/Ivories of the Portuguese Empire (2013) with Gauvin Alexander Bailey and Nuno Vassallo e Silva
- Trans-fer: Iron Sculpture from Africa (2019)
- Kaléidoscope: Dakar & Kinshasa (2020)

==== Co-editor ====
- Etudes offertes à Jean Schaub. Festschrift Jean Schaub (1993) with Jean-Paul Petit (fr:Jean-Paul Petit)
- The Slave in European Art: From Renaissance Trophy to Abolitionist Emblem (2012) with Elizabeth McGrath
- King's College Chapel, 1515-2015: Art, Music and Religion in Cambridge (2014) with Nicolette Zeeman

== Family ==
In 1975, Massing married Ann Houseworth, an American painting restorer and painting conservation historian, who taught at the Hamilton Kerr Institute from 1978 to 2006. She is the daughter of John H. Houseworth of Urbana, Illinois and his wife Barbara Rogers.
