= Elizabeth McGrath (art historian) =

British art historian, curator, and academic

- Born: 20 March 1945 (age 81)
- Citizenship: United Kingdom
- Occupations: Art historian Curator
- Writing career
- Language: English
- Notable awards: Honorary fellow at Warburg Institute; Fellow of the British Academy

Elizabeth McGrath, FBA (born 20 March 1945) is a British art historian, curator, and academic. Spending all of her career at the Warburg Institute of the University of London, she was curator of the photographic collection from 1991 to 2010 and Professor of the History of Art from 2000 to 2010. She additionally held the Slade Professorship of Fine Art at the University of Oxford from 1989 to 1990. Since her retirement in 2010, she has been Emeritus Professor and an honorary fellow of the Warburg Institute.

== Honours ==
In 1998, McGrath was elected a Fellow of the British Academy (FBA), the United Kingdom's national academy for the humanities and social sciences. In 2003, she was elected a Member of the Royal Flemish Academy of Belgium for Science and the Arts.

Her book Rubens: Subjects from History, a volume in the Corpus Rubenianum Ludwig Burchard (London 1997), won the Mitchell Prize in the History of Art for 1998, and was awarded the Eugene Baie prize of the province of Antwerp (for a work on Flemish Cultural History) for the years 1993–98.

== Selected works ==
- McGrath, Elizabeth (1997). Rubens: Subjects from History; Corpus Rubenianum Ludwig Burchard Part XIII. London: Miller. ISBN 978-0905203690.
- McGrath, Elizabeth; Massing, Jean Michel, eds. (2012). The Slave in European Art: from Renaissance Trophy to Abolitionist Emblem. London: Warburg Institute. ISBN 978-1908590435.
- McGrath, Elizabeth, ed. (2016). Rubens: Mythological Subjects: Achilles to the Graces; Corpus Rubenianum Ludwig Burchard Part XI.1. London: Harvey Miller. ISBN 978-1909400467.
